= 2002 United States House of Representatives elections in California =

- November 5, 2002

All 53 California seats to the United States House of Representatives
| | Majority party | Minority party |
|---|---|---|
| Party | Democratic | Republican |
| Last election | 32 | 20 |
| Seats won | 33 | 20 |
| Seat change | ▲1 | Steady |
| Popular vote | 3,731,081 | 3,284,120 |
| Percentage | 51.28% | 45.14% |
| Swing | ▼0.51% | ▲2.54% |

Democratic hold
Republican hold Republican gain
Democratic
40–50%
50–60%
60–70%
70–80%
Republican
40–50%
50–60%
60–70%
70–80%

The United States House of Representatives elections in California, 2002 were elections for California's delegation to the United States House of Representatives, which occurred as part of the general election of the House of Representatives on November 5, 2002. California gained 1 seat because of Congressional apportionment following the 2000 census, which Republicans won. Democrats gained the open 39th district. In the 18th district, Democrat Gary Condit, under fire from the Chandra Levy scandal, lost in the primary to his former chief of staff, Dennis Cardoza.

== Overview ==
United States House of Representatives elections in California, 2002
| Party | Votes | % | Before | After | +/– |
|---|---|---|---|---|---|
| Democratic | 3,731,081 | 51.28% | 32 | 33 | +1 |
| Republican | 3,284,120 | 45.14% | 20 | 20 | 0 |
| Libertarian | 219,118 | 3.01% | 0 | 0 | 0 |
| Green | 20,674 | 0.28% | 0 | 0 | 0 |
| American Independent | 9,325 | 0.13% | 0 | 0 | 0 |
| Natural Law | 4,860 | 0.07% | 0 | 0 | 0 |
| Reform | 4,726 | 0.06% | 0 | 0 | 0 |
| Write-ins | 2,002 | 0.03% | 0 | 0 | 0 |
| Invalid or blank votes | 484,381 | 6.20% | — | — | — |
| Totals | 7,760,287 | 100.00% | 52 | 53 | +1 |

== Results ==
Final results from the Secretary of State of California:

== District 1 ==
2002 California's 1st congressional district election
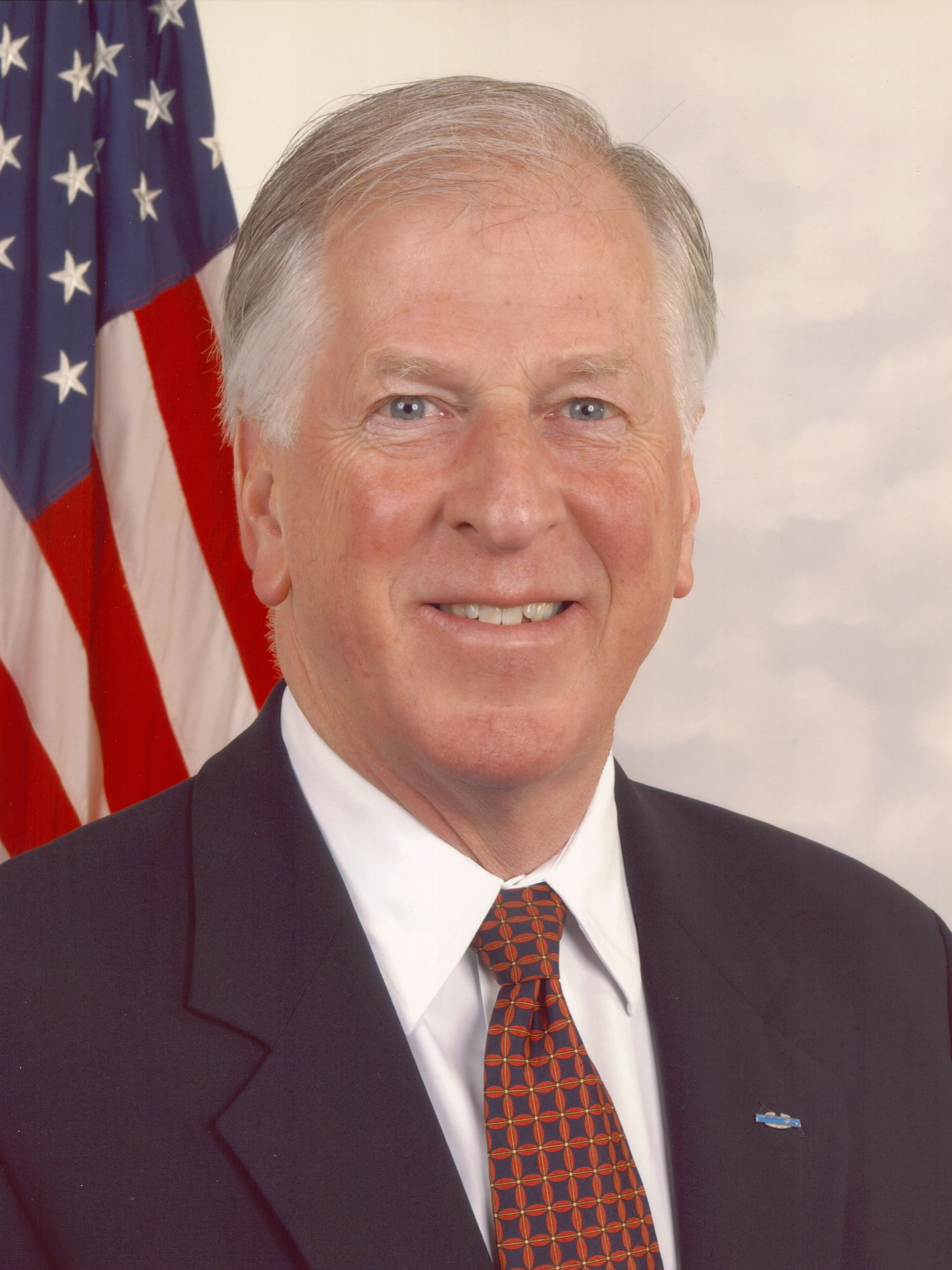

| Nominee | Mike Thompson | Lawrence R. Wiesner |
| Party | Democratic | Republican |
| Popular vote | 118,669 | 60,013 |
| Percentage | 64.1% | 32.4% |
- County results Thompson: 50–60% 60–70%
U.S. Representative before election
Mike Thompson
Democratic
Elected U.S. Representative
Mike Thompson
Democratic

=== Predictions ===
| Source | Ranking | As of |
|---|---|---|
| Sabato's Crystal Ball | Safe D | November 4, 2002 |
| New York Times | Safe D | October 14, 2002 |

=== Results ===
California's 1st congressional district election, 2002
| Party | Candidate | Votes | % |
|---|---|---|---|
| Democratic | Mike Thompson (incumbent) | 118,669 | 64.07 |
| Republican | Lawrence R. Wiesner | 60,013 | 32.40 |
| Libertarian | Kevin Bastian | 6,534 | 3.53 |
| Invalid or blank votes | | 7,178 | 3.73 |
| Total votes | | 192,236 | 100.00 |
| Turnout | | | |
| Democratic hold | | | |

== District 2 ==
2002 California's 2nd congressional district election
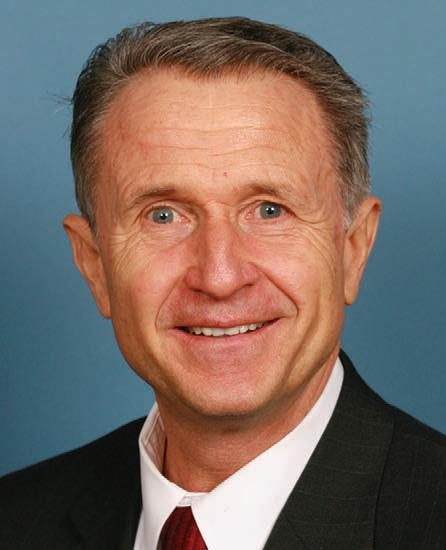

| Nominee | Wally Herger | Mike Johnson | Joshua Brown |
| Party | Republican | Democratic | Peace and Freedom |
| Popular vote | 117,747 | 52,455 | 16,281 |
| Percentage | 65.8% | 29.3% | 8.9% |
- County results Herger: 50–60% 60–70% 70–80%
U.S. Representative before election
Wally Herger
Republican
Elected U.S. Representative
Wally Herger
Republican

=== Predictions ===
| Source | Ranking | As of |
|---|---|---|
| Sabato's Crystal Ball | Safe R | November 4, 2002 |
| New York Times | Safe R | October 14, 2002 |

=== Results ===
California's 2nd congressional district election, 2002
| Party | Candidate | Votes | % |
|---|---|---|---|
| Republican | Wally Herger (incumbent) | 117,747 | 65.79 |
| Democratic | Mike Johnson | 52,455 | 29.31 |
| Peace and Freedom | Joshua Brown | 16,281 | 8.93 |
| Total votes | | 186,483 | 100.00 |
| Turnout | | | |
| Republican hold | | | |

== District 3 ==
2002 California's 3rd congressional district election
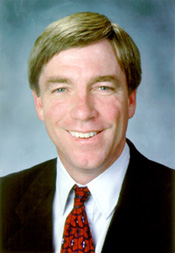

| Nominee | Doug Ose | Howard Beeman |
| Party | Republican | Democratic |
| Popular vote | 121,732 | 67,136 |
| Percentage | 62.5% | 34.4% |
- County results Ose: 40–50% 50–60% 60–70%
U.S. Representative before election
Doug Ose
Republican
Elected U.S. Representative
Doug Ose
Republican

=== Predictions ===
| Source | Ranking | As of |
|---|---|---|
| Sabato's Crystal Ball | Safe R | November 4, 2002 |
| New York Times | Safe R | October 14, 2002 |

=== Results ===
California's 3rd congressional district election, 2002
| Party | Candidate | Votes | % |
|---|---|---|---|
| Republican | Doug Ose (incumbent) | 121,732 | 62.45 |
| Democratic | Howard Beeman | 67,136 | 34.44 |
| Libertarian | Douglas Arthur Tuma | 6,050 | 3.10 |
| Invalid or blank votes | | 2,052 | 1.04 |
| Total votes | | 196,970 | 100.00 |
| Turnout | | | |
| Republican hold | | | |

== District 4 ==
2002 California's 4th congressional district election
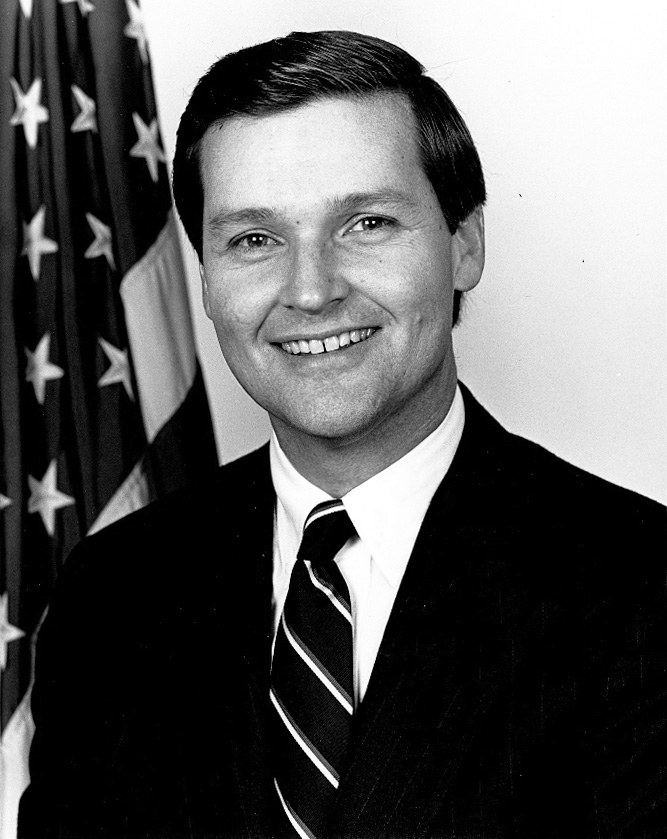

| Nominee | John Doolittle | Mark A. Norberg |
| Party | Republican | Democratic |
| Popular vote | 147,997 | 72,860 |
| Percentage | 64.8% | 31.9% |
- County results Doolittle: 50–60% 60–70% 70–80%
U.S. Representative before election
John Doolittle
Republican
Elected U.S. Representative
John Doolittle
Republican

=== Predictions ===
| Source | Ranking | As of |
|---|---|---|
| Sabato's Crystal Ball | Safe R | November 4, 2002 |
| New York Times | Safe R | October 14, 2002 |

=== Results ===
California's 4th congressional district election, 2002
| Party | Candidate | Votes | % |
|---|---|---|---|
| Republican | John Doolittle (incumbent) | 147,997 | 64.77 |
| Democratic | Mark A. Norberg | 72,860 | 31.89 |
| Libertarian | Allen M. Roberts | 7,247 | 3.17 |
| No party | Bill Kirby (write-in) | 401 | 0.18 |
| No party | Phillip James Parisius (write-in) | 1 | 0.00 |
| Invalid or blank votes | | 7,518 | 3.19 |
| Total votes | | 236,024 | 100.00 |
| Turnout | | | |
| Republican hold | | | |

== District 5 ==
2002 California's 5th congressional district election
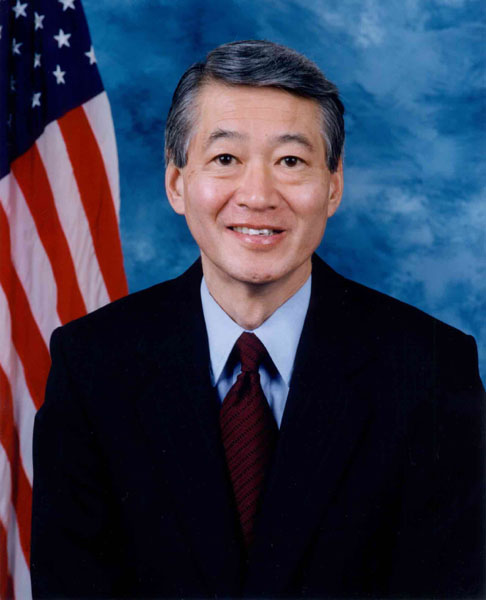

| Nominee | Robert Matsui | Richard Frankhuizen |
| Party | Democratic | Republican |
| Popular vote | 92,726 | 34,749 |
| Percentage | 70.5% | 26.4% |
- County results Matsui: 70–80%
U.S. Representative before election
Robert Matsui
Democratic
Elected U.S. Representative
Robert Matsui
Democratic

=== Predictions ===
| Source | Ranking | As of |
|---|---|---|
| Sabato's Crystal Ball | Safe D | November 4, 2002 |
| New York Times | Safe D | October 14, 2002 |

=== Results ===
California's 5th congressional district election, 2002
| Party | Candidate | Votes | % |
|---|---|---|---|
| Democratic | Robert Matsui (incumbent) | 92,726 | 70.47 |
| Republican | Richard Frankhuizen | 34,749 | 26.41 |
| Libertarian | Timothy E. Roloff | 4,103 | 3.12 |
| Invalid or blank votes | | 0 | 0.00 |
| Total votes | | 131,578 | 100.00 |
| Turnout | | | |
| Democratic hold | | | |

== District 6 ==
2002 California's 6th congressional district election
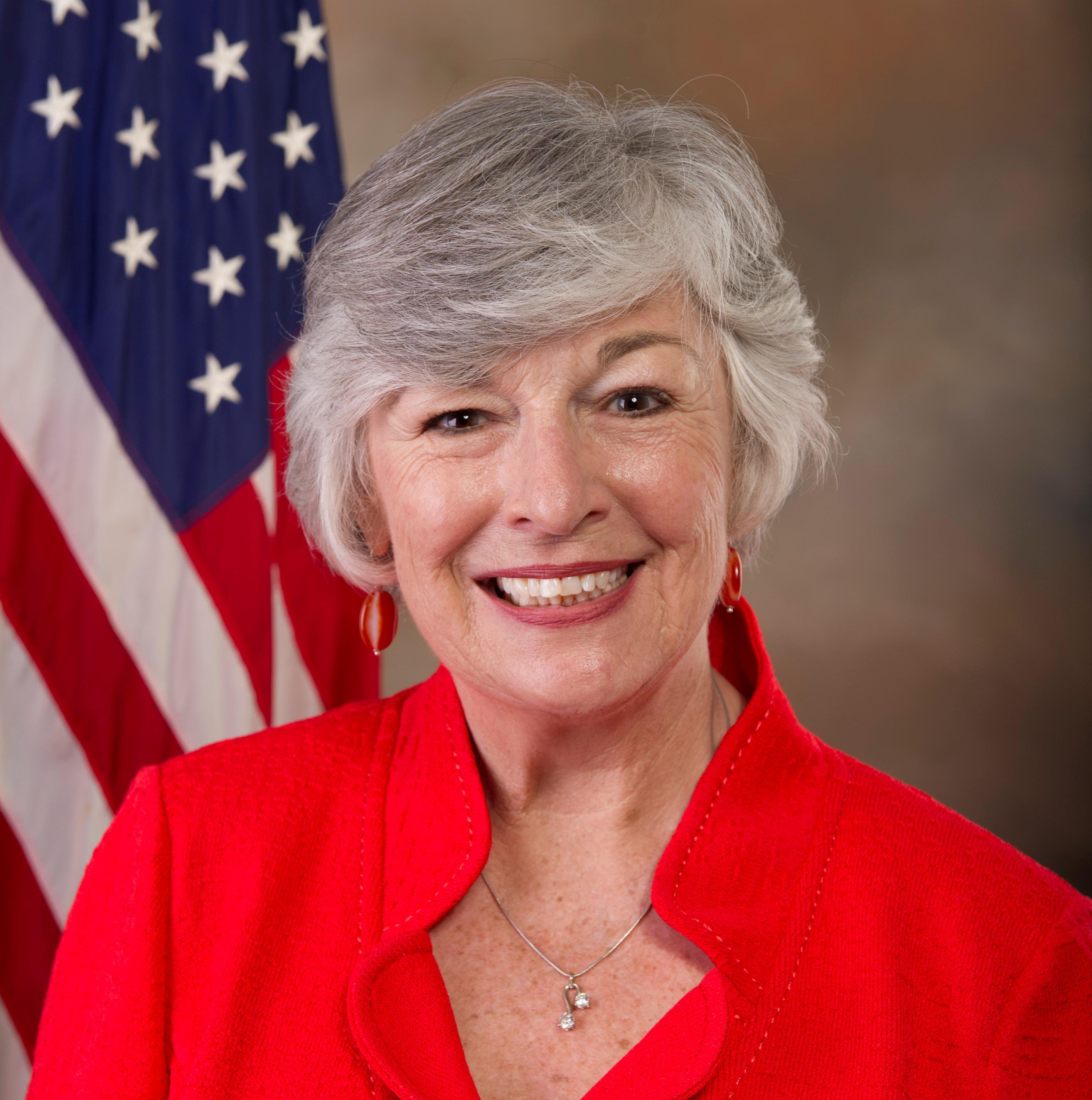

| Nominee | Lynn Woolsey | Paul L. Erickson |
| Party | Democratic | Republican |
| Popular vote | 139,750 | 62,052 |
| Percentage | 66.7% | 29.6% |
- County results Woolsey: 60–70%
U.S. Representative before election
Lynn Woolsey
Democratic
Elected U.S. Representative
Lynn Woolsey
Democratic

=== Predictions ===
| Source | Ranking | As of |
|---|---|---|
| Sabato's Crystal Ball | Safe D | November 4, 2002 |
| New York Times | Safe D | October 14, 2002 |

=== Results ===
California's 6th congressional district election, 2002
| Party | Candidate | Votes | % |
|---|---|---|---|
| Democratic | Lynn Woolsey (incumbent) | 139,750 | 66.69 |
| Republican | Paul L. Erickson | 62,052 | 29.61 |
| Libertarian | Richard O. Barton | 4,936 | 2.36 |
| Reform | Jeff Rainforth | 2,825 | 1.35 |
| Invalid or blank votes | | 7,890 | 3.63 |
| Total votes | | 217,453 | 100.00 |
| Turnout | | | |
| Democratic hold | | | |

== District 7 ==
2002 California's 7th congressional district election
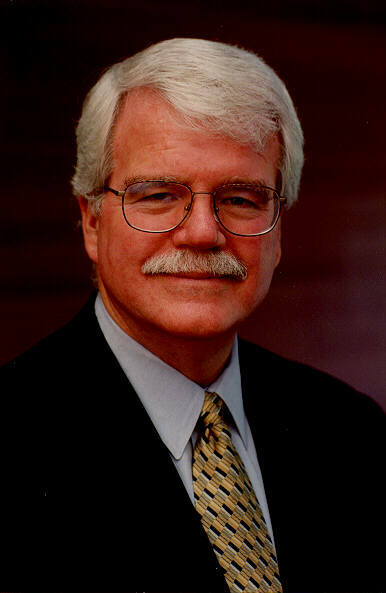

| Nominee | George Miller | Charles R. Hargrave |
| Party | Democratic | Republican |
| Popular vote | 97,849 | 36,584 |
| Percentage | 70.7% | 26.4% |
- County results Miller: 60–70% 70–80%
U.S. Representative before election
George Miller
Democratic
Elected U.S. Representative
George Miller
Democratic

=== Predictions ===
| Source | Ranking | As of |
|---|---|---|
| Sabato's Crystal Ball | Safe D | November 4, 2002 |
| New York Times | Safe D | October 14, 2002 |

=== Results ===
California's 7th congressional district election, 2002
| Party | Candidate | Votes | % |
|---|---|---|---|
| Democratic | George Miller (incumbent) | 97,849 | 70.71 |
| Republican | Charles R. Hargrave | 36,584 | 26.44 |
| Libertarian | Scott A. Wilson | 3,943 | 2.85 |
| Invalid or blank votes | | 7,463 | 5.12 |
| Total votes | | 145,839 | 100.00 |
| Turnout | | | |
| Democratic hold | | | |

== District 8 ==
2002 California's 8th congressional district election
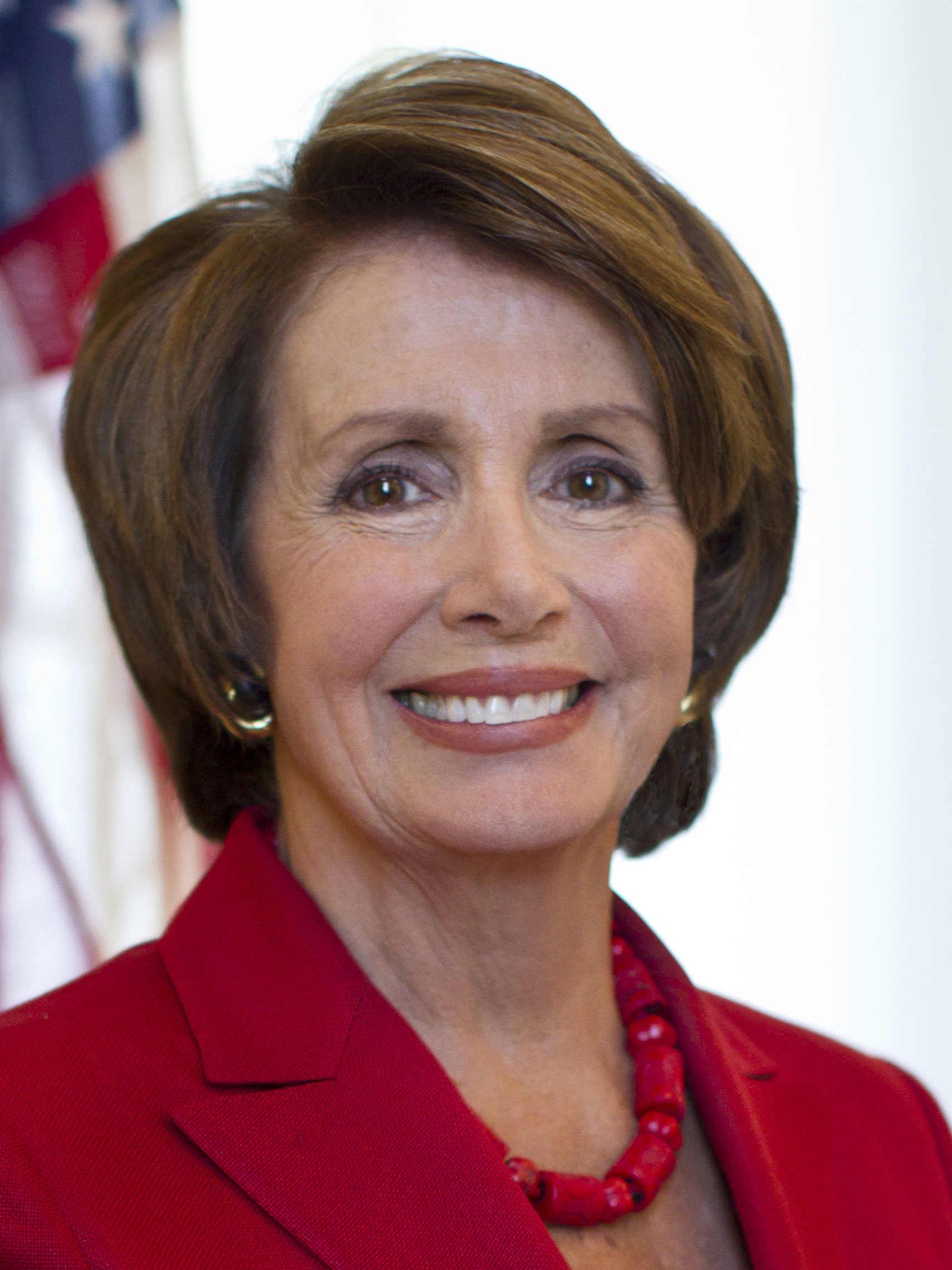

| Nominee | Nancy Pelosi | G. Michael German | Jay Pond |
| Party | Democratic | Republican | Green |
| Popular vote | 127,684 | 20,063 | 10,033 |
| Percentage | 79.6% | 12.5% | 6.3% |
- County results Pelosi: 70–80%
U.S. Representative before election
Nancy Pelosi
Democratic
Elected U.S. Representative
Nancy Pelosi
Democratic

=== Predictions ===
| Source | Ranking | As of |
|---|---|---|
| Sabato's Crystal Ball | Safe D | November 4, 2002 |
| New York Times | Safe D | October 14, 2002 |

=== Results ===
California's 8th congressional district election, 2002
| Party | Candidate | Votes | % |
|---|---|---|---|
| Democratic | Nancy Pelosi (incumbent) | 127,684 | 79.58 |
| Republican | G. Michael German | 20,063 | 12.50 |
| Green | Jay Pond | 10,033 | 6.25 |
| Libertarian | Ira Spivack | 2,659 | 1.66 |
| No party | Deborah Liatos (write-in) | 2 | 0.00 |
| Invalid or blank votes | | 0 | 0.00 |
| Total votes | | 160,441 | 100.00 |
| Turnout | | | |
| Democratic hold | | | |

== District 9 ==
2002 California's 9th congressional district election
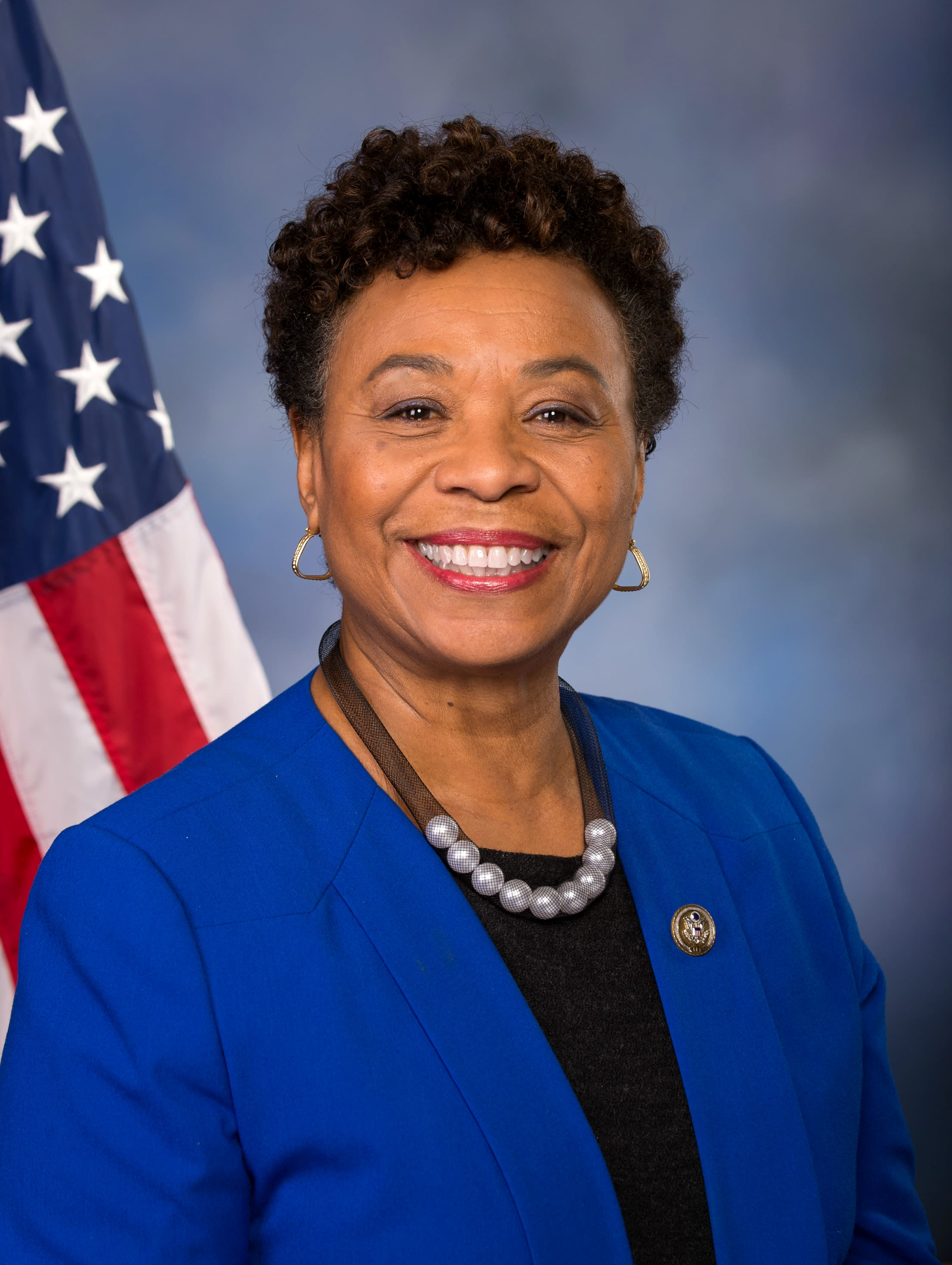

| Nominee | Barbara Lee | Jerald Udinsky |
| Party | Democratic | Republican |
| Popular vote | 135,893 | 25,333 |
| Percentage | 81.4% | 15.2% |
- County results Lee: 80–90%
U.S. Representative before election
Barbara Lee
Democratic
Elected U.S. Representative
Barbara Lee
Democratic

=== Predictions ===
| Source | Ranking | As of |
|---|---|---|
| Sabato's Crystal Ball | Safe D | November 4, 2002 |
| New York Times | Safe D | October 14, 2002 |

=== Results ===
California's 9th congressional district election, 2002
| Party | Candidate | Votes | % |
|---|---|---|---|
| Democratic | Barbara Lee (incumbent) | 135,893 | 81.41 |
| Republican | Jerald Udinsky | 25,333 | 15.18 |
| Libertarian | James M. Eyer | 5,685 | 3.41 |
| No party | Hector Reyna (write-in) | 6 | 0.00 |
| Invalid or blank votes | | 9,935 | 5.62 |
| Total votes | | 176,852 | 100.00 |
| Turnout | | | |
| Democratic hold | | | |

== District 10 ==
2002 California's 10th congressional district election
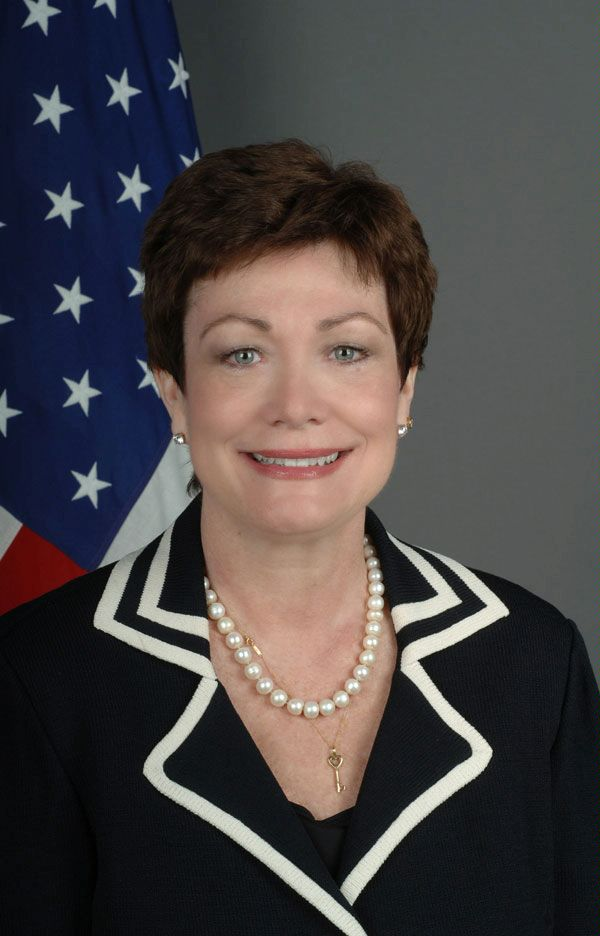

| Nominee | Ellen Tauscher | Sonia E. Alonso Harden |
| Party | Democratic | Libertarian |
| Popular vote | 126,390 | 40,807 |
| Percentage | 75.6% | 24.4% |
- County results Tauscher: 60–70% 70–80%
U.S. Representative before election
Ellen Tauscher
Democratic
Elected U.S. Representative
Ellen Tauscher
Democratic

=== Predictions ===
| Source | Ranking | As of |
|---|---|---|
| Sabato's Crystal Ball | Safe D | November 4, 2002 |
| New York Times | Safe D | October 14, 2002 |

=== Results ===
California's 10th congressional district election, 2002
| Party | Candidate | Votes | % |
|---|---|---|---|
| Democratic | Ellen Tauscher (incumbent) | 126,390 | 75.59 |
| Libertarian | Sonia E. Alonso Harden | 40,807 | 24.41 |
| Invalid or blank votes | | 24,148 | 12.62 |
| Total votes | | 191,345 | 100.00 |
| Turnout | | | |
| Democratic hold | | | |

== District 11 ==
2002 California's 11th congressional district election
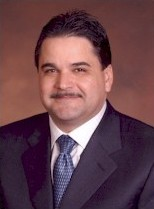

| Nominee | Richard Pombo | Elaine Shaw |
| Party | Republican | Democratic |
| Popular vote | 104,921 | 69,035 |
| Percentage | 60.3% | 39.7% |
- County results Pombo: 50–60% 60–70%
U.S. Representative before election
Richard Pombo
Republican
Elected U.S. Representative
Richard Pombo
Republican

=== Predictions ===
| Source | Ranking | As of |
|---|---|---|
| Sabato's Crystal Ball | Safe R | November 4, 2002 |
| New York Times | Safe R | October 14, 2002 |

=== Results ===
California's 11th congressional district election, 2002
| Party | Candidate | Votes | % |
|---|---|---|---|
| Republican | Richard Pombo (incumbent) | 104,921 | 60.31 |
| Democratic | Elaine Shaw | 69,035 | 39.69 |
| Invalid or blank votes | | 103,414 | 37.28 |
| Total votes | | 277,370 | 100.00 |
| Turnout | | | |
| Republican hold | | | |

== District 12 ==
2002 California's 12th congressional district election
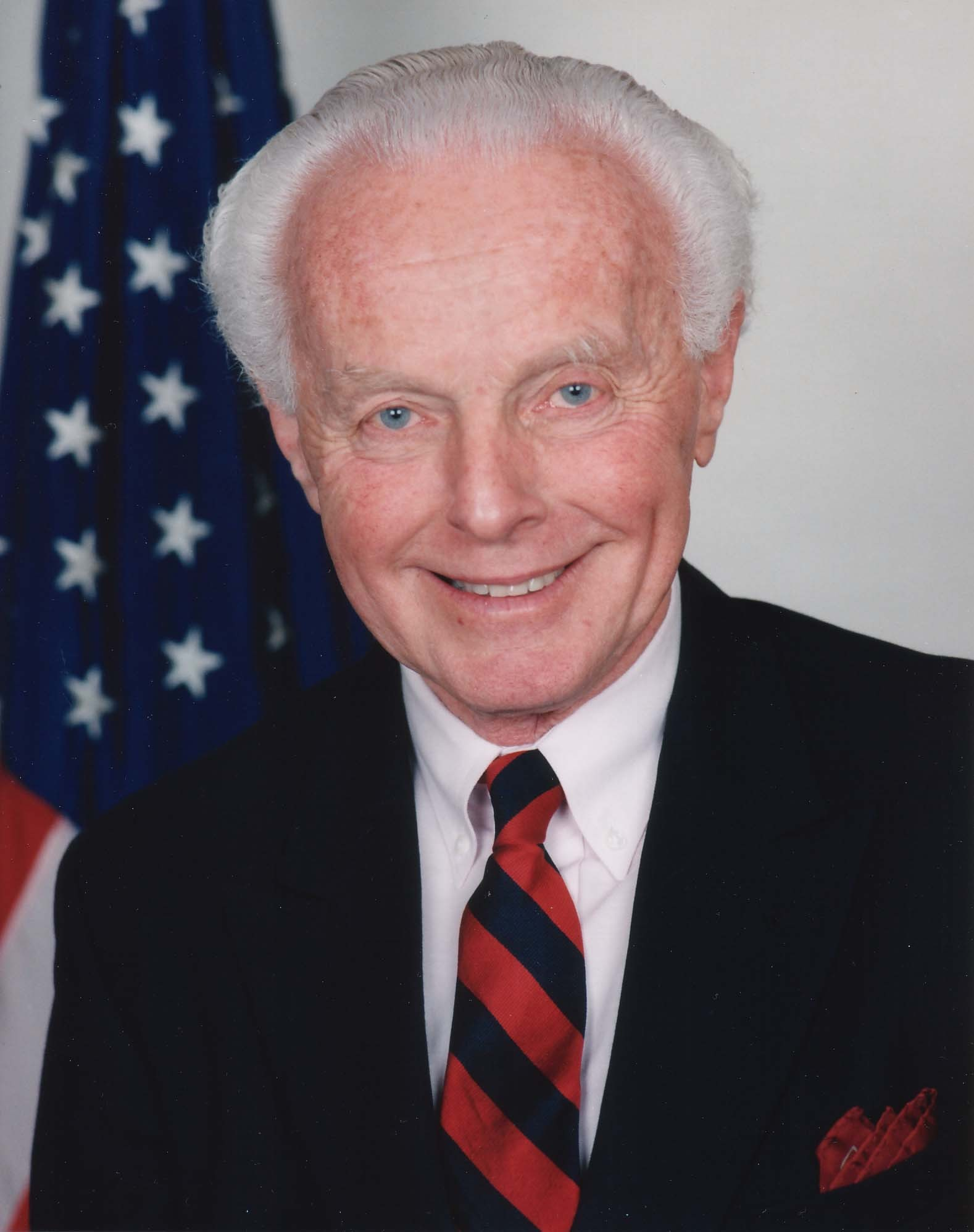

| Nominee | Tom Lantos | Michael J. Moloney | Maad Abu-Ghazalah |
| Party | Democratic | Republican | Libertarian |
| Popular vote | 105,597 | 38,381 | 11,006 |
| Percentage | 68.1% | 24.8% | 7.1% |
- County results Lantos: 60–70% 70–80%
U.S. Representative before election
Tom Lantos
Democratic
Elected U.S. Representative
Tom Lantos
Democratic

=== Predictions ===
| Source | Ranking | As of |
|---|---|---|
| Sabato's Crystal Ball | Safe D | November 4, 2002 |
| New York Times | Safe D | October 14, 2002 |

=== Results ===
California's 12th congressional district election, 2002
| Party | Candidate | Votes | % |
|---|---|---|---|
| Democratic | Tom Lantos (incumbent) | 105,597 | 68.13 |
| Republican | Michael J. Moloney | 38,381 | 24.76 |
| Libertarian | Maad Abu-Ghazalah | 11,006 | 7.10 |
| Invalid or blank votes | | 0 | 0.00 |
| Total votes | | 154,984 | 100.00 |
| Turnout | | | |
| Democratic hold | | | |

== District 13 ==
2002 California's 13th congressional district election
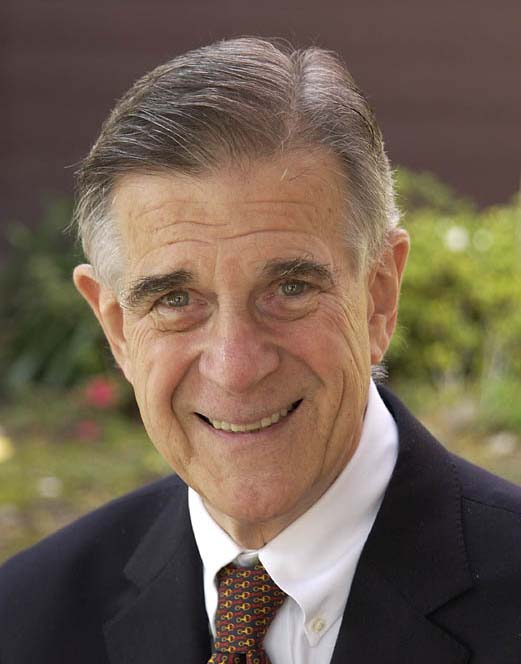

| Nominee | Pete Stark | Syed R. Mahmood |
| Party | Democratic | Republican |
| Popular vote | 86,495 | 26,852 |
| Percentage | 71.1% | 22.1% |
- County results Stark: 70–80%
U.S. Representative before election
Pete Stark
Democratic
Elected U.S. Representative
Pete Stark
Democratic

=== Predictions ===
| Source | Ranking | As of |
|---|---|---|
| Sabato's Crystal Ball | Safe D | November 4, 2002 |
| New York Times | Safe D | October 14, 2002 |

=== Results ===
California's 13th congressional district election, 2002
| Party | Candidate | Votes | % |
|---|---|---|---|
| Democratic | Pete Stark (incumbent) | 86,495 | 71.06 |
| Republican | Syed R. Mahmood | 26,852 | 22.06 |
| Libertarian | Mark W. Stroberg | 3,703 | 3.04 |
| American Independent | Don J. Grundmann | 2,772 | 2.28 |
| Reform | John J. Bambey | 1,901 | 1.56 |
| Invalid or blank votes | | 8,191 | 5.55 |
| Total votes | | 147,561 | 100.00 |
| Turnout | | | |
| Democratic hold | | | |

== District 14 ==
2002 California's 14th congressional district election
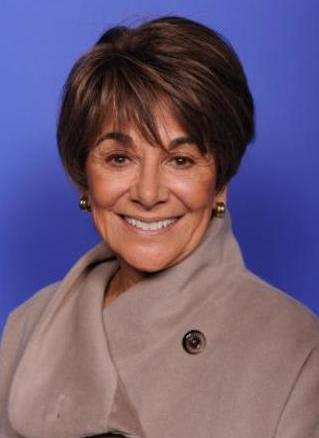

| Nominee | Anna Eshoo | Joe Nixon |
| Party | Democratic | Republican |
| Popular vote | 117,055 | 48,346 |
| Percentage | 68.2% | 28.2% |
- County results Eshoo: 60–70% 70–80%
U.S. Representative before election
Anna Eshoo
Democratic
Elected U.S. Representative
Anna Eshoo
Democratic

=== Predictions ===
| Source | Ranking | As of |
|---|---|---|
| Sabato's Crystal Ball | Safe D | November 4, 2002 |
| New York Times | Safe D | October 14, 2002 |

=== Results ===
California's 14th congressional district election, 2002
| Party | Candidate | Votes | % |
|---|---|---|---|
| Democratic | Anna Eshoo (incumbent) | 117,055 | 68.18 |
| Republican | Joe Nixon | 48,346 | 28.16 |
| Libertarian | Andrew B. Carver | 6,277 | 3.66 |
| Invalid or blank votes | | 43,430 | 20.19 |
| Total votes | | 215,108 | 100.00 |
| Turnout | | | |
| Democratic hold | | | |

== District 15 ==
2002 California's 15th congressional district election
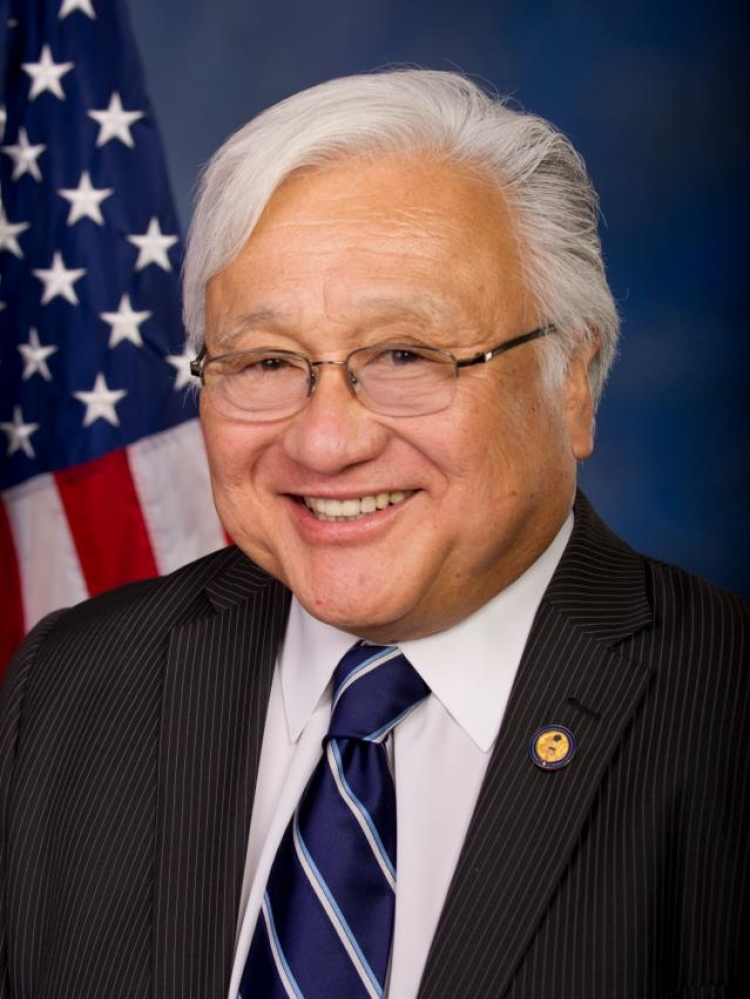

| Nominee | Mike Honda | Linda Rae Hermann |
| Party | Democratic | Republican |
| Popular vote | 87,482 | 41,251 |
| Percentage | 65.8% | 31.0% |
- County results Honda: 60–70%
U.S. Representative before election
Mike Honda
Democratic
Elected U.S. Representative
Mike Honda
Democratic

=== Predictions ===
| Source | Ranking | As of |
|---|---|---|
| Sabato's Crystal Ball | Safe D | November 4, 2002 |
| New York Times | Safe D | October 14, 2002 |

=== Results ===
California's 15th congressional district election, 2002
| Party | Candidate | Votes | % |
|---|---|---|---|
| Democratic | Mike Honda (incumbent) | 87,482 | 65.77 |
| Republican | Linda Rae Hermann | 41,251 | 31.01 |
| Libertarian | Jeff Landauer | 4,289 | 3.22 |
| Invalid or blank votes | | 9,231 | 6.49 |
| Total votes | | 142,253 | 100.00 |
| Turnout | | | |
| Democratic hold | | | |

== District 16 ==
2002 California's 16th congressional district election
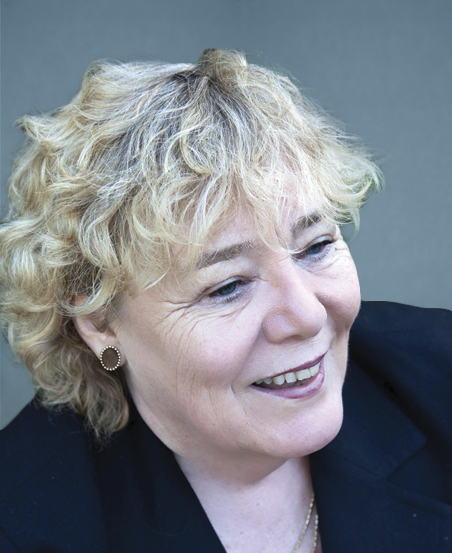

| Nominee | Zoe Lofgren | Douglas Adams McNea |
| Party | Democratic | Republican |
| Popular vote | 72,370 | 32,182 |
| Percentage | 67.0% | 29.8% |
- County results Lofgren: 60–70%
U.S. Representative before election
Zoe Lofgren
Democratic
Elected U.S. Representative
Zoe Lofgren
Democratic

=== Predictions ===
| Source | Ranking | As of |
|---|---|---|
| Sabato's Crystal Ball | Safe D | November 4, 2002 |
| New York Times | Safe D | October 14, 2002 |

=== Results ===
California's 16th congressional district election, 2002
| Party | Candidate | Votes | % |
|---|---|---|---|
| Democratic | Zoe Lofgren (incumbent) | 72,370 | 67.02 |
| Republican | Douglas Adams McNea | 32,182 | 29.80 |
| Libertarian | Dennis Michael Umphress | 3,434 | 3.18 |
| Invalid or blank votes | | 8,357 | 7.18 |
| Total votes | | 116,353 | 100.00 |
| Turnout | | | |
| Democratic hold | | | |

== District 17 ==
2002 California's 17th congressional district election
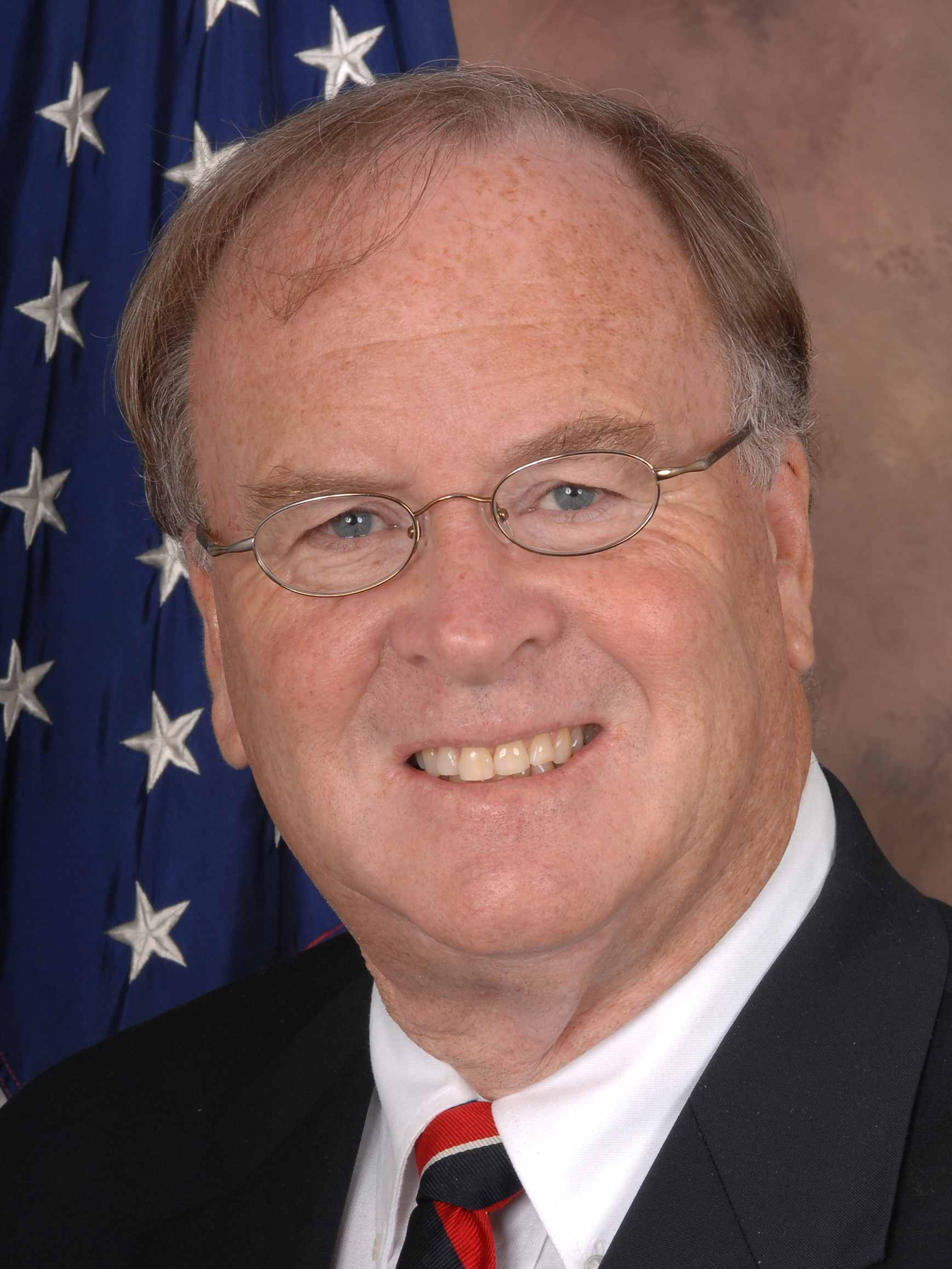

| Nominee | Sam Farr | Clint Engler |
| Party | Democratic | Republican |
| Popular vote | 101,632 | 40,334 |
| Percentage | 68.1% | 27.0% |
- County results Farr: 60–70% 70–80%
U.S. Representative before election
Sam Farr
Democratic
Elected U.S. Representative
Sam Farr
Democratic

=== Predictions ===
| Source | Ranking | As of |
|---|---|---|
| Sabato's Crystal Ball | Safe D | November 4, 2002 |
| New York Times | Safe D | October 14, 2002 |

=== Results ===
California's 17th congressional district election, 2002
| Party | Candidate | Votes | % |
|---|---|---|---|
| Democratic | Sam Farr (incumbent) | 101,632 | 68.07 |
| Republican | Clint Engler | 40,334 | 27.02 |
| Green | Ray Glock-Grueneich | 4,885 | 3.27 |
| Libertarian | Jascha Lee | 2,418 | 1.62 |
| No party | Alan Shugart (write-in) | 27 | 0.02 |
| Invalid or blank votes | | 5,967 | 3.84 |
| Total votes | | 155,263 | 100.00 |
| Turnout | | | |
| Democratic hold | | | |

== District 18 ==
2002 California's 18th congressional district election
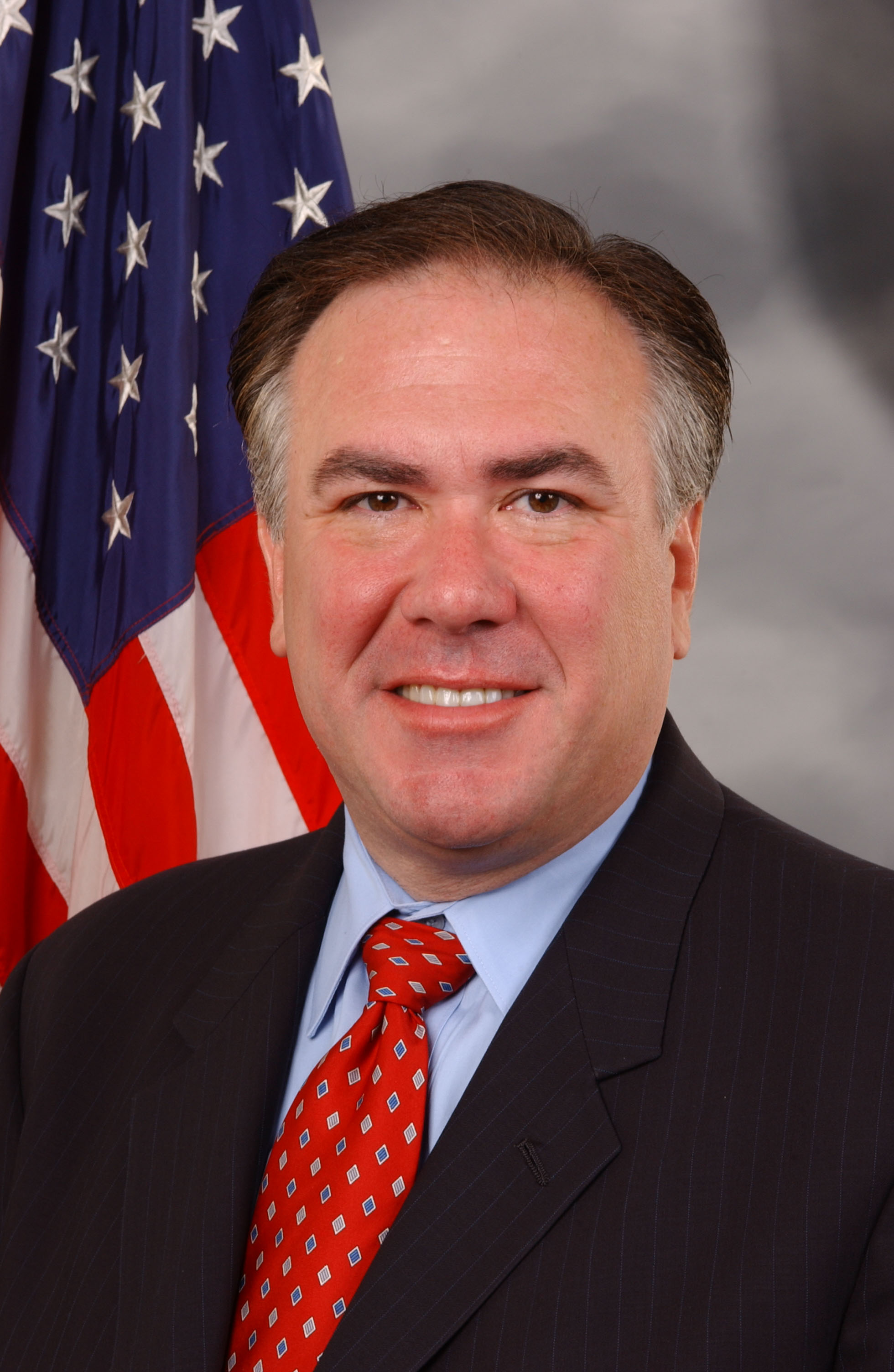

| Nominee | Dennis Cardoza | Dick Monteith |
| Party | Democratic | Republican |
| Popular vote | 56,181 | 47,528 |
| Percentage | 51.3% | 43.4% |
- County results Monteith: 40–50% 60–70% Cardoza: 60–70%
U.S. Representative before election
Gary Condit
Democratic
Elected U.S. Representative
Dennis Cardoza
Democratic

=== Predictions ===
| Source | Ranking | As of |
|---|---|---|
| Sabato's Crystal Ball | Lean D | November 4, 2002 |
| New York Times | Tossup | October 14, 2002 |

=== Results ===
California's 18th congressional district election, 2002
| Party | Candidate | Votes | % |
|---|---|---|---|
| Democratic | Dennis Cardoza | 56,181 | 51.26 |
| Republican | Dick Monteith | 47,528 | 43.37 |
| American Independent | Kevin H. Cripe | 3,641 | 3.32 |
| Libertarian | Linda De Groat | 2,194 | 2.00 |
| No party | Donna Crowder (write-in) | 49 | 0.04 |
| Invalid or blank votes | | 4,879 | 4.26 |
| Total votes | | 114,472 | 100.00 |
| Turnout | | | |
| Democratic hold | | | |

== District 19 ==
2002 California's 19th congressional district election
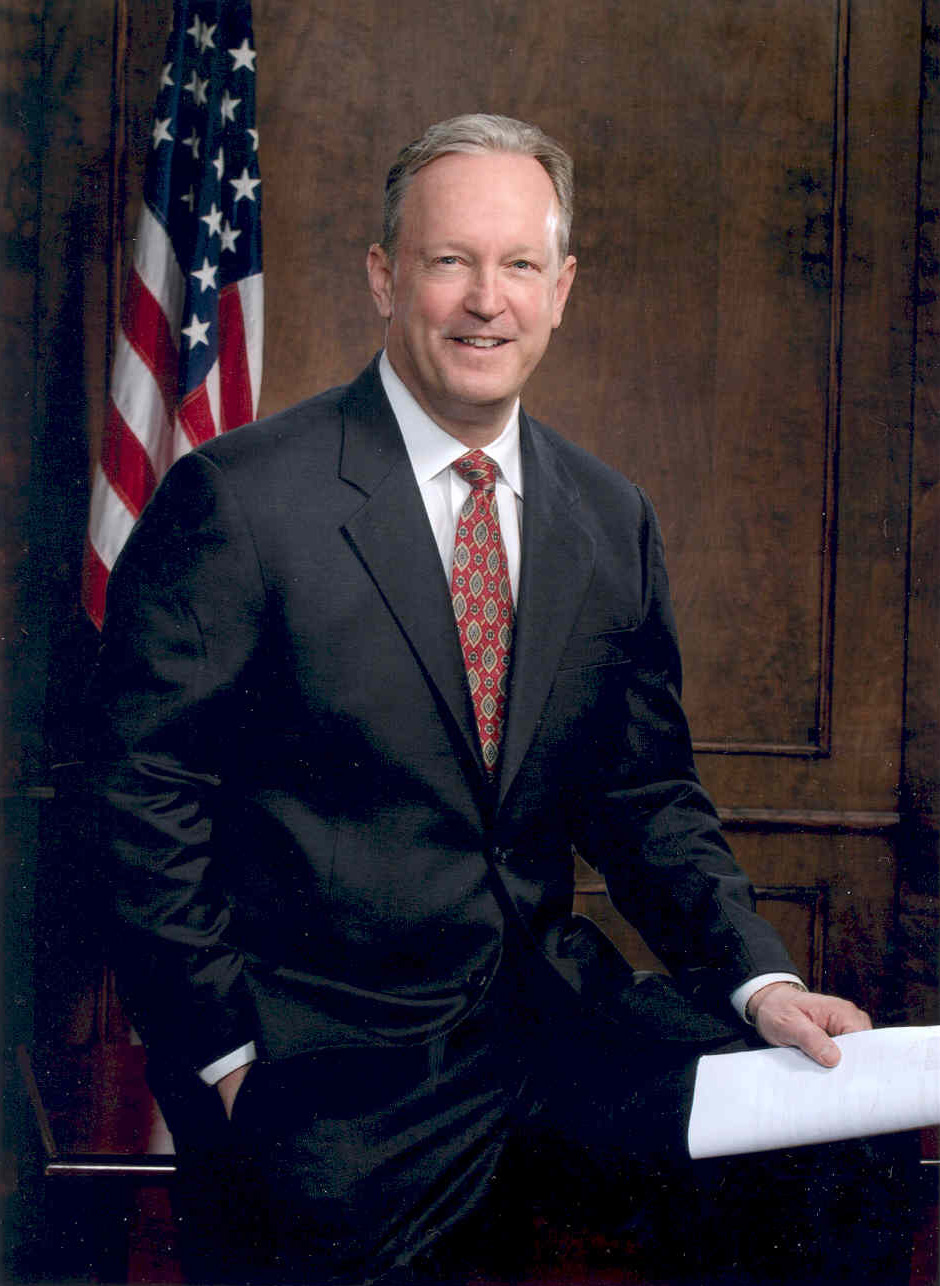

| Nominee | George Radanovich | John Veen |
| Party | Republican | Democratic |
| Popular vote | 106,209 | 47,403 |
| Percentage | 67.3% | 30.0% |
- County results Radanovich: 60–70% 70–80%
U.S. Representative before election
George Radanovich
Republican
Elected U.S. Representative
George Radanovich
Republican

=== Predictions ===
| Source | Ranking | As of |
|---|---|---|
| Sabato's Crystal Ball | Safe R | November 4, 2002 |
| New York Times | Safe R | October 14, 2002 |

=== Results ===
California's 19th congressional district election, 2002
| Party | Candidate | Votes | % |
|---|---|---|---|
| Republican | George Radanovich (incumbent) | 106,209 | 67.31 |
| Democratic | John Veen | 47,403 | 30.04 |
| Libertarian | Patrick Lee McHargue | 4,190 | 2.66 |
| Invalid or blank votes | | 8,296 | 4.99 |
| Total votes | | 166,098 | 100.00 |
| Turnout | | | |
| Republican hold | | | |

== District 20 ==
2002 California's 20th congressional district election
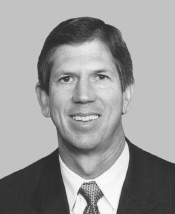

| Nominee | Cal Dooley | Andre Minuth |
| Party | Democratic | Republican |
| Popular vote | 47,627 | 25,628 |
| Percentage | 63.7% | 34.3% |
- County results Dooley: 60–70% 70–80% Minuth: 40–50%
U.S. Representative before election
Cal Dooley
Democratic
Elected U.S. Representative
Cal Dooley
Democratic

=== Predictions ===
| Source | Ranking | As of |
|---|---|---|
| Sabato's Crystal Ball | Safe D | November 4, 2002 |
| New York Times | Safe D | October 14, 2002 |

=== Results ===
California's 20th congressional district election, 2002
| Party | Candidate | Votes | % |
|---|---|---|---|
| Democratic | Cal Dooley (incumbent) | 47,627 | 63.70 |
| Republican | Andre Minuth | 25,628 | 34.28 |
| Libertarian | Varrin Swearingen | 1,515 | 2.03 |
| Invalid or blank votes | | 1,796 | 2.35 |
| Total votes | | 76,566 | 100.00 |
| Turnout | | | |
| Democratic hold | | | |

== District 21 ==
2002 California's 21st congressional district election
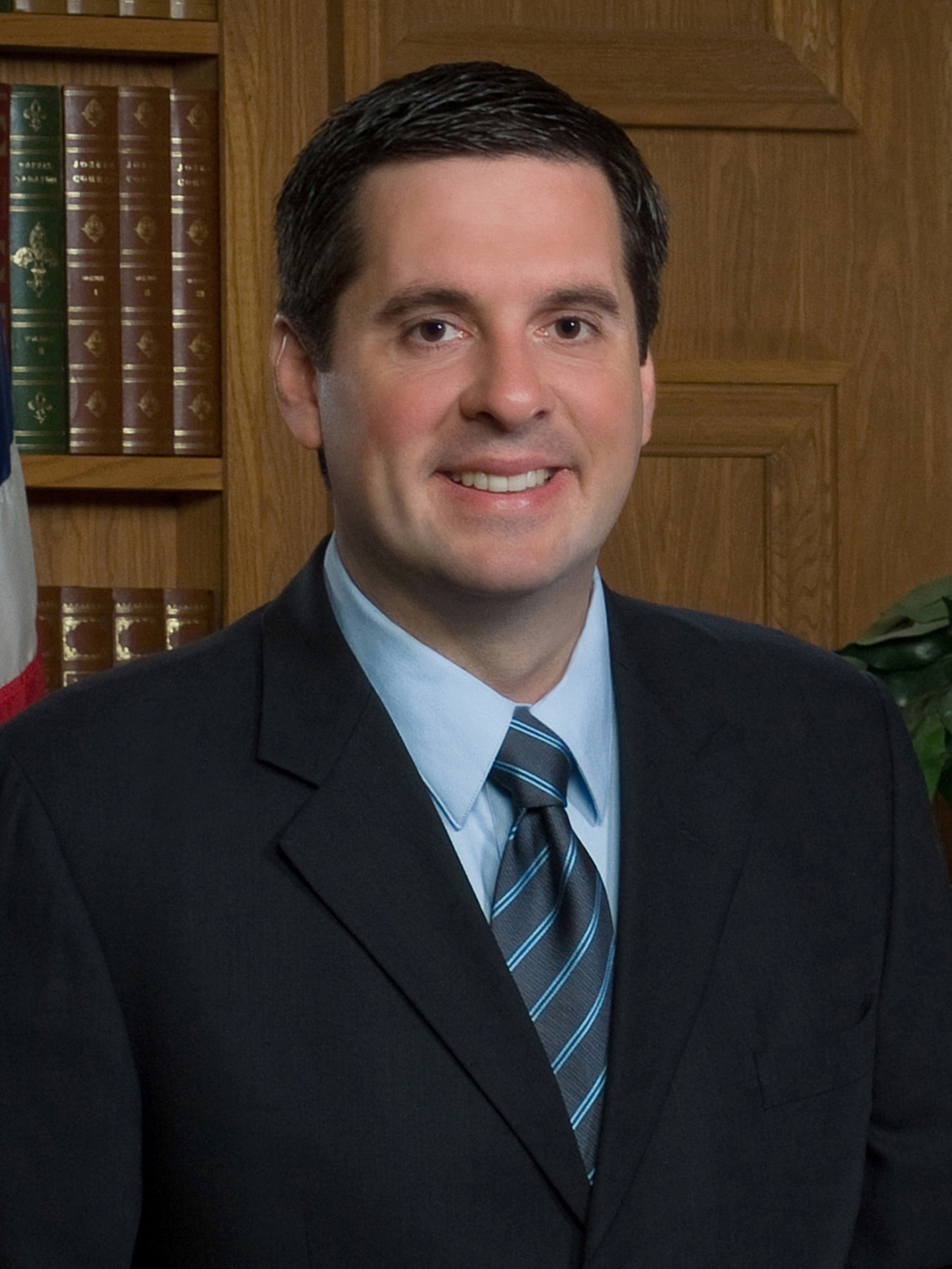

| Nominee | Devin Nunes | David G. LaPere |
| Party | Republican | Democratic |
| Popular vote | 87,544 | 32,584 |
| Percentage | 70.5% | 26.2% |
- County results Nunes: 60–70% 70–80%
U.S. Representative before election
Bill Thomas
Republican
Elected U.S. Representative
Devin Nunes
Republican

=== Predictions ===
| Source | Ranking | As of |
|---|---|---|
| Sabato's Crystal Ball | Safe R (flip) | November 4, 2002 |
| New York Times | Safe R (flip) | October 14, 2002 |

=== Results ===
California's 21st congressional district election, 2002
| Party | Candidate | Votes | % |
|---|---|---|---|
| Republican | Devin Nunes | 87,544 | 70.49 |
| Democratic | David G. LaPere | 32,584 | 26.24 |
| Libertarian | Jonathan Richter | 4,070 | 3.28 |
| Invalid or blank votes | | 5,223 | 4.04 |
| Total votes | | 129,421 | 100.00 |
| Turnout | | | |
| Republican win (new seat) | | | |

== District 22 ==
2002 California's 22nd congressional district election
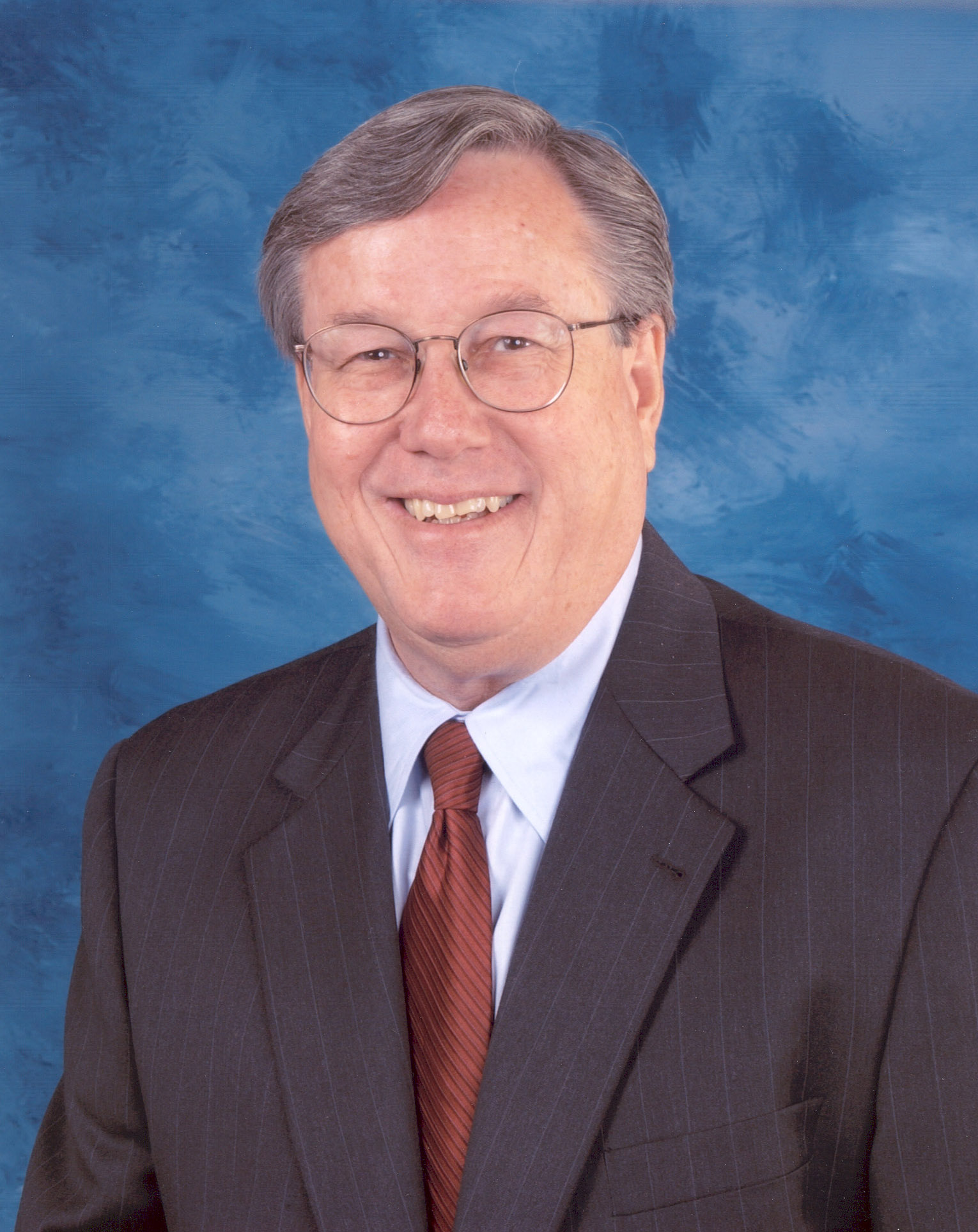

| Nominee | Bill Thomas | Jaime A. Corvera |
| Party | Republican | Democratic |
| Popular vote | 120,473 | 38,988 |
| Percentage | 73.3% | 23.7% |
- County results Thomas: 60–70% 70–80%
U.S. Representative before election
Bill Thomas
Republican
Elected U.S. Representative
Bill Thomas
Republican

=== Predictions ===
| Source | Ranking | As of |
|---|---|---|
| Sabato's Crystal Ball | Safe R | November 4, 2002 |
| New York Times | Safe R | October 14, 2002 |

=== Results ===
California's 22nd congressional district election, 2002
| Party | Candidate | Votes | % |
|---|---|---|---|
| Republican | Bill Thomas (incumbent) | 120,473 | 73.33 |
| Democratic | Jaime A. Corvera | 38,988 | 23.73 |
| Libertarian | Frank Coates | 4,824 | 2.94 |
| Invalid or blank votes | | 2,495 | 1.50 |
| Total votes | | 166,780 | 100.00 |
| Turnout | | | |
| Republican hold | | | |

== District 23 ==
2002 California's 23rd congressional district election
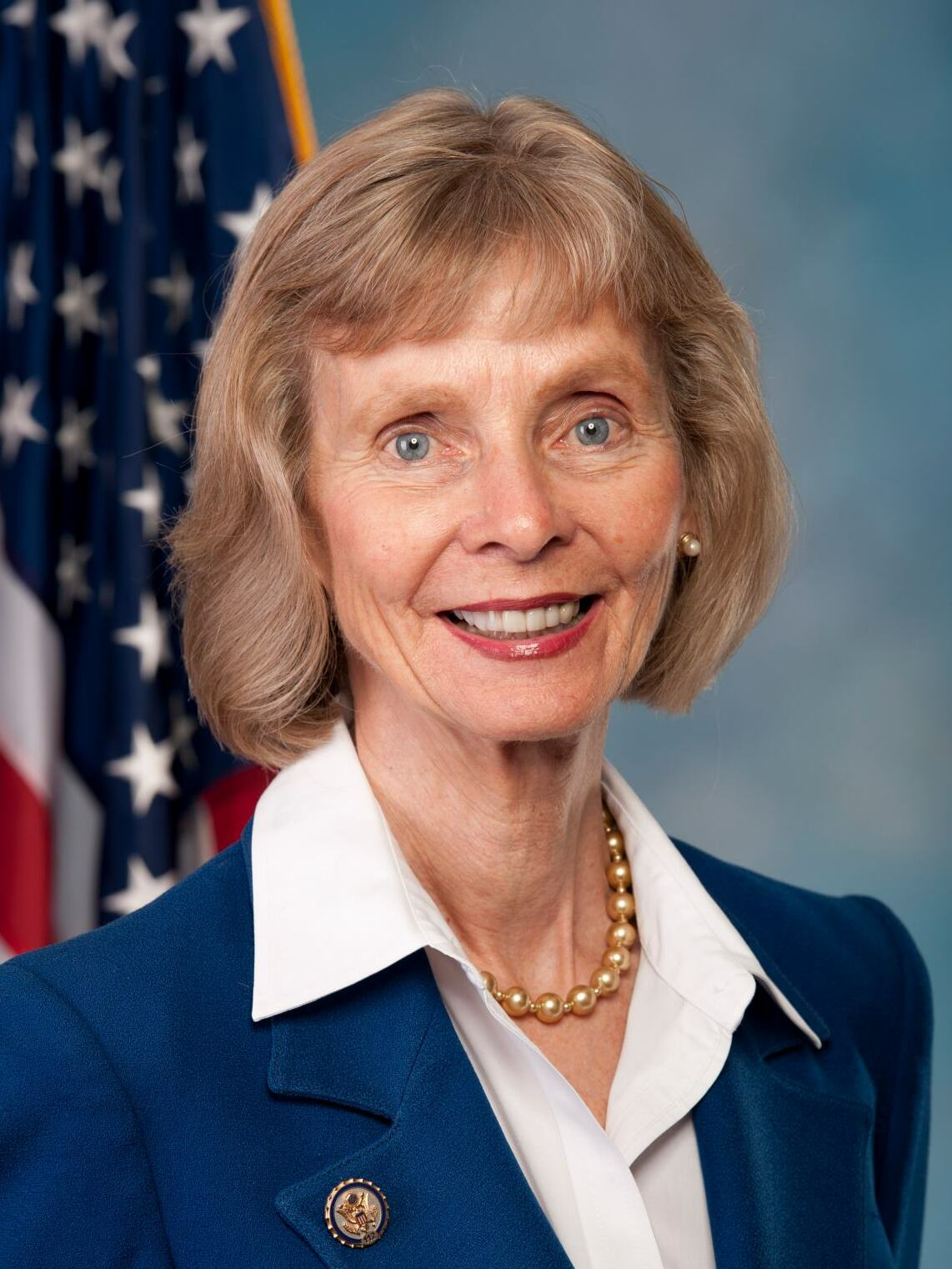

| Nominee | Lois Capps | Beth Rogers |
| Party | Democratic | Republican |
| Popular vote | 95,752 | 62,604 |
| Percentage | 59.0% | 38.6% |
- County results Capps: 50–60% 60–70%
U.S. Representative before election
Lois Capps
Democratic
Elected U.S. Representative
Lois Capps
Democratic

=== Predictions ===
| Source | Ranking | As of |
|---|---|---|
| Sabato's Crystal Ball | Safe D | November 4, 2002 |
| New York Times | Safe D | October 14, 2002 |

=== Results ===
California's 23rd congressional district election, 2002
| Party | Candidate | Votes | % |
|---|---|---|---|
| Democratic | Lois Capps (incumbent) | 95,752 | 59.03 |
| Republican | Beth Rogers | 62,604 | 38.59 |
| Libertarian | James E. Hill | 3,866 | 2.38 |
| Invalid or blank votes | | 2,415 | 1.47 |
| Total votes | | 164,637 | 100.00 |
| Turnout | | | |
| Democratic hold | | | |

== District 24 ==
2002 California's 24th congressional district election
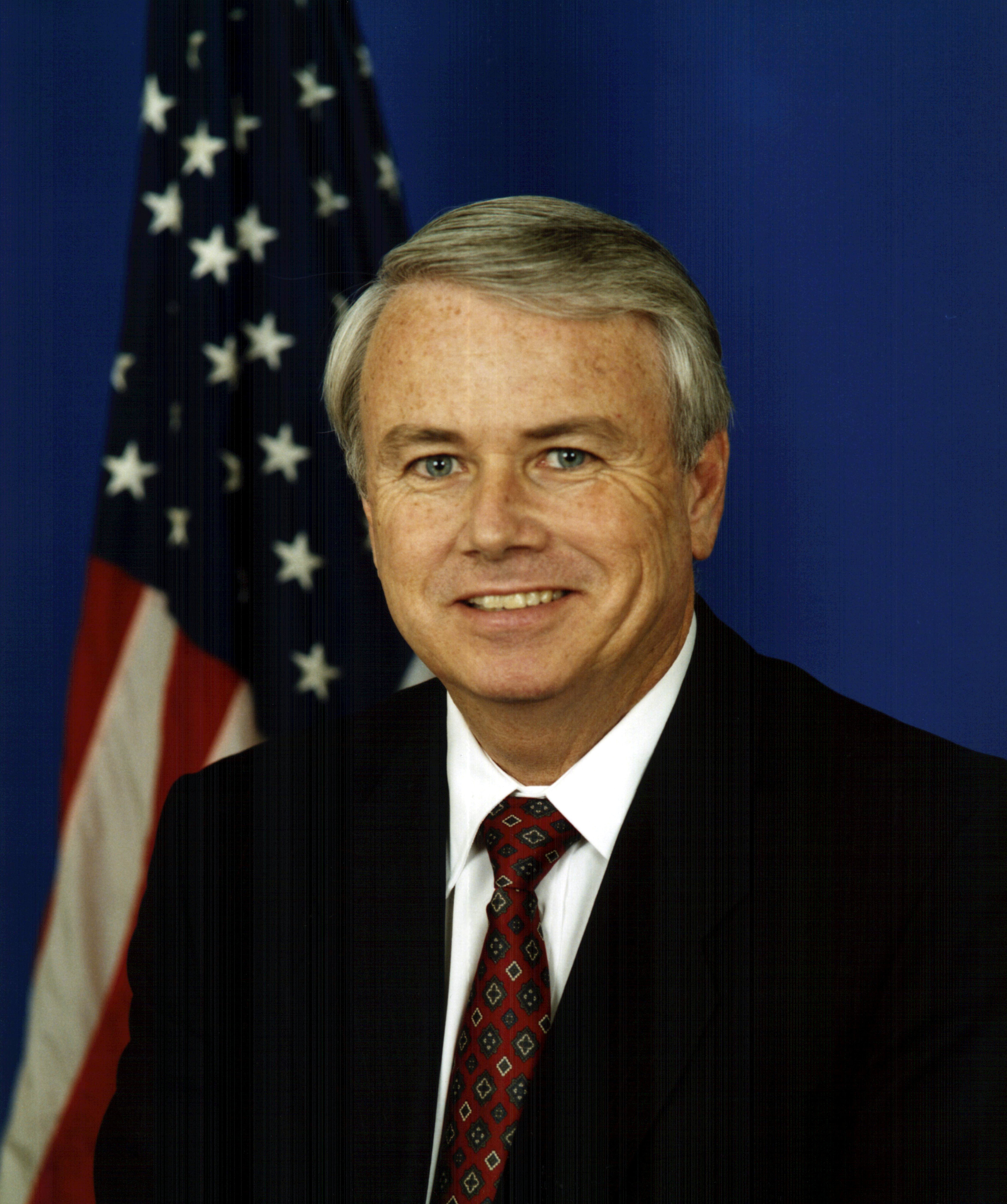

| Nominee | Elton Gallegly | Fern Rudin |
| Party | Republican | Democratic |
| Popular vote | 120,585 | 58,755 |
| Percentage | 65.2% | 31.8% |
- County results Gallegly: 60–70%
U.S. Representative before election
Elton Gallegly
Republican
Elected U.S. Representative
Elton Gallegly
Republican

=== Predictions ===
| Source | Ranking | As of |
|---|---|---|
| Sabato's Crystal Ball | Safe R | November 4, 2002 |
| New York Times | Safe R | October 14, 2002 |

=== Results ===
California's 24th congressional district election, 2002
| Party | Candidate | Votes | % |
|---|---|---|---|
| Republican | Elton Gallegly (incumbent) | 120,585 | 65.18 |
| Democratic | Fern Rudin | 58,755 | 31.76 |
| Libertarian | Gary Harber | 5,666 | 3.06 |
| Invalid or blank votes | | 7,819 | 4.05 |
| Total votes | | 192,825 | 100.00 |
| Turnout | | | |
| Republican hold | | | |

== District 25 ==
2002 California's 25th congressional district election
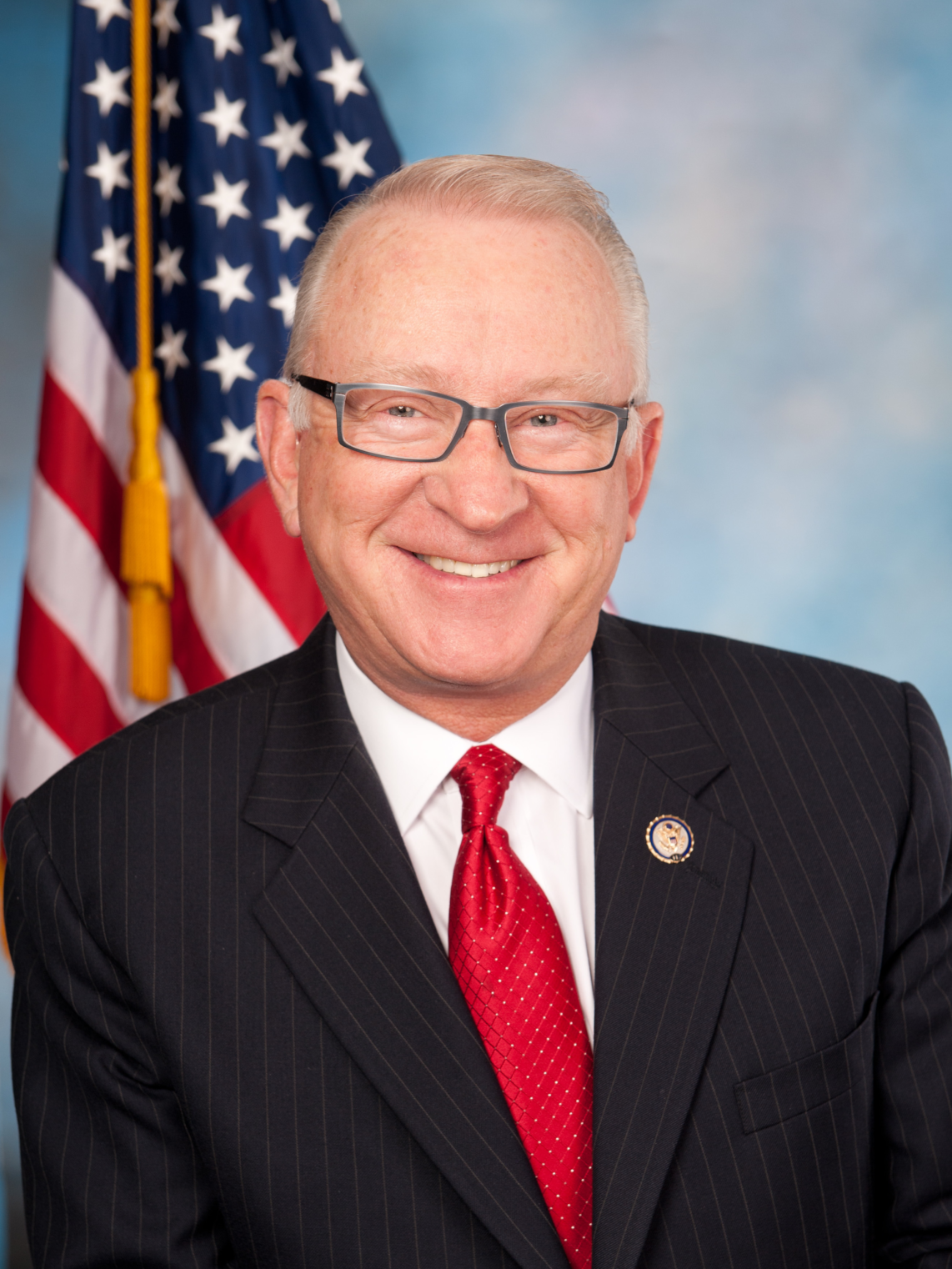

| Nominee | Howard McKeon | Bob Conaway |
| Party | Republican | Democratic |
| Popular vote | 80,775 | 38,674 |
| Percentage | 65.0% | 31.1% |
- County results Mckeon: 50–60% 60–70%
U.S. Representative before election
Howard McKeon
Republican
Elected U.S. Representative
Howard McKeon
Republican

=== Predictions ===
| Source | Ranking | As of |
|---|---|---|
| Sabato's Crystal Ball | Safe R | November 4, 2002 |
| New York Times | Safe R | October 14, 2002 |

=== Results ===
California's 25th congressional district election, 2002
| Party | Candidate | Votes | % |
|---|---|---|---|
| Republican | Howard McKeon (incumbent) | 80,775 | 64.97 |
| Democratic | Bob Conaway | 38,674 | 31.10 |
| Libertarian | Frank M. Consolo, Jr. | 4,887 | 3.93 |
| Invalid or blank votes | | 6,105 | 4.68 |
| Total votes | | 130,441 | 100.00 |
| Turnout | | | |
| Republican hold | | | |

== District 26 ==
2002 California's 26th congressional district election
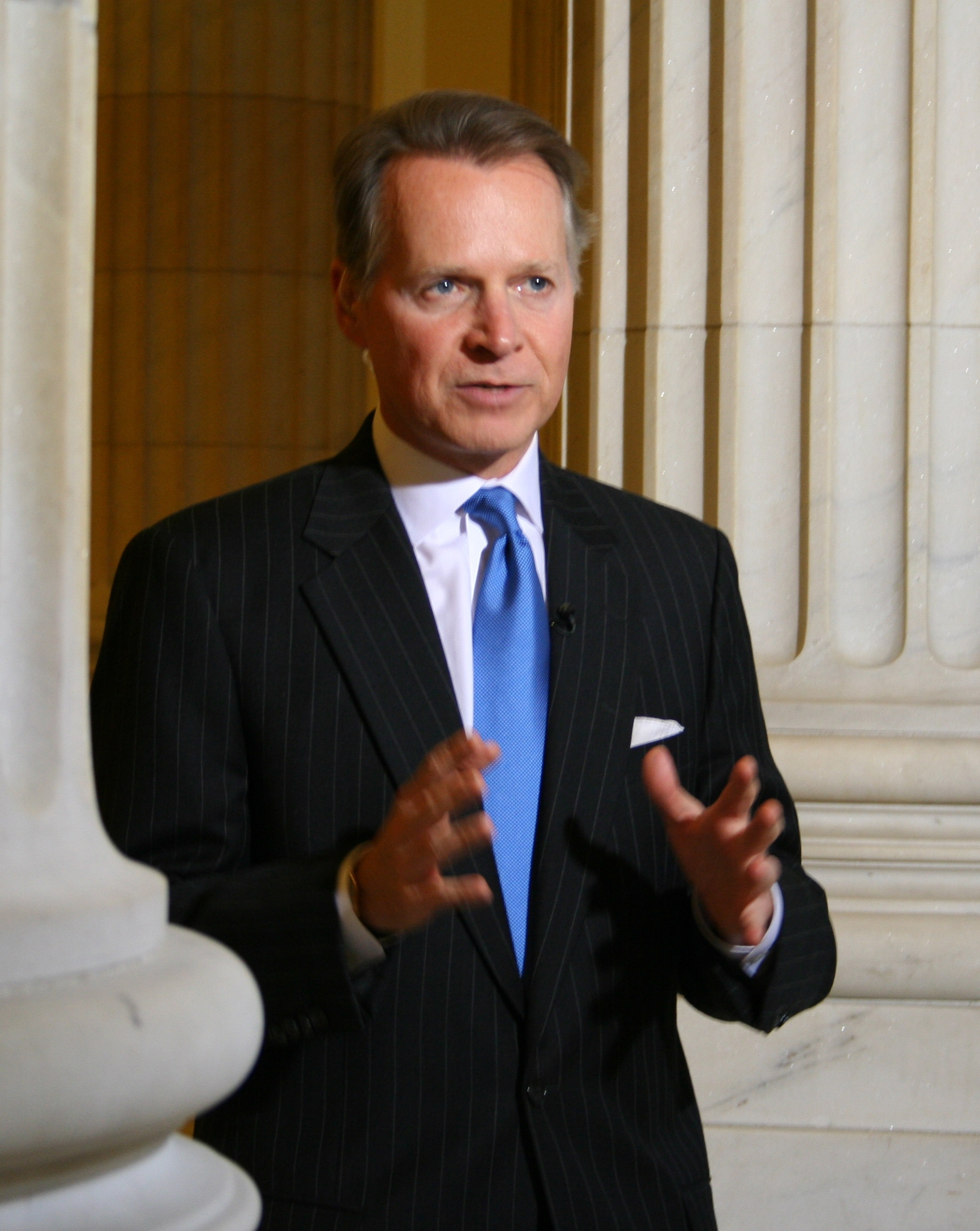

| Nominee | David Dreier | Marjorie Musser Mikels |
| Party | Republican | Democratic |
| Popular vote | 95,360 | 50,081 |
| Percentage | 63.8% | 33.5% |
- County results Dreier: 60–70%
U.S. Representative before election
David Dreier
Republican
Elected U.S. Representative
David Dreier
Republican

=== Predictions ===
| Source | Ranking | As of |
|---|---|---|
| Sabato's Crystal Ball | Safe R | November 4, 2002 |
| New York Times | Safe R | October 14, 2002 |

=== Results ===
California's 26th congressional district election, 2002
| Party | Candidate | Votes | % |
|---|---|---|---|
| Republican | David Dreier (incumbent) | 95,360 | 63.77 |
| Democratic | Marjorie Musser Mikels | 50,081 | 33.49 |
| Libertarian | Randall Weissbuch | 4,089 | 2.73 |
| Invalid or blank votes | | 9,816 | 6.16 |
| Total votes | | 159,346 | 100.00 |
| Turnout | | | |
| Republican hold | | | |

== District 27 ==
2002 California's 27th congressional district election
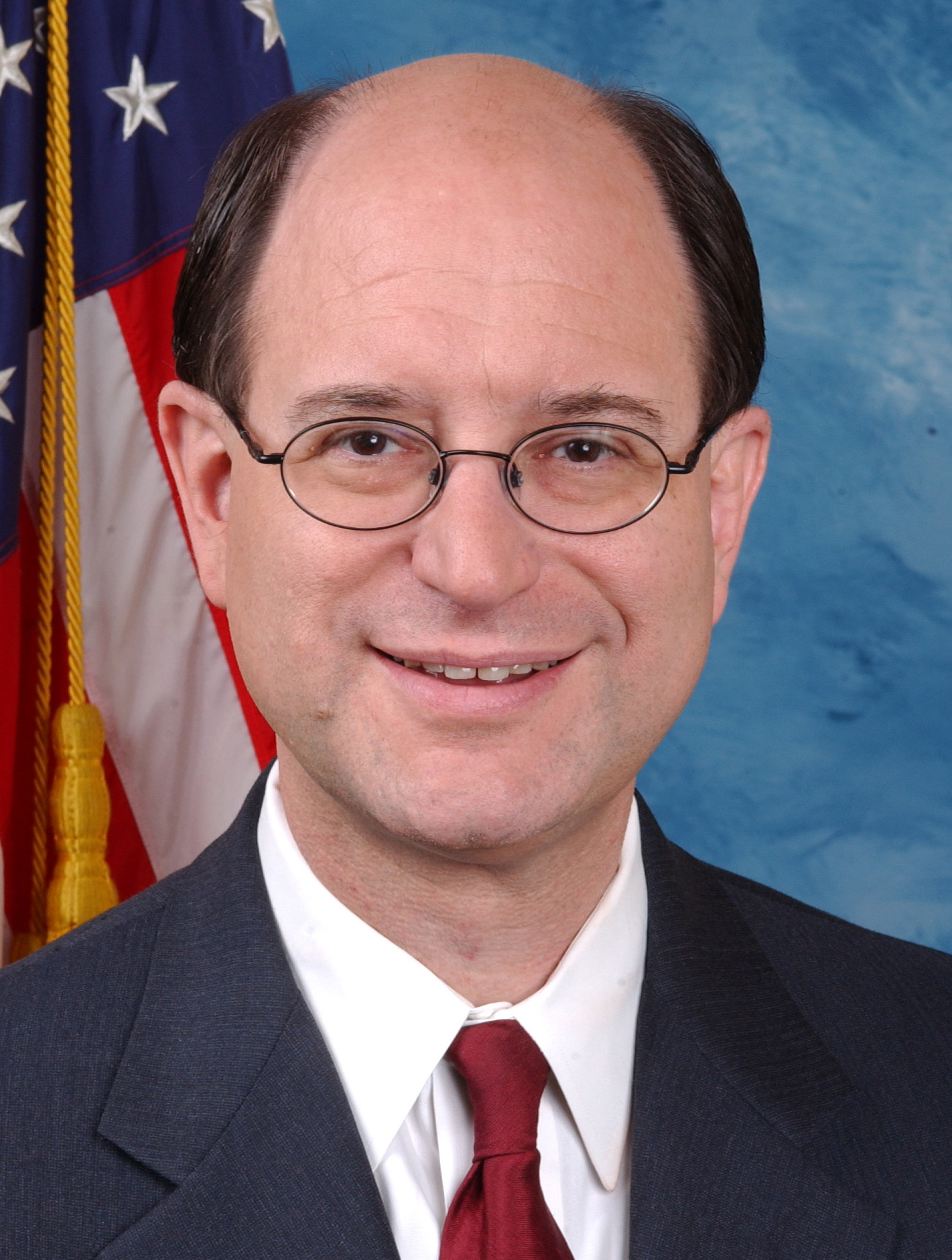

| Nominee | Brad Sherman | Robert M. Levy |
| Party | Democratic | Republican |
| Popular vote | 79,815 | 48,996 |
| Percentage | 62.0% | 38.0% |
- County results Sherman: 60–70%
U.S. Representative before election
Brad Sherman
Democratic
Elected U.S. Representative
Brad Sherman
Democratic

=== Predictions ===
| Source | Ranking | As of |
|---|---|---|
| Sabato's Crystal Ball | Safe D | November 4, 2002 |
| New York Times | Safe D | October 14, 2002 |

=== Results ===
California's 27th congressional district election, 2002
| Party | Candidate | Votes | % |
|---|---|---|---|
| Democratic | Brad Sherman (incumbent) | 79,815 | 61.96 |
| Republican | Robert M. Levy | 48,996 | 38.04 |
| Invalid or blank votes | | 10,561 | 7.58 |
| Total votes | | 139,372 | 100.00 |
| Turnout | | | |
| Democratic hold | | | |

== District 28 ==
2002 California's 28th congressional district election
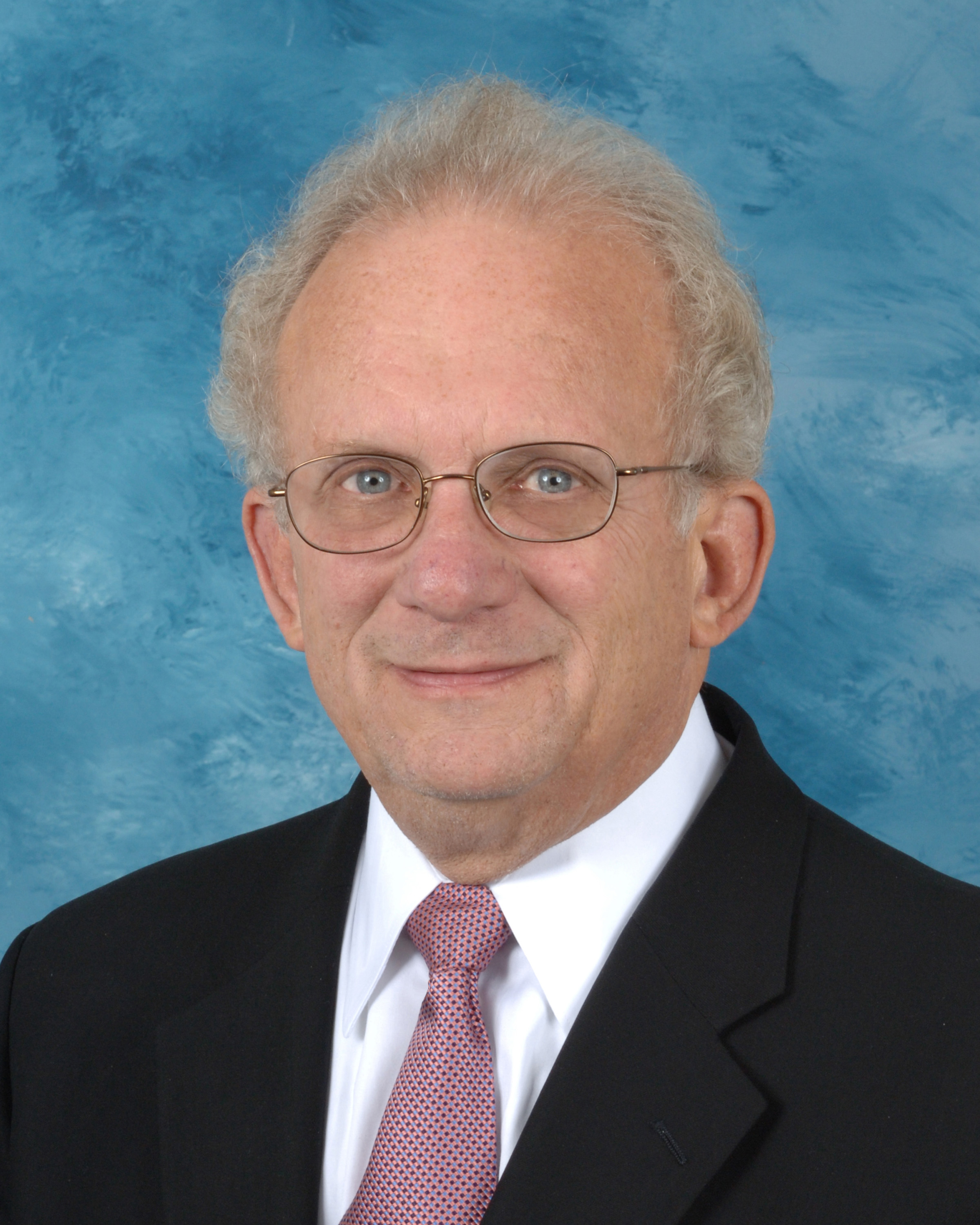

| Nominee | Howard Berman | David R. Hernandez, Jr. | Kelley L. Ross |
| Party | Democratic | Republican | Libertarian |
| Popular vote | 73,771 | 23,926 | 5,629 |
| Percentage | 71.4% | 23.2% | 5.5% |
- County results Berman: 70–80%
U.S. Representative before election
Howard Berman
Democratic
Elected U.S. Representative
Howard Berman
Democratic

=== Predictions ===
| Source | Ranking | As of |
|---|---|---|
| Sabato's Crystal Ball | Safe D | November 4, 2002 |
| New York Times | Safe D | October 14, 2002 |

=== Results ===
California's 28th congressional district election, 2002
| Party | Candidate | Votes | % |
|---|---|---|---|
| Democratic | Howard Berman (incumbent) | 73,771 | 71.40 |
| Republican | David R. Hernandez, Jr. | 23,926 | 23.16 |
| Libertarian | Kelley L. Ross | 5,629 | 5.45 |
| Invalid or blank votes | | 7,947 | 7.14 |
| Total votes | | 111,273 | 100.00 |
| Turnout | | | |
| Democratic hold | | | |

== District 29 ==
2002 California's 29th congressional district election
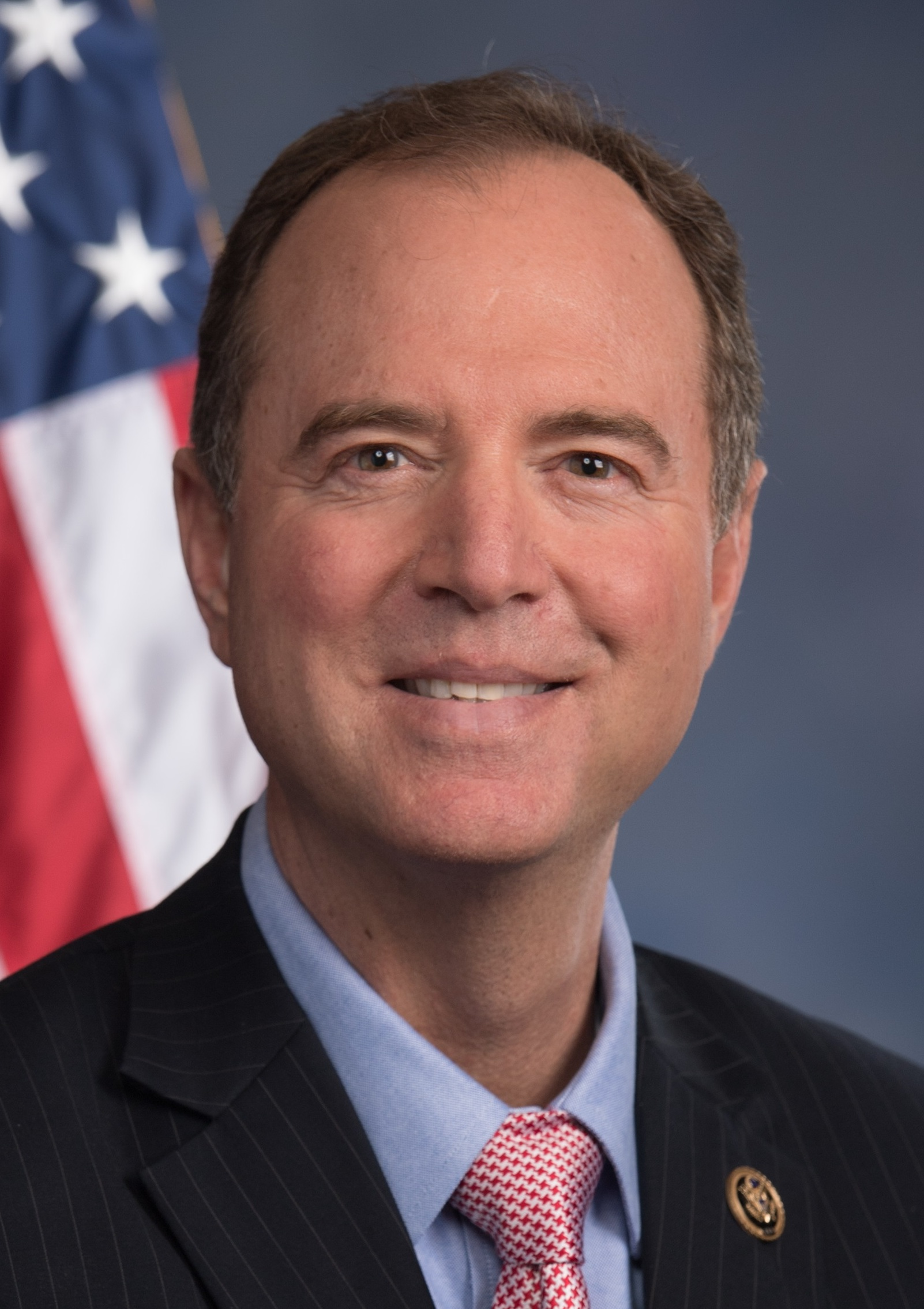

| Nominee | Adam Schiff | Jim Scileppi |
| Party | Democratic | Republican |
| Popular vote | 76,036 | 40,616 |
| Percentage | 62.6% | 33.4% |
- County results Schiff: 60–70%
U.S. Representative before election
Adam Schiff
Democratic
Elected U.S. Representative
Adam Schiff
Democratic

=== Predictions ===
| Source | Ranking | As of |
|---|---|---|
| Sabato's Crystal Ball | Safe D | November 4, 2002 |
| New York Times | Safe D | October 14, 2002 |

=== Results ===
California's 29th congressional district election, 2002
| Party | Candidate | Votes | % |
|---|---|---|---|
| Democratic | Adam Schiff (incumbent) | 76,036 | 62.56 |
| Republican | Jim Scileppi | 40,616 | 33.42 |
| Libertarian | Ted Brown | 4,889 | 4.02 |
| Invalid or blank votes | | 8,774 | 6.73 |
| Total votes | | 130,315 | 100.00 |
| Turnout | | | |
| Democratic hold | | | |

== District 30 ==
2002 California's 30th congressional district election
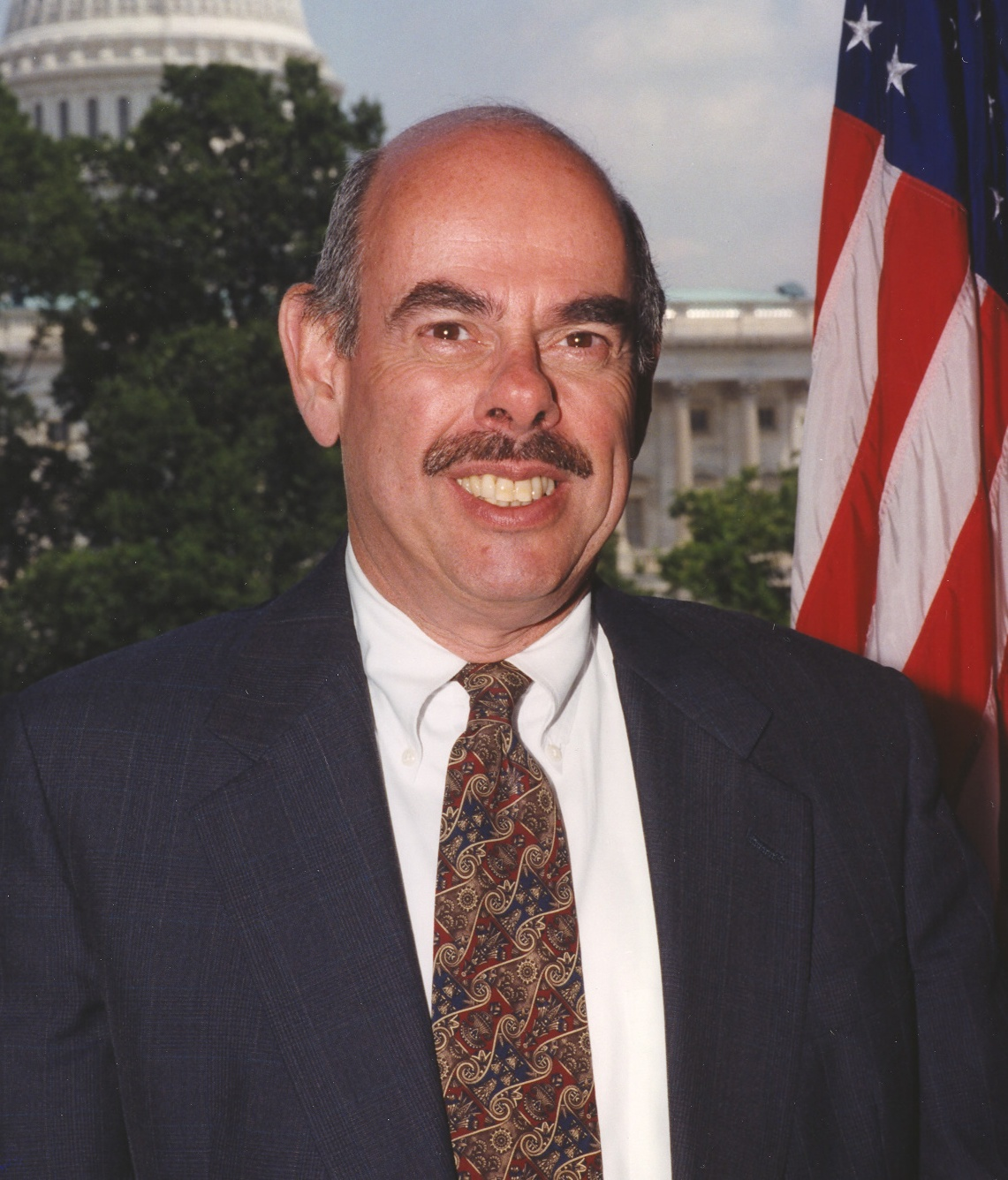

| Nominee | Henry Waxman | Tony D. Goss |
| Party | Democratic | Republican |
| Popular vote | 130,604 | 54,989 |
| Percentage | 70.4% | 29.6% |
- County results Waxman: 70–80%
U.S. Representative before election
Henry Waxman
Democratic
Elected U.S. Representative
Henry Waxman
Democratic

=== Predictions ===
| Source | Ranking | As of |
|---|---|---|
| Sabato's Crystal Ball | Safe D | November 4, 2002 |
| New York Times | Safe D | October 14, 2002 |

=== Results ===
California's 30th congressional district election, 2002
| Party | Candidate | Votes | % |
|---|---|---|---|
| Democratic | Henry Waxman (incumbent) | 130,604 | 70.37 |
| Republican | Tony D. Goss | 54,989 | 29.63 |
| Invalid or blank votes | | 12,684 | 6.40 |
| Total votes | | 198,277 | 100.00 |
| Turnout | | | |
| Democratic hold | | | |

== District 31 ==
2002 California's 31st congressional district election
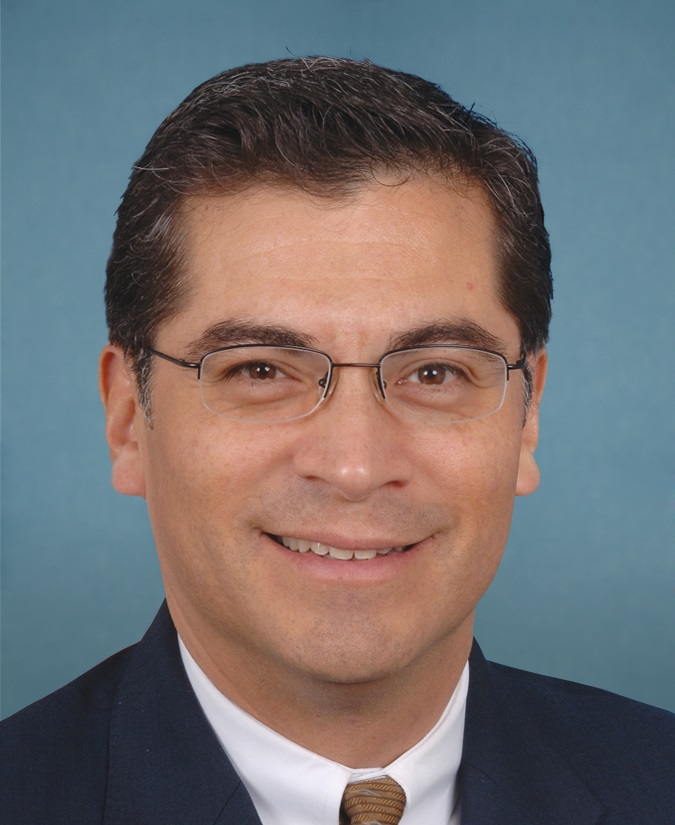

| Nominee | Xavier Becerra | Luis Vega |
| Party | Democratic | Republican |
| Popular vote | 54,569 | 12,674 |
| Percentage | 81.2% | 18.9% |
- County results Becerra: 80–90%
U.S. Representative before election
Xavier Becerra
Democratic
Elected U.S. Representative
Xavier Becerra
Democratic

=== Predictions ===
| Source | Ranking | As of |
|---|---|---|
| Sabato's Crystal Ball | Safe D | November 4, 2002 |
| New York Times | Safe D | October 14, 2002 |

=== Results ===
California's 31st congressional district election, 2002
| Party | Candidate | Votes | % |
|---|---|---|---|
| Democratic | Xavier Becerra (incumbent) | 54,569 | 81.15 |
| Republican | Luis Vega | 12,674 | 18.85 |
| Invalid or blank votes | | 5,635 | 7.73 |
| Total votes | | 72,878 | 100.00 |
| Turnout | | | |
| Democratic hold | | | |

== District 32 ==
2002 California's 32nd congressional district election
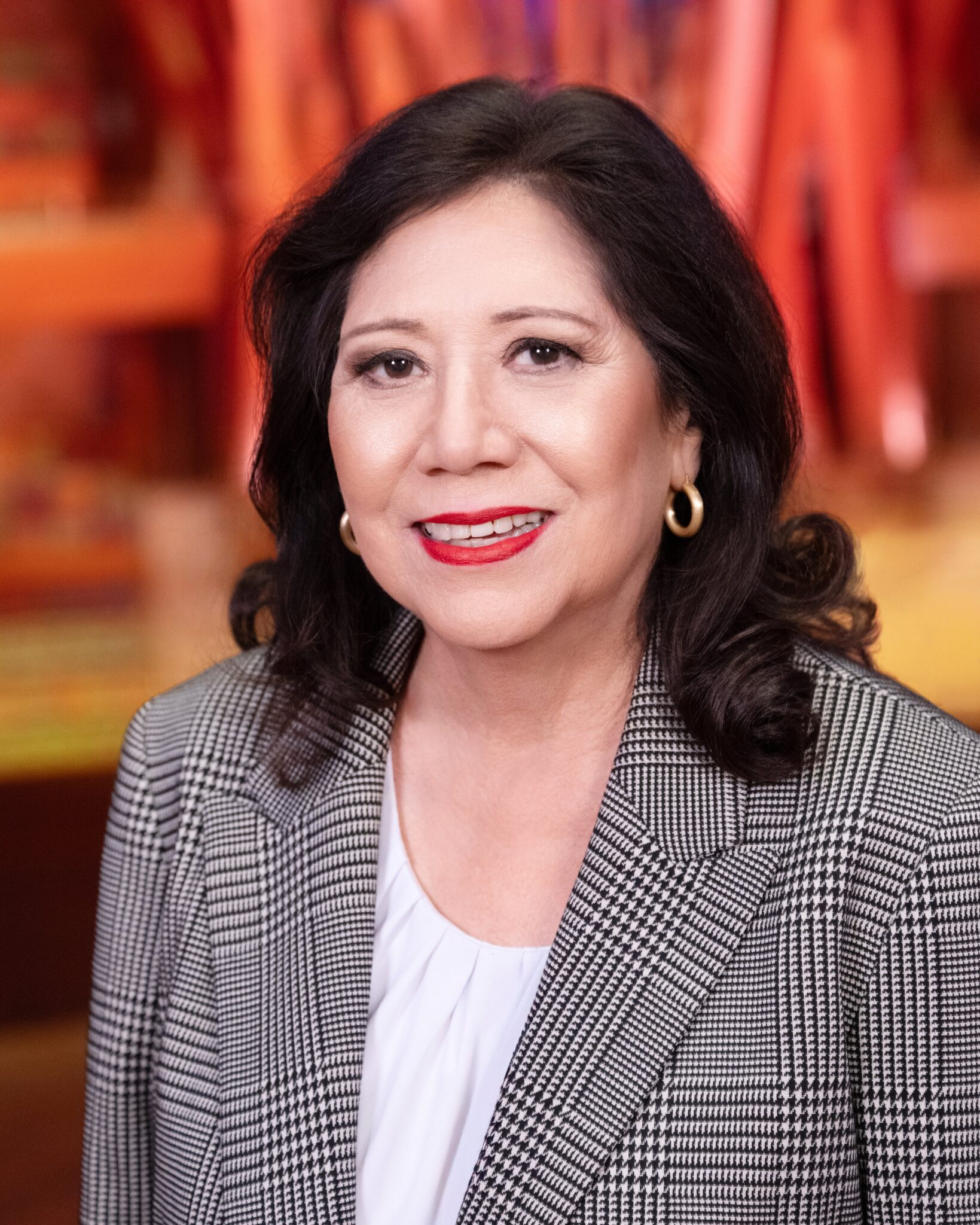

| Nominee | Hilda Solis | Emma E. Fischbeck |
| Party | Democratic | Republican |
| Popular vote | 58,530 | 23,366 |
| Percentage | 68.8% | 27.5% |
- County results Solis: 60–70%
U.S. Representative before election
Hilda Solis
Democratic
Elected U.S. Representative
Hilda Solis
Democratic

=== Predictions ===
| Source | Ranking | As of |
|---|---|---|
| Sabato's Crystal Ball | Safe D | November 4, 2002 |
| New York Times | Safe D | October 14, 2002 |

=== Results ===
California's 32nd congressional district election, 2002
| Party | Candidate | Votes | % |
|---|---|---|---|
| Democratic | Hilda Solis (incumbent) | 58,530 | 68.79 |
| Republican | Emma E. Fischbeck | 23,366 | 27.46 |
| Libertarian | Michael "Mick" McGuire | 3,183 | 3.74 |
| Invalid or blank votes | | 5,580 | 6.15 |
| Total votes | | 90,659 | 100.00 |
| Turnout | | | |
| Democratic hold | | | |

== District 33 ==
2002 California's 33rd congressional district election
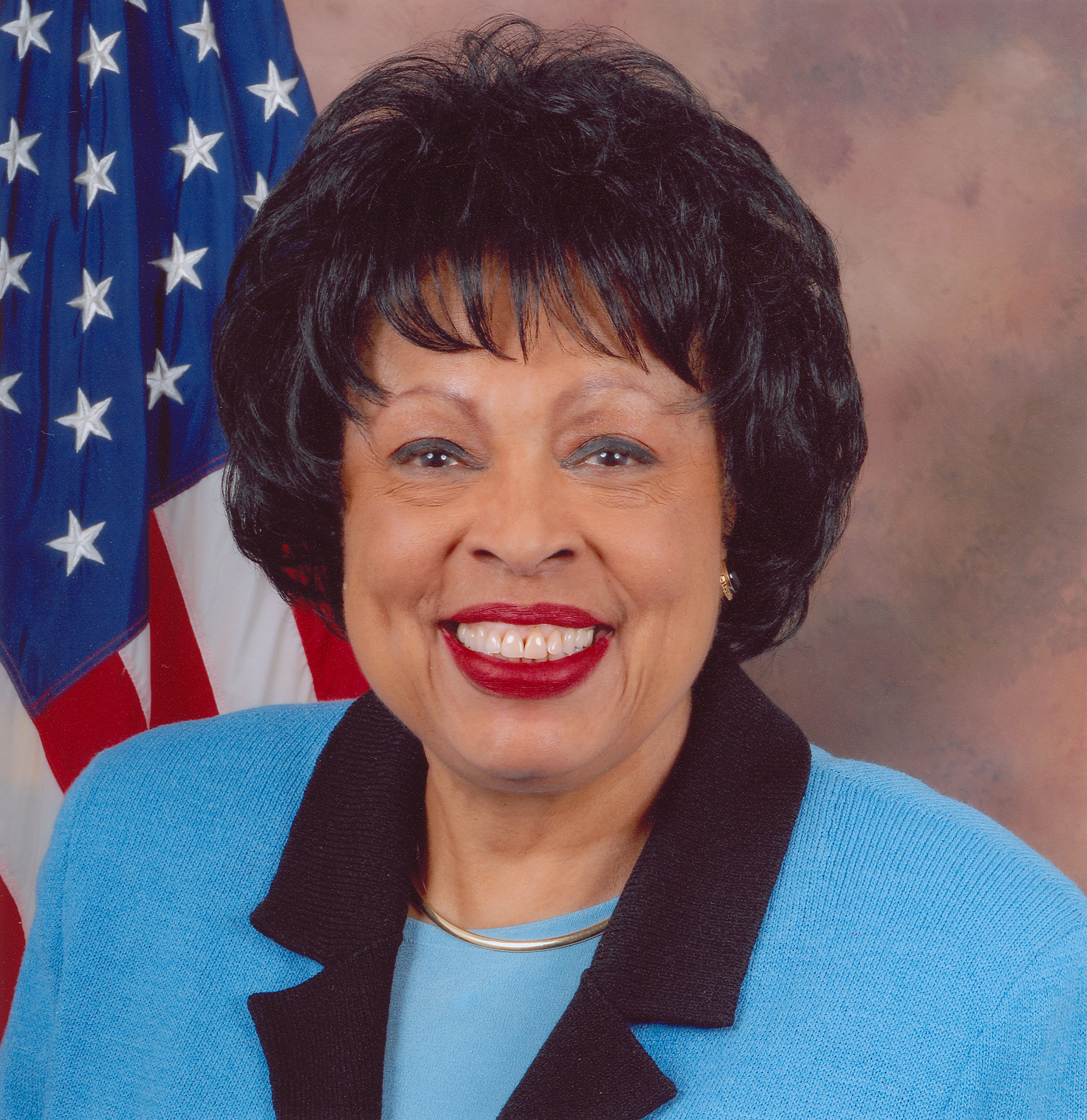

| Nominee | Diane Watson | Andrew Kim |
| Party | Democratic | Republican |
| Popular vote | 97,779 | 16,699 |
| Percentage | 82.5% | 14.1% |
- County results Watson: 80–90%
U.S. Representative before election
Diane Watson
Democratic
Elected U.S. Representative
Diane Watson
Democratic

=== Predictions ===
| Source | Ranking | As of |
|---|---|---|
| Sabato's Crystal Ball | Safe D | November 4, 2002 |
| New York Times | Safe D | October 14, 2002 |

=== Results ===
California's 33rd congressional district election, 2002
| Party | Candidate | Votes | % |
|---|---|---|---|
| Democratic | Diane Watson (incumbent) | 97,779 | 82.55 |
| Republican | Andrew Kim | 16,699 | 14.10 |
| Libertarian | Charles Tate | 3,971 | 3.35 |
| Invalid or blank votes | | 7,726 | 6.12 |
| Total votes | | 126,175 | 100.00 |
| Turnout | | | |
| Democratic hold | | | |

== District 34 ==
2002 California's 34th congressional district election
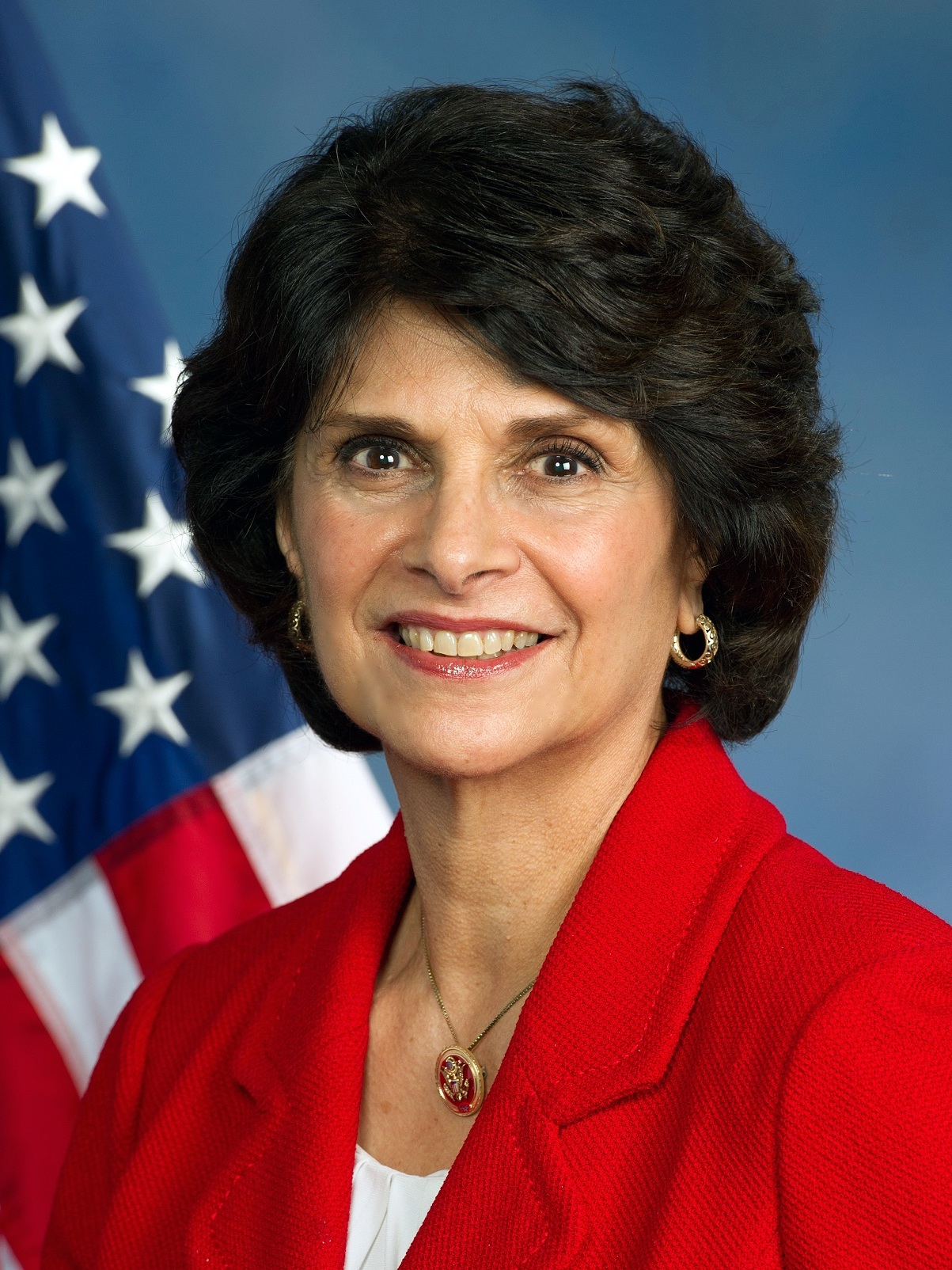

| Nominee | Lucille Roybal-Allard | Wayne Miller |
| Party | Democratic | Republican |
| Popular vote | 48,734 | 17,090 |
| Percentage | 74.0% | 26.0% |
- County results Roybal-Allard: 70–80%
U.S. Representative before election
Lucille Roybal-Allard
Democratic
Elected U.S. Representative
Lucille Roybal-Allard
Democratic

=== Predictions ===
| Source | Ranking | As of |
|---|---|---|
| Sabato's Crystal Ball | Safe D | November 4, 2002 |
| New York Times | Safe D | October 14, 2002 |

=== Results ===
California's 34th congressional district election, 2002
| Party | Candidate | Votes | % |
|---|---|---|---|
| Democratic | Lucille Roybal-Allard (incumbent) | 48,734 | 74.04 |
| Republican | Wayne Miller | 17,090 | 25.96 |
| Invalid or blank votes | | 5,663 | 7.92 |
| Total votes | | 71,487 | 100.00 |
| Turnout | | | |
| Democratic hold | | | |

== District 35 ==
2002 California's 35th congressional district election
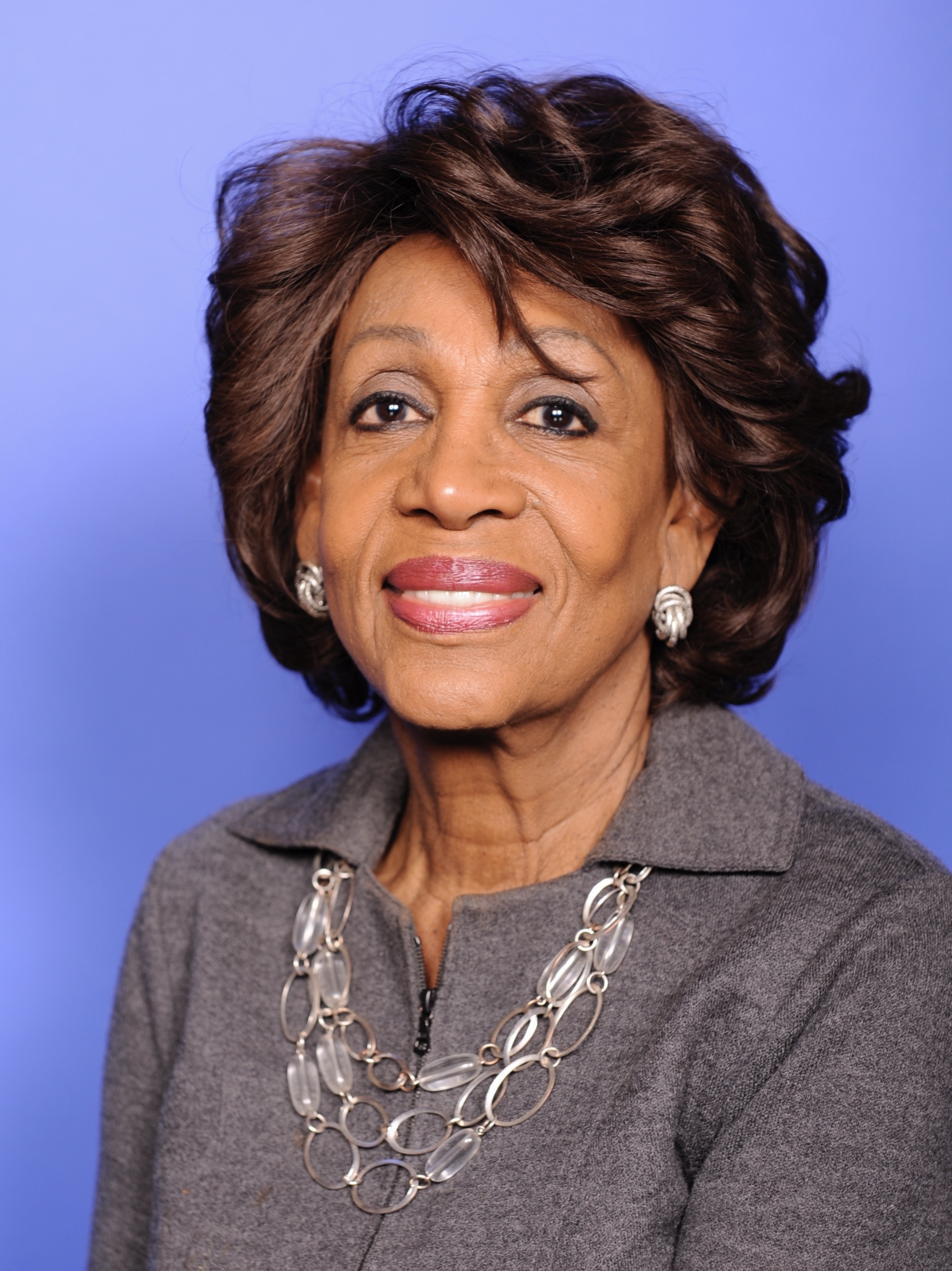

| Nominee | Maxine Waters | Ross Moen |
| Party | Democratic | Republican |
| Popular vote | 72,401 | 18,094 |
| Percentage | 77.5% | 19.4% |
- County results Waters: 70–80%
U.S. Representative before election
Maxine Waters
Democratic
Elected U.S. Representative
Maxine Waters
Democratic

=== Predictions ===
| Source | Ranking | As of |
|---|---|---|
| Sabato's Crystal Ball | Safe D | November 4, 2002 |
| New York Times | Safe D | October 14, 2002 |

=== Results ===
California's 35th congressional district election, 2002
| Party | Candidate | Votes | % |
|---|---|---|---|
| Democratic | Maxine Waters (incumbent) | 72,401 | 77.51 |
| Republican | Ross Moen | 18,094 | 19.37 |
| American Independent | Gordon Michael Mego | 2,912 | 3.12 |
| Invalid or blank votes | | 5,724 | 5.77 |
| Total votes | | 99,131 | 100.00 |
| Turnout | | | |
| Democratic hold | | | |

== District 36 ==
2002 California's 36th congressional district election
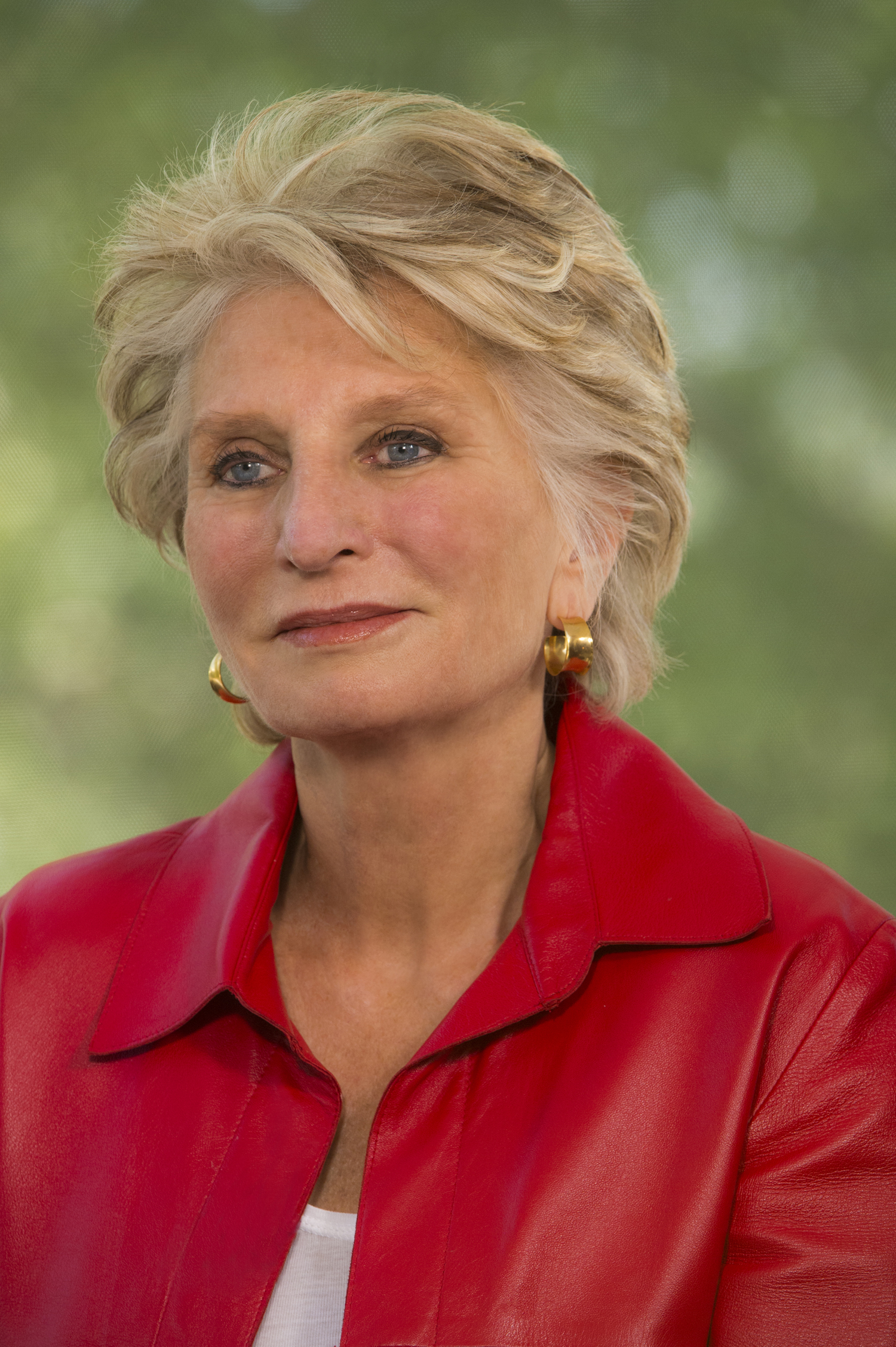

| Nominee | Jane Harman | Stuart Johnson |
| Party | Democratic | Republican |
| Popular vote | 88,198 | 50,328 |
| Percentage | 61.4% | 35.0% |
- County results Harman: 60–70%
U.S. Representative before election
Jane Harman
Democratic
Elected U.S. Representative
Jane Harman
Democratic

=== Predictions ===
| Source | Ranking | As of |
|---|---|---|
| Sabato's Crystal Ball | Safe D | November 4, 2002 |
| New York Times | Safe D | October 14, 2002 |

=== Results ===
California's 36th congressional district election, 2002
| Party | Candidate | Votes | % |
|---|---|---|---|
| Democratic | Jane Harman (incumbent) | 88,198 | 61.35 |
| Republican | Stuart Johnson | 50,328 | 35.01 |
| Libertarian | Mark McSpadden | 5,225 | 3.63 |
| Invalid or blank votes | | 7,647 | 5.05 |
| Total votes | | 151,398 | 100.00 |
| Turnout | | | |
| Democratic hold | | | |

== District 37 ==
2002 California's 37th congressional district election
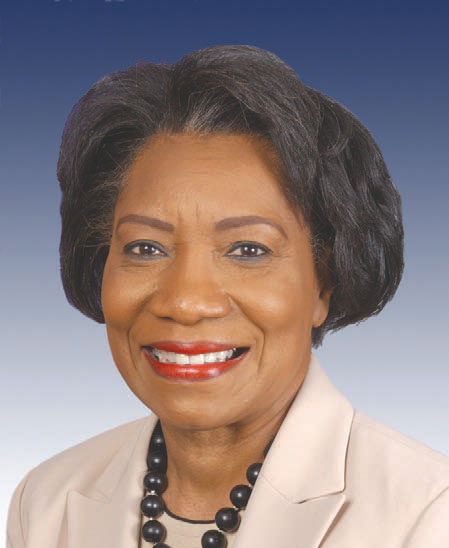

| Nominee | Juanita Millender-McDonald | Oscar A. Velasco |
| Party | Democratic | Republican |
| Popular vote | 63,445 | 20,154 |
| Percentage | 72.9% | 23.2% |
- County results Millender-Mcdonald: 70–80%
U.S. Representative before election
Juanita Millender-McDonald (inc.)
Democratic
Elected U.S. Representative
Juanita Millender-McDonald
Democratic

=== Predictions ===
| Source | Ranking | As of |
|---|---|---|
| Sabato's Crystal Ball | Safe D | November 4, 2002 |
| New York Times | Safe D | October 14, 2002 |

=== Results ===
California's 37th congressional district election, 2002
| Party | Candidate | Votes | % |
|---|---|---|---|
| Democratic | Juanita Millender-McDonald (inc.) | 63,445 | 72.92 |
| Republican | Oscar A. Velasco | 20,154 | 23.16 |
| Libertarian | Herb Peters | 3,413 | 3.92 |
| Invalid or blank votes | | 6,412 | 6.86 |
| Total votes | | 93,424 | 100.00 |
| Turnout | | | |
| Democratic hold | | | |

== District 38 ==
2002 California's 38th congressional district election
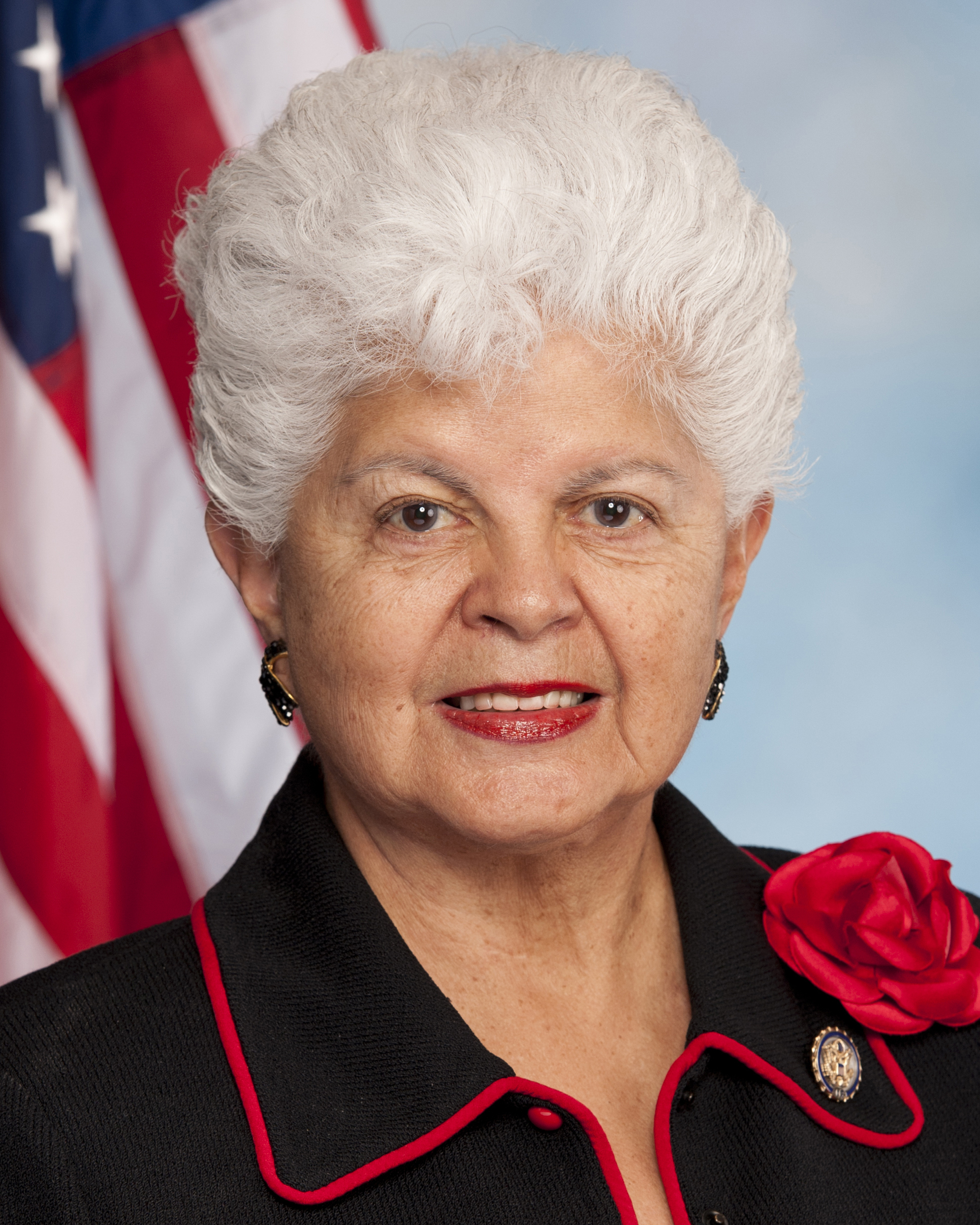

| Nominee | Grace Napolitano | Alex A. Burrola |
| Party | Democratic | Republican |
| Popular vote | 62,600 | 23,126 |
| Percentage | 71.1% | 26.3% |
- County results Napolitano: 70–80%
U.S. Representative before election
Grace Napolitano
Democratic
Elected U.S. Representative
Grace Napolitano
Democratic

=== Predictions ===
| Source | Ranking | As of |
|---|---|---|
| Sabato's Crystal Ball | Safe D | November 4, 2002 |
| New York Times | Safe D | October 14, 2002 |

=== Results ===
California's 38th congressional district election, 2002
| Party | Candidate | Votes | % |
|---|---|---|---|
| Democratic | Grace Napolitano (incumbent) | 62,600 | 71.11 |
| Republican | Alex A. Burrola | 23,126 | 26.27 |
| Libertarian | Al Cuperus | 2,301 | 2.61 |
| Invalid or blank votes | | 6,225 | 6.60 |
| Total votes | | 94,252 | 100.00 |
| Turnout | | | |
| Democratic hold | | | |

== District 39 ==
2002 California's 39th congressional district election
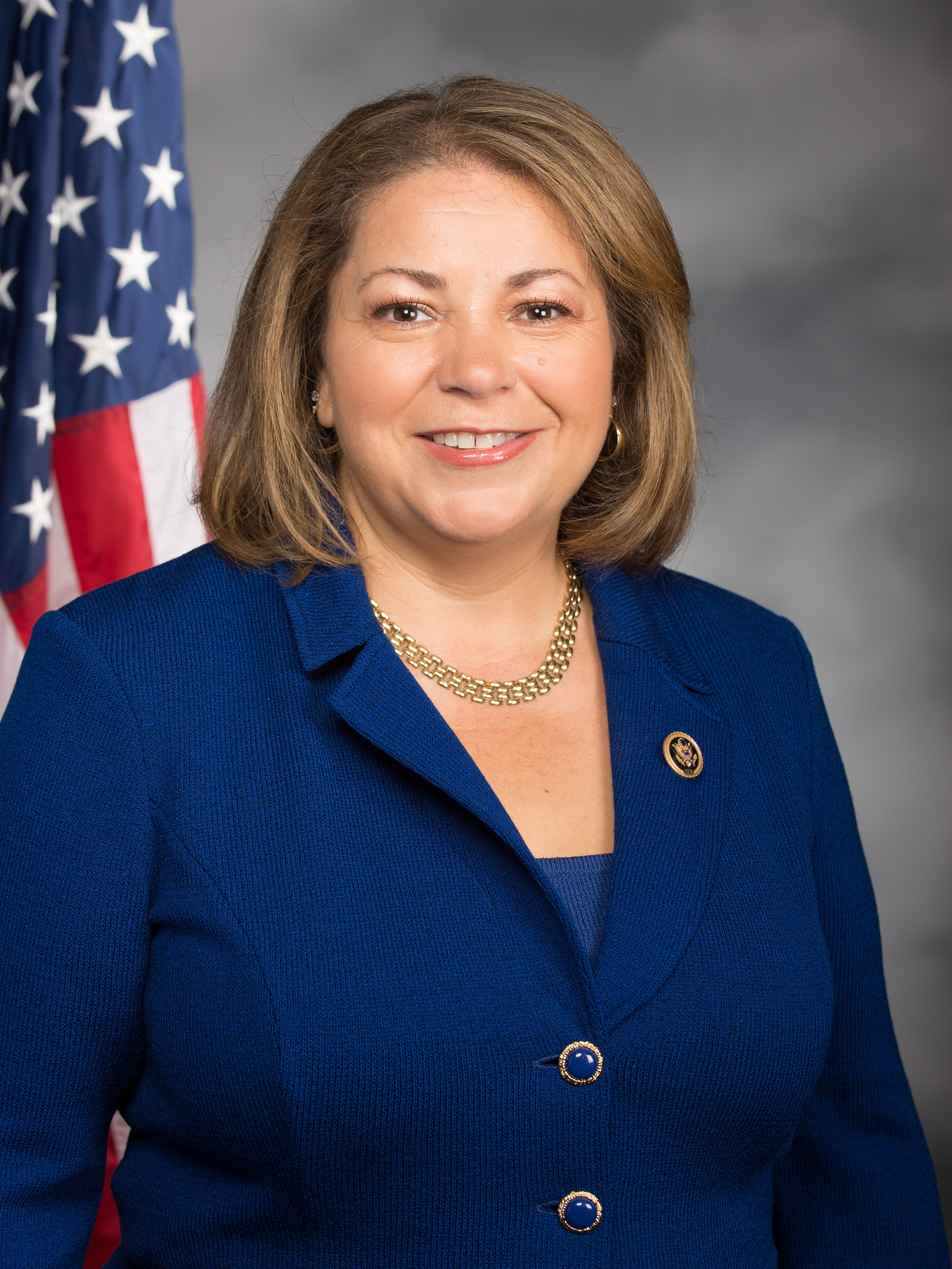

| Nominee | Linda Sánchez | Tim Escobar |
| Party | Democratic | Republican |
| Popular vote | 52,256 | 38,925 |
| Percentage | 54.8% | 40.8% |
- County results Sanchez: 50–60%
U.S. Representative before election
Ed Royce
Republican
Elected U.S. Representative
Linda Sánchez
Democratic

=== Predictions ===
| Source | Ranking | As of |
|---|---|---|
| Sabato's Crystal Ball | Safe D (flip) | November 4, 2002 |
| New York Times | Safe D (flip) | October 14, 2002 |

=== Results ===
California's 39th congressional district election, 2002
| Party | Candidate | Votes | % |
|---|---|---|---|
| Democratic | Linda Sánchez | 52,256 | 54.81 |
| Republican | Tim Escobar | 38,925 | 40.82 |
| Libertarian | Richard G. Newhouse | 4,165 | 4.37 |
| Invalid or blank votes | | 5,625 | 5.57 |
| Total votes | | 100,971 | 100.00 |
| Turnout | | | |
| Democratic gain from Republican | | | |

== District 40 ==
2002 California's 40th congressional district election
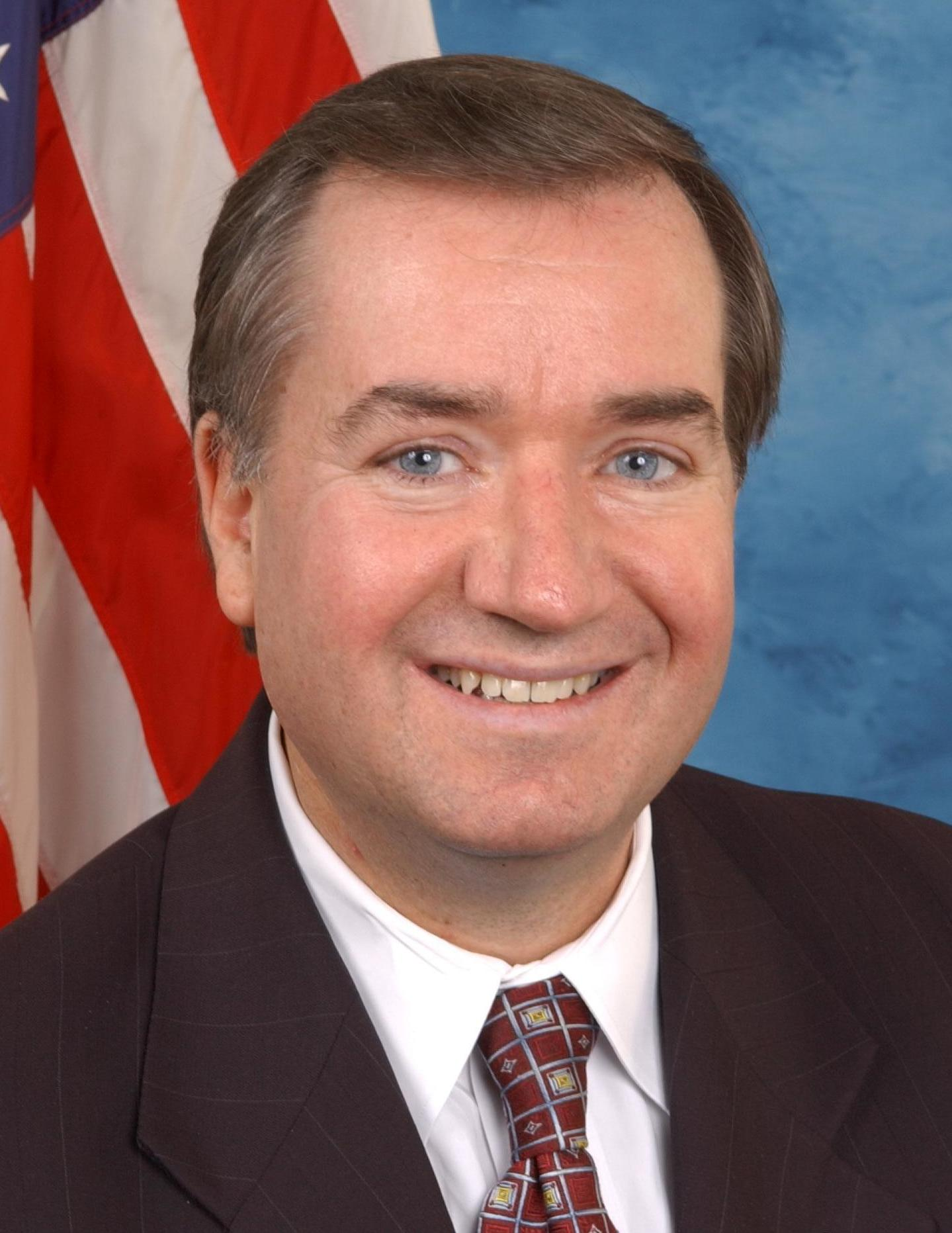

| Nominee | Ed Royce | Christina Avalos |
| Party | Republican | Democratic |
| Popular vote | 92,422 | 40,265 |
| Percentage | 67.6% | 29.5% |
- County results Royce: 60–70%
U.S. Representative before election
Ed Royce
Republican
Elected U.S. Representative
Ed Royce
Republican

=== Predictions ===
| Source | Ranking | As of |
|---|---|---|
| Sabato's Crystal Ball | Safe R | November 4, 2002 |
| New York Times | Safe R | October 14, 2002 |

=== Results ===
California's 40th congressional district election, 2002
| Party | Candidate | Votes | % |
|---|---|---|---|
| Republican | Ed Royce (incumbent) | 92,422 | 67.64 |
| Democratic | Christina Avalos | 40,265 | 29.47 |
| Libertarian | Charles R. "Chuck" McGlawn | 3,955 | 2.89 |
| Invalid or blank votes | | 0 | 0.00 |
| Total votes | | 136,642 | 100.00 |
| Turnout | | | |
| Republican hold | | | |

== District 41 ==
2002 California's 41st congressional district election
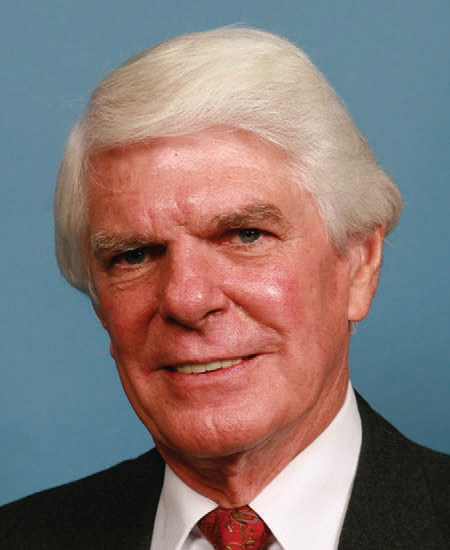

| Nominee | Jerry Lewis | Keith A. Johnson |
| Party | Republican | Democratic |
| Popular vote | 91,326 | 40,155 |
| Percentage | 67.4% | 29.6% |
- County results Lewis: 50–60% 60–70%
U.S. Representative before election
Jerry Lewis
Republican
Elected U.S. Representative
Jerry Lewis
Republican

=== Predictions ===
| Source | Ranking | As of |
|---|---|---|
| Sabato's Crystal Ball | Safe R | November 4, 2002 |
| New York Times | Safe R | October 14, 2002 |

=== Results ===
California's 41st congressional district election, 2002
| Party | Candidate | Votes | % |
|---|---|---|---|
| Republican | Jerry Lewis (incumbent) | 91,326 | 67.38 |
| Democratic | Keith A. Johnson | 40,155 | 29.63 |
| Libertarian | Kevin Craig | 4,052 | 2.99 |
| Invalid or blank votes | | 8,214 | 5.71 |
| Total votes | | 143,747 | 100.00 |
| Turnout | | | |
| Republican hold | | | |

== District 42 ==
2002 California's 42nd congressional district election
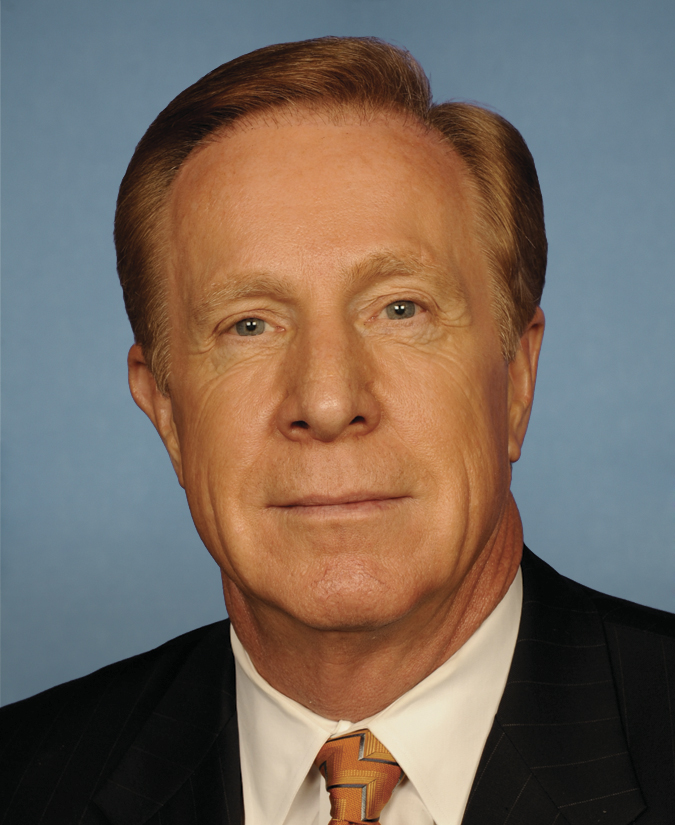

| Nominee | Gary Miller | Richard Waldron |
| Party | Republican | Democratic |
| Popular vote | 98,476 | 42,090 |
| Percentage | 67.8% | 29.0% |
- County results Miller: 60–70% 70–80%
U.S. Representative before election
Gary Miller
Republican
Elected U.S. Representative
Gary Miller
Republican

=== Predictions ===
| Source | Ranking | As of |
|---|---|---|
| Sabato's Crystal Ball | Safe R | November 4, 2002 |
| New York Times | Safe R | October 14, 2002 |

=== Results ===
California's 42nd congressional district election, 2002
| Party | Candidate | Votes | % |
|---|---|---|---|
| Republican | Gary Miller (incumbent) | 98,476 | 67.80 |
| Democratic | Richard Waldron | 42,090 | 28.98 |
| Libertarian | Donald Yee | 4,680 | 3.22 |
| Invalid or blank votes | | 3,507 | 2.36 |
| Total votes | | 148,753 | 100.00 |
| Turnout | | | |
| Republican hold | | | |

== District 43 ==
2002 California's 43rd congressional district election
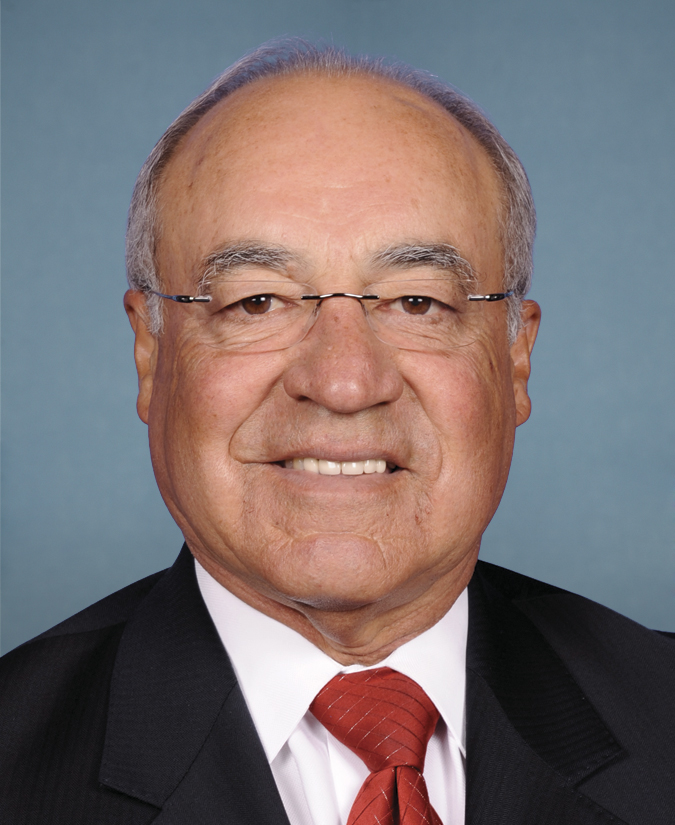

| Nominee | Joe Baca | Wendy C. Neighbor |
| Party | Democratic | Republican |
| Popular vote | 45,374 | 20,821 |
| Percentage | 66.4% | 30.5% |
- County results Baca: 60–70%
U.S. Representative before election
Joe Baca
Democratic
Elected U.S. Representative
Joe Baca
Democratic

=== Predictions ===
| Source | Ranking | As of |
|---|---|---|
| Sabato's Crystal Ball | Safe D | November 4, 2002 |
| New York Times | Safe D | October 14, 2002 |

=== Results ===
California's 43rd congressional district election, 2002
| Party | Candidate | Votes | % |
|---|---|---|---|
| Democratic | Joe Baca | 45,374 | 66.39 |
| Republican | Wendy C. Neighbor | 20,821 | 30.47 |
| Libertarian | Ethel M. Mohler | 2,145 | 3.14 |
| Invalid or blank votes | | 5,273 | 7.16 |
| Total votes | | 73,613 | 100.00 |
| Turnout | | | |
| Democratic win (new seat) | | | |

== District 44 ==
2002 California's 44th congressional district election
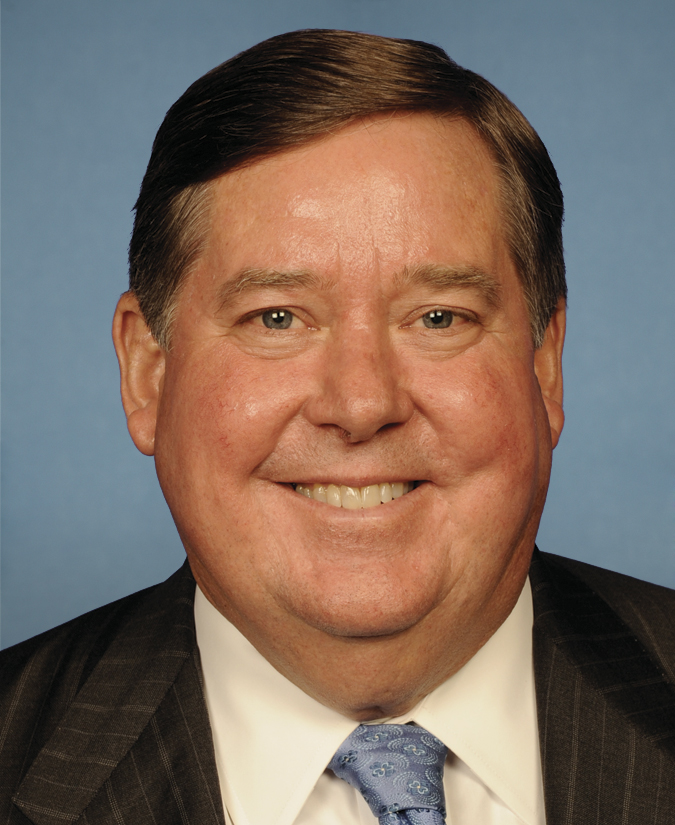

| Nominee | Ken Calvert | Louis Vandenberg |
| Party | Republican | Democratic |
| Popular vote | 76,686 | 38,021 |
| Percentage | 63.7% | 31.6% |
- County results Calvert: 60–70% 70–80%
U.S. Representative before election
Ken Calvert
Republican
Elected U.S. Representative
Ken Calvert
Republican

=== Predictions ===
| Source | Ranking | As of |
|---|---|---|
| Sabato's Crystal Ball | Safe R | November 4, 2002 |
| New York Times | Safe R | October 14, 2002 |

=== Results ===
California's 44th congressional district election, 2002
| Party | Candidate | Votes | % |
|---|---|---|---|
| Republican | Ken Calvert (incumbent) | 76,686 | 63.66 |
| Democratic | Louis Vandenberg | 38,021 | 31.56 |
| Green | Phillip Courtney | 5,756 | 4.78 |
| Invalid or blank votes | | 0 | 0.00 |
| Total votes | | 120,463 | 100.00 |
| Turnout | | | |
| Republican hold | | | |

== District 45 ==
2002 California's 45th congressional district election
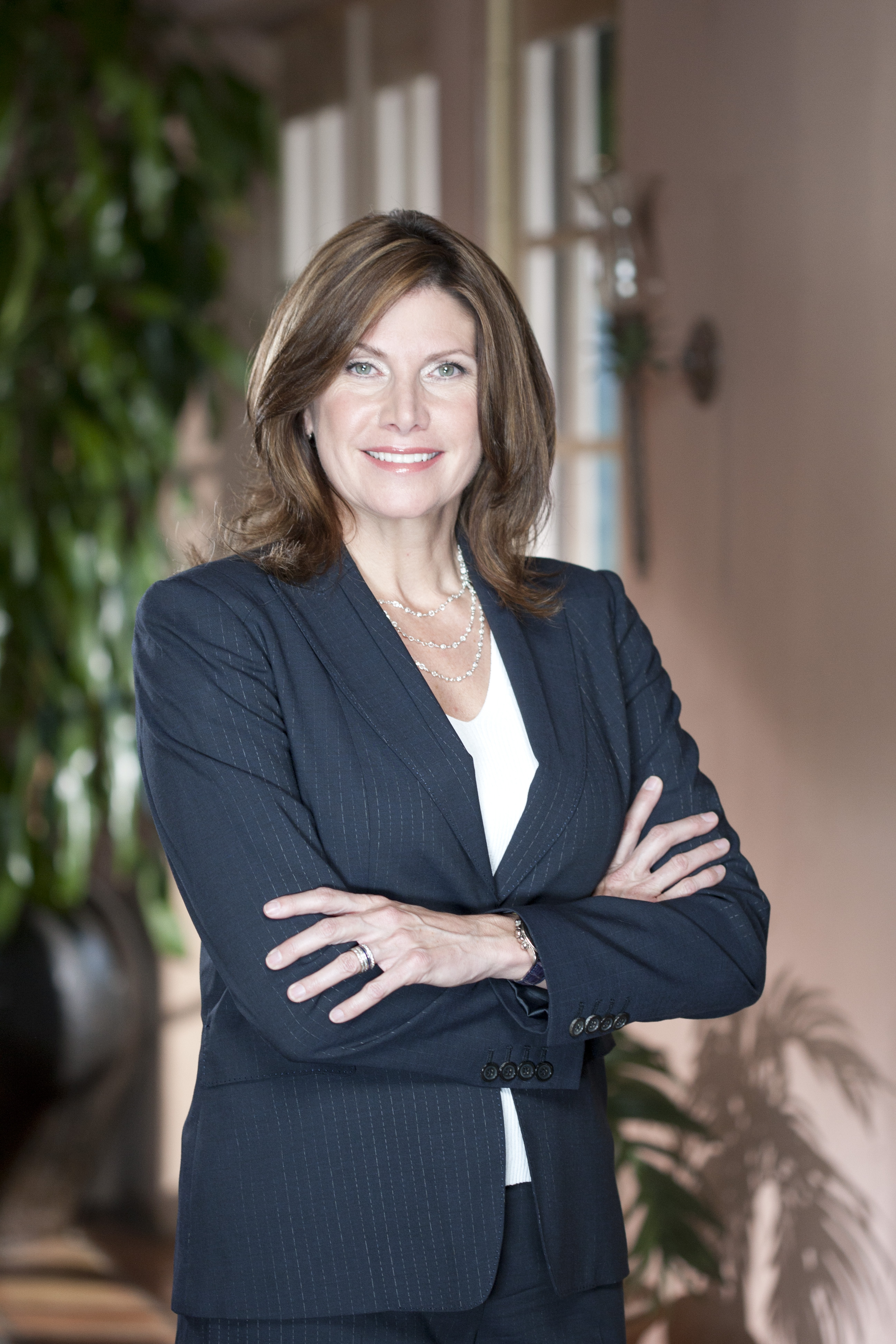

| Nominee | Mary Bono | Elle K. Kurpiewski |
| Party | Republican | Democratic |
| Popular vote | 87,101 | 43,692 |
| Percentage | 65.2% | 32.7% |
- County results Bono: 60–70%
U.S. Representative before election
Mary Bono
Republican
Elected U.S. Representative
Mary Bono
Republican

=== Predictions ===
| Source | Ranking | As of |
|---|---|---|
| Sabato's Crystal Ball | Safe R | November 4, 2002 |
| New York Times | Safe R | October 14, 2002 |

=== Results ===
California's 45th congressional district election, 2002
| Party | Candidate | Votes | % |
|---|---|---|---|
| Republican | Mary Bono (incumbent) | 87,101 | 65.23 |
| Democratic | Elle K. Kurpiewski | 43,692 | 32.72 |
| Libertarian | Rod Miller-Boyer | 2,740 | 2.05 |
| Invalid or blank votes | | 0 | 0.00 |
| Total votes | | 133,533 | 100.00 |
| Turnout | | | |
| Republican hold | | | |

== District 46 ==
2002 California's 46th congressional district election
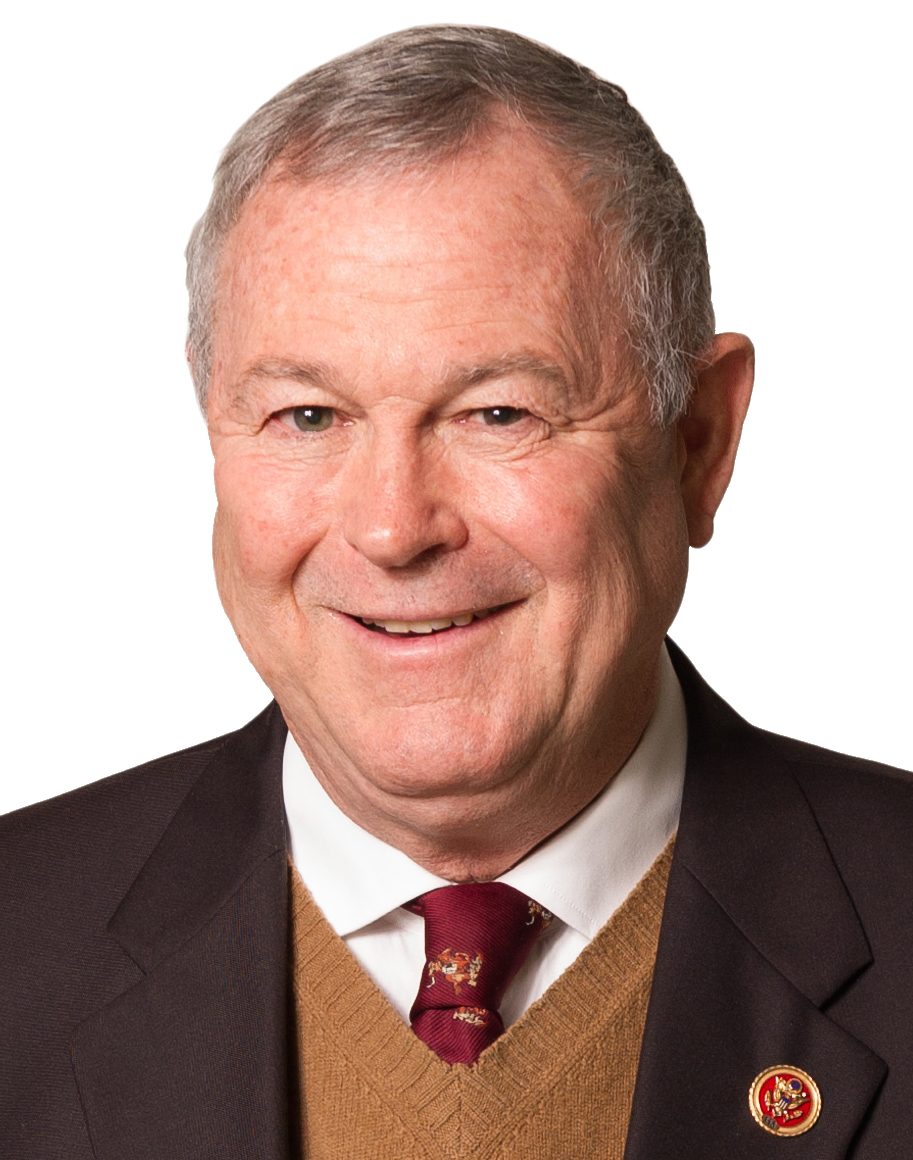

| Nominee | Dana Rohrabacher | Gerrie Schipske |
| Party | Republican | Democratic |
| Popular vote | 108,807 | 60,890 |
| Percentage | 61.7% | 34.5% |
- County results Rohrabacher: 50–60% 60–70%
U.S. Representative before election
Dana Rohrabacher
Republican
Elected U.S. Representative
Dana Rohrabacher
Republican

=== Predictions ===
| Source | Ranking | As of |
|---|---|---|
| Sabato's Crystal Ball | Safe R | November 4, 2002 |
| New York Times | Safe R | October 14, 2002 |

=== Results ===
California's 46th congressional district election, 2002
| Party | Candidate | Votes | % |
|---|---|---|---|
| Republican | Dana Rohrabacher (incumbent) | 108,807 | 61.73 |
| Democratic | Gerrie Schipske | 60,890 | 34.54 |
| Libertarian | Keith Gann | 6,488 | 3.68 |
| No party | Thomas Lash (write-in) | 80 | 0.05 |
| Invalid or blank votes | | 3,310 | 1.84 |
| Total votes | | 179,575 | 100.00 |
| Turnout | | | |
| Republican hold | | | |

== District 47 ==
2002 California's 47th congressional district election
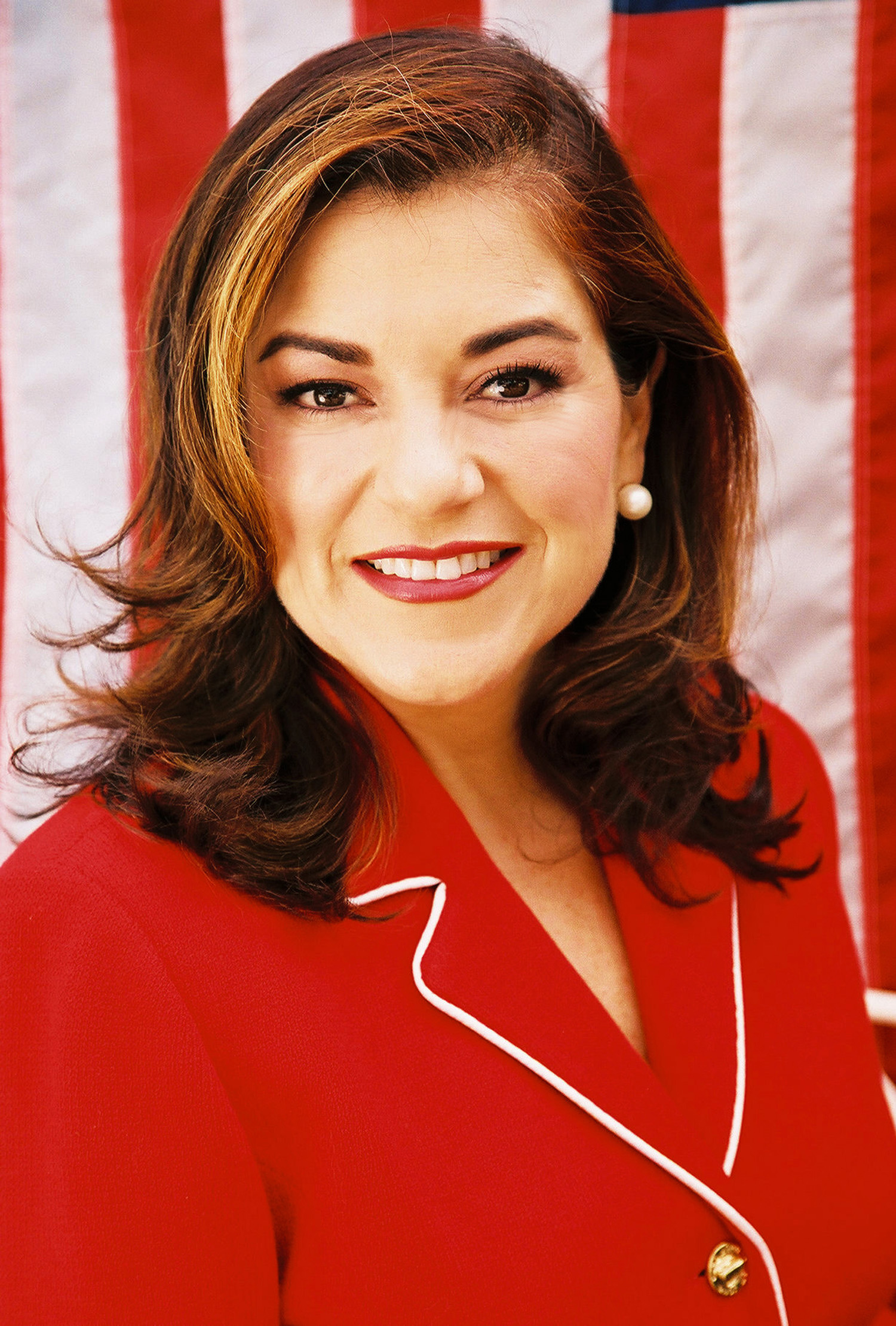

| Nominee | Loretta Sanchez | Jeff Chavez |
| Party | Democratic | Republican |
| Popular vote | 42,501 | 24,346 |
| Percentage | 60.6% | 34.7% |
- County results Sanchez: 60–70%
U.S. Representative before election
Loretta Sanchez
Democratic
Elected U.S. Representative
Loretta Sanchez
Democratic

=== Predictions ===
| Source | Ranking | As of |
|---|---|---|
| Sabato's Crystal Ball | Safe D | November 4, 2002 |
| New York Times | Safe D | October 14, 2002 |

=== Results ===
California's 47th congressional district election, 2002
| Party | Candidate | Votes | % |
|---|---|---|---|
| Democratic | Loretta Sanchez (incumbent) | 42,501 | 60.56 |
| Republican | Jeff Chavez | 24,346 | 34.69 |
| Libertarian | Paul Marsden | 2,944 | 4.20 |
| No party | Kenneth Valenzuela Fisher (write-in) | 382 | 0.54 |
| No party | Michael J. Monge (write-in) | 5 | 0.01 |
| Invalid or blank votes | | 0 | 0.00 |
| Total votes | | 70,178 | 100.00 |
| Turnout | | | |
| Democratic hold | | | |

== District 48 ==
2002 California's 48th congressional district election
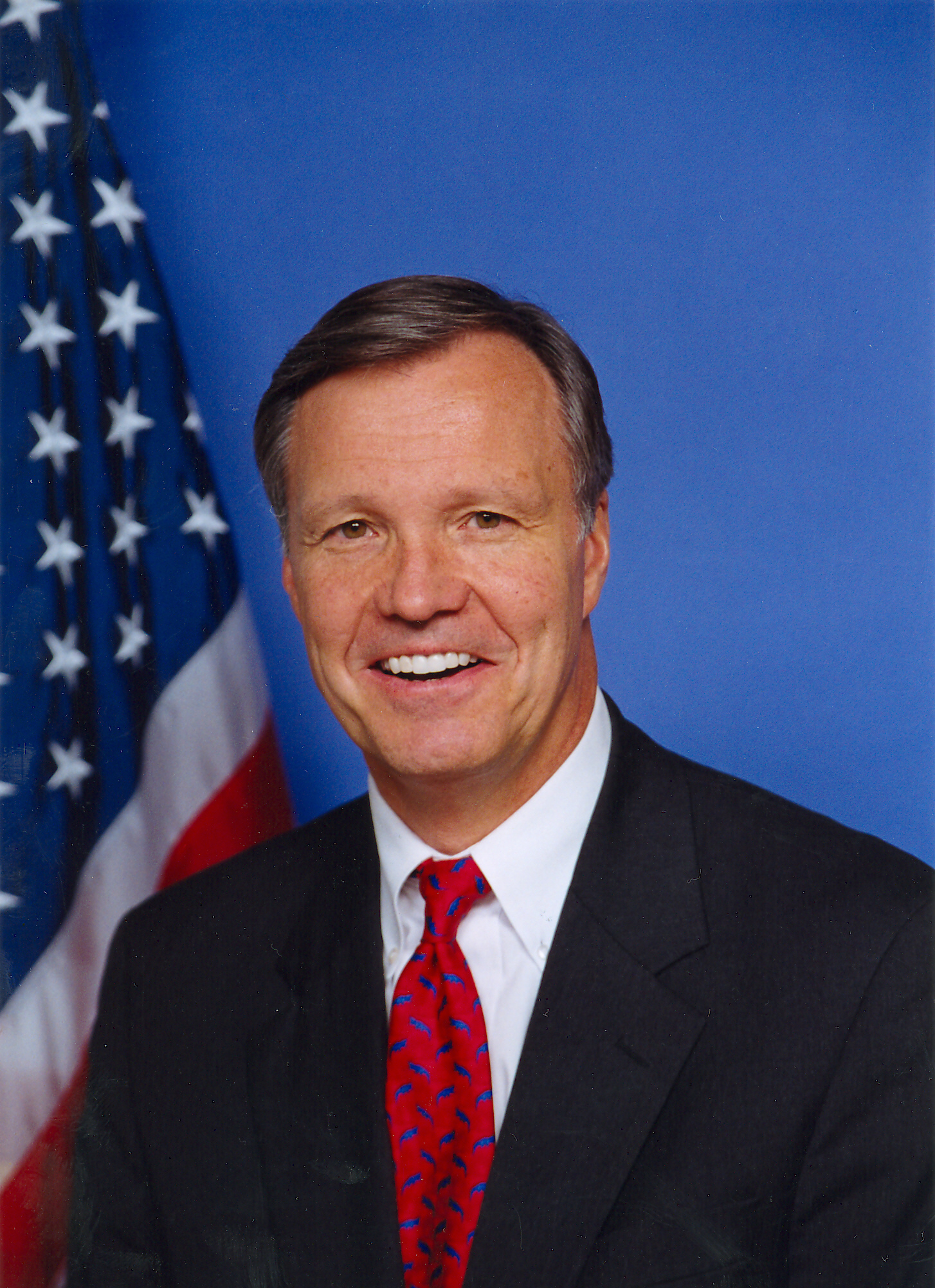

| Nominee | Christopher Cox | John Graham |
| Party | Republican | Democratic |
| Popular vote | 122,884 | 51,058 |
| Percentage | 68.4% | 28.4% |
- County results Cox: 60–70%
U.S. Representative before election
Christopher Cox
Republican
Elected U.S. Representative
Christopher Cox
Republican

=== Predictions ===
| Source | Ranking | As of |
|---|---|---|
| Sabato's Crystal Ball | Safe R | November 4, 2002 |
| New York Times | Safe R | October 14, 2002 |

=== Results ===
California's 48th congressional district election, 2002
| Party | Candidate | Votes | % |
|---|---|---|---|
| Republican | Christopher Cox (incumbent) | 122,884 | 68.44 |
| Democratic | John Graham | 51,058 | 28.44 |
| Libertarian | Joe Michael Cobb | 5,607 | 3.12 |
| Invalid or blank votes | | 0 | 0.00 |
| Total votes | | 179,549 | 100.00 |
| Turnout | | | |
| Republican hold | | | |

== District 49 ==
2002 California's 49th congressional district election
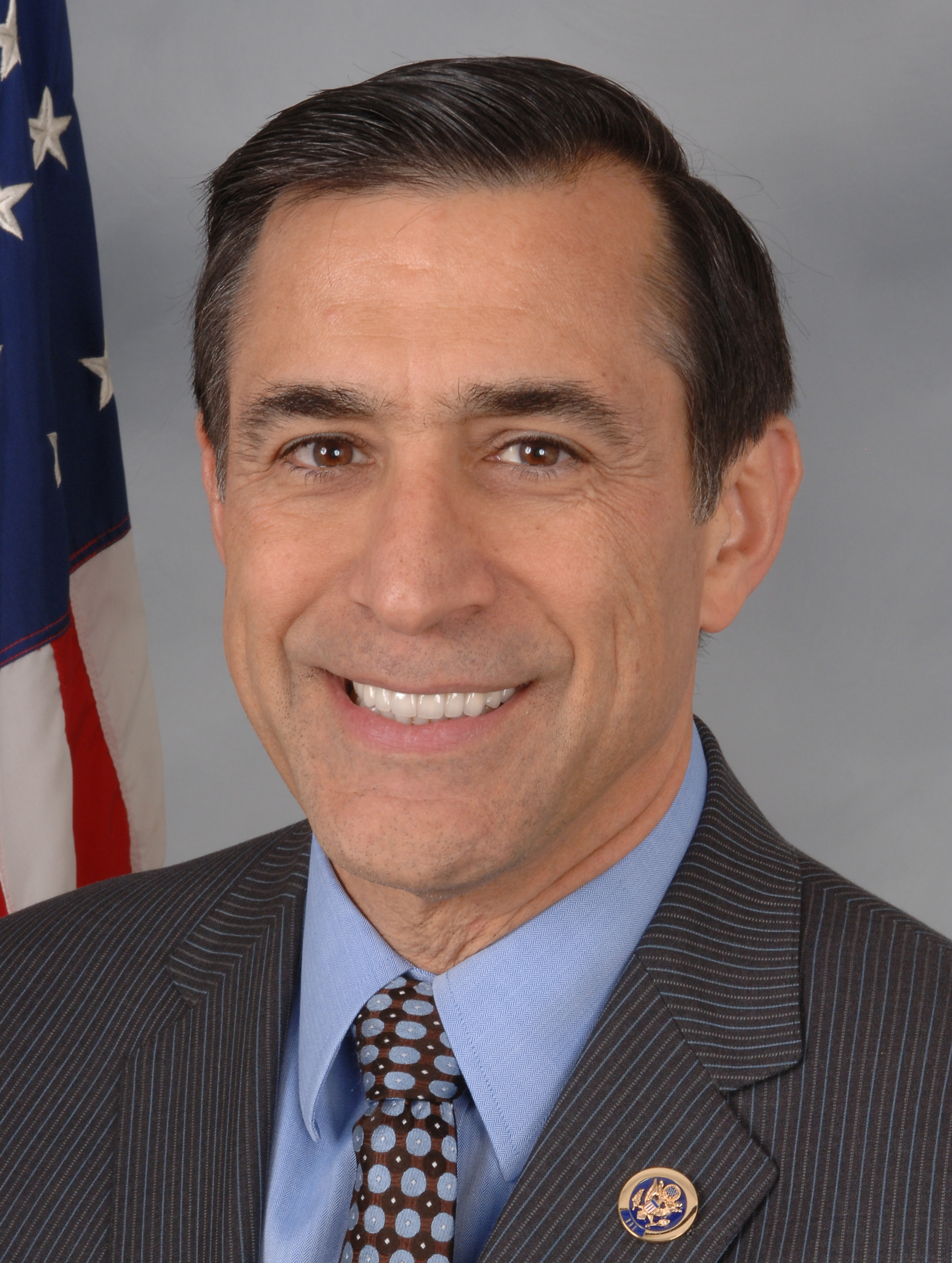

| Nominee | Darrell Issa | Karl W. Dietrich |
| Party | Republican | Libertarian |
| Popular vote | 94,594 | 26,891 |
| Percentage | 77.2% | 21.9% |
- County results Issa: 70–80%
U.S. Representative before election
Darrell Issa
Republican
Elected U.S. Representative
Darrell Issa
Republican

=== Predictions ===
| Source | Ranking | As of |
|---|---|---|
| Sabato's Crystal Ball | Safe R | November 4, 2002 |
| New York Times | Safe R | October 14, 2002 |

=== Results ===
California's 49th congressional district election, 2002
| Party | Candidate | Votes | % |
|---|---|---|---|
| Republican | Darrell Issa (incumbent) | 94,594 | 77.22 |
| Libertarian | Karl W. Dietrich | 26,891 | 21.95 |
| No party | Michael P. Byron (write-in) | 1,012 | 0.83 |
| Invalid or blank votes | | 13,345 | 9.82 |
| Total votes | | 135,842 | 100.00 |
| Turnout | | | |
| Republican hold | | | |

== District 50 ==
2002 California's 50th congressional district election
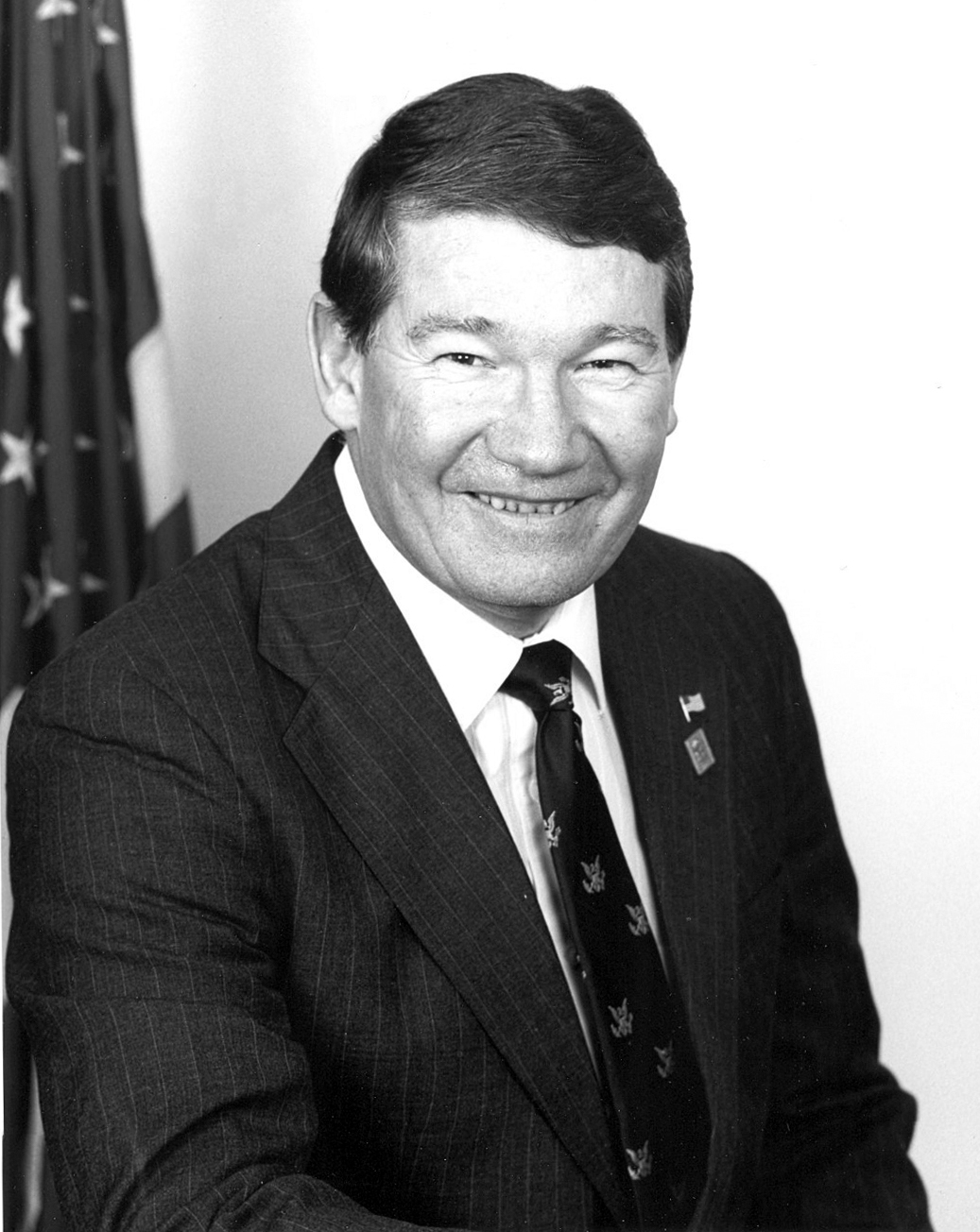

| Nominee | Duke Cunningham | Del G. Stewart |
| Party | Republican | Democratic |
| Popular vote | 111,095 | 55,855 |
| Percentage | 64.3% | 32.3% |
- County results Cunningham: 60–70%
U.S. Representative before election
Duke Cunningham
Republican
Elected U.S. Representative
Duke Cunningham
Republican

=== Predictions ===
| Source | Ranking | As of |
|---|---|---|
| Sabato's Crystal Ball | Safe R | November 4, 2002 |
| New York Times | Safe R | October 14, 2002 |

=== Results ===
California's 50th congressional district election, 2002
| Party | Candidate | Votes | % |
|---|---|---|---|
| Republican | Duke Cunningham (incumbent) | 111,095 | 64.33 |
| Democratic | Del G. Stewart | 55,855 | 32.34 |
| Libertarian | Richard M. Fontanesi | 5,751 | 3.33 |
| Invalid or blank votes | | 14,568 | 7.78 |
| Total votes | | 187,269 | 100.00 |
| Turnout | | | |
| Republican hold | | | |

== District 51 ==
2002 California's 51st congressional district election
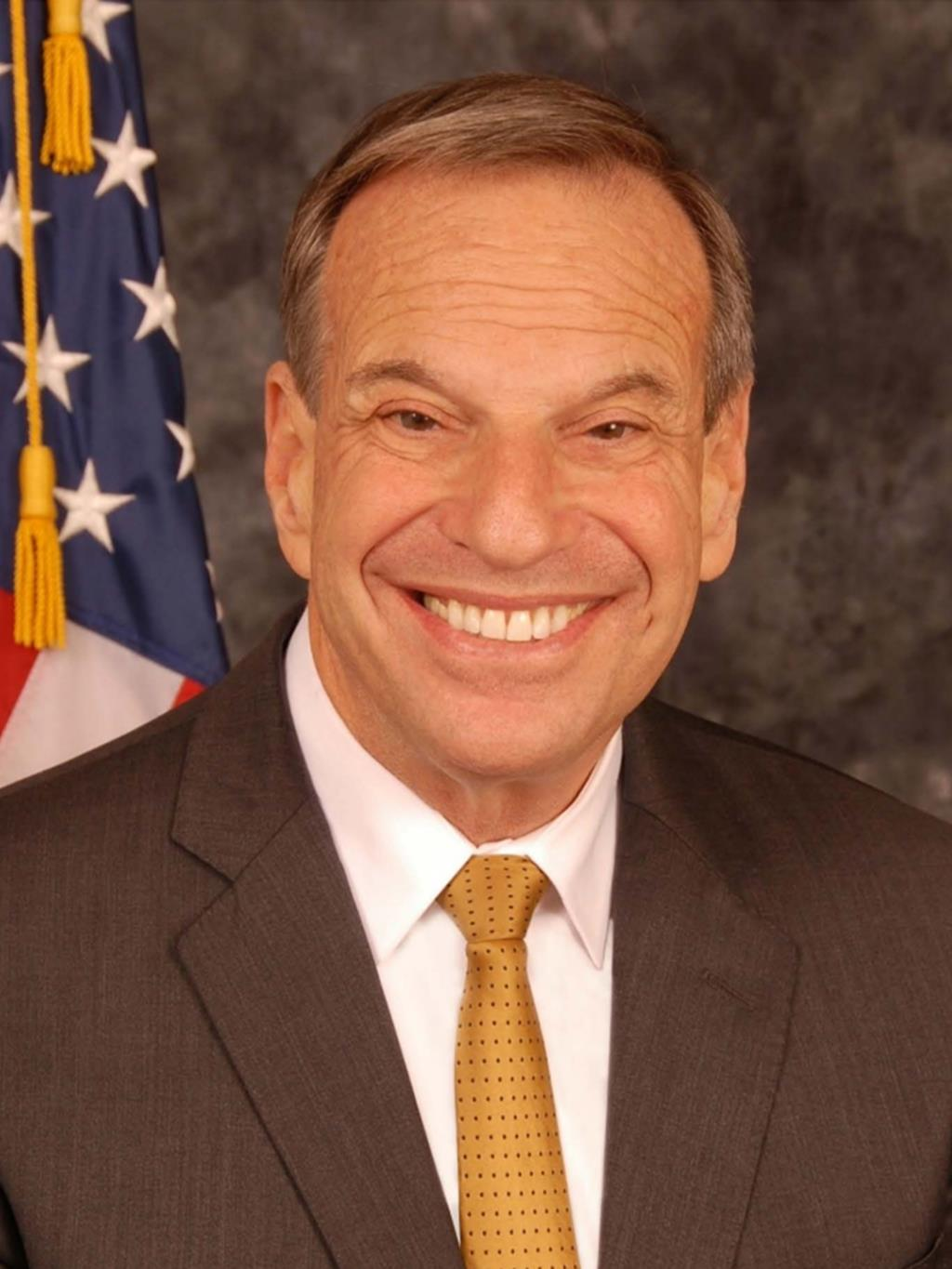

| Nominee | Bob Filner | Maria Guadalupe Garcia |
| Party | Democratic | Republican |
| Popular vote | 59,541 | 40,430 |
| Percentage | 57.9% | 39.3% |
- County results Filner: 50–60%
U.S. Representative before election
Bob Filner
Democratic
Elected U.S. Representative
Bob Filner
Democratic

=== Predictions ===
| Source | Ranking | As of |
|---|---|---|
| Sabato's Crystal Ball | Safe D | November 4, 2002 |
| New York Times | Safe D | October 14, 2002 |

=== Results ===
California's 51st congressional district election, 2002
| Party | Candidate | Votes | % |
|---|---|---|---|
| Democratic | Bob Filner (incumbent) | 59,541 | 57.93 |
| Republican | Maria Guadalupe Garcia | 40,430 | 39.33 |
| Libertarian | Jeffrey S. Keup | 2,816 | 2.74 |
| Invalid or blank votes | | 7,763 | 7.02 |
| Total votes | | 110,549 | 100.00 |
| Turnout | | | |
| Democratic hold | | | |

== District 52 ==
2002 California's 52nd congressional district election
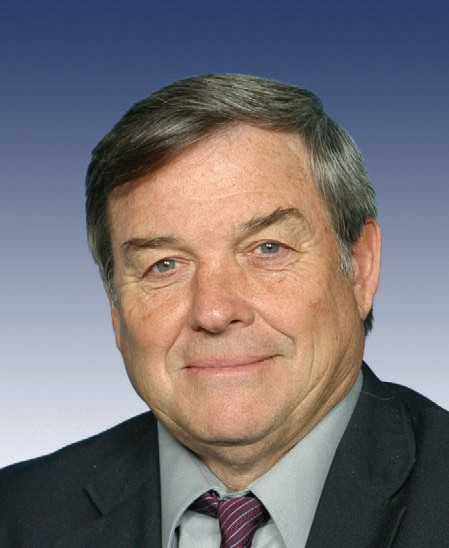

| Nominee | Duncan Hunter | Peter Moore-Kochlacs |
| Party | Republican | Democratic |
| Popular vote | 118,561 | 43,526 |
| Percentage | 70.2% | 25.8% |
- County results Hunter: 70–80%
U.S. Representative before election
Duncan Hunter
Republican
Elected U.S. Representative
Duncan Hunter
Republican

=== Predictions ===
| Source | Ranking | As of |
|---|---|---|
| Sabato's Crystal Ball | Safe R | November 4, 2002 |
| New York Times | Safe R | October 14, 2002 |

=== Results ===
California's 52nd congressional district election, 2002
| Party | Candidate | Votes | % |
|---|---|---|---|
| Republican | Duncan Hunter (incumbent) | 118,561 | 70.15 |
| Democratic | Peter Moore-Kochlacs | 43,526 | 25.75 |
| Libertarian | Michael Benoit | 6,923 | 4.10 |
| Invalid or blank votes | | 12,916 | 7.10 |
| Total votes | | 181,926 | 100.00 |
| Turnout | | | |
| Republican hold | | | |

== District 53 ==
2002 California's 53rd congressional district election
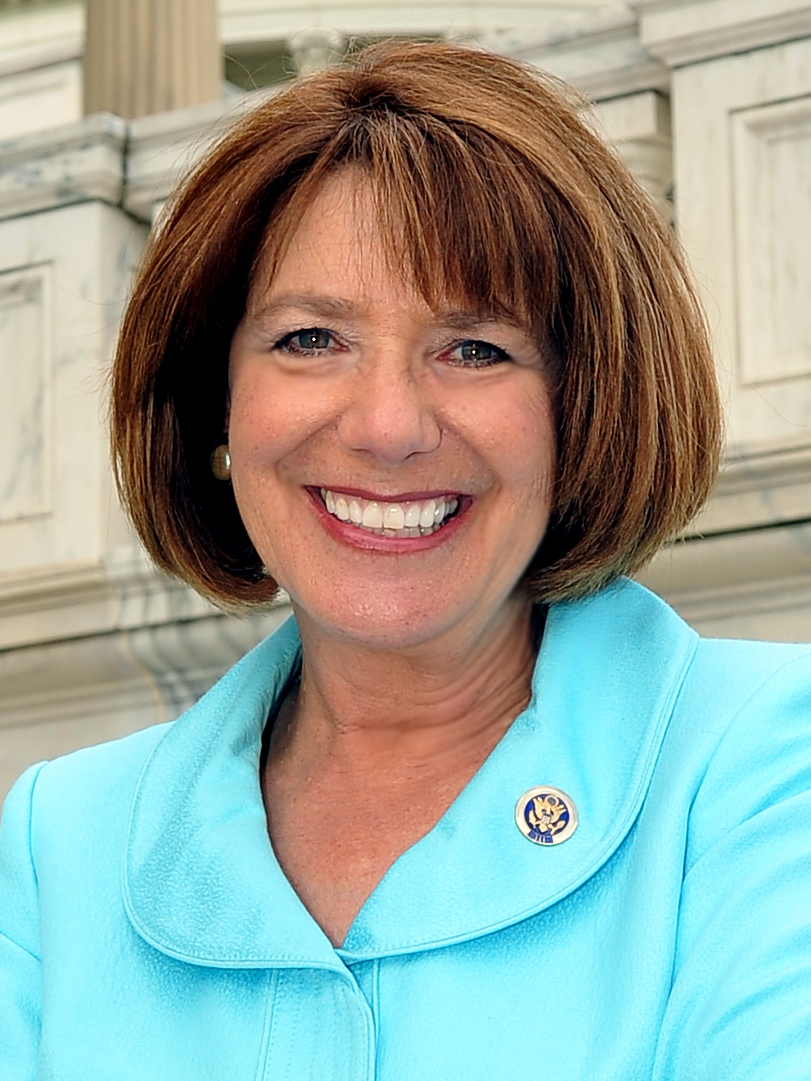

| Nominee | Susan Davis | Bill VanDeWeghe |
| Party | Democratic | Republican |
| Popular vote | 72,252 | 43,891 |
| Percentage | 62.2% | 37.8% |
- County results Davis: 60–70%
U.S. Representative before election
Susan Davis
Democratic
Elected U.S. Representative
Susan Davis
Democratic

=== Predictions ===
| Source | Ranking | As of |
|---|---|---|
| Sabato's Crystal Ball | Safe D | November 4, 2002 |
| New York Times | Safe D | October 14, 2002 |

=== Results ===
California's 53rd congressional district election, 2002
| Party | Candidate | Votes | % |
|---|---|---|---|
| Democratic | Susan Davis (incumbent) | 72,252 | 62.19 |
| Republican | Bill VanDeWeghe | 43,891 | 37.78 |
| No party | Jim Dorenkott (write-in) | 37 | 0.03 |
| Invalid or blank votes | | 17,166 | 12.87 |
| Total votes | | 133,346 | 100.00 |
| Turnout | | | |
| Democratic hold | | | |

== See also ==
- 108th United States Congress
- Political party strength in California
- Political party strength in U.S. states
