= Curran v. Mount Diablo Council of the Boy Scouts of America =

US legal case

- Supreme Court of California

Decided March 23, 1998
- Full case name: Timothy Curran v. Mount Diablo Council of the Boy Scouts of America
- Citation(s): 17 Cal.4th 670, 952 P.2d 218, 72 Cal.Rptr.2d 410 (1998)

Case history
- Prior history: Judgment affirmed, 147 Cal.App.3d 712, 195 Cal. Rptr. 325 (1983)

Holding
- The Boy Scouts of America are not considered a "business establishment" and do not fall under the provisions of California's Unruh Civil Rights Act. Decision of the Court of Appeal is affirmed.

Court membership
- Chief Justice: Ronald M. George
- Associate Justices: Stanley Mosk, Joyce L. Kennard, Marvin R. Baxter, Kathryn Werdegar, Ming Chin, Janice Rogers Brown

Case opinions
- Majority: George, joined by Kennard, Baxter, Chin
- Concurrence: Mosk
- Concurrence: Kennard
- Concurrence: Werdegar
- Concurrence: Brown

Laws applied
- Unruh Civil Rights Act (Cal. Civil Code § 51)

Curran v. Mount Diablo Council of the Boy Scouts of America, 17 Cal.4th 670, 952 P.2d 218, 72 Cal.Rptr.2d 410 (1998), was a landmark case which upheld the right of a private organization in California to not allow new members on the basis of their sexual orientation. Its companion case was Randall v. Orange County Council, 17 Cal.4th 736, 952 P.2d 261, 72 Cal.Rptr.2d 453 (1998).

== Background ==
In 1980, eighteen-year-old Tim Curran, an Eagle Scout, applied to be an assistant Scoutmaster in the Mount Diablo Council Boy Scouts of America. Members of the Boy Scouts of America, however, had recently learned that Curran was gay after reading an Oakland Tribune article on gay youth which featured an interview with Curran. Based on his sexual orientation, the Boy Scouts of America refused to allow Curran to hold a leadership position in their organization.

Curran sued in 1981, alleging that the Boy Scouts of America's membership requirements amounted to unlawful discrimination under California's Unruh Civil Rights Act, which required "Full and equal accommodations, advantages, facilities, privileges or services in all business establishments".

== Decision ==
This case was ultimately decided in 1998, when the California Supreme Court ruled in favor of the Boy Scouts of America. The court held that because the Boy Scouts of America was not considered a "business establishment" under the Unruh Civil Rights Act, it could not be required to change its membership policies so as to include homosexuals.

Psychiatrist and lawyer Richard Green was co-counsel for Curran.
