= Moore v. Regents of the University of California =

1990 California court case

- Supreme Court of California

Decided July 9, 1990
- Full case name: John Moore, Plaintiff and Appellant, v. The Regents of the University of California et al., Defendants and Respondents
- Citation(s): 51 Cal. 3d 120; 271 Cal. Rptr. 146; 793 P.2d 479

Case history
- Prior history: Review granted, California Court of Appeal decision depublished
- Subsequent history: Remanded back to Court of Appeal for further proceedings

Holding
- Plaintiff stated a cause of action in lack of informed consent and breach of fiduciary duty, but not in conversion

Court membership
- Chief Justice: Malcolm M. Lucas
- Associate Justices: Edward A. Panelli, Joyce L. Kennard, Richard M. Mosk, Armand Arabian, David N. Eagleson, Allen Broussard

Case opinions
- Majority: Panelli, joined by Lucas, Eagleson, Kennard
- Concurrence: Arabian
- Concur/dissent: Broussard
- Dissent: Mosk

Moore v. Regents of the University of California was a landmark 1990 Supreme Court of California decision. It dealt with the issue of property rights to one's own cells taken in samples by doctors or researchers.

In 1976, John Moore was treated for hairy cell leukemia by physician David Golde, a cancer researcher at the UCLA Medical Center. Moore's cancer cells were later developed into a cell line that was commercialized by Golde and UCLA. The California Supreme Court ruled that a patient's discarded blood and tissue samples are not their personal property and that individuals do not have rights to a share in the profits earned from commercial products or research derived from their cells. Afterwards, most U.S. courts have followed the decision in ruling against family members who sue researchers and universities over "improper commercialization" of their dead family member's body parts.

== Background ==
John Moore first visited UCLA Medical Center on October 5, 1976, after he was diagnosed with hairy cell leukemia. Physician and cancer researcher David Golde took samples of Moore's blood, bone marrow, and other bodily fluids to confirm the diagnosis, and also recommended a splenectomy because of the potentially fatal amount of swelling in Moore's spleen. Moore signed a written consent form authorizing the procedure that said that the hospital could "dispose of any severed tissue or member by cremation". His spleen was thereafter removed by surgeons, who were not named as defendants, at UCLA Medical Center.

Moore's blood profile returned to normal after only a few days, and further examination of his spleen led Golde to discover that Moore's blood cells were unique in that they produced a protein that stimulated the growth of white blood cells, which help to protect the body from infections.

Moore moved to Seattle, Washington after his surgery and returned to the UCLA Medical Center for follow-up visits with Golde several times, between 1976 and 1983. After a few years of traveling back to Los Angeles to see Golde and to have samples taken of bone marrow, blood, and semen, Moore asked about transferring his care to a doctor closer to home. In response, Golde offered to cover the expense of Moore's airfare and accommodations in Los Angeles, and Moore agreed to continue.

In 1983, Moore became suspicious about a new consent form he was asked to sign that said, "I (do, do not) voluntarily grant to the University of California all rights I, or my heirs, may have in any cell line or any other potential product which might be developed from the blood and/or bone marrow obtained from me". Moore initially agreed to the consent form but at later visits refused and eventually gave the form to an attorney, who then discovered a patent on Moore's cell line, dubbed "Mo", that had been issued to the regents of UCLA in 1984. It named Golde and his research assistant as the inventors.

== Lawsuit ==
After learning of the patent, Moore filed a lawsuit for a share in the potential profits from products or research that had been derived from his cell line without his knowledge or consent. Moore brought suit against Golde, the Regents of the University of California, who own and operate the university at which Golde worked and also owned the patent on the Mo cell line, Shirley G. Quan, a researcher employed by the Regents, Genetics Institute, Inc., and related entities. Moore's suit alleged that Golde had been aware of the potential for financial benefit when medical consent was obtained, but that he had concealed that from Moore. The claim was rejected by the Los Angeles Superior Court, but in 1988 the California Court of Appeal ruled that blood and tissue samples were one's own personal property and that patients could have a right to share in profits derived from them.

== Decision ==
The court found that Moore had no property rights to his discarded cells or to any profits made from them. However, the research physician did have an obligation to reveal his financial interest in the materials that were harvested from Moore, who could thus bring a claim for any injury that he sustained by the physician's failure to disclose his interests.

The court's majority opinion, written by Justice Panelli, was joined by three other justices. The opinion first looked at Moore's claim of property interests under existing law. The court first rejected the argument that a person has an absolute right to the products of their body, as his products were not unique. The court argued that the cells were "no more unique to Moore than the number of vertebrae in the spine or the chemical formula of hemoglobin".

The court then rejected the argument that Moore's spleen should be protected as property to protect his privacy and dignity. The court held that his interests were already protected by informed consent and decided that, since laws required the destruction of human organs as some indication, the legislature had intended to prevent patients from possessing their extracted organs. Finally, the property at issue may not have been Moore's cells but the cell line created from his cells.

The court then looked at the policy behind potentially considering Moore's cell line property. Because conversion of property is a strict liability tort, the court feared that extending property rights to include organs would have a chilling effect on medical research. Laboratories doing research receive a large volume of medical samples and cannot be expected to know or discover whether somewhere down the line their samples were illegally converted. Furthermore, Moore's interest in his bodily integrity and privacy are protected by the requirement of informed consent, which must also inform about economic interests.

Justice Arabian wrote a concurring opinion, stating that the philosophical, moral and religious issues presented by the case could not be decided by the court. He also argued that Moore's position would force the court to recognize a right to profit by selling one's own body tissue. Justice Broussard concurred in part and dissented in part.

Justice Mosk dissented, countering with respect to the argument that finding for Moore would mean that he would have to have been given the right to sell his tissue for profit that he could instead have been given some property rights but denied others. To do so, he noted several situations in which limits on the transfer of property are uncontroversial: for example, the property of a bankrupt individual may be sold but not given away, while a medical license or prescription drugs may be neither sold nor given away, despite all being property. At the very least, Mosk argued, Moore had the "right to do with his own tissue what the defendants did with it". That is, as soon as the tissue was removed, Moore had at least the right to choose to sell it to a laboratory or to have it destroyed. Thus, there would be no necessity to hold labs strictly liable for conversion when property rights could be broken up to allow Moore to extract a significant portion of the economic value created by his tissue. Furthermore, Moore would have to prove that had he been properly informed, neither he nor a reasonable person would have consented to the procedure in order to prove damages from a lack of informed consent. Thus, Moore's chances of proving damages through informed consent were slim. Also, Moore could not consent to the procedure but reserve the right to sell his organs. Finally, Moore could sue only his doctor for failing to adequately inform him due to the narrow doctor-patient relationship. Thus, under the majority's theory, Moore was unlikely to win, could not extract the economic value of his tissue even had he refused consent, and could not sue the parties that might be exploiting him.

== Aftermath ==
According to the Los Angeles Times, "Moore later negotiated what he called a 'token' settlement with UCLA that covered his legal fees based on the fact that he wasn't informed and hadn't agreed to the research."

Moore's cancer went into remission from 1976 to 1996 following the removal of his spleen. He died from the cancer in October 2001.

The Michael Crichton fiction novel Next specifically mentions the case and extrapolates its possible legal ramifications within the context of a fictional patient called Frank Burnet. The 2010 nonfiction book The Immortal Life of Henrietta Lacks by Rebecca Skloot and its 2017 film adaptation discuss Moore and its precedent with regards to the Lacks family.

== See also ==
- HeLa

== Sources ==
- Campbell Evans, Paula (October 1, 2006). "Patent Rights in Biological Material". Biobusiness Legal Affairs. Genetic Engineering News. p. 12.
- Epstein, Richard A.; Sharkey, Catherine (2016). Cases and Materials on Torts. Aspen Casebook Series (11th ed.). New York: Wolters Kluwer. ISBN 978-1-4548-6825-5.
