= Randall v. Orange County Council =

US legal case

- Supreme Court of California

Decided March 23, 1998
- Full case name: Michael Randall, a Minor, etc., et al., v. Orange County Council, Boy Scouts of America
- Citation(s): 17 Cal.4th 736; 952 P.2d 261; 72 Cal.Rptr.2d 453; 1998 Cal. LEXIS 1450; 98 Cal. Daily Op. Service 2054; 98 Daily Journal DAR 2798

Case history
- Prior history: 22 Cal.App.4th 1526, 26 Cal.Rptr.2d 53 (1994)
- Subsequent history: Rehearing denied (1998 Cal. LEXIS 2970)

Holding
- The Boy Scouts of America are not considered a "business establishment" and do not fall under the provisions of California's Unruh Civil Rights Act. Decision of the Court of Appeal is reversed.

Court membership
- Chief Justice: Ronald M. George
- Associate Justices: Stanley Mosk, Joyce L. Kennard, Marvin R. Baxter, Kathryn Werdegar, Ming Chin, Janice Rogers Brown

Case opinions
- Majority: George, joined by Kennard, Baxter, Chin
- Concurrence: Mosk
- Concurrence: Kennard
- Concurrence: Werdegar
- Concurrence: Brown

Laws applied
- Unruh Civil Rights Act (Cal. Civil Code § 51)

Randall v. Orange County Council, 17 Cal.4th 736, 952 P.2d 261, 72 Cal.Rptr.2d 453 (1998), was a case before the Supreme Court of California that established that groups such as the Boy Scouts of America are not considered "business establishments" as used in the state's Unruh Civil Rights Act and could not be subject to its provisions. Its companion case was Curran v. Mount Diablo Council of the Boy Scouts of America, 17 Cal.4th 670, 952 P.2d 218, 72 Cal.Rptr.2d 410 (1998).

== Background ==
Twin brothers Michael and William Randall were Cub Scouts, a membership division of the Boy Scouts of America (BSA), in Anaheim Hills with Den 4, Pack 519 of the Orange County Council. They were on their way to earning the Bear Badge which included, in one of its four advancement areas, a religious component that asserted the existence of God and required the practice of one's faith as "taught in your home, church, synagogue, mosque, or religious fellowship," as well as a pledge asserting their duty to God which was included in the opinion of the court:

We are lucky the people who wrote and signed our constitution were very wise. They understood the need of Americans to worship God as they choose. A member of your family will be able to talk with you about your duty to God. Remember, this achievement is part of your Cub Scout promise. "I, ____, promise to do my best to do my duty to God and my country."

The Randalls stated at their local Cub Scout den meeting that they had a conflict with the religious requirement. The den leader asserted to the children's mother that the requirement was necessary to proceed through the ranks. The Orange County Council agreed with this position. While initially the Orange County Council allowed the Randalls to continue to participate in Scouting activities, it refused to allow them to advance in the ranks until they asserted their duty to God.

The mother, as guardian ad litem, filed suit against the Orange County Council, alleging that the Council reversed its initial decision and expelled the Randalls from the Boy Scouts.

== The case ==
The Superior Court for the County of Orange ruled at the initial trial that the BSA was considered a "business establishment" under the terms of California's Unruh Civil Rights Act because of the preponderance of the defendants evidence that illustrated the BSA's extensive real estate holdings, revenue-generating interests, and commercial enterprises. The court ordered statutory damages of $250 awarded to the plaintiffs and a "permanent injunction against [the BSA], preventing it from excluding [the Randalls] from membership or advancement in the organization or in a den, pack, troop, or post based upon [the BSA's] religious beliefs or lack thereof, their refusal to swear an oath or a duty to God, or to use the word "God" in any pledge, oath, or promise or vow, or their failure to participate in any religious activities."

The BSA appealed the decision to the California Court of Appeal which upheld the core of the decision (that the BSA was subject to the Unruh Civil Rights Act) based on the court's earlier decision in Curran, 147 Cal.App.3d 712 (1986), but reversed the injunction. The Supreme Court of California granted review.

In a 7-0 ruling, the Supreme Court overturned the rulings of the lower court based on their decision in Curran, 17 Cal. 4th 670, that the BSA did not qualify under the Unruh Civil Rights Act as the court found it to be a "charitable organization" with interests unrelated to the economic benefit of its members, and that it did not have a commercial interest in the activities provided to its members.

As a sidebar, the Randalls reached the rank of Eagle Scout before being expelled from the BSA as a result of court prohibiting further actions by the BSA regarding their expulsion until the case was resolved.
