= Thing v. La Chusa =

California state legal decision on emotional distress

- Supreme Court of California

Decided April 27, 1989
- Full case name: Maria E. Thing v. James V. La Chusa
- Citation(s): 48 Cal.3d 644; 771 P.2d 814; 257 Cal.Rptr. 865; 57 USLW 2671

Case history
- Prior history: 233 Cal.Rptr. 911 (1987) (reversed)

Holding
- A bystander can only recover for negligent infliction of emotional distress if they are closely related to the victim, are present and aware of the injury, and suffer emotional distress as a result.

Court membership
- Chief Justice: Malcolm M. Lucas
- Associate Justices: Allen Broussard, Edward A. Panelli, Stanley Mosk, David Eagleson, John Arguelles, Marcus Kaufman

Case opinions
- Majority: Eagleson, joined by Lucas, Panelli, Arguelles
- Concurrence: Kaufman
- Dissent: Mosk
- Dissent: Broussard

Thing v. La Chusa, 48 Cal. 3d 644 (1989), was a case decided by the Supreme Court of California that limited the scope of the tort of negligent infliction of emotional distress. The majority opinion was authored by Associate Justice David Eagleson, and it is regarded as his single most famous opinion and representative of his conservative judicial philosophy.

== Factual background ==
John Thing, a minor and son of plaintiff Maria Thing, was injured when he was struck by a car driven by James La Chusa. The plaintiff was close by, but did not see or hear the accident. The plaintiff's daughter informed her of the accident, and when the plaintiff arrived on the scene, she saw her bloody and unconscious son and suffered emotional distress as a result. The trial court granted the defendant's motion for summary judgment and the plaintiff appealed.

== Opinion of the Court ==
=== Majority opinion ===
In an effort to limit a potential runaway tort and to avoid the burdensome case-by-case analysis warned of in Dillon v. Legg, the court refined the necessary elements of a claim for negligent infliction of emotional distress first enunciated in Dillon into a bright-line rule:

- The plaintiff must be closely related to the injury victim,
- The plaintiff must be present at the scene at the time of the injury, and must be aware that the victim is being injured, and
- The plaintiff must suffer emotional distress as a result

Based on the strict formulation of the second element, the court ruled that the plaintiff could not recover because she was not present at the scene and not aware of the injury at the time of the accident.

=== Kaufman's concurrence ===
Justice Kaufman's concurrence criticized both the rigid rules of the majority opinion and the flexible guidelines advocated by Justice Broussard's dissent. Kaufman bemoaned the guidelines of Dillon v. Legg as hopelessly arbitrary, and advocated a return to the zone of danger rule as enunciated in Amaya v. Home Ice, Fuel & Supply Co.

=== Mosk's dissent ===
Justice Mosk's dissent voiced substantial agreement with Broussard's dissent, but also made a point of criticizing the majority's perspective on precedent. Mosk noted that a long list of California cases, including Archibald v. Braverman, Krouse v. Graham, Molien v. Kaiser Foundation Hospitals, and State Rubbish Association v. Siliznoff evidenced an enduring theme of expanding tort liability for emotional distress.

=== Broussard's dissent ===
Justice Broussard's dissent criticized the rigid rules imposed by the majority decision as arbitrary and something that can inevitably lead to under-compensation for real emotional distress injuries. Instead of bright-line rules, Broussard advocated that liability be determined by the application of well-developed tort principles of foreseeability and duty.
