= Knight v. Jewett =

- Supreme Court of California

Decided August 24, 1992
- Full case name: Kendra Knight v. Michael Jewett
- Citation(s): 3 Cal.4th 296 (1992); 834 P.2d 696 (1992); 11 Cal.Rptr.2d 2

Case history
- Prior history: 275 Cal.Rptr. 292 (1990) (affirmed)

Holding
- Assumption of risk is still a defense to liability even under a comparative negligence scheme.

Court membership
- Chief Justice: Malcolm M. Lucas
- Associate Justices: Edward A. Panelli, Joyce L. Kennard, Stanley Mosk, Armand Arabian, Ronald M. George, Marvin R. Baxter

Case opinions
- Plurality: George, joined by Lucas, Arabian
- Concur/dissent: Mosk
- Concur/dissent: Panelli, joined by Baxter
- Dissent: Kennard

Knight v. Jewett, 3 Cal. 4th 296 (1992), was a case decided by the California Supreme Court, ruling that the comparative negligence scheme adopted in Li v. Yellow Cab Co. of California did not eliminate the defense of assumption of risk in an action for negligence.

== Background ==
The plaintiff sued for personal injuries after the defendant stepped on her hand during a touch football game.

== Decision ==
The court recognized two categories of assumption of risk. One was primary assumption of risk in which the defendant owes no duty of care to protect the plaintiff from the risk that caused the injury. The other is secondary assumption of risk in which the defendant owes a duty of care to the plaintiff, who knowingly encounters the risk created by the defendant's breach of that duty.

The court held that secondary assumption of risk had been merged into the comparative negligence scheme adopted in Li v. Yellow Cab Co. of California but that primary assumption of risk could still serve as a defense to negligence. The court determined that in a touch football game, the only duty owed by the defendant to the plaintiff is to not be reckless and wanton. Because the plaintiff was injured in the normal course of the touch football game, the injury fell under primary assumption of risk, and she was barred from recovery.
