= People v. Bland =

US criminal case

- Supreme Court of California

Argued November 19, 2001 Decided July 1, 2002
- Full case name: The People, Plaintiff and Respondent, v. Jomo K. Bland, Defendant and Appellant.
- Citation(s): 28 Cal. 4th 313; 48 P.3d 1107; 121 Cal. Rptr. 2d 546

Case history
- Prior history: Los Angeles County Superior Court, California Court of Appeals

Holding
- Intent to kill is transferrable to anyone the defendant kills, and is not limited to a specific target; thus, a defendant who unintentionally kills a bystander rather than their target is guilty of murder. Court of Appeals reversed.

Court membership
- Chief Justice: Ronald M. George
- Associate Justices: Joyce L. Kennard, Marvin R. Baxter, Kathryn Werdegar, Janice Rogers Brown, Ming Chin, Carlos R. Moreno

Case opinions
- Majority: Chin, joined by George, Baxter, Werdegar, Brown
- Dissent: Kennard, joined by Moreno

People v. Bland, 28 Cal. 4th 313 (2002), is a United States criminal case interpreting attempted murder. The defendant fired multiple shots into a car with three people, killing the driver, and injuring the other two. The evidence showed he intended to kill the driver, but did not specifically intend to kill the others. The court wrote "The crime of attempt sanctions what the person intended to do but did not accomplish, not unintended and unaccomplished potential consequences." However, the court found a person could concurrently intend to kill more than just the person targeted, both the target and others in the "kill zone" of the shots, such as when a person sets off a bomb targeting a person who is surrounded by others, who would be guilty of murder of everyone killed by the blast.

The court distinguished murder and attempted murder in that "transferred intent does not apply to attempted murder", in that if a defendant intends to kill one person but instead kills another by the act, then the defendant is guilty of murder because the intent to kill transfers. But if the defendant attempts to kill a target and fails to kill anyone in the kill zone, the intent to kill the target does not transfer to others in the kill zone as an attempted murder.

The court further distinguishes that if a defendant intends to kill a target and also kills others in the kill zone, then they are guilty of the murder of each person killed, i.e., is guilty of multiple counts of murder. However, if the defendant by the same act fails to kill anyone, defendant is only guilty of a single count of attempted murder by the act.
