= Mexicali Rose v. Superior Court =

Supreme court case

- Supreme Court of California

Decided January 23, 1992
- Full case name: Mexicali Rose et al., Petitioners, v. The Superior Court of Alameda County, Respondent; Jack A. Clark, Real Party in Interest.
- Citation(s): 4 Cal. Rptr. 2d 145, 822 P.2d 1292

Case history
- Prior history: Appeal from a judgment upon a jury verdict in favor of plaintiff
- Subsequent history: none

Holding
- If the presence of a natural food substance is due to a restaurateur's failure to exercise due care in food preparation, the injured patron may sue under a negligence theory.

Court membership
- Chief Justice: Malcolm M. Lucas
- Associate Justices: Marvin R. Baxter, Joyce L. Kennard, Edward A. Panelli, Ronald M. George, Stanley Mosk, Armand Arabian

Case opinions
- Majority: Lucas
- Concurrence: Panelli, Baxter, George
- Concurrence: Kennard
- Dissent: Mosk
- Dissent: Arabian

Mexicali Rose v. Superior Court, 1 Cal. 4th 617 (1992), was a Supreme Court of California case in which the court’s decision held that restaurants, grocery stores, and other food service establishments in California can be held liable for injuries sustained by patrons from foreign objects—including natural food parts—that are left in food.

== Background ==
William L. Berg represented Jack A. Clark in the 1992 case of Mexicali Rose v. Superior Court—a Supreme Court of California case that changed state and consumer law. While Clark was dining at a restaurant, a one-inch chicken bone that was left in his chicken enchilada became lodged in his throat. The bone caused Clark to suffer serious injuries, and he needed three throat operations to repair the damage. As a result of his injuries, Clark filed a lawsuit against the restaurant—Mexicali Rose—as well as its owner.

== Opinion of the Court ==
Originally filed in the Alameda County Superior Court, the case eventually made its way to the Supreme Court of California. The justices presiding over the case, including Chief Justice Malcolm M. Lucas, ruled in a majority opinion that the restaurant was negligent by leaving the bone in the enchilada, which overturned the precedent established in Mix v. Ingersoll Candy Co. (1936) 6 Cal.2d 674 [59 P.2d 144], a case that set the previous standard for restaurant liability. Mix v. Ingersoll Candy Co. found that restaurant owners could only be considered negligent if foreign substances were left in food, but natural food parts, such as bones, should be expected.

== Legacy ==
As a result of this ruling, as well as subsequent rulings based on this case, restaurants and grocery stores in California are held accountable to stricter safety standards—including inspections—to make food safer for customers.
