= People v. Stone =

- Supreme Court of California

Argued March 4, 2009 Decided April 23, 2009
- Citation(s): 46 Cal. 4th 131; 92 Cal. Rptr. 3d 362

Holding
- A defendant who unintentionally kills someone other than their intended target is guilty of both attempted murder and murder. Court of Appeal reversed.

Court membership
- Chief Justice: Ronald M. George
- Associate Justices: Joyce L. Kennard, Marvin R. Baxter, Kathryn Werdegar, Ming Chin, Carlos R. Moreno, Carol Corrigan

Case opinions
- Majority: Ming, joined by George, Kennard, Baxter, Werdegar, Moreno, Corrigan

People v. Stone, Supreme Court of California, 46 Cal. 4th 131, 92 Cal. Rptr. 3d 362 (2009), is a criminal case in which the court set precedent for a theory of liability that a defendant is guilty of a single attempt to murder when multiple potential victims are in the kill zone and no one is killed, but if the intended target is not killed and an untargeted person in the kill zone is killed, defendant is guilty both of attempted murder of the target and is guilty of murder of the untargeted person killed.

The case involves a drive-by shooting, which interpreted "specific" in the specific intent requirement for murder to include a generalized specific intent to kill someone, but not necessarily any specific person. A gang member with a gun travelled to where another gang was known to be congregating, pulled up in a vehicle, randomly shot into the other gang, and was convicted of attempted murder. Defendant appealed the conviction on the ground that there was no intent to kill any specific person. The court found that specific intent includes a generalized specific intent to kill someone, but not necessarily any specific person.
