= People v. Superior Court (Decker) =

- Supreme Court of California

Argued March 6, 2007 Decided May 21, 2007
- Full case name: The People of the State of California, Petitioner v. The Superior Court of Los Angeles County, Respondent (Ronald Decker, Real Party in Interest)
- Citation(s): 41 Cal. 4th 1

Court membership
- Chief Justice: Ronald M. George
- Associate Justices: Joyce L. Kennard, Marvin R. Baxter, Kathryn M. Werdegar, Ming W. Chin, Carlos R. Moreno, Carol A. Corrigan

Case opinions
- Majority: Baxter, joined by George, Kennard, Chin, Moreno, Corrigan
- Dissent: Werdegar

The People of the State of California v. Superior Court (Decker), 41 Cal. 4th 1 (2007), is a criminal case decided by the Supreme Court of California that distinguished between solicitation and attempt.

== Background ==
Decker searched out, asked, and later met with and paid an assassin to murder Decker's sister. After Decker made elaborate preparations, Decker had his final meeting with the assassin. "The assassin said, 'I want you to know, once I leave, its done. So you sure you want to go through with it?' Decker replied, 'I am absolutely, positively, 100 percent sure,'" then Decker handed over the money." The assassin was an undercover detective wearing a recording device.

Decker admitted he solicited murder, but denied he attempted murder, arguing that solicitation and attempt are not identical, with attempt having a standard of being much closer to the act intended to cause the consummation of the crime. The trial court agreed, and the attempt charge was dismissed for lack of evidence per its understanding of the law on elements of an attempt charge.

The prosecution appealed and the California Supreme Court reinstated the attempt charge. The court reasoned agreed that solicitation and attempt are different, and that solicitation does not imply attempt, the latter requiring a finding of greater proximity to fruition of the crime. But the court found that a jury might find the solicitation to have occurred at an earlier request to do the murder, and additionally find attempt at the time of the passing of the money.

== Opinion of the Court ==
The primary issue is whether Decker's acts constituted attempted murder, and the secondary issue is whether solicitation merges with attempt.

The Court relies on the slight-acts rule, which in California and more broadly says that "slight acts are enough when the intent to murder is clearly shown.” Because the hired killer was actually an undercover agent, the heaviest charge available is attempted murder. In California, solicitation occurs at the point of the request, which had already occurred when he asked the undercover agent to kill his sister. Due to the slight-acts rule, solicitation with the intent of murder, "in combination with a completed agreement to hire a professional killer and further conduct implementing the agreement, can similarly constitute an attempted murder." Because an extra step of a downpayment on the murder, the solicitation extends into attempt.

== Dissent ==
Dissent given by Justice Kathryn M. Werdegar.

"Although defendant's conduct went beyond the minimum required for solicitation, for purposes of attempt law his arrangements constitute mere preparation." In "this case, neither defendant nor the supposed assassin took a direct act toward commission of the offense," so attempt cannot have occurred.
