= Krouse v. Graham =

Californian Supreme Court case

- Supreme Court of California

Decided March 14, 1977
- Full case name: Benjamin Clifford Krouse et al., Plaintiffs and Respondents, v. Homer Adams Graham, Defendant and Appellant.
- Citation(s): 19 Cal.3d 59; 562 P.2d 1022; 137 Cal. Rptr. 863

Holding
- Obtaining a recovery for negligent infliction of emotional distress does not require visual perception of the event.

Court membership
- Chief Justice: Mathew Tobriner (Note: Acting Chief Justice)
- Associate Justices: Stanley Mosk, William P. Clark Jr., Frank K. Richardson, Raymond L. Sullivan, Donald Wright (Note: Both Sullivan and Wright were retired justices sitting under assignment.)

Case opinions
- Majority: Richardson, joined by Tobriner, Sullivan, Wright
- Dissent: Mosk, joined by Clark

Krouse v. Graham, 19 Cal.3d 59 (1977), was a case decided by the Supreme Court of California ruling that a lack of visual perception of an accident did not necessarily preclude recovery for negligent infliction of emotional distress.

== Factual background ==
Plaintiff Benjamin Krouse was in his parked car outside of his house. The plaintiff's wife was removing groceries from the car. The car driven by defendant Homer Graham collided with the parked car, injuring the plaintiff and killing his wife. The plaintiff did not see the car hit his wife, but he could see Graham's car approaching and he knew that his wife was in its path. The plaintiff sued for wrongful death and emotional distress, and the trial court returned a verdict for the plaintiff. The defendant appealed from a denied motion for a new trial.

== Decision ==
The defendant alleged error in a jury instruction that said that Krouse could recover for negligent infliction of emotional distress by simply being present at the scene of the accident. The court needed to determine whether the absence of visual perception of the accident precluded recovery under the criteria enunciated in the 1968 decision Dillon v. Legg. Dillon required the "sensory and contemporaneous observance" of the accident. The court ruled that, despite not having seen the impact, Krouse fully perceived the accident because he knew where his wife was seconds before the impact, he saw the car coming, and he knew that she must have been injured in the accident. For the first time in California, the Supreme Court held that plaintiffs, in a statutory action for wrongful death, may recover so-called "non-economic" damages: damages for the loss of the deceased's "love, companionship, comfort, care, assistance, protection, affection, society, [and] moral support."

== Related cases ==
A similar holding was made in the 1969 case Archibald v. Braverman, but Archibald was overruled by the 1989 case Thing v. La Chusa. Thing, however, did not overrule the holding of Krouse.
