= People v. Superior Court =

People v. Superior Court may refer to:

- People v. Superior Court (Romero) (1996)
- People v. Superior Court (Decker) (2007)
