= Mosk =

Mosk may refer to:

- Stanley Mosk (1912–2001), judge in California
- Richard M. Mosk (1939–2016), judge in California
- Mosque, a place of worship for followers of Islam
