= Archibald v. Braverman =

- Court: California Court of Appeals
- Full case name: Joan Archibald, Plaintiff and Appellant, v. Edward Braverman et al., Defendants and Respondents.
- Decided: July 28, 1969
- Citation: 275 Cal. App. 2d 253

Case history
- Subsequent action: Overruled in Thing v. La Chusa

Court membership
- Judges sitting: Frank Henry Kerrigan, Stephen K. Tamura, Robert Gardner (Note: Filling vacancy)

Case opinions
- Decision by: Kerrigan
- Concurrence: Tamura, Gardner

Archibald v. Braverman, 275 Cal. App. 2d 253 (1969), was a case decided by the California Court of Appeals that first ruled that visual perception of an accident was not a necessary prerequisite to recovery for negligent infliction of emotional distress under the criteria enunciated in Dillon v. Legg. The holding in Archibald was later overruled by the 1989 case Thing v. La Chusa.

== See also ==
- Krouse v. Graham, a case in 1977 with a similar ruling
