= Concurrent intent =

Concurrent intent is when there is a specific intent to commit one crime, and at the same time (concurrently) an intent to commit another. An example is when a perpetrator plants a bomb or shoots an automatic weapon in a crowded place, with an intent to kill a specified target, the perpetrator can be found to have a concurrent intent to kill others who are not specifically targeted, but who are in the kill zone. Cases defining concurrent intent in common law include People v. Stone (2009) and People v. Bland (2002), each of which involve a drive-by shooting into a crowd.
