= Justice Mosk =

Justice Mosk may refer to:

- Richard M. Mosk (1939–2016), associate justice of the California Courts of Appeal, Second District
- Stanley Mosk (1912–2001), associate justice of the California Supreme Court from 1964 to 2001
