= Justice George =

Justice George may refer to:

- James Z. George (1826–1897), chief justice of the Supreme Court of Mississippi
- Ronald M. George (born 1940), chief justice of the Supreme Court of California
- Walter F. George (1878–1957), associate justice of the Supreme Court of Georgia
