= Judge Kaufman =

Judge Kaufman or Kauffman may refer to:

- Bruce William Kauffman (1934–2021), judge of the United States District Court for the Eastern District of Pennsylvania
- Frank Albert Kaufman (1916–1997), judge of the United States District Court for the District of Maryland
- Irving Kaufman (1910–1992), judge of the United States Court of Appeals for the Second Circuit
- Samuel H. Kaufman (1893–1960), judge of the United States District Court for the Southern District of New York

== See also ==
- Marcus Kaufman (1929–2003), justice of the California Supreme Court
