= Orange Council =

Orange Council may be:

== International ==
Orange Order

- Imperial Orange Council

== Australia ==
New South Wales

- Orange City Council

== United States ==
California

- North Orange Council
- Northern Orange County Council
- Orange County Council
- Orange Empire Area Council

Massachusetts

- Orange Council, City Council
- Orange Council (Massachusetts) - BSA

New Jersey

- East Orange Council
- Orange Council (New Jersey)
- Orange Mountain Council
- Oranges & Maplewood Area Council
- South Orange Council
- West Orange Council

New York

- Fort Orange Council
- Fort Orange-Uncle Sam Council
- Orange County Council (New York)
- Orange-Sullivan Council

Texas

- Orange County Council (Texas)
