= Molien v. Kaiser Foundation Hospitals =

- Supreme Court of California

Decided August 25, 1980
- Full case name: Stephen H. Molien, Plaintiff and Appellant, v. Kaiser Foundation Hospitals, et al., Defendants and Respondents.
- Citation(s): 27 Cal. 3d 916; 167 Cal. Rptr. 831; 616 P.2d 813

Holding
- A plaintiff suffering solely from negligent infliction of emotional distress has sufficient cause of action, even if they were not also physically injured.

Court membership
- Chief Justice: Rose Bird
- Associate Justices: Mathew Tobriner, Stanley Mosk, William P. Clark Jr., Frank K. Richardson, Wiley Manuel, Frank C. Newman

Case opinions
- Majority: Mosk, joined by Bird, Tobriner, Newman, Manuel
- Dissent: Clark, joined by Richardson

Molien v. Kaiser Foundation Hospitals, 27 Cal. 3d 916 (1980), was a case decided by the Supreme Court of California that first recognized that a "direct victim" of negligence can recover damages for emotional distress without an accompanying physical injury.

== Factual background ==
A doctor employed by the defendant hospital incorrectly diagnosed a patient as having syphilis. The doctor encouraged the patient to disclose the illness to her husband, and when she communicated the erroneous diagnosis to her husband, their marital relationship was destroyed. When it was determined that the diagnosis was incorrect, the husband brought an action against the hospital for negligent infliction of emotional distress.

== Decision ==
The court ruled that the risk of harm to the husband of the patient from a misdiagnosis was reasonably foreseeable, and that the tortious conduct was directed at the patient and her husband. As a "direct victim," the strict criteria for negligent infliction of emotional distress need not be fulfilled.

== See also ==
- Cahoon v. Cummings (2000), Indiana case law
