= Mexicali Rose =

Mexicali Rose may refer to:

- Mexicali Rose (1929 film), an American film starring Barbara Stanwyck and Sam Hardy
- Mexicali Rose (1939 film), an American film starring Gene Autry, Smiley Burnette, and Noah Beery
- "Mexicali Rose" (song), a popular song with music by Jack Tenney and lyrics by Helen Stone, published in 1923
- Mexicali Rose v. Superior Court, a Supreme Court of California case
