= 1994 California elections =

- November 8, 1994
- Registered: 14,723,784
- Turnout: 60.45% (▼14.87 pp)

Elections were held in California on November 8, 1994. Primary elections were held on June 7. Up for election were all the seats of the California State Assembly, 20 seats of the California Senate, seven constitutional officers, all the seats of the California Board of Equalization, as well as votes on retention of two Supreme Court justices and various appeals court judges. The Class I US Senate seat and all 52 US House seats were up for election as well.

Ten ballot measures were also up for approval. Municipal offices were also included in the election.

== Federal offices ==
=== Senate ===
1994 United States Senate election in California
Party	Candidate	Votes	%
Democratic	Dianne Feinstein (incumbent)	3,979,152	46.74%
Republican	Michael Huffington	3,817,025	44.83%
Peace and Freedom	Elizabeth Cervantes Barron	255,301	3.00%
Libertarian	Richard Benjamin Boddie	179,100	2.10%
American Independent	Paul Meeuwenberg	142,771	1.68%
Green	Barbara Blong	140,567	1.65%
Write-in		173	<0.01%
Invalid or blank votes		386,547	4.34%
Majority		162,127	1.90%
Total votes		8,514,089	100.00%
Turnout			44.94%
Democratic hold			

=== US House ===
Republicans made gains in California's House delegation, gaining three seats.

== Constitutional Offices ==
=== Governor ===
1994 California gubernatorial election
Party	Candidate	Votes	%
Republican	Pete Wilson (incumbent)	4,781,766	55.2
Democratic	Kathleen Brown	3,519,766	40.6
Libertarian	Richard Rider	149,281	1.7
American Independent	Jerome McCready	133,870	1.5
Peace and Freedom	Gloria Estela LaRiva	80,440	0.9
No party	Write-ins	219	0.0
Invalid or blank votes		235,261	2.64
Total votes		8,900,603	100.0
Turnout			
Republican hold			

=== Lieutenant governor ===
1994 Lieutenant Governor of California election
Party	Candidate	Votes	%
Democratic	Gray Davis	4,441,429	52.42
Republican	Cathie Wright	3,412,777	40.28
Peace and Freedom	Jaime Luis Gomez	185,254	2.19
Libertarian	Bob New	180,896	2.13
Green	Daniel Moses	160,093	1.89
American Independent	Robert W. Lewis	92,642	1.09
Invalid or blank votes		427,545	4.80
Total votes		8,473,091	100.0
Turnout			
Democratic hold			

=== Secretary of State ===
1994 California Secretary of State election
Party	Candidate	Votes	%
Republican	Bill Jones	3,727,894	45.27
Democratic	Tony Miller	3,690,841	44.82
Green	Margaret Garcia	315,079	3.83
Libertarian	Peggy Christensen	248,748	3.02
American Independent	Dorothy Kreiss Robbins	151,720	1.84
Peace and Freedom	Israel Feuer	99,916	1.21
Invalid or blank votes		666,438	7.49
Total votes		8,900,636	100.00
Turnout			
Republican gain from Democratic			

=== Controller ===
1994 California State Controller election
Party	Candidate	Votes	%
Democratic	Kathleen Connell	3,983,053	48.32
Republican	Tom McClintock	3,796,387	46.06
Peace and Freedom	Elizabeth Nakano	182,836	2.22
American Independent	Nathan E. Johnson	152,356	1.85
Libertarian	Cullene Marie Lang	128,378	1.56
Invalid or blank votes		657,626	7.39
Total votes		8,900,636	100.00
Turnout			
Democratic hold			

=== Treasurer ===
1994 California State Treasurer election
Party	Candidate	Votes	%
Republican	Matt Fong	3,970,308	48.46
Democratic	Phil Angelides	3,488,891	42.58
Libertarian	John Petersen	335,452	4.09
American Independent	George M. McCoy	203,419	2.48
Peace and Freedom	Jan B. Tucker	195,667	2.39
No party	Write-ins	47	0.00
Invalid or blank votes		706,852	7.94
Total votes		8,900,636	100.0
Turnout			
Republican gain from Democratic			

=== Attorney general ===
1994 California Attorney General election
Party	Candidate	Votes	%
Republican	Dan Lungren (incumbent)	4,438,733	53.86
Democratic	Tom Umberg	3,256,070	39.51
Libertarian	Richard N. Burns	274,335	3.33
Peace and Freedom	Robert J. Evans	271,459	3.29
Invalid or blank votes		680,039	7.42
Total votes		8,920,636	100.0
Turnout			
Republican hold			

=== Insurance Commissioner ===
1994 California Insurance Commissioner election
Party	Candidate	Votes	%
Republican	Chuck Quackenbush	4,015,858	48.82
Democratic	Art Torres	3,567,996	43.38
Libertarian	Ted Brown	346,007	4.21
Peace and Freedom	Tom Condit	150,844	1.83
American Independent	A. Jacques	144,782	1.76
Invalid or blank votes		675,149	7.59
Total votes		8,900,636	100.0
Turnout			
Republican gain from Democratic			

=== Superintendent of Public Instruction ===
California State Superintendent of Public Instruction election, 1994
Candidate	Votes	%
Delaine Eastin	3,892,681	55.60
Maureen DiMarco	3,108,221	44.40
Hal Rice (write-in)	20	0.00
Invalid or blank votes	1,899,714	21.34
Total votes	8,900,636	100.0
Turnout	{{{votes}}}	%

== Board of Equalization ==
=== Overview ===
California Board of Equalization elections, 1994
Party	Votes	Percentage	Seats	+/–
Republican	3,684,744	48.04%	2	0
Democratic	3,388,312	44.17%	2	0
Libertarian	327,040	4.26%	0	0
American Independent	140,030	1.83%	0	0
Peace and Freedom	130,761	1.70%	0	0
Invalid or blank votes	1,180,321	13.34%	—	—
Totals	8,851,208	100.00%	4	—

=== District 1 ===
1994 State Board of Equalization District 1 election
Party	Candidate	Votes	%
Democratic	Johan Klehs	1,107,750	51.47
Republican	Robert "Bob" Strawn	835,235	41.13
Libertarian	Kennita Watson	159,144	7.39
Invalid or blank votes		420,165	16.33
Total votes		2,522,294	100.00
Turnout			
Democratic hold			

=== District 2 ===
1994 State Board of Equalization District 2 election
Party	Candidate	Votes	%
Republican	Dean Andal	1,129,995	54.13
Democratic	Robert Presley	817,539	39.16
American Independent	Ernest Vance	140,030	6.71
Invalid or blank votes		239,140	10.28
Total votes		2,326,704	100.00
Turnout			
Republican hold			

=== District 3 ===
1994 State Board of Equalization District 3 election
Party	Candidate	Votes	%
Republican	Ernest J. Dronenburg (incumbent)	1,179,103	59.23
Democratic	Mary Christian-Heising	660,596	33.19
Libertarian	Ken Mason	103,711	5.21
Peace and Freedom	Maxine Bell Quirk	47,226	2.37
Invalid or blank votes		295,344	12.92
Total votes		2,285,980	100.00
Turnout			
Republican hold			

=== District 4 ===
1994 State Board of Equalization District 4 election
Party	Candidate	Votes	%
Democratic	Brad Sherman (incumbent)	802,427	53.83
Republican	Ernie Dynda	540,411	36.26
Peace and Freedom	Shirley Rachel Isaacson	83,535	5.60
Libertarian	Lawrence D. Goldberg	64,185	2.84
Invalid or blank votes		225,672	13.15
Total votes		1,716,230	100.00
Turnout			
Democratic hold			

== Judicial system ==
=== Supreme Court of California ===
Associate Justice Ronald George, Seat 1
Vote on retention	Votes	%
Yes	3,153,849	57.02
No	2,376,799	42.98
Invalid	3,369,988	37.85
Total votes	8,900,636	100.0
Turnout		

Associate Justice Joyce Kennard, Seat 2
Vote on retention	Votes	%
Yes	3,336,442	58.67
No	2,350,567	41.33
Invalid	3,213,627	36.11
Total votes	8,900,636	100.0
Turnout		

Associate Justice Kathryn Werdegar, Seat 3
Vote on retention	Votes	%
Yes	3,423,582	61.34
No	2,158,181	38.66
Invalid	3,318,873	37.29
Total votes	8,900,636	100.0
Turnout		

== Legislature elections ==
=== State Senate ===
There are 40 seats in the State Senate. For this election, candidates running in even-numbered districts ran for four-year terms.

California State Senate - 1994	Seats
Democratic-Held	21
Republican-Held	17
Independent Held	2
1994 Elections
Republican Held and Uncontested	11
Contested	20
Democratic Held and Uncontested	8
Independent Held and Uncontested	1
Total	40

=== State Assembly ===
All 80 biennially elected seats of the State Assembly were up for election this year. Each seat has a two-year term. The Republicans took narrow control of the State Assembly.

California State Assembly - 1994	Seats
Republican-Held	41
Democratic-Held	39
1994 Elections
Democratic Incumbent and Uncontested	34
Republican Incumbent and Uncontested	23
Contested, Open Seats	23
Total	80

== Statewide ballot propositions ==
Ten ballot propositions qualified to be listed on the general election ballot in California. Eight measures passed while four failed.

=== Proposition 181 ===
(Passenger Rail and Clean Air Bond Act of 1994.) Proposition 181 failed with 34.92% of the vote.

Proposition 181 results by county No: 80–90%; 70–80%; 60–70%; 50–60%; Yes: 60–70%; 50–60%

=== Proposition 182 ===
Passed by voters, but courts struck it down.

=== Proposition 183 ===
(Recall Elections. State Officers.) Proposition 183 passed with 67.47% of the vote.

Proposition 183 results by county Yes: 70–80%; 60–70%; 50–60%

=== Proposition 184 ===
(Increased Sentences. Repeat Offenders (Three Strikes)) Proposition 184 passed with 71.85% of the vote.

Proposition 184 results by county Yes: 80–90%; 70–80%; 60–70%; 50–60%; No: 50–60%

=== Proposition 185 ===
(Public Transportation Trust Funds. Gasoline Sales Tax. Initiative Statute.) Proposition 185 failed with 19.47% of the vote.

Proposition 185 results by county No: 90–100%; 80–90%; 70–80%; 60–70%; 50–60%

=== Proposition 186 ===
(Health Services. Taxes.) Proposition 186 failed with 26.58% of the vote.

Proposition 186 results by county No: 80–90%; 70–80%; 60–70%; 50–60%; Yes: 50–60%

=== Proposition 187 ===
(Illegal Aliens. Ineligibility for Public Services. Verification and Reporting.) Proposition 187 passed with 58.93% of the vote.

Proposition 187 results by county Yes: 70–80%; 60–70%; 50–60%; No: 70–80%; 50–60%

=== Proposition 188 ===
(Smoking and Tobacco Products. Local Preemption. Statewide Regulation.) Proposition 188 failed with 29.31% of the vote.

Proposition 188 results by county No: 80–90%; 70–80%; 60–70%; 50–60%

=== Proposition 189 ===
(Bail Exception. Felony Sexual Assault.) Proposition 189 passed with 79.41% of the vote.

Proposition 189 results by county Yes: 80–90%; 70–80%; 60–70%

=== Proposition 190 ===
(Commission on Judicial Performance) Proposition 190 passed with 63.87% of the vote.

Proposition 190 results by county Yes: 60–70%; 50–60%

=== Proposition 191 ===
(Abolish Justice Courts) Proposition 191 passed with 61.05% of the vote.

Proposition 191 results by county Yes: 60–70%; 50–60%; No: 50–60%

== See also ==
- California State Legislature
- California State Assembly
- California State Assembly elections, 1994
- California State Senate
- California State Senate elections, 1994
- Districts in California
- Political party strength in U.S. states
- Political party strength in California
- Elections in California
