= Joshua Groban =

American judge (born 1973)

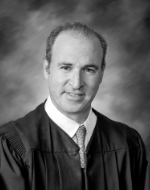

Associate Justice of the Supreme Court of California
- Incumbent
- Assumed office January 3, 2019
- Appointed by: Jerry Brown
- Preceded by: Kathryn Werdegar

Personal details
- Born: Joshua Paul Groban; August 15, 1973 (age 53)
- Party: Democratic
- Spouse: Deborah Schoeneman
- Children: 2
- Education: Stanford University (BA); Harvard University (JD)

Joshua Paul Groban (born August 15, 1973) is an American lawyer who serves as an associate justice of the California Supreme Court. He was appointed to the California Supreme Court by Governor Jerry Brown on November 14, 2018.

== Education and law career ==
Groban was raised in Del Mar, California in a Jewish family and graduated from Torrey Pines High School. His father is a physician at University of California, San Diego hospital, and his mother, Deborah Isackson Groban, served as a member of Del Mar City Council. Groban attended Stanford University, obtaining a Bachelor of Arts degree in 1995, and Harvard Law School, obtaining a Juris Doctor degree in 1998.

Groban began his legal career serving as a law clerk to U.S. District Judge William C. Conner in the Southern District of New York from 1998 to 1999. He was in private practice at Paul, Weiss, Rifkind, Wharton & Garrison in New York City from 1999 to 2005, and at Munger, Tolles & Olson in Los Angeles from 2005 to 2010.

Groban served as counsel to Brown's campaign for California governor in the 2010 California gubernatorial election. Upon Brown's election, he served in the administration overseeing state judicial appointments and advising on litigation and policy. He was Brown's fourth appointment to the seven-member Supreme Court. Groban teaches State Appellate Practice at the UCLA School of Law.

=== California Supreme Court ===
On November 14, 2018, Groban was appointed by Governor Jerry Brown to serve as an associate justice of the California Supreme Court to replace Associate Justice Kathryn Werdegar, who retired on August 31, 2017. Groban was confirmed on December 21, 2018, and was sworn into office on January 3, 2019. He joined the court when it reconvened on January 8, 2019.

As of November 11, 2022, following the 2022 election, he was retained by California voters to continue to serve as an associate justice with 68.4% of an affirmative vote.

== See also ==
- List of Jewish American jurists
- List of justices of the Supreme Court of California

Legal offices
Preceded by Kathryn Werdegar	Associate Justice of the Supreme Court of California; 2019–present	Incumbent
