= Cahoon v. Cummings =

2000 Indiana Supreme Court case

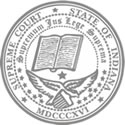
- Seal of the Supreme Court of Indiana
- Court: Indiana Supreme Court
- Full case name: Jeffrey S. Cahoon, M.D. and Shari A. Kohne and Edward L. Kennedy, Co-Executors of the Estate of Robert W. Kohne, M.D. v. Glessie Joann Cummings, wife of the deceased, William T. Cummings
- Decided: September 1, 2000
- Citations: 734 N.E.2d 535 (Ind. 2000); 15 Ohio St.3d 384

Case history
- Prior action: 715 N.E.2d 1, 9 (Ind.Ct.App.1999)

Court membership
- Judges sitting: Randall Shepard; Brent Dickson; Frank Sullivan, Jr. Theodore Boehm; Robert Rucker

Case opinions
- Unanimous opinion by Boehm

Cahoon v. Cummings, 734 N.E.2d 535 (Ind. 2000), was a case decided by the Indiana Supreme Court that adopted the loss of a chance doctrine for tort liability.

== Decision ==
The plaintiff brought a wrongful death action alleging that the defendant doctor negligently failed to diagnose the decedent's esophageal cancer. The trial court instructed the jury to find the defendant liable if the failure to diagnose was deemed a substantial factor in the decedent's death. The jury found for the plaintiff and the defendant appealed.

The Supreme Court of Indiana eschewed the substantial factor test for liability because it would unfairly hold doctors liable for the patient's underlying disease and all of the damage it caused. Instead the court adopted the loss of a chance doctrine, which allows recovery if negligence results in a substantially higher probability that harm to the plaintiff will result, even if the probability of harm is already over fifty percent. The court held that the defendants should only be held liable in proportion to the increased chance of harm caused by their negligence, and the case was remanded for a new trial.

== Impact ==
Cahoon places Indiana among 24 other states that recognize the loss of a chance doctrine, which has been criticized for unpredictably increasing medical malpractice liability.

== See also ==
- Molien v. Kaiser Foundation Hospitals (1980), California case
