= David Eagleson =

American judge

David Newton Eagleson
- From left to right: Justice Marcus Kaufman, Eagleson, Justice Joyce Kennard, and Chief Justice Malcolm Lucas

Associate Justice of the California Supreme Court
- In office March 18, 1987 – January 6, 1991
- Appointed by: Governor George Deukmejian
- Preceded by: Joseph Grodin
- Succeeded by: Marvin R. Baxter

Associate Justice of the California Court of Appeal, Second District, Division Five
- In office November 11, 1984 – March 18, 1987
- Appointed by: Governor George Deukmejian

Personal details
- Born: October 4, 1924 Los Angeles, California, U.S.
- Died: May 23, 2003 (aged 78) Long Beach, California, U.S.
- Spouse: Virginia Mae Brown (m. 1953; died 1980)
- Education: USC Gould School of Law (LL.B.)

David Newton Eagleson (October 4, 1924 – May 23, 2003) was an American lawyer who served as an associate justice of the Supreme Court of California from 1987 to 1991.

== Biography ==
Eagleson was born in Los Angeles, California, and educated in the public schools. After serving in World War II, Eagleson earned his law degree from the USC Law School in 1950. On June 6, 1951, he was admitted to the State Bar of California. Eagleson then practiced law in Long Beach, California for 20 years.

In December 1970, California Governor Ronald Reagan appointed Eagleson to the Los Angeles County Superior Court, where from 1980 to 1981 he served as presiding judge. From 1979 to 1980, he was president of the California Judges Association. In November 1981, Governor George Deukmejian named Eagleson as an associate justice to the Court of Appeal, Second District, Division Five.

In March 1987, Governor Deukmejian appointed Eagleson as an associate justice to the Supreme Court. A conservative Republican, Eagleson was elevated to the high court after voters removed liberal Chief Justice Rose Bird and two of her allies from the Court in the 1986 general election as a result of the trio's opposition to capital punishment. Eagleson tended to uphold capital sentences. During his four years on the court, Eagleson wrote 54 majority opinions. Among Eagleson's notable opinions is Thing v. La Chusa (1989), which sharply limited the availability of the cause of action for negligent infliction of emotional distress in California.

After stepping down from the high court, Eagleson practiced as a mediator and arbitrator in Los Angeles.

== Personal life ==
On May 16, 1953, Eagleson married Virginia Mae Brown, and they had two daughters, Elizabeth K. Eagleson, an attorney, and Victoria Eagleson, who both reside in Southern California. Beth, in her eulogy for her father delivered before the court on which he once served, cited Thing as the opinion most representative of her father's voice and philosophy:

When I read Thing v. LaChusa, I recognized not only Dad’s life philosophy, but I heard his voice . . . . For those of you who never knew him, but want to know what kind of man he was, read Thing v. LaChusa. Dave Eagleson is there and will tell you everything you need to know.

== See also ==
- List of justices of the Supreme Court of California

Legal offices
Preceded by Joseph Grodin	Associate Justice of the Supreme Court of California; 1987–1991	Succeeded by Marvin R. Baxter
Preceded by	Associate Justice of the California Court of Appeal, Second District, Division Five; 1984–1987	Succeeded by
