= Edward A. Panelli =

American judge (1931–2024)

Edward Alexander Panelli

Associate Justice of the Supreme Court of California
- In office December 24, 1985 – May 3, 1994
- Appointed by: George Deukmejian
- Preceded by: Otto Kaus
- Succeeded by: Kathryn M. Werdegar

Presiding Justice of the California Court of Appeal, Sixth District
- In office September 13, 1984 – December 24, 1985
- Appointed by: George Deukmejian
- Preceded by: New seat
- Succeeded by: Nat A. Agliano

Associate Justice of the California Court of Appeal, First District, Division Four
- In office 1983–1984
- Appointed by: George Deukmejian

Judge of the Santa Clara County Superior Court
- In office 1972–1983

Personal details
- Born: Edward Alexander Panelli; November 23, 1931 Santa Clara, California, U.S.
- Died: July 20, 2024 (aged 92) Saratoga, California, U.S.
- Spouse: Lorna C. Mondora (m. 1956)
- Education: Santa Clara University (BS, JD)

Edward Alexander Panelli (November 23, 1931 – July 20, 2024) was an American judge who was Associate Justice of the Supreme Court of California, serving from December 24, 1985, to May 3, 1994.

== Biography ==
Panelli was born in Santa Clara, California on November 23, 1931 to working class Italian immigrants. He received his B.S. Degree from Santa Clara University and J.D. degree from Santa Clara University School of Law. After graduation, he engaged in private practice with Pasquinelli & Panelli.

In 1972, Panelli was named a judge of the Santa Clara County Superior Court, serving until 1983. He was appointed as Associate Justice, First District Court of Appeal, Division Four, 1983–1984, and then Presiding Justice, Sixth District Court of Appeal, 1984–1985, when the Sixth District was split off from the First District in 1984. To date, Panelli is the most recent member of California's highest court to have served in a division of the First District other than Division Three. Associate Justices Kathryn Werdegar, Ming Chin, Carol Corrigan, and Martin Jenkins all served in Division Three of the First District.

In 1985, Panelli was appointed to the California Supreme Court by Governor George Deukmejian. His notable opinions include Moore v. Regents of the University of California (1990), which held that a person's discarded blood and tissue taken for medical tests are not one's personal property, and researchers do not need to share profits from their use in research or commercialization. Another notable case opinion is Jolly v. Eli Lilly (1988), in which the court held a one-year statute of limitations began running on the date of discovery of the injury. In 1989, Panelli ruled with the majority in Thing v. La Chusa, and in 1992 concurred in the results in Knight v. Jewett and Mexicali Rose v. Superior Court.

Following his retirement from the bench in 1994, he became an arbitrator and mediator. Panelli died in Saratoga, California on July 20, 2024, at the age of 92.

== Honors and legacy ==
In 1986, he was awarded an Honorary Doctor of Laws by his alma mater, Santa Clara University, where he served on the Board of Trustees. There is an annual golf tournament in his name to raise money for law school scholarships.

== Video ==
- Edward Panelli videos on C-SPAN.

== See also ==
- List of justices of the Supreme Court of California

Legal offices
Preceded by Otto Kaus	Associate Justice of the Supreme Court of California; 1985–1994	Succeeded by Kathryn M. Werdegar
Preceded by New seat	Presiding Justice of the California Court of Appeal, Sixth District; 1984–1985	Succeeded by Nat A. Agliano
Preceded by	Associate Justice of the California Court of Appeal, First District; 1983–1984	Succeeded by
