= Dillon v. Legg =

1968 Supreme Court of California case

- Supreme Court of California

Decided June 21, 1968
- Full case name: Margery M. Dillon v. David Luther Legg
- Citation(s): 68 Cal.2d 728; 441 P.2d 912; 69 Cal.Rptr. 72; 29 A.L.R.3d 1316

Holding
- A bystander that suffers damages by the conduct of a negligent tortfeasor can recover for negligent infliction of emotional distress.

Court membership
- Chief Justice: Roger J. Traynor
- Associate Justices: Mathew Tobriner, Raymond E. Peters, Stanley Mosk, Raymond L. Sullivan, Louis H. Burke, Marshall F. McComb

Case opinions
- Majority: Tobriner, joined by Peters, Mosk, Sullivan
- Dissent: Traynor
- Dissent: Burke, joined by McComb

Dillon v. Legg, 68 Cal. 2d 728 (1968), was a landmark case decided by the Supreme Court of California that established the tort of negligent infliction of emotional distress. The decision stands out as one of the most persuasive state supreme court decisions in the United States: Dillon has been favorably cited and followed by at least twenty reported out-of-state appellate decisions, more than any other California appellate decision in the period from 1940 to 2005. It was also favorably cited by the House of Lords in an important case on nervous shock, McLoughlin v O'Brian [1983].

== Background ==
A mother, Margery M. Dillon, and her daughter Cheryl witnessed the death of her other child in a car accident caused by a negligent driver, David Luther Legg. Two-year-old Erin Dillon was fatally struck by Legg's vehicle while crossing Bluegrass Road near its intersection with Clover Lane (near the Dillons' residence in the unincorporated area of Arden-Arcade in Sacramento County). The mother and daughter sued for emotional distress as a result of witnessing the accident. The trial court dismissed the claim under the prevailing zone of danger rule: the plaintiff needed to be in physical danger of the accident itself to recover for emotional distress.

== Decision ==
=== Majority opinion ===
The court relied on foreseeability to establish whether or not a negligent defendant owed a duty of care to a bystander. The court urged a case-by-case analysis of several factors to determine if foreseeability would create a duty to a bystander:

- Whether the plaintiff was near the scene of the accident,
- Whether the plaintiff suffered an emotional shock from contemporaneously observing the accident, and
- Whether the plaintiff is closely related to the victim

Using these criteria, the court determined that it was foreseeable that the negligent operation of an automobile could cause emotional distress to a mother witnessing the injury of her child in an accident.

=== Traynor's dissent ===
In his dissenting opinion, Justice Traynor asserted that the case should have been decided according to the zone of danger rule enunciated in the case Amaya v. Home Ice, Fuel & Supply Co.

=== Burke's dissent ===
In dissent, Justice Burke asserted that the majority had adopted arguments that were previously rejected in Amaya. Burke criticized the guidelines offered by the majority as insufficient protection against possibly limitless liability. Burke viewed the limitations on liability inherent in the zone of danger rule as logical and necessary, and thought that such a pronounced change in liability rules should be adopted by the legislature and not the courts.

== See also ==
- Thing v. La Chusa (1989) - transformed Dillon's test into a strict bright-line rule
