= Orange County Council =

BSA council in Orange County, California

Orange County Council (#039)
- Owner: Scouting America
- Headquarters: Santa Ana, California
- Location: Orange County, California
- Country: United States
- Founded: 1921
- Membership: 20,000
- President: Russell Etzenhouser
- Council Commissioner: Steve Bradley
- Chairman of the Board: William Baker
- Website ocscoutingamerica.org

Founded in 1920 as the Orange County Council, the council was formed by the merger of the North Orange Council (#037) and the Orange Empire Council (#039) in 1972. The North Orange Council was founded in 1944 as the Northern Orange County and changed its name to North Orange in 1965.

Orange County Council is one of the 20 largest councils by traditional membership in the nation. In 2008 it had over 40,000 youth members.

== Organization ==
- Canyons District
- El Camino Real District
- Golden West District
- Pacifica District
- Rancho San Joaquin District
- Saddleback District
- Valencia District

=== Discontinued Districts ===
- Ahwahnee District (realigned into El Capitan, Los Amigos and Orange Frontier districts effective August 1, 2008).
- Santiago District (Merged into Rancho Del Mar)
- Rancho del Mar District (split into Rancho San Joaquin and Del Mar Districts).
- El Camino Real District (split into El Camino Real and Tiburon Districts).
- Tiburon District (merged back into El Camino Real, 2017)
- Del Mar District (realigned into Pacifica and Rancho San Joaquin Districts).
- Los Amigos District (merged into Valencia District 2019).
- Portola District (merged into Valencia District 2019).
- Venturing District (2019)

== Camps ==
- Newport Sea Base on the Newport Harbor 33.6172°N 117.9190°W
- Oso Lake33.6624°N 117.6228°W
- The Irvine Ranch Outdoor Education Center 33.8024°N 117.7541°W

== Former Council Camps ==
- Schoepe Scout Reservation at Lost Valley (sold)
- Camp RoKiLi, at Barton Flats (closed)
- White's Landing (closed)
- Rancho Las Flores at Camp Pendelton (closed)
- Camp Myford, Irvine (closed)

== Order of the Arrow ==
The Orange County Council's Order of the Arrow Lodge, Wiatava #13, was the home lodge of the National Chief of the Order of the Arrow, Evan Chaffee, in 2007.

== See also ==
- Randall v. Orange County Council
- Scouting in California
