= Marcus Kaufman =

American judge

Marcus Maurice Kaufman
- From left to right: Kaufman, Justice David Eagleson, Justice Joyce Kennard, and Chief Justice Malcolm Lucas

Associate Justice of the California Supreme Court
- In office March 18, 1987 – January 31, 1990
- Appointed by: Governor George Deukmejian
- Preceded by: Cruz Reynoso
- Succeeded by: Armand Arabian

Associate Justice of the California Court of Appeal, Fourth Appellate District, Second Division
- In office 1970 – March 17, 1987
- Appointed by: Governor Ronald Reagan

Personal details
- Born: June 19, 1929 Norfolk, Virginia, U.S.
- Died: March 26, 2003 (aged 73) San Francisco, California, U.S.
- Spouse: Eileen Wilkin
- Education: University of California, Los Angeles (BA); USC Law School (LLB)

Marcus Maurice Kaufman (June 19, 1929 – March 26, 2003) served as the 103rd justice on the Supreme Court of California from March 18, 1987, until his retirement on January 31, 1990. Prior to his appointment to the Supreme Court, Justice Kaufman served for 17 years as an Associate Justice of the California Court of Appeal, Fourth Appellate District, Second Division.

== Early life ==
Born in Norfolk, Virginia, Kaufman moved with his family to Los Angeles, California, at a young age. He grew up in the Hollywood area, and developed an interest in law while in high school. He would later recall taking the bus to the L.A. Civic Center to watch federal court proceedings. After earning his bachelor's degree at UCLA, he served in the Korean War as an Army lieutenant.

== Law career ==
After returning home, Kaufman attended USC Law School where he was editor of the Southern California Law Review, and in 1956 graduated first in his class with Order of the Coif honors. He graduated in 1956 and from 1956 to 1957 served as a law clerk to then Associate Justice Roger J. Traynor. Kaufman began his career clerking in the same court to which he would eventually return as Justice. After a year of clerking, Kaufman joined the faculty of the University of Southern California Law Center. Years later, he had a very distinguished career in private practice in San Bernardino.

== Judicial career ==
In 1970, Governor Ronald Reagan appointed Kaufman as an associate justice of the Court of Appeal of California's Fourth Appellate District, Division Two. His opinion in Fletcher v. Western National Life Ins. Co. in 1970, while on the Fourth District Court of Appeal is regarded as an insightful view of what was to come from the California Supreme Court in Gruenberg v. Aetna Ins. Co. in 1973 and then Silberg v. California Life Ins. Co., in 1974, when the court embraced the essential concepts of insurance bad faith as a tort remedy in California.

In 1987, Kaufman was one of three justices appointed by Republican Governor George Deukmejian to replace Chief Justice Rose Bird and two other liberal justices voted out of office in the previous November's elections. He was expected to be among the most conservative members of the court. At times he lived up to this expectation: he joined the conservative majority in upholding the death penalty and wrote the majority opinion when the court allowed police to erect roadblocks in an effort to get drunk drivers off the road. Kaufman also wrote the majority opinion that allowed a corporate farm to restrict access of union organizers to worker camps on its property. But he sided with the liberal minority in dissenting on some important civil rulings: he opposed restricting wrongful-termination suits against employers and barring the use of state antitrust laws against corporate mergers. In another case, he joined with liberal justices to uphold the right of criminal defendants to gain access to confidential police brutality complaints.

Kaufman was viewed as a thoughtful and scholarly student of the law, always interested in carefully scrutinizing issues, precedent, and argument. He was especially notable for his kindness and concern for staff. On January 31, 1990, Kaufman retired from the bench to spend more time with his family. In 1995, he joined the newly formed Albert, Weiland & Golden in Costa Mesa, California, where he was of counsel and did consulting work on appeals.

== Declining health and death ==
Kaufman died of renal failure on March 26, 2003, at the age of 73 after several years of poor health. Kaufman was survived by his wife of more than 50 years, Eileen, and two daughters, Sharon and Ellen. A son, Joel, died in 1977.

In facing death, Kaufman told his family that one can live on after death. To this end, he wrote the following: "Ideas, values and ideals do not perish with the mind that conceived them or the life that exemplified them. They live on and play a part in the lives of those to whom they have been transmitted. And so people live on after death in the ideas, values and ideals they transmitted during their lives, which often continue to grow and spread even after death." Those ideas, he said, need not be monumental. They can be such worthwhile concepts as "an appreciation of beauty, love of family, a recognition or fulfillment of duty or loyalty, a love of excellence, or an admiration of and appreciation for achievement."

== Honors and awards ==
Two awards are named in Kaufman's honor:

Kaufman Campbell Award- Presented by the San Bernardino County Bar Association in honor of Marcus M. Kaufman and Joseph B. Campbell. This award is given to the judges who have demonstrated the highest standards of judicial excellence in the pursuit of justice while exemplifying courtesy, integrity, wisdom and impartiality.

Marcus Kaufman Jurisprudence Award- Presented by the Anti-Defamation League of Orange County/Long Beach in memory of Kaufman for his exceptional work and commitment both to the legal community and to the Orange County Judiciary.

== Selected publications ==
- Kaufman, Marcus M.; Kornblum, Guy O.; Levine, Harvey R. (1988). California practice guide--bad faith. Encino, CA: Rutter Group. OCLC 22339349.
- Kaufman, Marcus M.; Croskey, H. Walter; Heeseman, Rex (1995). California practice guide. Insurance litigation. Encino, CA: Rutter Group. OCLC 32685549.
- Kaufman, Marcus (August 1990). "Crisis in the Courts". California Lawyer: 28. OCLC 22339867.

== See also ==
- List of justices of the Supreme Court of California

Legal offices
Preceded by Cruz Reynoso	Associate Justice of the California Supreme Court; 1987–1990	Succeeded by Armand Arabian
Preceded by	Associate Justice of the California Court of Appeal, Fourth Appellate District, Second Division; 1970–1987	Succeeded by
