= John Arguelles =

American judge (1927–2022)

John A. Arguelles

Associate Justice of the Supreme Court of California
- In office March 18, 1987 – March 1, 1989
- Nominated by: George Deukmejian
- Preceded by: Malcolm Lucas
- Succeeded by: Joyce L. Kennard

Personal details
- Born: John Arthur Arguelles; August 22, 1927 Los Angeles, California, U.S.
- Died: April 10, 2022 (aged 94)
- Spouse: Martha Rivas
- Children: 3
- Education: University of California, Los Angeles (BA, JD)

John Arthur Arguelles (August 22, 1927 – April 10, 2022) was an American attorney and associate justice of the Supreme Court of California from March 18, 1987, to March 1, 1989. Arguelles was the second Latino to serve on California's high court and was one of the founding members of the Mexican American Bar Association of Los Angeles.

== Early life and education ==
Born in Los Angeles, California, Arguelles attended Garfield High School in East Los Angeles, graduating in 1945. He served in the United States Navy during World War II, from 1945 to 1946. After his discharge, he received a B.A. in economics from the University of California at Los Angeles in 1950, and a J.D. from the UCLA School of Law in 1954.

== Legal and judicial career ==
Arguelles was admitted to the California State Bar on January 5, 1955, he was in private practice with the firm of Munnell, Mullendore, Peetris & Arguelles in Los Angeles from 1955 to 1963. In 1961, he was elected to the Montebello City Council, where he served until 1963. He then held a series of judicial offices.

He was appointed by California Governor Pat Brown as a Judge of the East Los Angeles Municipal Court, serving December 4, 1963 – September 19, 1969. In 1969, Governor Ronald Reagan appointed Arguelles as a Judge of the Los Angeles County Superior Court, where he presided for nearly 15 years from September 19, 1969 to May 14, 1984. In 1984, Governor George Deukmejian elevated Arguelles to Associate Justice of the California Court of Appeal, Second Appellate District, Division 4, where he served May 14, 1984 – March 18, 1987. Finally, Arguelles was appointed by Governor Deukmejian as an associate justice of the California Supreme Court, March 18, 1987 – March 1, 1989. Though a registered Democrat, Arguelles was usually part of the conservative majority on the previously liberal-minded court. In 1989, he decided to retire from the court. He stated, “I had anticipated spending longer on the court. But there is a great deal of separation from your family and perhaps I didn’t fully comprehend the effect that has.”

Following his court service, he became counsel to the white shoe law firm of Gibson, Dunn & Crutcher, and also served as an arbitrator and mediator. In 1992, he was a special consultant to the Los Angeles County Board of Supervisors to study how to cut litigation costs.

Arguelles was vice-chair of the Independent Commission on the Los Angeles Police Department, chaired by Warren Christopher, which was created following the videotaped beating of Rodney King by police.

== Honors and awards ==
In 1987, Arguelles was lauded by UCLA Law School as Alumni of the Year and, in 1989, he received the UCLA Professional Achievement Award. In 2003, Arguelles was honored as Judge of the Year by the Orange County Hispanic Bar Association.

Arguelles was a member of the California branch of the Sons of the American Revolution.

== See also ==
- List of Hispanic and Latino American jurists

== See also ==
- List of justices of the Supreme Court of California

Political offices
Preceded by Malcolm Lucas	Associate Justice of the California Supreme Court; 1987–1989	Succeeded by Joyce L. Kennard
