= Marvin R. Baxter =

American judge

Marvin Baxter
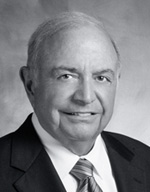

Associate Justice of the Supreme Court of California
- In office January 1991 – January 5, 2015
- Appointed by: George Deukmejian
- Preceded by: David Eagleson
- Succeeded by: Mariano-Florentino Cuéllar

Associate Justice of the California Court of Appeal, Fifth District
- In office December 1988 – January 1991
- Nominated by: George Deukmejian

Personal details
- Born: January 9, 1940 (age 86) Fowler, California, U.S.
- Education: California State University, Fresno; UC Hastings College of the Law

Marvin Ray Baxter (born January 9, 1940) is a former Associate Justice of the Supreme Court of California who served from January 1991 to January 5, 2015.

== Background ==
Baxter was born in Fowler, California, and was raised on his family's farm. He is of Armenian descent; all four of his grandparents were born in Armenia and later moved to the United States. His paternal grandfather changed the family surname from Bagdasarian to Baxter because of strong anti-Armenian prejudice in the Fresno area during the 1930s.

Baxter graduated from Fowler High School and went on to attend California State University, Fresno, where he earned his undergraduate degree in economics. In November 1961, as Fresno student body president he received a telegram of support from President John F. Kennedy for the Mercy Bowl football game. Upon graduation, Baxter became a Coro Foundation Fellow in Public Affairs (1962–63), then entered UC Hastings College of the Law, from which he earned his law degree in 1966.

In 1967, Baxter began his legal career as a Fresno County deputy district attorney. Subsequently, he entered private practice in civil law in 1969. It was during this time he was an associate and then a partner in the Fresno law firm of Andrews, Andrews, Thaxter, Jones and Baxter where he practiced civil law.

In 1983, he moved back into public service as Appointments Secretary to Governor George Deukmejian, advising him on judicial and executive appointments.

In December 1988, Governor Deukmejian appointed Baxter as an associate justice of the California Court of Appeal for the Fifth District. In January 1991, he was appointed Associate Justice of the Supreme Court of California. He was retained by the electorate in November 2002, with 71.5% of the vote, for a 12-year term.

Baxter retired from the court at the end of his term on January 4, 2015.

== Judicial philosophy ==
Baxter preferred not to describe his own judicial philosophy, but a 1993 article in the Los Angeles Times described him as having an "emerging reputation among court observers as cautious, conservative and competent". Observers split between those who considered him a solid part of the Court's conservative majority (led by Malcolm M. Lucas), and others who considered him harder to pin down.

Baxter's notable case opinions include People v. Superior Court (Decker), in which he wrote the majority opinion finding the hiring of a "hit man" to kill constituted attempted murder. Baxter voted with the majority in: Randall v. Orange County Council (1998), concerning the applicability of a civil rights statute to the Boy Scouts of America; Strauss v. Horton (2009), regarding Proposition 8 and same-sex marriage; and People v. Diaz (2011), finding police may search a cell phone obtained during an arrest without a warrant. He joined the concurrence and dissent of Justice Edward A. Panelli in Knight v. Jewett (1992), holding assumption of risk could still bar a claim for negligence. In 2008, he was part of the dissenting minority in In re Marriage Cases, a 4–3 decision legalizing same-sex marriage in California.

== Honors and awards ==
On May 16, 2015, Baxter received an honorary Doctor of laws degree from California State University, Fresno.

== See also ==
- List of justices of the Supreme Court of California
- Armand Arabian

Legal offices
Preceded by David Eagleson	Associate Justice of the Supreme Court of California; 1991–2015	Succeeded by Mariano-Florentino Cuéllar
Preceded by	Associate Justice of the California Court of Appeal, Fifth District; 1988–1991	Succeeded by
