= People v. Superior Court (Romero) =

- Supreme Court of California

Decided 1996
- Full case name: THE PEOPLE, Petitioner, v. THE SUPERIOR COURT OF SAN DIEGO COUNTY, Respondent; JESUS ROMERO, Real Party in Interest.
- Citation(s): 13 CAL. 4TH 497, 917 P.2D 628, 53 CAL. RPTR. 2D 789

Holding
- A sentencing judge may dismiss a defendant's strike prior pursuant to California Penal Code 1385

Laws applied
- Cal. Penal Code §§ 1385, 667(b);

The People of the State of California v. Superior Court (Romero), 13 CAL. 4TH 497, 917 P.2D 628 (Cal. 1996), was a landmark case in the state of California that gave California Superior Court judges the ability to dismiss a criminal defendant's "strike prior" pursuant to the California Three-strikes law, thereby avoiding a 25-to-life minimum sentence.

== Case ==
The San Diego County District Attorney charged defendant Jesus Romero for possession of .13 grams of cocaine base. Additionally, the District Attorney alleged that the defendant had two previous "strike" convictions, one for residential burglary and one for attempted residential burglary.

Prior to trial, the judge offered to dismiss one of the defendant's strike priors in exchange for a plea of guilty. The judge believed that a sentence of 25-to-life for simple possession of narcotics would unjustly punish the defendant. The District Attorney objected, arguing that the court did not have the power to dismiss a strike prior pursuant to California Penal Code section 1385.

== Decision ==
After the court dismissed the defendant's strike the District Attorney appealed the ruling to the California Supreme Court. The Court ruled unanimously in favor of the trial judge/defendant, writing, "Accordingly, in cases charged under that law, a court may exercise the power to dismiss granted in section 1385, either on the court's own motion or on that of the prosecuting attorney, subject, however, to strict compliance with the provisions of section 1385 and to review for abuse of discretion."

== Effects and aftermath ==
The decision paved the way for defendants to file a legal motion to avoid 25-to-life sentences; such motions are now commonly referred to as "Romero motions." Two years later the California Supreme Court clarified its ruling in Romero, providing a set of criteria by which trial court judges should determine whether to grant a Romero motion.
