= Armand Arabian =

American judge (1934–2018)

Associate Justice of the Supreme Court of California
- In office February 3, 1990 – February 28, 1996
- Nominated by: George Deukmejian
- Preceded by: Marcus Kaufman
- Succeeded by: Ming W. Chin

Personal details
- Born: December 12, 1934 New York City, U.S.
- Died: March 28, 2018 (aged 83)
- Spouse: Nancy Megurian (m. 1962)
- Education: Boston University (BA, JD); University of Southern California (LLM)

Armand M. Arabian (December 12, 1934 – March 28, 2018) was an American lawyer and jurist who served as an associate justice of the Supreme Court of California from 1990 to 1996.

== Early life and education ==
Armand was born in New York City to John and Aghavnie (née Yalian) Arabian, who had immigrated from Armenia following the 1915 Armenian genocide. Arabian received a B.A. in psychology from Boston University in 1956. He served as a lieutenant in the U.S. Army from 1956 to 1958. After his discharge, he obtained a J.D. from Boston University School of Law in 1961, and a LL.M. from the University of Southern California Law Center in 1970.

== Legal and judicial career ==
Before his appointment to the court, Arabian was a Los Angeles County Deputy District Attorney, 1962–1963, and an attorney in private practice in Van Nuys, California, 1963–1972. In 1972, Arabian was appointed by California Governor Ronald Reagan as a Los Angeles Municipal Court Judge, where he served one year. Arabian was then elevated by Governor Reagan to the Los Angeles County Superior Court, where he presided from 1973 to 1983.

In 1979, Arabian's initial appointment to the Court of Appeals was the subject of controversy: "When California Governor Jerry Brown left the state to campaign for the presidency in 1979, California Lieutenant Governor Mike Curb appointed Armand Arabian to the court of appeal, knowing well that Brown intended to appoint someone else. When Brown returned, he withdrew Arabian's appointment and made his own. The ensuing dispute reached the state supreme court, which ruled both the appointment and the withdrawal legal." Four years later, Governor George Deukmejian officially appointed Arabian an associate justice of the California Court of Appeal, Second District, where he served from 1983 to 1990.

In 1990, Deukmejian appointed Arabian as the 105th justice to the California Supreme Court, where he served until his retirement in 1996. As a jurist, Arabian was known as a law-and-order conservative.

On the court, he was a leader in the reform of California rape laws. In a 1973 criminal trial, Arabian declined to instruct the jury to treat skeptically the victim's testimony—to the effect that a rape charge "is easily made and, once made, difficult to defend against"—an instruction the state Supreme Court had ruled was mandatory. In 1994, Arabian wrote the unanimous opinion in People v. Iniguez (1994), which held that a sexual assault without struggle can be deemed rape, instead of the lesser crime of sexual battery.

After stepping down from the bench, Arabian worked as a mediator and arbitrator. He also served on the Board of Visitors at Pepperdine University School of Law.

== Honors and awards ==
Arabian received numerous honors and awards. In 1973, the Armenian Professional Society conferred on him its annual Achievement Award. In 1981, Arabian received Boston University School of Law's Silver Shingle Award for Distinguished Service to the Legal Profession, and in 1990, he was awarded the Distinguished Alumni Award from Boston University. In 2011, Arabian was honored with the Lifetime Achievement Award of the San Fernando Valley Bar Association's Community Legal Foundation. Arabian was given honorary Doctor of Law degrees by several law schools, including: Southwestern School Law, 1990; Pepperdine University, 1990; University of West Los Angeles, 1994; Thomas Jefferson School of Law, 1997; and American College Law, 2001.

== Personal life ==
On August 26, 1962, he married Nancy Megurian (February 17, 1939 – July 21, 2016) in Los Angeles, California. They had two children: a daughter, Allison Ann Demurjian, and a son, Robert Armand Arabian, who is also an attorney. He died on March 28, 2018, at the age of 83.

== Selected publications ==
Arabian, Armand (2011). From Gravel to Gavel. Los Angeles, CA: Flagship Books. ISBN 978-0615550435.

--- (2010). The Sexual Assault Counselor-Victim Privilege: Jurisdictional Delay into an Unclaimed Sanctuary, 37 Pepp. L. Rev. 5, an update of his earlier article, "The Cautionary Instruction in Sex Cases: A Lingering Insult," 10 Sw. L. Rev. 585 (1985).

--- (November 1995). "Condos, Cats and CC&R's: Invasion of the Castle Common," 23 Pepperdine L. Rev. 1.

== Photos and video ==
- Photo of Armand Arabian, January 10, 2011, at his Van Nuys, California, law office.
- Appearances on C-SPAN

== See also ==
- List of justices of the Supreme Court of California
- Marvin R. Baxter

Legal offices
Preceded by Marcus Kaufman	Associate Justice of the Supreme Court of California; 1990–1996	Succeeded by Ming W. Chin
