= Negligent infliction of emotional distress =

Tort

The tort of negligent infliction of emotional distress (NIED) is a controversial cause of action, which is available in nearly all U.S. states but is severely constrained and limited in the majority of them. The underlying concept is that one has a legal duty to use reasonable care to avoid causing emotional distress to another individual. If one fails in this duty and unreasonably causes emotional distress to another person, that actor will be liable for monetary damages to the injured individual. The tort is to be contrasted with intentional infliction of emotional distress in that there is no need to prove intent to inflict distress. That is, an accidental infliction, if negligent, is sufficient to support a cause of action.

== History ==
NIED began to develop in the late nineteenth century, but only in a very limited form, in the sense that plaintiffs could recover for consequential emotional distress as a component of damages when a defendant negligently inflicted physical harm upon them. By 1908, most industrial U.S. states had adopted the "physical impact" form of NIED where some form of physical conduct had to occur. However, NIED started developing into its more mature and more controversial form in the mid-20th century, as the new machines of the Second Industrial Revolution flooded the legal system with all kinds of previously unimaginable complex factual scenarios. Courts began to allow plaintiffs to recover for emotional distress resulting from negligent physical injuries to not only themselves, but other persons with whom they had a special relationship, like a relative. Courts also began to permit trivial forms of contact to satisfy the physical impact requirement. The first step, then, was to remove the requirement of physical injury to the actual plaintiff while keeping the requirement of physical injury to someone. In the 1968 landmark decision of Dillon v. Legg, the Supreme Court of California was the first court to allow recovery for emotional distress alone – even in the absence of any physical injury to the plaintiff – in the particular situation where the plaintiff simply witnessed the death of a close relative at a distance, and was not within the "zone of danger" where the relative was killed. A 2007 statistical study commissioned by the Court found that Dillon was the most persuasive decision published by the Court between 1940 and 2005; Dillon has been favorably cited and followed by at least twenty reported out-of-state appellate decisions, more than any other California appellate decision.

The next step after Dillon was to make optional the element of another person (so that the injury could be to anything where it would be reasonably foreseeable that such injury would cause some person emotional distress). The first such case was Rodrigues v. State, in which the Supreme Court of Hawaii held that plaintiffs could recover for negligent infliction of emotional distress as a result of negligently caused flood damage to their home. This is generally considered to be the true birth of NIED as a separate tort.

Twelve years after Dillon, California expanded NIED again, by holding that a relative could recover even where the underlying physical injury was de minimis (unnecessary medications and medical tests) if the outcome was foreseeable (the breakup of the plaintiffs' marriage as a result of the defendants' negligent and incorrect diagnosis of a sexually transmitted disease).

In 1994, the U.S. Supreme Court for the first time recognized NIED as part of federal common law, by holding that railroad workers could pursue NIED claims against their employers under the Federal Employers Liability Act. The Court recognized only the pre-Dillon form of NIED, though, in that the plaintiff had to be within a zone of danger to recover in the absence of physical injury.

In 1999, Hawaii took NIED even further by expressly holding that "damages may be based solely upon serious emotional distress, even absent proof of a predicate physical injury."

== Criticism ==
It is generally disfavored by most states because it appears to have no definable parameters and because so many potential claims can be made under it. The situations that would give rise to such a claim are difficult to define. Because of this substantial uncertainty, most legal theorists find the theory to be unworkable in practice.

A corollary of this critique is that the tort runs the risk (in the bystander NIED context) of overcompensating plaintiffs for distress which would have occurred anyway regardless of the cause of death of the decedent. In a landmark decision of the Supreme Court of California which severely limited the availability of bystander NIED, Associate Justice David Eagleson wrote in Thing v. La Chusa, 48 Cal. 3d 644 (1989):

No policy supports extension of the right to recover for NIED to a larger class of plaintiffs. Emotional distress is an intangible condition experienced by most persons, even absent negligence, at some time during their lives. Close relatives suffer serious, even debilitating, emotional reactions to the injury, death, serious illness, and evident suffering of loved ones. These reactions occur regardless of the cause of the loved one's illness, injury, or death. That relatives will have severe emotional distress is an unavoidable aspect of the 'human condition.' The emotional distress for which monetary damages may be recovered, however, ought not to be that form of acute emotional distress or the transient emotional reaction to the occasional gruesome or horrible incident to which every person may potentially be exposed in an industrial and sometimes violent society. . . . The overwhelming majority of 'emotional distress' which we endure, therefore, is not compensable.

An additional criticism of the tort is that it leads to abuse of liability insurance coverage. Most liability insurance policies provide for coverage of negligently inflicted injuries but exclude coverage of intentionally inflicted injuries. If a victim is intentionally injured by a person, many theorists perceive that the victim will tend to recast the claim as being one for negligence in order to fall within the coverage of the insurance policy.

The Texas case of Boyles v. Kerr, 855 S.W.2d 593 (Tex. 1993) is illustrative. In this case, the defendant secretly videotaped himself engaging in sexual activities with the plaintiff. The defendant then showed this videotape to numerous individuals and caused severe distress to the plaintiff. The plaintiff brought suit against the defendant, asserting a claim for negligent infliction of emotional distress.

On appeal, the Supreme Court of Texas observed that the facts did not support a claim of negligence. Rather, the Court noted, the facts clearly supported a claim of an intentional injury by the defendant and it was evident that the claim had been cast as "negligence" solely to obtain insurance coverage. The Court then went on to hold that Texas did not recognize a claim for negligent infliction of emotional distress and remanded the case to the trial court for consideration of a claim for intentional infliction of emotional distress.

Jurisdictions that have rejected the claim of negligent infliction of emotional distress do not forbid the recovery of damages for mental injuries. Instead, these jurisdictions usually allow recovery for emotional distress where such distress:

- is inflicted intentionally (i.e., intentional infliction of emotional distress)
- is directly associated with a physical injury negligently inflicted upon a victim (e.g., emotional distress resulting from a loss of limb or disfigurement of the face)
- is caused by defamation and libel;
- stems from witnessing a gruesome accident as a bystander
- is the product of some misconduct universally recognized as causing emotional distress such as mishandling a loved one's corpse or failing to deliver a death notice in a timely manner.
