= Richard M. Mosk =

American judge

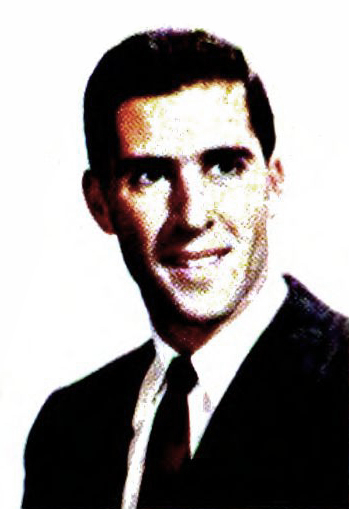
Mosk in the Stanford University yearbook, 1960

Richard M. Mosk (May 18, 1939 – April 17, 2016) was an American jurist who served as an associate justice of the California Courts of Appeal, Second District.

== Early life, education, and military service ==
Mosk was born in Los Angeles, California, and was the son of Helen Edna (Mitchell) and Stanley Mosk, a former California Attorney General and state Supreme Court Justice.

He graduated from Stanford University, with great distinction and Harvard Law School, cum laude. While at Stanford, he earned three athletic letters. After military service, he was a member of the staff of the Warren Commission (President's Commission on the Assassination of President John F. Kennedy) and a clerk to California Supreme Court Justice Mathew Tobriner.

== Legal career ==
Mosk was a litigation partner in a large Los Angeles law firm. He was a Special Deputy Federal Public Defender, 1975–76. Mosk was the United States appointed judge on the Iran-United States Claims Tribunal when it was formed and served from 1981 to 1984. He was a substitute judge on that Tribunal from 1984 to 1997. In 1997, he was reappointed to that Tribunal and served until 2001, when he was appointed as an associate justice of the California Court of Appeal.

Mosk was a member of the Los Angeles County-City Fire Board of Inquiry that made recommendations to deal with brush fires. He was chair of the Los Angeles County Commission on Judicial Procedures and a member of the Board of Directors of the Los Angeles County Law Library, of the California Museum of Science and Industry, and of Town Hall of California. He was a member of the Stanford Athletic Board. He was also a member of the Christopher Commission that investigated the Los Angeles Police Department (1991) and was chairman and co-chairman of the Motion Picture Classification and Rating Administration that provides the parental ratings for motion pictures (1994–2000). As a lawyer, Mosk argued cases before various appellate courts, including the United States Supreme Court and California Supreme Court. He sat pro tem on the California Supreme Court. Mosk was on many domestic and international arbitration panels and was a member of a number of bar associations. He was president of the Los Angeles chapter of the Federal Bar Association and on the Council of the ABA Section of International Law and Practice. He served as a California State Bar Association examiner and as a member of the California State Bar Association Disciplinary Committee. He has lectured at The Hague Academy of International Law and at law schools in Europe, Australia and the United States. Mosk taught an undergraduate class at the University of Southern California. He has written articles for numerous publications. His oral history was published in California Legal History. He died on April 17, 2016, from pancreatic cancer.

== Personal life ==
Mosk was married to Sandra (Budnitz) Mosk, an educational therapist. He had two children, Julie Morris, a psychologist, and Matthew Mosk, an Emmy award-winning television producer.
