= Kathryn Werdegar =

American judge

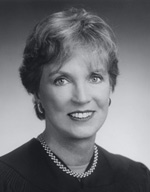

Associate Justice of the Supreme Court of California
- In office June 3, 1994 – August 31, 2017
- Nominated by: Pete Wilson
- Preceded by: Edward Panelli
- Succeeded by: Joshua Groban

Associate Justice of the California Court of Appeal, First District
- In office 1991 – June 2, 1994
- Preceded by: Gary E. Strankman

Personal details
- Born: Kathryn Jocelyn Mickle; April 5, 1936 (age 90) San Francisco, California, U.S.
- Spouse: David Werdegar (m. 1961)
- Children: Maurice Werdegar (1964), Matthew Werdegar (1969)
- Education: UC Berkeley (BA); George Washington University (JD)

Kathryn Jocelyn Mickle Werdegar (born April 5, 1936) is a former Associate Justice of the Supreme Court of California, serving from June 3, 1994, to August 31, 2017.

== Biography ==
Werdegar earned her B.A. with honors at the University of California, Berkeley and then attended the University of California, Berkeley School of Law, class of 1962, before completing her J.D. degree at the George Washington University Law School, where she graduated as valedictorian of her class. While at Berkeley Law, Werdegar served as editor-in-chief of the California Law Review. In 1961, she married David Werdegar.

In 1962, following graduation, she joined the Civil Rights Division of the United States Department of Justice working under Attorney General Robert F. Kennedy in Washington, D.C. In 1963, after returning to California, she held a series of legal and teaching positions, including associate dean and professor at the University of San Francisco School of Law. In 1981, she was hired as a research attorney for the state courts, where she worked with various justices, and then worked directly with Edward A. Panelli as a senior attorney.

In 1991, Governor Pete Wilson appointed Werdegar as an associate justice of the California Court of Appeal, First District.

In August 1994, Governor Wilson elevated Werdegar to the Supreme Court. In November 1994, a few months after her appointment, she won a retention election. In November 2002, she was again retained by the electorate with 74.1% of the vote. In November 2014, she was elected again to a 12-year term. On August 31, 2017, she retired from the high court. Governor Jerry Brown appointed Joshua Groban to fill the remainder of her term.

The Center for Public Integrity reported that Werdegar ruled in a case involving Wells Fargo & Co., a corporation in which she owned "between $100,001 and $1 million in stock." The Center reported that Werdegar "denied an appeal to a couple who accused Wells Fargo of predatory lending and unlawful foreclosure."

The judge responded through California Supreme Court spokesman Cathal Conneely, the Center reported. "The justice regrets the error and thanks you for bringing it to her attention."

"The Supreme Court is reexamining its internal conflict of interest procedures to prevent similar errors in the future," Conneely said.

In 2008, Justice Werdegar joined the majority opinion in the consolidated California marriage cases known as In re Marriage Cases. The court's 4-3 ruling legalized same-sex marriage in California from June 19, 2008 – November 4, 2008. The majority ruled that sexual orientation is a protected class under the California constitution and that strict scrutiny is required to review any laws distinguishing based on such. The opinion was rooted in the Equal Protection Clause of the California constitution, one similar to the one found in the Fourteenth Amendment to the United States Constitution. The court's ruling was superseded by Proposition 8 passed by California voters. Prop 8 was ultimately ruled unconstitutional in 2010, with the lengthy appeals process concluding in June 2013.

== Notable decisions ==
Smith v. Fair Employment & Housing Com. (1996) 12 Cal.4th 1143: A landlord who believed that renting to an unmarried couple is sinful was not constitutionally entitled to an exemption from a California law barring housing discrimination.

People v. Superior Court (Romero) (1996) 13 Cal.4th 497: California's "Three Strikes" law did not deprive trial courts of the power to dismiss a prior conviction allegation in furtherance of justice; courts have the authority to "strike a strike."

People v. Hill (1998) 17 Cal.4th 800: Prosecutorial misconduct over the course of a trial can have such a cumulatively prejudicial effect as to require reversing a criminal conviction.

Conservatorship of Wendland (2001) 26 Cal.4th 519: The conservator of a person who is severely impaired but conscious, and who has not left formal instructions or an appointed an agent for health care decisions, cannot withhold nutrition and hydration from the person unless it is shown by clear and convincing evidence to be the person's wish or in the person's best interests.

Sharon S. v. Superior Court (2003) 31 Cal.4th 417: California family law allowed a second parent adoption (adoption by a nonbiological parent without change in biological parent's rights and responsibilities) by the lesbian partner of the biological mother.

People v. Diaz (2011) 51 Cal.4th 84, 103 (dissent): The majority held police could search the contents of an arrested person's mobile phone without a warrant, probable cause or emergency need. Justice Werdegar dissented, concluding the warrantless search violated the Fourth Amendment. The United States Supreme Court later reached the same conclusion as Justice Werdegar. (Riley v. California (2014) 134 S.Ct. 2473.)

Brinker Restaurant Corp. v. Superior Court (2012) 53 Cal.4th 1004: Allowing a class action seeking compensation for an employer's violation of California wage and hour law. The guarantee of breaks for meals means the employer must relieve the employee of all duties during the break period, but need not ensure that no work is actually done.

Bristol-Myers Squibb v. Superior Court (Anderson) (2016) 1 Cal.5th 783, 813 (dissent): The majority held a California court had jurisdiction over claims of personal injury from use of a prescription pharmaceutical by residents of other states who neither purchased the drug in California nor were injured in the state. Justice Werdegar dissented, concluding the absence of a significant relationship between the defendant's activities in California and the nonresidents' claims deprived the court of jurisdiction. The United States Supreme Court reviewed the ruling and on June 19, 2017, issued its opinion in Bristol-Myers Squibb v. Superior Court of California, No. 16-466, agreeing with Justice Werdegar's earlier dissenting opinion.

== Selected publications ==
- Werdegar, Kathryn Mickle (1962). "Constitutionality of Federal Legislation to Abolish Literacy Tests: Civil Rights Commission's 1961 Report on Voting". George Washington University Law Review. 30 (4): 723–743.
- Wedergar, Kathryn Mickle (1968). "Solicitor General and Administrative Due Process: A Quarter-Century of Advocacy". George Washington University Law Review. 36 (3): 481–514.
- Werdegar, Kathryn (1975). California misdemeanor procedure benchbook. Berkeley, CA: California Continuing Education of the Bar.
- Werdegar, Kathryn Mickle (2012). "Living with Direct Democracy: The California Supreme Court and the Initiative Power - 100 Years of Accommodation". California Legal History. 7: 143–166.
- Werdegar, Kathryn M. (2015). "A Tribute to Justice Joe Grodin". California Legal History. 10: 8–12.

== Video ==
- Appearances on C-SPAN

== See also ==
- List of justices of the Supreme Court of California

Legal offices
Preceded by Edward Panelli	Associate Justice of the Supreme Court of California; 1994 – 2017	Succeeded by Joshua Groban
Preceded by Gary E. Strankman	Associate Justice of the California Court of Appeal, First District; 1991 – 1994	Succeeded by
