= Malcolm Lucas =

American jurist and attorney (1927-2016)

Malcolm M. Lucas
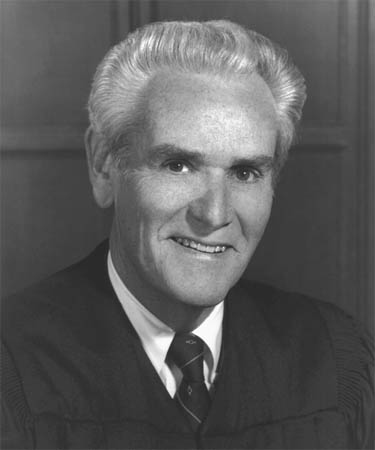

26th Chief Justice of California
- In office January 5, 1987 – May 1, 1996
- Appointed by: George Deukmejian
- Preceded by: Rose Bird
- Succeeded by: Ronald M. George

Associate Justice of the California Supreme Court
- In office April 6, 1984 – January 5, 1987
- Appointed by: George Deukmejian
- Preceded by: Frank K. Richardson
- Succeeded by: John Arguelles

Judge of the United States District Court for the Central District of California
- In office July 29, 1971 – April 6, 1984
- Appointed by: Richard Nixon
- Preceded by: Seat established by 84 Stat. 294
- Succeeded by: William J. Rea

Personal details
- Born: Malcolm Millar Lucas; April 19, 1927 Berkeley, California, U.S.
- Died: September 28, 2016 (aged 89) Los Angeles, California, U.S.
- Education: University of Southern California (BA, LLB)

Malcolm Millar Lucas (April 19, 1927 – September 28, 2016) was an American jurist and attorney who served as the 26th Chief Justice of California. He previously served as a trial judge on the Los Angeles County Superior Court and United States district judge of the United States District Court for the Central District of California.

== Education and career ==
Born in Berkeley, California, Lucas earned a Bachelor of Arts degree from the University of Southern California in 1950 and a Bachelor of Laws from the USC Gould School of Law in 1953.

From 1954 to 1967, he was in private practice in Long Beach, California. He practiced law with future Governor of California George Deukmejian.

From 1967 to 1971, he was a judge of the Los Angeles County Superior Court. In February 1970, Lucas was the trial judge in the prosecution of Charles Manson for the murder of actress Sharon Tate, which continued through January 1971. In June 1970, Lucas had Manson removed from the courtroom due to his disruptive behavior.

== United States District Court ==
On July 8, 1971, President Richard Nixon nominated Lucas to a new seat on the United States District Court for the Central District of California (based in Los Angeles) created by 84 Stat. 294. He was confirmed by the United States Senate on July 29, 1971, and received his commission the same day. His service terminated on April 6, 1984, due to his resignation.

In April 1975, Lucas sat as trial judge in the complex Equity Funding civil litigation, brought after a $3 billion fraud by executives at a life insurance company.

== California Supreme Court ==
California Governor George Deukmejian appointed Lucas to be an Associate Justice on the Supreme Court of California in 1984. He replaced Frank K. Richardson, former Governor Ronald Reagan's only remaining appointee on the Court.

In November 1986, Lucas was retained by the voters by a wide margin. However, Chief Justice Bird and two other liberal justices were not.

After Bird lost her retention election, Deukmejian announced on November 26, 1986, that he would elevate then-Associate Justice Lucas to the position of chief justice. Deukmejian then announced the appointment of three new conservative Associate Justices, David Eagleson, John Arguelles, and Marcus Kaufman, thereby creating the first conservative majority on the Court in several decades.

=== Tenure ===
The decisions of the Lucas Court were mostly pro-business, affirmed death penalty sentences imposed by the trial courts, and tended to adhere to the textualist approach. In matters of criminal law, the Lucas Court's interpretation of the law favored the government more than that of the Bird court.

The Lucas court also reversed several pro-plaintiff landmark decisions in the context of tort law and insurance law.

In 1988, Lucas implemented a practice that the justices produce opinions within 90 days of oral arguments.

In September 1989, Chief Justice Lucas delivered the "State of the Judiciary" address to the State Bar of California annual meeting in San Diego, California.

== Personal life ==
On June 23, 1956, Lucas married Donna J. Fisher in Los Angeles.

== Retirement and death ==
On October 1, 1995, he announced he would retire in May 1996 to spend more time with his family. After retiring from the Court, Lucas went back into private practice and became an arbitrator for JAMS in Los Angeles.

Lucas died on September 28, 2016, in Los Angeles, California. He was 89.

== Photos and video ==
- Photo of Judges Malcolm M. Lucas and Thomas Reavley, and U.S. Supreme Court Justice Sandra Day O'Connor, presiding at Pepperdine University's 11th annual moot court competition, 1985. UCLA Libraries.
- Appearances on C-SPAN

== See also ==
- List of justices of the Supreme Court of California

Legal offices
Preceded by Rose Bird	Chief Justice of California; 1987–1996	Succeeded by Ronald M. George
Preceded by Frank K. Richardson	Associate Justice of the Supreme Court of California; 1984–1987	Succeeded by John Arguelles
Preceded by Seat established by 84 Stat. 294	Judge of the United States District Court for the Central District of California; 1971–1984	Succeeded by William J. Rea
