= Ming Chin =

American judge

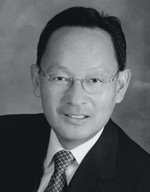

Associate Justice of the Supreme Court of California
- In office March 1, 1996 – August 31, 2020
- Appointed by: Pete Wilson
- Preceded by: Armand Arabian
- Succeeded by: Martin Jenkins

Presiding Justice of the California Court of Appeal, First District, Division Three
- In office January 2, 1995 – March 1, 1996
- Appointed by: Pete Wilson

Associate Justice of the California Court of Appeal, First District
- In office August 1990 – January 2, 1995
- Appointed by: George Deukmejian

Personal details
- Born: August 31, 1942 (age 84) Klamath Falls, Oregon, U.S.
- Spouse: Carol Joe (m. 1971)
- Children: Jennifer and Jason
- Education: University of San Francisco, (BA, JD)
- Awards: Commendation Medal; Bronze Star

Military service
- Allegiance: United States
- Branch/service: United States Army
- Rank: Captain
- Battles/wars: Vietnam War

Ming Chin
- Traditional Chinese: 陳惠明
- Simplified Chinese: 陈惠明
- Hanyu Pinyin: Chén Huìmíng
Transcriptions
Standard Mandarin
- Hanyu Pinyin: Chén Huìmíng

Ming William Chin (born August 31, 1942) is an American attorney and former Associate Justice of the Supreme Court of California, serving from March 1, 1996 to August 31, 2020.

== Biography ==
Chin was born and raised in Klamath Falls, Oregon. His family moved to San Jose, California, and he attended Bellarmine College Preparatory, graduating in 1960. Chin then received a Bachelor of Arts in political science from the University of San Francisco in 1964. Subsequently, he studied at the University of San Francisco School of Law, and obtained a Juris Doctor in 1967. After graduating, he was commissioned a Captain in the United States Army, and in 1969 was awarded both a Commendation Medal and Bronze Star for his meritorious service in the Vietnam War.

After Chin's discharge, he practiced for three years as a deputy district attorney for the Alameda County District Attorney's Office, and was promoted to felony trial deputy. In 1973, Chin entered private practice with Aiken, Kramer & Cummings, and focused on litigation. He is well known among California employment lawyers as one of the four current authors of the Rutter Group practice guide on employment litigation.

== Judicial career ==
In 1988, Chin was appointed as a Judge of the Alameda County Superior Court. Then, in August 1990, Governor George Deukmejian elevated Chin to the position of Associate Justice of the California Court of Appeal, First District. On August 17, 1994, Governor Pete Wilson appointed Chin as the Presiding Justice of the Court of Appeal, First District, Division Three, beginning January 2, 1995. In November 1994, he was elected to a 12-year term.

On January 25, 1996, Governor Wilson appointed Chin as an associate justice of the California Supreme Court. Chin was confirmed by the Commission on Judicial Appointments and sworn in on March 1, 1996. He was retained by the electorate in 1998 and 2010. On December 16, 2014, Chief Justice Tani Cantil-Sakauye named Chin to the California Judicial Council for a two-year term.

In his first decade on the court, he authored the most majority opinions at the Supreme Court. Among Chin's notable cases is his 2008 majority opinion in Silicon Valley Taxpayers' Assn., Inc. v. Santa Clara County Open Space Authority, a landmark California separation of powers case regarding Proposition 218.

On August 31, 2020, Chin retired from the California Supreme Court. On October 5, 2020, Governor Gavin Newsom announced that his seat would be filled by Martin Jenkins.

== Civic activities ==
Chin was elected president of the Alameda County Bar Association. He served as a member of the Board of Trustees of the University of San Francisco.

== Honors and awards ==
Chin has received a series of honors from his alma mater. In 1988, he was selected as the USF Alumnus of the Year. In 1993, he was named USF Law School Alumnus of the Year. Finally, in 1996 USF Law School presented him with the St. Thomas More Award.

Chin was also awarded honorary LL.D. degrees in 1996 by Southwestern Law School, in 2001 by California Western School of Law, and in 2002 by Pepperdine University School of Law.

== Personal life ==
In 1971, Chin wed Carol Joe, a pharmacist, with whom he has two children: Jennifer (b. 1974) and Jason (b. 1976). Chin is of Chinese descent.

== See also ==
- List of Asian American jurists
- List of justices of the Supreme Court of California

== Selected publications ==
- Chin, Ming (January 2011). "Closing Argument: Liberty and Individual Responsibility: Partners in Democracy". USF Lawyer: 34.
- Chin, Ming W. (July 2010). "Judicial Independence: Under Attack Again?". Hastings Law Journal. 61 (6): 1345. (Hein paid subscription)(Lexis-Nexis paid subscription)

== Videos ==
- Appearances on C-SPAN

Legal offices
Preceded by	Associate Justice of the California Court of Appeal, First District; 1990–1995	Succeeded by
Preceded by	Presiding Justice of the California Court of Appeal, First District, Division Three; 1995–1996	Succeeded by
Preceded by Armand Arabian	Associate Justice of the Supreme Court of California; 1996–2020	Succeeded by Martin Jenkins
