= Ronald M. George =

American judge (born 1940)

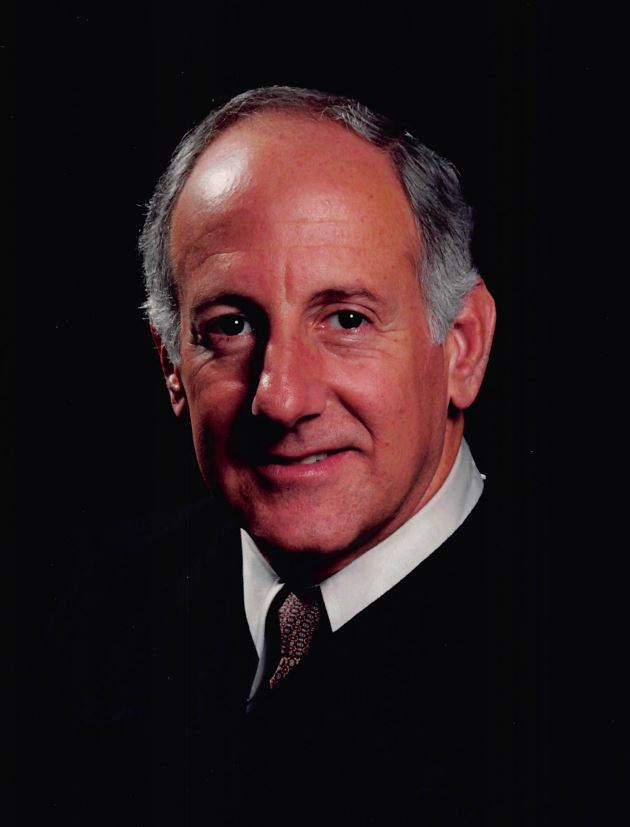

27th Chief Justice of California
- In office May 1, 1996 – January 2, 2011
- Appointed by: Pete Wilson
- Preceded by: Malcolm M. Lucas
- Succeeded by: Tani Cantil-Sakauye

Associate Justice of the Supreme Court of California
- In office September 3, 1991 – May 1, 1996
- Appointed by: Pete Wilson
- Preceded by: Allen Broussard
- Succeeded by: Janice Rogers Brown

Associate Justice of the California Court of Appeal, Second District
- In office August 27, 1987 – September 2, 1991
- Appointed by: George Deukmejian
- Preceded by: John Arguelles

Personal details
- Born: Ronald Marc George; March 11, 1940 (age 86) Los Angeles, California, U.S.
- Spouse: Barbara J. Schneiderman (m. 1966)
- Children: 3
- Education: Princeton University (BA); Stanford University (JD)

Ronald Marc George (born March 11, 1940) is an American jurist. He previously served as the 27th Chief Justice of California from 1996 to 2011. Governor Pete Wilson appointed George as an associate justice of the Supreme Court in 1991 and elevated George to Chief Justice in 1996.

== Early life and education ==
George was born in Los Angeles on March 11, 1940, and grew up in Beverly Hills, the son of a Hungarian immigrant mother and French immigrant father.

George and his sister attended the International School in Geneva, Switzerland from 1952 to 1953 and 1955–1956, where their lessons were taught in French. He graduated from Beverly Hills High School in 1957. He earned an A.B. from Princeton University in 1961 and J.D. from Stanford Law School in 1964.

== California Deputy Attorney General ==
After graduating from Stanford, George served as a Deputy Attorney General of California from 1965 to 1972.

As a Deputy Attorney General, he argued before the United States Supreme Court in Chimel v. California (1969), Hill v. California (1971), McGautha v. California (1971), and Aikens v. California (1972), representing California as an amicus curiae in support of the State of Illinois in Kirby v. Illinois.

In 1972, his final year as a Deputy Attorney General, George unsuccessfully argued before the California Supreme Court in People v. Anderson, involving the constitutionality of the death penalty.

He was successful in defending the conviction of Sirhan Sirhan for the assassination of Robert F. Kennedy

== Judicial career ==
=== Los Angeles Municipal Court ===
California Governor Ronald Reagan appointed George as a Judge of the Los Angeles Municipal Court on April 20, 1972. George was elected to a full six-year term on November 2, 1976.

=== Los Angeles County Superior Court ===
Governor Jerry Brown appointed him to the Los Angeles County Superior Court on December 23, 1977; George was elected to a full six-year term on November 7, 1978, and re-elected on November 6, 1984.

As a Superior Court judge, George presided over the trial of Hillside Strangler Angelo Buono in 1981–83. In that trial, George made the extremely unusual decision to deny the District Attorney's motion to dismiss all 10 counts of murder. The prosecutors felt their evidence against Buono was so weak that it did not justify even an attempt to win at trial, and trial judges rarely second-guess such decisions.

George reassigned the case to the California Attorney General's office, and that office successfully convicted Buono on nine of the 10 counts. Thus, it was recognized that the judge, through his action to deny the earlier motion to dismiss, had ultimately prevented a serial killer from going free. Oddly, Los Angeles County District Attorney John Van de Kamp had been elected California Attorney General during the lengthy trial, so he led both the office trying to dismiss the charges and the office that successfully won conviction.

=== California Court of Appeal ===
Governor George Deukmejian appointed him to the California Second District Court of Appeal on July 23, 1987. George was confirmed and sworn in on August 27, 1987, and was elected to a full twelve-year term on November 6, 1990.

== Supreme Court of California ==
Governor Pete Wilson appointed George as an associate justice of the California Supreme Court on July 29, 1991, and he was sworn in on September 3. California voters elected him to a full twelve-year term on November 8, 1994.

Wilson appointed George as the 27th Chief Justice of California on March 28, 1996. George was confirmed and sworn into office on May 1, 1996. He was elected to a full twelve-year term on November 3, 1998, with 75.5% percent of the vote.

=== Notable Cases ===
In 1997, Chief Justice George authored the court's opinion on American Academy of Pediatrics v. Lungren striking down a state statute requiring a minor to obtain parental consent for an abortion as an unconstitutional violation of the state constitutional right of privacy.

In 2008, Chief Justice George authored the opinion in the Supreme Court's 4–3 ruling in In re Marriage Cases legalizing same-sex marriage in California. Citing the court's 1948 decision legalizing interracial marriages, George's opinion found that sexual orientation is a protected class like race and gender, meaning that attempts to ban same-sex marriage would be subject to strict scrutiny under the Equal Protection Clause of the California Constitution. It was the first state high court in the country to do so. Voters would overturn the decision less than six months later by passing Proposition 8 in the November 2008 elections.

=== Potential U.S. Supreme Court nominee ===
George was occasionally floated as a candidate for justice of the United States Supreme Court as a conservative acceptable to Democrats, such as when Democratic United States Senator Barbara Boxer suggested George as a potential nominee for the seat on the Court vacated by Sandra Day O'Connor's retirement. Boxer described both George and his fellow California Supreme Court Justice Kathryn Werdegar, as Republicans who "reflect the spirit of Sandra Day O'Connor's tenure—independent and nonideological."

== Retirement ==
On July 14, 2010, Chief Justice George announced he would not seek to be retained in 2010 and would therefore retire at the end of his term: January 2, 2011. He was succeeded by Tani Cantil-Sakauye.

In 2013, after his retirement, he published a book of memoirs, Chief: The Quest for Justice in California, about his legal and judicial career.

== Personal life ==
On January 30, 1966, George married Barbara J. Schneiderman in Los Angeles. They have three sons: Eric, Andrew, Christopher as well as three grandchildren, Charlotte, Maya, and Kohl.

George successfully completed the Boston, New York, San Francisco, and Big Sur marathons.

== Judicial Awards and Recognitions ==
President of the California Judges Association (1982–83),

American Judicature Society's Herbert Hawley Award (1997),

St. Thomas More Law Honor Society's Medallion Award (1997),

William H. Rehnquist Award for Judicial Excellence (2002),

James Madison Freedom of Information Award of the Society of Professional Journalists (2003),

President of the Conference of Chief Justices (2003–2004),

Chair of the Board of Directors of the National Center for State Courts (2003–2004),

American Judicature Society's Opperman Award for Judicial Excellence (2006),

American Bar Association's John Marshall Award (2007),

American College of Trial Lawyers' Samuel Gates Award (2007),

Induction as Fellow of the American Academy of Arts & Sciences (2009), and Executive Order of the California Governor naming an historic two-building complex in San Francisco's Civic Center, containing judicial, executive, and legislative branch offices, as the Ronald M. George State Office Complex (2010).

Institutional structural reforms promulgated by Chief Justice George include adoption of state funding for all of the trial courts, merger of the three types of trial courts into a single trial court in each county, and the state's acquiring ownership from the counties of all of the courthouses in the state.

== See also ==
- List of justices of the Supreme Court of California

== Videos ==
- Appearances on C-SPAN

Legal offices
Preceded by Allen Broussard	Associate Justice of the California Court of Appeal, Second District; August 27, 1987 – September 2, 1991	Succeeded by
Preceded by Allen Broussard	Associate Justice of the Supreme Court of California; September 3, 1991 – May 1, 1996	Succeeded by Janice Rogers Brown
Preceded by Malcolm M. Lucas	Chief Justice of California; May 1, 1996 – January 2, 2011	Succeeded by Tani Cantil-Sakauye
