= Joyce L. Kennard =

American judge (1941–2026)

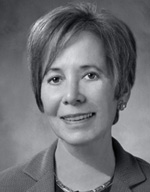

Associate Justice of the Supreme Court of California
- In office April 5, 1989 – April 5, 2014
- Appointed by: George Deukmejian
- Preceded by: John Arguelles
- Succeeded by: Leondra Kruger

Associate Justice of the California Court of Appeal, Second District, Division Five
- In office April 4, 1988 – April 5, 1989
- Appointed by: George Deukmejian

Judge of the Los Angeles County Superior Court
- In office 1987–1988

Judge of the Los Angeles Municipal Court
- In office 1986–1987

Personal details
- Born: Josephine Luther; May 6, 1941 Bandung, West Java, Dutch East Indies
- Died: August 26, 2026 (aged 85)
- Spouse: Bob Kennard (m. 1976)
- Education: Pasadena City College (AA); University of Southern California (BA, MPA, JD)

Josephine "Joyce" Luther Kennard (May 6, 1941 – August 26, 2026) was a Dutch-American judge and Associate Justice of the Supreme Court of California. Appointed by Governor George Deukmejian in 1989, she was the longest-serving justice sitting on the Court at the time of her 2014 retirement, having been retained by California's voters three times—first to fill the unexpired term in 1990, followed by second and third consecutive twelve-year terms in 1994 and 2006.

== Early life and education ==
Kennard was born in the city of Bandung in the Indonesian province of West Java on May 6, 1941, when Indonesia was still a Dutch colony. Both of her parents were of mixed Eurasian ancestry. Her father, Johan, was of Dutch, Indonesian and German ancestry, while her mother, Wilhemine, was mostly of Chinese Indonesian ancestry as well as Dutch and Belgian ancestry. Kennard spoke English with a distinct Dutch accent. During World War II, her father died in a Japanese concentration camp when she was one year old.

Kennard and her mother moved to the Netherlands in 1955. The rigidity of the Dutch educational system meant that Kennard's hopes of attending university were derailed when she contracted a tumor on her right leg, which resulted in the amputation of part of that limb at age 16. She subsequently had to walk with the help of a prosthesis.

In 1961, she was able to immigrate to the United States as a result of a special law that authorized 15,000 additional visas for Dutch Indonesian refugees. She settled in Los Angeles and found her first U.S. job as a secretary for Occidental Life Insurance. Wilhemine, who was stuck in a menial restaurant job, stayed behind so that her daughter would always have a home, but died of lung cancer in 1968.

Wilhemine's last gift to her daughter was a bequest of $5,000 she had carefully saved up over the years. This money, on top of Kennard's own savings (and additional income from continuing to work part-time while in school), enabled Kennard to finally pursue her long-deferred dream of going to college. In 1970, she received an A.A. from Pasadena City College. In 1971, she graduated with a Bachelor of Arts with Phi Beta Kappa and magna cum laude honors in German from the University of Southern California. She continued her studies at USC, where she would go on to graduate in 1974 with both a Master of Public Administration from USC Price School of Public Policy and a Juris Doctor from the USC Gould School of Law.

== Legal and judicial career ==
In December 1974, Kennard was admitted to the State Bar of California, and from 1975 to 1979 she practiced as a Deputy Attorney General with the California Department of Justice. She then became a Senior Attorney for Associate Justice Edwin F. Beach of the California Court of Appeal, Second District, in Los Angeles.

Kennard's rise within the California courts is often described as "meteoric." Appointed to the Los Angeles Municipal Court in 1986, Kennard was elevated to the Los Angeles County Superior Court in 1987. The next year, she was elevated again to the California Court of Appeal, Second District, Division Five. Finally, in 1989, Governor George Deukmejian appointed her to the California Supreme Court. Upon taking her oath, Kennard became the second woman and the first Asian American to serve as a justice of the Court. In November 1994, she was retained by the voters in the election.

During her time on the bench, Kennard has authored numerous high-profile opinions, the best-known of which is Kasky v. Nike (2002) In that case, the California Supreme Court held that Nike could not claim a First Amendment "commercial free speech" defense when charged with lying about sweatshop conditions in its overseas manufacturing plants. The U.S. Supreme Court granted certiorari, but ultimately the Court declined to render an opinion, instead letting the California Supreme Court's decision stand. Harvard Professor Laurence Tribe, who had criticized the California Supreme Court's decision, represented Nike.

In the 1993 case of Johnson v. Calvert, which revolved around surrogate's rights and what constitutes the "natural mother" of a child, Kennard was the only woman and dissenter in a 6-1 decision to enforce the surrogate's contract when she wrote "A pregnant woman is more than a mere container or breeding animal; she is the conscious agent of creation no less than the genetic mother, and her humanity implicated on a deep level. Her role should not be devalued."

Kennard had a reputation for aggressive questioning during oral argument. She did not hesitate to ask long and complicated questions—often speaking for minutes at a time before prompting an attorney to respond, and often asked the first question in a given case.

On April 5, 2014, Kennard retired from the court after 25 years of service.

== Personal life and death ==
In 1976, Joyce Kennard married Bob Kennard. She died on August 26, 2026, at the age of 85.

== See also ==
- List of Asian American jurists

== Videos ==
- Appearances on C-SPAN

== See also ==
- List of justices of the Supreme Court of California

Legal offices
| Preceded by John Arguelles | Associate Justice of the Supreme Court of California; 1989–2014 | Succeeded by Leondra Kruger |
| Preceded by | Associate Justice of the California Court of Appeal, Second District, Division Five; 1988–1989 | Succeeded by |
