= Stanley Mosk =

American jurist (1912– 2001)

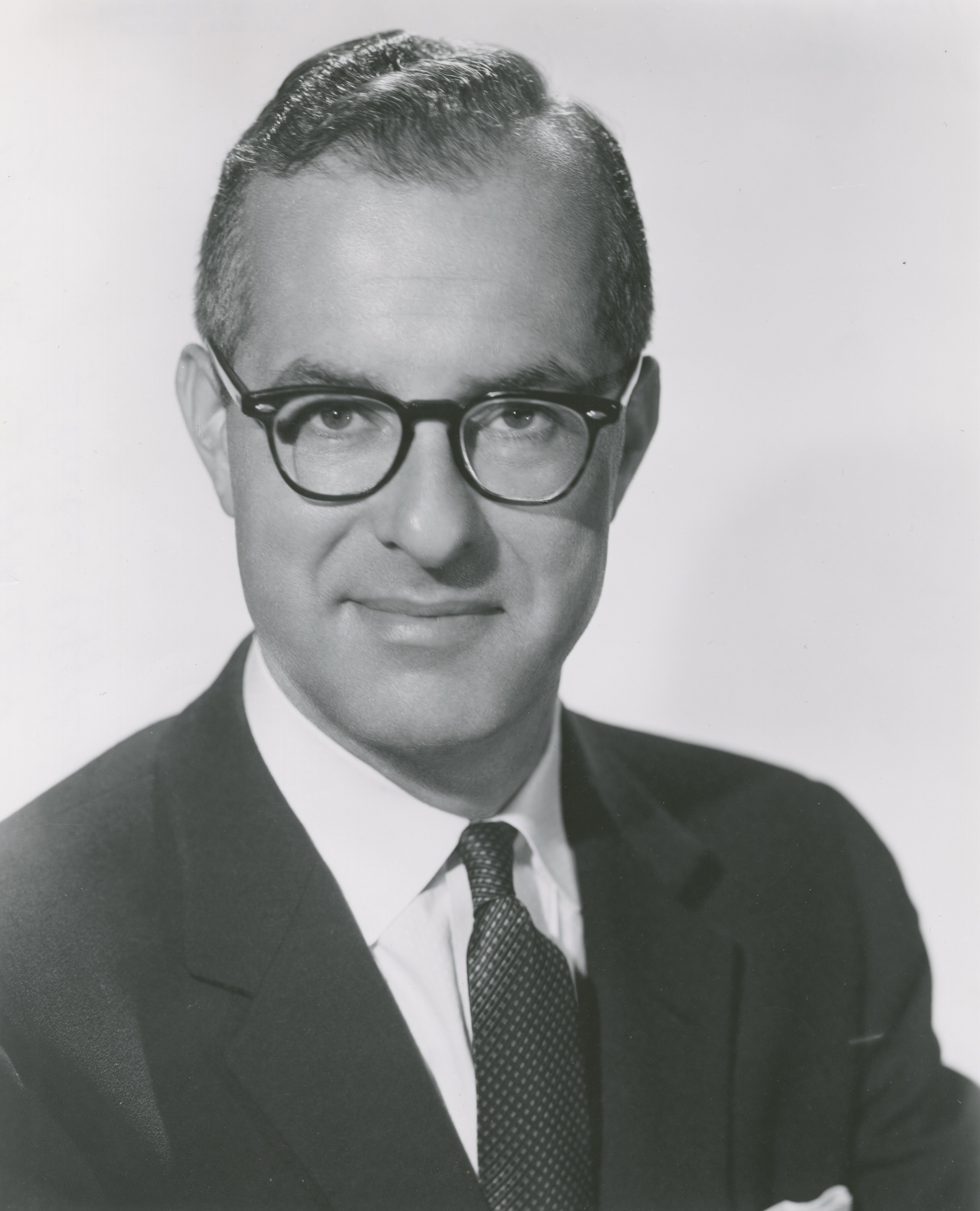
- Mosk c. 1957

Associate Justice of the California Supreme Court
- In office September 1, 1964 – June 19, 2001
- Appointed by: Pat Brown
- Preceded by: Roger J. Traynor
- Succeeded by: Carlos R. Moreno

24th Attorney General of California
- In office January 5, 1959 – August 31, 1964
- Governor: Pat Brown
- Preceded by: Pat Brown
- Succeeded by: Thomas C. Lynch

Judge of the Los Angeles County Superior Court
- In office January 6, 1943 – January 5, 1959
- Appointed by: Culbert Olson

Personal details
- Born: Morey Stanley Mosk; September 4, 1912 San Antonio, Texas, U.S.
- Died: June 19, 2001 (aged 88) San Francisco, California, U.S.
- Party: Democratic
- Spouses: Helen Edna Mitchell (m. 1936; died 1981) Susan Jane Hines (m. 1982; div. 1995) Kaygey Kash (m. 1995)
- Children: Richard M. Mosk
- Education: University of Chicago (BA); Southwestern Law School (LLB)

Military service
- Allegiance: United States
- Branch/service: United States Army
- Years of service: 1945
- Rank: Private
- Battles/wars: World War II

Morey Stanley Mosk (September 4, 1912 – June 19, 2001) was an American jurist, politician, and attorney. He served as Associate Justice of the California Supreme Court for 37 years (1964–2001), the longest tenure in that court's history.

Before sitting on the Supreme Court, he served as Attorney General of California and as a trial court judge.

== Early life and career ==
Mosk was born in San Antonio, Texas. His family moved to Rockford, Illinois when he was three years old. His parents Paul and Minna (née Perl) Mosk were Reform Jews (of Hungarian and German origin, respectively) who did not believe in strict religious observances. Since Rockford sits next to the Wisconsin border, Mosk's parents followed Wisconsin politics and were strong supporters of Progressive Wisconsin Senator Robert M. La Follette.

Mosk's life was strongly affected by the Great Depression. Mosk graduated from the University of Chicago in 1933 with a bachelor's degree in philosophy. Because his father's business in Rockford was floundering, his parents and brother relocated to Los Angeles, and Mosk followed them after graduating from college, as they could not afford to support him in further studies in Chicago.

At the time, it was possible to use the last year of a bachelor's degree as the first year of a three-year law degree program, so while living with his parents, Mosk was able to obtain a law degree in two years. He earned a LL.B from Southwestern Law School in 1935 and was admitted to the bar that same year. Mosk opened a solo practice, sharing an office with four other separate solo practices. During those difficult years, Mosk was a general practitioner who took whatever walked in the door.

== Entry to politics ==
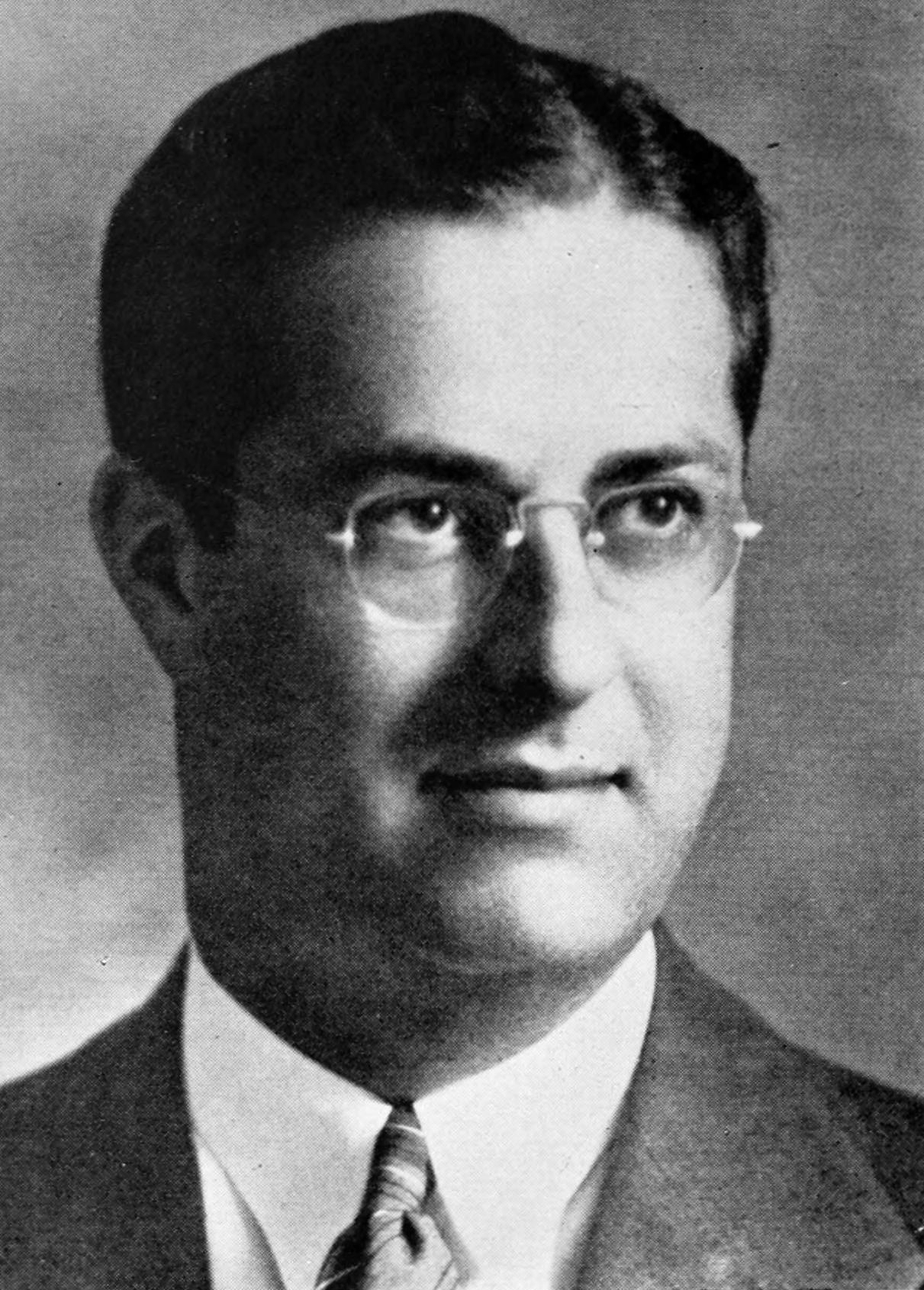
Mosk as executive secretary to governor Culbert Olson, 1940

Mosk first became involved in politics in 1934, when he cast his first vote for Socialist-turned-Democrat Upton Sinclair for governor. Mosk later remarked that Sinclair's End Poverty in California campaign was "the acorn from which evolved the tree of whatever liberalism we have in California." While practicing law, Mosk occasionally assisted Democratic state senator Culbert Olson. In 1938, Olson was elected governor of California and Mosk was hired as Olson's executive secretary the next year.

After Olson lost the 1942 election to Republican Earl Warren, Olson made a lame-duck appointment of Mosk to the Los Angeles County Superior Court. At the age of 30, Mosk became the youngest Superior Court judge in the state. He faced opposition at his first retention election but prevailed.

In March 1945, Mosk left the Superior Court to volunteer for service in the U.S. Army during World War II as a private, but spent most of the war in a transportation unit in New Orleans and never went abroad. After an honorable discharge in September 1945, he returned to California and resumed his judicial career.

In 1947, as a Superior Court judge, he declared the enforcement of restrictive racial covenants unconstitutional before the Supreme Court of the United States did so in Shelley v. Kraemer.

== Attorney General of California ==
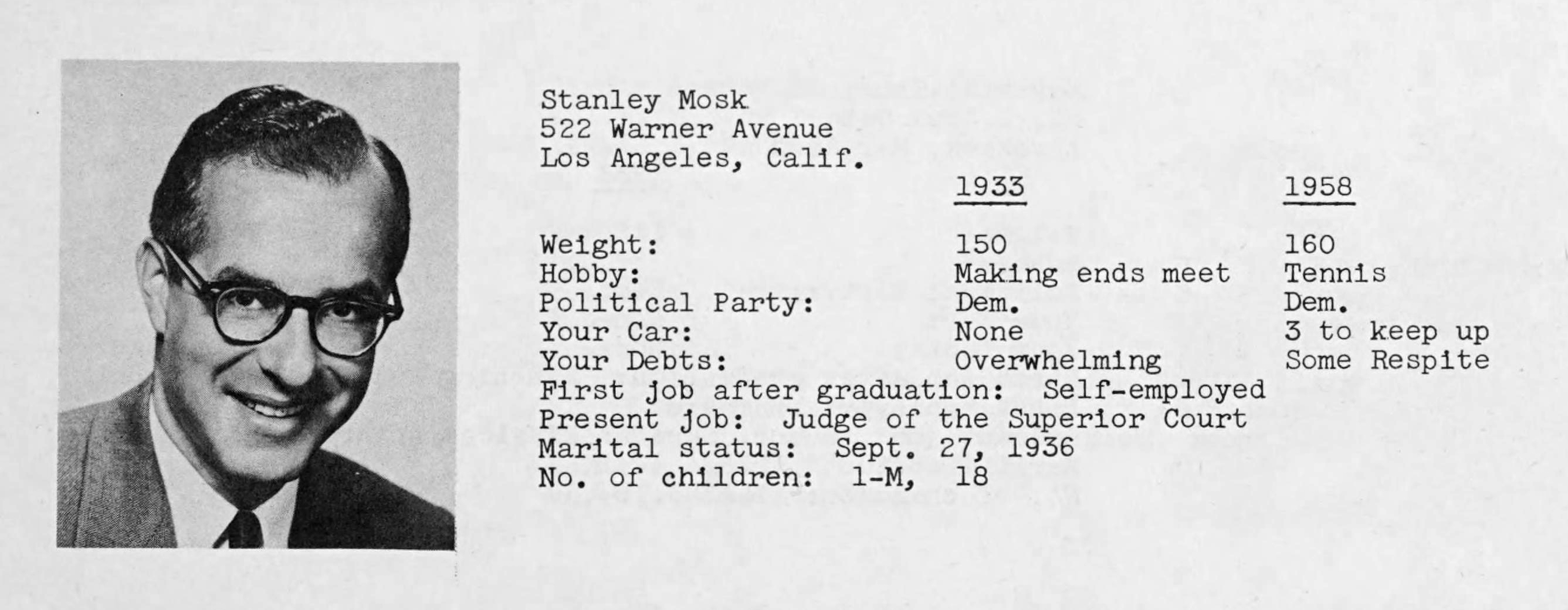
Mosk in the Re-Cap and Gown (a yearbook for the University of Chicago's class of 1933, who could not afford to produce one at the time), 1958

In 1958, Mosk was elected Attorney General of California by the largest margin of any contested election in the state that year. Upon his inauguration in 1959, Mosk became the first Jew to serve as a statewide executive branch officer in California. In 1962, he was re-elected by a large margin.

As Attorney General, Mosk issued approximately two thousand written opinions, handled a series of landmark cases, and on January 8, 1962, appeared before the U.S. Supreme Court in Arizona v. California.

Mosk established the Attorney General's Civil Rights Division and successfully fought to force the Professional Golfers' Association of America to amend its bylaws denying access to minority golfers. He also established Consumer Rights, Constitutional Rights, and Antitrust divisions. As California's chief law enforcement officer, he sponsored legislation creating the California Commission on Peace Officers' Standards and Training.

Mosk also commissioned a study of the resurgence of right-wing extremism in California, which famously characterized the secretive John Birch Society as a "cadre" of "wealthy businessmen, retired military officers and little old ladies in tennis shoes."

He served as the California National Committeeman to the Democratic National Committee and was an early supporter of John F. Kennedy for president. He remained close to the Kennedy family.

== California Supreme Court ==
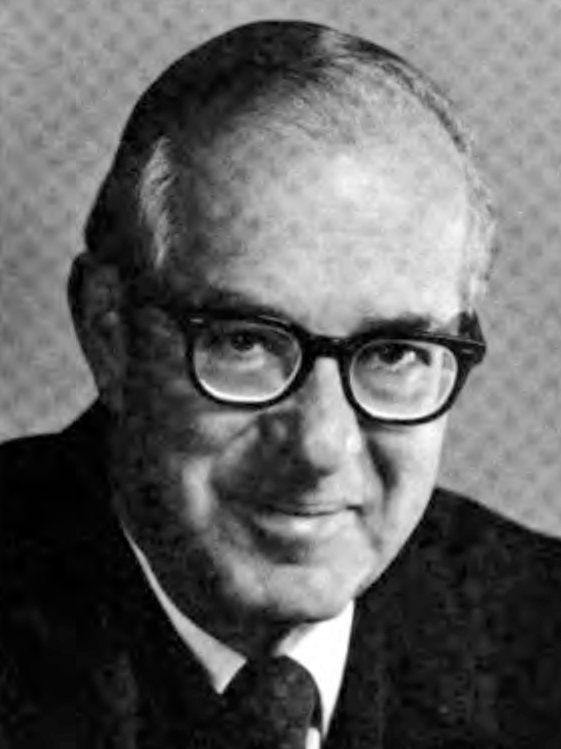
Mosk as associate justice, 1975

While an early favorite to be elected to the United States Senate after the death of incumbent Clair Engle, Mosk was appointed to the California Supreme Court in September 1964 by Governor Pat Brown to succeed Roger J. Traynor, who had been elevated to chief justice. Mosk was retained by the electorate in 1964 and re-elected to three twelve-year terms beginning in 1974.

Although Mosk was a self-described liberal, he often displayed an independent streak that sometimes surprised his admirers and critics alike. For example, in Bakke v. Regents of the University of California, Mosk ruled that the minority admissions program at the University of California, Davis violated the Equal Protection Clause of the U.S. Constitution. This decision was affirmed by the U.S. Supreme Court in Regents of the University of California v. Bakke, 438 U.S. 265 (1978), which, unlike Mosk's opinion, held that race could be factored in admissions to promote ethnic diversity. The U.S. Supreme Court agreed with Mosk in rejecting racial quotas. He also voted to uphold the constitutionality of a parental consent for abortion law — a law ultimately struck down by a majority of the court.

Despite his liberalism, he was not a close ally of controversial Chief Justice Rose Bird. He won reelection in 1986 with 75% of the vote while Bird and two other justices closely allied with her were defeated for reelection. In November 1998, at age 86, Mosk was retained by the electorate for another twelve-year term.

Although personally opposed to the death penalty, Mosk voted to uphold death penalty convictions on a number of occasions. He believed he was obligated to enforce laws properly enacted by the people of the state of California, even though he personally did not approve of such laws. A typical example of how Mosk articulated his beliefs is his concurrence in In re Anderson, 69 Cal. 2d 613 (1968):

In my years as Attorney General of California (1959–1964), I frequently repeated a personal belief in the social invalidity of the death penalty ... Naturally, therefore, I am tempted by the invitation of petitioners to join in judicially terminating this anachronistic penalty. However, to yield to my predilections would be to act wilfully "in the sense of enforcing individual views instead of speaking humbly as the voice of law by which society presumably consents to be ruled...." [Citation omitted.]

As a judge, I am bound to the law as I find it to be and not as I might fervently wish it to be.

Mosk served on the high court until his death in 2001, having surpassed Justice John W. Shenk to become the longest-serving justice in the history of the Court in 1999. As of 2021, Mosk is the last Justice of the California Supreme Court to have served in non-judicial elected office before his appointment to the bench.

== Personal life ==
Mosk married three times. On September 27, 1936, he married Helen Edna Mitchell in Beverly Hills, California, and they had one son, Richard. After her death on May 22, 1981, he remarried on August 27, 1982, to Susan Jane Hines in Reno, Nevada, who was more than 30 years his junior. They divorced and on January 15, 1995, Mosk married Kaygey Kash, a long-time friend.

His son, Richard M. Mosk, became an attorney and justice of the California Court of Appeal, Second District.

== Legacy ==
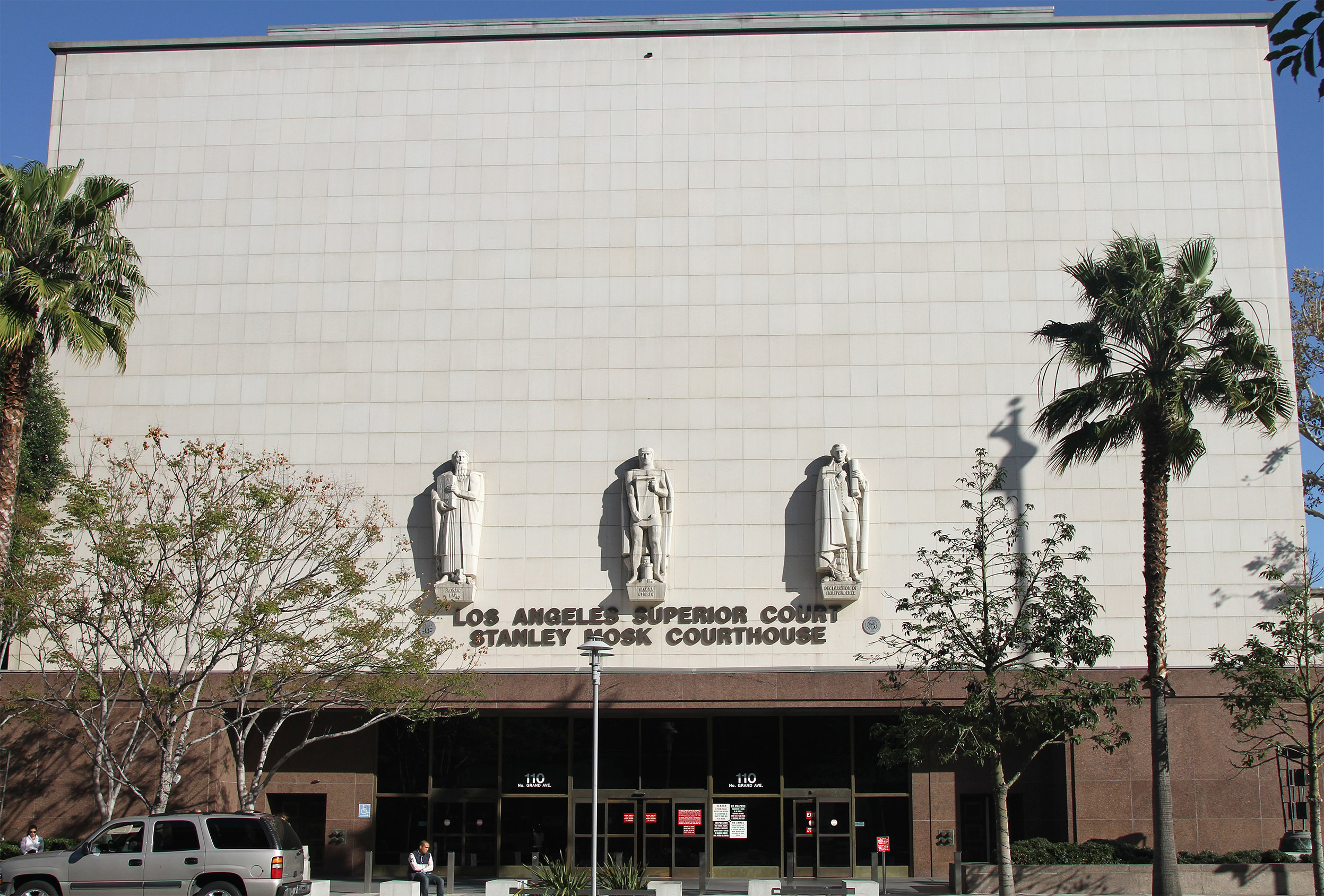
Stanley Mosk Courthouse, Grand Avenue entrance

In 1999, Albany Law School Professor Vincent Martin Bonventre described Mosk as "an institution, an icon, a trailblazer, a legal scholar, a constitutional guardian, a veritable living legend of the American judiciary, ... one of the most influential members in the history of one of the most influential tribunals in the western world."

One of Mosk's contributions to jurisprudence was development of the constitutional doctrine of independent state grounds. This is the concept that individual rights are not dependent solely on interpretation of the U.S. Constitution by the U.S. Supreme Court and other federal courts, but also can be found in state constitutions, which often provide greater protection for individuals.

=== Honors and memorials ===
The Stanley Mosk Courthouse, housing the Los Angeles County Superior Court, is named after him. It is located at 111 North Hill Street in Los Angeles.

The Stanley Mosk Library & Courts Building is located on the Capitol Mall in Sacramento, California and is the home of the California Court of Appeal for the Third District.

== Selected publications ==
=== Books ===
- Mosk, Stanley (1995). Democracy in America—Day by Day. New York: Vantage Press. ISBN 0533112044.

=== Articles ===
- Mosk, Stanley (1997). "Brennan Lecture: States' Rights—and Wrongs". N.Y.U. L. Rev. 72 (3): 552–566.
- Mosk, Stanley (1993). "Nothing Succeeds Like Excess". Loy. L.A. L. Rev. 26 (4): 981.
- Mosk, Stanley (1991). "Gideon Kanner". Loy. L.A. L. Rev. 24 (3): 516.

== See also ==
- List of Jewish American jurists
- List of justices of the Supreme Court of California

Legal offices
Preceded by Pat Brown	Attorney General of California; 1959–1964	Succeeded by Thomas C. Lynch
Preceded by Roger J. Traynor	Associate Justice of the Supreme Court of California; 1964–2001	Succeeded by Carlos R. Moreno
