= Kaus =

Kaus or KAUS may refer to:

== Stars ==
- Three stars in the constellation Sagittarius:
  - Kaus Borealis (Lambda Sagittarii)
  - Kaus Media (Delta Sagittarii)
  - Kaus Australis (Epsilon Sagittarii)

== Radio stations ==
- KAUS (AM), an American radio station
- KAUS-FM, an American radio station

== Other uses ==
- Kaus (surname)
- Qos (deity), national god of the Edomites
- Kaus-malaka, king of Edom during the reign of the Assyrian king Tiglath-Pileser III
- Austin–Bergstrom International Airport, Texas, United States (by ICAO airport code)
  - Robert Mueller Municipal Airport, Austin, Texas, United States formerly used ICAO code KAUS prior to its reassignment to Austin–Bergstrom International Airport

== See also ==
- Kauss
- Caus (disambiguation)
- Kos (disambiguation)
- Kaykaus (disambiguation)
