= Kaus (surname) =

Family name

Kaus is a German language surname. Such as the related Kauss it either belongs to the group of family names derived from a given names – in this case from several compound names of Germanic origin with the element gōʐ "Goth" (e. g. Goswin, Gosbert, Gosbald or Gauzbert) – or may be a variant of the habitational name Kues (from Late Latin covis "field barn", "rack"). Notable people with the name include:

- Bill Kaus (1923–2006), Australian politician
- Gina Kaus (1893–1985), Austrian-American novelist and screenwriter
- Jan Kaus (born 1971), Estonian writer
- Max Kaus (1891–1977), German expressionist painter
- Mickey Kaus (born 1951), American journalist, pundit and author
- Otto Kaus (1920–1996), American lawyer and judge
- Stephen Kaus (born 1948), American journalist
- Aaron Reid Kaus (born 1974), Canadian Registered Massage Therapist
