= Zerby =

Zerby may refer to

- Zerby Derby, a British-Canadian live-action television preschool series
- Harold Zerby (1902–1963), American football player
- Karen Zerby (born 1946), leader of The Family International, and American religious movement
- Kim Darby (born Deborah Zerby in 1947), American actress
- Shooting of Douglas Zerby in Long Beach, California in 2010
