= Lionel Wilson (politician) =

American politician

Lionel Joseph Wilson
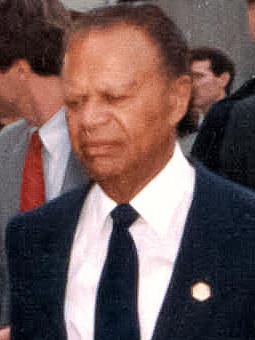

45th Mayor of Oakland
- In office January 3, 1977 – January 3, 1991
- Preceded by: John H. Reading
- Succeeded by: Elihu M. Harris

Personal details
- Born: March 14, 1915 New Orleans, Louisiana, U.S.
- Died: January 23, 1998 (aged 82) Oakland, California, U.S.
- Party: Democratic
- Spouse(s): Gloria Towns (m. 1942) Dorothy P. McGuinness (m. 1950)
- Education: University of California, Berkeley (BA); University of California, Hastings College of the Law; (LLB)
- Profession: Politician

Military service
- Allegiance: United States
- Branch/service: United States Army
- Years of service: 1943-1946
- Rank: Sergeant
- Battles/wars: World War II

Lionel Joseph Wilson (March 14, 1915 – January 23, 1998) was an American political figure and a member of the Democratic Party. He was the first Black mayor of Oakland, California, serving three terms as mayor of Oakland from 1977 until 1991.

== Biography ==
Born March 14, 1915, Wilson was the eldest of eight children of Louise Barrios and Julius Wilson in New Orleans, Louisiana. By 1920, the family had moved to Oakland, California, where his father worked as a plasterer in building construction. Wilson was educated in the public schools, and in 1932 graduated from McClymonds High School.

Wilson attended UC Berkeley, graduating with an A.B. in economics in 1939. During 1939 to 1943, he was a semi-professional baseball player, pitching for the Oakland Larks club as part of the short-lived West Coast Negro Baseball League. On January 4, 1943, during World War II he enlisted in the U.S. Army, rising to the rank of Sergeant. After his discharge, he continued his studies at University of California, Hastings College of the Law, receiving his LL.B. in 1949. In January 1950, he was admitted to the State Bar of California and began a private practice with George Vaughns.

In 1953 and 1955, Wilson ran for the Berkeley City Council. He then formed the law firm Wilson, Metoyer & Sweeney (later joined by Allen Broussard). In 1961, Governor Pat Brown appointed Wilson a judge of the Alameda County Municipal Court (becoming the first African American judge in California), and then in 1964 Brown elevated Wilson to serve as a judge of the Alameda County Superior Court. In 1962, he joined the Metropolitan Oakland YMCA's Board of Directors.

In 1977, Wilson won the election for mayor of Oakland, defeating Oakland school board president, Dave Tucker. While mayor, Wilson addressed development in downtown Oakland, including extension of Bay Area Rapid Transit to the city, and one natural disaster: the 1989 Loma Prieta earthquake. He lost the 1990 mayoral election to Elihu Harris after making an expensive and unsuccessful bid to return the then Los Angeles Raiders to Oakland.

In 1991, Wilson nominated himself to serve on the Oakland Board of Port Commissioners, being appointed by the Oakland City Council after losing his mayoral bid. He served on the port commission for a year, working under his appointee and then-President Carole Ward Allen of the board of port commissioners. Elihu Harris had him removed from the port in 1992.

Wilson was a member of Alpha Phi Alpha fraternity. He, along with Allen Broussard, was also part of the coterie that used to gather at the pharmacy of William Byron Rumford, another important African American in Northern California politics.

Lionel Wilson died on January 23, 1998, of cancer; he was 82.

== Honors and legacy ==
The office building at 150 Frank H. Ogawa Plaza, called the Broadway Building (formerly the First National Bank Building), is named in his honor. In 2002, Aspire Public Schools founded a small 6-12 grade school called "Lionel Wilson College Preparatory Academy" in Oakland. Also, at Oakland International Airport, Terminal 2, which houses Southwest Airlines and their airplane flights, is named the "Lionel J. Wilson Terminal."

== Personal life ==
Wilson married twice. With his first wife, Gloria, he had three sons: Steve, and twins Robin and Lionel. On August 12, 1950, he remarried to Dorothy P. McGuinness in Los Angeles. His brothers include Harold, Kermit, Julius and Warren Barrios Wilson, who was also an attorney in Oakland.

== See also ==
- List of first African-American mayors
- African American mayors in California
- Allen Broussard
- Carole Ward Allen
- Wiley Manuel
- Janice Rogers Brown

Political offices
Preceded by John H. Reading	Mayor of Oakland, California; 1977–1991	Succeeded by Elihu Harris
