= Jeffrey Ehrlich =

American lawyer and author

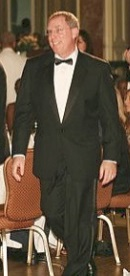
- Born: Jeffrey Isaac Ehrlich; July 10, 1959 (age 66)
- Education: Harvard Law School
- Occupation: Lawyer
- Known for: Civil appeals
- Website: The Ehrlich Law Firm

Jeffrey Isaac Ehrlich (born July 10, 1959) is an American lawyer and author, known for handling landmark appeals in the United States Supreme Court and the California Supreme Court. He is co-author of the influential Thomson Reuters treatise on insurance litigation, and editor-in-chief of Advocate, the most widely circulated trial-bar magazine in the United States. He and his son, Clinton Ehrlich, are also known for exonerating Sgt. Raymond Lee Jennings, an Iraq War veteran who served 11 years of a life sentence for murdering teenager Michelle O'Keefe.

== Education and early career ==
In 1983, Ehrlich graduated with honors from Harvard Law School. After graduating, he clerked for the Hon. Judith Nelsen Keep, Chief Judge of the United States District Court for the Southern District of California.

In 1985, he was admitted to practice law in California and joined the Los Angeles law firm of Hufstedler, Miller, Carlson & Beadsle. As a young associate at the firm, he was trained by Otto Kaus, a retired California Supreme Court justice, and Shirley Hufstedler, a retired judge for the Ninth Circuit Court of Appeal and the United States' first Secretary of Education. Ehrlich also worked closely with two partners at the firm, Dennis Perluss, and Laurie Zelon, who now sit as justices on the California Court of Appeal.

In 1992, Ehrlich was hired by the Legal Division of the Federal Deposit Insurance Corporation to work as an appellate attorney in the agency's headquarters in Washington, D.C. He spent four years representing the agency before federal appellate courts.

== Landmark cases ==
After returning to private practice, Ehrlich successfully argued in 1999 the case of UNUM Life Insurance Co. v. Ward 119 S.Ct. 1380, before the United States Supreme Court. The Court held that the federal Employee Retirement Income Security Act of 1974 did not bar application of a California rule forbidding insurance companies from denying untimely claims without showing that they had been prejudiced by the delayed notice. The decision garnered attention from the insurance industry because it expanded the rights of millions of Americans who obtain insurance through their employers.

In 2006, Ehrlich founded The Ehrlich Law Firm. He argued Wilson v. 21st Century Insurance Co., in which the California Supreme Court limited insurance companies' ability to evade liability for bad-faith conduct by claiming their wrongful denial of coverage was the result of a "genuine dispute."

In Brown, Winfield, & Canzoneri, Inc. v. Superior Court, he successfully defended a controversial procedural shortcut known as a suggestive Palma notice. Opposition counsel in the case described the California Supreme Court's 4-3 decision as "earth shattering."

In Minkler v. Safeco Insurance Company of America, Ehrlich persuaded the California Supreme Court to part with the majority of courts in the United States by holding that the so-called "severability clause" in an insurance policy renders ambiguous exclusions for the intentional acts of "an" insured. Other attorneys described Minkler as important because it broadened coverage under homeowners policies to include many claims that previously would not have been covered.

In Cabral v. Ralphs Grocery Company, Ehrlich persuaded the California Supreme Court that the employer of a trucker who illegally parked alongside a freeway could be held partially responsible for a fatal accident that occurred when another driver lost control and crashed into the tractor trailer. The decision ended a growing trend of judges dismissing negligence suits rather than letting juries determine whether the defendant was responsible. Critics contend that the decision unreasonably expanded the potential for liability to the point that there is now "no safe place to park in California."

In November 2011, Ehrlich argued an asbestos products-liability case, O'Neil v. Crane, before the California Supreme Court. He contended that World War II-era valve and pump manufacturers knew their products contained asbestos at delivery, and therefore had a duty to warn future users who were exposed to replacement asbestos. The California Supreme Court went on to unanimously reject Ehrlich's argument, in a major national victory for the defense bar.

Ehrlich represented the family of Douglas Zerby in their high-profile wrongful-death lawsuit against the Long Beach Police Department. Zerby was shot to death by officers while sitting on a friend's porch, holding a hose nozzle. On February 4, 2016, the Ninth Circuit affirmed a $6.5 million award in favor of Zerby's family.

In April 2016, Ehrlich argued Nickerson v. Stonebridge, a California Supreme Court case with "significant financial consequences" for the insurance industry. Ehrlich contends that the Due Process Clause of the United States Constitution permits punitive damages against insurers to be increased in proportion to damages awarded after trial.

In 2016, Ehrlich will appear before the California Supreme Court to defend a $90 million class-action judgment on behalf of security guards who contend that their employers denied them legally mandated rest breaks. The justices on the Court of Appeal previously rejected Ehrlich's argument that employers may not require workers to perform any duties during rest breaks.

== Legal author and editor ==
Ehrlich is the editor-in-chief of Advocate, the most widely circulated trial-bar magazine in the United States, and he publishes articles in the magazine critiquing recent legal decisions He has also contributed numerous articles to other legal periodicals, including the Los Angeles Daily Journal.

Ehrlich serves on the board of governors for the Consumer Attorneys Association of Los Angeles, and claims to have been hired as appellate counsel by thirteen of the organization's "Trial Lawyers of the Year."

Ehrlich is co-author of the Thomson Reuters treatise on Insurance Litigation, which is frequently cited by California appellate courts as non-binding legal authorities.
