= Peter E. Kaus =

Austrian-born American physicist

- Born: Peter Edward Kaus; October 9, 1924; Vienna, Austria
- Died: November 6, 2016 (aged 92)}
- Education: University of California, Riverside
- Occupation: Physicist
- Parent: Gina Kaus (mother)
- Relatives: Otto Kaus (brother); Mickey Kaus (nephew); Stephen Kaus (nephew)

Peter Edward Kaus (October 9, 1924 – November 6, 2016) was an Austrian-born American physicist.

== Early life and career ==
Kaus was born in Vienna, the son of Otto Sr. and Gina Kaus, a novelist and screenwriter. He attended the Schottengymnasium until 1938. He was the brother of Otto Kaus, an associate justice of the Supreme Court of California. He and his family emigrated to France, settling in Paris, and then emigrated to the United States, settling in Hollywood, California. He attended Hollywood High School, graduating in 1940. After graduating, he attended the University of California, Los Angeles (UCLA), but his education was interrupted when he enlisted in the armed forces during World War II. After his discharge, he returned to UCLA, and earned his PhD degree in physics in 1954, which after earning his degree, he moved to Princeton, New Jersey, and then moved to Riverside, California in 1963.

Kaus served as a professor in the department of physics at the University of California, Riverside from 1967 to 1994. During his years as a professor, in 1969, he was named a fellow of the American Physical Society, and in 1986, he was named an honorary trustee of the Aspen Center for Physics.

== Personal life and death ==
Kaus was married to Eva Lewy, and they had three daughters. Their marriage lasted until Kaus's death in 2026.

Kaus died at his home on November 6, 2016, at the age of 92.
