= John Houlihan =

John Houlihan may refer to:

- John C. Houlihan (1910–1986), mayor of Oakland, California
- John J. Houlihan (1923–2003), American politician and businessman in Illinois
