= California Fair Employment Practices Act =

The California Fair Employment Practices Act (FEPA) was a statute passed and enacted in 1959 that barred businesses and labor unions from discriminating against employees or job applicants based on their color, national origin, ancestry, religion, or race. Prior to being repealed and reenacted under the California Fair Employment and Housing Act in 1980 the law was codified under part 4.5 of the Labor Code.

The FEPA as well as similar legislation passed earlier in other states (notably New York and New Jersey) drew its inspiration from the Fair Employment Practices Commission (FEPC) set up by the federal government during World War II. Upon the disbandment of the FEPC in 1945, California assemblymen Augustus F. Hawkins and William Byron Rumford (both members of the California Democratic Party) led the effort to pass fair employment legislation in the state. Hawkins drafted the initial legislative proposal in 1945, but would alternate with Rumford in introducing a fair employment bill during each succeeding session from 1945 to 1959. The bill that was passed and signed into law by Governor Pat Brown in 1959 was authored by Augustus F. Hawkins.

In 1946, a fair employment practices measure that would have created a statewide commission to enforce the proposed provisions appeared on the ballot as Proposition 11, but was decisively defeated. From that point onward, supporters of a statewide fair employment practices commission focused their efforts on getting a bill passed in the California State Legislature. Nevertheless, the bills introduced by assemblymen Augustus F. Hawkins and Byron Rumford failed to gain traction until the emergence of the California Committee for Fair Employment Practices in 1954. It brought together a coalition of religious, community, civil rights, and labor groups to exert popular pressure on legislators. During this time period California was also undergoing a general shift in political attitudes that would have far-reaching ramifications for the future of fair employment legislation.

1959 marked a turning point in California state politics with the Democratic Party beginning a period of electoral dominance over the California Republican Party in California State Legislature races. With Pat Brown elected Governor of California in 1958 it also marked the first time since 1883 that the Democrats had control over both chambers of the legislature and the state executive office. With this new political power the Democrats were able to secure the passage of Hawkins' proposal through the legislature by April of that year. Governor Pat Brown signed the FEPA into law on April 16, 1959 and it became effective a few months later on September 18, 1959.

In a press release summarizing some of the statute's main provisions, Hawkins wrote that the FEPA "creates as a new division in the Department of Industrial Relations a State Fair Employment Practices Commission of five members. Powers of the Commission include receiving, investigating, hearing and passing on complaints involving discrimination. It has the power to issue orders to eliminate discrimination if found to exist." He also specified in the same release that "subject employers are those employing five or more persons."

In 1970, the Fair Employment Practices Act was amended to include a protection against gender discrimination.
