= Consumer Attorneys Association of Los Angeles =

The Consumer Attorneys Association of Los Angeles (CAALA), previously the Los Angeles Trial Lawyers Association (LATLA), is one of the largest associations of plaintiffs lawyers in the United States. Although CAALA refers to itself as a local association, it has almost 3,000 members and is larger than all but six state trial-bar associations. CAALA's annual Las Vegas convention is the largest gathering of plaintiffs lawyers in the United States and its magazine, The Advocate, is the most widely circulated trial-bar publication in the country.

CAALA has been influential in promoting legislation to protect consumer rights. But the association has also been fiercely criticized by tort-reform organizations and medical associations.

== Events and awards ==
Since its inception in 1949, CAALA has held an annual installation and awards dinner in Beverly Hills. At the event, CAALA recognizes its "Trial Lawyer of the Year," "Appellate Lawyer of the Year," "Trial Judge of the Year," and "Appellate Justice of the Year." In recent years, the awards presentation has been attended by numerous members of the judiciary and state government; for example, the 2010 event included 50 judges and justices. The first African American to be honored as CAALA's "Trial Lawyer of the Year," was Johnnie Cochran, who received the award in 1990. In 2008, Jeffrey Ehrlich became the first ever two-time recipient of CAALA's "Appellate Lawyer of the Year" award, having previously received the award in 2004.

Since 1982, CAALA has held an annual convention in Las Vegas, which features lectures from high-profile plaintiffs lawyers, as well as defense counsel and judges. Today, the convention attracts thousands of attendees from across the United States. In 2008, when incoming California Senate President Pro Tem, Darrell Steinberg raised eyebrows by spending over a thousand dollars for a one-night stay at the Mandalay Bay Resort and Casino, it turned out that the trip had been a fundraising expedition to the CAALA convention.

CAALA has recently begun a campaign to use billboards throughout Los Angeles to build public awareness of the good that the organization contends consumer lawyers do for society.

== Controversy ==
In 1985, when a telephone hotline opened up to warn doctors about litigious patients, CAALA retaliated by creating a hotline that patients could call to see whether their doctor had been sued for malpractice during the prior 10 years. The Los Angeles County Medical Association called the CAALA hotline "a sham and a shame, a miscarriage and a corruption of justice." CAALA claimed the hotline would increase business for doctors with good records by steering patients away from the small minority of doctors who are responsible for most malpractice claims.

In 1994, in a move with national repercussions, the organization became the first trial-bar association to change its name to avoid use of the phrase "trial lawyers." It claimed that the switch from "Los Angeles Trial Lawyers Association" to "Consumers Attorneys Association of Los Angeles" was carried out after the organization commissioned a survey that showed 70% of the public associated the phrase "trial lawyer" with criminal-defense attorneys. Tort-reform advocates accused CAALA of adopting its new name in an attempt to confuse voters and conceal that the organization's members are largely personal-injury lawyers who file lawsuits in order to obtain large contingency fees. When California's state trial-bar association followed CAALA's lead and adopted a "consumer attorney" moniker, tort-reform groups accused both organizations of "consumer fraud" and said the trial lawyers' attempt to hide within the pro-consumer movement was "obvious and repulsive."

In 1995, tort-reform groups claimed that CAALA had given hundreds of thousands of dollars to a consumer activist in order to buy his public opposition to tort-reform initiatives. The supporters of the initiatives asserted that CAALA had a "stranglehold on consumers" and that the organization relied on facially neutral pro-consumer groups to do its "dirty work." CAALA's supporters contended that the organizations making those accusations were themselves funded by the insurance industry.

In 1996, CAALA publicly attacked ABC's John Stossel for representing himself as a consumer reporter despite having received hundreds of thousands of dollars from corporate interest groups. It claimed that the so-called "Loser Pays" system that Stossel advocated as a way of decreasing litigation would actually deprive ordinary Americans of access to the civil justice system, by forcing them to risk financial ruin if they attempted to hold corporations responsible in court.
