= UC Law Journal =

- Discipline: Law
- Language: English

Publication details
- Former name: Hastings Law Journal
- History: 1949–present
- Publisher: University of California, College of the Law, San Francisco (United States)
- Frequency: 6/year

Standard abbreviations
- Bluebook: UC L.J.
- ISO 4: UC Law J.

Indexing
- ISSN: 0017-8322
- LCCN: 97660967
- OCLC no.: 976849183

Links
- Journal homepage; Online access; HeinOnline

The UC Law Journal is the flagship law journal at the University of California, College of the Law, San Francisco (formerly University of California, Hastings College of the Law). It began in 1949 in San Francisco, California as the Hastings Law Journal and is the oldest law review at the school.

In 2022, the journal became part of the newly announced Justice Wiley W. Manuel Center for Scholarly Publications, named after UC Law alumnus and former California Supreme Court Justice Wiley W. Manuel.

The Journal publishes six issues per volume in December, January, March, May, June, and August. The Journal also hosts an annual symposium featuring speakers from around the country presenting on varied topics of interest to the legal community. One issue per volume is dedicated to articles related to the Symposium.

Washington & Lee ranked UC Law Journal at number 31 in 2011.

== Articles cited in the U.S. Supreme Court ==
A 1987 article was cited in the recent Supreme Court Case of American Needle Inc. v. National Football League. The article, Conflicts of Interest and Fiduciary Duties in the Operation of a Joint Venture was written by Professor Zenichi Shishido of Japan. The famous Fourth Amendment case, Terry v. Ohio, cites a note, Stop and Frisk Law in California, by then-student Harvey E. Henderson, Jr.

Several other articles published by the UC Law Journal have been cited by the United States Supreme Court:

- Bostock v. Clayton County, Georgia, 140 S.Ct. 1731 (2020), citing Rhonda R. Rivera, "Our Strait-Laced Judges: The Legal Position of Homosexual Persons in the United States," 30 Hastings L.J. 799 (1979).
- Oil States Energy Services, LLC v. Greene’s Energy Group, LLC, 138 S.Ct. 1365 (2018), citing Adam Mossoff, "Rethinking the Development of Patents: An Intellectual History," 52 Hastings L.J. 1255 (2001).
- Rosales-Mireles v. United States, 138 S.Ct. 1897 (2018), citing Rebecca Hollander–Blumoff, "The Psychology of Procedural Justice in the Federal Courts," 63 Hastings L.J. 127 (2011).

== Notable alumni ==
- Associate Justice of California Supreme Court Carol A. Corrigan
- Chief Justice of Montana Supreme Court Karla M. Gray
- First African American California Supreme Court Justice Wiley Manuel (Editor in Chief of the 1953 volume)
- U.S. Ambassador J. Christopher Stevens

== Faculty advisors ==
- Justice Roger Traynor
