= Clifford E. Rishell =

American politician

42nd Mayor of Oakland
- In office July 1, 1949 – July 1, 1961
- Preceded by: Joseph E. Smith
- Succeeded by: John C. Houlihan

Member of the Oakland City Council from District 6
- In office 1949–1951
- Preceded by: James D'Arcy
- Succeeded by: Paul W. Hiesey

Personal details
- Born: October 10, 1890 Glenwood, Iowa
- Died: January 14, 1971 (aged 80) Santa Barbara, California
- Party: Republican

Clifford E. Rishell (October 10, 1890 – January 14, 1971) was an American politician who served as the Mayor of Oakland from 1949 to 1961.

== Mayoralty ==
Rishell was elected to the 6th district seat on the Oakland City Council in 1949. That same year, he was appointed by his fellow councilors to serve as mayor. At the time, the council appointed one of its own members to serve as the city's mayor for two-year terms.

Oakland transitioned back to a directly-elected mayoralty. In 1953, Rishell was elected to remain mayor in the first direct election. He was re-elected in 1953 and 1957; and served as mayor until 1961, when he was unseated by John C. Houlihan.

As mayor, Rishell worked to promote the city. He attracted events to the city, such as the American Bowling Association's national tournament, and by promoting other sports events held in the city (such as roller derby).

Aspiring to grow the city's own airport, Rishell filed a formal complaint with federal officials alleging that airlines had unlawfully discriminated against Oakland's airport with their preference for flying at San Francisco's airport on the other side of the San Francisco Bay.

After his 1961 re-election defeat, Rishell unsuccessfully ran for an at-large seat on the City Council in 1963.

== Electoral history ==
1949 Oakland City Council district 6 election
Candidate	Votes	%
Clifford E. Rishell	33,556	
Albert H. Braga	13,686	
Helene Conde	11,655	
Total votes		100

1953 Oakland mayoral election
Candidate	Votes	%
Clifford E. Rishell (incumbent)	40,014	
Lester M. Grant	16,689	
G. R. Auguston	8,373	
Thorvald "Cap" Brown	5,632	
James M. Leaver	4,645	
Lillian Kiezel	2,107	
Total votes		100

1957 Oakland mayoral election
Candidate	Votes	%
Clifford E. Rishell (incumbent)	42,724	
Benjain F. Marlowe	29,765	
Total votes		100

1961 Oakland mayoral election
Candidate	Votes	%
John C. Houlihan	53,340	
Clifford E. Rishell (incumbent)	36,423	
Total votes		100

1963 Oakland Councilman At-Large election
Candidate	General election		Runoff election	
Candidate	Votes	%	Votes	%
Dan Marovich	31,796		53,553	
Clifford E. Rishell	22,270		26,603	
Robert Bertschinger	9,807			
Hector "Reno" Reyna	5,262			
Paul Montauk	2,786			
Total		100		100
