= UC Law Constitutional Quarterly =

- Discipline: Constitutional law
- Language: English
- Edited by: Richelle Gernan

Publication details
- Former name: Hastings Constitutional Law Quarterly
- History: 1973–present
- Publisher: O'Brien Center for Scholarly Publications, University of California College of the Law, San Francisco (United States)
- Frequency: Quarterly

Standard abbreviations
- Bluebook: UC L. Const. Q.
- ISO 4: UC Law Const. Q.

Indexing
- ISSN: 0094-5617
- LCCN: 74645519
- OCLC no.: 01606931

Links
- Journal homepage; Online archive

The UC Law Constitutional Quarterly is a quarterly law review covering constitutional law edited by students of the University of California College of the Law, San Francisco. While most articles focus on issues arising under the United States Constitution, the journal also covers topics concerning state and foreign constitutions. Established in 1973, it is the oldest law journal in the United States devoted exclusively to constitutional issues. It was titled the Hastings Constitutional Law Quarterly from its founding until 2023.

== Notable articles ==
=== Citations in the United States Supreme Court ===
- Dennis Baron, Corpus Evidence Illuminates the Meaning of Bear Arms, 46 HASTINGS CONST. L.Q. 509 (2019). Cited in the dissenting opinion authored by Justice Breyer, joined by Justices Sotomayor and Kagan, in N.Y. State Rifle & Pistol Association v. Bruen, 597 U.S. 1 (2022).
- Arthur D. Hellman, The Proposed Intercircuit Tribunal: Do We Need It? Will It Work?, 11 HASTINGS CONST. L.Q. 375 (1984). Cited in the dissenting opinion authored by Justice Stevens, joined by Justices Brennan and Marshall, in California v. Carney, 471 U.S. 386 (1985).
- Leo Kanowitz, Deciding Federal Law Issues in Civil Proceedings: State Versus Federal Trial Courts, 3 HASTINGS CONST. L.Q. 141 (1976). Cited in the concurring opinion authored by Justice Blackmun in Trainor v. Hernandez, 431 U.S. 434 (1977).
- Douglas W. Kmiec & John O. McGinnis, The Contract Clause: A Return to the Original Understanding, 14 HASTINGS CONST. L.Q. 525 (1987). Cited in the dissenting opinion authored by Justice Gorsuch in Sveen v. Melin, 584 U.S. 811 (2018), and cited by Judge Posner in Chrysler Corporation v. Kolosso Auto Sales, 148 F.3d 892 (7th Cir. 1998).
- Ethan J. Leib, Supermajoritarianism and the American Criminal Jury, 33 HASTINGS CONST. L.Q. 141 (2006). Cited in the dissenting opinion authored by Justice Alito, joined by Chief Justice Roberts and Justice Kagan, in Ramos v. Louisiana, 590 U.S. 83 (2020).
- Daniel Hays Lowenstein & Robert M. Stern, The First Amendment and Paid Initiative Petition Circulators, 17 HASTINGS CONST. L.Q. 175 (1989). Cited in the dissenting opinion authored by Chief Justice Rehnquist in Buckley v. American Constitutional Law Foundation, 525 U.S. 182 (1999).
- Daniel R. Mandelker, Land Use Takings: The Compensation Issue, 8 HASTINGS CONST. L.Q. 491 (1981). Cited in the dissenting opinion authored by Justice Stevens, joined by Justices Blackmun and O'Connor, in First English Evangelical Lutheran Church v. County of Los Angeles, 482 U.S. 304 (1987).
- Robert J. Martineau, The Supreme Court and State Regulation of the Legal Profession, 8 HASTINGS CONST. L.Q. 199 (1981). Cited in Justice Brennan's opinion for the Court in Frazier v. Heebe, 482 U.S. 641 (1987).
- Robert J. Reinstein, An Early View of Executive Powers and Privilege: The Trial of Smith and Ogden, 2 HASTINGS CONST. L.Q. 309 (1975). Cited in the dissenting opinion authored by Justice Alito in United States v. Texas, 599 U.S. 670 (2023).
- David Shelledy, Autonomy, Debate, and Corporate Speech, 18 HASTINGS CONST. L.Q. 541 (1991). Cited in the dissenting opinion authored by Justice Stevens, joined by Justices Ginsburg, Breyer, and Sotomayor, in Citizens United v. FEC, 558 U.S. 310 (2010).
- Peter W. Sperlich & Martin Jaspovice, Grand Juries, Grand Jurors and the Constitution, 1 HASTINGS CONST. L.Q. 63 (1974). Cited in Justice Blackmun's opinion for the Court in Castaneda v. Partida, 430 U.S. 482 (1977).
- Marcy Strauss, Reinterrogation, 22 HASTINGS CONST. L.Q. 359 (1995). Cited in the concurring opinion authored by Justice Stevens in Maryland v. Shatzer, 559 U.S. 98 (2010).
- Roland E. Walker, Jr., One Man-One Vote: In Pursuit of an Elusive Ideal, 3 HASTINGS CONST. L.Q. 453 (1976). Cited in the concurring opinion authored by Justice Stevens in Karcher v. Daggett, 462 U.S. 725 (1983).
- Joseph P. Zammit, Reflections on Shaffer v. Heitner, 5 HASTINGS CONST. L.Q. 15 (1978). Cited in the concurring opinion authored by Justice White in Burnham v. Superior Court of California, 495 U.S. 604 (1990).

=== Citations in Other Courts and Court Submissions ===
- Joseph R. Grodin, Rediscovering the State Constitutional Right to Happiness and Safety, 25 HASTINGS CONST. L.Q. 1 (1997). Cited by the Supreme Courts of California, Iowa and New Mexico.
- Jamila Jefferson-Jones, Airbnb and the Housing Segment of the Modern 'Sharing Economy': Are Short-Term Rental Restrictions an Unconstitutional Taking? 42 HASTINGS CONST. L.Q. 557 (2015). Cited by the Supreme Court of New York.
- Neal Kumar Katyal, The Promise and Precondition of Educational Autonomy, 31 HASTINGS CONST. L.Q. 1 (1997). Cited by Howard University School of Law Civil Rights Clinic as Amicus Curiae.
- Julie M. Spanbauer, The First Amendment Right to Petition Government for a Redress of Grievances: Cut from a Different Cloth, 21 HASTINGS CONST. L.Q. 15 (1993). Cited by the American Civil Liberties Union and American Association for Justice in Amici Curiae briefs.

== Notable authors ==
The CQ has published scholarship and commentary from state and federal judges, including Supreme Court justices, as well as leading US and international scholars.

=== Judges and Justices ===
- Shirley Abrahamson
- Tom C. Clark
- Carol Corrigan
- Arthur Goldberg
- Shirley Hufstedler
- William Rehnquist
- Mathew Tobriner
- J. Skelly Wright

=== Scholars and Commentators ===
- Henry J. Abraham
- David Adamany
- Matthew Adler
- Lawrence A. Alexander
- Vikram Amar
- William J. Bennett
- Raoul Berger
- Mitchell N. Berman
- Charles L. Black, Jr.
- Evan Caminker
- Erwin Chemerinsky
- Jesse Choper
- Saul Cornell
- Richard Delgado
- Richard L. Hasen
- Paul W. Kahn
- Pamela Karlan
- Neal Katyal
- Douglas Kmiec
- Sanford Levinson
- Anthony Lewis
- Hans Linde
- Louis Lusky
- John McGinnis
- Edward McWhinney
- Thomas W. Merrill
- Charles Ogletree
- O. Hood Phillips
- Martin Redish
- Norman Spaulding
- Jean Stefancic
- Julius Stone
- William Van Alstyne
- George Winterton
