= The Wife Takes a Flyer =

1942 film by Richard Wallace

- Film poster
- Directed by: Richard Wallace
- Written by: Jay Dratler; Gina Kaus (story & screenplay); Harry Segall (additional dialogue)
- Produced by: B.P. Schulberg
- Starring: Joan Bennett; Franchot Tone
- Cinematography: Franz Planer
- Edited by: Gene Havlick
- Music by: Werner R. Heymann
- Production company: Columbia Pictures
- Distributed by: Columbia Pictures
- Release date: April 28, 1942
- Running time: 86 minutes
- Country: United States
- Language: English

The Wife Takes a Flyer (aka Highly Irregular, UK title: A Yank in Dutch) is a 1942 romantic comedy film made by Columbia Pictures, directed by Richard Wallace. The film stars Joan Bennett and Franchot Tone. The screenplay of The Wife Takes a Flyer was written by Jay Dratler, Gina Kaus and Harry Segall. The film's music score is by Werner R. Heymann. (Note: The Wife Takes a Flyer opens with the following written prologue: "The resemblance of our characters to any Nazi military figures is intentional and is not coincidental and is done with premeditation and extreme malice aforethought. Somewhere in Holland...")

== Plot ==
At Nazi headquarters in occupied Holland, Major Zellfritz assigned to find a downed British pilot, becomes sidetracked by Anita Woverman. He demands that the Wovermans billet him and his men at her house. Upstairs, the butler, Jan, is hiding the escaped pilot, Christopher Reynolds.

When a group of stormtroopers arrives, Mrs. Woverman learns of Reynolds' presence, but claims he is her son Hendrik. She runs a home for spinsters in the area while her husband is institutionalized as mad. Reynolds decides to protect Anita from Zellfritz's amorous advances.

An arrangement to meet a contact at the Savoy Café requires Reynolds to ask Anita to cover for him. At the café, Reynolds contacts Gustav, a waiter, who delivers a message in a sandwich. A suspicious Nazi officer details several soldiers to follow him. Reynolds slips the document to Anita. Zellfritz, still trying to romance Anita, brags about his relative who is "high up" in the U-boat fleet.

Still being carefully watched, Reynolds meets another stranger on the street. Keith, the new contact, provides him with the identity papers of a beer truck driver. An Allied agent with a shortwave radio is operating in the area, and Reynolds arranges to meet him later that night.

At home, Anita is still dealing with Zellfritz, but finds Reynolds waiting for her. She tells him that the major's relative will complete his mission in Eselmunder at a submarine fleet there. At the agent's house several Gestapo officers have been arrested the agent, Reynolds escapes and goes back to Anita's house.

Anita says the major drops propaganda leaflets nightly over England. The spinsters offer their help in transcribing the location of the submarine site onto the pamphlets. That night, as Anita entertains Zellfritz in her room, the spinsters alter the pamphlets, but are interrupted by Hendrik, Anita's real husband, at the door. Hendrik is on the run and asks Reynolds for help in evading the Nazis. Reynolds gives Hendrik his forged identification card.

After the pamphlets are safely stuffed back into the major's bag, Reynolds bursts into Anita's room, claiming that the Gestapo are after him. Zellfritz thinking he is helping Anita's son, agrees to help him escape, but first he has a mission at the airport.

Reynolds is arrested for desecrating a poster of Hitler. At the court, the spinsters set off an air raid alarm and, in the chaos, Reynolds spies the major's car. After knocking Zellfritz unconscious, Reynolds puts on the major's uniform and speeds away to a waiting aircraft with the pamphlets in hand.

Then Anita, Reynolds and her friend, the Countess Oldenburg, fly away to freedom, leaving the major behind, dressed only in his underwear.

== Cast ==
- Joan Bennett as Anita Woverman
- Franchot Tone as Christopher Reynolds
- Allyn Joslyn as Major Zellfritz
- Cecil Cunningham as Countess Oldenburg
- Roger Clark as Keith
- Lloyd Corrigan as Thomas Woverman
- Lyle Latell as Muller
- Georgia Caine as Mrs. Woverman
- Barbara Brown as Maria Woverman
- Erskine Sanford as Jan
- Chester Clute as Adolph Bietjelboer
- Hans Conried as Hendrik Woverman
- Romaine Callender as Zanten
- Aubrey Mather as Chief Justice
- William Edmunds as Gustav
- Gordon Richards as Major Wilson
- Lyle Latell as Muller

== Production ==
Principal photography on The Wife Takes a Flyer took place from January 5 to February 20, 1942. A Lockheed Model 18 Lodestar was used to depict a German aircraft. The filming locations included the Lockheed Air Terminal, Burbank, California and Litchfield Naval Air Station, Phoenix, Arizona.

== Reception ==
Bosley Crowther, in his contemporary review for The New York Times, said: "Some one has said that we Americans will have come to a perilous pass when we can no longer laugh at our enemies—which, in one sense, may be true. But certainly the sort of laughter which Columbia's "The Wife Takes a Flyer" limply woos is a token neither of wit nor a healthy respect for the foe. So, if you find the picture un-amusing, do not fear for the nation's state. This painfully labored comedy, which came to the Capitol yesterday, is just a cheap and artificial lot of slapstick in which the Nazis are broadly burlesqued and the people of occupied Holland are represented as so many actors in a Columbia farce."
