= Jami Floyd =

American broadcast journalist (born 1964)

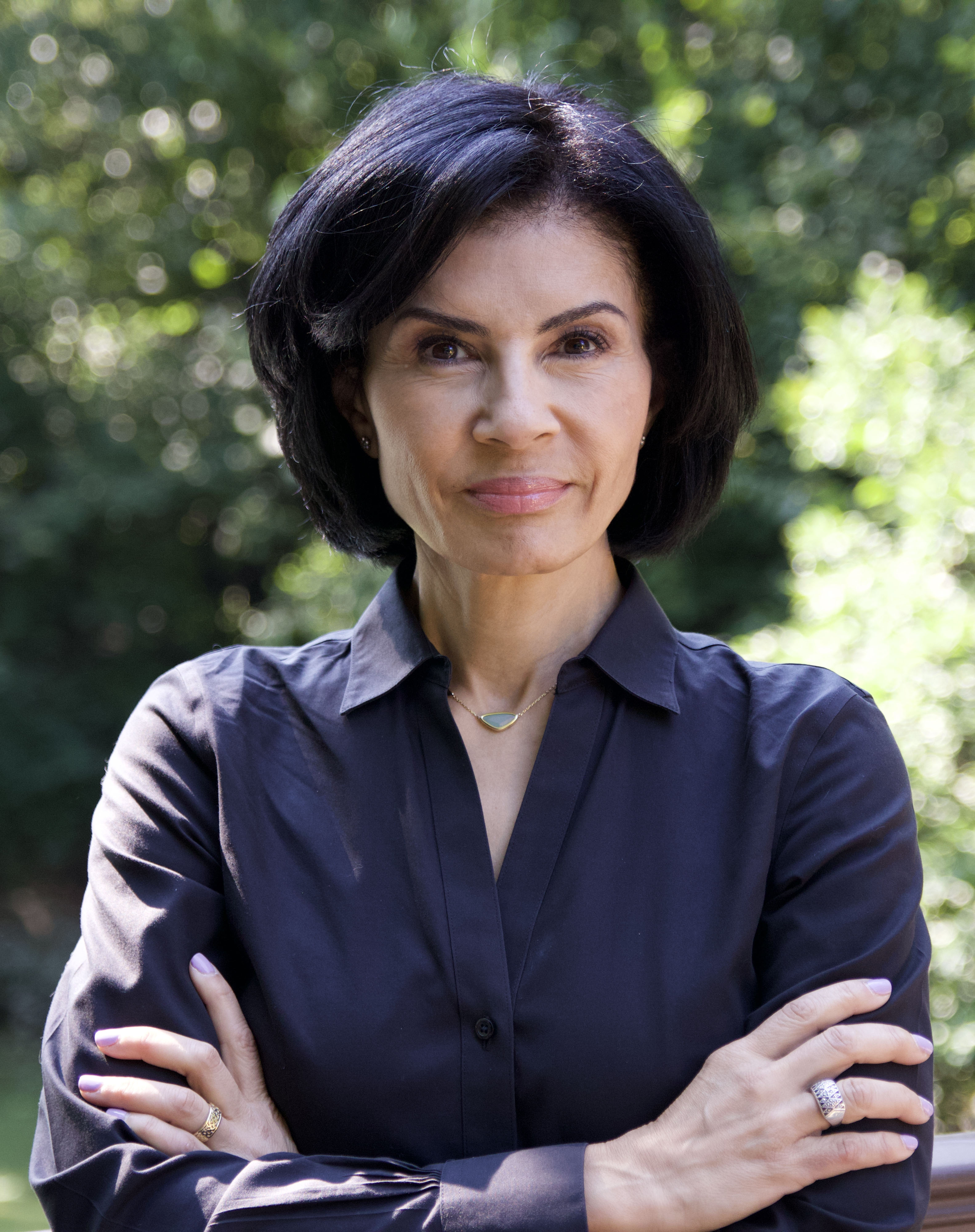
- Floyd in 2021
- Born: September 10, 1964 (age 62); New York City, New York, U.S.
- Education: Binghamton University (BA); University of California, Berkeley (JD); Stanford University (LLM)
- Political party: Democratic
- Spouse: Kurt Flehinger
- Children: 2

Jami Floyd (born September 10, 1964) is an American attorney, journalist, network news anchor, legal and political analyst, and former White House Fellow. She is a former legal analyst at ABC News and MSNBC, Legal Contributor to Al Jazeera America, and the former host of "All Things Considered" at WNYC Radio. She serves on Manhattan Community Board 7 as a chair of the Public Safety Committee and is the author of a forthcoming book, “Dream Interrupted,” about Thurgood Marshall.

== Early life and education ==
Floyd was born at Mount Sinai Hospital in East Harlem, Manhattan on September 10, 1964, and raised in New York City. Floyd is multiracial, born to a black father and a white mother. Her father was an artist, general contractor and later became an architectural engineer. Her family lived in Mitchell-Lama housing on the Lower East Side.

While at Binghamton University as an undergraduate, Floyd worked as a disc jockey at WHRW. Floyd graduated in 1986 with a B.A. in political science and a concentration in Journalism. In 1989, she attended and graduated with honors from the UC Berkeley School of Law, University of California, Berkeley, where she had been an associate editor of the law review. She received a Master of Laws degree in 1996 from Stanford Law School, Stanford University, where she also worked as a teaching fellow.

== Career ==
=== Law ===
Floyd began working as an attorney in the California Supreme Court as a law clerk to Associate Justice Allen E. Broussard.

She began practice in civil and criminal law when she entered the law firm Morrison & Foerster. She left the firm in 1993 to join the San Francisco Public Defender office, where she worked as a trial attorney.

=== Media career ===
Floyd's first television broadcasting job was as a reporter and legal analyst for KPIX Radio and TV in San Francisco. She spent time in Los Angeles covering the murder trial of O. J. Simpson and the nationwide response to his acquittal. In 1995, she briefly joined CBS News as a legal analyst before moving to New York City to help launch the cable outlet Court TV as an anchor and correspondent.

In 1997, she joined ABC News, where she worked as a news correspondent for World News Tonight with Peter Jennings. She has also reported for Good Morning America and Nightline and has both co-anchored Early Morning News Now with Anderson Cooper and led the Consumer Unit for 20/20. Beginning in 1999, she led the Law and Justice Unit with Terry Moran and John Miller.

On September 11, 2001, Floyd was dispatched by ABC News to cover the terrorist attacks. Reflecting on her reporting in the days and weeks that followed for the 9/11 Tribute Center, Floyd later said, "As a journalist you make your decision. You are going to fulfill your obligation to your viewers, readers, listeners... You cannot have a democracy without journalism."

In February 2005, Floyd returned to Court TV to launch her own series, Jami Floyd: Best Defense, on which guests offered their spin on legal and political stories as well as coverage of major trials.

In April 2005, Floyd discussed her then-Court TV colleague Nancy Grace with the Los Angeles Times. Floyd said she disagreed with some of Grace's on-air commentary but found her personally likable. She also expressed concern about what she viewed as Grace's tendency toward a "rush to judgment" and said that other guests frequently imitated Grace's style. In September 2005, Floyd discussed Grace again in Elle, comparing her appeal to that of Oprah Winfrey and describing Grace as an "Everywoman" figure.

In 2008, Floyd began appearing on Fox News in the early days of the Obama Administration, most often on Bill O'Reilly's prime time program, The O'Reilly Factor. In August 2009, a segment she appeared on went viral when she sparred with O'Reilly over the CIA interrogation of terror suspects after 9/11.

In 2010, when Court TV folded, she joined MSNBC as a legal and political analyst.

In 2012 she hosted TED Talks in NYC on NYC Media. In 2013 she joined the newly launching Al Jazeera America based in New York City. She left the network to host All Things Considered on WNYC, based in New York City.

From 2016 to 2018, she was a legal editor and contributor to More Perfect, hosted by JAD Abumrad.

In 2021, she teamed up with Abumrad again for the six part series, The Vanishing of Harry Pace

From 2010 to 2022, Floyd co-hosted, with WNYC's Brian Lehrer, an annual Martin Luther King Jr. Day celebration at the Apollo Theater. Together they moderated panels, introduced live music performances, hosted spiritual leaders and engaged in conversation with a full theater from Harlem on the topic of social justice and Dr. King's vision for America.

Through 2022, she served as a legal analyst on the PBS News Hour as well as the Senior Editor at New York Public Radio

==== Retracted articles and resignation from WNYC ====
In November 2021, four articles authored by Floyd that were published on the WNYC news site Gothamist between March and October 2021 were retracted for use of unattributed language from other publications. In a statement, Ms. Floyd acknowledged "mistakes," saying they were "never intentional or designed to deceive anyone."

In March 2022, Floyd contracted to write a book about Thurgood Marshall and resigned from WNYC to pursue her book deal

On Monday, April 4, 2022, several news outlets reported that Floyd had been accused of plagiarism in 45 articles going back to 2010, reports Floyd denied.

On February 9, 2023, Floyd filed suit in federal court against WNYC and its parent company, New York Public Radio, for race discrimination, retaliation, and hostile work environment. WNYC tried to dismiss the lawsuit but, in April 2024, the judge found enough facts for the case to move forward. In October 2024, Floyd and WNYC settled the lawsuit for an undisclosed amount.

== Political career ==
=== White House Fellow ===
Floyd was selected to serve in the Clinton Administration as a White House Fellow and moved to Washington, D.C. In 1993 she was assigned first to the office of First Lady Hillary Clinton, where she assisted in the Clinton Administration's effort to pass comprehensive Health Care legislation, and later to the staff of Vice President Al Gore, where she worked on the Brady Handgun Violence Prevention Act, the Violent Crime Control and Law Enforcement Act, and various other domestic policy initiatives. She also helped to vet judicial nominees and worked as a speech writer for the Vice President.

=== US House of Representatives race ===
In October 2025, Floyd announced her candidacy for New York's 12th Congressional District, after incumbent Jerry Nadler announced he was retiring earlier that year. She withdrew from the race in February 2026.

== Awards and honors ==
Floyd has won more than a dozen awards, including the duPont Award, Gracie Award, the Telly Award, and the National Association of Black Journalists Salute to Excellence Award and the RTNDA Unity Award. She has been nominated twice for an Emmy Award. In 2016, she was a consultant producer on Ezra Edelman's Academy Award winning documentary, O.J: Made in America.

In August 2015, she was named a Public Scholar by the New York Council for the Humanities, for a two-year term, fall 2015 to fall 2017.

== Personal life ==
Floyd married criminal defense and civil rights attorney Kurt Flehinger, and they have two children together. In 1996, Floyd moved to New York's Upper West Side, where the family has since resided.
