= Otto Kaus =

American judge

Otto Michael Kaus

Associate Justice of the Supreme Court of California
- In office July 22, 1981 – October 1985
- Appointed by: Jerry Brown
- Preceded by: Wiley W. Manuel
- Succeeded by: Edward A. Panelli

Presiding Justice of the California Court of Appeal, Second District, Division Five
- In office December 16, 1966 – July 21, 1981
- Appointed by: Pat Brown

Associate Justice of the California Court of Appeal, Second District, Division Three
- In office December 28, 1964 – December 16, 1966
- Appointed by: Pat Brown

Personal details
- Born: Otto Michael Kaus; January 7, 1920 Vienna, Austria
- Died: January 11, 1996 (aged 76) Beverly Hills, California, U.S.
- Spouse: Peggy Alice Kaus (m. 1943)
- Children: Mickey; Stephen
- Parent: Gina Kaus (mother)
- Relatives: Peter E. Kaus (brother)
- Education: University of California, Los Angeles (BA); Loyola Marymount University (LLB)

Otto Michael Kaus (January 7, 1920 – January 11, 1996) was an Austrian-born lawyer and judge from the State of California.

== Early life and education ==
Kaus was born in Vienna, Austria, as the first child of the writers Otto F. Kaus and Regina Weiner. He was already attending school in Great Britain when the rest of his family fled the Nazis in the 1930s. Immigrating to the United States in 1940, his family settled in Los Angeles, California. He graduated from the University of California at Los Angeles in 1942 with a B.A., and then joined the U.S. Army, where he served until 1945. Following his discharge, he graduated from Loyola Law School in 1949, and was admitted to the state bar that year. He then joined the law firm of Chase, Rotchford, Downen & Drukker, where he practiced for 11 years and became a partner.

== Judicial and legal career ==
In December 1961, Kaus was appointed as a judge on the Los Angeles County Superior Court by California Governor Pat Brown and, on December 28, 1964, Brown elevated Kaus to the California Court of Appeal, Second District, where he served until 1981. On the appellate court, Kaus served as an associate justice of Division Three until December 16, 1966, and then as Presiding Justice of Division Five until July 21, 1981.

In July 1981, Kaus was chosen to serve as Associate Justice of the California Supreme Court by Governor Jerry Brown, whose father had appointed Kaus to his previous post. He was confirmed with little trouble. In 1982, Kaus was on the ballot for retention by the voters, along with fellow justices Cruz Reynoso and Allen Broussard. However, the state Supreme Court had become controversial due to the growing perception by many that Brown's appointees, particularly Chief Justice Rose Bird, were liberal ideologues whose rulings were political. Although Kaus was considered the least ideological and most independent of Brown's appointees, he was reconfirmed by 57 percent of the voters, far less than expected, after a campaign was waged against Brown's appointees that year.

While on the bench, his notable cases include his concurring opinion in National Audubon Society v. Superior Court (1983), concerning the conflict between the public trust doctrine and appropriative water rights. In 1984, he wrote the opinion for a unanimous court in People v. Bledsoe that rape trauma syndrome is inadmissible as evidence of the crime.

After being retained in November 1982, Kaus was shaken by the campaign against him and feared for the independence of the state judiciary. He later remarked, "You cannot forget the fact that you have a crocodile in your bathtub. You keep wondering whether you're letting yourself be influenced, and you do not know. You do not know yourself that well". In addition, his mother-in-law was in failing health. So in October 1985, Kaus resigned from the court. He was replaced by Edward A. Panelli.

After leaving the judiciary, Kaus resumed private practice, forming the law firm of Hufstedler & Kaus in 1986 (the other "name" partner was former U.S. Secretary of Education Shirley Hufstedler), where he occasionally argued cases before the state Supreme Court where he had once served. He also mentored then-associate Jeffrey Ehrlich, who would later rise to national prominence for arguing cases in the United States and California Supreme Court.

== Personal life ==
On January 12, 1943, he married Alice Jane Berta Huttenbach, known as Peggy Alice Kaus (February 8, 1923 – July 5, 2011), in Hyannis, Massachusetts, and they had two sons: Stephen and Michael (Mickey). Stephen went on to become an Alameda County Superior Court Judge until he retired in 2025.

Kaus retired from the practice of law in 1995, as he was diagnosed with lung cancer. On January 11, 1996, he died in Beverly Hills, California. His wife and son, Mickey, were at his side.

== Video ==
- Appearances on C-SPAN

== See also ==
- List of justices of the Supreme Court of California

Legal offices
| Preceded by Wiley W. Manuel | Associate Justice of the Supreme Court of California; 1981–1985 | Succeeded by Edward A. Panelli |
| Preceded by | Presiding Justice of the California Court of Appeal, Second District, Division Five; 1966–1981 | Succeeded by |
| Preceded by | Associate Justice of the California Court of Appeal, Second District, Division Three; 1964–1966 | Succeeded by |
