= Wiley Manuel =

American politician, judge (1927–1981)

Wiley William Manuel

Associate Justice of the Supreme Court of California
- In office March 1977 – January 1981
- Appointed by: Governor Jerry Brown
- Preceded by: Raymond L. Sullivan
- Succeeded by: Otto M. Kaus

Personal details
- Born: August 28, 1927 Oakland, California, U.S.
- Died: January 5, 1981 (aged 53) Oakland, California, U.S.
- Spouse: Eleanor M. Williams (m. 1948)
- Education: University of California, Berkeley (B.A.); Hastings College of Law (LL.B.)

Wiley William Manuel (August 28, 1927–January 5, 1981) was an American judge, lawyer, and politician. He was an associate justice of the Supreme Court of California from 1977 to 1981 and the first African American to serve on the high court.

== Biography ==
Manuel was born in Oakland, California, grew up near Ward and Dohr Streets in South Berkeley, and was educated in the public schools. After graduating in 1945 from Berkeley High School he studied at the University of California, Berkeley. Then he attended Hastings College of Law and in 1953 received his LL.B. degree with Order of the Coif honors. He also served as Editor-in-Chief of the Hastings Law Journal.

Following law school, Manuel worked for 23 years in the California Attorney General's office, rising to chief assistant attorney general in the San Francisco office. In March 1956, then-Deputy Attorney General Manuel announced that municipalities adding fluoride to public drinking water cannot be charged with practicing dentistry.

In January 1976, California Governor Jerry Brown appointed Manuel to the post of judge of the Alameda County Superior Court.

On February 12, 1977, Governor Brown elevated Manuel to the Supreme Court. On March 8, 1977, he was approved by the Judicial Qualifications Commission, he was sworn in on March 24, 1977, and took his seat on April 5, 1977. He was the first African American justice of the Supreme Court. Also in 1977, he delivered the keynote address at the first meeting of the California Association of Black Lawyers. Among his notable cases is the criminal prosecution against William and Emily Harris of the Symbionese Liberation Army on charges of kidnapping Patricia Hearst in 1974. In August 1977, Manuel wrote the 6 – 1 majority opinion that the trial court abused its discretion in denying the defendants' request for state-appointed counsel of their choosing.

Manuel served for only four years before he died of stomach cancer.

== Honors and legacy ==
In honor of Manuel, there is a non-profit scholarship foundation in Northern California. Manuel, who was known for his dedication to pro bono work, has a pro bono award named after him awarded by the State Bar of California each year. The Wiley Manuel Courthouse, part of the Alameda County Superior Court, was named after him.

== Personal life ==
In 1948, he married Eleanor M. Williams, and resided in Oakland, California. He died on January 5, 1981. He was survived by his wife and their two children, Yvonne and Gary Manuel.

== See also ==
- List of justices of the Supreme Court of California
- Allen Broussard
- Lionel Wilson
- Janice Rogers Brown
- Vaino Spencer

Legal offices
Preceded by Raymond L. Sullivan	Associate Justice of the Supreme Court of California; 1977–1981	Succeeded by Otto M. Kaus
