= William Byron Rumford =

American politician (1908–1986)

Member of the California State Assembly from the 17th district
- In office January 3, 1949 – January 2, 1967
- Preceded by: Edward J. Carey
- Succeeded by: John J. Miller

Personal details
- Born: February 2, 1908 Courtland, Arizona, U.S.
- Died: June 12, 1986 (aged 78) Berkeley, California, U.S.
- Party: Democratic
- Education: University of California, Berkeley
- Occupation: Pharmacist, politician

William Byron Rumford (February 2, 1908 – June 12, 1986) was an American pharmacist and politician. He was the first African American elected to a state public office in Northern California.

== Family background ==
Rumford was born in Courtland, Arizona, a now-defunct mining town, the second of Chauncey G. Rumford and Margaret Lee Johnson's two sons. His father, who had left the family when Rumford was very young, lived in Los Angeles, where his family had moved in about 1910 from Iowa by way of Colorado Springs.

Rumford's mother's side were some of the first American settlers of Arizona. His maternal grandmother ran a boarding house in Tombstone and fought to keep the Tucson public schools desegregated. When Whites established separate schools, she relocated to Los Angeles, having decided that "she was not going to bring those kids up in a segregated environment." Rumford remained with his mother in Tucson, where she worked as a housekeeper. His older brother Chauncey moved to Los Angeles to live with his father and paternal grandmother, and Rumford and his mother soon moved to Phoenix, where she married a barber, Elmer J. Williams. They joined the rest of the family in Los Angeles in 1915, living for a time in a large house on Burlington Avenue. There, his paternal grandmother's sister, who was a songwriter, poet, and painter, helped Delilah L. Beasley write her 1916 history The Negro Trail Blazers of California.

His stepfather, however, did not take to Los Angeles well, and returned the family to Phoenix. His mother and stepfather had children of their own, and Williams paid little attention to the Rumford brothers, who had to work to survive.

== Education ==
Rumford graduated from Carver High School, a segregated high school in Phoenix in 1926. He was inspired to attend the University of California, Berkeley, by his high school teachers, particularly Ellis Knox, a Berkeley alumnus who later became the first African American to receive a doctorate on the West Coast. At the age of 18, he moved to San Francisco and worked for a year before enrolling in Sacramento Junior College. He was accepted to the school of pharmacy at the University of California, San Francisco, and worked as a parking valet and a doorman at night. He graduated in 1931.

Rumford was a member of Alpha Phi Alpha (ΑΦΑ) fraternity.

== Career ==
In 1933, Rumford passed the examination for employment with the State of California at a time when few blacks worked for the state. He also took the examination for investigator on the California Board of Pharmacy, passing the written portion twice, but failing the oral portion two times. "I think I frightened everybody to death on the board when I was there for my oral examination. [...] I took the examination for food and drug investigator and I flunked the oral after they asked me about Joe Louis. And later I came back, took it again, and I flunked it again." According to Rumford, the board was "asking silly questions [...] to get rid of blacks."

He then took the examination for state VD investigator and passed, but failed the state examination a third time. He visited the member of the personnel board who lived in Oakland. Christenson, the board member, appealed the board's decision to fail Rumford on the grounds that he was asked irrelevant questions. Rumford appealed on the grounds that the board had publicized the statistic that African Americans suffered from sexually transmitted diseases at a greater rate than other ethnic groups, but had not taken the opportunity to do something about it. He won the appeal and was granted state certification. He became the first African American hired at Highland Hospital in Oakland, California, where he was assistant pharmacist. There he worked under Dr. Benjamin Black, a former army doctor, "outstanding authorit[y] in hospital administration", and "a very prejudiced person." Black was hesitant to hire Rumford, suspecting him of wanting to "make trouble", and was reluctant to raise his salary. But with the help of influential friends, including Thomas E. Caldecott and county Supervisor Harry Bartell, he received a raise at the beginning of World War II. However, he left the job due to the low pay, and was appointed VD investigator. For about a year, he worked primarily at army bases, such as Camp Knight, where his main responsibility was apprehending carriers of STDs. When not on base, he worked in city clinics.

In 1942, while still working for the state, he purchased a pharmacy in Berkeley. He tried to work both jobs, but eventually devoted his energies to the business.

== Public service ==
In 1942, Berkeley Mayor Laurance L. Cross appointed Rumford to the Emergency Housing Committee, which sought to find housing for wartime laborers. In his capacity as committee member, he was able to push for more integrated housing.

He helped organize the Berkeley Interracial Committee, a citizen's committee whose purpose was to "placate and to welcome some of the people and to ameliorate some of the problems that did arise as a result of the influx" of Southerners. The Berkeley Interracial Committee welcomed the Southerners to the community and helped them when they ran into problems. It worked with the Committee on Fair Play to fight the Japanese American internment, and helped the City establish a Human Relations Commission.

In 1944, Governor Earl Warren appointed Rumford to the Rent Control Board, a state agency that was part of a federal wartime program to keep wages and rents down.

== Political career ==
In 1948, he made his first attempt for a seat in the Assembly. He had been involved with the Appomattox Club, "perhaps one of the first" African American political organizations in the Bay Area, since 1932, when it supported the policies of the Roosevelt administration. In the primary, he was supported by the club, as well as by a community caucus, and a group of African American ministers. The CIO withheld support, seeing Rumford as not radical enough. He won the primary, but lost the election to Edgar Hurley, who had filed as both a Republican and a Democrat. Rumford took the case to court, which found that his numbers were much higher than expected in certain areas, and ruled that Rumford had been the rightful winner of the election. Major issues in the campaign were the desegregation of the National Guard and ending discrimination in the hiring of teachers. He began his term as representative of the 17th assembly district in January 1949, joining Gus Hawkins of Los Angeles, who was one of the few legislators who pushed legislation that would benefit African Americans.

Rumford was a Prince Hall freemason, but the masons were not involved in the desegregation movement.

In his first year in the state assembly, Rumford succeeded in passing legislation barring discrimination in the state National Guard. When it reached the state senate, its chances of passing were slim. But Rumford personally lobbied senators Richard J. Dolwig and Earl D. Desmond, and the bill passed the senate as well. In reality, it was not implemented because the members of already-existing black units did not want to lose their titles and ranks. However, no new black units were created, and the Guard was eventually integrated.

In 1953, Rumford invited Governor Earl Warren to address the national convention of Alpha Phi Alpha, held in Berkeley. Despite illness and torrential rain, Warren was glad to make the speech and meet those convened.

While Rumford was in the legislature, his Berkeley pharmacy "became an informal headquarters for other emerging politicians, such as future city of Oakland mayor Lionel Wilson and California Supreme Court Justice Allen Broussard."

== Legislative career ==
One of Rumford's most important achievements was the passage of the California Fair Employment Practices Act, which outlawed employment discrimination. The bill had originally been introduced by Hawkins in 1945, but it never got out of committee. C. L. Dellums (uncle of Congressman and future Oakland mayor Ronald J. Dellums) and other members of the NAACP lobbied in favor of the bill. It passed the assembly in 1955 with the support of Democrats, some of whom were personally opposed to it but succumbed to pressure from within the party, and even a few Republicans, "because they thought it was basically and morally right." It was signed by incoming Governor Pat Brown in 1959, and the Fair Employment Practices Commission was set up the same year.

Rumford served on the assembly's Civil Service Commission, which addressed issues of discrimination in government employment, including the California Highway Patrol and the State Department of Public Health. He also attempted to secure raises for members of the California State Employees Association.

In 1953, he became chairman of the Public Health Committee. He was part of a delegation that went to Detroit to discuss the issue of air pollution with the automotive industry and their researchers. They convinced the industry to send technicians to testify before a joint committee of the California legislature. He was also sent to Germany as a Citizen-Ambassador for the State Department to investigate forms of public transportation. The Public Health Committee passed the first air pollution control act in 1955. It also passed some of the first radiation control acts in the country.

Rumford also served on the "Little Hoover Commission", which made recommendations for the reorganization of state government. In the 1950s, he was appointed chairman of the Records Management Program for the Weinberger Committee on Government Reorganization. The Committee investigated corruption in the State Board of Equalization, which was illegally selling liquor licenses, and sent several of its members to San Quentin State Prison.

The Weinberger Committee also successfully passed the Water Resources Act of 1956, which set up the State Water Board.

In 1959, Rumford investigated the health effects of DDT, and discovered pesticides in milk supplies.

In 1963, Rumford introduced Assembly Bill 1240, the Fair Housing Bill. It became known as the Rumford Fair Housing Bill, and its purpose was to outlaw discrimination in housing. The bill was at the top of Governor Brown's legislative agenda, and it had been endorsed by the NAACP and the California Democratic Party. Nonetheless, it faced strong opposition and was amended several times before being passed by a vote of 47 to 24. When it reached the state senate, members of the Congress of Racial Equality occupied the rotunda of the California State Capitol. Rumford asked them to leave, but they refused. The bill was held up for three months, and the committee didn't hold a hearing on it until the last day of the session. Despite the opposition of the California Real Estate Association, the Apartment House Owners Association, and the Chamber of Commerce, the bill passed the senate and was signed into law by Governor Brown.

Rather than seeking to amend the law, the opposition to the Rumford Fair Housing Act sought to amend the California Constitution to permit housing discrimination with California Proposition 14. Though it passed, it was later declared unconstitutional by the U.S. Supreme Court.

== Senate run ==
In 1966, Rumford ran for a seat in the California State Senate. The seat had been created after a reapportionment to reflect the population growth in Alameda County. According to Rumford, "Mr. Holmdahl and those in the assembly who were doing the reapportioning saw fit not to divide Alameda County into two seats, but to have the two prospective senators running at-large—largely, I believe, because they were fearful that some black might be elected from a portion of the county." John Holmdahl, the current senator, announced that he would not run to keep his seat, which eased the tension between Rumford and Nicholas Petris, the other contender. The two met and agreed that Petris would run for the two-year seat and Rumford the four-year.

Petris's law partner, Edward Fitzsimmons, filed for candidacy, as did Superior Court Judge Victor Wagner and another candidate. The campaign in swing, Petris wrote an endorsement letter for Fitzsimmons, stating that Fitzsimmons would make a better senator. Nonetheless, Rumford soundly defeated all of his opponents in the primary.

In the general election, he faced the poorly-funded Republican candidate, Lewis Sherman. It was the first time that electronic voting machines were used. A reporter informed him that numerous votes had not been counted. Rumford was told that there were 10,000 ballots that had not been counted because "they wouldn't go through the machine." Since the results showed that he was only 600 votes behind, he requested a recount. Recounting, he noticed that a number of ballots were filled out with the same handwriting. Two deputies agreed, and Rumford halted the recount. U.S. Attorney Cecil Poole asked the FBI to look into the case. After a ten-day investigation, the FBI declared that the case had no merit.

Rumford took the case to Alameda County district attorney Frank Coakley, who found large discrepancies between the registrar's records and those kept by the precincts. He requested that the handwriting expert from the State Identification Bureau examine the handwriting samples, but said they were not the same. Rumford and Coakley wanted a second opinion, so Coakley hired the San Francisco postmaster to examine the samples over Rumford's suggestion to have a UC professor of criminology do it. However, before the postmaster received the ballots, they were sent back to the expert from the State Identification Bureau, where they may have been changed. The postmaster came to the same conclusion as the other investigators.

Door-to-door studies found that "there had been no purging of the county list for years and that thousands of sample ballots were lodged in the post offices, both in Oakland and Berkeley." Rumford brought the issue to the attention of the Grand Jury, but the body took no action.

In 1970, he was selected to serve on the Grand Jury, and volunteered for the Committee on Courts Enforcement, which looked into the electoral system in Alameda County. While the commission did not open the case of Rumford's senate run, it did make inquiries into the registration process and as to why so many people were ineligible to vote, as well as looking into the reasons for the quantities of ballots at the post office.

== Service in Washington ==
In 1971, Caspar Weinberger, who was then Chairman of the Federal Trade Commission, invited Rumford to Washington, D.C. to help him with the commission's work protecting consumers. He served for five years as assistant director for Consumer Protection and State-Federal Relations of the Federal Trade Commission (FTC).

== Return to Berkeley ==
In 1976 Rumford returned to private life and his pharmacy, from which he retired in 1981. He developed Parkinson's disease and died in 1986.

== Honors ==
Rumford was honored at the 1972 World Symposium on Air Pollution Control, which recognized his contributions to the fight against air pollution.

In 1980, a segment of state highway 24, the Grove-Shafter Freeway, was renamed the William Byron Rumford Freeway in his honor.

The postal station at the Oakland federal building is named for him, as is a senior housing community in Berkeley.

His archives are housed in the Bancroft Library of the University of California, Berkeley.

A bronze monument to Rumford by artist Dana King was dedicated near the location of his pharmacy on Sacramento Street at Julia Street in Berkeley in July 2016.

Preceded by Edward J. Carey	California State Assembly person 17th district 1949—1967	Succeeded by John J. Miller
