= Murder of Michelle O'Keefe =

2000 murder case in Palmdale, California, United States

Michelle O'Keefe
- Born: Michelle Therese O'Keefe; October 11, 1981; Hanford, California
- Died: February 22, 2000 (aged 18); Palmdale, California, U.S.
- Cause of death: Gunshot wounds
- Known for: Murder victim
- Parents: Michael O'Keefe (father); Patricia O'Keefe (mother)

Michelle O'Keefe was an 18-year-old American college student and aspiring actress who was murdered in Palmdale, California on her way home from appearing in a Kid Rock music video. The case has attracted significant media national attention, including episodes of America's Most Wanted and Dateline NBC.

In 2005, Iraq-war veteran Sgt. Raymond Lee Jennings was arrested for the murder, and after three trials he was sentenced to life in prison.

After serving 11 years of his sentence, Jennings was exonerated and freed from prison. The Los Angeles District Attorney was persuaded of Jennings' innocence after a law student, Clinton Ehrlich, saw the case on television and began an investigation with his father, attorney Jeffrey Ehrlich. Among other points, Clinton and Jeffrey Ehrlich state that: (1) Jennings's uniform tested negative for gunshot residue; (2) he owned a .38 caliber handgun and was unarmed, while O'Keefe was killed with a 9mm weapon; (3) his DNA did not match that from visible blood found under O'Keefe's fingernails, which the prosecutor misled the jury to believe was random contamination; (4) and the detectives on the case had not investigated other people present at the Park-and-Ride when O'Keefe was murdered. The judge who freed Jennings said that the jury was never given crucial information: that known gang members were present at the scene of the crime.

In their filings to the court supporting Jennings's innocence claim and requesting his release, the DA's office revealed that they believed the killing to be gang related. Driving a car that had been in the parking lot at the time of O'Keefe's murder, was Victoria Richardson—a 17-year-old female who, like her 18-year-old boyfriend Andrew Stewart, was a Bloods gang member. In the months following O'Keefe's murder, Andrew Stewart perpetrated a series of home invasions and carjackings, including the gunpoint theft of a Ford Mustang, for which he was sentenced to 31 years in prison. When arrested, he was wearing an earring that matched one of O'Keefe's, and was found to have been missing from her corpse. Ballistics evidence suggested that the 9mm weapon used to kill her was the same as one he and/or other Flushing Fifties gang members had used in recent shootings.

Sgt. Ray Jennings was found factually innocent of the crime, an unusual and far higher standard than simple de jure or presumed innocence.

== See also ==
- List of unsolved murders (2000–present)
