= John H. Reading =

American politician

44th Mayor of Oakland
- In office 1966–1977
- Preceded by: John C. Houlihan
- Succeeded by: Lionel Wilson

Member of the Oakland City Council from the 7th district
- In office 1961–1966
- Preceded by: John C. Houlihan
- Succeeded by: Frank H. Ogawa

Personal details
- Born: November 26, 1917 Glendale, Arizona, U.S.
- Died: February 7, 2003 (aged 85) Indian Wells, California, U.S.
- Education: University of California, Berkeley

John H. Reading (November 26, 1917 – February 7, 2003) was an American businessman and politician based in Oakland, California. He was elected as the 44th Mayor of Oakland, California and served three four-year terms, from 1966 to 1977. Reading is the last Republican to be elected Mayor of Oakland.

== Early life and career ==
Born in Glendale, Arizona, Reading moved as a youth with his family to Oakland. There he attended public schools, including Fremont High School. He graduated from the University of California, Berkeley in 1940.

During World War II, Reading served in the Army Air Force as both a pilot and flight training officer. He attained the rank of Lieutenant Colonel.

After the war, Reading inherited his father's business, Ingram's Food Products. The company was based in East Oakland, and was famous for frozen Red's Tamales. In 1950, Reading bought out his father's interest in the company and expanded its reach statewide. Reading also was president of the Reading Machinery Company, Tempting Food's Inc. and the Joanna Banana Corporation.

== Political career ==
in 1961, to the surprise of many, including Reading himself, Mayor John C. Houlihan asked Reading if he would be willing to serve on the City Council, taking Houlihan's previous spot. Shortly afterwards, he was appointed to the Oakland City Council. During his time as a councilman, Reading criticized the Oakland Raiders for asking the city to fund construction of a large press box at Frank Youell Field. despite the city approving the use of emergency funding for the field. He also called on Mayor Houlihan to appoint more qualified minorities to city boards and commissions. On February 2, 1966, Reading announced that he would run for California's 15th State Assembly District. However later in the month, Mayor Houlihan announced that he would be resigning his position as Mayor, with Reading and fellow city councilman Felix Chialvo being named as potential successors. Reading would eventually be appointed Mayor on March 2, 1966, with an official start date of April 30.

Early in his tenure, Reading announced a five point jobs program intended to assist what he called "Oakland's voiceless minorities". At the same time, Reading opposed the idea of community organizations such as the Oakland Council of Churches protesting and bringing in organizers such as Saul Alinsky. After the announcement, Mexican-American community leaders were outraged by the Reading's language and accused him of governing by condescension. Additionally, Reading had wanted to appoint African American leader Carl B. Metoyer to replace his previous spot on the council, but other council members rejected Metoyer, instead appointing Frank H. Ogawa to the council. In May 1966, Lionel Wilson, the president of the Oakland Economic Development Council criticized Oakland's City Council for not supporting some of Reading's plan for uplifting Oakland's minority population.

In 1968 Charlie Finley moved the Athletics baseball team from Kansas City to Oakland during Mayor Reading's tenure. The Oakland Athletics won three World Series while Reading was mayor. He was instrumental in gaining funding and supporting construction of the new Oakland Coliseum and expansion of the Oakland International Airport.

Reading was elected three times: in 1967 to the position of mayor by appointment on an unexpired term, in 1969 for his first full four-year term. In 1973, Reading was forced into a run-off election by Democrat Bobby Seale, co-founder of the Black Panther Party. Reading won re-election easily.

Reading returned to his business after serving as mayor. He lived with his family in the Oak Knoll District of Oakland. Reading died in 2003 in Indian Wells, California.

Political offices
Preceded by John C. Houlihan	Mayor of Oakland, California; 1966–1977	Succeeded by Lionel Wilson
