= Allen Broussard =

American judge (1929-1996)

Allen Edgar Broussard

Associate Justice of the California Supreme Court
- In office July 22, 1981 – August 31, 1991
- Preceded by: William P. Clark Jr.
- Succeeded by: Ronald M. George

Personal details
- Born: Allen Edgar Broussard; April 13, 1929 Lake Charles, Louisiana, U.S.
- Died: November 5, 1996 (aged 67) Oakland, California, U.S.
- Spouse: Odessa Monroe (m. 1959)
- Children: 2
- Education: San Francisco City College; University of California, Berkeley (B.A., J.D)
- Occupation: Lawyer, judge, civic leader

Allen Edgar Broussard (April 13, 1929 – November 5, 1996) was an American attorney who rose to become an associate justice of the California Supreme Court from July 22, 1981, to August 31, 1991.

== Biography ==
Broussard was born in Lake Charles, Louisiana, the son of Clemire and Eugenia Broussard (née Rochon), who were Catholics of Creole ancestry. At the age of sixteen, he moved with his working class family to California, where his father was a longshoreman, and his mother worked as a seamstress.

As a young man, Broussard held various part-time jobs, including selling shoes and working in a canning plant. He financed his own education, first at San Francisco City College, then the University of California at Berkeley, and the University of California, Berkeley School of Law. At Boalt, he was vice-president of the Boalt Hall Law Students Association and a contributor to the California Law Review.

After graduating in 1953, he served in the United States Army for two years. After completing Basic Army Administration school as a clerk typist, he became a chaplain's assistant in Germany, where he served for 19 months. After leaving the Army, he became the research attorney for Raymond E. Peters, Presiding Justice of the California Court of Appeal, First District, Division One. In 1959, Broussard entered private practice with Wilson, Metoyer & Sweeny.

Broussard was one of a group of influential African American leaders in East Bay politics, including Norvel Smith, and state Court of Appeal Justice Clinton White. He was part of a coterie that used to meet at the pharmacy of William Byron Rumford, along with Lionel Wilson. In 1972, Broussard was the first African American to be elected president of the California Judges Association. He also became chairman of the Board of the Center for Judicial Education and Research.

== Judicial career ==
Broussard was one of the first African Americans to become a judge in California. In 1964, California Governor Edmund G. "Pat" Brown appointed Broussard as a judge of the Municipal Court for the Oakland-Piedmont (later Oakland-Piedmont-Emeryville) Judicial District. His record caught the attention of Democratic governor Jerry Brown, who, in 1975, appointed Broussard as a judge of the Alameda County Superior Court. He went on to serve as Presiding Judge of the Superior Court. In 1981 Governor Jerry Brown elevated Broussard to the California Supreme Court, where he served as Associate Justice until 1991. His term followed Wiley Manuel, who was on the bench 1977–1981.

On the court, Broussard was a leading liberal in the court's majority, along with Chief Justice Rose Bird. He wrote the majority of opinions for the court at that time. By 1982, five of the seven justices on the court were Brown appointees, who were widely criticized as allegedly soft on crime and overly political. Even though the judges had somewhat different individual philosophies, they were lumped together by conservative politicians who derisively labeled them as "Jerry's Judges" and "Rosie & The Supremes." Critics repeatedly claimed that Broussard and other Brown appointees ruled on the basis of personal opinion and political bias rather than the law and the state Constitution.

In 1982, Broussard was up for election reconfirmation. A campaign was waged against him and the other Brown appointees on the ballot that year (Cruz Reynoso and Otto Kaus), something that was unprecedented in California history. Broussard was reconfirmed to a 12-year term, as expected, with 56% of the vote, but that was below the typical confirmation vote. In 1986, three of his colleagues (Bird, Cruz Reynoso, and Joseph Grodin) were resoundingly voted off the court, and they were replaced by conservative justices. Broussard was disturbed by this development and expressed fear that the judiciary would become politicized.

On August 31, 1991, Broussard retired from the court and Governor Pete Wilson appointed Ronald M. George to the seat.

== Life after judiciary ==
After retiring from the judiciary, Broussard served on the Oakland Port Commission, which involved visiting ports around the world, especially Asia. In 1987, he led a group of 72 lawyers, port officials including: port commissioner Carole Ward Allen, and city officials on a 3-week long trip to China meeting Jiang Zemin, the mayor of Shanghai. Shanghai is a "twin city" of San Francisco.

== Personal life ==
As chairman of a civic organization called Men of Tomorrow, he contacted Odessa Monroe, the program director of the radio station KSAN, seeking free air time. He went on to marry her in 1959, and they had two sons, Keith and Craig.

== Selected publications ==
- Broussard, Allen (1995). Working for equality in the California courts. Berkeley, CA: Black Alumni Club, University of California, Berkeley. OCLC 32233676.
- Broussard, Allen E. (Winter 1952–1953). "Contracts: Forfeiture Clauses: Relief to Vendee in Default in California". California Law Review. 40 (4): 593–599. doi:10.2307/3477908. JSTOR 3477908.

== Papers and oral history ==
- A California Supreme Court justice looks at law and society, 1964–1996: Allen E. Broussard oral history transcript. (1997). Interview by Gabrielle Morris. Bancroft Library, Regional Oral History Office, via Calisphere.
- Allen Broussard Papers. California Judicial Center Library, Special Collections and Archives. Online Archives of California.

== See also ==
- List of African-American jurists
- List of justices of the Supreme Court of California
- Wiley Manuel
- Lionel Wilson
- Carole Ward Allen
- Janice Rogers Brown
- Jami Floyd
- Vaino Spencer

Legal offices
Preceded by William P. Clark Jr.	Associate Justice of the California Supreme Court; 1981–1991	Succeeded by Ronald M. George
