= Harold Zerby =

American football player (1902–1963)

Profile
- Position: End

Personal information
- Born: September 21, 1902; Canton, Ohio, U.S.
- Died: October 12, 1963 (aged 61); Canton, Ohio, U.S.
- Listed height: 5 ft 10 in (1.78 m)
- Listed weight: 185 lb (84 kg)

Career information
- College: None

Career history
- Canton Bulldogs (1926)
- Stats at Pro Football Reference

Harold "Hooley" Zerby (September 21, 1902 – October 12, 1963) was an American football player and golfer.

Zerby was born in Canton, Ohio and lived there throughout his life. He played one game in the National Football League (NFL) with the Canton Bulldogs during the 1926. He was born in Canton.

Zerby was also a golfer. He won the amateur championship of Stark County, Ohio, in 1941. In 1950, he was appointed as the pro manager at the Tam-O-Shanter golf course in Canton, Ohio. He remained as the pro and manager at Tam-O-Shanter until his retirement in 1962. He died in 1963 at his home in Canton.
