= Kauss =

Kauss is a German language surname. Such as the related Kaus it either belongs to the group of family names derived from a given names – in this case from several compound names of Germanic origin with the element gōʐ "Goth" (e. g. Goswin, Gosbert, Gosbald or Gauzbert) – or may be a variant of the habitational name Kues (from Late Latin covis "field barn", "rack"). In addition, kauss in the Latvian and Estonian language means "bowl" and therefore is an occupational name for a maker or seller of this kind of container in these language communities. Notable people with the name include:

- August Kauss (1843–1913), American soldier
- Sarah Kauss, American businesswoman
