= University of California College of the Law, San Francisco =

Public law school in San Francisco, California

- Motto: Fiat Justitia ("Let justice be done")
- Established: 1878
- School type: Public law school
- Dean: David L. Faigman (Chancellor and Dean)
- Location: San Francisco, California, United States; 37°46′50″N 122°24′55″W
- Enrollment: 1,116 (2023)
- Faculty: 70 (full-time) 209 (part-time)
- USNWR ranking: 85th (2026)
- Bar pass rate: 86% (2025 1st time takers)
- Website: uclawsf.edu
- ABA profile: Standard 509 Report

The University of California College of the Law, San Francisco (UC Law San Francisco or UC Law SF) is a public law school in San Francisco. It was formerly known as the University of California, Hastings College of the Law (UC Hastings). The school was founded in 1878 by Serranus Clinton Hastings, the first chief justice of the Supreme Court of California. It was the first law school established by the University of California and one of the earliest law schools in California. Although UC Law SF is legally affiliated with the University of California system, it is not governed directly by the Regents of the University of California.

== History ==
=== Founding of the law school ===
Serranus Clinton Hastings, founder of Hastings College of the Law

In 1878, Serranus Clinton Hastings donated $100,000 (equivalent to $3,340,000 in 2025) for the creation of a law school. He arranged for the enactment of a legislative act on March 26, 1878, to create the Hastings College of the Law as a separate legal entity affiliated with the University of California. This was apparently intended for compatibility with Section 8 of the university's Organic Act, which authorized the board of regents to affiliate with independent self-sustaining professional colleges. Another reason for making the gift in this fashion was that Hastings desired to impose certain conditions on his gift, while "policy and law dictated that a free-gift could not be hedged by power of reversion."

According to the Hastings College of the Law's official centennial history, its founder, "whether from arrogance, oversight, ignorance, or a combination of all three, was the author of his own troubles." Although the founder had selected the original Hastings board of directors from among his professional acquaintances, he failed to adequately verify their concurrence with his beliefs that a proper legal education must include a course in legal ethics and must also be hybridized with elements of a liberal arts education. To his horror, it turned out they all believed that the only purpose of a law school was to provide vocational education in how to practice law. This latter belief was shared by the first professor hired, John Norton Pomeroy, who personally taught the vast majority of courses during the law school's early years. The founder hoped to educate cultured intellectuals who also happened to be lawyers; the board simply wanted to produce lawyers. It was impossible to reconcile these fundamentally different visions, and by September 1882, the founder had become estranged from his own handpicked board. By that point in time, he had come to see the UC Board of Regents as a superior vehicle for infusing liberal arts and legal ethics into his law school, and in March 1883 arranged for another legislative act that purported to transfer the Hastings College of the Law directly to the University of California and vested responsibility for its governance in the regents. This was in facial conflict with the "affiliate" language in Section 8 of the Organic Act, so in March 1885, another act was passed to create a pro forma board of trustees for the sole purpose of holding title to the law school's assets at arm's length from the regents (but under which the regents would continue to have the right to manage such assets).

In deference to the 1883 act, the Hastings board of directors ceased to meet. But because the regents chose to remain neutral in the long-simmering dispute between board and founder—and did not attempt to exercise any control under the 1883 or 1885 acts—Hastings went through a strange period from September 1882 to April 1885 where it operated with no actual supervision from any governing board.

On April 25, 1885, the Hastings board of directors convened to appoint Perrie Kewen as the new registrar, because the previous registrar had died. At the request of Serranus Clinton Hastings, Attorney General Edward C. Marshall challenged Kewen's appointment by initiating a proceeding for a writ of quo warranto in San Francisco County Superior Court. On March 30, 1886, in what became known as Kewen's Case, the Supreme Court of California upheld Kewen's appointment by declaring the 1883 and 1885 acts to be unconstitutional on the basis of a provision of the 1879 state constitution guaranteeing the legislative independence of the University of California. In other words, the 1879 ratification of the state's second constitution (which remains in effect today) effectively stripped the California State Legislature of the power to amend preexisting statutes governing the University of California, including the 1878 act. This was the last time that Serranus Clinton Hastings would try to shape the future of the law school that he had founded; the Hastings College of the Law has maintained its hard-fought independence from the Regents ever since. The irony of Kewen's Case is that a constitutional provision intended to protect the University of California was applied in such a way as to prevent the university from taking control of its first law school.

In contrast, the "Affiliated Colleges" — the medical, dental, nursing, and pharmacy schools in San Francisco — were affiliated with the University of California through written agreements, and not statutes invested with constitutional importance by court decisions. In the early 20th century, the Affiliated Colleges agreed to voluntarily submit to the regents' governance during the term of UC President Benjamin Ide Wheeler, as the UC Board of Regents had come to recognize the problems inherent in the existence of independent entities that shared the UC brand but over which the university had no real control. While Hastings remained independent, the Affiliated Colleges began to increasingly coordinate with each other and the rest of the UC bureaucracy in Berkeley under the supervision of the president and the regents, and evolved into the health sciences campus known today as the University of California, San Francisco.

=== The part-time law school ===
In 1899, the Hastings board of directors declined an invitation from the regents to join the Affiliated Colleges at their new campus at Parnassus Heights. The board was reluctant to move the law school from its traditional Civic Center location, but this doomed the law school to five more decades of wandering from one temporary site to the next, for a total of 16 different locations between its founding and the opening of a permanent campus in 1953.

In 1900, Hastings College of the Law became one of 27 charter members of the Association of American Law Schools (AALS).

The Hastings College of the Law was for many years considered the primary law school of the University of California with the purpose of preparing lawyers for the practice of law in the state, whereas the Department of Jurisprudence on the Berkeley campus—which later became the School of Jurisprudence, then Boalt Hall School of Law, and now Berkeley Law—was intended for the study of law as an academic discipline. Both schools were launched with one professor assisted by part-time instructors who also happened to be practicing lawyers. During the early 20th century, Berkeley initiated a rapid transition to hiring full-time lecturers and professors to teach the majority of its law courses, but Hastings did not. After Berkeley started to award law degrees in May 1903, Berkeley swiftly eclipsed Hastings and pushed the older law school into a long period of severe decline. Enrollment at Hastings plunged from 100 students in 1912 to only 76 by 1915.

During this difficult era, Hastings was widely seen as a homeless, "peripatetic law school" with part-time faculty teaching part-time working students whom for whatever reason were unable to attend a full-time law school program. With no permanent campus, Hastings could not build its own academic law library, then regarded as an essential component of a law school (before the invention of computer-assisted legal research), and was forced to rely on the city's public law library. As a result, Hastings was involuntarily ejected from AALS twice, in 1916 and 1927.

Even the deanship was a part-time job before 1933. This explains how Edward Robeson Taylor could simultaneously serve as dean of Hastings, dean of a medical college, chairman of the board of trustees of the San Francisco Public Library, poet laureate of San Francisco, and Mayor of San Francisco. His successor, Maurice E. Harrison, simultaneously served as dean of Hastings, regent of the University of California, and partner at a predecessor of the modern Morrison & Foerster law firm (he later co-founded Brobeck, Phleger & Harrison). It was not until William M. Simmons served as dean from 1925 to 1940 that the deanship was converted to a full-time position.

The same statute that affiliated Hastings with the University of California also designated the Hastings College of the Law as the University of California's "law department." According to the University of California, Los Angeles political science professor J.A.C. Grant, it was believed there could only be one "law department" (i.e., only one official UC law school), which is why the Department of Jurisprudence at Berkeley retained its name even after it began to award law degrees. The University of California, Berkeley did not rename its School of Jurisprudence to a School of Law until the state legislature passed a bill in 1947 authorizing UCLA to create a "school of law." Boalt Hall's newly-hired dean, William Lloyd Prosser, got wind of this in 1948 while visiting UCLA to help plan the new law school and decided that Berkeley could get away with the same thing.

=== Transformation ===
Hastings College of the Law underwent a dramatic transformation under the leadership of David E. Snodgrass, who served as dean from 1940 to 1963. Snodgrass was a "feisty, outspoken advocate" who fought fiercely as dean to elevate the law school's profile both within California and at the national level. The only reason why Hastings and Berkeley's coldly distant relationship remained collegial during most of his deanship—to the extent that Snodgrass openly supported the name change of the School of Jurisprudence and Prosser agreed to not challenge legislative appropriations for Hastings—was that he and Prosser had been friends since their days as classmates at Harvard College.

During the post–World War II economic expansion, Snodgrass was able to capitalize on a massive surge of interest in legal careers among G.I. Bill veterans and baby boomers. With its flexible part-time program, its heavy reliance on part-time instructors who made up the majority of its faculty, its habit of holding classes in any space it could scrounge up (including courtrooms and the city's public library), and its lenient admission requirement of only two years of college-level work (increased to three in 1950), Hastings could expand very quickly in a way that elitist, bureaucratic Boalt Hall could not. Enrollment at Hastings exploded from 300 in 1941 to 496 in 1946 and to 917 in 1949. It was the rapid postwar expansion of Hastings which enabled Boalt Hall to vault into the top tier of American law schools by the 1990s, by relieving political pressure on the law faculty at Berkeley to compromise on their strict standards for student admissions and faculty hiring.

It was Snodgrass who finally found Hastings a permanent home. He obtained an appropriation of $1.45 million from the state legislature and additional funding in the amount of $300,000 from the UC Board of Regents towards the construction of the law school's first permanent building, which opened on March 26, 1953. The building was later renamed Snodgrass Hall in honor of the man who had brought it into existence, and was the center of academic life at Hastings for over six decades before its demolition in October 2020.

=== The 65 Club ===
Snodgrass exploited the law school's independence from the University of California and its mandatory retirement policies to begin the "65 Club", the practice of hiring faculty who had been forced into mandatory retirement at age 65 from Ivy League and other elite institutions. The very first appointment in 1940 was Orrin Kip McMurray, a Hastings graduate who had served as Boalt Hall's second dean. Other American law schools competed aggressively after World War II to hire young up-and-coming law professors, but by focusing his efforts on hiring elderly ones, Snodgrass was able to bring many distinguished law professors to Hastings for "very reasonable salaries". This strategy was so successful at bringing high-quality faculty to Hastings that by 1948, 60 percent of the full-time faculty were professors who had retired from other law schools. In the mid-1950s, Newsweek published a story in which former Harvard Law School dean and jurist Roscoe Pound praised Hastings: "Indeed, on the whole, I am inclined to think you have the strongest law faculty in the nation."

Despite the difficult history between Berkeley and Hastings, Berkeley supplied more members of the 65 Club than any other law school, including Prosser himself, which led to a more amicable relationship between the two law schools. The 65 Club looked to Berkeley as their model and insisted on raising standards to match their previous institutions. By the 1990s, the Hastings student body was "full-time, college educated, and highly qualified". After laws were enacted to prohibit age discrimination in the United States, however, the 65 Club was gradually phased out, and Hastings hired its last 65 Club professor in 1998.

=== Renaming ===
Adjunct professor John Briscoe outlined a "Moral Case for Renaming Hastings College of the Law" in a 2017 opinion essay, explaining the school's founder, Serranus Clinton Hastings, "was promoter and financier of Indian-hunting expeditions in the 1850s" and his acquisition of land titles "was facilitated by the massacre of the rightful claimants."

The specific charges against Hastings are that he organized militias led by his employees to massacre the Yuki people who lived on or near his extensive land-holdings in Mendocino County, California, in the late 1850s during the California genocide. Hundreds of Yuki, including women and children, were killed in what are called the Round Valley Settler Massacres of 1856–1859.

In 2020, after studying the matter for three years, a commission established by the school confirmed that its founder had managed a forced labor camp, organized murderous "Indian hunts", and otherwise participated actively in the genocide that killed most of the Native American population of Mendocino County, California. However, the commission – which was led by chancellor David L. Faigman – recommended against a proposal to rename the school "as it could lead to public confusion" and "result in a decline in applications and perhaps a loss of philanthropic and alumni support." One commission member publicly expressed disagreement and argued for a name change.

On October 27, 2021, The New York Times published an article about S.C. Hastings' involvement in genocide against the Yuki and advocating for a name change. That same day, Faigman responded to the Times article: "There is no effort from me or the college to oppose a name change ... Such a change would require action from the California State Legislature and Governor's office... If changing the name is something the College needs to do to bring restorative action and there is legislative action to facilitate that change, I will engage with that process." The article galvanized alumni, including former San Francisco mayor and Democratic Party power broker Willie Brown, to support a name change. On November 2, 2021, the board of directors for the University of California, Hastings College of the Law, voted unanimously to remove Serranus Clinton Hastings from the name of the law school. On July 27, 2022, the board of directors voted unanimously to rename the law school the University of California College of the Law, San Francisco (UC Law SF). The name change bill was signed into law by Governor Gavin Newsom on September 23, 2022, and took effect January 1, 2023.

On October 4, 2022, descendants of Serranus Clinton Hastings filed suit against the UC Law SF directors and the state to block the name change. The plaintiffs were represented by lawyers Harmeet Dhillon, Gregory Michael and Dorothy Yamamoto. The suit claims that the California act of 1878 contains the terms of a contract with Serranus Hastings. Interviewed in the San Francisco Chronicle, David Carrillo (a member of the law faculty at the University of California, Berkeley, and not involved in the suit) said that there is a distinction between a signed agreement between Serranus Clinton Hastings and the state (which could be a binding contract that the legislature cannot repudiate by enactment) and a legislative act (which cannot prevent the legislature from later amending or repealing it). The lawsuit was dismissed in February 2024 following a ruling that the 1878 act was not a binding contract.

== Location ==
UC Law SF campus spreads among four main buildings located near San Francisco's Civic Center: 200 McAllister Street houses academic space and administrative offices, 333 Golden Gate Avenue contains mainly classrooms and faculty offices, 198 McAllister is a 14-story residence complex with 657 units of housing, and 100 McAllister, known casually as "The Tower", contains university office and further student housing, as well as the Art Deco "Sky Room" on the 24th floor.

The campus is within walking distance of the Muni Metro and Bay Area Rapid Transit Civic Center/UN Plaza station. Located within a two-block radius of the campus is the United States Court of Appeals for the Ninth Circuit, the United States District Court for the Northern District of California, the California Supreme Court, the California Court of Appeal for the First District, San Francisco Superior Court, San Francisco City Hall, United Nations Plaza (and Federal Building Annex), the Asian Art Museum of San Francisco, and the Main Library of the San Francisco Public Library system.

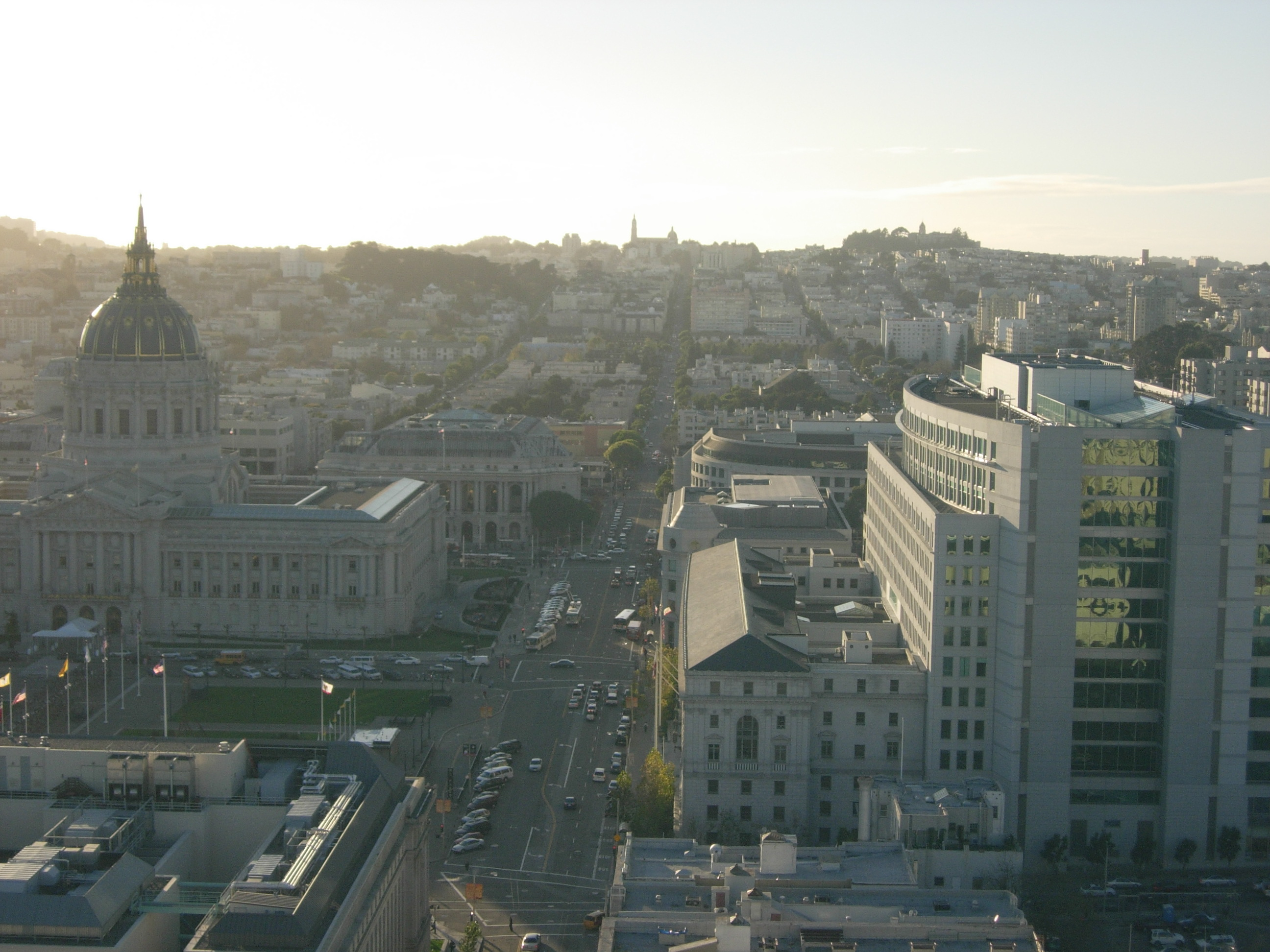
View west from the 24th floor James Edgar Hervey Skyroom at 100 McAllister Street. Visible buildings include San Francisco City Hall with its prominent dome, the city's Asian Art Museum of San Francisco at the left foreground and the Supreme Court of California on the right.

Historically, UC Law SF had operated its own Public Safety Department, but in June 2016, UC Law SF entered into a contract with UCSF under which the UCSF Police Department assumed responsibility for patrolling the UC Law SF campus.

== Organization and structure ==
UC Law SF is managed by an eleven-member board of directors. The UC Law SF's board of directors exists independently of, and is not controlled by, the Regents of the University of California. Pursuant to California law, ten of the directors are appointed by the governor of California. Pursuant to the UC Law SF constitutive documents, the eleventh director must be a direct lineal descendant of UC Law SF founder Serranus Clinton Hastings. The Hastings family member now serving on the board is Claes H. Lewenhaupt.

UC Law SF's detachment from the UC Regents gives it a broad degree of independence in shaping educational and fiscal policies; however, due to a shrinking California education budget, UC Law SF must also compete for limited educational funds against its fellow UC campuses. Despite the apparent competition among the UC law schools, UC Law SF was able to maintain its traditionally high standards without having to decrease class size or raise tuition to higher levels than fellow UC law schools, until the California budget crisis in June 2009, first raised the possibility of slashing $10 million in state funding.

A few days later, however, lawmakers rejected the harsh budget cut, agreeing to cut only $1 million and apparently preventing dramatic tuition hikes.

Under California law, if the government ever cuts funding to UC Law SF to below the 19th-century figure of $7,000 a year, the state must return the $100,000, plus interest, to the Hastings family. State Sen. Mark Leno (D-San Francisco) has argued that the rejected $10 million budget cut, in abandoning state financial support for the school, would have allowed the Hastings family to launch an expensive court fight to reclaim the $100,000 plus hefty interest.

== Academics ==
=== Admissions ===
For the class entering in 2023, UC Law SF accepted 30.91% of applicants, with 29.54% of those accepted enrolling. The average enrollee had a 160 LSAT score and 3.59 undergraduate GPA.

=== Rankings ===
U.S. News & World Report ranks UC Law SF at 85th among law schools in the United States and, in 2015, as the most diverse of the five law schools in the UC system. In 2022, UC Law SF was ranked 2nd for Asian students, and ranked 22nd for Hispanic students, by The National Jurist: The Magazine for Law Students.

In 2023, UC Law SF received an "A-" rating by The National Jurist's preLaw magazine, and was one of the four top-ranked UC law schools, in the "Best Schools for Law Firm Employment" listing.

In 2023, preLaw magazine ranked UC Law SF ninth for public interest law and first for criminal defense and prosecution.

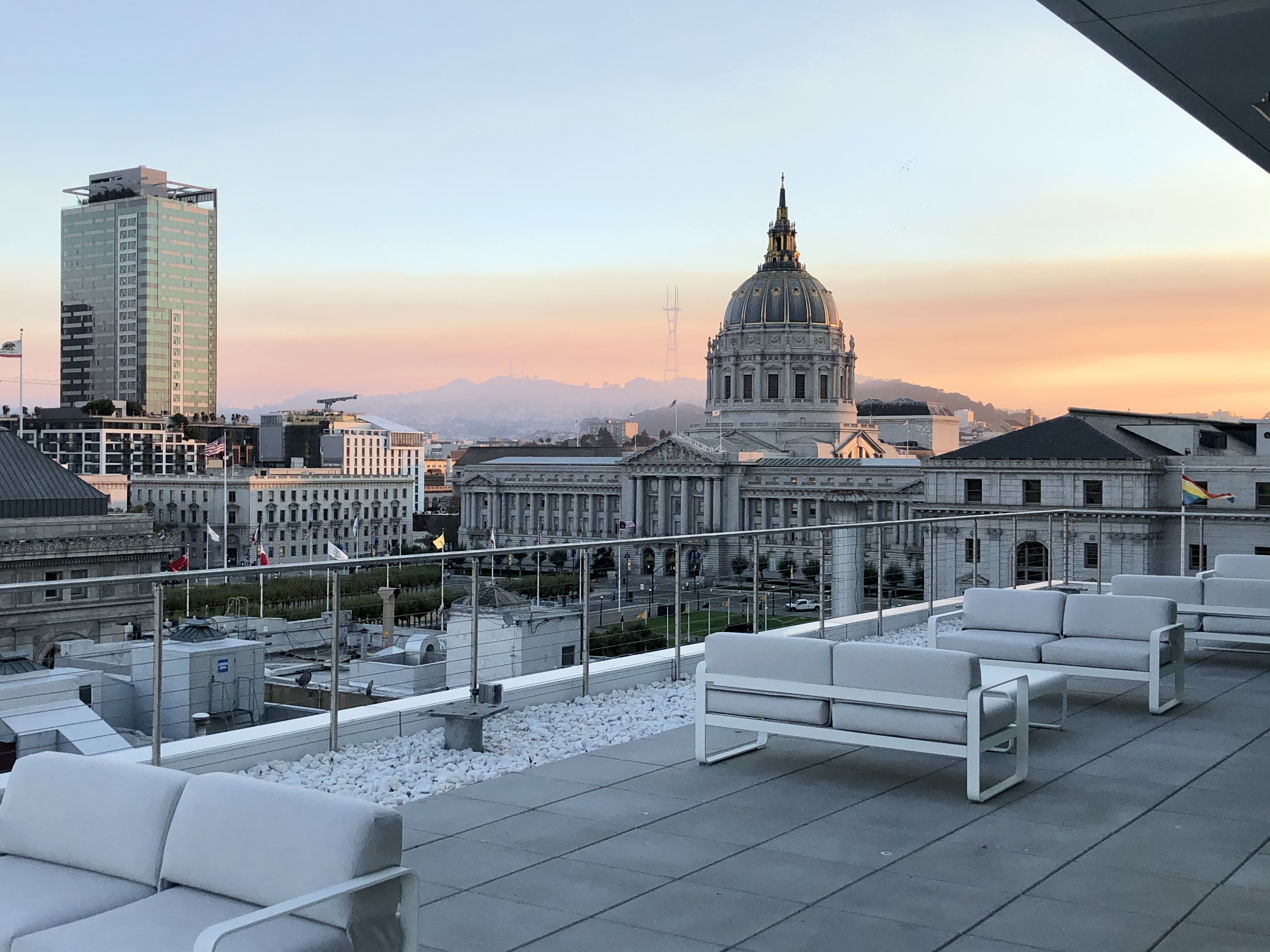
View from 333 Golden Gate Avenue roof-deck

For 2022-23 UC Law SF had the No.2 moot court program in the country, and placed first the prior two years, according to The National Jurist. The Web site "Law School Advocacy" also ranked UC Law SF as the top moot court program in the country in 2021, with Top 5 rankings in each of the previous five years.

In 2023, UC Law SF's flagship law review, the UC Law Journal, was ranked 43rd among all law journals nationally according to the Washington & Lee Law Journal Rankings.

=== Degree programs ===
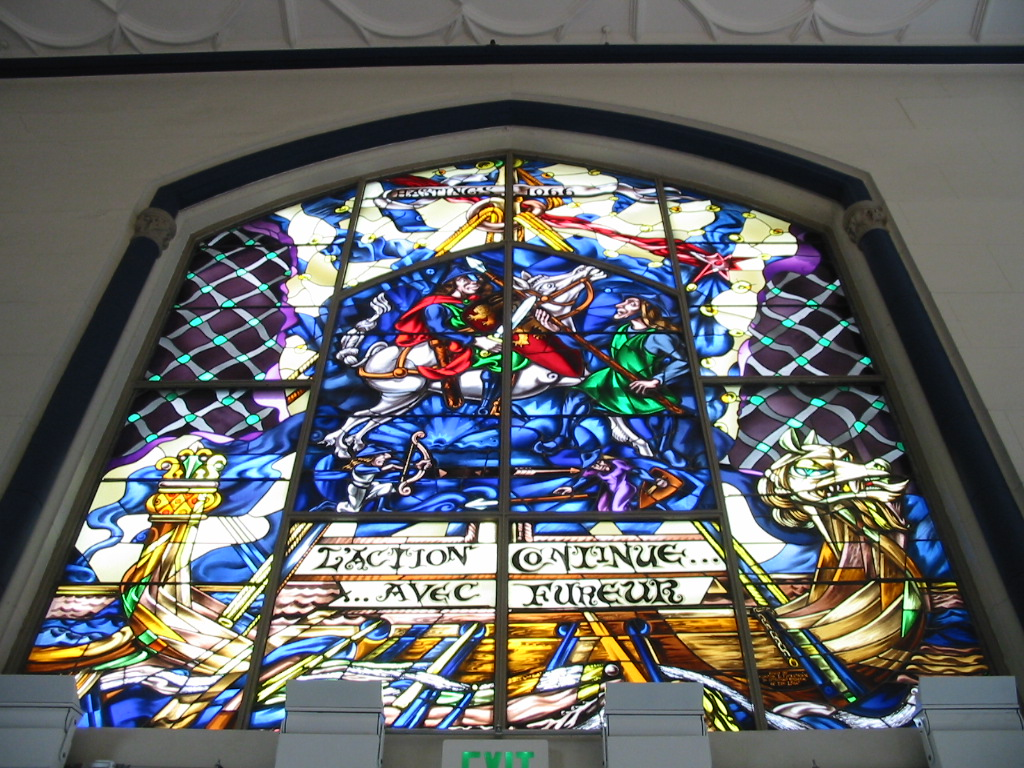
The Battle of Hastings (1066) as depicted on a stained glass window over the main entrance of 100 McAllister Street.

UC Law SF offers a three-year Juris Doctor program with concentrated studies available in seven areas: civil litigation, criminal law, international law, public interest law, taxation, family law, and recently, a new concentration in intellectual property law. Most J.D. students follow a traditional three-year plan. During the first year, students take required courses as well as one elective course. In the second and third years, students may take any course or substitute or supplement their courses with judicial externships or internships, judicial clinics, or study abroad. The college also offers a one-year LL.M. degree in U.S. legal studies for students holding law degrees from foreign law programs. It is an American Bar Association (ABA) accredited law school since 1939.

UC Law SF participates in the Concurrent Degree Program with UC Santa Cruz's Masters of Science in Applied Economics and Finance. In this 3+3 program, students may concurrently earn a JD from UC Law SF and a master's degree in applied economics and finance from Santa Cruz, by pursuing the two degrees concurrently, eligible students can earn both degrees in less time than it would take to earn them serially. UC Law SF also participates in the Concurrent Degree Program with U.C. Berkeley's Haas Graduate School of Business. Upon completion of a four-year program, the student earns a Berkeley M.B.A. degree and a J.D. degree from UC Law SF College of the Law.

UC Law SF College of the Law and the UCSF School of Medicine of the University of California, San Francisco have commenced a joint degree program, and in 2011 began enrolling their first class of graduate students in the Master of Studies in Law (MSL) and LL.M. in Law, Science and Health Policy programs. Students have coursework available at each institution for fulfillment of the degrees. This program is a component of the UCSF/UC Law SF Consortium on Law, Science and Health Policy.

UC Law SF has a chapter of the Order of the Coif, a national law school honorary society founded for the purposes of encouraging legal scholarship and advancing the ethical standards of the legal profession. It joined the Association of American Law Schools (AALS) as a charter member in 1900; it renewed its membership in 1949.

== Post-graduation employment ==
According to UC Law SF official 2023 ABA-required disclosures, 85% of the Class of 2023 obtained full-time, long-term, JD-required or -advantaged employment nine months after graduation, excluding solo-practitioners.

== Bar examination passage rates ==
For the 2025 Bar Examinations, 86% of UC Law SF Law graduates taking the exam for the first time passed.

== Costs ==
The total cost of attendance (indicating the cost of tuition, fees, and living expenses) at UC Law SF for the 2024–2025 academic year is $57,215 for California residents and $64,703 for non-residents. UC Law SF does not offer full-tuition scholarships.

== Publications ==
=== Journals ===
The oldest law journal at UC Law SF is the UC Law Journal which was founded in 1949. The second oldest journal is the UC Law Constitutional Quarterly, which was founded in 1973. Inaugurated in 1997 to oversee the growing number of publications at UC Law SF, the O'Brien Center for Scholarly Publications now manages the publication of the ten UC Law SF journals.

- UC Law Journal
- UC Law Constitutional Quarterly
- UC Law Communications and Entertainment Law Journal
- UC Law Journal on Gender and Justice
- UC Law International Law Review
- UC Law Journal of Race and Economic Justice
- UC Law Environmental Journal
- UC Law Science & Technology Journal
- UC Law Business Journal
- UC Law Journal of Crime and Punishment

=== Books ===
The O'Brien Center at UC Law SF has published three books:

- Forgive Us Our Press Passes, by Daniel Schorr
- The Traynor Reader: Essays, by the Honorable Roger Traynor.
- Hastings College of the Law – The First Century, a centennial history of the UC Law SF commissioned by the UC Law SF Board in 1973

== Notable people ==
The law school has an extensive alumni network in California, particularly the San Francisco Bay Area, that includes general counsels, law firm partners, politicians, judges and corporate executives. Notable alumni include Kamala Harris, the 49th vice president of the United States; George R. Roberts, a founding member of the private equity firm Kohlberg Kravis Roberts; Alexander Francis Morrison, the founding member of the international law firm Morrison & Foerster; William H. Orrick, the founding member of the international law firm Orrick, Herrington & Sutcliffe; and Todd Machtmes, the general counsel of Salesforce.

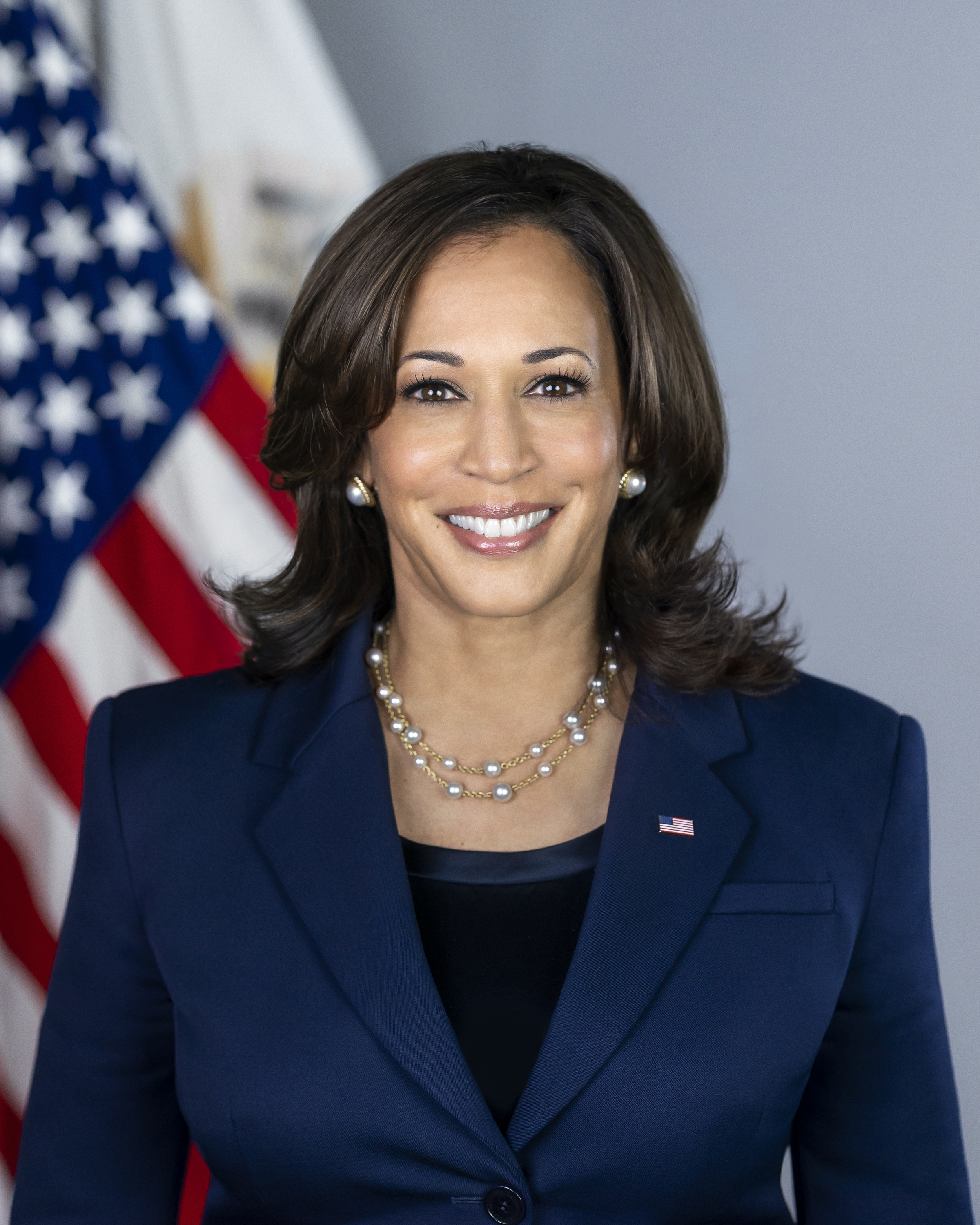
49th vice president of the United States Kamala Harris

Some of the notable graduates of UC Law SF include:

- Marvin Baxter, former California Supreme Court associate justice
- Dan M. Berkovitz, general counsel of the U.S. Securities and Exchange Commission
- Richard Bryan, former Governor of Nevada
- Peter Buxtun (deceased), epidemiologist and Tuskegee Syphilis Study whistleblower
- Carol Corrigan, California Supreme Court associate justice
- Edward Davila, judge of the U.S. District Court for the Northern District of California
- Kamala Harris, 49th vice president of the United States
- Gregg Jarrett, Fox News anchor
- Wiley Manuel, former California Supreme Court associate justice (and first African American justice to serve on that court).
- Thomas Mesereau, prominent criminal defense attorney best known for defending Michael Jackson in his 2005 trial
- Lawrence J. O'Neill, inactive senior judge of the U.S. District Court for the Eastern District of California
- Chip Pashayan, former U.S. Congressman
- Jackie Speier, former U.S. Congresswoman
- J. Christopher Stevens (deceased), U.S. Ambassador to Libya (during 2012)
- Richard Thalheimer, founder of The Sharper Image (in business 1977 - closed in 2008)

== See also ==
- Christian Legal Society v. Martinez, a 2010 U.S. Supreme Court case, arose from events at UC Law SF in 2003.
