= John C. Houlihan =

American politician (1910–1986)

43rd Mayor of Oakland, California
- In office July 1, 1961 – April 30, 1966
- Preceded by: Clifford E. Rishell
- Succeeded by: John H. Reading

Personal details
- Born: October 31, 1910 San Francisco, California, United States
- Died: July 31, 1986 (aged 75) Santa Rosa, California, United States

John C. Houlihan (October 31, 1910 – July 31, 1986) was a Republican who became the 43rd mayor of Oakland, California.

He was elected mayor in 1961, through his defeat of incumbent Mayor Clifford E. Rishell, and was subsequently re-elected to a second, four-year term of office in 1965. He resigned in 1966 after being charged with embezzlement. Houlihan was sent to prison for more than two years after pleading guilty to taking almost $100,000 from an estate he was handling as an attorney. He was paroled in 1969 and pardoned by Ronald Reagan in 1973.

Houlihan died at age 75 after a lengthy illness.
