= Caus =

Caus or CAUS may refer to:

- Club Atlético Unión Santiago
- CAUS or Virginia Tech College of Architecture and Urban Studies
- Causal case or causative case
- Council of Alberta University Students
- The Color Association of the United States
- Citizens Against UFO Secrecy
- Salomon de Caus (1576–1626), French engineer
- Caus Castle, the head of a Welsh marcher lordship, but now part of Shropshire
- Kaous, a town in ancient Greece
- Çavuş, Turkish title
