= Gina Kaus =

American novelist (1893–1985)

- Born: Regina Wiener; October 21, 1893; Vienna, Austria-Hungary
- Died: December 23, 1985 (aged 92); Los Angeles, California, United States
- Occupations: Novelist, screenwriter
- Years active: 1933–1975
- Spouse(s): Josef Zirner (1913–1915; his death); Otto Kaus (1920-1926; divorced)
- Children: Otto Kaus; Peter E. Kaus

Gina Kaus (born Regina Wiener; 21 October 1893, Vienna, Austria – 23 December 1985, Los Angeles, California) was an Austrian-American novelist and screenwriter.

== Life and career ==
Regina Wiener, the daughter of money broker Max Wiener, attended an all-girls school. Regina married the Viennese musician Josef Zirner in 1913, but he died in 1915 on the battlefield in World War I. She was the mistress and common law wife of the banker Josef Kranz and used the last name Zirner-Kranz. Four years later, 1920, she married the writer Otto Kaus, but the couple divorced in 1926, after the birth of two sons, Otto Kaus, a California Supreme Court Associate Justice, and Peter.

In the twenties, Gina Kaus published her first novel The Rise, which won the Theodor Fontane Prize, and was very active in the circle of literary intellectuals in Berlin and Vienna. She had friendships with both Austrian writers Karl Kraus and a romance with Otto Soyka; in her autobiography she would write "... I had a lover, I am not loved." In 1933 she would watch both their books fall victim to the Nazi book burnings.

In March 1938, Kaus moved from Vienna via Zurich to Paris. In Paris she wrote two screenplays from her play Gefängnis ohne Gitter and her novel Die Schwestern Kleeh, which became the popular movies Prison sans barreaux and Conflict, both starring Corinne Luchaire. Later the same year Prison sans barreaux was remade into the British film Prison Without Bars with Luchaire reprising her original part. One year later Prison Without Bars was shown as a BBC live television broadcast with Nova Pilbeam in the leading role.

At the outbreak of World War II in September 1939, Gina Kaus emigrated to the United States. After a few months in New York, she settled in Hollywood in November 1939. She wrote many scripts there and would not return to Vienna until 1948 and visit Berlin until 1951.

In 1956. Kaus's 1940 novel Devil Next Door was made into the film Devil in Silk by director Rolf Hansen, starring Lilli Palmer and Curt Jürgens.

In 1979, Kaus wrote an autobiography published in Germany as Und was für ein Leben...mit Liebe und Literatur, Theater und Film.

Gina Kaus wrote some of her works under the pseudonym, "Andreas Eckbrecht".

She died in Los Angeles in 1985.

Her grandson is pundit Mickey Kaus.

== Works ==
=== Stageplays ===
- Diebe im Haus (Thieves in the House) (1917)
- Der lächerliche Dritte (The Ridiculous Third) (1926)
- Toni - Eine Schulmädchenkomödie in zehn Bildern (Toni: A Schoolgirl Comedy in Ten Pictures) (1927)
- Gefängnis ohne Gitter (Prison Without Bars) (1936)
- Schrift an der Wand (Writing on the Wall) (1937)
- Whisky und Soda (Whisky and Soda) (1937)
- Die Nacht vor der Scheidung (The Night Before the Divorce, based on the novel Morgen um Neun) (1937)

=== Fiction ===
- Der Aufstieg (The Rise) (1920)
- Die Verliebten (The Lovers) (1928)
- Die Überfahrt / Luxusdampfer - Roman einer Überfahrt (Luxury Liner) (1932)
- Morgen um Neun (Tomorrow We Part) (1932)
- Die Schwestern Kleh (Dark Angel) (1933)
- Der Teufel nebenan (Melanie / Devil Next Door) (1940)

=== Non-fiction ===
- Katharina die Große (Catherine: The Portrait of an Empress) (1935)
- Und was für ein Leben...mit Liebe und Literatur, Theater und Film, (And what a life ... with love and literature, theatre and film) (1979) - autobiography

=== Film credits ===
- Luxury Liner (1933), (novel Die Überfahrt)
- Prison sans barreaux (1938), (play Gefängnis ohne Gitter)
- Conflict (1938) (novel Die Schwestern Kleh)
- Prison Without Bars (1938), (play Gefängnis ohne Gitter)
- Prison Without Bars (1939), BBC live television broadcast (play Gefängnis ohne Gitter)
- Charlie Chan in City in Darkness (1939), play
- Western Mail (1942), story
- The Night Before the Divorce (1942), (play Die Nacht vor der Scheidung)
- The Wife Takes a Flyer (1942), screenplay, story
- They All Kissed the Bride (1942), story
- Isle of Missing Men (1942), (play White Lady)
- Blazing Guns (1943), story
- Camino del infierno (1946), writer
- Her Sister's Secret (1946), (novel Die Schwestern Kleh)
- Whispering City (1947), additional dialogue
- Julia Misbehaves (1948), adaptation
- The Red Danube (1949), screenplay
- Three Secrets (1950), story "Rock Bottom", uncredited
- We're Not Married! (1952), story
- All I Desire (1953), writer
- The Robe (1953), adaptation
- Devil in Silk (1956), (novel Der Teufel nebenan)
- Alfred Hitchcock Presents (1956), 1 episode
- The Night of the Storm (1957), writer
- Das Schloß in Tirol (1957), writer
- Schlitz Playhouse of Stars (1957), 1 episode
- Geu yeojaui joiga anida (It's Not Her Sin) (1959), novel
- Der Tag danach (1965, TV film), writer
- Die skandalösen Frauen (1993), (novel Die Schwestern Kleh)
