= Mickey Kaus =

American journalist, pundit, and author

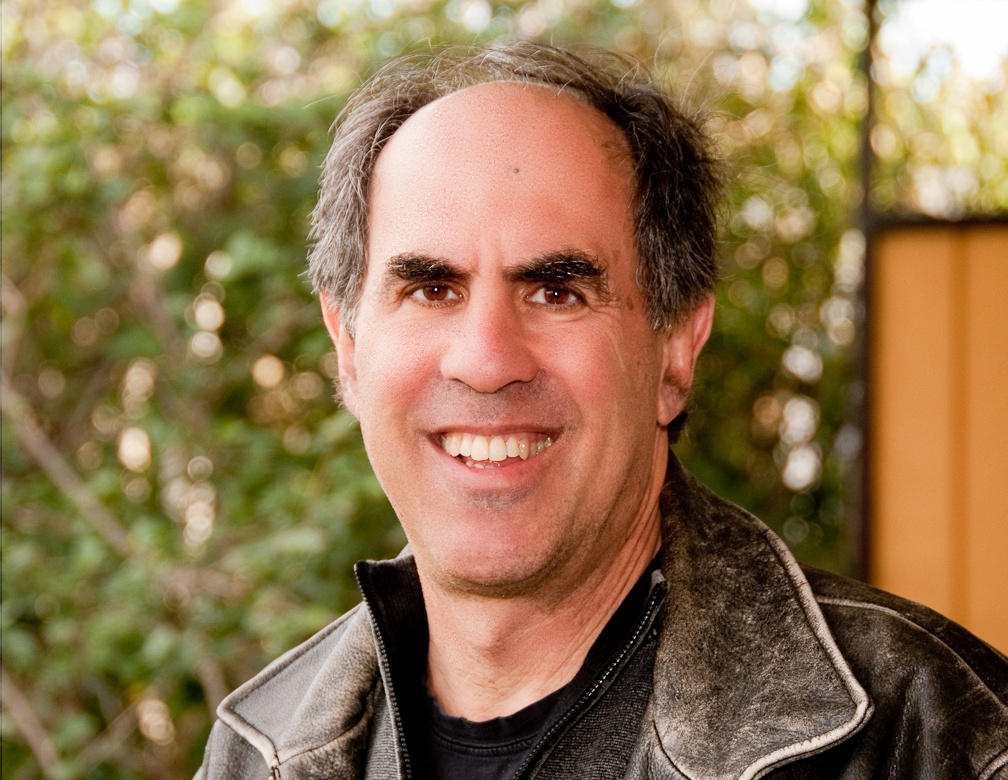
- Kaus in 2009
- Born: Robert Michael Kaus; July 6, 1951 (age 75); Santa Monica, California, U.S.
- Other name: "Mickey" Kaus
- Education: Harvard University (BA, JD)
- Occupations: author, journalist, blogger
- Notable credit(s): noted blogger; author of several books; on-air personality for several audio and video media outlets; published journalist for Newsweek, The New Republic and Washington Monthly, among other places
- Relatives: Stephen Kaus, brother Peter E. Kaus (uncle)
- Website: http://www.kausfiles.com

Robert Michael "Mickey" Kaus (/ˈkaʊs/; born July 6, 1951) is an American journalist, pundit, and author, known for writing Kausfiles, a "mostly political" blog which was featured on Slate until 2010. Kaus is the author of The End of Equality and had previously worked as a journalist for Newsweek, The New Republic, and Washington Monthly, among other publications.

== Personal life ==
Kaus was born in Santa Monica, California, the son of Peggy A. (Huttenback), a civic activist, and Otto Kaus, a Democrat and California Supreme Court Associate Justice. His brother, Stephen Kaus, is a California Superior Court judge and occasional commentator on The Huffington Post. His paternal grandmother was novelist and screenwriter Gina Kaus. His father was born in Vienna, Austria, and his mother was born in Germany and raised in England. His parents were both from Jewish families. Kaus attended Harvard College and Harvard Law School but has never practiced law. He currently resides in Venice Beach, California.

== Kausfiles ==
Kaus first wrote Slate's "Chatterbox" column in 1997 but started Kausfiles in 1999 as a private blog. In 2002, he returned to Slate at the invitation of editor Michael Kinsley. During 2003, the daily readership of Kausfiles varied between 15,000 and 30,000.

Stylistically the blog was most notable for its interior monologues including the ruse of a non-existent editor, as well as frequent, ironic exclamation points. Media critic James Wolcott, in his book Attack Poodles and Other Media Mutants, used Kaus as the archetypal example of a type of pundit he labels "counterintuitives". This type of pundit goes out of his way to stake out positions which run counter to conventional wisdom.

During the 2003 California recall, Kausfiles uncovered an interview with Arnold Schwarzenegger by Oui magazine in which he boasted of participating in group sex. This post sparked a series of claims of sexual misconduct during Schwarzenegger's bodybuilding and acting career. Kaus later posted about a 1981 Today Show appearance where Schwarzenegger claimed that he deliberately damaged chimneys in order to boost demand for his bricklaying business, which was another scoop.

During the 2004 U.S. presidential election, the blog displayed a strong and consistent distaste for John Kerry, despite the fact that Kaus endorsed Kerry and contributed to his campaign. Kausfiles has also consistently criticized the Los Angeles Times, Santa Monica radio station KCRW, media critic Howard Kurtz, and CNN President Jonathan Klein.

In 2007, Kaus reported from an anonymous source that candidate John Edwards was having an affair with documentarian Rielle Hunter. Edwards and Hunter both publicly denied this, and Kaus was widely criticized for what amounted to an assumption of guilt. The affair later proved to be true.

The blog also commented on the automotive industry and Kaus irregularly filed automotive-centric "Gearbox" columns on Slate.

As a result of his 2010 run for the Senate, Kaus left Slate and hosted his blog on his campaign website. On September 20, 2010, the Kausfiles blog was relaunched at Newsweek. Kaus was fired from Newsweek and later blogged at The Daily Caller.

== Resignation from The Daily Caller ==
In March 2015, Kaus quit The Daily Caller after its editor, Tucker Carlson refused to run a column by Kaus that was critical of Fox News coverage of the immigration policy debate. Carlson, who also worked for Fox, reportedly did not want the Caller publishing criticism of a firm that employed him.

== Political views ==
External videos
- Booknotes interview with Kaus on The End of Equality, August 23, 1992, C-SPAN

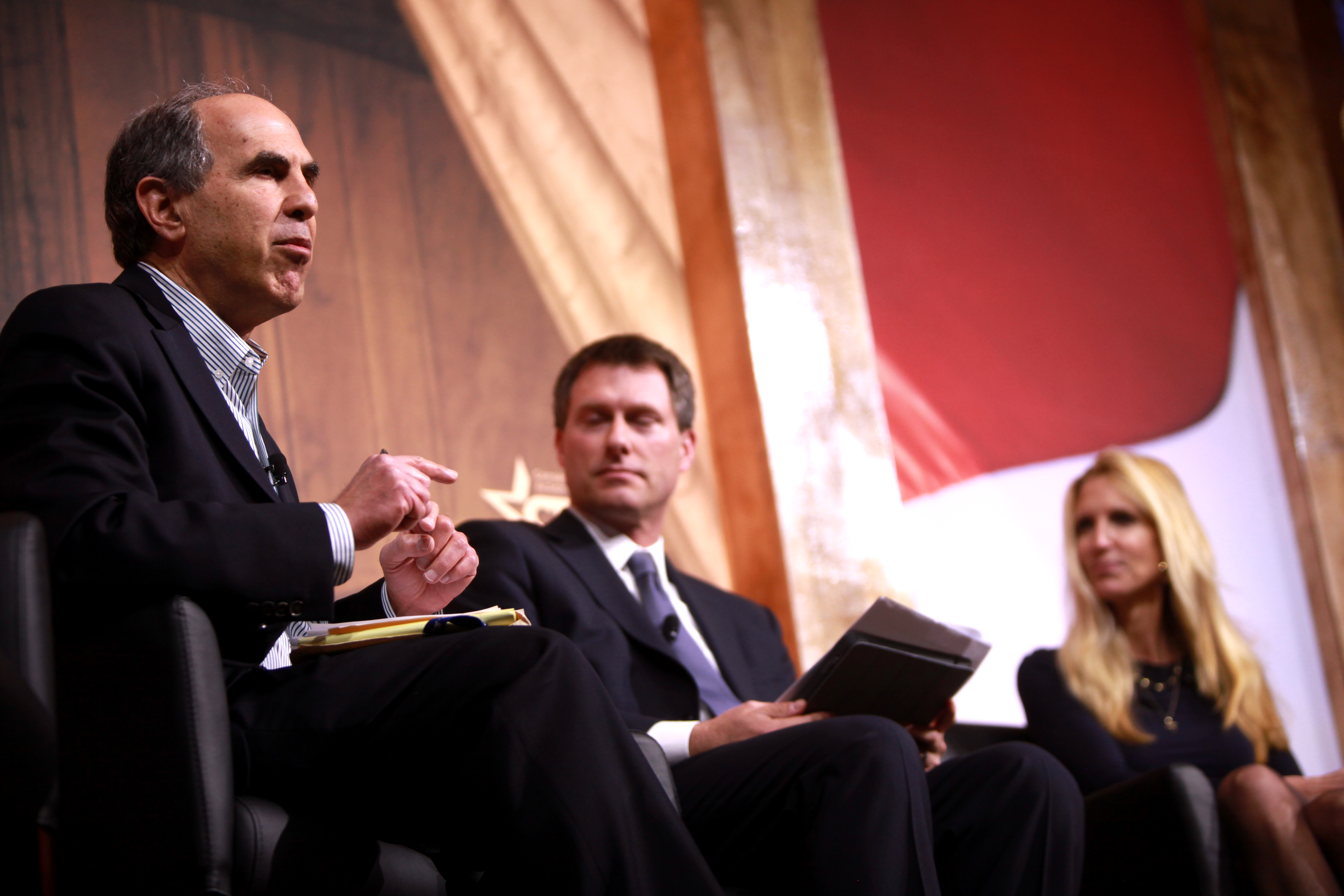
Kaus debating Ann Coulter at the 2014 Conservative Political Action Conference (CPAC) in March 2014.

Kaus was an influential proponent of welfare reform in the 1980s, and is a fierce critic of both labor unions (particularly automotive workers' unions and teachers' unions) and low-skilled immigration (he supports the 2010 Arizona anti-illegal-immigration law, calling to wait to see the law's practical effects before overturning it).

Kaus' constant criticisms of liberalism have led liberals (including his Bloggingheads.tv sparring partner Robert Wright) and conservatives to see him as a right-winger. He has been criticized for his persistent defense of his friend Ann Coulter from many liberal critics.

During the 2008 presidential campaign, Kaus endorsed Hillary Clinton for president, while criticizing other Democrats including Barack Obama. In the 2006 U.S. Midterm Elections Kaus wrote that he hoped the Democrats would fail to take over the U.S. House of Representatives but take the Senate. He called the election "perverse" because he saw a Democratic victory as not impeding George W. Bush's Iraq policy but helping his immigration policy. Nevertheless, Kaus declared he still voted for Democrat Jane Harman.

In 2020, he stated that he had voted for Trump in 2016, but would prefer a more electable Trumpist Kaus is generally moderate on foreign policy (he is notably dovish on issues pertaining to the Middle East).

== Radio ==
Kaus has also contributed to radio, making occasional contributions to the Slate/NPR show Day to Day.

== Bloggingheads.tv ==
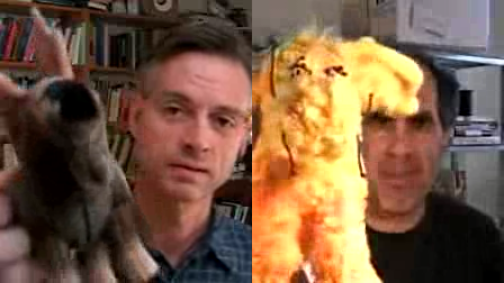
Kaus and Robert Wright comparing stuffed moose visual aids on Bloggingheads.tv.

On November 1, 2005, Kaus and journalist Robert Wright launched BloggingHeads.tv, a video weblog dialog or dia-vlog focusing on mostly-political current events. Initially Kaus and Wright were the regular participants. Eventually Wright recruited many other bloggers, journalists and scholars to take part, discussing the headlines and latest developments and making predictions. Wright, who bought out Kaus in the early days of the site, still appears often with various guests. By contrast, Kaus's appearances became increasingly infrequent. In 2020, Kaus once again became a weekly guest on Wright's show. Their conversations now include a bonus segment called "The Parrot Room" which is only available to patrons of the show.

To exploit the visual side of the medium, Kaus sometimes uses visual aids such as an Al Gore mask and a stuffed moose. According to Kaus "Deploying the moose" symbolizes Pinch Sulzberger's idea of "the unaddressed important issue" similar to the "elephant in the room."

In an episode recorded February 8, 2006, Kaus said "half the Democrats are going to vote for McCain and I'm going to be one of them." Kaus linked to his own statement in a February 10, 2008 blog post with the words, "I can't believe I said this."

== 2010 Senate run ==
According to a March 1, 2010 report in LA Weekly, Kaus took out papers to run for the United States Senate. Kaus ran as a "Common Sense Democrat," stating that he did not expect to win, but hoped to raise issues.

In a March 2, 2010 entry on Kausfiles, Kaus announced that he had taken out nomination papers to run in the Senate primary for California against Barbara Boxer.

Kaus finished a distant third in the June 8, 2010 Democratic primary election, with 5.3% of the total vote (or 94,298 votes). Political unknown Brian Quintana took second with 14.2%, while incumbent Barbara Boxer secured 80.5%, ensuring that she would continue on to the general election.
