= Killing of Douglas Zerby =

Unlawful police killing of 32-year-old man in California

- Date: December 12, 2010; 15 years ago
- Time: 4:45 pm (PST)
- Location: Ocean Boulevard, Long Beach, California, U.S.
- Type: Homicide by shooting, police killing
- Participants: Victor Ortiz and Jeffrey Shurtleff (shooters)
- Deaths: Douglas Zerby
- Charges: None
- Litigation: Zerby's family awarded $6.51 million in lawsuit against the officers and the city of Long Beach

The killing of Douglas Zerby occurred on December 12, 2010, in Long Beach, California. Zerby, who was unarmed, was shot twelve times by two Long Beach Police Department officers while playing with a garden hose nozzle. They claimed that they mistook the hose nozzle for a gun and fired at Zerby, killing him, and did not make any verbal warnings or commands. It was later discovered through audio recordings of the officers radios that a house phone rang, startling an officer causing him to shoot. The other officers fired once the first shooter did, blaming it on "contagious fire," proving the officers, were not trained well.

Los Angeles County prosecutors cleared the two officers of the shooting. The family of Zerby filed a lawsuit against the city of Long Beach and was awarded $6.5 million after a jury found the Long Beach Police Department to be responsible for Zerby's death, acting with malice and recklessness, and violating Zerby's Fourth Amendment rights. The officers also had to pay $5,000 each to Zerby's family.

== Backgrounds ==
Douglas Marthew Zerby (October 4, 1975 - December 12, 2010) was 35 years old and had an eight-year-old son.

The two officers, Jeffrey Shurtleff and Victor Ortiz, had six years and ten years of law enforcement experience, respectively.

== Shooting ==
At 4:45 pm, LBPD Officers Jeffrey Shurtleff and Victor Ortiz shot Zerby as he was sitting on a step of an apartment complex in the Belmont Shore neighborhood playing with a hose nozzle. He was at the apartment to visit his friend. A neighbor had called the police reporting that a man had a "six-shooter" gun in a backyard and was waving it around. Zerby was drunk with a blood alcohol content of 0.42 percent and was reportedly pointing the nozzle at the officers who arrived at the scene, according to authorities. The two officers claimed to have mistaken the device for a gun and opened fire without warning. The officers fired a shotgun and a handgun, hitting Zerby 12 times. Zerby suffered from four fatal wounds. He was struck in the lower leg and chest areas.

Ortiz was 38 feet away from Zerby when he fired his shotgun, and Shurtleff was 23 feet away when he fired his handgun. A third officer who was present at the scene of the shooting was 56 feet away with a telescopic rifle but did not fire. A fourth officer at the scene was armed with an assault rifle and said that he saw Zerby point a firearm in his direction, but not at Ortiz. He was separated from Zerby by a gate and said in his testimony that he did not fire because he did not want to hit the fence.

Immediately before the shooting, officers requested additional helicopters, a police helicopter, and the Long Beach Police Department's Mental Health Evaluation Team to assist in the situation, but claimed that when Zerby stretched his arms and pointed the nozzle at them, they heard a telephone ring and fired. Forensics reports would prove their claims false once it was discovered that the water nozzle was found under his thigh, a place it could never have ended up if he were extending it outward like a pistol.

== Legal proceedings ==
=== Criminal investigation ===
The shooting was investigated by the Long Beach Police Department, the Los Angeles County District Attorney's Justice System of Integrity Division, and the Los Angeles County coroner's office. In November 2011, the Los Angeles County district attorney's office declined to file charges against Ortiz and Shurtleff in the shooting, citing that they acted in self-defense. The decision led to protests in Long Beach. According to prosecutors, Zerby's arm positions were consistent with someone pointing an object at officers.

Police Chief Jim McDonnell said in a press conference that the officers did not give verbal warnings or commands before shooting Zerby.

=== Civil lawsuit ===
Douglas Zerby's family and their lawyers, Dale Galipo and Bryan Claypool, filed a lawsuit against the city of Long Beach and Victor Ortiz and Jeffrey Shurtleff. They asked for $21.5 million in damages.

Roger Clark, a former lieutenant with the Los Angeles County Sheriff's Department, testified that the officers did not need to shoot Zerby and had no reason to not give him an opportunity to drop the nozzle before using deadly force. Clark said that the officers had good cover from brick walls and a fireplace, and that because Zerby had committed no crime, it would be reasonable of the officers to have announced their presence.

An attorney for the city argued that Ortiz and Shurtleff opened fire because they believed that Zerby was going to shoot them. An attorney for Zerby's father said that Shurtleff accidentally discharged his handgun and fired one shot, causing Ortiz to believe Zerby fired a shot and then fire his shotgun.

The jury awarded Zerby's family $6.5 million in wrongful-death damages. $2 million of the judgment was awarded to Zerby's father, Mark, while the remaining $4.5 million will be shared by Zerby's mother, Pamela Amici, and his son, River.

The verdict was affirmed on appeal.
