= Stephen Kaus =

Judge of the Alameda County Superior Court
- Incumbent
- Assumed office November 21, 2012
- Appointed by: Jerry Brown

Personal details
- Born: 1948 (age 77–78)
- Party: Democratic
- Education: University of California, Los Angeles; University of California, Berkeley

Stephen Kaus is a judge in the Alameda County Superior Court, Oakland, California, appointed by Governor Jerry Brown, effective December 2012. Previous to his appointment Kaus was a partner practicing civil litigation attorney at Cooper, White & Cooper LLP in San Francisco, California and an occasional blog commentator on The Huffington Post. He is also the brother of journalist Mickey Kaus.

== Education ==
Kaus received his B.A. degree in political science, cum laude, from the University of California at Los Angeles in 1970. He also studied politics for a year at the University of Sussex. He received his J.D. degree from the University of California at Berkeley, Boalt Hall School of Law in 1973.

== Career ==
Kaus began his law career as a deputy public defender for Contra Costa County California from 1974 to 1980. He then moved to work as a partner at Kaus Kerr and Wagstaffe from 1982 to 1990, before starting a solo practice until 1993. He then served as a lawyer at Cooper White and Cooper LLP, making partner in 1995.

Kaus was appointed as a Superior Court Judge in 2012 after a county commissioner's spot was converted. He then ran unopposed on a 2014 ballot, with his current term set to expire in 2021.
