= Joseph Grodin =

American judge (1930–2025)

Joseph Raymond Grodin

Associate Justice of the California Supreme Court
- In office December 27, 1982 – January 5, 1987
- Appointed by: Governor Jerry Brown
- Preceded by: Frank C. Newman
- Succeeded by: David N. Eagleson

Presiding Justice of the California Court of Appeal, First District, Division Two
- In office March 1982 – December 26, 1982
- Appointed by: Governor Jerry Brown

Associate Justice of the California Court of Appeal, First District, Division One
- In office July 1979 – March 1982
- Appointed by: Governor Jerry Brown
- Preceded by: New seat

Personal details
- Born: Joseph Raymond Grodin; August 30, 1930 Oakland, California, U.S.
- Died: April 6, 2025 (aged 94) Oakland, California
- Party: Democratic
- Education: University of California, Berkeley (BA); Yale Law School (LLB); London School of Economics (PhD)

Joseph Raymond Grodin (August 30, 1930 – April 6, 2025) was an American lawyer and law professor. He served as a Presiding Justice of the California Court of Appeal and an associate justice of the Supreme Court of California. Grodin lost his Supreme Court seat in a contentious 1986 retention election that also removed Justice Cruz Reynoso and Chief Justice Rose Bird.

== Background ==
Grodin was born in Oakland, California on August 30, 1930. Grodin's father had emigrated from Vilkaviškis, Lithuania where his own father and grandfather had been rabbis. The family owned a successful men's clothing store on Broadway known as Schwartz & Grodin. Grodin went to Sunday school at Temple Sinai and graduated in 1948 from Piedmont High School, where he played fullback on the football team. Three years later Grodin graduated from the University of California, Berkeley with honors. While at Cal, Grodin was on the debate team with fellow future California Supreme Court Justice Allen Broussard. Grodin enrolled in a Harvard Ph.D. program to pursue his interest in political economy but local labor lawyer and future Justice Mathew Tobriner encouraged him to go to law school first.

In 1951, Grodin matriculated at Yale Law School, with future Circuit Judge Stephen Reinhardt, future Justice Ellen Ash Peters and future congressman Allard K. Lowenstein as classmates. He studied contracts under Friedrich Kessler, civil procedure under Circuit Judge Charles Edward Clark, property under Myres S. McDougal, equity under Circuit Judge Jerome Frank, arbitration under Wesley Alba Sturges, future interests under Ashbel Green Gulliver, philosophy under F. S. C. Northrop and jurisprudence under Felix S. Cohen. No other students enrolled in community property so the professor only met with him twice, once to tell him he could find books on the subject in the library, and next to tell him to write the exam questions then answer them. During both summers Grodin returned to work in Tobriner's labor law practice. Grodin graduated cum laude in 1954.

Worried about Yale's lack of emphasis on black letter law, Grodin hired Bernard E. Witkin to tutor him for the California Bar Exam. Grodin next received a Fulbright grant to study at the London School of Economics under Otto Kahn-Freund. He would extend the grant to finish a Ph.D. so as to get a draft exemption from the Korean War.

Grodin died on April 6, 2025, at the age of 94.

== Professional life ==
=== Legal practice ===
Grodin returned to California in 1955 and joined Tobriner's law firm focusing on labor law. His clients included union boss David Dubinsky. In 1959, Grodin became a partner after both Tobriner and Leland Lazarus were appointed to the bench by Governor Pat Brown. Grodin began teaching labor law part-time at University of California, Hastings College of Law. Wanting to visit his close friend, future Justice Hans A. Linde, in 1970 Grodin took a year off from the firm to teach at the University of Oregon School of Law. When Grodin returned to San Francisco he began teaching full-time at UC Hastings.

The California Agricultural Labor Relations Board had just been created after a hard-fought campaign by Cesar Chavez and California Secretary of Agriculture Rose Bird. Governor Jerry Brown, a Yale Law School graduate who clerked for Justice Tobriner, needed a Teamsters voice on the board so he appointed Grodin, serving alongside future Cardinal Roger Mahony. Relations were contentious; the board was picketed by opposing sides at the same time and was shouted down in a Teamsters hall in Salinas, California. When the legislature stopped paying board members, Grodin resigned. Regardless, in July 1979 Governor Brown appointed Grodin to a newly created seat on Division One of the California Court of Appeal, First District.

=== Judicial service ===
When Grodin displayed unfamiliarity with the California Penal Code at his first writ conference, Justice John Racanelli suggested he needed to "do a little homework." Grodin was further humbled when he had to dissent in the first labor case he heard, despite citing a book he had written on the topic. Governor Brown promoted Grodin to Presiding Justice on Division Two of the California Court of Appeal, First District, in March 1982. While in Sacramento, defense attorney Terence Hallinan convinced Grodin to give notorious farm worker serial killer Juan Corona a new trial. Affirming the judgment, the Supreme Court largely quoted from Grodin's opinion.

Governor Brown appointed Grodin to the California Supreme Court in December 1982. With Grodin, Governor Brown had appointed all but two of the court's justices. When Grodin and a bare majority of the court found the Federal Arbitration Act did not apply to California's franchising statute, he was reversed by the U.S. Supreme Court in Southland Corp. v. Keating (1982). On the court, Grodin compiled a solid liberal record, voting mostly with Chief Justice Rose Bird. He was considered supportive of trial lawyers and defense attorneys, while seeming skeptical of law enforcement and business interests. He opposed the death penalty.

When the court abolished the death penalty in People v. Anderson (1972) the electorate restored it with California Proposition 17 (1972) and expanded it with California Proposition 7 (1978). While the court upheld Proposition 17, now Chief Justice Rose Bird and Justice Torbriner dissented. Nevertheless, Chief Justice Bird, a former public defender, voted to reverse every single one of the more than 60 death penalty cases she heard, usually joined by Justices Cruz Reynoso, Allen Broussard, and Grodin. She dissented from allowing a victims' rights amendment to the constitution, Proposition 8 (1982), to even appear on the ballot. After it passed, Justice Grodin dissented in part along with Chief Justice Bird when a bare majority of the court upheld the proposition.

After the electorate exercised a 1982 veto referendum against what voters saw as Brown's gerrymandered redistricting plan, a bare majority of the court ordered the governor's plan to be used anyway. Grodin joined the majority blocking voters' subsequent attempt to redistrict directly through a 1983 proposition, even as dissenting Justice Frank K. Richardson inveighed the court "slams the door to the polling place in the face of the people". The court was attacked for these rulings as being partisan and overly political. Grodin joined the liberal majority when it granted the American Federation of Labor's 1984 original petition to block a balanced budget amendment proposition from appearing on the ballot.

=== Retention election ===
California Supreme Court justices must be confirmed by the electorate at the first election for governor after their appointment. No incumbent had been defeated since Justice Frank G. Finlayson in 1926. Nevertheless, Chief Justice Rose Bird, Jerry Brown's Secretary of Agriculture and a former public defender, was only supported by 51.7% of voters in the 1978 general election, the same ballot that passed Proposition 7.

Newly elected California governor George Deukmejian, elected in 1982 and who as attorney general had voted to approve Grodin's appointment to the appeals and supreme court benches, supported a movement to remove the liberal justices from the Court, based largely on the rulings regarding redistricting, tax reform, and ballot propositions.

Capitalizing on moral panic over the crack epidemic and the public's intense dislike of Jerry Brown, Governor Deukmejian began a campaign to recall "Jerry's Justices" by labeling them soft on crime and overly political in their rulings. California prosecutors, noting that there had been zero executions since the electorate restored the death penalty, released a white paper attacking the justices as biased in favor of criminal defendants and trial lawyers. Commercial attorneys followed, releasing a paper accusing the court of being beholden to big labor.

Grodin had served as treasurer on Eugene McCarthy's presidential campaign and had himself made an unsuccessful run for the Berkeley City Council. He raised money from labor unions and the California Trial Lawyers Association, and the state police union ran a TV ad endorsing Grodin. Nevertheless, he was outspent by his opponents and suffered from a series of TV attack ads highlighting the victims in murder sentences he had overturned. Grodin was removed by the California electorate at his first retention election in 1986. Grodin was supported by 43.4% of voters, while Justice Cruz Reynoso was supported by 39.8%, and Chief Justice Rose Bird was supported by 33.8%. Deukmejian, who had won a reelection rematch in a surprise 61% to 37% landslide, was now free to appoint a majority of the court.

Grodin returned to being a law professor at UC Hastings and wrote extensively about the need to abolish judicial elections.

== Books ==
- California State Constitution: A Reference Guide (Reference Guides to the State Constitutions of the United States). Greenwood Press (1993); ISBN 978-0-313-27228-8
- Collective Bargaining in Public Employment. West Publishing (1993); ISBN 978-0-314-01862-5
- Public Sector Employment: Cases and Materials. West Group Publishing (2004); ISBN 978-0-314-26364-3
- In Pursuit of Justice: Reflections of a State Supreme Court Justice. University of California Press (1989); ISBN 978-0-520-06654-0
- Silver Lake (High Sierra Hiking Guide, No 17). Wilderness Press (1983); ISBN 978-0-89997-027-1

== See also ==
- List of justices of the Supreme Court of California

Legal offices
Preceded by Frank C. Newman	Associate Justice of the Supreme Court of California; 1982–1987	Succeeded by David Eagleson
Preceded by	Presiding Justice of the California Court of Appeal, First District, Division Two; March–December 1982	Succeeded by
Preceded by	Associate Justice of the California Court of Appeal, First District, Division One; July 1979 – March 1982	Succeeded by
