= Frank C. Newman =

American judge

Associate Justice of the Supreme Court of California
- In office July 16, 1977 – December 13, 1982
- Appointed by: Jerry Brown
- Preceded by: Marshall F. McComb
- Succeeded by: Joseph R. Grodin

Dean of UC Berkeley School of Law
- In office 1961–1966
- Preceded by: William Prosser
- Succeeded by: Edward C. Halbach, Jr.

Personal details
- Born: Frank Cecil Newman; July 17, 1917 Eureka, California, U.S.
- Died: February 18, 1996 (aged 78) Oakland, California, U.S.
- Spouse: Frances Williston Burks (m. 1940)
- Education: Dartmouth College (AB); University of California, Berkeley (LLB); Columbia University (LLM, JSD)
- Occupation: Professor; Judge

Frank Cecil Newman (July 17, 1917 – February 18, 1996) was an American law school dean, state supreme court justice, and scholar and advocate of reform in the field of international human rights law. He was the Dean of Berkeley Law School from 1961 to 1966, an Associate Justice of the Supreme Court of California from 1977 to 1982, and Jackson H. Ralston Professor of International Law at Berkeley from 1982 to 1988. Following his retirement, he was professor emeritus at Berkeley.

== Early life and education ==
Frank Cecil Newman was born on 17 July 1917 in Eureka, California, USA. He was educated at South Pasadena High School where he was a member of the class of 1934. He obtained his Bachelor of Arts (A.B.) degree from Dartmouth College in 1938. Newman studied for his Bachelor of Laws (LL.B.) degree at the University of California, Berkeley, graduating in 1941. He and his wife, Frances Williston Burks (January 14, 1915–June 11, 2008), who he had met at Berkeley, married on 14 January 1940 shortly before moving to New York. Their first son, Robert, was born in 1942.

During the Second World War, Newman served in a civilian role in Washington, D.C. (the Office of Price Administration) and with the U.S. Navy's Office of General Counsel. A second child, daughter Julie, was born here in 1945. After his wartime service, Newman returned to the Berkeley Law School (Boalt Hall) and took up a post as a lecturer there in 1946. He followed his first law degree with a master's degree in law (LL.M., 1947) and a doctorate in law (J.S.D., 1953), both from Columbia University, New York. By this time, the family had settled in Orinda, California, and two more children were born: son Ralph (1952) and daughter Holly (1958).

== Career ==
=== Deanship ===
Newman spent most of his career at Berkeley Law School, rising from lecturer to become its dean, succeeding William Lloyd Prosser and holding that role from 1961 to 1966. The memorial article and tribute to Newman published by the University of California in 1996 described him as "the soul of the law school" and "a mainstay of its institutional memory and a key figure in its history". (Note: Further details of Newman's life and career were placed on record in a series of oral history interviews in 1989 and 1991.)

In 1964 Newman chaired the Drafting and Executive Committees of the California Constitution Revision Commission, overseeing the 1972 completion of a thorough revision of the Constitution of California. During the same period, from the mid-1960s onwards, Newman established himself as a "globally respected scholar and defender of human rights". Newman took a "combined activist and academic approach" to international human rights law; examples of issues that he and his students and colleagues raised at the United Nations in Geneva and New York (at the United Nations Commission on Human Rights) include the Greek military junta and the Pinochet regime.

A memorial account delivered by the then Berkeley law dean in 1997 recounted how Newman's work in international human rights law was prompted by a sabbatical year in Geneva, Switzerland, and how on his return he started courses at Berkeley in this area; students and colleagues who were inspired to follow his lead became known as the "Berkeley Crew". Human rights groups Newman worked with included Amnesty International, the American Society of International Law, the International Institute of Human Rights, the United States Institute of Human Rights, the World Affairs Council, and the American Civil Liberties Union.

=== Supreme Court of California ===
Newman was appointed as an associate justice of the Supreme Court of California by Governor Jerry Brown, and served from 16 July 1977 to 13 December 1982. The justices he served with during this period were Mathew Tobriner, Stanley Mosk, William P. Clark, Jr., Frank K. Richardson, Wiley Manuel, Chief Justice Rose Elizabeth Bird, Otto Kaus, Allen Broussard, and Cruz Reynoso. It was stated in Newman's obituary in the New York Times that he "usually sided with the court's liberal majority" and was "known for writing opinions that were unorthodox in style and sometimes extremely short".

Speaking in 1997, one of Newman's staff attorneys described the influence of Newman's work on the California State Constitution, pointing to key opinions Newman had authored "enforcing provisions of the California Declaration of Rights independently of rights under federal law". One of those opinions was written in support of a 1979 decision by the court affirming the right to petition at private shopping centers (Robins v. Pruneyard Shopping Center (1979) 23 Cal. 3d 899). The California Supreme Court's decision was held to be consistent with the United States Constitution by the United States Supreme Court in Pruneyard Shopping Center v. Robins (1980).

=== Professor of International Law ===
Newman resigned from the California Supreme Court in 1982 to return to his work on human rights. He was appointed Jackson H. Ralston Professor of International Law at Berkeley and held that position until 1988 when he retired as emeritus professor. In 1984, Newman became co-chairman of the Peace and Conflict Studies program at Berkeley.

== Honors and works ==
Newman was accorded an honorary doctorate in 1978 from Santa Clara University, and received the 1991 Medal for Excellence from Columbia Law School.

Coursebooks by Newman include International Human Rights: Problems of Law and Policy (with Richard B. Lillich, 1979) and International Human Rights: Policy and Process (with David S. Weissbrodt, 2nd edition 1996). Other work by Newman included federal legislation related to the human rights campaign by President Jimmy Carter.

== Death, tributes and legacy ==
Newman died of heart failure aged 78 on 18 February 1996, in Oakland, California. He was survived by his wife Frances, (Note: Frances Newman died on 11 June 2008 at the age of 94. For details of her life and career, see her obituary in Human Rights Advocates.) and his daughter Holly Newman (Daniels). Those who paid tribute to Newman included the chief justice of the California Supreme Court Malcolm M. Lucas: "Justice Newman's dedication to the betterment of the law and of society benefited not only our judicial system and the people of California, but the international community as well."

The following year, on 6 May 1997, a memorial session of the Supreme Court of California was convened to honor Newman. (Note: Presiding at the court's memorial session was Chief Justice Ronald M. George, together with Associate Justices Stanley Mosk, Joyce L. Kennard, Marvin R. Baxter, Kathryn Werdegar, Ming Chin, and Janice Rogers Brown.) Those present included Newman's widow and daughter, and other family and friends. Those who spoke, following opening remarks by the Chief Justice, were Herma Hill Kay, Dean of Boalt Hall School of Law, staff attorney Guy Coburn who had worked with Newman, and former Associate Justice Cruz Reynoso who had served with Newman and spoke on behalf of the court.

Reynoso, a former student and later friend of Newman, paid tribute to his "love for the beauty of California, whether it be the seashore and beaches of the Monterey Peninsula, or the peacefulness of the wooded Sierras", and recounted his enthusiasm for his life and work. Reynoso recalled the possible influences of the Great Depression and the Second World War from Newman's youth, and closed by quoting the dedication inscribed in International Human Rights (1979): "To all oppressed people everywhere."

In 2006, the Frank C. Newman International Human Rights Law Clinic was established at the University of San Francisco. Like Newman, the students participating in this specialized law clinic present presentations to a range of human rights organisations, including the United Nations Human Rights Council. At the dedication, Newman's widow Frances said:

I know how greatly pleased – and honored – Frank would have been by the advent of this new center. With gratitude, our daughter Holly and I look forward to the years ahead, assured that [...] members of the younger and future generations will continue Frank’s worldwide pursuit of human rights as dedicated and effective torch-bearers."

== Selected publications ==
- Newman, Frank C. (1947). "How Courts Interpret Regulations". Cal. L. Rev. 35 (4): 509–544. doi:10.2307/3477482. JSTOR 3477482.
- Newman, Frank C. (1956). "Two Decades of Administrative Law in California: A Critique". Cal. L. Rev. 44 (2): 190–196. doi:10.2307/3478725. JSTOR 3478725.

== Papers and oral history ==
- The Newman Oral History: An Introduction by Jennifer DeMarco, 1 California Legal History 73 (2006) - introduction
- Justice Frank C. Newman Oral History Interview by Carol Hicke, 1 California Legal History 87 (2006) - edited version
- Frank C. Newman, Oral History Interview (California State Archives State Government Oral History Program) - full version
- Frank C. Newman papers, circa 1950-1990 (Online Archive of California)

== External links and further reading ==
- Frank C. Newman, 1917-1996, photograph (University of California, In Memoriam)
- Justice Frank Newman: Some Reflections by Joseph R. Grodin, 3 California Supreme Court Historical Society Yearbook 165 (1996-1997)
- Creative and Dynamic Strategies for Using United Nations Institutions and Procedures: The Frank Newman File: Chapter 7 (pp. 89–102) from Human Rights from Exclusion to Inclusion; Principles and Practice: An Anthology from the Work of Theo Van Boven (Th C. Van Boven, Martinus Nijhoff Publishers, 2000)
- Frank C. Newman International Human Rights Law Blog (University of San Francisco, California)
- Past & Present Justices. California State Courts.

== See also ==
- List of justices of the Supreme Court of California

Legal offices
Preceded by Marshall F. McComb	Associate Justice of the California Supreme Court; 1977 – 1982	Succeeded by Joseph R. Grodin
