= Amador Valley Joint Union High School District v. State Board of Equalization =

California Supreme Court case

- Supreme Court of California

Decided 1978
- Full case name: Amador Valley Joint Union High School District et al., Petitioners, v. State Board of Equalization et al., Respondents. County of Alameda et al., Petitioners, v. State Board of Equalization et al., Respondents. City and County of San Francisco et al., Petitioners, v. Joseph E. Tinney, as Tax Assessor, etc., et al., Respondents
- Citation(s): 22 Cal.3d 208, 583 P.2d 1281, 149 Cal.Rptr. 239

Holding
- The court confirmed that an initiative may not "revise" California's constitution; however, the Prop 13 did not amount to a revision but an amendment.

Court membership
- Chief Justice: Rose Bird
- Associate Justices: Mathew O. Tobriner, Stanley Mosk, William P. Clark, Jr., Frank K. Richardson, Wiley Manuel, Frank C. Newman

Case opinions
- Majority: Richardson, joined by Tobriner, Mosk, Clark, Manuel, Newman
- Concur/dissent: Bird

Laws applied
- California Constitution

Amador Valley Joint Union High School District v. State Board of Equalization (1978) 22 Cal.3d 208 was a California Supreme Court case, in which the Amador Valley Joint Union High School District challenged the constitutionality of California's Proposition 13, which placed a cap on property taxes.

== Background ==
The proposition limited property tax assessments to the 1975 standard, eliminating $7 billion of the $11.4 billion in property tax revenue collected each year. According to The Washington Post'', the "severe" limitations this imposed on state funding forced local governments and most school districts in California to make "drastic cutbacks." The district held that the measure was "so drastic and far-reaching that it was 'a revision' of the state Constitution and not a mere amendment."

== Decision ==
Ultimately, the district was unsuccessful in its suit. In the ruling written by Justice Frank K. Richardson, the Supreme Court distinguished between "amendment" and "revision." The Court confirmed that an initiative cannot "revise" the constitution; Proposition 13, however, was an amendment to the California Constitution and not a "revision." In 2009, Amador Valley was cited by dissenting Justice Carlos R. Moreno in arguing the non-constitutionality of Proposition 8.
