= California Rural Legal Assistance =

U.S. nonprofit organization

California Rural Legal Assistance Inc
- Abbreviation: CRLA
- Formation: Tax-exempt since May 1967; 59 years ago
- Type: 501(c)(3)
- Headquarters: Modesto, California
- Location: Coachella, Delano, El Centro, Fresno, Lamont, Madera, Marysville, Oxnard, Salinas, San Luis Obispo, Santa Maria, Santa Rosa, Stockton, Tulare, Vista, Watsonville
- Region served: rural California
- Revenue: 34,144,676 USD (2023)
- Expenses: 27,102,309 USD (2023)
- Website: crla.org

California Rural Legal Assistance, Inc. (CRLA) is a 501(c)(3) non-profit legal service organization created to help California's low-income individuals and communities. CRLA represents all types of individuals and communities, including farmworkers, disabled people, immigrant populations, school children, LGBT populations (sexual minorities), seniors, and individuals with limited English proficiency. CRLA's current executive director is Jessica Jewell.

CRLA has 18 offices which serve to meet the legal needs of rural communities from the Mexican border to Northern California. These offices are located in Coachella, Delano, El Centro, Fresno, Lamont, Madera, Marysville, Modesto, Oakland, Salinas, San Luis Obispo, Santa Maria, Santa Rosa, Stockton, Tulare, Vista, Oxnard, and Watsonville. The main administrative office is located in Modesto. Having multiple regional offices allows CRLA to serve clients in their own communities all over the state.

Funding for CRLA comes from multiple sources. As of 2019, approximately 49% of revenue comes from Legal Services Corporation (LSC) grants. State Bar grants make up 17% of its revenue, while other grants make up 24%. Donations make up 4%, and the remaining 6% comes from various sources. 80% of CRLA's expenses are for program services. Management and general expenses make up 12% of the share, while fundraising makes up 4%.

== Services ==
Since 1966, CRLA provides people with a low income, free legal assistance and a variety of community education and outreach programs. Major resources are committed to impact litigation, multi-client cases that seek to address the root causes of poverty. CRLA's legal services include litigation, outreach, and legal education.

In addition to traditional legal representation, CRLA has created a series of special programs and initiatives, which have included a Community Equity Initiative, Indigenous Program, LGBTQ+ Program, Lending Discrimination Project, Rural Education Equity Program, and Rural Health Disparities Program.

== History ==
California Rural Legal Assistance was founded in 1966 by James D. Lorenz under the auspices of President Lyndon B. Johnson's War on Poverty. The first meeting took place on Saturday, May 14, 1966, at 1411 West Olympic Avenue in Los Angeles, California. Those in attendance included, Cruz Reynoso, Cesar Chavez, Larry Itliong, and CRLA Founder, James D. Lorenz.

CRLA was originally funded by the Office of Economic Opportunity (OEO). In his first funding request for CRLA, Lorenz wrote about his vision for CRLA, a "Proposal to aid farm workers and other poor persons residing in the rural areas of California". From the beginning, CRLA offered exemplary legal services at no cost for clients. By the late 1960s, the agency handled about 15,000 cases a year, a third of which were primarily concerned with consumer and employment problems. In addition to lawyers, clerks, and researchers, CRLA employed community workers, most of whom were formerly farm workers, who were the bridge between the agency and the communities they sought to serve.

CRLA's founder and first executive director, James (Jim) D. Lorenz, served from 1966 to 1969. He died January 19, 2017. After graduating from Harvard Law School, Lorenz first worked at a large Los Angeles-based law firm before changing directions and applying for OEO funding for what would soon become CRLA in the spring of 1966. Lorenz was described as an energetic director who recruited iconic United Farm Workers organizers Cesar Chavez and Dolores Huerta to the CRLA Board of Directors. Lorenz was featured in a December 15, 1967, Time magazine article that highlighted CRLA's mission to serve California's labourers and rural poor.

Cruz Reynoso was the second executive director of CRLA from 1969 to 1972. Reynoso faced fierce opposition to CRLA from then-Governor Ronald Reagan. Following CRLA's victory in the 1967 Morris v. Williams case that blocked his welfare cuts, Ronald Reagan appointed Lewis K. Uhler as the director of California's Office of Economic Opportunity with the intent of undermining CRLA and its funding. In 1969, Uhler compiled a politically motivated and false report alleging 127 incidents of misconduct on the part of CRLA. CRLA fought the charges and eventually succeeded in getting them dismissed by a Nixon administration-appointed commission of the chief justices of three state supreme courts. The Uhler Report controversy led to the bipartisan creation of the federal Legal Services Corporation (LSC). The goal of this organization was to reduce state and local government interference under the OEO funding scheme. Throughout his time as president, Reagan continuously attempted to undermine and eliminate the LSC and CRLA. In 1970, Governor Ronald Reagan also vetoed the OEO's $1.8 million grant for CRLA refunding in 1971 due to the apparent (and later determined false) claims of misuse of OEO funds and "its failure to represent the true legal needs of the poor". In 1971, Reynoso and CRLA lawyer Michael Bennett wrote a landmark article for the UCLA Chicana/o-Latina/o Law Review, "CRLA: Survival of a Poverty Law Practice" in which they discussed the opposition faced from Governor Reagan, the Uhler Report controversy, and CRLA's role in serving the poor.

Marty Glick served as the third executive director from 1972 to 1974 after being with CRLA since 1966. It was during this time that CRLA obtained the settlement that effectively ended the Bracero program. CRLA also won the landmark battle to eliminate the usage of el cortito, the short-handed hoe, a back-breaking tool used by agricultural workers.

Alberto Saldamando was executive director of CRLA from 1976 to 1984. As a director, Saldamando oversaw a very diverse organization that represented the client community it sought to serve. By 1979, the staff of over 70 lawyers was 80% Chicano, 10% Asian, Black, and Native American, and 50% female. In fact, the Marysville office at the time was led by an Asian directing attorney and staffed entirely by women. During this era, CRLA faced a series of highs and lows as the right-wing reaction to the 1960s set in and the organization faced congressional restrictions to its impact work. During this time, now President Ronald Reagan continued to oppose CRLA and its mission. Nonetheless, CRLA carried on with its legal and impact work and was able to establish the migrant unit.

Jose Padilla's tenure as executive director was from 1984 to December 2022. Padilla began working at CRLA right out of Berkeley School of Law in 1978 and was promoted from directing attorney of the El Centro office to executive director in 1984. Under Padilla, CRLA was the first legal aid organization to bring sexual harassment litigation. Padilla is also the first legal aid director to testify before Congress, in this case regarding CRLA's efforts to bring justice to California's dairy workers. Like executive directors before him, Padilla also wrote for the UCLA Chicana/o-Latina/o Law Review, titled "California Rural Legal Assistance: The Struggles and Continued Survival of a Poverty Law Practice".

== Notable work and impact ==
=== Morris v. Williams (1967) ===
CRLA's first big win was in the case Morris v. Williams. CRLA brought suit against the Reagan administration to prevent cuts in the governor's budget for the California Medicare matching funds. CRLA fought and won the case, resulting in the restoration of $210 million to the state's Medi-Cal program for the poor and elderly.

=== 1971 pesticide ban ===
In 1971, CRLA forced the federal government to begin hearings, which lead to the banning of the pesticide DDT. At the time, the plaintiffs were six nursing mothers who were also farmworkers. CRLA helped bring to light that the pesticide DDT stays in the body over a long period of time. Therefore, when a woman is nursing, the child can potentially be exposed to this harmful chemical through breast milk.

=== Diana v. Board of Education (1972) ===
In 1972, CRLA helped put a stop to the use of English IQ tests for placing Spanish-speaking children in special education classes. Before this case, 26% of Latino students were being placed in classes for the developmentally disabled. Because of this case, California law now requires schools to test in a child's native language, so no more students will be incorrectly placed into special education classes due to limited ability to speak English.

=== Banning of el cortito (1974) ===
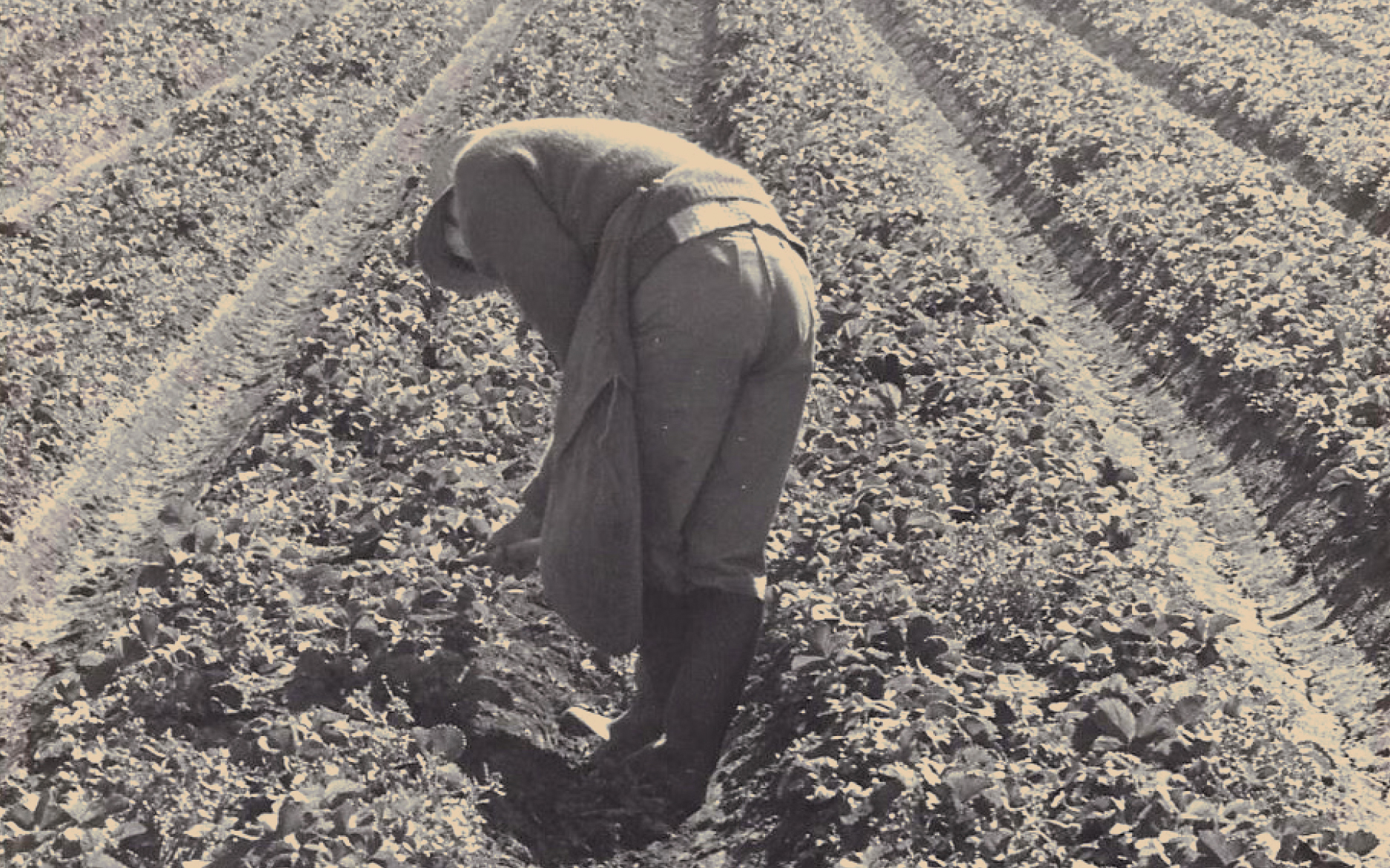

CRLA argued in front of the California Supreme Court and succeeded in banning the use of el cortito, the crippling short-handled hoe. The hoe was 12 to 18 inches long and forced workers to bend over and twist their bodies to harvest. Working in this position for long hours caused permanent back injuries to workers. Activist Cesar Chavez was one of those with permanent back problems caused by his work with el cortito. The evidence showed that the tool caused a 40-year-old farmworker to have the back of a 75-year-old. The evidence also revealed that the long-handled hoe was more efficient. In 1975, the California Supreme Court banned the short-handed hoe in Carmona vs. Division of Industrial Safety, ruling in favour of worker safety. Banning this tool led to farmworker back injuries dropping by 34%.

=== Bilingual Education Act (1975) ===
Issues brought to light in the 1972 Diana case led to California enacting the Bilingual Education Act, of which CRLA was a major sponsor. This was the most comprehensive bilingual education act in the nation. It established bilingual education programs and provided specific guidelines for certifying teachers qualified to provide instruction to English learners.

=== Birth Defect Prevention Act (1983) ===
In 1983, CRLA was instrumental in helping pass the Birth Defect Prevention Act in California, which required pesticide companies to test the harmfulness of their products to human beings.

=== Building new homes (1984) ===
In 1984, California created the CRLA-sponsored Housing Trust Fund, which turns $20 million in offshore oil taxes into funds for low-income housing every year.

=== Amnesty for workers nationwide (1985) ===
In 1985, CRLA drafted the Special Agricultural Worker provision of the new Immigration, Reform and Control Act (IRCA) that created a new category of permanent residents called "amnesty aliens". This helped legalize one million undocumented workers nationwide.

=== Women's health (1990) ===
In the 1990 case Lickness et al. v. Kizer et al., CRLA challenged then-Governor George Deukmejian's $24 million cut to state-funded family planning services provided by community health clinics. CRLA was successful in securing the restoration of $20 million in funding for family planning and health care services for more than 500 health clinics serving nearly 500,000 poor women across the state.

=== Environmental justice (1991) ===
In 1988, CRLA joined forces with the community-based organization El Pueblo Para El Aire y Agua Limpio to challenge the construction of a toxic waste incinerator in Kettleman City. In the case El Pueblo Para el Aire y Agua Limpio v. County of Kings, CRLA argued a lack of public notice and environmental racism. Environmental racism referred to the targeting of a community for exposure to environmental hazards because it is made of up minorities and low-income residents. This case was the first known suit in the nation to charge for environmental racism.

=== Sexual harassment (2002) ===
In 2002, CRLA brought the first sexual harassment case on behalf of a Latina farmworker. The case, EEOC v. Tanimura & Antle, resulted in a $1.8 million dollar settlement and led the U.S. Equal Employment Opportunity Commission to recognize sexual harassment violations in the agricultural industry as a federal agenda item.

=== Bilingual Education Act (2004) ===
In 2004, CRLA advocated to end the U.S. Department of Education's practice of refusing to allocate federal No Child Left Behind money to bilingual classrooms, resulting in millions of dollars for Latino children's education.

=== Dairy industry abuses (2006) ===
In 2006, CRLA recovered more than $1 million dollars in unpaid wages, overtime pay, and penalties from dairies for workers who were forced to labour seven days a week, 12–14 hours a day, for less than $4.35 an hour.

=== Martinez v. Combs (2010) ===
In one of the most important employments cases in California history, CRLA was instrumental in arguing Martinez v. Combs (2010) which resulted in the California Supreme Court defining who is an "employee" for purposes of California wage law. This case will continue to shape the outcome of all wage and hour cases to come and the lives of millions of workers in California.

== Opposition ==
In 2002, Global Exchange, an international San Francisco–based NGO, awarded CRLA the Domestic Human Rights Award.

Between 2000 and 2006, CRLA was investigated six times by LSC or by its inspector general. The subject of the investigations ranged from issues of timekeeping, to facilities sharing, to CRLA affiliations with non-LSC agencies. The CRLA maintained that the investigations were political fallout for obtaining over one million dollars in settlements from dairy farmers.

Padilla contends that organizations such as CRLA are "seemingly singled out for special political harassment, through more intense investigations".

CRLA was also the subject of two complaints from the National Legal and Policy Center, both for apparently "violat[ing] the Legal Services Corporation Act and regulations regarding fee-generating cases".
