= Frank K. Richardson =

American judge (1914-1999)

Frank Kellogg Richardson
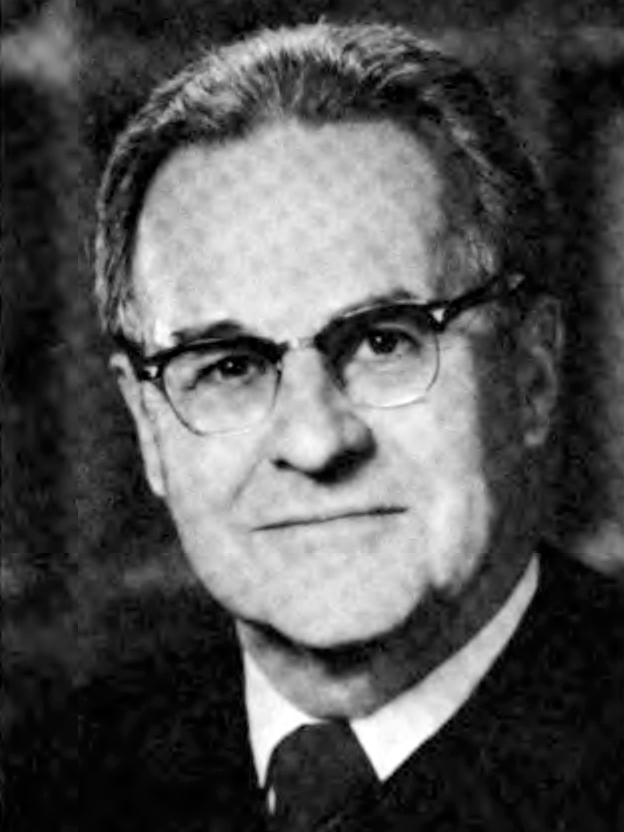

Associate Justice of the Supreme Court of California
- In office December 2, 1974 – December 2, 1983
- Appointed by: Governor Ronald Reagan
- Preceded by: Louis H. Burke
- Succeeded by: Malcolm M. Lucas

Presiding Justice of the California Court of Appeal, Third Appellate District
- In office October 1971 – December 1, 1974
- Appointed by: Governor Ronald Reagan

Personal details
- Born: February 13, 1914 St. Helena, California, U.S.
- Died: October 5, 1999 (aged 85) Sacramento, California, U.S.
- Spouse: Betty Kingdon (m. 1943)
- Education: University of Pennsylvania; Stanford University (AB, LLB)

Frank Kellogg Richardson (February 13, 1914 – October 5, 1999) was an American attorney and Associate Justice of the California Supreme Court.

== Early life and education ==
Born in St. Helena, California, Richardson graduated from Germantown High School in Philadelphia, Pennsylvania. He attended the University of Pennsylvania his freshman year but transferred to Stanford University, where he earned an A.B. with distinction in political science in 1935 and was elected to the Phi Beta Kappa honor society. He then went on to earn his LL.B. from Stanford Law School in 1938.

After being admitted to the California State Bar in 1938, Richardson entered private practice in Oroville sharing office space with retired Butte County Judge Hirman Gregory.

== Military service ==
During World War II, Richardson entered the U.S. Army, serving from 1942 to 1945 in Europe. He trained at Camp Ritchie in its Military Intelligence Training Center and is considered one of the Ritchie Boys. In 1944, Richardson, a second lieutenant in Army Intelligence, was assigned to the top secret Ultra Project at Bletchley Park (north of London), where he learned that British Prime Minister Winston Churchill was scheduled to address the British Parliament on the status of the war effort in the Balkans. Wearing his US Army uniform and using identification papers from the U.S. Embassy, Richardson talked his way through multiple layers of security and was escorted to a seat in the Distinguished Visitors Gallery next to the Archbishop of Canterbury. By the end of the war, he was a First Lieutenant and had been awarded two service stars.

== Judicial career ==
Upon returning to California, Richardson resumed the private practice of law but moved to Sacramento, where he also taught at the McGeorge School of Law from 1946 to 1952. In 1962, he was president of the Sacramento County Bar Association. In 1970, Governor Ronald Reagan appointed Richardson as Sacramento County Superior Court's presiding judge. In October 1971, Governor Reagan appointed Richardson Presiding Justice of the California Third District Court of Appeal. Richardson vacated that post when Reagan appointed him as an Associate Justice of the California Supreme Court in 1974. Reagan had wanted to name Richardson Chief Justice of California that year, but Chief Justice Donald Wright refused to retire because he was "frightened" of the prospect of Richardson as Chief Justice. In November 1978, Richardson stood for reelection and was retained.

While on the court, Richardson wrote 212 dissenting opinions and 182 majority opinions.

Among his 182 majority opinions, Richardson wrote the court's opinions in Daly v. General Motors Corp. (1978) 20 Cal.3d 725, applying comparative fault principles to actions brought in strict product liability; Amador Valley Joint Union High School District v. State Board of Equalization (1978) 22 Cal.3d 208, upholding Proposition 13, the initiative that changed California's property taxation system; Agins v. City of Tiburon (1979) 24 Cal.3d 266, denying the constitutional remedy of just compensations to Property owners alleging uncompensated regulatory takings of their land (overruled by the U.S. Supreme Court in First English etc. Church v. County of Los Angeles (1987) 482 U.S. 304), People v. Scott (1978) 21 Cal.3d 284, outlining the outer limits of searches and seizures of physical evidence from criminal defendants; and Brosnahan v. Eu (1982) 31 Cal.3d 1, upholding Proposition 8, the Victims' Bill of Rights initiative.

In 1979 and 1980, he wrote two bellwether opinions reaffirming the constitutionality of California's death penalty law: People v. Frierson and People v. Jackson (1980); Richardson's opinions helped guide the liberal court toward a judicial acceptance of the death penalty.

Of Richardson's dissenting opinions, many served as models for majority decisions in later years of both the United States Supreme Court and the California Supreme Court.

One example of how Richardson was belatedly vindicated is his dissenting opinion in Royal Globe Ins. Co. v. Superior Court, 23 Cal. 3d 880 (1979), in which he articulated a conservative, strict constructionist theory of statutory interpretation with regard to the question of when a court could find an implied cause of action to enforce a statute. Richardson reasoned that the courts should not imply a private right to sue simply because the legislature had declared certain acts by insurers to constitute unfair claims handling; in his view, the more rational approach was that the legislature's silence on the issue meant it had no intent to create such a right, and in turn, the courts must defer to that decision. He attacked the majority opinion (signed by Stanley Mosk) for judicial activism in making it much easier to sue insurance companies. In 1987, the court suddenly shifted from a liberal to a conservative majority when the electorate voted to eject Chief Justice Rose Bird and two associate justices. In 1988, newly elevated Chief Justice Malcolm M. Lucas wrote a majority opinion in Moradi-Shalal v. Fireman's Fund Ins. Companies, 46 Cal. 3d 287 (1988) that overruled Royal Globe, restored the status quo ante (thereby making it much harder again to sue insurance companies), and adopted the rule articulated by Justice Richardson in his Royal Globe dissent. Justice Mosk filed a dissenting opinion attacking the majority for "exalt[ing] principal over principle."

Finally, in 2010, Associate Justice Ming Chin held for a unanimous court that Justice Richardson's theory, as initially adopted in the context of insurance in Moradi-Shalal, was to retroactively apply to all California statutes, including California Labor Code section 351 (which merely declares that tips are the property of employees but does not create an express right to sue employers for seizing them):

We reject plaintiff's contention that our pronouncements in Moradi-Shalal should be tempered here because the significant amendments to section 351 were passed in 1973 and 1975, well before we decided that case in 1988. Plaintiff asserts that before Moradi-Shalal, the Legislature would have believed "that if they created a property right there was a remedy." First, our holding in Moradi-Shalal that the Legislature must clearly manifest an intent to create a private cause of action under a statute is hardly novel. [Citation.] Second, as relevant here, in Moradi-Shalal, we validated [Justice Richardson's] dissent in Royal Globe Ins. Co. v. Superior Court [citation], which had relied on a 1941 statute (see Bus. & Prof. Code, § 17070), to point out that 'the Legislature was fully capable of writing an unambiguous statute creating civil liability for particular unfair business practices. . . The legislative tools were at hand. They were not used.'

Richardson unsuccessfully attempted to convince his fellow justices to move the Supreme Court from its traditional headquarters in San Francisco to Sacramento, the state's capital city.

In March 1983, Richardson and his wife attended a dinner given in honor of a visit by Queen Elizabeth II to San Francisco.

== Post-judicial career ==
Richardson retired from the Court on December 2, 1983. Upon leaving the court, he served as a distinguished visiting professor of law at Pepperdine University School of Law in the spring 1984 semester. Then, President Reagan appointed Richardson as solicitor to the U.S. Department of the Interior, which was headed at the time by fellow former California Supreme Court Justice William Clark. Richardson left the post in 1985 and became a Nixon Fellow at the Whittier Law School that year.

Richardson died at his Sacramento home of complications from Parkinson's disease on October 5, 1999.

== Personal life ==
While working as an usher at the local Methodist church, Richardson met Betty Kingdon, whom he would marry on January 23, 1943. Their marriage would produce four sons and last for 56 years until Frank Richardson's death in 1999.

== See also ==
- List of justices of the Supreme Court of California

Legal offices
Preceded by Louis H. Burke	Associate Justice of the California Supreme Court; December 2, 1974 – December 2, 1983	Succeeded by Malcolm M. Lucas
Preceded by Fred R. Pierce	Presiding Justice of the California Court of Appeal, Third Appellate District; October 1971 – November 1974	Succeeded by Robert K. Puglia
