= William Lloyd Prosser =

Dean of the School of Law at UC Berkeley

William Prosser

Dean of UC Berkeley School of Law
- In office 1948–1961
- Preceded by: Edwin DeWitt Dickinson
- Succeeded by: Frank C. Newman

Personal details
- Born: March 15, 1898 New Albany, Indiana
- Died: May 21, 1972 (aged 74) Berkeley, California
- Education: Harvard University; University of Minnesota (LLB)
- Occupation: Professor

William Lloyd Prosser (March 15, 1898 – May 21, 1972) was the Dean of the School of Law at UC Berkeley from 1948 to 1961. Prosser authored several editions of Prosser on Torts, universally recognized as the leading work on the subject of tort law for a generation.

The fifth and final edition was published in 1984 with editing by W. Page Keeton, such that is called Prosser and Keeton on Torts. Furthermore, in the 1950s, Prosser (often referred to as "Dean Prosser") became Reporter for the American Law Institute's Second Restatement of Torts.

== Biography ==
William L. Prosser served in the United States Marine Corps during World War I. After the war, he also served as a guard at the US Embassy in Brussels, Belgium After spending his first year at Harvard Law School, Prosser transferred to and received his law degree from the University of Minnesota Law School. After a brief time in private practice at Dorsey, Colman, Barker, Scott & Barber (the modern-day Dorsey & Whitney), he became a professor of law at the University of Minnesota Law School, where he wrote Prosser on Torts. He taught there from 1931 until 1940, when he resigned to become the Minnesota counsel for the Roosevelt Administration's Office of Price Administration. In 1943, he returned to private practice for another four years. In 1947, Prosser returned to Harvard Law School as a professor.

The following year, Prosser became Dean of the School of Jurisprudence at UC Berkeley. The unusual name of Berkeley's law school was a leftover from its beginnings as an undergraduate department, but had not been changed because of existing statutory language designating the Hastings College of Law as the University of California's "law department." After Prosser learned that UCLA had been able to get legislative approval for its own "school of law" (notwithstanding the Hastings statutory language), he decided that Berkeley could also get away with having its own school of law and set about getting the school renamed.

At Berkeley, Prosser was renowned for his sophistication, brilliance, and sense of humor. However, he was also "conservative and pragmatic", and saw no reason in 1949 why anyone should object to taking a loyalty oath. He enjoyed the company of deans L. Dale Coffman at UCLA Law and David E. Snodgrass at Hastings, who shared his conservative views.

By 1960, Prosser's "irascible" and "authoritarian" personality traits were becoming evident. He suddenly announced his resignation, effective immediately, in the middle of the 1960–1961 school year rather than face a regular five-year review of his deanship before the campus Budget Committee, then had to be talked into finishing the school year while the university searched for his replacement. On the way out, he could not resist taking potshots which confirmed his personality flaws, marred his legacy at Berkeley, and were regarded as an unfortunate coda to an otherwise successful deanship. In oral remarks before the faculty, he attacked the institutional weakness of the dean of the law school by calling himself "a straw man, a stooge, a tailor's dummy, and a figurehead, without any authority or power whatsoever". He also made similar comments in a written memorandum to the faculty: "This, of course, is faculty self-government, which is a fetish in this University beyond all others. It is democracy in action. It is also one hell of a way to run a railroad."

Upon leaving Berkeley in 1961, Prosser became a member of the faculty at Hastings and continued to teach law there until his death in 1972. Prosser's attitude toward his profession is reflected in his authorship of several parody songs published in the Law School Association Lyrics by the Association of American Law Schools, including "The Law Dean's Lament" to the tune of "Twenty-One Years" and "Over the Hill To Hastings" to the tune of "Over the Hills to the Poorhouse".

== Prosser and strict products liability ==
Prosser became closely associated with the doctrine of strict liability for products injuries. His first edition of Prosser on Torts in 1941 argued that strict products liability was developing in American law, and predicted that it would be the law of the future. By the time his influential article The Assault on the Citadel (Strict Liability to the Consumer) was published in 1960, the New Jersey Supreme Court fulfilled his prediction, holding in Henningsen v. Bloomfield Motors that manufacturers implicitly warrantied their products against personal injury to all users. As Reporter for the Second Restatement of Torts, he helped codify strict products liability in the Restatement's Section 402A.

In the early 1940s, Prosser prepared the Comments and Notes to the predecessor of the Uniform Commercial Code: Commercial Code, Tentative Draft No. 1 – Article III. His work was limited to sections 1–51 of Article III, which focused primarily on commercial paper.
