= Cruz Reynoso =

American judge (1931–2021)

Associate Justice of the Supreme Court of California
- In office February 11, 1982 – January 4, 1987
- Appointed by: Jerry Brown
- Preceded by: Mathew O. Tobriner
- Succeeded by: Marcus Kaufman

Associate Justice of the California Court of Appeal, Third District
- In office June 1976 – February 11, 1982
- Appointed by: Jerry Brown

Personal details
- Born: May 2, 1931 Brea, California, U.S.
- Died: May 7, 2021 (aged 90) Oroville, California, U.S.
- Party: Democratic
- Spouse(s): Jeannene Harness (m. 1957; died 2007) Elaine Rowen
- Children: 4
- Education: Fullerton College (AA); Pomona College (BA); University of California, Berkeley (LLB)

Military service
- Allegiance: United States
- Branch/service: United States Army
- Years of service: 1953–1955
- Unit: Counterintelligence Corps

Cruz Reynoso (May 2, 1931 – May 7, 2021) was an American civil rights lawyer and jurist.

Reynoso was the first Chicano Associate Justice of the California Supreme Court, serving from 1982 to 1987. He also served on the California Third District Court of Appeal. In 1986, along with two other liberal members of the California Supreme Court—Chief Justice Rose Bird and Associate Justice Joseph Grodin—Reynoso became one of only three State Supreme Court justices ever recalled and removed by voters under California's judicial-retention election system. He served as vice-chairman of the U.S. Commission on Civil Rights from 1993 to 2004.

After leaving the bench, Reynoso spent ten years on the faculty of the UCLA School of Law and five years at the UC Davis School of Law; he was professor emeritus. In 2000, Reynoso received the Presidential Medal of Freedom, the United States' highest civilian honor, for his efforts to address social inequities and his public service.

== Early life and education ==
Reynoso was born in Brea, California on May 2, 1931. He grew up as one of 11 children, and from age eight worked as an agricultural worker in orange groves. His father was a farmworker.

When Reynoso was seven, the family moved to a barrio outside of La Habra, California. While there, he attended the Wilson Grammar School, a racially segregated grade school for children of Mexican descent. His junior high school was integrated, as was Fullerton Union High School, from which he graduated.

The United States Postal Service refused to provide Rural Free Delivery service within the barrio, even though non-minority families living nearby received the service. Reynoso circulated a petition demanding service; the Postal Service responded to his petition and began providing mail delivery to the barrio. He also challenged the local school board about the Wilson School, after which the school was desegregated.

After high school, Reynoso attended Fullerton College, a community college, receiving an associate of arts degree in 1951. A dean from Pomona College offered him a scholarship if he applied and was admitted to that school. He received his Bachelor of Arts degree from Pomona College in 1953, after which he joined the U.S. Army, serving in the Counterintelligence Corps for two years. He was stationed in Washington, D.C., where his assignments included reviewing the House Un-American Activities Committee files on potential applicants for Federal jobs, a task he found distasteful. He received his Bachelor of Laws degree from the University of California, Berkeley, School of Law in 1958. Under a Ford Foundation fellowship, he studied constitutional law at the National University of Mexico in 1958–59.

== Legal career ==
Reynoso began his career in private law practice in El Centro, California. He served as a legislative assistant in the California State Senate (1959–60). He was an Associate General Counsel for the Equal Employment Opportunity Commission in 1967 and 1968.

He then served as deputy director of California Rural Legal Assistance in 1968. Shortly thereafter, internal problems at CRLA led to his assuming the directorship; he was the first Latino to hold the position. His work with CRLA gained him national recognition. Reynoso recalled that, during his tenure, CRLA was "mentioned not infrequently as being the leading legal services program in the country." Then-Governor Ronald Reagan attempted to cut state funding for the CRLA during Reynoso's tenure, but the agency successfully resisted the challenge.

He was a professor of law at the University of New Mexico School of Law from 1972 to 1976.

== Judicial career ==
In June 1976, Governor Jerry Brown appointed Reynoso to the California Court of Appeal as an associate justice. He was the first Latino appointed to the Court. In 1981, Governor Brown elevated Reynoso to the California Supreme Court, succeeding the retiring Mathew O. Tobriner. George Deukmejian, then the attorney general and on the commission on judicial appointments, voted against Reynoso's confirmation.

In 1982, Reynoso was up for reconfirmation: under a measure adopted in 1934, California voters confirm a governor's appointments, and periodic unopposed elections are held for each justice during general elections, giving voters the opportunity to vote a justice out of office. Deukmejian, running as a Republican candidate for governor, urged voters to vote against justices Otto Kaus, Allen Broussard, and Reynoso; he hoped to replace them with conservative appointees, creating a new majority on the Court. The campaign labelled Kaus, Broussard, and Reynoso "Jerry's Judges". All three justices were retained; Reynoso received the lowest margin of victory, receiving the vote of only 52 percent of voters. A 1988 academic study of this election suggested that, although the retention election was theoretically nonpartisan and intended to retain justices based on their merit, partisan information (such as the affiliation of the governor who appointed the justice) is increasingly used by voters to structure their decisions in such elections.

Also during the 1980s, Reynoso was a member of the Congressional Select Commission on Immigrant and Refugee Policy. He was appointed by President Jimmy Carter.

As part of the court led by Chief Justice Rose Bird, Reynoso was a reliable part of the liberal majority. With that majority, he extended environmental protections, individual liberties, and civil rights.

When a case came before the Supreme Court regarding whether or not due process required that a non-English-speaking person charged with a crime be provided with an interpreter, Reynoso drew upon his experiences representing such clients to persuade a majority of his fellow justices that "basic fairness on the constitutional sense require that there be an interpreter for that individual".

In May 1985, Reynoso cautioned about the negative effects of politicizing judicial elections.

=== Removal from the Supreme Court ===
During the next retention vote in 1986, Bird, Joseph Grodin, and Reynoso were targeted by conservative and victims-rights groups. The 1986 campaign again portrayed the targeted justices as "soft on crime", but this time focused on the court's handling of the state's death penalty law. Reynoso believed Governor Deukmejian's decision to oppose him, Bird, and Grodin was the most important factor in that election. Deukmejian said that the justices' decisions on death-penalty cases demonstrated a "lack of impartiality and objectivity". Reynoso's advisors told him that it would take three campaign ads to counteract one ad by his opponents; he and the other justices lacked the funds to compete with the campaign, raising a collective $3 million to the opposition's $7 million. Deukmejian allegedly told Grodin and Reynoso that he would oppose their retention unless they voted to uphold more death sentences.

The campaign highlighted that the Bird court had overturned 59 consecutive death-penalty cases during Bird's nine-year tenure. Reynoso, who had voted to uphold the state's death-penalty law, voted only once for a death sentence during his seven years on the court. The Oxnard Press-Courier said in an editorial that Reynoso was Bird's "most consistent ally" and that "he has been second only to the chief justice in supporting decisions that favor criminal defendants over prosecutors". The California District Attorneys Association issued a 78-page report attacking the three justices, mainly over their death-penalty rulings, but dropped their campaign later because of fears a political campaign could affect the group's tax-exempt status.

"There's clearly an effort to politicize the court", Reynoso told United Press International during the campaign. He was endorsed by the California Organization of Police and Sheriffs. According to California attorney general John Van de Kamp, the court refused to hear appeals of, or affirmed, 97 percent of convictions in the 1984/85 fiscal year; Reynoso remarked, "That doesn't sound at all like a 'soft on crime' record". Defending his death-penalty votes, he said that "most, but not all" of the reversals stemmed from the 1978 Briggs Amendment, which "does not comport with U.S. Supreme Court law".

The campaign to remove the justices succeeded; voters rejected new terms for Bird, Grodin, and Reynoso. Reynoso was rejected by 60 percent of voters. This made Deukmejian the first governor in California history to have the opportunity to appoint three justices to the court at once. The justices left the bench when the court's term ended on January 5, 1987.

Afterward, Donald Heller, a former Federal prosecutor who drafted the 1978 death-penalty initiative approved by California voters, disagreed with the campaign to unseat the justices, calling Reynoso "a thoughtful, decent man who got thrown out" and "a very capable judge who tried to do the right thing in cases." Reynoso said of the result, "you can't blame [the voters] when the governor of the state, who is a lawyer, says the justices aren't following the law. If I didn't know better, I would have voted against me, too."

==== Impact of the removal campaign ====
The 1986 California Supreme Court retention election started a major trend turning such elections into "an ideological battleground over judicial philosophies and specific decisions", making them "as highly salient as races for overtly political offices", wrote one academic paper. Even before the election, California Supreme Court Justice Otto Kaus remarked "You cannot forget the fact that you have a crocodile in your bathtub", referring to the act of making a judicial decision without regard to the potential political consequences. "You know it's there, and you try not to think about it, but it's hard to think about much else while you're shaving." "You keep wondering whether you're letting yourself be influenced, and you do not know. You do not know yourself that well," he wrote. "You worry about it in two different ways," wrote Reynoso; "First you worry it might influence you improperly. Then you worry because you're concerned you might overcompensate, and not pay enough attention to arguments that are perfectly legitimate."

Erwin Chemerinsky, a law professor from the University of Southern California, agreed with the ousted Justice Grodin, saying "the legacy of 1986 could be that justices facing retention elections will decide cases with an eye, perhaps subconsciously, on how their rulings will affect their chances at the polls." Chemerinsky called for abolishing judicial-review elections. He wrote, "Largely due to defects in a poorly worded death penalty law, the court had a strikingly one-sided pattern of decisions on the issue", noting that this, Bird's controversial history, the trio's appointments by an unpopular governor, and the realization by their opponents that the court's ideology could be completely changed if the campaign succeeded led to the opposition campaign. Jazon Czarnezki, assistant professor of law at Marquette University, attributed Bird's defeat to "her resolute opposition to the death penalty and overturning a series of death sentences". Exit polls indicated that the death-penalty issue was the major reason why voters refused to retain the justices.

The justices were also impacted by a lack of support from Democratic legislative incumbents in safe districts.

Despite the fact that California Supreme Court justices undergoing a retention election are running uncontested, the median spending for justices' campaigns rose from $3,177 in 1976 to $70,000 in 1994.

Campaigns similar to the one expelling Bird, Grodin, and Reynoso have since been mounted against judges in other states, such as Justice Penny J. White of Tennessee, who also lost a retention election due to a death-penalty issue. Retired California Supreme Court Chief Justice Ronald George advocated eliminating retention elections and appointing justices to single 15-year terms, following an election in Iowa where three justices were removed from office after that state's high court overturned a ban on same-sex marriage. The campaign was largely funded by out-of-state organizations; George said that the January 2010 United States Supreme Court ruling allowing corporations and unions to contribute unlimited sums to independent political committees was likely to increase the influence of well-funded groups in nonpartisan judicial retention elections like those in Iowa and California.

== Post-judiciary ==
After leaving the Court, Reynoso returned to private law practice and academia. Shortly after his ouster, he was appointed to the California Post Secondary Education Commission.

He has worked for the New York–based firm of Kaye, Scholer, Fierman, Hays & Handler, out of their Sacramento office, where he was a special counsel. He worked on complex civil litigation, as an expert witness on legal ethics, and as a mediator. His agreement with the firm allowed him to spend up to 40 percent of his time on pro bono work.

In 1991, he joined the faculty of the UCLA School of Law, where he taught until 2001. He was a faculty adviser for the Chicano-Latino Law Review. In 1995, UCLA law students selected him as Professor of the Year.

The United States Senate appointed Reynoso to the U.S. Commission on Civil Rights in April 1993. He was appointed the vice-chairman of the commission by President Bill Clinton on November 19, 1993. During his tenure, he accused California Governor Pete Wilson of generating anti-immigrant sentiments to gain popularity. When the Commission harshly criticized Florida's handling of the presidential election of 2000, Reynoso said "the greatest sin" was the number of people who weren't allowed to vote. He was among the commissioners that looked into complaints that some eligible voters were denied the right to vote, or that votes were improperly counted, in Florida. Reynoso, along with Commission chairwoman Mary Frances Berry, resigned his commission on December 7, 2004, after President George W. Bush's White House staff announced that their six-year terms had expired on December 5 and announced replacements for them. Berry and Reynoso maintained that their commissions were not due to expire until midnight on January 21, 2005, but said in their resignation letters that it wasn't worth the fight. The move to replace them occurred after the Commission released a draft of a report criticizing Bush's civil rights record.

In July 2001, Reynoso joined the faculty at the University of California, Davis, School of Law as the first Boochever & Bird Chair for the Study and Teaching of Freedom and Equality. The chair, established with a gift from UC Davis alumnus Charles Bird, is named in honor of Judge Robert Boochever and Bird's parents, and is awarded in recognition of outstanding scholarship, teaching, and commitment to preserving and expanding the understanding of "the virtues necessary of a great republic." He retired in December 2006, becoming a professor emeritus.

In 2009, Reynoso spoke with UC Davis law students, noting that he has retired a few times, but was then chairing a citizens' commission investigating the death of Luis Gutierrez, a farm worker shot by police in Yolo County.

President-elect Barack Obama appointed Reynoso to his White House transition team in early 2009, as part of a justice and civil rights sub-team.

Following a screening of the Abby Ginzberg documentary film Cruz Reynoso: Sowing the Seeds of Justice in June 2010 in Washington, D.C., Reynoso was injured in a car accident in Virginia, along with his wife, Elaine, and grandson. Reynoso suffered a broken collarbone, a punctured lung, and other injuries when a Hummer struck their rental car at an intersection, hospitalizing him for nine days. His wife suffered "grave injuries" to her brain and internal organs, requiring multiple surgeries. Both were placed into medically induced comas; Elaine remained in a coma after the inducement was stopped. Reynoso was initially cited for pulling out into the path of the Hummer, which had the right of way, but a judge dismissed the case. Elaine Reynoso resigned from her position as a trustee of Sierra College in June 2011 to focus on recovering from her injuries; she has required extensive physical rehabilitation.

After the accident, Reynoso said he has re-evaluated his priorities, and will focus on completing his memoirs and legal articles, as well as resuming work on the Yolo citizens' commission probe. The commission's work was put on hold while the Reynosos recuperated.

Reynoso served on the boards of directors of the Mexican American Legal Defense and Education Fund, the Natural Resources Defense Council, and Children Now. He co-founded the Latino Issues Forum with Bob Gnaizda, and was chairman of its board of directors. He was a trustee of the Garment Workers Trust Fund.

Reynoso served as the chair of a task force that investigated the UC Davis pepper-spray incident of November 18, 2011. The Reynoso Task Force released its report (the "Reynoso Report") in March 2012, and it was made public in April 2012. It concluded that the incident "could and should have been prevented" and faulted police and university officials, determining that the "decision to use pepper spray [on demonstrators] was not supported by objective evidence and not authorized by policy."

Reynoso died on May 7, 2021, five days after his 90th birthday; the cause of death was unknown.

== Awards and honors ==
On August 9, 2000, President Clinton awarded Reynoso the Presidential Medal of Freedom, the United States's highest civilian honor. The medal's citation said "Through his efforts to address social inequity in his rural community, his leadership of the pioneering California Rural Legal Assistance program, his tenure as the first Latino on the California Supreme Court and his service on the U.S. Commission on Civil Rights, he has been a strong force for change and a passionate voice for our nation's disadvantaged".

Reynoso received the Hispanic Heritage Award in Education on September 7, 2000, during a nationally televised presentation at the Kennedy Center for the Performing Arts.

In 2003, UC Davis law students organized the La Raza Law Students Association; donors established the Cruz Reynoso Social Justice Fellowship. The fellowship helps Latino law students attending Berkeley Law afford the opportunity to work as judicial externs or in social justice during the summer break.

He was honored with the University of California Davis Medal of Honor at a lifetime achievement event on September 15, 2007, at the Mondavi Center. The medal is the highest honor bestowed by the university. At the event, UC Davis announced the Cruz and Jeannene Reynoso Scholarship for Legal Access, which helps first-year students with financial needs.

Documentary filmmaker Abby Ginzberg produced the film Cruz Reynoso: Sowing the Seeds of Justice. It was funded in 2009 in part by the California Documentary Project of the California Council for the Humanities. The film was screened at film festivals and other institutions in the United States, Cuba, and Uruguay. Ginzberg says she chose to make the film because "I was involved in the effort to save the justices in 1986, and I have always wanted to take a second look at why the campaign to recall them was so successful." It was first screened on March 16, 2010 at the Chicano Resource Center of the East Los Angeles Library. The film was a Gold Winner of the 2010 Davey Awards in the Film/Video/TV category. It also received the Jury Award for Best Feature Documentary at the Sacramento Film and Music Festival.

The City of Chicago passed a resolution honoring Reynoso that was presented to him while he was a visiting distinguished scholar at the John Marshall Law School in 2009.

The State Bar of California gave Reynoso its Bernard E. Witkin Medal in September 2009 for his "significant contributions to the quality of justice and legal scholarship" in California, recognizing him as a "legal giant".

In April 2011, the University of California, Merced awarded Reynoso the Alice and Clifford Spendlove Prize in Social Justice, Diplomacy and Tolerance. The prize honors people who exemplify the delivery of social justice, diplomacy, and tolerance in their work. The prize included a $10,000 award.

In May 2011, Chapman University conferred an honorary Doctor of Laws degree upon him.

== See also ==
- List of justices of the Supreme Court of California
- List of Hispanic and Latino American jurists

Legal offices
| Preceded by Mathew Tobriner | Associate Justice of the Supreme Court of California; 1982 – 1987 | Succeeded by Marcus Kaufman |
| Preceded by | Associate Justice of the California Court of Appeal, Third District; 1976 – 1982 | Succeeded by |
