= Linda Sánchez =

American lawyer & politician (born 1969)

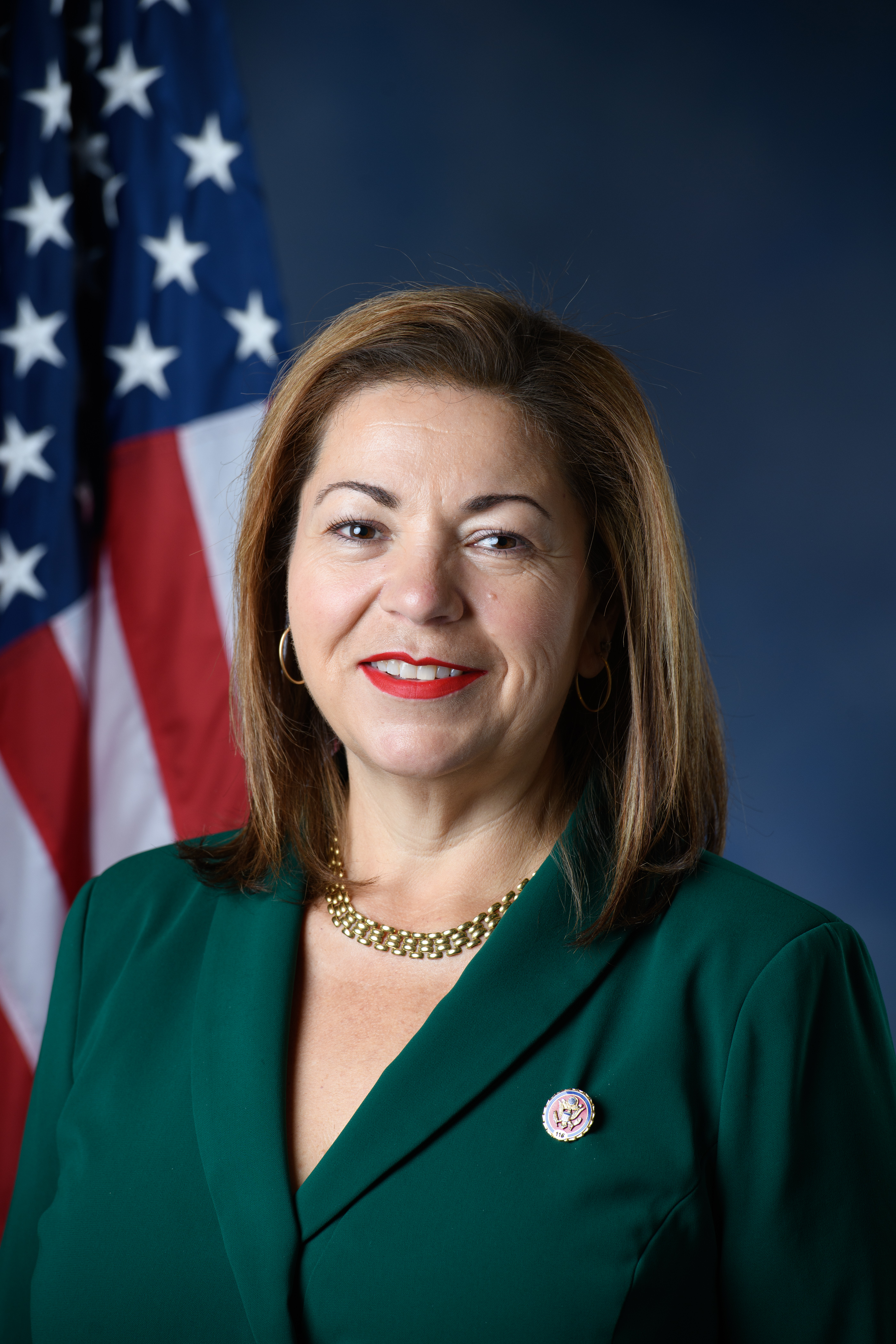
- Official portrait, 2019

Vice Chair of the House Democratic Caucus
- In office January 3, 2017 – January 3, 2019
- Leader: Nancy Pelosi
- Preceded by: Joe Crowley
- Succeeded by: Katherine Clark

Member of the U.S. House of Representatives from California
- Incumbent
- Assumed office January 3, 2003
- Preceded by: Steve Horn (redistricted)
- Constituency: 39th district (2003–2013); 38th district (2013–present)

Personal details
- Born: Linda Teresa Sánchez; January 28, 1969 (age 57) Orange, California, U.S.
- Party: Democratic
- Spouse: James Sullivan (m. 2009; div. 2021)
- Children: 1
- Relatives: Loretta Sánchez (sister)
- Education: University of California, Berkeley (BA); University of California, Los Angeles (JD)
- Website: House website Campaign website
- Sánchez's voice Sánchez on unemployment insurance. Recorded January 15, 2014

Linda Teresa Sánchez (born January 28, 1969) is an American politician and former labor lawyer serving as the U.S. representative for California's 38th congressional district since 2013. A member of the Democratic Party, she was first elected to Congress in 2002 in California's 39th congressional district. Sánchez serves on the Ways and Means Committee; she was the ranking member on the House Ethics Committee until 2017. In the 114th Congress, she chaired the Congressional Hispanic Caucus.

In 2016, Sánchez's colleagues elected her vice chair of the House Democratic Caucus for the 115th Congress, the fifth-ranking position in House Democratic leadership, thus becoming the first woman of color elected to a leadership position in the history of the U.S. Congress. She is the younger sister of former U.S. Representative Loretta Sanchez; to date, they are the only pair of sisters to have served in Congress.

== Early life, education and career ==
Sánchez was born on January 28, 1969, in Orange, California. She grew up with six siblings, raised by Mexican immigrant parents in Anaheim, where she attended Valencia High School. She earned her Bachelor of Arts in Spanish literature with an emphasis in bilingual education at the University of California, Berkeley, and her Juris Doctor degree in 1995 at the UCLA School of Law, where she was an editor of the Chicano-Latino Law Review.

Before her public service career, Sánchez was an attorney specializing in labor law. In 1998, she joined the International Brotherhood of Electrical Workers (IBEW) Local 441 and became a compliance officer. From 2000 to 2002, she was executive secretary and treasurer of the Orange County branch of the AFL-CIO.

== Political campaigns ==
=== 39th congressional district (2003–2013) ===
Sánchez started her political career in what was then the 39th district. That district had previously been the 38th, represented by five-term Republican Steve Horn. It already had a modest Democratic lean, but redistricting following the 2000 U.S. census made it even more Democratic, prompting Horn to retire.

Sánchez finished first in a six-person primary for the Democratic nomination in March 2002. She won the primaries with 33.5% of the vote; the second-place candidate, Hector de la Torre, received 29.3%. She went on to win the general election against Republican Tim Escobar, 54.9% to 40.8%. This made Sánchez the first woman IBEW member to be elected to Congress.

She ran unopposed in the Democratic primaries in 2004. She faced Escobar again in the general election, defeating him 60.7% to 39.3%. In the 2006 election, she defeated two primary challengers with 77.8% of the vote and attorney James L. Andion in the general election.

Linda and her sister Loretta became the first pair of sisters to serve together in the U.S. House of Representatives. Loretta represented an Orange County district from 1997 until 2017, after she announced her candidacy for the U.S. Senate. She finished second in California's "top two" primary, before she was defeated by fellow Democrat, then-California Attorney General Kamala Harris in the 2016 general election.

=== 38th congressional district (2013–2026) ===
After the 2010 U.S. census, Sánchez's district was renumbered the 38th district. In the upcoming election she faced Republican Ryan Downing.

=== 41st congressional district (2026–present) ===
Based on the 2025 California Prop 50, Sánchez filed to run for election in California's 41st congressional district.

Linda Sánchez, Democrat, is listed on the November 3, 2026 ballot running against Mitch Clemmons, Republican, for the 41st District. The new district will take effect after noon on January 3, 2027.

=== Electoral history ===
US House election, 2002: California District 39
Primary election
Party	Candidate	Votes	%
Democratic	Linda Sánchez	10,804	33.47%
Democratic	Hector De La Torre	9,450	29.27%
Democratic	Sally Havice	6,223	19.28%
Democratic	Helen Rahder	2,698	8.36%
Democratic	Ken Graham	1,879	5.82%
Democratic	Cecy Groom	1,230	3.81%
Total votes		32,284	100
General election
Democratic	Linda Sánchez	52,256	54.81%
Republican	Tim Escobar	38,925	40.82%
Libertarian	Richard Newhouse	4,165	4.37%
Total votes		95,346	100
Democratic gain from Republican			

US House election, 2004: California District 39
Party	Candidate	Votes	%
Democratic	Linda Sánchez (incumbent)	100,132	60.70%
Republican	Tim Escobar	64,832	39.30%
Total votes		164,964	100
Democratic hold			

US House election, 2006: California District 39
Primary election
Party	Candidate	Votes	%
Democratic	Linda Sánchez (incumbent)	23,893	77.79%
Democratic	Kenneth Graham	5,083	16.55%
Democratic	Frank Amador	1,738	5.66%
Total votes		30,714	100
General election
Democratic	Linda Sánchez (incumbent)	72,149	65.87%
Republican	James Andion	37,384	34.13%
Total votes		109,533	100
Democratic hold			

US House election, 2008: California District 39
Party	Candidate	Votes	%
Democratic	Linda Sánchez (incumbent)	125,289	69.67%
Republican	Diane Lenning	54,533	30.33%
Total votes		179,822	100
Democratic hold			

US House election, 2010: California District 39
Party	Candidate	Votes	%
Democratic	Linda Sánchez (incumbent)	81,590	63.27%
Republican	Larry Andre	42,037	32.60%
American Independent	John A. Smith	5,334	4.14%
Total votes		128,961	100
Democratic hold			

US House election, 2012: California District 38
Primary election
Party	Candidate	Votes	%
Democratic	Linda Sánchez (incumbent)	33,223	56.03%
Republican	Benjamin Campos	13,363	22.53%
Republican	Jorge Robles	12,713	21.44%
Total votes		59,299	100
General election
Democratic	Linda Sánchez (incumbent)	145,280	67.54%
Republican	Benjamin Campos	69,807	32.46%
Total votes		215,087	100
Democratic hold			

US House election, 2014: California District 38
Party	Candidate	Votes	%
Democratic	Linda Sánchez (incumbent)	58,192	59.09%
Republican	Benjamin Campos	40,288	40.91%
Total votes		98,480	100
Democratic hold			

US House election, 2016: California District 38
Primary election
Party	Candidate	Votes	%
Democratic	Linda Sánchez (incumbent)	86,396	70.02%
Republican	Ryan Downing	25,801	20.91%
Independent	Scott Michael Adams	11,189	9.07%
Total votes		123,386	100
General election
Democratic	Linda Sánchez (incumbent)	163,590	70.48%
Republican	Ryan Downing	68,524	29.52%
Total votes		232,114	100
Democratic hold			

US House election, 2018: California District 38
Party	Candidate	Votes	%
Democratic	Linda Sánchez (incumbent)	139,188	68.85%
Republican	Ryan Downing	62,968	31.15%
Total votes		202,156	100
Democratic hold			

US House election, 2020: California District 38
Party	Candidate	Votes	%
Democratic	Linda Sánchez (incumbent)	190,467	74.34%
Democratic	Michael Tolar	65,739	25.66%
Total votes		256,206	100
Democratic hold			

US House election, 2022: California District 38
Primary election
Party	Candidate	Votes	%
Democratic	Linda Sánchez (incumbent)	58,586	58.71%
Republican	Eric Ching	30,436	30.50%
Republican	John Sarega	10,768	10.79%
Total votes		99,790	100
General election
Democratic	Linda Sánchez (incumbent)	101,260	58.09%
Republican	Eric Ching	73,051	41.91%
Total votes		174,311	100
Democratic hold			

US House election, 2024: California District 38
Primary election
Party	Candidate	Votes	%
Democratic	Linda Sánchez (incumbent)	62,325	56.18%
Republican	Eric Ching	26,744	24.11%
Republican	John Sarega	13,841	12.48%
Republican	Robert Ochoa	8,034	7.24%
Total votes		110,944	100
General election
Democratic	Linda Sánchez (incumbent)	165,110	59.84%
Republican	Eric Ching	110,818	40.16%
Total votes		275,928	100
Democratic hold			

US House election, 2026: California District 41
Primary election
Party	Candidate	Votes	%
Democratic	Linda Sánchez (incumbent)	61,651	37.51%
Republican	Mitch Clemmons	58,785	35.77%
Democratic	Hector De La Torre	22,797	13.87%
Democratic	Shonique Williams	21,112	12.85%
Total votes		164,345	100

== U.S. House of Representatives ==
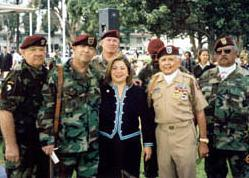
Congresswoman Sánchez participates in Long Beach's Veterans Day celebration.

=== Committee assignments ===
For the 119th Congress:

- Committee on Ways and Means
  - Subcommittee on Health
  - Subcommittee on Trade (Ranking Member)

=== Party leadership and caucus memberships ===
- House Democratic Party Steering and Policy Committee
- Co-founder of the Labor and Working Families Caucus
- International Conservation Caucus
- Congressional Arts Caucus
- Congressional Asian Pacific American Caucus
- Congressional Hispanic Caucus
- Congressional Wildlife Refuge Caucus
- United States Congressional International Conservation Caucus
- Congressional Progressive Caucus
- Congressional Coalition on Adoption
- Congressional Taiwan Caucus
- United States–China Working Group

Sánchez is a member of the Committee on Ethics and the United States House Committee on Ways and Means. In 2005, she was appointed Assistant Minority Whip. She is a member of the Congressional Hispanic Caucus and co-chairs the Congressional Labor and Working Families Caucus, which she co-founded. She is also a vice chair of the Congressional LGBT Equality Caucus.

== Political positions ==
Sanchez voted with President Joe Biden's stated position 100% of the time in the 117th Congress, according to a FiveThirtyEight analysis.

=== Abortion ===
Sánchez is pro-choice and has voted against repealing federal funding for abortions. She opposed legislation to bar transporting minors between states for abortions and making it a crime to harm a fetus in another crime. According to research by Project Vote Smart:

- Sánchez "supported the interests of the National Right to Life Committee 0 percent in 2010."
- On October 13, 2011, Sánchez "strongly opposed" the Protect Life Act (H.R. 358).
- Sánchez supported the interests of NARAL Pro-Choice America.
- Sánchez has voted against many anti-abortion bills, such as the Abortion Pain Bill, prohibiting federally funded abortion services, prohibiting taxpayer funding of abortion, and the Child Interstate Abortion Notification Act.

She opposed the overturning of Roe v. Wade.

=== Budget and economy ===
Sánchez voted against spending prioritizing in the event the debt limit is reached. In 2009, she supported a $192 billion anti-recession stimulus package, an $825 billion bailout fund, a $15 billion bailout for GM and Chrysler, and a $60 billion stimulus package. She voted in 2011 to raise the debt limit to $16.7 trillion. She opposes any move to privatize Social Security. As of 2014, she supported reducing defense spending to balance the budget.

=== Civil rights ===
Sánchez received a 100% rating from the NAACP, indicating a pro–affirmative action position. She supports gay rights and opposes discrimination based on sexual orientation or gender. On October 4, 2011, Sánchez made a statement on LGBT History Month, saying: "We must continue to strive to end discrimination in the workplace based on sexual orientation and fight so that all Americans have the right to marry and start families with those they love. I remain committed to supporting marriage equality, investments in HIV/AIDS care, treatment and research, and campaigns that take action against bullying in schools."

In a February 9, 2010, letter to President Barack Obama, then-Speaker of the House Nancy Pelosi, and Senator Charles Schumer, Sánchez wrote: "Currently, U.S. citizens and legal permanent residents may sponsor their spouses (and other immediate family members) for immigration purposes. But same-sex partners committed to spending their lives together are not recognized as 'families' under U.S. immigration law and thus do not have this same right. [...] This is unacceptable, and we believe comprehensive immigration reform legislation must include a strong family reunification component inclusive of LGBT families."

=== Drug policy ===
Sánchez supports drug reform and allowing people with drug-related convictions to receive student loans if they are deemed to be rehabilitated. She also seeks to expunge records of first-time drug offenders after probation.

=== Energy & oil ===
Sánchez opposes new exploration for oil drilling and would remove tax benefits for oil and gas exploration. She has also opposed permits and construction for new oil refineries. She supports tax credits and incentives for investments in renewable energy.

=== Environment ===
Sánchez opposes legislation that would bar the Environmental Protection Agency from regulating emissions. She supports higher emission standards and tradable allowances. She supports the cash-for-clunkers program and seeks to increase public transportation and trains through federally funded projects.

Sánchez supports the addition of several species to the IUCN Red List and promotes more extensive nature conservation.

=== Government reform ===
Sánchez supports lobbyist disclosures for campaign finances as well as requiring full disclosure of campaign finances. She seeks to guarantee free and fair elections.

After Hurricane Katrina in August 2005, President George W. Bush suspended the Davis-Bacon Act, a 1931 law that requires government contractors to pay prevailing wages. Sánchez was a very vocal critic of the suspension, and led the fight to reverse it. Bush reversed the suspension on October 26, 2005.

=== Gun control ===
Sánchez supports gun control and believes in background checks, no fly-no buy, and gun violence research. She seeks to close the gun show loophole for firearm sales. She believes gun manufacturers and sellers are accountable and ought to be liable for misuse cases by users.

=== Health care ===
Sánchez opposes the privatization of Medicare in any form, and opposes spending cuts to Medicare. She supports expanding healthcare coverage by a number of programs through federal funding. She has said that she believes health care is a basic right. She declined to vote for Representative John Conyers's universal health care bill HR 676, citing the need to support the Affordable Care Act.

=== Immigration ===
After the Arizona state legislature passed State Senate Bill 1070 and Arizona Governor Jan Brewer signed it into law, Sánchez claimed that the law, and similar laws throughout the country, were the product of white supremacists: "There's a concerted effort behind promoting these kinds of laws on a state-by-state basis by people who have ties to white supremacy groups. It's been documented. It's not mainstream politics." Representative Gary Miller called Sánchez's comments "an outrageous accusation." Steve Poizner also condemned them.

=== Technology ===
Twice in 2009, Sánchez introduced the "Megan Meier Cyberbullying Prevention Act," H.R. 1966, a bill that would criminalize the use of electronic communications if "the intent is to coerce, intimidate, harass, or cause substantial emotional distress to a person." The bill is a response to the suicide of Megan Meier, a 13-year-old girl whose 2006 suicide was attributed to cyberbullying on the social networking site MySpace. The bill has drawn criticism from members of the online community, legal scholars, and others who contend that it would infringe on the constitutional right to freedom of speech.

=== Tax reform ===
Sánchez supports a progressive tax system and voted against maintaining reduced tax rates for capital gains and dividends. She was rated a "Big Spender" by NTU, indicating she generally supports higher tax rates.

=== War ===
In 2014, Sánchez opposed combat operations in during the War in Afghanistan.

== Personal life ==
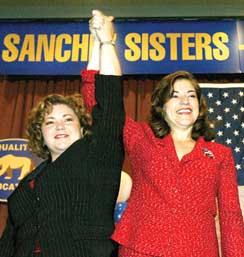
Linda and her sister Loretta Sanchez are the first pair of sisters to serve simultaneously in the United States Congress.

Sánchez married Jim Sullivan on April 13, 2009, in the district office of Congressman John B. Larson, who introduced the two about two years before the wedding. The marriage is Sánchez's second, and Sullivan has three sons from a previous marriage. On May 13, 2009, she became the eighth woman to give birth while serving in Congress.

Sánchez's father, Ignacio, died in 2018 after years of battling Alzheimer's disease. Sánchez has cited this experience as her motivation for finding a cure for the disease.

Sánchez is the younger sister of former Congresswoman Loretta Sanchez. They are the first and to date only sister pair to serve in Congress.

Sánchez delivered the Spanish version of the Democratic Radio Address on May 6, 2006.

== Works ==
- Linda Sánchez, Loretta Sánchez and Richard Buskin, Dream in Color: How the Sánchez Sisters Are Making History in Congress, Grand Central Publishing (September 2, 2008) ISBN 978-0-446-50804-9, foreword by Nancy Pelosi

In 2008, Loretta and Linda Sánchez published the joint memoir Dream in Color: How the Sánchez Sisters Are Making History in Congress. Publishers Weekly reviewed the book and wrote: "Linda and Loretta Sánchez present their compelling story—noteworthy not only for their history-making achievements (including first sisters or women of any relation to serve together in Congress, first woman and person of color to represent a district in Orange County, first Latina on the House Judiciary Committee and first Head Start child to be elected to Congress) but also for its 'American Dream' aspect—their parents immigrated from Mexico and despite lacking a formal education managed to send their seven children to college. Interweaving childhood vignettes with accounts of serving in Congress, both from California, this refreshing book evades many of the tropes of the typical political memoir—perhaps because these two women are not typical politicians."

== See also ==
- List of Hispanic and Latino Americans in the United States Congress
- Women in the United States House of Representatives

U.S. House of Representatives
Preceded by Ed Royce	Member of the U.S. House of Representatives from California's 39th congressional district 2003–2013	Succeeded by Ed Royce
Preceded by Grace Napolitano	Member of the U.S. House of Representatives from California's 38th congressional district 2013–present	Incumbent
Preceded by Zoe Lofgren	Ranking Member of the House Ethics Committee; 2013–2017	Succeeded by Ted Deutch
Preceded by Rubén Hinojosa	Chair of the Congressional Hispanic Caucus; 2015–2017	Succeeded by Michelle Lujan Grisham
Party political offices
Preceded by Joe Crowley	Vice Chair of the House Democratic Conference; 2017–2019	Succeeded by Katherine Clark
U.S. order of precedence (ceremonial)
Preceded by Mike Rogers	United States representatives by seniority 41st	Succeeded by Mike Turner
Preceded by Darrell Issa	Order of precedence of the United States	Succeeded by Tom Cole
