= Gerald P. Lopez =

Gerald P. López
- Born: 1948 (age 77–78)
- Occupation: Professor of Law
- Known for: Rebellious Lawyering

Gerald P. López (born 1948) is Professor of Law at UCLA School of Law. He is also the author of several influential books about lawyering and law practice.

== Education and early career ==
López obtained his B.A. degree in economics from the University of Southern California in 1970 and his J.D. degree from Harvard Law School in 1974.

He served as a judicial clerk for Edward J. Schwartz, then joined three other attorneys in founding a firm specializing in criminal defense, civil rights litigation and community mobilization. They used criminal defense, immigration law, and personal injury cases to pay the bills and subsidize their civil rights practice, where the odds of winning were less. It was around this same time that he began teaching, also to support his civil rights practice.

== Teaching career ==
He has taught at UCLA School of Law, Stanford Law School, New York University School of Law, and Harvard Law School.

At Stanford he co-founded the now defunct Lawyering for Social Change Program, at UCLA the Program in Public Interest Law and Policy, and the Center for Community Problem Solving at NYU.

Law students at Yale Law School have organized an annual public interest law conference called RebLaw, which was inspired by Lopez's book Rebellious Lawyering.

== Writing ==
He has published many books about lawyers as problem-solvers. In Rebellious Lawyering he sought to develop a new vision of the progressive practice of law. He is an advocate of client-centered lawyering, rather than the traditional approach to law practice which sees the lawyer as all-knowing and the client as powerless and needing help. The client-centered approach sees lawyers as working with clients, rather than on their behalf. He believes that a lawyer should be knowledgeable about the culture and experiences of the groups that lawyer works with, and is an advocate of integrating the fields of law and sociology and anthropology.

As a result of his approach, he advocates for comprehensive and coordinated legal and non-legal problem solving in low-income, of color, and immigrant communities.

=== Works ===
==== Books ====
- Rebellious Lawyering: One Chicano’s Vision of Progressive Law Practice (1992)
- Reentry Guide to New York City (2005)
- Streetwise About Money (2006)
- A Fair and Just Workplace (2006)

== Rebellious Lawyering Institute ==
Professor López is a co-founder of the Rebellious Lawyering Institute. The Rebellious Lawyering Institute has sponsored three law conferences in New Mexico, in 2008, 2010, and 2013, and a fourth law conference at UC Hastings College of Law, San Francisco, California in 2014.
