= Donald Wright =

American judge (1907-1985)

Donald Richard Wright
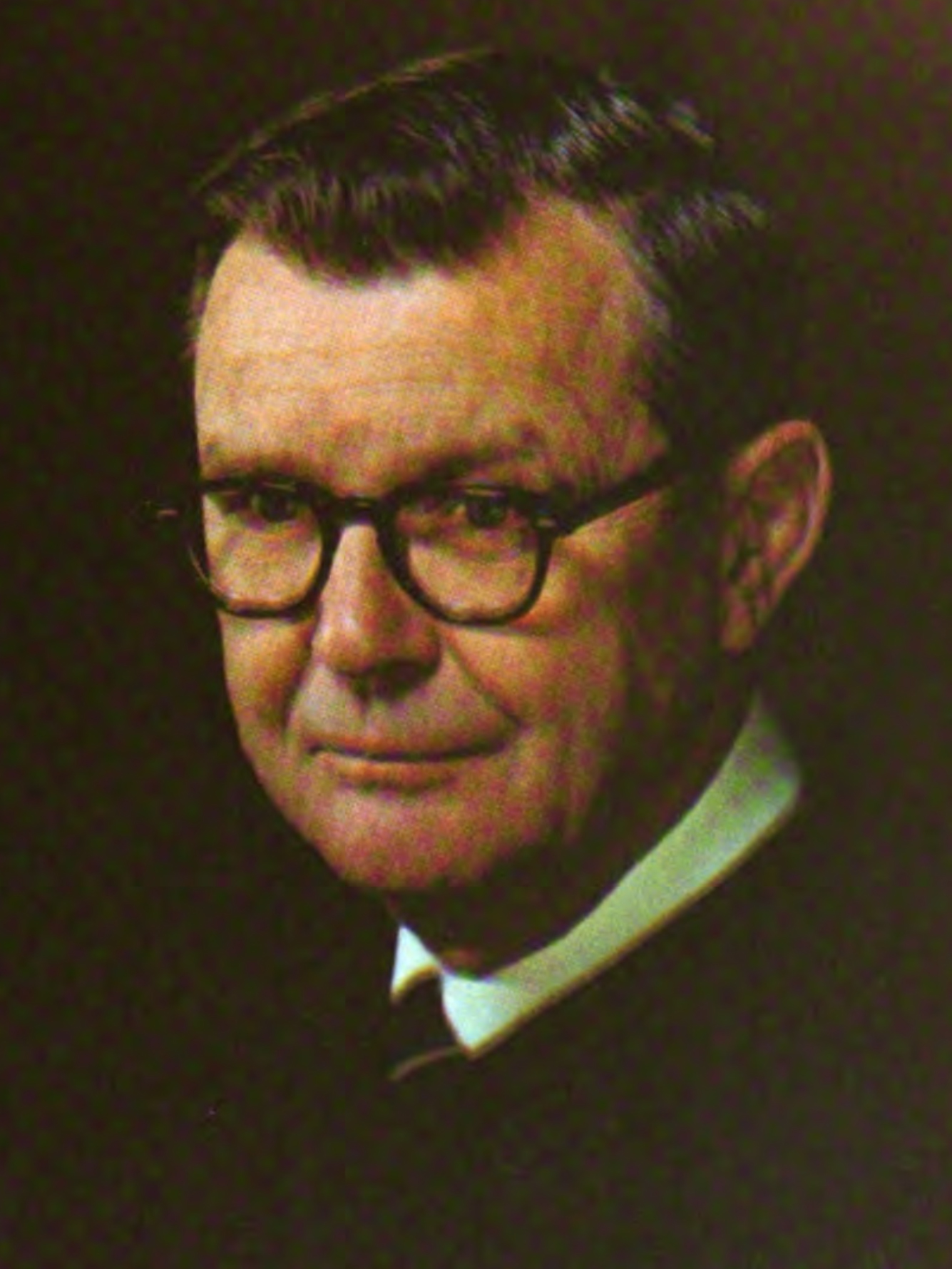
- Official portrait, 1971

24th Chief Justice of California
- In office April 17, 1970 – February 1, 1977
- Appointed by: Ronald Reagan
- Preceded by: Roger J. Traynor
- Succeeded by: Rose Bird

Associate Justice of the California Court of Appeal, Second District, Division Two
- In office December 23, 1968 – April 16, 1970
- Appointed by: Ronald Reagan
- Succeeded by: Lynn Compton

Personal details
- Born: January 23, 1907 Placentia, California, U.S.
- Died: March 21, 1985 (aged 78) Pasadena, California, U.S.
- Spouse: Margaret W. McClellan (m. 1932)
- Education: Stanford University (BA); Harvard University (LLB)

Donald Richard Wright (February 2, 1907 – March 21, 1985) was the 24th Chief Justice of California.

== Biography ==
Born in Placentia, California, Wright earned his Bachelor of Arts from Stanford University in 1929 and his Bachelor of Laws from Harvard Law School in 1932. Admitted to the California State Bar in 1933, he worked in private practice at the law firm of Barrick, Poole & Knox in Pasadena, California until 1953, except for 1942–1946 when he served as a Lieutenant Colonel in the U.S. Army Air Forces during World War II.

In 1953, Governor Earl Warren appointed Wright to the Los Angeles Municipal Court, where he served until 1961 when he was elected to the Los Angeles County Superior Court. In June 1968, Sirhan B. Sirhan appeared in court for arraignment on the charge of first-degree murder of Robert F. Kennedy, and Wright as presiding judge assigned a public defender to the case.

In 1968, Wright left the Superior Court when Governor Ronald Reagan appointed him as an associate justice of California Second District Court of Appeal, Division Two. In 1970, Reagan appointed Wright as the 24th Chief Justice of California, where he served from April 17, 1970, until his retirement on February 1, 1977. In the November 1970 judicial retention elections, Wright received 80.6% of the vote. When Wright stepped down, Governor Jerry Brown named Rose Bird as Wright's replacement.

Among Wright's most notable cases was People v. Anderson (1972), striking down the death penalty as cruel and unusual punishment, and in violation of the state constitution. In another opinion, Vesely v. Sager (1971), he crafted the doctrine of host liability for a provider of alcohol to someone who later injures another.

On March 21, 1985, Wright died in Pasadena, California.

== Honors and legacy ==
In 1971, the University of the Pacific conferred on him a LL.D. (honorary). In 1972, the California Trial Lawyers Association named Wright the Appellate Judge of the Year. In 1977, the Orange County Bar Association awarded him the Judge Franklin G. West Award. The Pasadena Bar Association annually awards the Donald R. Wright Distinguished Service Award for contributions to law and society.

His papers are held at the Huntington Library in San Marino, California.

== Personal life ==
In 1932, Wright married Margaret W. McLellan.

== See also ==
- List of justices of the Supreme Court of California

Legal offices
| Preceded by Roger J. Traynor | 24th Chief Justice of California; May 1, 1970 – February 1, 1977 | Succeeded by Rose Bird |
| New seat | Judge of the California Court of Appeal for the Second District, Division Two; December 23, 1968 – April 29, 1970 | Succeeded by Lynn Compton |
