= Chicanx-Latinx Law Review =

Law review on Chicanx and Latinx issues

- Discipline: American law
- Language: English

Publication details
- History: 1972–present
- Open access: Yes

Standard abbreviations
- Bluebook: Chicanx-Latinx L. Rev.
- ISO 4: Chicanx-Lat. Law Rev.

Indexing
- ISSN: 1061-8899 (print); 2169-7736 (web)
- LCCN: 92658558
- JSTOR: chiclatilawrevi
- OCLC no.: 60622211

Links
- Journal homepage

The Chicanx Latinx Law Review (CLLR; formerly Chicana/o-Latina/o Law Review, Chicano Law Review and Chicano-Latino Law Review) is a student-edited and produced law journal at the University of California, Los Angeles School of Law. Established in 1972, it is the first law journal in the United States to focus primarily on how law and policy affect the Chicana/o and Latina/o community within the America. The student publication includes scholarly work on an array of topics, such as affirmative action and education, Spanish and Mexican land grants, environmental justice, language rights, and immigration reform. It has been cited as an authority in courtrooms across the America.

== History ==
- Chicanx-Latinx Law Review (Vol. 36–onward)
- Chicana/o Latina/o Law Review (Vol. 27–35)
- Chicano-Latino Law Review (Vol. 11–26)
- Chicano Law Review (Vol. 1–10)

== Notable alumni and contributors ==
- Laura E. Gómez, one of the founders of critical race theory and a current professor at UCLA School of Law, serves as the journal's faculty advisor and is a frequent contributor to the journal's scholarship.
- Linda Sánchez, who graduated from UCLA Law School in 1995, was editor of the law review. She is the U.S. representative for California's 39th congressional district.
- Kevin R. Johnson is the dean and Mabie-Apallas Professor of Public Interest Law and Chicana/o Studies at UC Davis School of Law. Although not a graduate of UCLA Law School, he has contributed to the law review. His most recent article is "An Essay On the Nomination and Confirmation of the First Latina Justice of the U.S. Supreme Court: Sonia Sotomayor: The Assimilation Demand at Work".
- Gerald P. Lopez, a former law professor at the UCLA School of Law, has written articles for the law review. He is the founder of the Center for Community Problem Solving at New York University School of Law. He has also written four books and many articles on problem solving, race, immigration, health of undocumented Mexicans, and legal education.
- Daniel Olivas, an attorney with the California Department of Justice and a noted author of fiction, poetry, essays and book reviews, served as editor of the law review (1983-1984) during his last year at UCLA School of Law.
