= Rose Bird =

American judge (1936–1999)

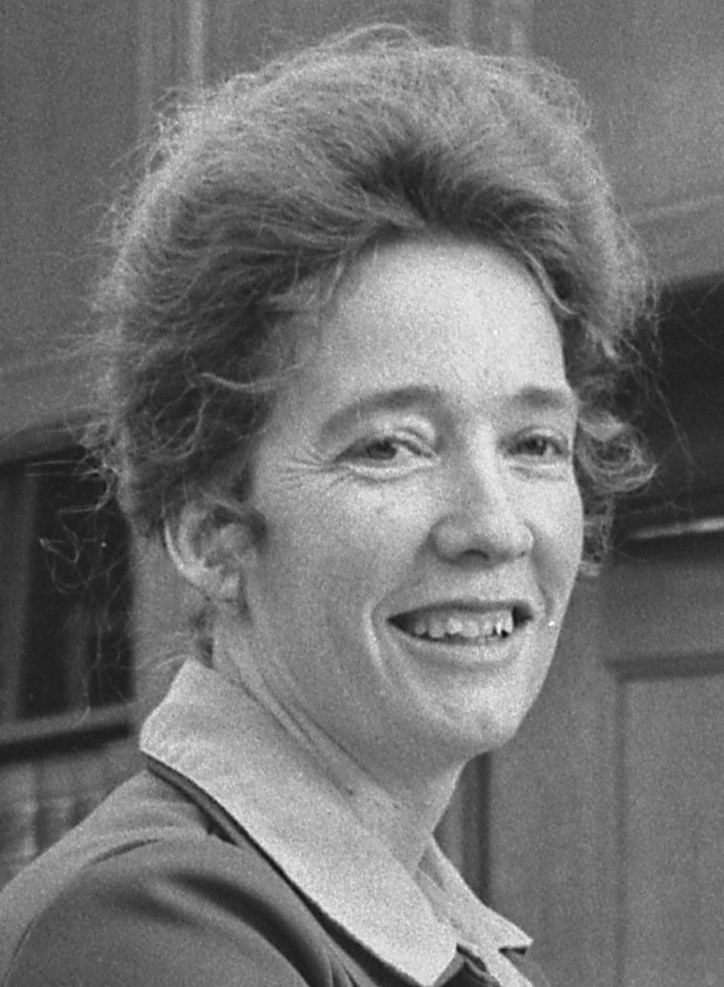
- Bird in 1977

25th Chief Justice of California
- In office March 26, 1977 – January 5, 1987
- Appointed by: Jerry Brown
- Preceded by: Donald R. Wright
- Succeeded by: Malcolm M. Lucas

Personal details
- Born: Rose Elizabeth Bird; November 2, 1936 near Tucson, Arizona, U.S.
- Died: December 4, 1999 (aged 63) Stanford, California, U.S.
- Party: Democratic
- Education: Long Island University (BA); University of California, Berkeley (JD)

Rose Elizabeth Bird (November 2, 1936 – December 4, 1999) was the 25th Chief Justice of the California Supreme Court. She was the first female law clerk of the Nevada Supreme Court, the first female deputy public defender in Santa Clara County, the first woman to serve in the California State Cabinet, and the first female Chief Justice of California.

She was also notable as the first, and to date only, Chief Justice in California history to lose a retention election.

== Early life and education ==
Bird was born near Tucson, Arizona, on November 2, 1936. Her father, Harry Bird, was the grandson of English immigrants and her mother, Anne (née Walsh), was Irish American. She had two older brothers. Her father deserted the family and died when she was five. Her mother moved the family to New York City, where Bird and her brothers grew up in poverty. She was a standout scholar in high school and won a scholarship to Long Island University, where she earned her bachelor's degree magna cum laude. She later graduated from the UC Berkeley School of Law (Boalt Hall) in 1965.

== Legal and political career ==
After graduating from the University of California, Berkeley School of Law, Bird became the first female law clerk in the Supreme Court of Nevada.

Between 1966 and 1974, she held the positions of deputy public defender, senior trial deputy, and chief of the appellate division at the Santa Clara County Public Defender's Office. She taught at Stanford Law School from 1972 to 1974. She volunteered with Jerry Brown's 1974 campaign for governor, and became a trusted advisor. After Brown won the election, he appointed Bird to the position of Secretary of Agriculture.

In February 1977, Governor Brown appointed Bird as Chief Justice of the California Supreme Court.

== Chief Justice of California ==
=== Tenure ===
Bird's tenure on the Supreme Court was controversial. She drew opposition due to her strongly liberal views, lack of judicial experience, and temperament. Bird was also controversial among the Associate Justices on her court. In a 1998 oral history interview, fellow liberal Stanley Mosk said that Bird was a bright and articulate lawyer, but a terrible administrator (one of the Chief Justice's major responsibilities). Mosk claims Bird required the Associate Justices to make appointments to talk to her for any reason.

=== Noted opinions ===
Bird's opposition to the death penalty was reflexive. She reviewed a total of 65 capital cases appealed to the court. In every instance, she issued a decision overturning the death penalty that had been imposed at trial, including that of serial killer Rodney Alcala. She was joined by at least three of the seven members of the court in 61 of those cases.

In 1981, Bird ruled that the State Constitution required that the state provide free abortions for poor women. In 1982, Bird argued in dissent that the proposed California Proposition 8, known as the Victims' Bill of Rights, should not be allowed on the ballot. In 1984, Bird and a majority of the court granted the American Federation of Labor's 1984 original petition to block a balanced budget amendment proposition from appearing on the ballot.

=== 1978 retention ===
Bird was first subject to a retention election in 1978. A campaign was waged against her, to which she did not respond. On election day, it was charged that the court decided to withhold the publication of a controversial ruling until after the 1978 vote. The ensuing controversy generated considerable press coverage but, by then, Bird had been retained by a 52% to 48% margin.

=== 1986 removal ===
In 1985, Bird said in interviews that opposition to her rulings was based on sexism, bigotry, and right-wing ideology led by U.S. Attorney General Edwin Meese. She said, "These are bully boys. Meese is trying it on the Supreme Court." Many Democrats later conceded that the remarks backfired on her and other members of the court appointed by Governor Brown. Her rulings and public statements led Bird's critics to claim that she was substituting her personal opinions and ideas for the law.

The anti-Bird campaign ran television commercials featuring the surviving families of murder victims, whose murderers' sentences Bird and her fellow Justices Cruz Reynoso, Joseph Grodin, and Allen Broussard had voted to reverse. In addition to Bird, Reynoso and Grodin were also voted off the seven-justice California state supreme court bench. Bird was removed in the November 4, 1986 election by a margin of 67% to 33%.

Justice Stanley Mosk, who often joined Bird, Reynoso, and Grodin, was not challenged. Twelve years later, Mosk explained why he was able to stay and Bird was not:

Rose Bird was pilloried because she generally voted to find some defect in death penalty convictions and to reverse them. I probably don't like the death penalty any more than she does. As a matter of fact, I think the death penalty is wrong, that a person has no right to kill, and the state has no right to kill. But the difference is that I took an oath to support the law as it is and not as I might prefer it to be, and therefore, I've written my share of opinions upholding capital judgments.

As a result of the 1986 election, Governor George Deukmejian elevated Malcolm M. Lucas to Chief Justice and appointed three new associate justices. The Lucas Court moved toward a more business-friendly and pro-law enforcement judicial philosophy.

After being removed from the court, Bird became something of a recluse. She cared for her aging mother in the Bay Area. In 1995, she volunteered to assist the East Palo Alto poverty law clinic and gave them her name after being inquired. They didn't recognize or remember her and assigned her to the copying machine.

== Death ==
Bird died on December 4, 1999, at Stanford University Medical Center from complications of breast cancer, which she had fought on and off since 1976. She was 63 years old.

== Legacy ==
Bird was the first and remains the only Chief Justice to be removed from that office by a majority of the state's voters. Prior to Bird, no California appellate judge had ever failed such a vote.

After her death, the California Public Defender's Association and California Women Lawyers Association established awards in her honor. New York Law School annually awards one graduating student the Chief Justice Rose E. Bird Award for Motivation in Pursuing Public Interest Law.

=== In popular culture ===
In 1984, Bird appeared as a family court judge in an episode of the television series Pryor's Place.

In 1987, Bird appeared as a judge on the scripted television program called Superior Court.

== See also ==
- List of justices of the Supreme Court of California
- List of female state supreme court justices
- List of first women lawyers and judges in California

Legal offices
Preceded by Donald R. Wright	Chief Justice of California; March 26, 1977 – January 5, 1987	Succeeded by Malcolm M. Lucas
