= 1982 California Proposition 8 =

Proposition 8
- June 8, 1982
- CRIMINAL JUSTICE

Results
Choice	Votes	%
Yes	2,826,081	56.42%
No	2,182,710	43.58%
County results
Yes
60–70%
50–60%
No
50–60%

Proposition 8 (or The Victims' Bill of Rights), a law enacted by California voters on 8 June 1982 by the initiative process, restricted the rights of convicts and those suspected of crimes and extended the rights of victims. To do so, it amended the California Constitution and ordinary statutes.

== Provisions ==
The Victims' Bill of Rights declared its purpose as to ensure that:

The rights of victims pervade the criminal justice system, encompassing not only the right to restitution from the wrongdoers for financial losses suffered as a result of criminal acts, but also the more basic expectation that persons who commit felonious acts causing injury to innocent victims will be appropriately detained in custody, tried by the courts, and sufficiently punished so that the public safety is protected and encouraged as a goal of highest importance.

=== Amendment of the constitution ===
The Victim's Bill of Rights added Section 28 to Article 1 of the constitution. This section has since been substantially added to and amended by Marsy's Law, enacted in 2008. Section 28 granted victims of crime the right to restitution from the perpetrator unless there were "compelling and extraordinary reasons" to the contrary. It also conferred a right to school safety; it reads "All students and staff of public primary, elementary, junior high and senior high schools have the inalienable right to attend campuses which are safe, secure and peaceful".

Section 28 introduced a "right to truth in evidence". This means that state courts cannot exclude any "relevant evidence" even if gathered in a manner that violates the rights of the accused. The U.S. Constitution takes priority over the California constitution so courts may still be obliged to exclude evidence under the federal Bill of Rights. In practice the law prevented the California courts from interpreting the state constitution so as to impose an exclusionary rule more strict than that required by the federal constitution. Exceptions may be made to the "truth in evidence" rule by a two-thirds vote of both houses of the California Legislature.

Section 28 provided that public safety should be the primary consideration in determining whether to grant bail. The Victims' Bill of Rights proposed to repeal Article 1, Section 12, which contained the existing constitutional provisions on bail, but this conflicted with another proposition enacted on the same day. The other proposition received a higher number of votes and so, under the California constitution, it took precedence. Section 28 finally provided that prior felony convictions "shall subsequently be used without limitation for purposes of impeachment or enhancement of sentence in any criminal proceeding".

=== Statutory changes ===
The Victims' Bill of Rights made various changes to the California Penal Code and the Welfare and Institutions Code. Victims of crime were granted the right to be notified of, to attend, and to state their views at sentencing and parole hearings. Other provisions related to the defense of insanity and diminished capacity, harsher punishments for recidivists and the limitation of plea bargaining.
