= List of Stanford University alumni =

Following is a list of some notable students and alumni of Stanford University.

== Academia ==
=== Presidents and chancellors ===
- Gene D. Block (A.B. 1970), 8th chancellor of University of California, Los Angeles
- Derek Bok (A.B. 1951), 25th president of Harvard University
- José Antonio Bowen (A.B., M.S., Ph.D. 1994), 11th president of Goucher College
- Avishay Braverman (Ph.D. 1976), 5th president of the Ben-Gurion University of the Negev
- John C. Bravman (B.S. 1979, M.S. 1981, Ph.D. 1985), 17th president of Bucknell University
- William R. Brody (M.D. 1970, Ph.D. 1972), 13th president of Johns Hopkins University
- Frederic Lister Burk (A.M. 1892), 1st president of San Francisco State University
- Menzies Campbell (LL.M. 1967), 37th chancellor of the University of St Andrews
- Nancy Cantor (Ph.D. 1978), 11th chancellor and president of Syracuse University
- Brian Casey (J.D. 1988), 19th president of DePauw University
- Joseph I. Castro (Ph.D. 1998), 8th chancellor of the California State University System, 9th president of the California State University, Fresno
- Jean-Lou Chameau (Ph.D. 1981), 8th president of California Institute of Technology
- Mung Chiang (B.S. 1999, M.S. 2000, Ph.D. 2003), 18th president of Northwestern University, 13th president of Purdue University
- France A. Córdova (A.B. 1969), 11th president of Purdue University
- Paul Davenport (A.B. 1969), 9th president of the University of Western Ontario
- Sean M. Decatur (Ph.D. 1995), 19th president of Kenyon College
- Rolando Ramos Dizon (Ph.D. 1978), 20th president of De La Salle University
- Michael V. Drake (A.B. 1974), 21st president of the University of California System, 15th president of the Ohio State University, 5th chancellor of University of California, Irvine
- Claudine Gay, 30th president of Harvard University, the second woman and first African-American to hold the position
- Vartan Gregorian (A.B. 1958; Ph.D. 1964), 16th president of Brown University, president of the Carnegie Corporation of New York, president of the New York Public Library, Presidential Medal of Freedom recipient
- William Westley Guth (A.B. 1892), president of University of the Pacific, 3rd president of Goucher College
- Jonathan Holloway (A.B. 1989), 21st president of Rutgers University
- Kristina Johnson (B.S. 1981, M.S. 1981, Ph.D. 1984), 16th president of Ohio State University, US undersecretary of energy
- Clark Kerr (A.M. 1933), 12th president of the University of California System, 1st chancellor of UC Berkeley
- Heather Knight (Ph.D. 1991), 21st president of Pacific Union College
- Amos Lapidot, president of Technion – Israel Institute of Technology
- William P. Leahy (Ph.D. 1986), 25th president of Boston College
- Lee Si-Chen (M.S. 1977, Ph.D. 1981), 10th president of National Taiwan University
- Jonathan Levin (A.B. 1994, A.S. 1994), 13th president of Stanford University
- Rick Levin (A.B. 1968), 22nd president of Yale University
- Richard P. Lifton (M.D. 1982, Ph.D. 1986), 11th president of Rockefeller University
- Charles L. Littel (M.A 1926), founder and 1st president of Junior College of Bergen County and Centralia Junior College
- Edna Ahgeak MacLean (Ph.D. 1995), 2nd president of Iḷisaġvik College
- Thomas L. Magnanti (M.S. 1969, M.S. 1972, Ph.D. 1972), founding president of Singapore University of Technology and Design
- Lynn Mahoney (A.B. 1986), 14th president of San Francisco State University
- Alan G. Merten (M.S. 1964), 5th president of George Mason University
- Bienvenido Nebres (M.S. 1967, Ph.D. 1970), 29th president of Ateneo de Manila University
- Vincent Price (A.M. 1985, Ph.D. 1987), 10th president of Duke University
- Edward John Ray (A.M. 1969, Ph.D. 1971), 13th president of Oregon State University
- L. Rafael Reif (Ph.D. 1979), 17th president of MIT
- Peter Salovey (A.B. 1980, A.M. 1980), 23rd president of Yale University
- Robert N. Shelton (B.S. 1970), 19th president of the University of Arizona
- Wallace Sterling (Ph.D. 1938), 5th president of Stanford University
- Su Guaning (M.S. 1983, Ph.D. 1984), 2nd president of Nanyang Technological University
- Donald Tresidder (A.B. 1919, M.D. 1927), 4th president of Stanford University
- Steven C. Wheelwright (M.B.A. 1969, Ph.D. 1970), 9th president of Brigham Young University–Hawaii
- Ray Lyman Wilbur (A.B. 1896, A.M. 1897), 3rd president of Stanford University, 31st U.S. secretary of the interior
- Jason Wingard (A.B. 1995), 12th president of Temple University
- Menahem Yaari (Ph.D. 1962), president of the Open University of Israel

=== Provosts ===
- Jeffrey Scott Vitter (Ph.D. in CS 1980), provost at the University of Kansas

=== Deans ===
- Oscar Brockett (A.M., Ph.D.), theater historian and dean of the College of Fine Art at the University of Texas in Austin
- Steven R. David (A.M. 1975), professor of international relations, associate dean of academic affairs at Johns Hopkins University
- Thomas L. Magnanti (M.S. 1969, M.S. 1972, Ph.D. 1972), former dean of the MIT School of Engineering
- Sherman Mellinkoff (B.S. 1941, M.D. 1944), second dean of the School of Medicine at the University of California, Los Angeles
- David Schaberg (B.A.), dean of humanities at UCLA, winner of the 2003 Joseph Levenson Book Prize
- Dale Schunk (Ph.D.), former dean of the School of Education, University of North Carolina at Greensboro
- Michael D. Smith (Ph.D. in EE 1993), dean of the Faculty of Arts and Science at Harvard University
- Mac Van Valkenburg (Ph.D. 1952 EE), former dean of engineering college, UIUC
- Peter Zemsky (Ph.D. 1995), dean of executive education and Eli Lilly chaired professor of strategy and innovation at INSEAD

=== Professors ===
- David A. Aaker, professor emeritus at the University of California, Berkeley's Haas School of Business,
- Ramesh K. Agarwal (Ph.D. in AA, 1975), William Palm Professor of Engineering at Washington University, computational fluid dynamicist
- Michelle Alexander (J.D. 1992), civil rights activist and professor of law at Ohio State University
- Barry C. Arnold (M.S., Ph.D.), professor of statistics at the University of California, Riverside
- Silvia Arrom (Ph.D. 1978), historian and professor emerita of Latin American Studies at Brandeis University
- Susan Athey (Ph.D. in business school), winner of the John Bates Clark Medal (2007) in Economics of Technology, professor in the School of Humanities and Sciences at the Stanford Graduate School of Business
- Lawrence J. Baack (Ph.D. 1973), historian specializing in modern European history; former vice chairperson of the History Department at University of Nebraska–Lincoln; visiting scholar at the University of California, Berkeley
- Roger Boesche (B.A., Ph.D.), professor of the history of ideas at Occidental College
- Edward Boyden (Ph.D.), MIT professor in Neurotechnology, faculty member in the MIT Media Lab, and coinventor of optogenetics
- Ronald N. Bracewell AO (Ph.D. 1949), professor of electrical engineering, pioneer of radio astronomy, designed and operated the spectroheliograph used to map the temperature of the Sun during the NASA Moon landing
- Hal Brands (B.A. 2005), professor of global affairs at Johns Hopkins University
- David L. Brody, professor in Neurology at Washington University
- Yolanda Broyles-Gonzalez (Ph.D. 1981), professor and chair of American ethnic studies at Kansas State University
- Emmanuel Candès (Ph.D. 1998), professor in statistics at Stanford and the Alan T. Waterman Award winner
- Ebony Carter (B.A. 2000), professor of obstetrics and gynecology and NIH R21 Award recipient
- Albert Edward Caswell (A.B. 1908, Ph.D. 1911), physicist and chair of University of Oregon Department of Physics 1914–1949
- KJ Cerankowski (Ph.D. 2014), assistant professor at Oberlin College and co-founder of the field of asexuality studies
- Victoria Chang (M.B.A, 1998), professor of poetry and literature, Bourne Chair in Poetry at Georgia Tech, director of Poetry@Tech
- Alexandra Chasin (Ph.D. 1993), writer and Mellon Chair in Humanities, Bard Prison Initiative
- Mung Chiang (B.S. 1999, M.S. 2000, Ph.D. 2003), professor of electrical engineering at Princeton University; 2013 Alan T. Waterman Award recipient
- Marjorie Cohn (A.B. 1970), professor of law at the Thomas Jefferson School of Law
- Steven D'Hondt (B.S. 1984), professor of oceanography at the University of Rhode Island
- Cara Drinan (J.D. 2002), author and professor of law at Catholic University
- Miquel Faig (Ph.D. 1986), professor of economics at the University of Toronto Mississauga
- Edward McNeil Farmer (A.B. 1923, A.M. 1926), professor in the Graphic Arts Department at Stanford University 1923–1964
- J. Doyne Farmer (B.S. physics 1973), professor of mathematics at Oxford University and co-founder of the Prediction Company
- George E. Frakes (A.B. 1954), professor emeritus of history and geography at Santa Barbara City College
- H. Bruce Franklin (Ph.D. 1961), professor of English and American studies at Rutgers University
- Melissa Franklin (Ph.D. 1982), professor of physics at Harvard University who contributed to the discovery of the top quark
- James Paul Gee (A.M. 1974, Ph.D. 1975), linguist, literacy researcher, and professor of literacy studies at Arizona State University
- Larry Gladney (Ph.D. 1985), professor of physics at Yale University
- Edray H. Goins (Ph.D. math 1999), professor and president of the National Association of Mathematicians
- Daniel Harrison (A.B. 1981), chairman of the Department of Music at Yale University
- John Harsanyi (Ph.D. 1959), 1972 Nobel Prize winner in economics and professor at the University of California, Berkeley
- Dale R. Herspring (B.A. 1965), professor of political science at Kansas State University
- Bengt R. Holmström (M.S. operations research, Ph.D. business), economist at MIT and Nobel Prize winner in economics (2016)
- bell hooks (A.B. 1973), Distinguished Professor in Residence at Berea College and writer on race, class, and gender
- Mary-Louise Hooper (A.B. 1955), civil rights activist and journalist
- Russell Jeung (B.A., M.A), professor of Asian American studies at San Francisco State University, co-founder of Stop AAPI Hate
- Grace Y. Kao (B.A., M.A.), professor of ethics at Claremont School of Theology
- David Kreps (Ph.D.), game theorist, economist, and professor at the Graduate School of Business at Stanford University
- David B. Kronenfeld (M.A. 1965, Ph.D. 1969), professor of anthropology at the University of California, Riverside
- David Lang (B.A.), professor of composition at the Yale School of Music
- Mark Lemley (A.B. 1988), professor at Stanford Law School, expert in patent law
- Lisa Lowe (A.B. 1977), professor of American Studies at Yale University
- Jitendra Malik (Ph.D. 1985), computer science professor at UC Berkeley
- Virginia Matzek (Ph.D.), associate professor in environmental studies and sciences at Santa Clara University
- H. Brett Melendy (A.B. 1946, A.M. 1948, Ph.D. 1952), historian and administrator at San Jose State University and University of Hawaiʻi
- Paul Milgrom (M.S. statistics, Ph.D. business), professor in economics at Stanford, Nobel Prize winner in economics (2020)
- Tom M. Mitchell (Ph.D. computer science), professor and head of the machine learning department at Carnegie Mellon University
- Ricardo Felipe Munoz (B.A. 1972), Distinguished Professor of Clinical Psychology at Palo Alto University
- Nils Nilsson (Ph.D. 1958 computer science), led the effort in developing Shakey the robot at SRI, professor of engineering, emeritus in computer science at Stanford University
- Charles Ogletree (A.B. 1975, A.M. 1975), professor at Harvard Law School and founder of the Charles Hamilton Houston Institute for Race and justice
- Stephen Quake (M.S. 1991), professor of bioengineering and applied physics at Stanford, Lemelson–MIT Prize recipient, and co-founder of Helicos Biosciences
- Joachim Remak (Ph.D. 1955), professor of history at the University of California, Santa Barbara
- Bruce Reznick (Ph.D. 1976), mathematician at the University of Illinois at Urbana–Champaign, noted for number theory
- Natalie Roe (Ph.D. 1989), director of the Physics Division at Lawrence Berkeley National Laboratory
- Alvin E. Roth (Ph.D. operations research), professor of economics at Stanford University and Harvard University, 2012 Nobel prize winner in economics
- John C. Rule (A.B., M.A., 1952), historian of 17th and 18th-century France at the Ohio State University
- Stuart Russell (Ph.D. 1986 computer science), chair of computer science at UC-Berkeley, winner of IJCAI Computers and Thought Award
- John Kenneth Salisbury, Jr. (Ph.D.), roboticist and professor emeritus at Stanford's Computer Science Department and Stanford School of Medicine's Department of Surgery
- Mavis Sanders (A.M. 1992, Ph.D. 1995), research scholar
- Gita Sen (Ph.D.), feminist economist, adjunct professor at Harvard University, and professor emeritus at Indian Institute of Management Bangalore
- Gregory Shaver, mechanical engineer, academic
- Frank Shuffelton, literary scholar and who taught at the University of Rochester
- Victoria Stodden (Ph.D., J.D.), associate professor of information sciences at University of Illinois Urbana-Champaign
- Nicholas B. Suntzeff (B.S. Mathematics 1974), Gruber Prize in Cosmology 2007, Breakthrough Prize in Fundamental Physics (2015), University Distinguished Professor
- Robert E. Swain (B.S. 1899), head of Stanford's Department of Chemistry, a founder of the Stanford Research Institute
- Bette Talvacchia (Ph.D. 1981), professor of art history emeritus at the University of Connecticut
- Carole Terry (D.M.A. 1977), professor of organ and harpsichord emerita at the University of Washington
- Fred W. Turek, director of the Center for Sleep and Circadian Biology and professor in the Department of Neurobiology at Northwestern University
- Michael S. Turner (Ph.D. 1978), cosmologist and professor of physics at the University of Chicago
- Mark von Hagen (A.M. 1981, Ph.D. 1985), director of the School of Historical, Philosophical and Religious Studies at Arizona State University
- William "Bill" Warren (physicist), (B.S., 1960), professor emeritus at Oregon State University
- Edith Brown Weiss (B.A.), professor of law at Georgetown University
- Joel Westheimer, professor of citizenship education at the University of Ottawa
- Oliver Williamson (MBA, 1960), Nobel Prize in economics (2009), professor at the University of California, Berkeley
- Richard D. Wolff (A.M. 1964), Marxist economist and professor of economics emeritus at the University of Massachusetts Amherst
- Shing-Tung Yau, former faculty member at Harvard University and Fields Medal recipient
- David B. Yoffie, professor of international business administration at Harvard Business School
- Kevin Zhu (Ph.D.), professor at the Rady School of Management, University of California, San Diego

=== Other scholarship and education ===
- William Gorham (A.B. 1952), economist and president of the Urban Institute 1968–2000
- Leslie P. Hume (A.M. 1971, Ph.D. 1979), historian and philanthropist
- Charles V. Park (A.B. 1909), director of the Central Michigan University Libraries
- Fred Swaniker (MBA 2004), founder of the pre-university African Leadership Academy and African Leadership University

== Advocacy and nonprofits ==
- Antonio Buehler (M.B.A. 2006), civil-rights leader battling police corruption
- William George Carr, executive secretary of the National Education Association 1952–1967
- Jan Crull Jr. (enrollee, summer quarter 1967), Native American Rights activist and iconoclastic filmmaker, first proposed the need for an Indian college fund as an aide to U.S. Congressman Paul Simon
- Peter Dalglish, international children's rights advocate; founded Toronto-based Street Kids International (SKI)
- Ann B. Friedman, founder of Planet Word, a museum of language arts in Washington, D.C.
- David Harris (non-degreed), leader in the movement against the Vietnam War
- Harry Hay (1934, non-degreed), founder of the gay liberation movement
- Denis Hayes (A.B. 1969, J.D. 1985), environmental activist and coordinator of the first Earth Day
- Carol F. Henry, co-founder and president of the Los Angeles Opera
- Mary-Louise Hooper (A.B. 1955), civil rights activist and journalist
- Sophia Kianni, climate activist, UN advisor
- Paul Rogat Loeb (non-degreed), social and political activist
- Maura McNiel, supporter of feminism and women's rights
- Rebekah Mercer (B.S., M.S. 1999), director of Mercer Family Foundation and conservative activist and donor
- Gregory Minor (M.S. 1966), resigned from the General Electric nuclear reactor division in 1976 to protest the use of nuclear power, galvanizing anti-nuclear groups across the U.S.
- Aya Mouallem (MS/Ph.D, Knight-Hennessy Scholar), co-founder, co-director, and current board advisory member of All Girls Code
- Michael Murphy, co-founder of Esalen Institute
- Dick Price, co-founder of Esalen Institute
- Marc Rotenberg (J.D. 1987), president and executive director of the Electronic Privacy Information Center
- James Rucker (B.S., 1991), co-founder of Color of Change
- Eunice Kennedy Shriver, founder of Special Olympics, sister of President John F. Kennedy
- Piya Sorcar, founder and CEO of TeachAids
- John Zerzan, green anarchist philosopher

== Art and architecture ==
- Marguerite Blasingame, painter and sculptor
- Barbara Bloemink, art historian and former director and chief curator of five art and design museums
- Howell Chambers Brown (A.B. 1904), printmaker
- Catherine Chalmers (B.S. 1979), artist and photographer
- Jorge Cham (Ph.D. 2003), cartoonist of the webcomic Piled Higher and Deeper
- Robbie Conal (M.F.A.), artist
- Margo Davis, photographer
- Richard Diebenkorn, painter
- Laura Farabough (A.B.D. drama), performance artist
- Paulette Frankl, courtroom artist and biographer
- Serena Ho, painter
- Brad Howe, sculptor
- Beth Katleman, sculptor
- Amy Kurzweil (B.A. 2009), cartoonist and graphic novelist
- Harold Levitt, architect
- Brenda Louie (M.F.A 1993), artist known for large, painterly abstractions and multimedia installations
- Sanaz Mazinani (M.F.A. 2011), multidisciplinary artist
- Robert Motherwell, painter
- Joan Myers (1967), award-winning fine art photographer
- Chris Onstad, author and illustrator of the webcomic Achewood
- Kamau Amu Patton (M.F.A. 2007), multidisciplinary artist
- Kameelah Janan Rasheed, artist, educator, and writer
- Shirley Russell, painter and educator
- Komal Shah, influential art collector
- Catherine Eaton Skinner, multimedia artist
- Sherri Smith (B.A. 1965), fiber artist and professor
- Jacqueline Thurston (MA 1962), visual artist and writer
- Jim Toomey, syndicated cartoonist

== Business ==
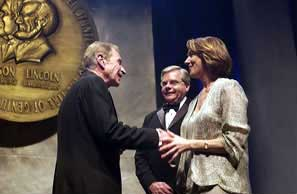
Ray Dolby

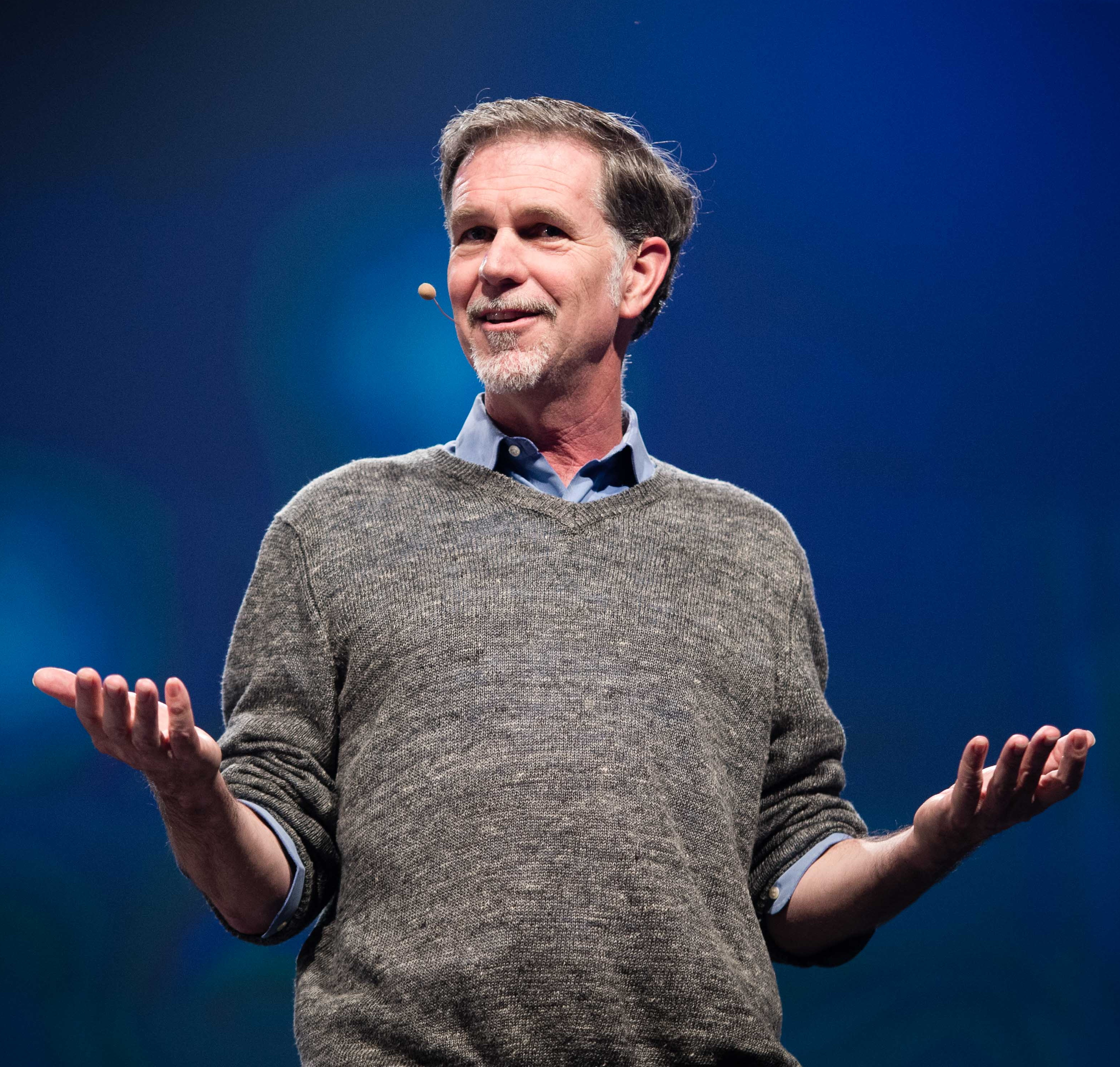
Reed Hastings

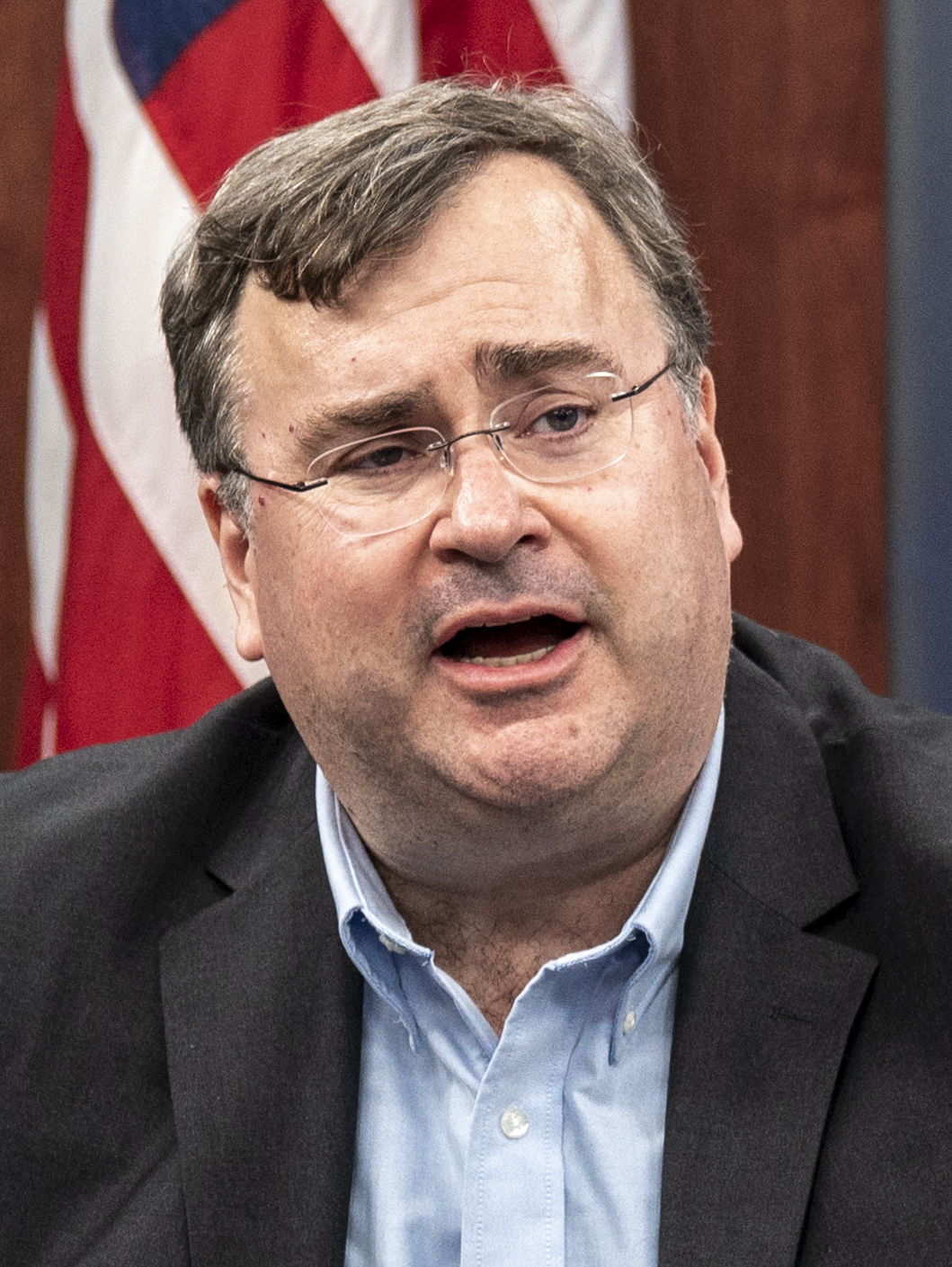
Reid Hoffman

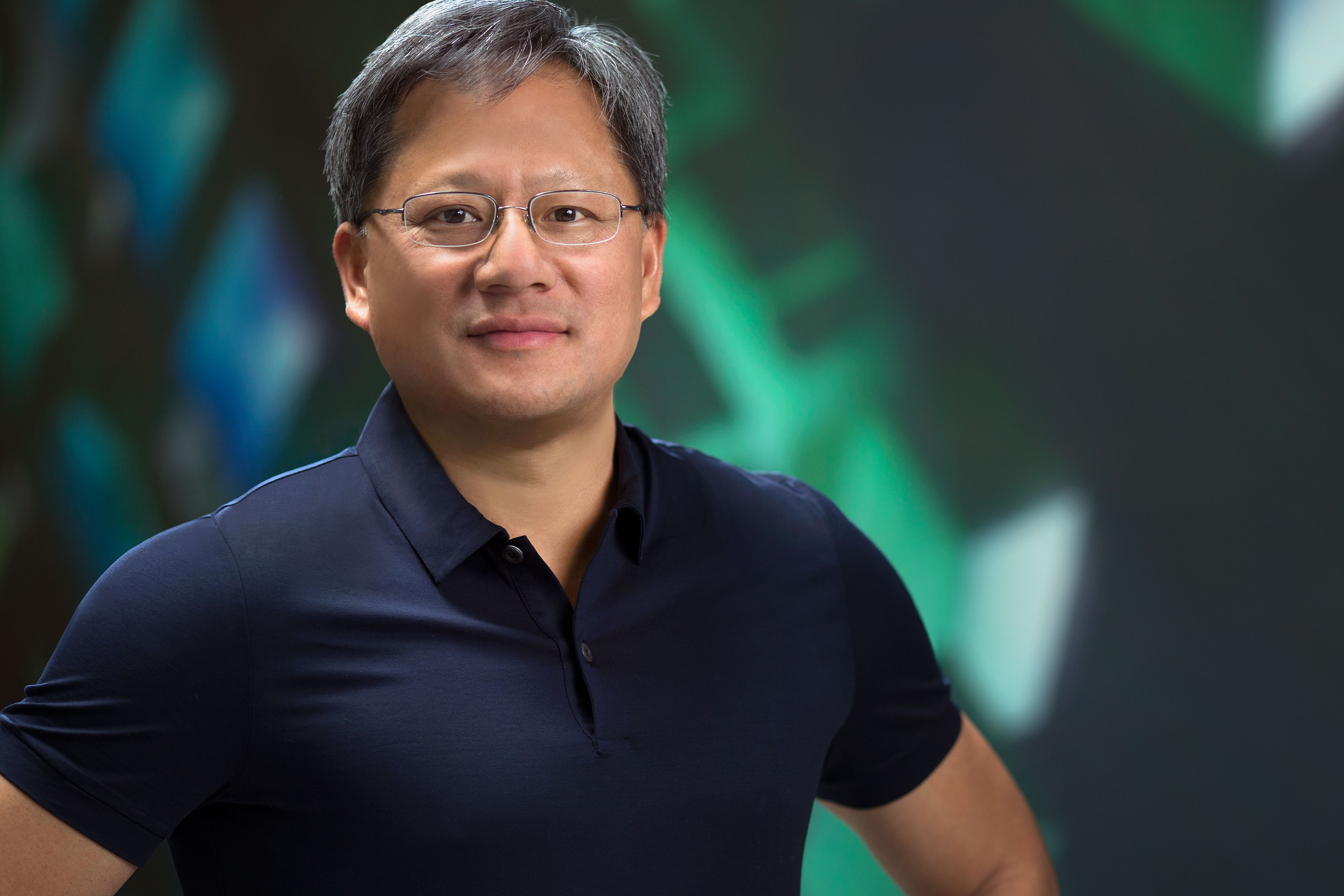
Jensen Huang

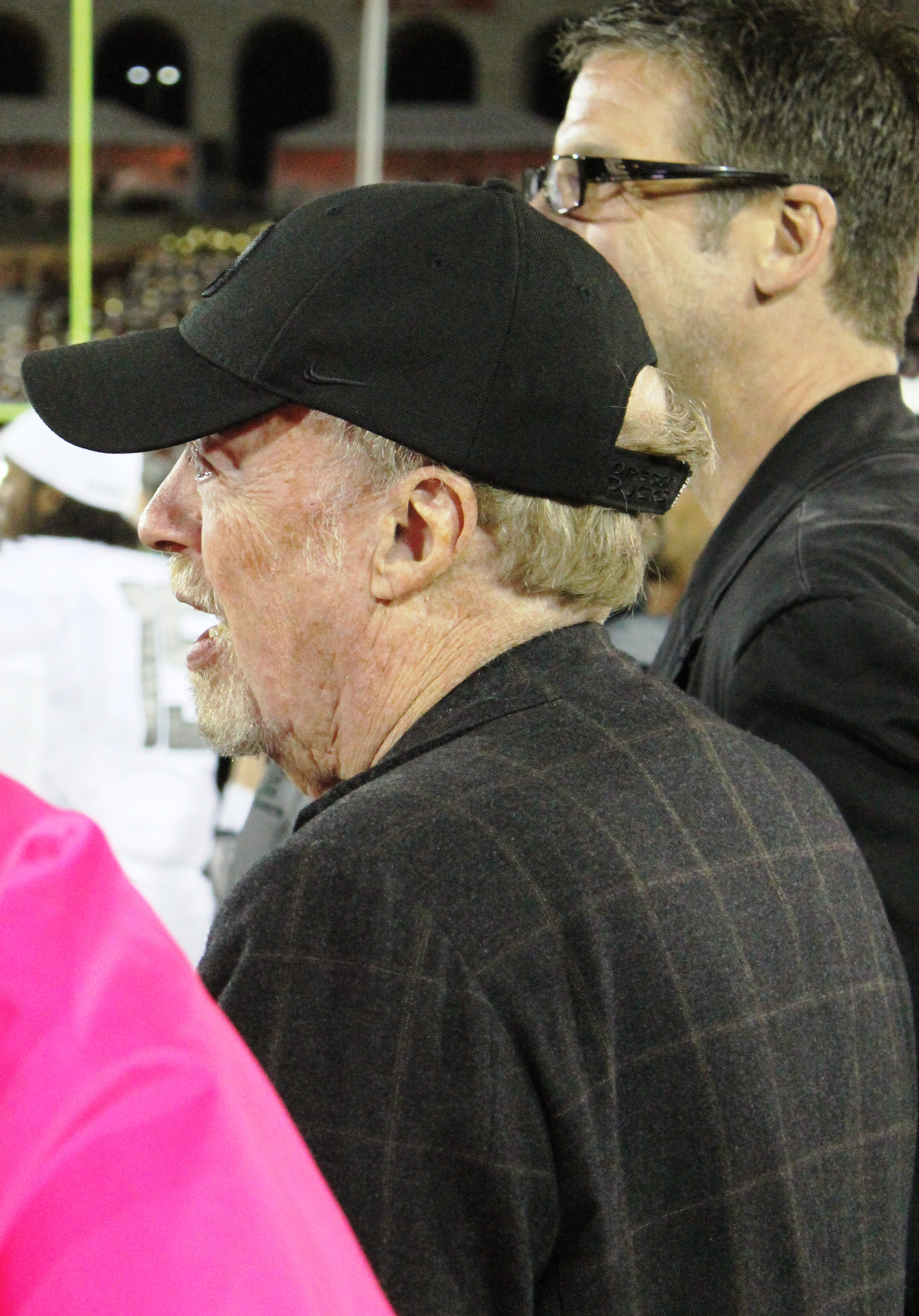
Phil Knight

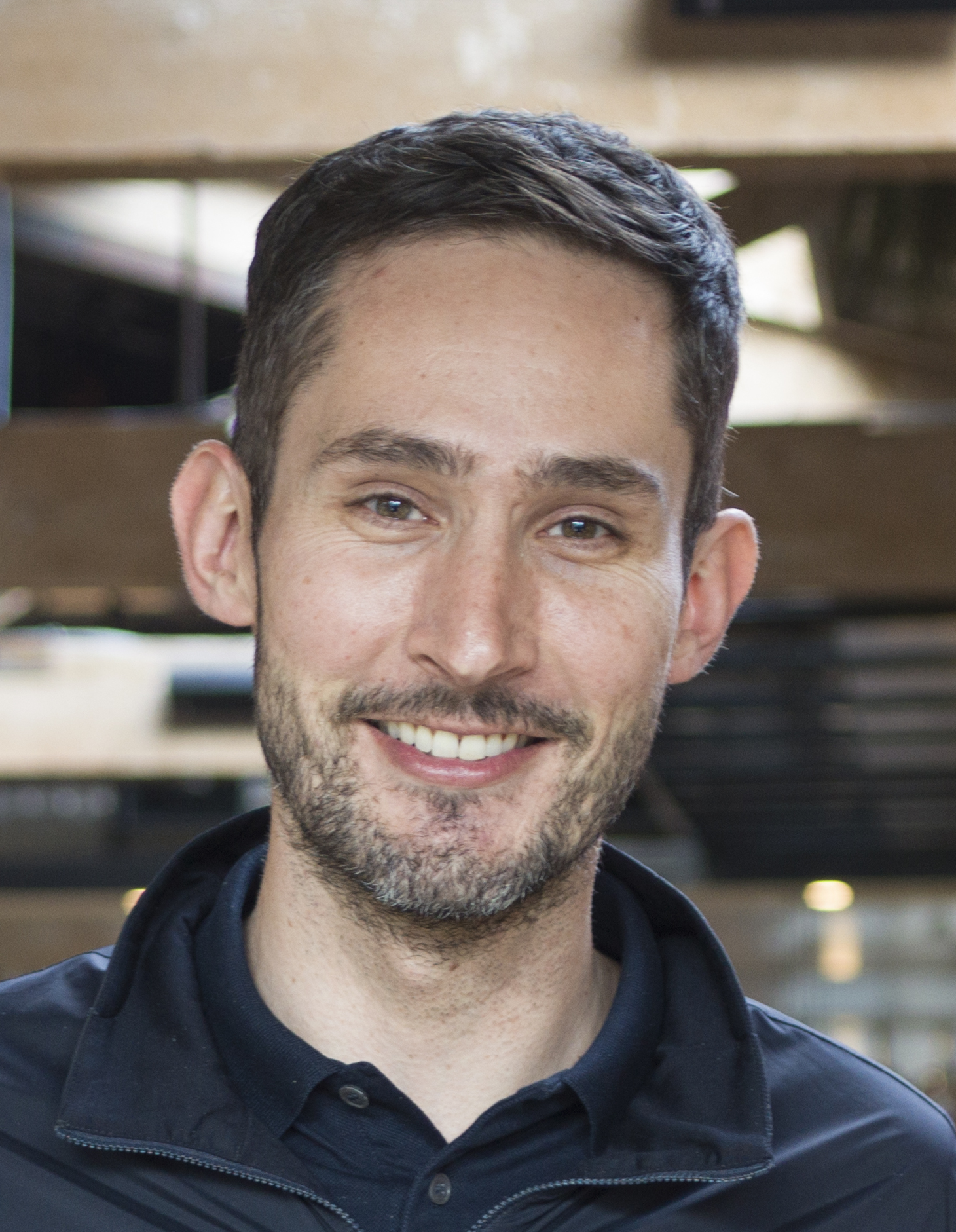
Kevin Systrom

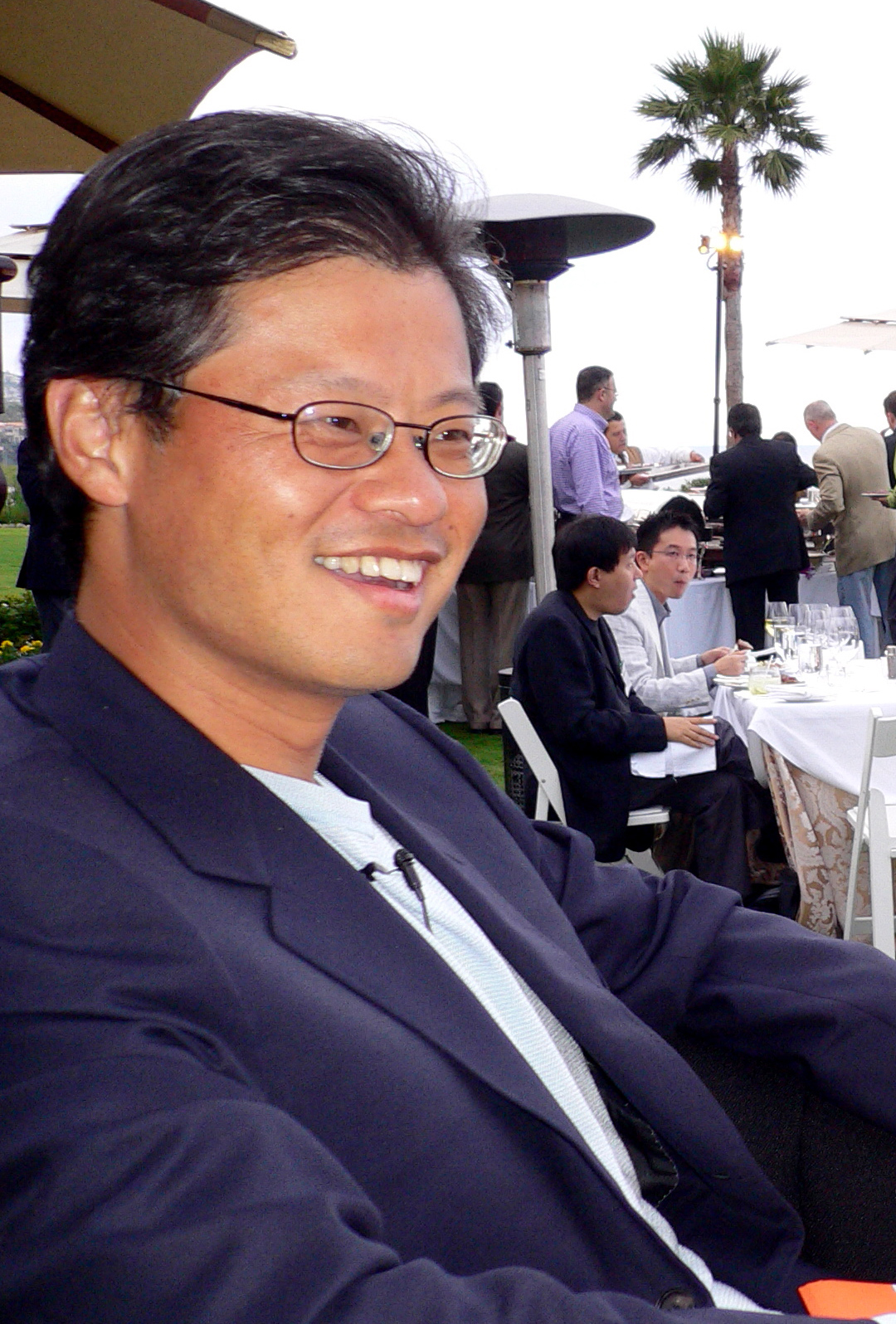
Jerry Yang

=== Company founders ===
- Brian Acton (B.S. 1994), co-founder of WhatsApp
- Toyin Ajayi (B.S), CEO and co-founder of Cityblock Health
- Kurt Akeley (M.S. 1982, Ph.D. 2004), co-founder of Silicon Graphics
- Sam Altman, co-founder of OpenAI
- Michael Arrington (J.D., 1995), founder of TechCrunch
- Dario Amodei (B.S., 2006), co-founder of Anthropic
- Diosdado Banatao (M.S.), venture capitalist; S3 Graphics, Chips and Technologies, and Mostron co-founder
- David Baszucki (G.M., 1985), co-founder and CEO of Roblox
- Andy Bechtolsheim (Ph.D. CS/EE 1977–1982 – non-degreed), co-founder of Sun Microsystems
- Aneel Bhusri, co-founder of Workday
- Len Bosack (M.S. 1981), co-founder of Cisco Systems
- Sergey Brin (M.S.), Google co-founder
- Orkut Büyükkökten, founder of social networking service Orkut
- Tim Cadogan, CEO of GoFundMe, co-founder and former CEO of OpenX
- Rachel Romer Carlson, founder and CEO of Guild Education
- Morris Chang (Ph.D. electrical engineering), founder, chairman and CEO of Taiwan Semiconductor Manufacturing Company, 2010 winner of IEEE Medal of Honor
- Tim Chen, co-founder and CEO of NerdWallet
- Joe Coulombe, founder of Trader Joe's
- James Coulter, co-founder of TPG Capital
- Ray Dolby, audio engineer and founder of Dolby Labs
- Tim Draper, venture capital investor
- Helmy Eltoukhy (B.S., M.S., Ph.D.), co-founder and CEO of Avantome and Guardant Health
- Jessica Ewing, co-founder and CEO of Literati
- Richard Fairbank (A.B., MBA), co-founder, chairman, and CEO of Capital One
- David Filo (MS), Yahoo! co-founder
- Doris F. Fisher, co-founder of Gap Inc.
- Tully Friedman, founder of Friedman Fleischer & Lowe
- Victor Grinich (Ph.D. 1953), one of the "traitorous eight" who founded Fairchild Semiconductor
- Andrew Grove (Lecturer), founder and former CEO and chairman of Intel
- Prerna Gupta (B.A. 2004), founder of Khu.sh
- Ole Andreas Halvorsen (MBA 1990), co-founder of Viking Global Investors
- Kevin Hartz, co-founder and CEO of Eventbrite
- Reed Hastings (M.S. 1988), Netflix founder
- Trip Hawkins (MBA), founder of Electronic Arts, 3DO, and Digital Chocolate
- Gladys Heldman (MBA), founder of World Tennis and Virginia Slims Women's Tour
- William Hewlett (B.E. 1934, M.E. electrical engineering), founder of Hewlett-Packard, National Medal of Science winner
- Reid Hoffman, co-founder and executive chairman of LinkedIn
- Elizabeth Holmes (non-degreed), founder of Theranos
- Jensen Huang, co-founder of Nvidia
- Jawed Karim, co-founder of YouTube
- Stanley Kennedy Sr. (1912), founder and chairman of Hawaiian Airlines
- Vinod Khosla (MBA), Sun Microsystems co-founder and Kleiner, Perkins, Caufield & Byers partner
- Darren Kimura, inventor of micro concentrating solar power, founder of Sopogy
- Phil Knight (MBA 1961), founder and former CEO of Nike
- Mike Krieger, co-founder of Instagram
- Do Kwon (B.S 2015), co-founder and CEO Terraform Labs who was charged with securities fraud, commodities fraud, wire fraud, and conspiracy
- Sandy Lerner (M.S. statistics and computer science 1981), co-founder of Cisco Systems
- Richard Li (non-degreed), founder of STAR TV (Asia) and chairman of PCCW
- Craig McCaw (A.B.), founder and CEO of McCaw Cellular and founder of Clearwire
- Scott McNealy (MBA), co-founder, chairman, and former CEO of Sun Microsystems
- Peter Mondavi (A.B. 1937), vintner and entrepreneur, co-founder of Robert Mondavi Winery and owner of Charles Krug Winery
- Robert Mondavi (A.B. 1936), vintner and entrepreneur, co-founder of Robert Mondavi Winery and owner of Charles Krug Winery
- Ren Ng (Ph.D. computer science), founder and chief executive officer of Lytro
- Mark Oldman, Vault.com co-founder
- John Overdeck (B.S., M.S.), co-founder and co-chairman of Two Sigma
- David Packard (BA, MA electrical engineering 1934), Hewlett-Packard co-founder
- Larry Page (M.S.), Google co-founder
- Sundar Pichai (MS. 1994), CEO of Alphabet and Google
- Azim Premji, founder and CEO of Wipro Technologies
- Frank Quattrone (MBA '81), billionaire investment banker and founder of Qatalyst Partners
- T.J. Rodgers (Ph.D.), founder and CEO of Cypress Semiconductor
- Blake Ross, Mozilla Firefox co-founder
- Harry M. Rubin, co-founder of Samuel Adams and GT Interactive
- James Sachs (A.M. 1979), IDEO co-founder
- Charles R. Schwab (1959, MBA 1961), founder, chairman, and CEO of Charles Schwab Corporation
- David E. Shaw (Ph.D. 1980), founder of D. E. Shaw & Co.
- Jeffrey Skoll (MBA 1995), first president of eBay and founder of Participant Media
- Evan Spiegel, co-founder of Snapchat
- Tom Steyer, founder of Farallon Capital
- Aaron Swartz (non-degreed), co-founder of reddit
- Kevin Systrom, co-founder of Instagram
- Vlad Tenev, co-founder of Robinhood Markets
- Peter Thiel, PayPal, co-founder of Clarium Capital
- Alan Tripp (A.B. 1985, MBA 1989), founder of SCORE! Educational Centers and InsideTrack
- Tanya Van Court, founder and CEO of Goalsetter
- Tim Westergren, co-founder of Pandora Media
- Jerry Yang (b. 1968), Yahoo! co-founder
- Min Zhu (b. 1948), founder and former CTO of WebEx

=== Other business leaders ===
- Jim Allchin (M.S.), co-president of Microsoft
- Mukesh Ambani (MBA, non-degreed), Reliance Industries Limited chairman
- John Arrillaga (A.B., MBA), Silicon Valley real estate developer
- Steve Ballmer (MBA candidate, non-degreed9), CEO of Microsoft
- Mary Barra (MBA 1990), chair and CEO of General Motors (2014–present)
- Craig Barrett (B.S., Ph.D. 1964), past chairman of Intel, former CEO of Intel
- Jeffrey Bewkes (MBA 1977), Time Warner president and COO
- Paul Bilzerian (born 1950), financier convicted of securities fraud
- R. Martin Chavez (Ph.D.), CFO of Goldman Sachs
- Burton A. Dole, Jr. (BSME, MBA), president, CEO, and chairman of Puritan Bennett
- Pat Dudley (B.A.), president and marketing director of Bethel Heights Vineyard
- Caroline Ellison (B.S. 2016), CEO of Alameda Research who was charged with fraud
- Carly Fiorina (1976), CEO of Hewlett-Packard 1999–2005
- Paul Flaherty (M.S., Ph.D.), co-inventor of the AltaVista search engine
- Scott Forstall (B.S., M.S.), former senior vice president of iPhone software at Apple Inc.
- Bill Franke (B.A., 1959), chairman of Wizz Air and Frontier Airlines
- Sarah Friar (MBA 2000), CEO of Nextdoor and former CFO of Block, Inc.
- Dana Gioia (1973, MBA 1977), vice president at General Foods
- John D. Goldman (M.B.A. 1975), CEO of Richard N. Goldman & Co. Insurance Services
- Peter E. Haas Jr. (B.A., 1969), Levi Strauss & Co. executive
- Christopher Hedrick (A.B. 1984), president and CEO of Intrepid Learning Solutions
- John Hoke III (MBA), chief design officer, Nike, Inc.
- George H. Hume, president and CEO of Basic American Foods
- Mamoru Imura, CEO of Vita Craft Corporation and Vita Craft Japan, inventor of RFIQin
- Guy Kawasaki, venture capitalist
- Kathryn Kennedy, winemaker and winery owner
- Omid Kordestani (MBA), senior vice president of Google
- Stephen D. Lebovitz (B.A. political science), CEO of CBL & Associates Properties
- Victor Li (B.S., M.S. 1985), Hong Kong businessman
- Mao Daolin (MS in EESOR), former CEO of Sina.com
- Marissa Mayer (B.S. symbolic systems, M.S. computer science), CEO of Yahoo!
- Henry McKinnell (MBA, Ph.D.), chairman and former CEO of Pfizer
- Stephen McLin (M.S. mechanical engineering, MBA), former Bank of America executive
- John Morgridge (MBA 1957), Cisco Systems chairman
- Hiroaki Nakanishi (M.S. 1979), president of Hitachi
- Rodney O'Neal, president and chief executive officer of Delphi Automotive
- Huw Pill (Ph.D., 1995), chief economist of the Bank of England
- Stan Polovets (MBA, 1989), energy executive and philanthropist
- Ruth Porat, CFO of Alphabet Inc./Google. and former CFO of Morgan Stanley
- Chetan Puttagunta, general partner at Benchmark
- Kirthiga Reddy, former managing director at Facebook India
- Rajeev Samant, founder and CEO of Sula Vineyards
- John Turner Sargent, Jr., business associate of Doubleday and CEO of Holtzbrinck Publishing Group
- Debby Soo, CEO of Open Table
- Alan J. Viergutz, chairman of Grupo Centec and former president of the Venezuelan Oil Chamber
- David Wehner, CFO of Facebook
- Darryl Willis (M.S. 2007), BP vice president of claims featured in commercials about the Deepwater Horizon oil spill
- John C. Young (B.S., 1936, engineer degree, 1937), Chinatown San Francisco business and community leader

== Computer science and electrical engineering ==
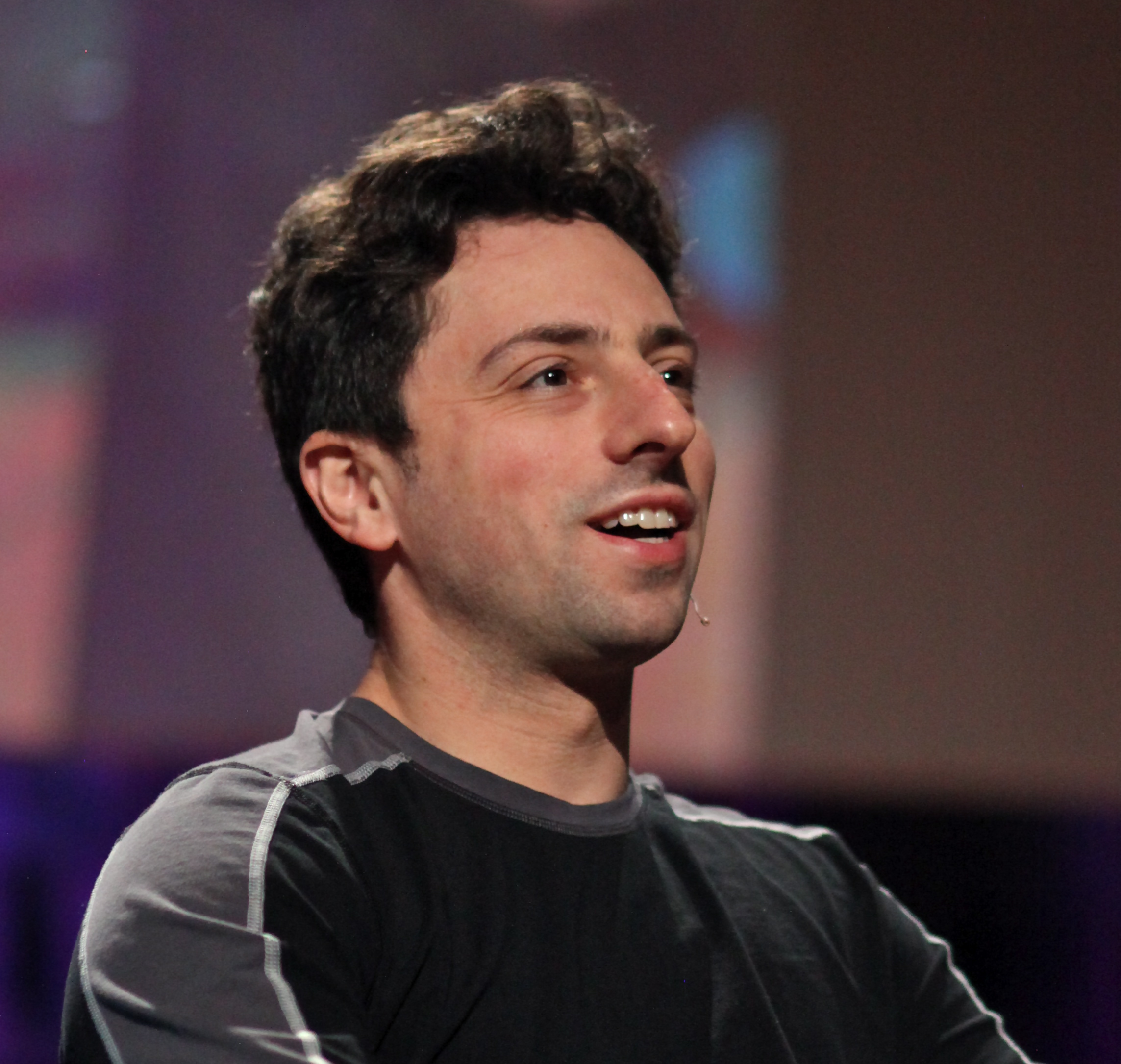
Sergey Brin

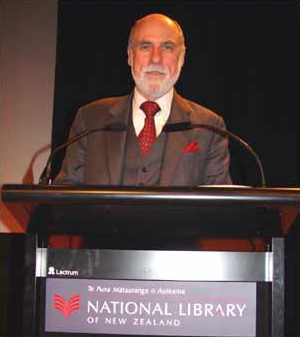
Vinton Cerf

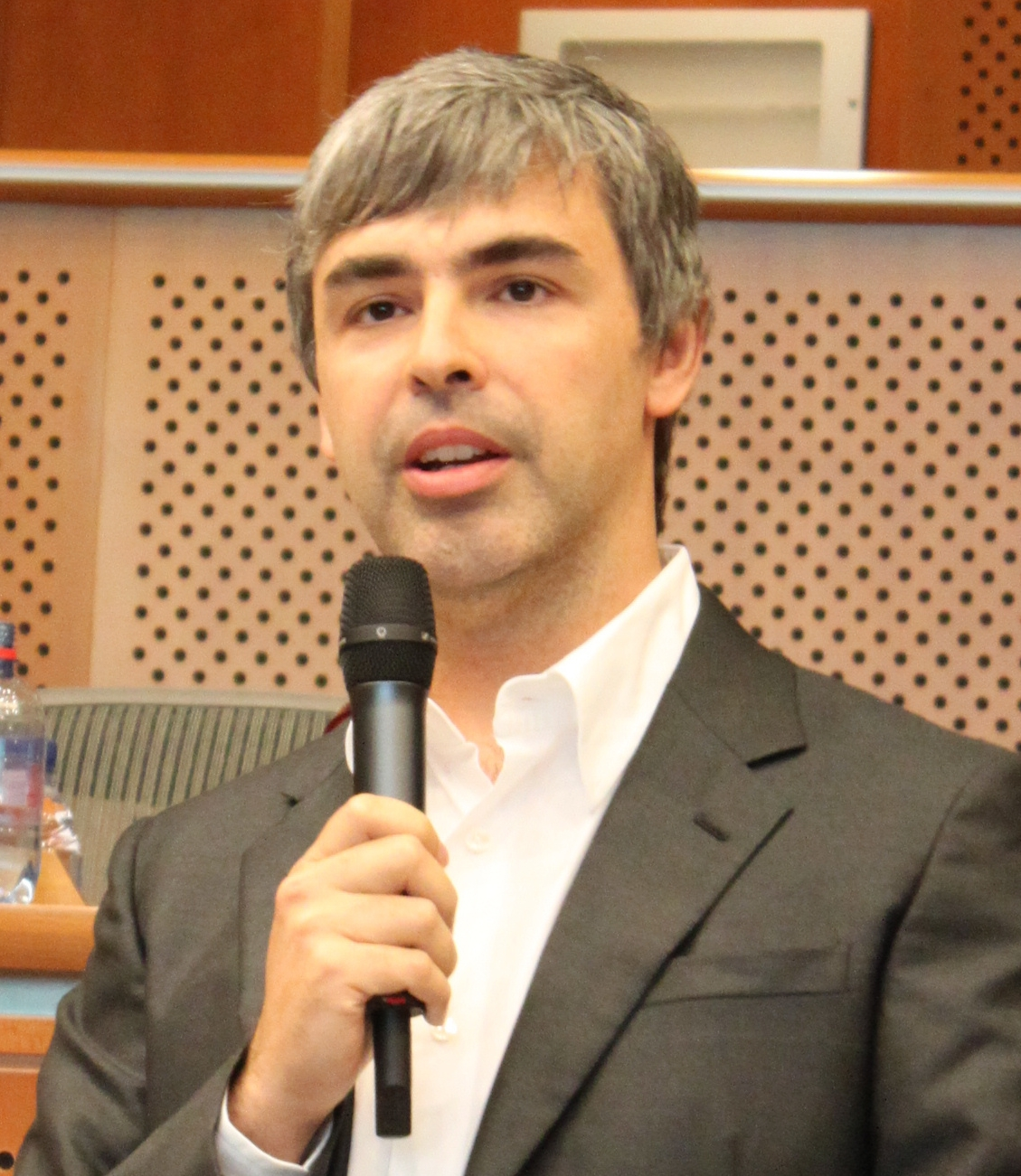
Larry Page

- Norman Abramson (Ph.D. electrical engineering), 2007 IEEE Alexander Graham Bell Medal winner, developed ALOHAnet
- Anant Agarwal (Ph.D. electrical engineering), president of EdX at MIT
- Ružena Bajcsy (Ph.D. computer science), winner of 2009 Benjamin Franklin Medal in Computer and Cognitive Science
- Andy Bechtolsheim (non-degreed), designer of the first networked SUN workstation
- Anant Bhardwaj (M.S. computer science), founder of Instabase
- David Boggs (Ph.D.), co-inventor of Ethernet
- Lawrence M. Breed (M.S.), created the first computer animation language and Grace Murray Hopper Award winner
- Sergey Brin (M.S.), developer of Google search and Marconi Prize winner
- Rodney Brooks (Ph.D. 1981), director of MIT computer science and artificial intelligence lab, winner of IJCAI Computers and Thought Award
- Horace Casey (M.S. 1959, Ph.D. 1964), electrical engineer
- Vint Cerf (B.S. 1965), Internet pioneer, co-inventor of TCP/IP internet protocol, and Turing Award and Marconi Prize-winner
- Donald D. Chamberlin (M.S., Ph.D. electrical engineering), coinventor of SQL, and SIGMOD Edgar F. Codd Innovations Award winner
- Surajit Chaudhuri (Ph.D. computer science), SIGMOD Edgar F. Codd Innovations Award winner
- John M. Cioffi (Ph.D. electrical engineering), pioneer in Digital subscriber line, winner of Marconi Prize and IEEE Alexander Graham Bell Medal
- Thomas M. Cover (Ph.D. electrical engineering 1964), information theorist
- Donald Cox (Ph.D. electrical engineering), winner of the IEEE Alexander Graham Bell Medal
- Steve Deering (Ph.D. electrical engineering), inventor of IP multicast
- Whitfield Diffie (non-degreed), pioneer in public-key cryptography, noted for Diffie-Hellman-Merkle key exchange, and Marconi Prize winner
- Ray Dolby (B.S. 1933), inventor of noise reduction system and winner of the National Medal of Technology and Innovation
- Charles Stark Draper (A.B. 1922), engineer and inventor, often called "the father of inertial navigation"
- Les Earnest, research scientist, created the first spell check and first cursive-writing recognizer
- David Eppstein (B.S. 1984), computer scientist
- Paul Flaherty (MS, Ph.D.), inventor of AltaVista search engine
- Patri Friedman, software engineer at Google
- Richard P. Gabriel (Ph.D.), computer scientist
- Héctor García-Molina (Ph.D.), SIGMOD Edgar F. Codd Innovations Award winner
- Craig Gentry (Ph.D.), 2010 Grace Murray Hopper Award winner; noted for solving homomorphic encryption
- Edward Ginzton (Ph.D.), pioneer of microwave electronics and winner of IEEE Medal of Honor
- Ian Goodfellow (B.S., M.S.), developer of generative adversarial networks
- Susan L. Graham (Ph.D. computer science), IEEE John Von Neumann prize winner
- William Webster Hansen (Ph.D.), pioneer of microwave electronics
- Stephen E. Harris (M.S., Ph.D. electrical engineering), noted for "slow" light research
- Martin Hellman (M.S. 1967, Ph.D. 1969 electrical engineering), pioneer in public-key cryptography, noted for Diffie-Hellman-Merkle public key exchange, Marconi Prize winner
- Charles Herrold, creator of the first radio station in the world
- Ted Hoff (Ph.D. 1962), inventor of microprocessor, winner of Kyoto Prize, winner of National Medal of Technology and Innovation
- John Hopcroft (Ph.D. 1964 electrical engineering), Turing Award-winning computer scientist
- Taylor Howard (B.S. electrical engineering), inventor of the home satellite dish
- Dan Ingalls (M.S. computer science), Grace Murray Hopper Award winner
- Soren Johnson (A.B., M.S.), video-game designer
- Leslie Kaelbling (Ph.D. computer science), winner of IJCAI Computers and Thought Award
- Paul G. Kaminski (Ph.D. in AA, 1971), National Medal of Technology winner
- Lydia Kavraki (Ph.D. computer science), 2000 Grace Murray Hopper Award winner
- Alan Kay (postdoc), Turing Award-winning computer scientist
- Dan Klein (Ph.D. computer science), 2006 Grace Murray Hopper Award winner
- Paul W. Klipsch (M.S. 1934), high-fidelity audio pioneer
- Daphne Koller (Ph.D.), winner of ACM-Infosys Foundation Award, winner of IJCAI Computers and Thought Award
- Douglas Lenat (Ph.D. computer science), winner of IJCAI Computers and Thought Award
- Barbara Liskov (Ph.D.), first female Ph.D. in computer science in the US and Turing Award winner
- John N. Little (M.E. 1980), co-creator of MATLAB
- Albert Macovski (Ph.D.), the authority on computerized imaging systems with 150 patents
- Theodore Maiman (M.E. electrical engineering, Ph.D. physics), inventor of the first working laser
- Scott A. McGregor (B.A., M.S. 1978), lead developer of Windows 1.0 and CEO of Philips Semiconductors and Broadcom Corporation
- Ralph Merkle (Ph.D. 1979, EE), pioneer in public key cryptography, noted for Diffie-Hellman-Merkle key exchange
- Cleve Moler (Ph.D., M.E. 1980), co-creator of MATLAB
- Roger Moore, Grace Murray Hopper Award winner
- Hans Moravec (Ph.D. 1980), co-designer of Stanford CART, the first computer-controlled robot car
- Allen Newell (B.S.), pioneer of artificial intelligence, Turing Award-winning computer scientist
- Jim K. Omura (Ph.D. electrical engineering), IEEE Alexander Graham Bell Medal winner
- Larry Page (M.S.), developer of Google search engine and Marconi Prize winner
- Kumar Patel (Ph.D. electrical engineering), inventor of carbon dioxide laser, National Medal of Science winner
- Donald Pederson (Ph.D. electrical engineering), pioneer in SPICE, winner of IEEE Medal of Honor
- Amir Pnueli (postdoc), Turing Award-winning computer scientist
- Raj Reddy (Ph.D. 1966), Turing Award-winning computer scientist, founder of robotics institute at Carnegie Mellon University
- Ronald Rivest (Ph.D. 1974), cryptographer, Turing Award-winning computer scientist
- Mike Schroepfer (B.S. 1997, M.S. 1999), developer of the Firefox browser at Mozilla; vice president of engineering at Facebook
- Edward Shortliffe (Ph.D.), Grace Murray Hopper Award winner, inventor of the Mycin
- Charles Simonyi (M.S., Ph.D. 1977 computer science), inventor of Microsoft Word, former chief architect at Microsoft
- Daniel Sleator (Ph.D.), computer scientist
- Alfred Spector (Ph.D.), computer scientist
- Robert Tarjan (Ph.D. 1972), Turing Award-winning computer scientist
- Frederick Terman (B.S. chemistry, M.E. electrical engineering), "father of Silicon Valley", National Medal of Science winner
- Russell Varian (Ph.D.), co-inventor of Klystron, the foundation of radar
- Sigurd Varian (M.S.), co-inventor of Klystron, the foundation of
- John Robert Woodyard (Ph.D. 1940), pioneer in microwave electronics, inventor of "doping" in semiconductors

== Diplomacy ==
=== U.S. ambassadors ===
- Michael J. Adler (A.M. 1989), 4th U.S. ambassador to South Sudan (2022–present)
- Michael R. Carpenter (A.B. 1993), 8th U.S. ambassador to the OSCE (2021–present)
- Bathsheba Nell Crocker (A.B. 1991), U.S. permanent representative to the United Nations in Geneva (2021–2025), 26th U.S. assistant secretary of state for international organization affairs (2014–2017)
- William J. Crowe (M.Ed. 1956), 60th U.S. Ambassador to the United Kingdom, 11th Chairman of the Joint Chiefs of Staff
- Eileen Donahoe (J.D. 1988, A.M. 1989), U.S. ambassador to the U.N. Human Rights Council (2010–2013), Special Envoy and Coordinator for Digital Freedom (2023–2025)
- Karl Eikenberry (A.M. 1994), U.S. ambassador to Afghanistan (2009–2011), U.S. Army lieutenant general, commander of American-led Coalition forces in Afghanistan (2002–2003, 2005–2009)
- March Fong Eu (Ed.D. 1954), 2nd U.S. ambassador to Micronesia (1994–1996), 25th California secretary of state
- John Gavin (A.B. 1952), 22nd U.S. ambassador to Mexico (1981–1986)
- Gary A. Grappo (M.B.A. 1982), 11th U.S. ambassador to Oman (2006–2009)
- William Kennard (A.B. 1978), 18th U.S. ambassador to the EU (2009–2013), 27th chairman of the U.S. Federal Communications Commission (1997–2001)
- Hans G. Klemm (A.M. 1996), 4th U.S. ambassador to East Timor (2007–2010)
- Lisa A. Johnson (A.B. 1989), 9th U.S. ambassador to Namibia (2017–present)
- Laurence W. Lane Jr. (A.B. 1942), 17th U.S. ambassador to Australia (concurrently, 1985–1989), 5th U.S. ambassador to Nauru (concurrently, 1985–1989)
- Mark Lippert (A.B. 1997, A.M. 1998), 22nd U.S. ambassador to South Korea (2014–2017)
- Susan McCaw (A.B. 1984), 18th U.S. ambassador to Austria (2006–2007)
- Michael McFaul (A.B., M.A. 1986), 7th U.S. ambassador to Russia (2012–2014)
- William T. Monroe (A.B. 1972), 14th U.S. ambassador to Bahrain (2004–2007)
- Carlos R. Moreno (J.D. 1975), 9th U.S. ambassador to Belize (2014–2017), associate justice of the California Supreme Court (2001–2011), judge of the Central District of California (1998–2001)
- Richard Morningstar (LL.M. 1970), 10th U.S. ambassador to Azerbaijan (2012–2015), 14th U.S. ambassador to the EU (1999–2001)
- Herbert S. Okun (A.B. 1951), 3rd U.S. ambassador to East Germany (1980–1983)
- Louis O'Neill (A.B. 1990, A.M. 1992), U.S. representative to the Organization for Security and Cooperation in Europe and Head of Mission to Moldova (2006–2008)
- Carlos Pascual (A.B. 1980), 28th U.S. ambassador to Mexico (2009–2011), 4th U.S. ambassador to Ukraine (2000–2003)
- Susan Rice (A.B. 1986), 27th U.S. ambassador to the U.N. (2009–2013)
- Thomas T. Riley (B.S. 1972), 18th U.S. ambassador to Morocco (2003–2009)
- John Roos (A.B. 1977, J.D. 1980), 29th U.S. ambassador to Japan (2009–2013)
- Ronald P. Spogli (A.B. 1970), 30th U.S. ambassador to Italy (concurrently, 2005–2009), 1st U.S. ambassador to San Marino (concurrently, 2005–2009)
- Robert H. Tuttle (A.B. 1965), 32nd U.S. ambassador to the United Kingdom (2005–2009)
- Beth Van Schaack (A.B. 1991), 7th U.S. ambassador-at-large for Global Criminal Justice (2022–2025)
- James B. Warlick, Jr. (A.B. 1978), 16th U.S. ambassador to Bulgaria (2010–2012)
- Earl Anthony Wayne (A.B. 1973), 29th U.S. ambassador to Mexico (2011–2015), 29th U.S. ambassador to Argentina (2007–2009)
- Alice Wells (A.B. 1985), 23rd U.S. ambassador to Jordan (2014–2017)
- Alexa L. Wesner (A.B. 1994), 21st U.S. ambassador to Austria (2013–2017)
- William A. Wilson (B.S. 1936, M.S. 1937), 1st U.S. ambassador to Vatican City (1984–1986)

=== Other U.S. diplomats ===
- Goli Ameri (A.B. 1977, A.M. 1979), 12th U.S. assistant secretary of state for educational and cultural affairs, 2008–2009
- Eric J. Boswell (A.B. 1970), 4th and 9th U.S. assistant secretary of state for diplomatic security, 1996–1998 and 2008–2012
- Mallory Stewart (J.D. 2000), 5th U.S. assistant secretary of state for arms control, verification, and compliance, 2022–present

== Entertainment ==
=== Film and television ===
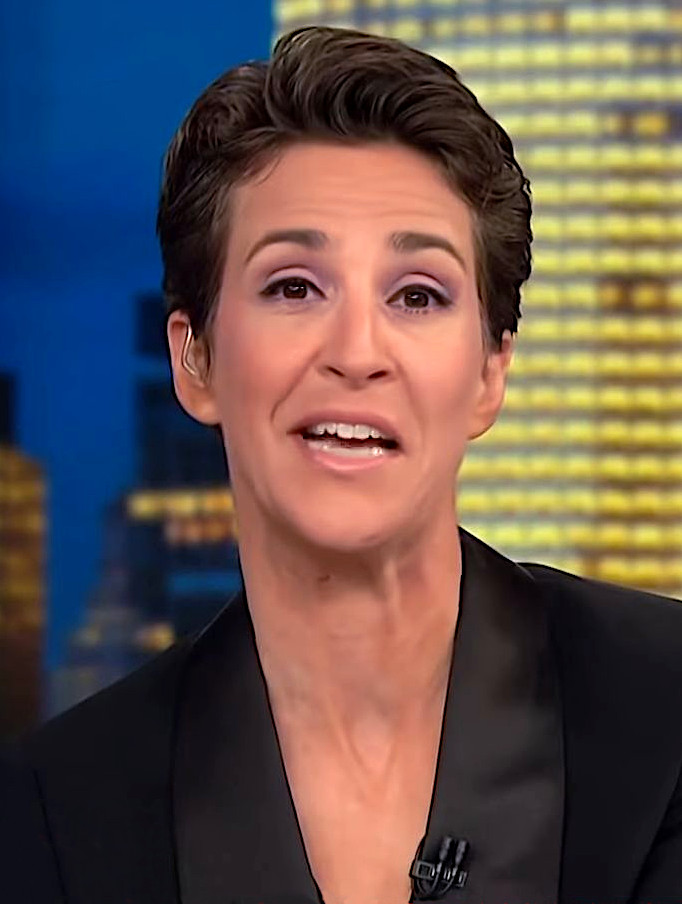
Rachel Maddow

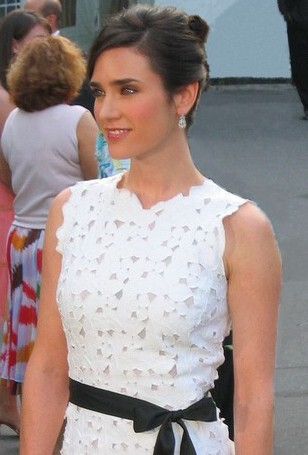
Jennifer Connelly

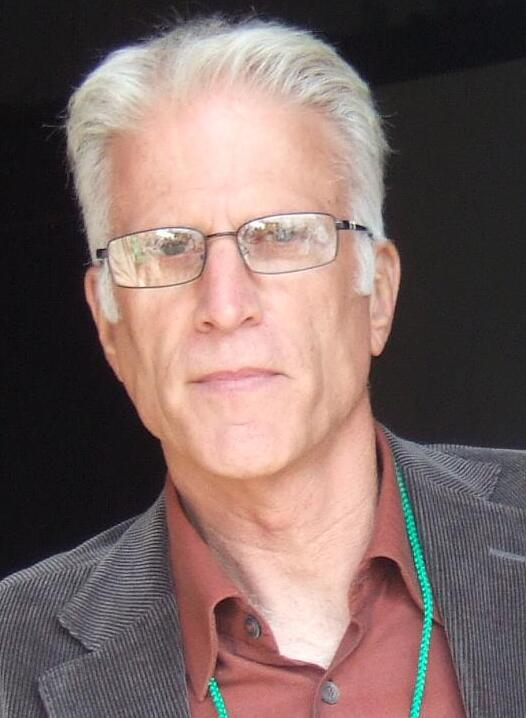
Ted Danson

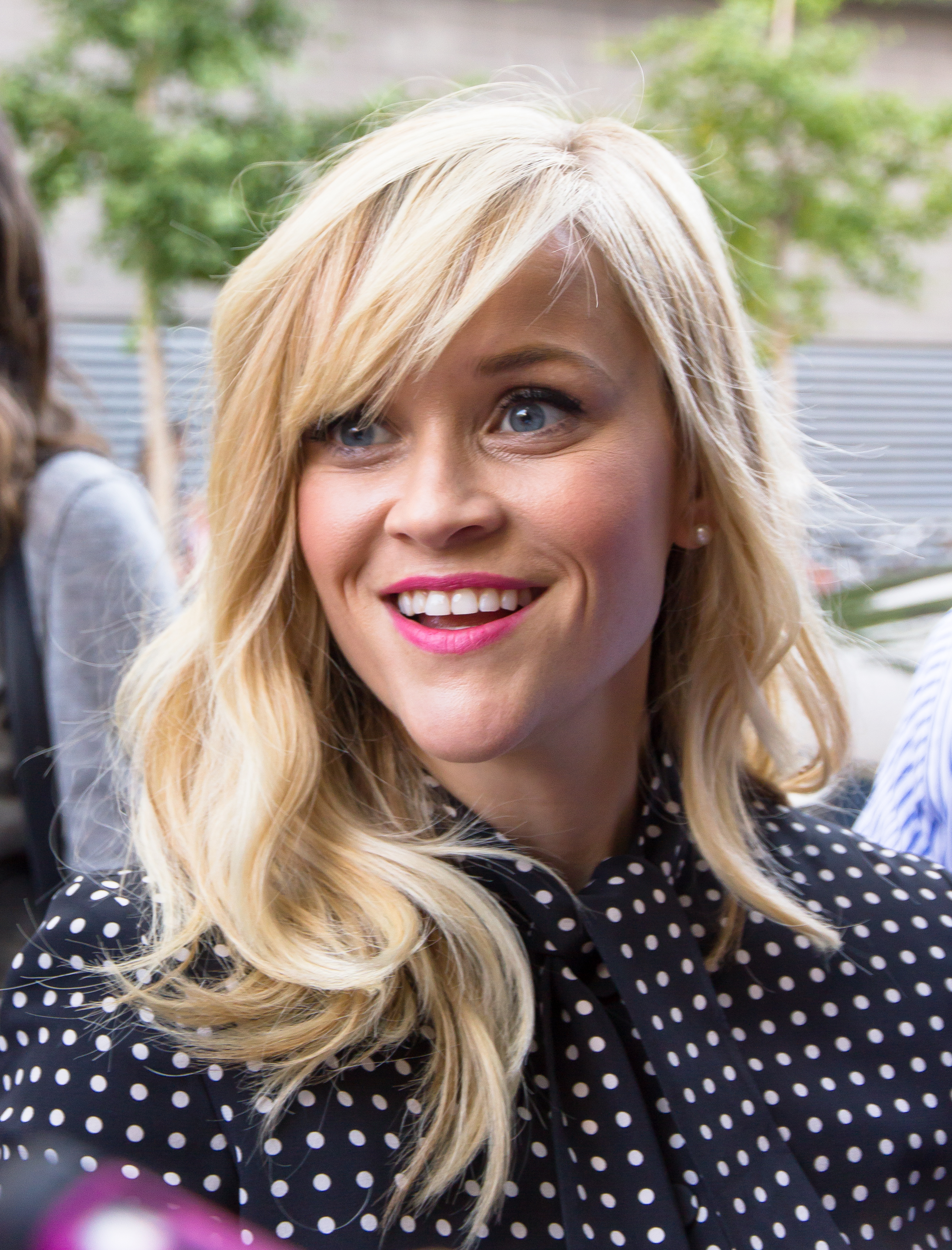
Reese Witherspoon

- Andy Adler, television personality
- Aimee Allison, public affairs television and radio host, political activist
- Maudy Ayunda, actress and singer-songwriter
- Laura Bialis, movie director
- Kevin Bleyer, writer for The Daily Show with Jon Stewart
- Stephen Book, director, actor, and acting teacher
- Richard Boone, actor
- Andre Braugher, actor
- David Brown, movie producer
- Phil Brown, actor
- Sterling K. Brown (A.B. 1998), actor
- Frank Cady, actor
- Britton Caillouette, filmmaker
- Gretchen Carlson (A.B. 1988), broadcast journalist and television personality on Fox & Friends
- Melanie Chandra (B.S. 2006), actress known for Code Black
- Barney Cheng, actor, director, writer, and producer
- Jennifer Connelly (non-degreed), actress
- Roger Corman, producer and director
- Ted Danson (non-degreed), actor
- Richard Engel (1996), NBC reporter and author
- Allison Fonte, former Mouseketeer from The New Mickey Mouse Club
- Dana Fox, screenwriter
- Isabelle Fuhrman, actress
- Jordan Gelber, actor
- Nicholas Gonzalez, actor
- Rebecca Hanover (B.A. 2001), television writer, winner of Daytime Emmy Award for her work on Guiding Light
- Al Harrington (A.B. 1958), actor known for Hawaii Five-O
- Ron Hayes, actor
- Edith Head (A.M. 1920), costume designer
- Colin Higgins, film screenwriter, director, actor, and producer
- Ollie Johnston, pioneering Disney animator
- Daryn Kagan, CNN ex-anchor
- Jordan Kerner, film and television producer, former network and studio executive
- Don King (A.B. 1983), surfing photographer and cinematographer
- Yul Kwon, winner of Survivor: Cook Islands
- Heather Langenkamp, actress
- Crystal Lee, Miss California 2013, first runner-up, Miss America 2014
- Robert Lehrer, actor
- Warren Leight (A.B. 1977), Pulitzer Prize finalist, playwright, screenwriter, film director, and television producer
- Rachel Maddow (A.B. 1994), MSNBC television host
- Blake Masters (A.B. 1993), screenwriter, director, and producer
- Ty McCormick, award-winning foreign correspondent
- Alex Michel, producer and television personality, best known for The Bachelor
- Avi Nash, actor
- Lloyd Nolan (non-degreed), actor
- Sharmeen Obaid-Chinoy, director of two Academy Award-winning documentaries
- Jack Palance, actor
- Alexander Payne, film director
- Danny Pintauro (A.B. 1998), actor
- Rick Porras, movie producer
- Megyn Price, actress
- Issa Rae, actress, writer, director, and producer
- Alex Rich, actor
- Edward L. Rissien, film producer
- Jay Roach, film director
- Allen Rucker (M.A. 1977), writer and television producer, wrote an Emmy Award-winning documentary Two Days in October
- Skyler Samuels, actress
- Ben Savage (B.A. 2004), actor
- Fred Savage (A.B. 1998), actor
- Susan Shadburne, film director and screenwriter
- Sam Simon, television writer and producer
- Eliel Swinton, actor
- Cynthia Wade, documentary filmmaker
- Kathryn Wallace, documentary filmmaker
- Sigourney Weaver (A.B. 1972), actress
- Adam West (non-degreed), actor
- Reese Witherspoon (non-degreed), actress
- Hank Worden, actor
- Alice Wu, writer and director of Saving Face
- Richard Zanuck, movie producer

=== Internet personalities ===
- Cary Huang (B.S. 2020), co-creator of the animated web series Battle for Dream Island and the interactive visualization tool The Scale of the Universe
- Safiya Nygaard, YouTuber

=== Music ===
- Samuel Adams, composer
- Ronald Barnes (M.A. 1961), carillonist and musicologist
- Allette Brooks, musician
- Torry Castellano, former drummer of The Donnas
- Jack Conte, musician, member of Pomplamoose
- Nataly Dawn, member of Pomplamoose
- Sameer Gadhia, lead singer of Young the Giant
- Larry Grenadier, jazz bassist
- Dave Guard, folk singer and songwriter
- Tom Harrell, jazz trumpeter and composer
- Jidenna, hip hop and R&B artist
- Mikel Jollett, lead singer of The Airborne Toxic Event
- K.Flay, rapper
- Kylee, singer
- Jon Nakamatsu, pianist
- James Nash, musician
- Andrew Robert Nielsen, rapper best known by his stage name MC Lars
- Bruce Robinson, singer/songwriter
- Sandor Salgo, Carmel Bach Festival leader for thirty years
- Anton Schwartz, jazz saxophonist
- Tablo (A.B. 2001, M.A. 2002), hip hop recording artist and record producer
- Vienna Teng, musician
- Christopher Tin, composer
- Fei Xiang, singer

=== Radio ===
- Kris Atteberry, Twins Radio Network studio host
- Elizabeth Farnsworth (A.M.), broadcast journalist
- Donna Hanover, radio and television news anchor and personality

== Judiciary ==
=== U.S. Supreme Court ===
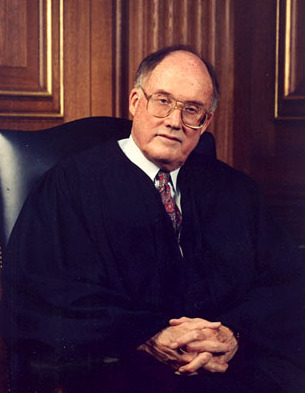
William Rehnquist

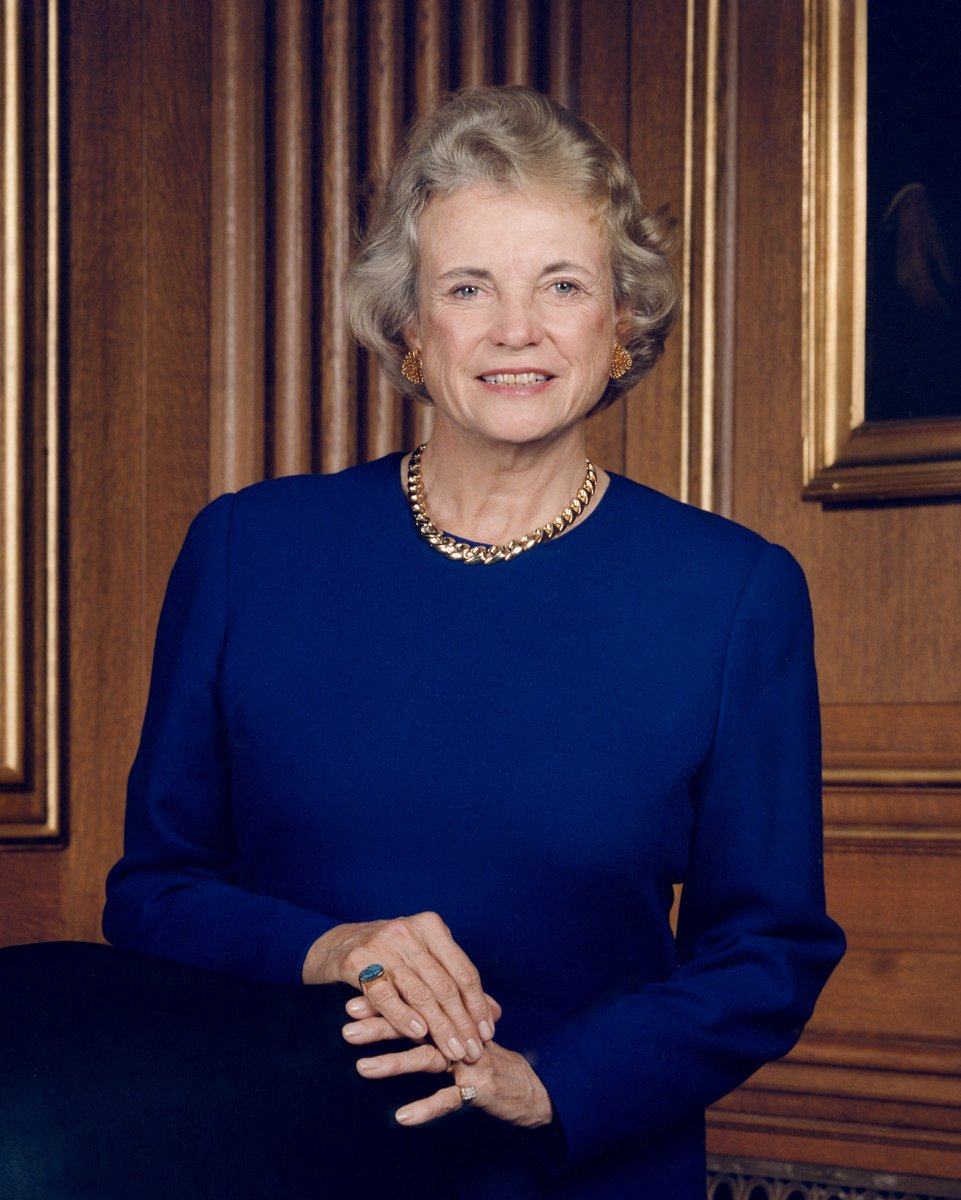
Sandra Day O'Connor

- Stephen Breyer (A.B. 1959), associate justice of the Supreme Court of the United States (1994–2022), judge (1980–1994) and chief judge (1990–1994) of the First Circuit Court of Appeals
- Anthony Kennedy (A.B. 1958), associate justice of the Supreme Court of the United States (1988–2018), judge of the Ninth Circuit Court of Appeals (1975–1988)
- Sandra Day O'Connor (A.B. 1950, LL.B. 1952), first female associate justice of the Supreme Court of the United States (1981–2006), judge of the Arizona Court of Appeals (1979–1981), Arizona state senator (1969–1975), first female U.S. state senate majority leader (1973–1975)
- William Rehnquist (A.B. 1948, A.M. 1948, LL.B. 1952), chief justice of the United States (1986–2005), associate justice of the Supreme Court of the United States (1972–1986)

=== U.S. courts of appeals ===
- Carlos Bea (A.B. 1956, LL.B. 1958), judge of the Ninth Circuit Court of Appeals (2003–2019)
- Consuelo Callahan (A.B. 1972), judge of the Ninth Circuit Court of Appeals (2003–present), associate justice of the California Court of Appeal (1996–2003)
- Richard Harvey Chambers (LL.B. 1932), judge (1954–1976) and chief judge (1959–1976) of the Ninth Circuit Court of Appeals
- Daniel P. Collins (J.D. 1988), judge of the Ninth Circuit Court of Appeals (2019–present)
- Ben C. Duniway (LL.B. 1931), judge of the Ninth Circuit Court of Appeals (1961–1976), associate justice of the California Court of Appeal (1959–1961)
- Allison H. Eid (A.B. 1987), judge of the Tenth Circuit Court of Appeals (2017–present), associate justice of the Colorado Supreme Court (2006–2017)
- Raymond C. Fisher (LL.B. 1966), judge of the Ninth Circuit Court of Appeals (1999–2013)
- Betty Binns Fletcher (A.B. 1943), judge of the Ninth Circuit Court of Appeals (1979–1998)
- Michelle Friedland (B.S. 1995, J.D. 2000), judge of the Ninth Circuit Court of Appeals (2014–present)
- Britt Grant (J.D. 2007), judge of the Eleventh Circuit Court of Appeals (2018–present), associate justice of the Georgia Supreme Court (2017–2018)
- Cynthia Holcomb Hall (A.B. 1951, LL.B. 1954), judge of the Ninth Circuit Court of Appeals (1984–1997), judge of the Central District of California (1981–1984), judge of the U.S. Tax Court (1972–1981)
- James Ho (A.B. 1995), judge of the Fifth Circuit Court of Appeals (2018–present)
- Shirley Hufstedler (LL.B. 1949), judge of the Ninth Circuit Court of Appeals (1968–1979), associate justice of the California Court of Appeal (1966–1968), first U.S. secretary of education (1979–1981)
- Procter Ralph Hug Jr. (LL.B. 1958), judge (1977–2002) and chief judge (1996–2000) of the Ninth Circuit Court of Appeals
- Gilbert H. Jertberg (A.B. 1920, LL.B. 1922), judge of the Ninth Circuit Court of Appeals (1958–1967), judge of the Southern District of California (1955–1958)
- Cheryl Ann Krause (J.D. 1993), judge of the Third Circuit Court of Appeals (2014–present)
- Dal Millington Lemmon (A.B. 1908), judge of the Ninth Circuit Court of Appeals (1954–1958), judge of the Northern District of California (1947–1954)
- Scott Matheson Jr. (A.B. 1975), judge of the Tenth Circuit Court of Appeals (2010–present), dean of the University of Utah College of Law (1998–2006), U.S. Attorney for the District of Utah (1993–1997)
- Steven Menashi (J.D. 2008), judge of the Second Circuit Court of Appeals (2019–present)
- Justin Miller (A.B. 1911, LL.B. 1914), judge of the D.C. Circuit Court of Appeals (1937–1945), dean of the University of Southern California Law School (1927–1930) and the Duke University School of Law (1930–1935)
- William Albert Norris (LL.B. 1954), judge of the Ninth Circuit Court of Appeals (1980–1994)
- John B. Owens (J.D. 1996), judge of the Ninth Circuit Court of Appeals (2014–present)
- Florence Y. Pan (J.D. 1993), judge of the D.C. Circuit Court of Appeals (2022–present), judge of the District of Columbia (2021–2022)
- Peter J. Phipps (J.D. 1998), judge of the Third Circuit Court of Appeals (2019–present), judge of the Western District of Pennsylvania (2018–2019)
- John M. Rogers (A.B. 1970), judge of the Sixth Circuit Court of Appeals (2002–2018)
- Pamela Ann Rymer (LL.B. 1964), judge of the Ninth Circuit Court of Appeals (1989–2011), judge of the Central District of California (1983–1989)
- Oliver Seth (A.B. 1937), judge (1962–1984) and chief judge (1977–1984) of the Tenth Circuit Court of Appeals
- Sri Srinivasan (A.B. 1989, M.B.A. 1995, J.D. 1995), judge (2013–present) and chief judge (2020–present) of the D.C. Circuit Court of Appeals
- Holly A. Thomas (A.B. 2000), judge of the Ninth Circuit Court of Appeals (2022–present)

=== U.S. district courts ===
- Wayne Alley (A.B. 1952, LL.B. 1957), judge of the Western District of Oklahoma (1985–1999), dean of the University of Oklahoma College of Law (1981–1985)
- D. Brook Bartlett (LL.B. 1962), judge (1981–2000) and chief judge (1995–2000) of the Western District of Missouri
- Jesus Bernal (J.D. 1989), judge of the Central District of California (2012–present)
- Benjamin Franklin Bledsoe (A.B. 1896), judge of the Southern District of California (1914–1925)
- Rudi M. Brewster (LL.B. 1960), judge of the Southern District of California (1984–1998)
- Tiffany Cartwright (B.A. 2007, J.D. 2010), judge of the Western District of Washington (2023–present)
- Paul G. Cassell (A.B. 1979, J.D. 1984), judge of the District of Utah (2002–2007)
- Deborah K. Chasanow (J.D. 1974), judge (1993–2014) and chief judge (2010–2014) of the District of Maryland
- Dana L. Christensen (A.B. 1973), judge (2011–2025) and chief judge (2013–2020) of the District of Montana
- Samuel Conti (LL.B. 1948), judge of the Northern District of California (1970–1987)
- Christopher R. Cooper (J.D. 1993), judge of the District of Columbia (2014–present)
- Walter Early Craig (A.B. 1931, LL.B. 1934), judge (1963–1979) and chief judge (1973–1979) of the District of Arizona
- James Donato (J.D. 1988), judge of the Northern District of California (2014–present)
- Gary Feinerman (J.D. 1991), judge of the Northern District of Illinois (2010–2022)
- Jeremy Fogel (A.B. 1971), judge of the Northern District of California (1998–2014), director of the Federal Judicial Center (2011–2018)
- Haywood Gilliam (J.D. 1994), judge of the Northern District of California (2014–present)
- Irma Elsa Gonzalez (A.B. 1970), judge (1992–2013) and chief judge (2005–2012) of the Southern District of California
- Joan B. Gottschall (J.D. 1973), judge of the Northern District of Illinois (1996–2012)
- Thomas P. Griesa (LL.B. 1958), judge (1972–2000) and chief judge (1993–2000) of the Southern District of New York
- Phyllis J. Hamilton (A.B. 1974), judge (2000–2021) and chief judge (2014–2021) of the Northern District of California
- Harry Lindley Hupp (A.B. 1953, LL.B. 1955), judge of the Central District of California (1984–1997)
- Susan Illston (J.D. 1973), judge of the Northern District of California (1995–2013)
- Rachel Kovner (J.D. 2006), judge of the Eastern District of New York (2019–present)
- Fred Kunzel (A.B. 1925, LL.B. 1927), judge (1959–1969) and chief judge (1967–1969) of the Southern District of California
- Charles A. Legge (A.B. 1952, LL.B. 1954), judge of the Northern District of California (1984–2001)
- David F. Levi (J.D. 1980), judge (1990–2007) and chief judge (2003–2007) of the Eastern District of California, dean of the Duke University School of Law (2007–2018), U.S. Attorney for the Eastern District of California (1986–1990)
- Lawrence Tupper Lydick (A.B. 1938, LL.B. 1942), judge of the Central District of California (1971–1984)
- Linda Hodge McLaughlin (A.B. 1963), judge of the Central District of California (1992–1999)
- John Mendez (A.B. 1977), judge of the Eastern District of California (2008–2022), U.S. Attorney for the Northern District of California (1992–1993)
- Brian Morris (A.B. 1987, A.M. 1987, J.D. 1992), judge (2013–present) and chief judge (2020–present) of the District of Montana, associate justice of the Montana Supreme Court (2005–2013)
- Kimberly J. Mueller (J.D. 1995), judge (2010–2024) and chief judge (2020–2024) of the Eastern District of California
- Sarala Nagala (B.A. 2005), judge of the District of Connecticut (2021–present)
- S. James Otero (J.D. 1976), judge of the Central District of California (2003–2018)
- Halil Suleyman Ozerden (J.D. 1998), judge (2007–present) and chief judge (2024–present) of the Southern District of Mississippi
- Robert Francis Peckham (A.B. 1941, LL.B. 1945), judge (1966–1988) and chief judge (1976–1988) of the Northern District of California
- Rebecca L. Pennell (J.D. 1996), judge of the Eastern District of Washington (2024–present), judge of the Washington Court of Appeals (2016–2024)
- Gene E. K. Pratter (A.B. 1971), judge of the Eastern District of Pennsylvania (2004–2024)
- Mónica Ramírez Almadani (J.D. 2004), judge of the Central District of California (2023–present)
- John Skylstead Rhoades Sr. (A.B. 1948), judge of the Southern District of California (1985–1995)
- John Rolly Ross (LL.B. 1926), judge (1954–1963) and chief judge (1961–1963) of the District of Nevada
- George P. Schiavelli (A.B. 1970), judge of the Central District of California (2004–2008)
- James V. Selna (A.B. 1967, LL.B. 1970), judge of the Central District of California (2003–2020)
- Manish S. Shah (A.B. 1994), judge of the Northern District of Illinois (2014–present)
- Fern M. Smith (A.B. 1972, J.D. 1975), judge of the Northern District of California (1988–2003), director of the Federal Judicial Center (1999–2003)
- Laurie Smith Camp (A.B. 1974), judge (2001–2018) and chief judge (2011–2018) of the District of Nebraska
- Christina A. Snyder (J.D. 1972), judge of the Central District of California (1997–2016)
- Gus J. Solomon (LL.B. 1929), judge (1949–1971) and chief judge (1958–1971) of the District of Oregon
- Richard G. Stearns (A.B. 1968), judge of the District of Massachusetts (1993–present)
- Sunshine Sykes (A.B. 1997, J.D. 2001), judge of the Central District of California (2022–present)
- Bruce Rutherford Thompson (LL.B. 1936), judge of the District of Nevada (1963–1978)
- Hernán D. Vera (A.B. 1991), judge of the Central District of California (2023–present)
- Vaughn Walker (LL.B. 1970), judge (1989–2011) and chief judge (2004–2010) of the Northern District of California
- James Ware (J.D. 1972), judge (1990–2012) and chief judge (2010–2012) of the Northern District of California
- Stanley Alexander Weigel (A.B. 1926, LL.B. 1928), judge of the Northern District of California (1962–1982)
- Claudia Ann Wilken (A.B. 1971), judge (1993–2014) and chief judge (2012–2014) of the Northern District of California
- David Kent Winder (LL.B. 1958), judge (1979–1997) and chief judge (1993–1997) of the District of Utah
- Noël Wise (J.S.M. 2002), judge of the Northern District of California (2024–present)

=== Other U.S. federal courts ===
- Liam P. Hardy (M.S. 1996), judge of the U.S. Court of Appeals for the Armed Forces (2020–present)
- Rose E. Jenkins (A.B. 2005, A.M. 2005), judge of the U.S. Tax Court (2024–present)
- Charles F. Lettow (LL.B. 1968), judge of the U.S. Court of Federal Claims (2003–2018)
- Christine Odell Cook Miller (B.S. 1966), judge of the U.S. Court of Federal Claims (1982–2013)
- Cary Douglas Pugh (A.M. 1988), judge of the U.S. Tax Court (2014–present)

=== State supreme courts ===
- Brent R. Appel (A.B. 1973, A.M. 1973), associate justice of the Iowa Supreme Court (2006–2022)
- Alex Bryner (J.D. 1969), 14th chief justice of Alaska (2003–2006), associate justice of the Alaska Supreme Court (1997–2003; 2006–2007)
- Walter L. Carpeneti (A.B. 1967), 16th chief justice of Alaska (2009–2012), associate justice of the Alaska Supreme Court (1998–2009; 2012–2013)
- Wallace P. Carson Jr. (A.B. 1956), 40th chief justice of the Oregon Supreme Court (1991–2005), associate justice of the Oregon Supreme Court (1982–1991; 2005–2006), Oregon State Senate minority leader (1975–1977), Oregon state senator (1971–1977), Oregon State House Majority Leader (1969–1970), Oregon State Representative (1967–1971)
- William P. Clark Jr. (A.B. 1953), associate justice of the California Supreme Court (1973–1981), U.S. deputy secretary of state (1981–1982), U.S. National Security advisor (1982–1983), 44th U.S. secretary of the interior
- Cathy Cochran (A.B. 1966), judge of the Texas Court of Criminal Appeals (2001–2015)
- Mariano-Florentino Cuéllar (Ph.D. 2000), associate justice of the California Supreme Court (2015–2021)
- Maurice T. Dooling Jr. (A.B. 1911, LL.B. 1913), associate justice of the California Supreme Court (1960–1962)
- Barbara Durham (LL.B. 1968), 1st Female chief justice of the Washington Supreme Court (1995–1998), associate justice of the Washington Supreme Court (1985–1995, 1998–1999)
- Kelli Evans (B.A. 1991), associate justice of the California Supreme Court (2023–present)
- Ronald M. George (LL.B. 1964), 27th chief justice of California (1996–2011), associate justice of the California Supreme Court (1991–1996)
- Joshua Groban (B.A. 1995), associate justice of the California Supreme Court (2019–present)
- Patricia Guerrero (J.D. 1997), 29th chief justice of California (2023–present), associate justice of the California Supreme Court (2022–2023)
- Charles E. Jones (LL.B. 1962), chief justice of the Arizona Supreme Court (2002–2005), associate justice of the Arizona Supreme Court (1996–2002)
- Robert G. Klein (A.B. 1969), associate justice of the Hawaii Supreme Court (1992–2000)
- Rebecca Love Kourlis (A.B. 1973, J.D. 1976), associate justice of the Colorado Supreme Court (1995–2006),
- Steven Levinson (A.B. 1968), associate justice of the Hawaii Supreme Court (1992–2008),
- Goodwin Liu (B.S. 1991), associate justice of the California Supreme Court (2011–present)
- Monica Márquez (A.B. 1991), associate justice of the Colorado Supreme Court (2010–present)
- Warren Matthews (A.B. 1961), 8th and 12th chief justice of Alaska (1987–1990, 1997–2000), associate justice of the Alaska Supreme Court (1977–1987, 1990–1997, 2000–2009)
- Marshall F. McComb (A.B. 1917), associate justice of the California Supreme Court (1956–1977)
- Ernest McFarland (A.M.1922, LL.B. 1924), chief justice of the Arizona Supreme Court (1968–1968), associate justice of the Arizona Supreme Court (1964–1968), 10th governor of Arizona (1955–1959), 8th United States Senate majority leader (1951–1953), United States senator (1941–1953)
- Charles L. McNary (A.B. 1897), associate justice of the Oregon Supreme Court (1913–1915), U.S. senator (1917–1944), United States Senate minority leader (1933–1944)
- Lee Metcalf (A.B. 1936), associate justice of the Montana Supreme Court (1947–1953), U.S. congressman (1953–1961), United States senator (1961–1978)
- Carlos R. Moreno (J.D. 1975), associate justice of the California Supreme Court (2001–2011), judge of the Central District of California (1998–2001), U.S. Ambassador to Belize (2014–2017)
- William A. Neumann (LL.B. 1968), associate justice of the North Dakota Supreme Court (1993–2005)
- Albert L. Rendlen, chief justice of the Missouri Supreme Court (1983–1985), associate justice of the Missouri Supreme Court (1977–1983; 1985–1992)
- Frank K. Richardson (A.B. 1935, LL.B. 1938), associate justice of the California Supreme Court (1974–1983)
- Chase T. Rogers (A.B. 1979), 37th chief justice of the Connecticut Supreme Court (2007–2018)
- Robert S. Smith (A.B. 1965), associate judge of the New York Court of Appeals (2004–2014)
- Homer R. Spence (A.B. 1913, LL.B. 1915), associate justice of the California Supreme Court (1945–1960)
- Jacob Tanzer, associate justice of the Oregon Supreme Court (1980–1982), judge of the Oregon Court of Appeals (1973–1975; 1976–1980)
- Gordon R. Thompson (LL.B. 1943), chief justice of the Supreme Court of Nevada (1966–1968, 1973–1974), associate justice of the Nevada Supreme Court (1961–1965, 1969–1972, 1975–1980)
- Donald Wright (A.B. 1929), 24th chief justice of California (1970–1977)

=== State courts of appeal ===
- Mary Kay Becker (A.B. 1966), judge of the Washington Court of Appeals, Division I (1994–2019)
- C. C. Bridgewater (A.B. 1966), judge of the Washington Court of Appeals, Division II (1994–2010)
- George A. Brown (LL.B. 1948), justice of the California Fifth District Court of Appeal (1972–1987); associate justice (1971–1972)
- Christopher Cottle (A.B. 1962), justice of the California Sixth District Court of Appeal (1993–2001); associate justice (1988–1993)
- Elena J. Duarte (J.D. 1992), associate justice of the California Third District Court of Appeal (2010–present)
- Gerold C. Dunn (A.B. 1934, LL.B. 1938), associate justice of the California Second District Court of Appeal, Division Four (1968–1977)
- Peter Eckerstrom (J.D. 1986), chief judge of the Arizona Court of Appeals, Division Two (2014–2019); judge of the Arizona Court of Appeals, Division Two (2003–2014; 2019–present)
- John Joseph Ford (A.B. 1928), residing justice of the California Second District Court of Appeal, Division Three (1966–1977), associate justice of the California Second District Court of Appeal, Division Three (1959–1966)
- Elizabeth A. Grimes (J.D. 1980), associate justice of the California Second District Court of Appeal, Division Eight (2010–present)
- Rick Haselton (A.B. 1976), chief judge of the Oregon Court of Appeals (2012–2015); judge of the Oregon Court of Appeals (1994–2012)
- Diane Johnsen (J.D. 1982), judge of the Arizona Court of Appeals, Division One (2006–2020)
- Daniel J. Kremer (A.B. 1960, LL.B. 1963), justice of the California Fourth District Court of Appeal, Division One (1985–2003)
- James A. McIntyre (LL.B. 1963), associate justice of the California Fourth District Court of Appeal, Division One (1996–2016)
- Richard M. Mosk (A.B. 1960), associate justice of the California Second District Court of Appeal, Division Five (2001–2016)
- Dennis M. Perluss (A.B. 1970), presiding justice of the California Second District Court of Appeal, Division Seven (2003–present), associate justice of the California Second District Court of Appeal, Division Seven (2001–2003)
- Fred R. Pierce (A.B. 1921), justice of the California Third District Court of Appeal (1962–1971); associate justice (1961–1962)
- Stuart R. Pollak (A.B. 1959), justice of the California First District Court of Appeal, Division Four (2018–present); associate justice of the First District, Division Three (2002–2018)
- William A. Reppy (A.B. 1934), associate justice of the California Second District Court of Appeal, Division Five (1968–1972)
- Richard M. Sims Jr. (A.B. 1931), associate justice of the California First District Court of Appeal, Division One (1964–1978)
- William A. Thorne Jr. (J.D. 1977), judge of the Utah Court of Appeals (2000–2013)
- Robert Y. Thornton (A.B. 1932), judge of the Oregon Court of Appeals (1971–1983)
- Kathryn Doi Todd (A.B. 1963), associate justice of the California Second District Court of Appeal, Division Two (2001–2013), First female Asian American judge in the history of the United States (1978)
- Walton J. Wood (A.B. 1901), associate justice of the California Second District Court of Appeal, Division Two (1935–1945), first public defender in the history of the United States (1914–1921)

=== Non-U.S. courts ===
- Sian Elias (J.S.M. 1972), first female and 12th chief justice of New Zealand (1999–2019)

== Law ==
=== Attorneys ===
- Luke Cole (A.B. 1984), environmental lawyer, co-founder of the Center on Race, Poverty and the Environment
- Casey Gwinn, San Diego city attorney (1996–2004)
- William Kaplan (J.S.D. 1988), lawyer, arbitrator, law professor, and author
- Kalpana Kotagal (A.B. 1999, B.S. 1999), employment attorney and U.S. Equal Employment Opportunity Commissioner
- Caroline D. Krass (A.B. 1989), general counsel of the Department of Defense
- Cheryl Mills (J.D. 1990), 29th counselor of the U.S. State Department, 2009–2013
- Michael Nava (J.D. 1981), lawyer and advocate of the need to open the legal profession to traditionally underrepresented groups
- Neil Papiano (A.B. 1956, A.M. 1957), attorney for President Ronald Reagan, Elizabeth Taylor, and Walter Matthau
- Anthony Romero (J.D. 1990), first openly gay man and first Latino director of the American Civil Liberties Union
- J. Tony Serra (A.B. 1957), radical civil rights attorney

=== Attorneys general ===
- Xavier Becerra (A.B. 1980, J.D. 1984), 33rd California attorney general, 25th U.S. secretary of health and human services, U.S. congressman (1993–2017)
- Josh Hawley (B.A. 2002), 42nd Missouri attorney general; U.S. senator
- Robert Y. Thornton (A.B. 1932), 8th Oregon attorney general
- John Van de Kamp (LL.B. 1959), 28th attorney general of California, 37th Los Angeles County district attorney

=== District attorneys ===
- Nathan Hochman (J.D. 1988), 44th Los Angeles County district attorney, United States assistant attorney general for the Tax Division (2008–2009)
- Larry Krasner (J.D. 1987), 26th district attorney of Philadelphia
- John Van de Kamp (LL.B. 1959), 37th Los Angeles County district attorney, 28th attorney general of California

=== U.S. attorneys ===
- David L. Anderson (J.D. 1990), United States attorney for the Northern District of California (2019–2021)
- Donald B. Ayer (A.B. 1971), 24th United States deputy attorney general (1989–1990)
- Nathan Hochman (J.D. 1988), United States assistant attorney general for the Tax Division (2008–2009), 44th Los Angeles County district attorney (2024–present)
- Carol Lam (J.D. 1985), United States attorney for the Southern District of California (2002–2007)
- Ronald Machen (A.B. 1991), United States attorney for the District of Columbia (2010–2015)
- Jeffrey A. Taylor (A.B. 1987), interim United States attorney for the District of Columbia (2006–2009)

== Literature and journalism ==
=== Journalism ===
- Gary Allen, journalist and author
- Ryan Blitstein, journalist
- Rajiv Chandrasekaran, Washington Post editor and author
- Bob Cohn, journalist
- Alice Rogers Hager (1894–1969), journalist; president, Women's National Press Club
- Aljean Harmetz, journalist and film historian
- Sally Jenkins, author and sports journalist
- Ted Koppel (A.M.), journalist
- Doyle McManus, Los Angeles Times bureau chief in Washington, D.C., author, and broadcast commentator
- Sharmeen Obaid-Chinay, journalist
- Daniel Pearl, journalist
- Gary Shilling, financial analyst and commentator with Forbes, The New York Times, and The Wall Street Journal
- Joel Stein, columnist for the Los Angeles Times
- Nicholas Thompson, editor in chief of Wired and historian

=== Writers ===
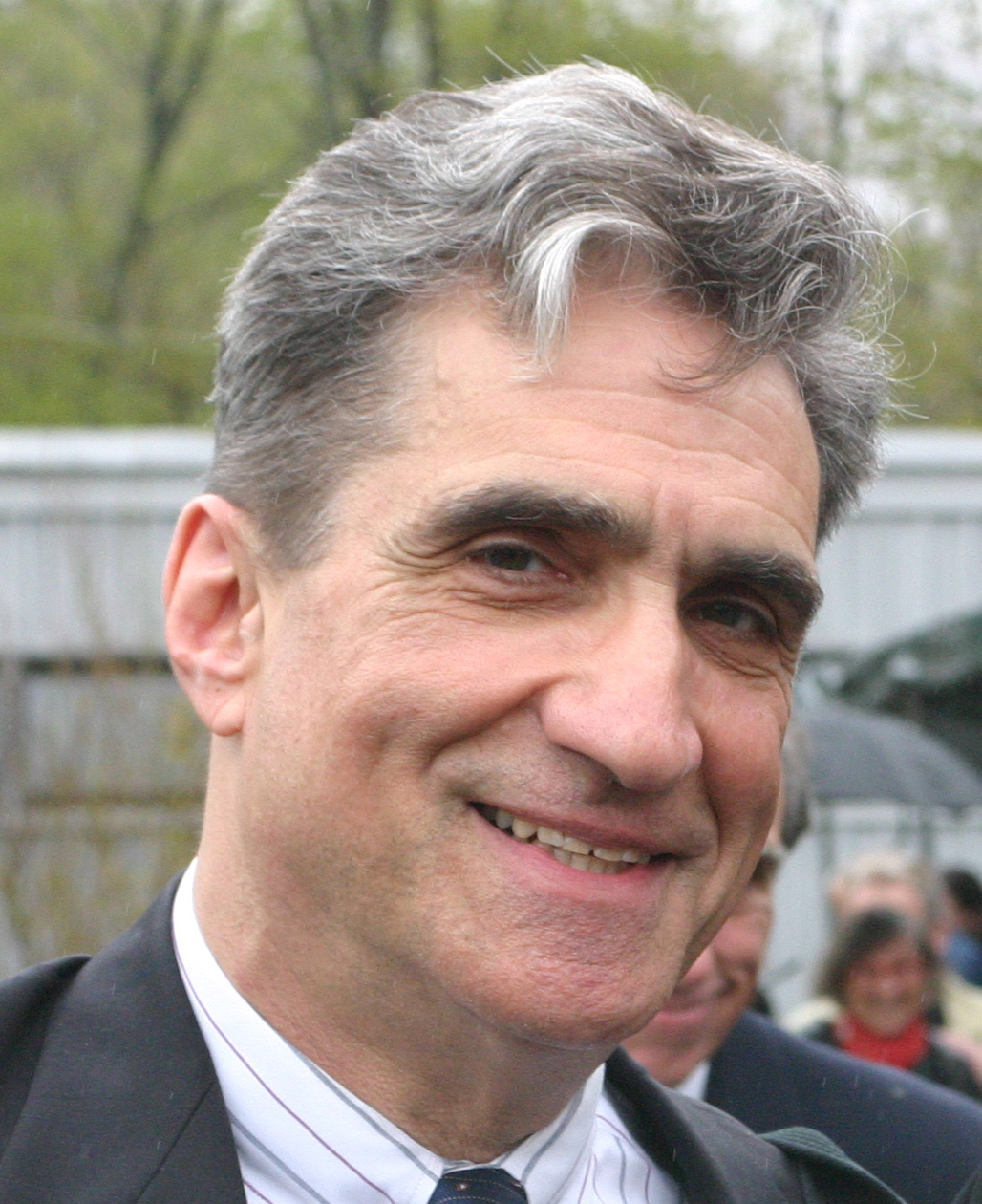
Robert Pinsky

- Ann Bannon (Ph.D. linguistics), pulp fiction author
- Elif Batuman (Ph.D. comparative literature), author of The Idiot and The Possessed
- Brit Bennett (A.B. 2012), author
- Stewart Brand, writer and editor
- H. W. Brands (A.B. 1975), author and historian
- Ethan Canin (A.B. 1982), author
- Thad Carhart, author
- Victoria Chang (M.B.A), poet and writer
- Victor Cheng (A.B, A.M.), author and blogger
- Erskine Childers, author and United Nations official
- Michael Cunningham, author
- Simin Daneshvar (Ph.D.), novelist and story writer
- Ram Dass (Ph.D. 1957), author and spiritual teacher
- Allen Drury (A.B. 1939), Pulitzer Prize-winning author
- Selden Edwards (A.M. education), best-selling novelist
- Stephen Fender (B.A.), writer
- Carlos Fonseca Suárez (B.A. comparative literature), novelist
- Allegra Goodman (Ph.D. English literature), novelist
- Robin Lee Graham, co-wrote Dove about sailing the world alone as a teenager
- Alexander Greendale (M.A.), playwright
- Yaa Gyasi (A.B. English), novelist
- Sam Harris (A.B. 2000), author
- Robert Hass (A.M., Ph.D.), U.S. Poet Laureate
- George V. Higgins (A.M.), crime novelist
- Douglas Hofstadter, Pulitzer Prize winner and author
- David Henry Hwang (1979), playwright
- Arturo Islas (A.B. 1960, A.M. 1965, Ph.D. 1971), fiction writer
- Fenton Johnson (A.B., 1975), author of fiction and nonfiction
- Ken Kesey (A.M.), author
- Iris Krasnow (A.B. 1976), author specializing in relationships and personal growth
- Alan Lelchuk (M.A. 1962, Ph.D. 1965), writer and professor at Dartmouth College
- Eugene Lim, novelist and recipient of the Dos Passos Prize
- William Harjo LoneFight, Native American author and expert in the revitalization of Native American languages and cultural traditions
- Dhan Gopal Mukerji, novelist and winner of the Newbery Medal
- Siddhartha Mukherjee (B.S. 1993), author, scientist and Pulitzer Prize winner
- Ted Nace (A.B. 1978), author noted for the critique of corporate personhood
- Scott O'Dell, author
- Robert Pinsky (Ph.D.), U.S. Poet Laureate
- Chip Rawlins, non-fiction author
- Richard Rodriguez (A.B.), author
- Edward Rutherfurd, novelist
- Vikram Seth (non-degreed), poet and author
- Curtis Sittenfeld, author
- Anthony Veasna So (B.A. 2014), short story writer
- John Steinbeck (non-degreed), winner of the Nobel Prize in Literature
- Gene Stone (A.B. 1973), author
- Hans Otto Storm, novelist
- Mark Sundeen, novelist and magazine writer
- Tony Tulathimutte, fiction writer
- Scott Turow (A.M.), author
- Alok Vaid-Menon, poet
- Brian Wansink (Ph.D. 1990), author of Mindless Eating: Why We Eat More Than We Think
- Jesmyn Ward (B.A., M.A.), author
- Edith Wherry (1901), author
- Mona Williams (B.A.), children's author, memoirist, oral storyteller, and writing teacher
- Albert Wilson (M.S.), author, botanist, and landscape architect
- Tanaya Winder, poet
- Tobias Wolff (A.M.), short story and memoir writer, professor at Stanford University
- John Zerzan (A.B., 1965), nonfiction author and primitivist
- Richard Zimler (A.M. 1982), author

== Medicine ==
- James B. Aguayo-Martel (M.D. 1981, M.P.H. 1981), physician, surgeon, and inventor of NMR microscopy and deuterium NMR spectroscopy
- Jeremy M. Berg (B.S. 1980), director of the National Institute of General Medical Sciences
- David Benaron (postdoc), former professor in pediatrics and neonatology, digital health entrepreneur, specialist in medical imaging, monitoring and analysis, and co-inventor of "glowing mice" imaging technique
- T. Brian Callister (A.B. 1983), physician and health care policy expert
- Francine Coeytaux, founder of the Pacific Institute for Women's Health
- Kenneth L. Davis, president and chief executive officer of Mount Sinai Medical Center
- Katherine A. Flores (B.S. 1975), professor at UCSF School of Medicine and founder of a program to recruit and train LatinX doctors
- David A. Karnofsky (A.M. 1936, M.D. 1940), medical oncologist known for the Karnofsky score
- Stephen LaBerge (Ph.D. 1980), psychophysiologist specializing in the scientific study of lucid dreaming
- Reed M. Nesbit (A.B. 1921, M.D. 1924), urologist and pioneer of transurethral resection of the prostate
- Oliver Press, cancer researcher and physician
- Marcia Stefanick (Ph.D. 1982), director of the Stanford Women's Health and Sex Differences in Medicine Center
- Nicholas Tatonetti (Ph.D. 2012), bioscientist, vice chair of operations in the Department of Computational Biomedicine and associate director of computational oncology in the Cancer Center at Cedars-Sinai Medical Center

== Military ==
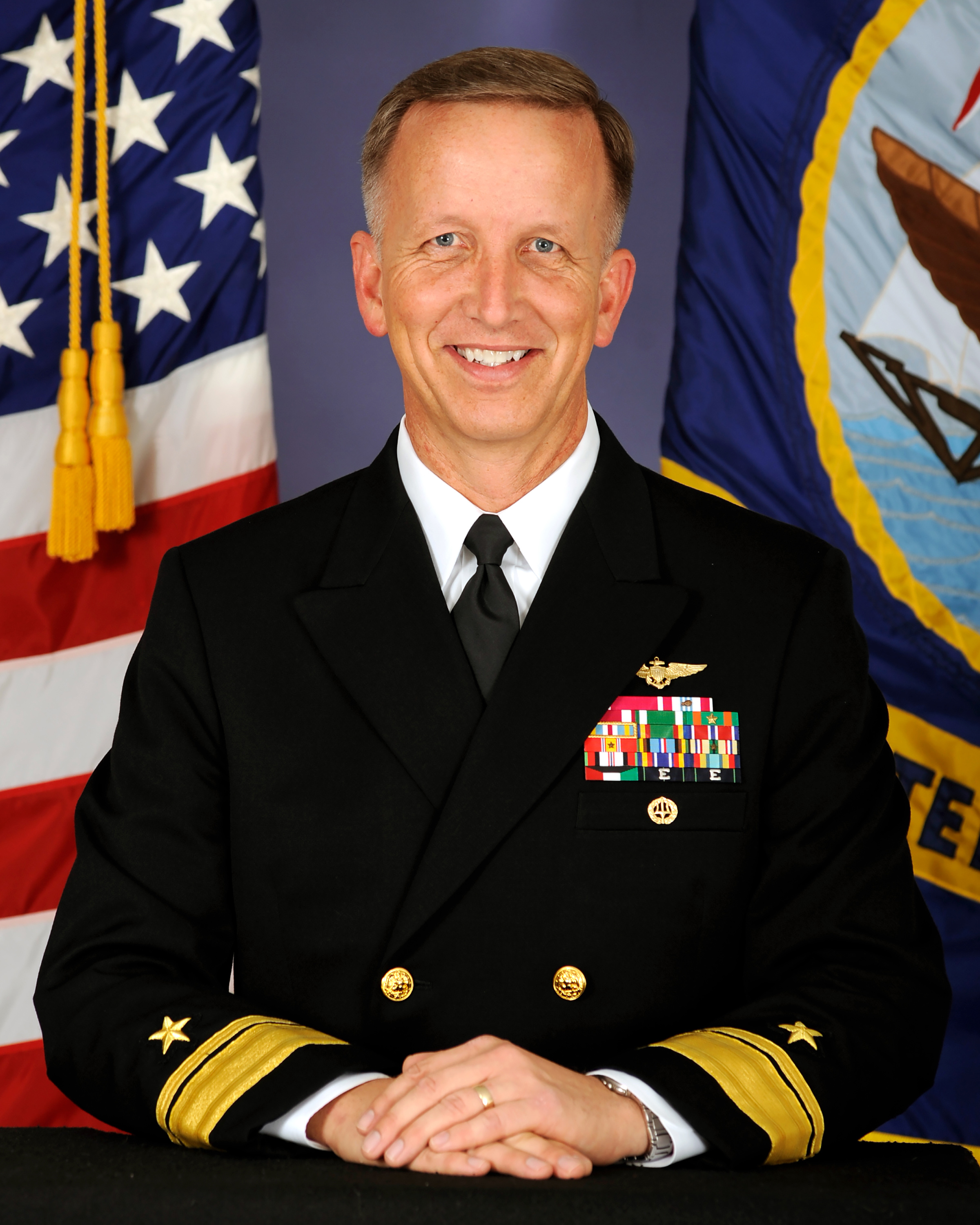
Paul Sohl

- Scott D. Anderson (1987), Air National Guard F-16 pilot and general aviation test pilot
- Jeff Cooper, United States Marine Corps veteran of World War II and Korean War, considered the creator of the "modern technique" of handgun shooting
- William J. Crowe (M.Ed. 1956), 11th Chairman of the Joint Chiefs of Staff, 60th United States Ambassador to the United Kingdom
- Cai Dexian, Singaporean Army chief and first Singaporean to receive the Bronze Star Medal
- Clifford B. Drake (A.M. 1951), Marine Corps major general
- Karl Eikenberry (A.M. 1994), lieutenant general in the U.S. Army, commander of Combined Forces Command Afghanistan (2002–2003, 2005–2009), later U.S. ambassador to Afghanistan (2009–2011)
- William G. Joslyn (B.A. 1943), major general in the Marine Corps
- John A. Macready (1912), aviator; the only three-time winner of the Mackay Trophy
- Charles A. Ott, Jr. (1941), United States Army major general and director of the Army National Guard
- Paul Sohl, United States Navy rear admiral
- Derek Tournear, Director of the Space Development Agency

== Miscellaneous ==
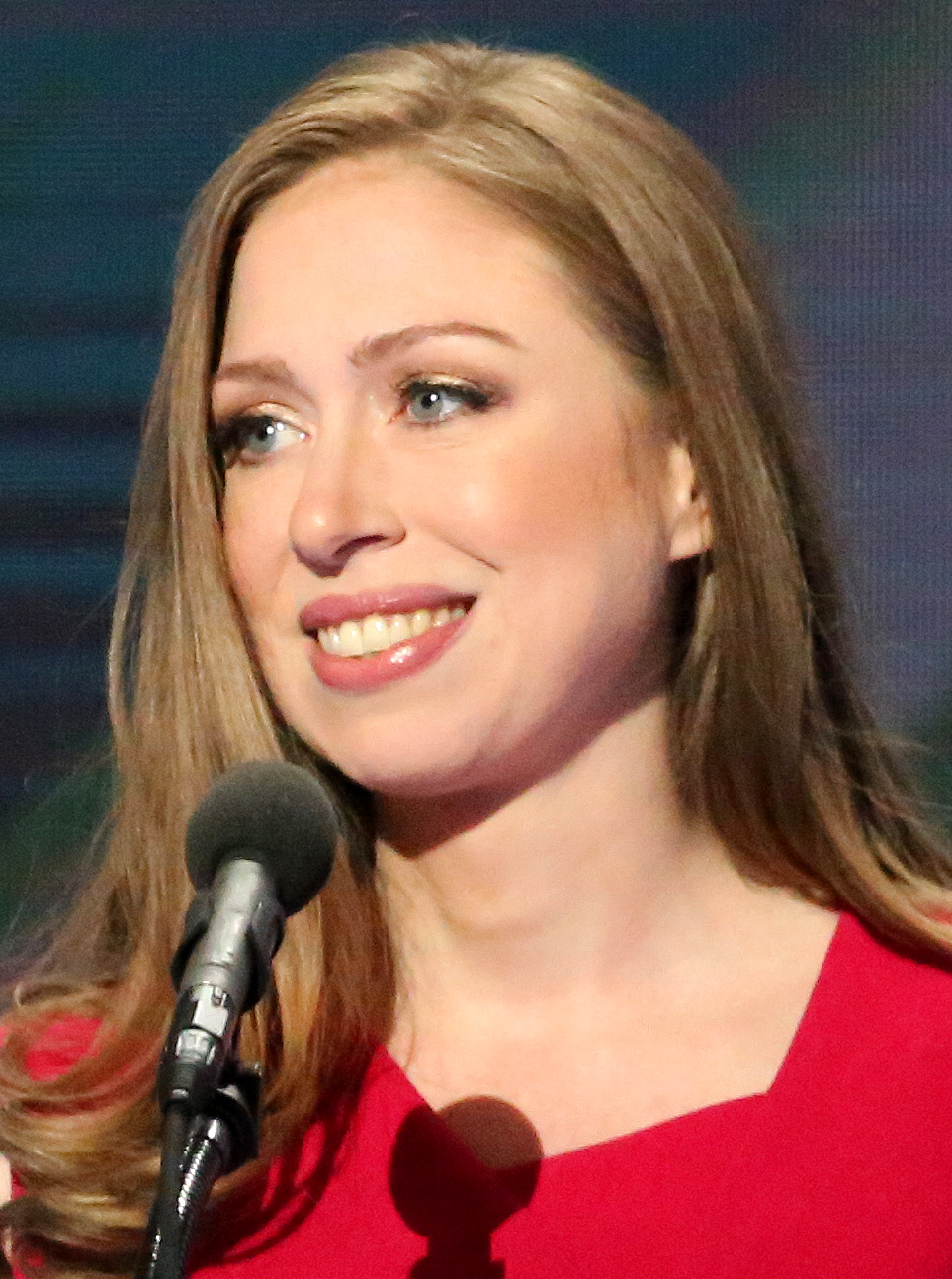
Chelsea Clinton

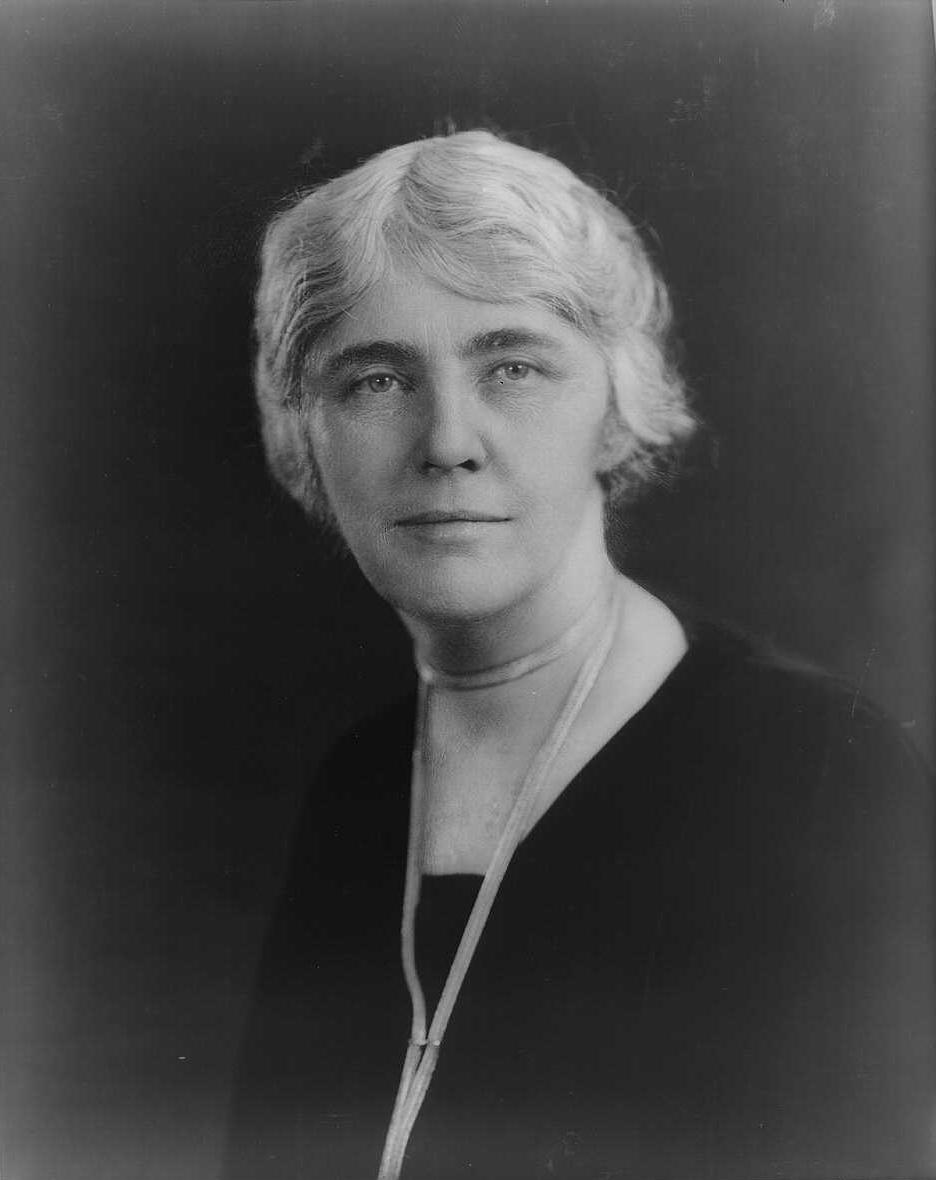
Lou Henry Hoover

- Auburn Calloway, attempted hijacker
- Chelsea Clinton (A.B. 2001), First Daughter of the United States
- Paul Draper, winemaker at Ridge Vineyards
- Lou Henry Hoover, First Lady of the United States
- Ann O'Leary (A.M. 1997), senior policy advisor, Hillary Clinton presidential campaign, 2016; chief of staff to California Governor Gavin Newsom
- Theodore Streleski, murderer of Stanford professor Karel deLeeuw in 1978
- Gayle Wilson (A.B. 1964), First Lady of California

== Politics ==
=== Presidents, vice presidents, and prime ministers ===
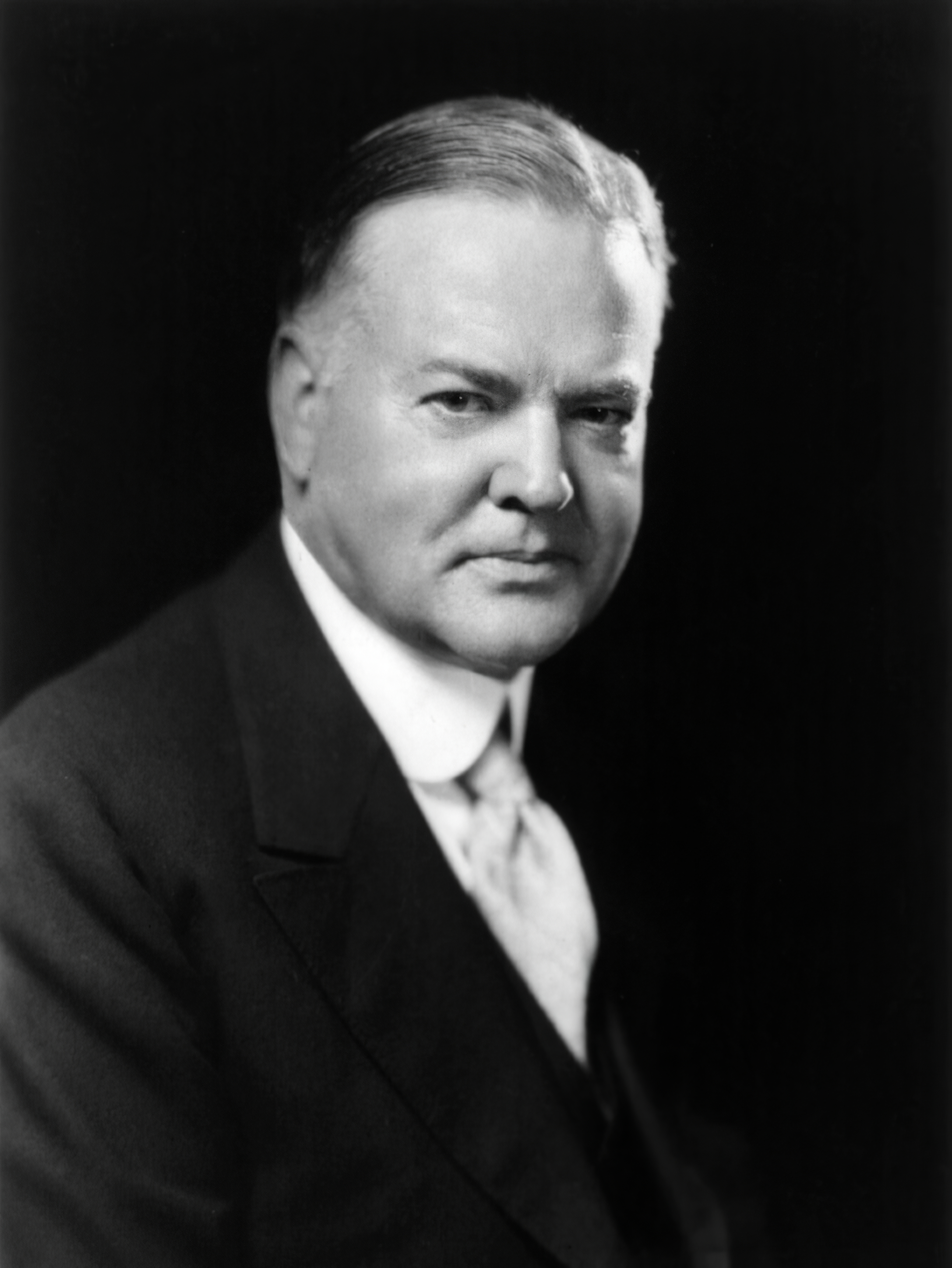
Herbert Hoover

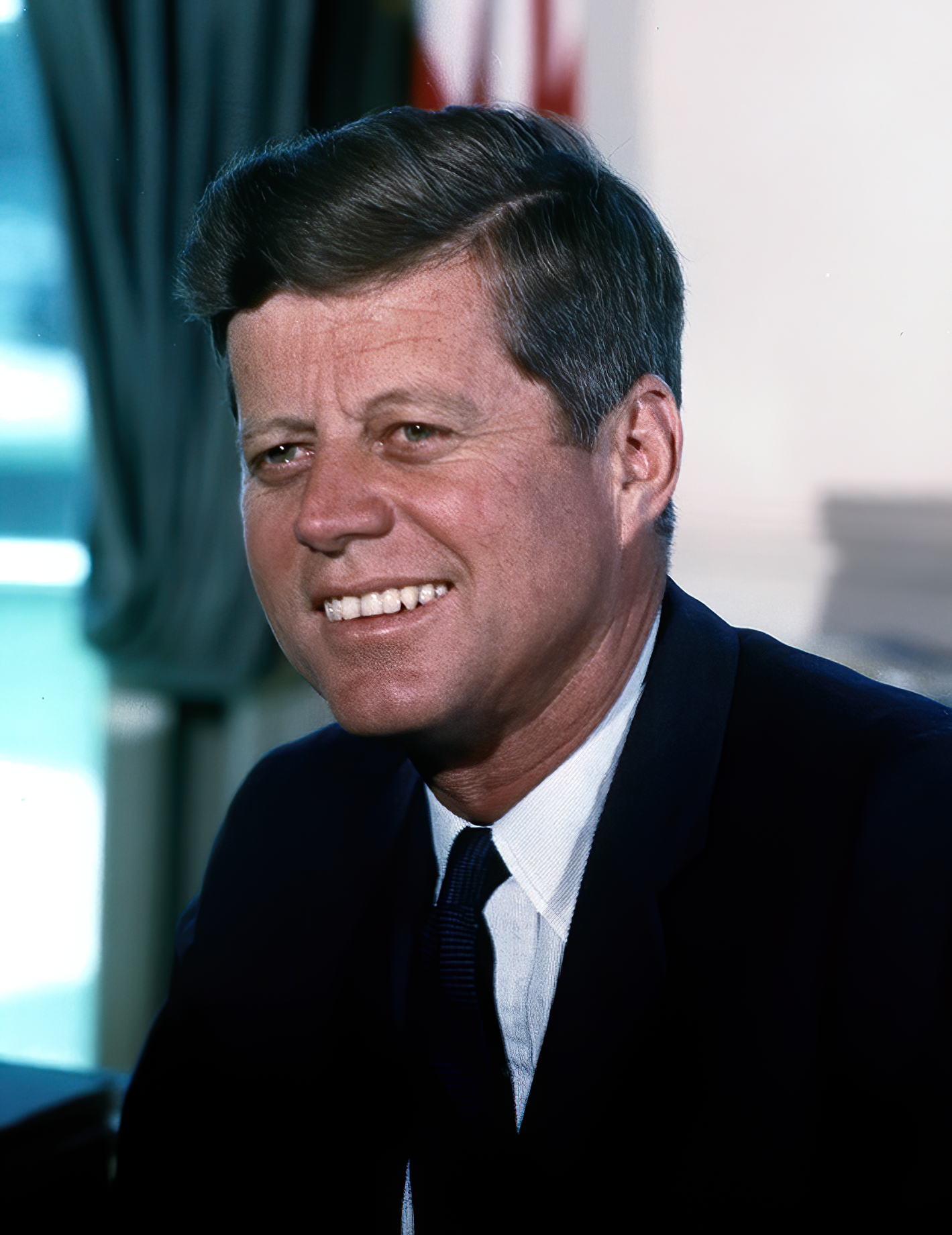
John F. Kennedy

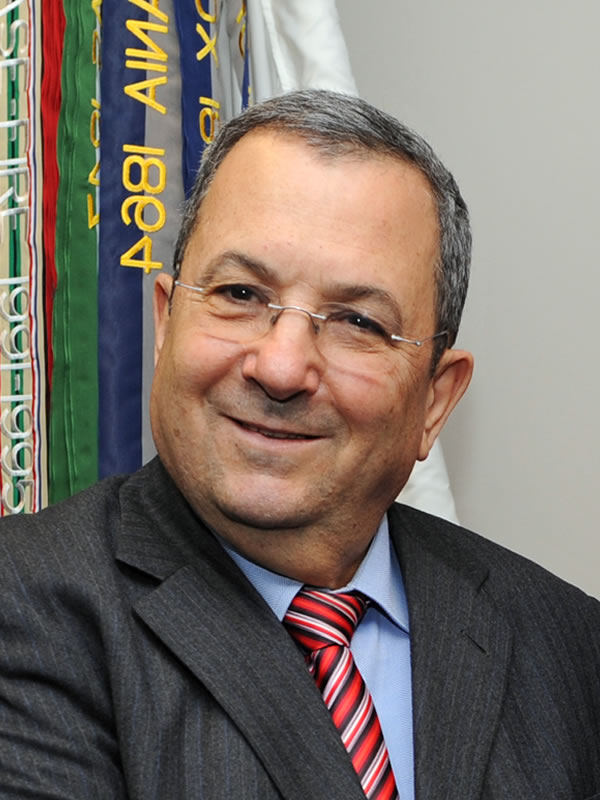
Ehud Barak

Yukio Hatoyama

- Mohammad Reza Aref (M.S. 1976, Ph.D. 1980), 2nd and 8th first vice president of Iran
- Taro Aso (graduate student 1963–1965), 59th prime minister of Japan
- Ehud Barak (M.S. 1979), 10th prime minister of Israel
- Chang San-cheng (MASc 1977), 27th premier of Taiwan
- Yukio Hatoyama (Ph.D. 1976), 60th prime minister of Japan
- Herbert Hoover (A.B. 1895), 31st president of the United States
- John F. Kennedy (M.B.A, dropped out), 35th president of the United States
- Ricardo Maduro (A.B. 1967), 28th president of Honduras
- John Atta Mills (J.D. 1971), 3rd president of Ghana
- Kyriakos Mitsotakis (A.M. 1993), prime minister of Greece (2019–present),
- Jorge Serrano Elías (A.M. 1973), 29th president of Guatemala
- Rishi Sunak (M.B.A. 2006), prime minister of the United Kingdom (2022–2024)
- Alejandro Toledo (A.M. 1972, A.M. 1974, Ph.D. 1993), 92nd president of Peru
- Mohamed Waheed Hassan (M.A. 1982, M.A. 1985, Ph.D. 1987), 5th president of Maldives

=== Royalty ===
- Alfred Achebe (B.S. 1966), 21st obi of Onitsha, Nigeria
- Kesang Choden Wangchuck (B.A. 2004), princess of Bhutan
- Prince Moulay Hicham of Morocco (M.A. 1997), prince of Morocco
- Philippe of Belgium (A.M. 1985), 7th king of the Belgians
- Sonam Dechen Wangchuck (B.A. 2003), princess of Bhutan
- Prince William of Gloucester (post-baccalaureate 1964), British prince, grandson of George V

=== Cabinet secretaries and ministers ===
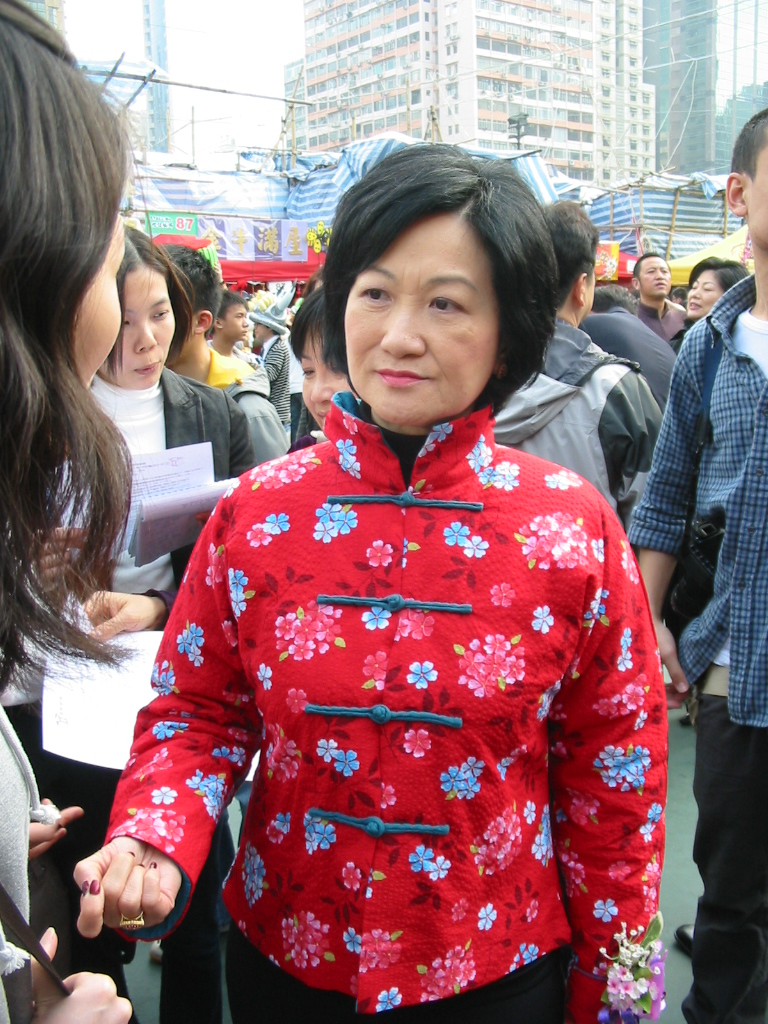
Regina Ip

- Xavier Becerra (A.B. 1980, J.D. 1984), 25th U.S. secretary of health and human services, 33rd California attorney general, U.S. congressman (1993–2017)
- Avishay Braverman (Ph.D. 1976), Israeli Minister of Minorities (2009–2011)
- John Bryson (A.B. 1965), 37th U.S. secretary of commerce
- Julian Castro (B.A. 1996), 16th U.S. secretary of housing and urban development
- Warren Christopher (LL.B. 1949), 63rd U.S. secretary of state
- William P. Clark, Jr. (A.B. 1953), 44th U.S. secretary of the interior, U.S. National Security advisor (1982–1983), U.S. deputy secretary of state (1981–1982), associate justice of the California Supreme Court (1973–1981)
- William Denman Eberle (A.B. 1945), 4th U.S. Trade Representative, 1971–1975
- John S. Herrington (A.B. 1961), 5th U.S. secretary of energy
- Shirley Hufstedler (LL.B. 1949), 1st U.S. secretary of education (1979–1981), judge of the Ninth Circuit Court of Appeals (1968–1979), associate justice of the California Court of Appeal (1966–1968)
- Regina Ip (M.S. 1987, M.A. 2006), secretary for security of Hong Kong (1998–2003)
- Sally Kosgei (A.M. 1975, Ph.D. 1980), Kenyan Minister of Agriculture (2010–2013), Kenyan Minister for Higher Education (2008–2010)
- William J. Perry (B.S. 1949, M.S. 1950), 19th U.S. secretary of defense
- Penny Pritzker (M.B.A. 1984, J.D. 1984), 38th United States secretary of commerce
- Susan Schwab (A.M. 1977), 15th U.S. Trade Representative, 2006–2009
- Jyotiraditya Scindia (M.B.A. 2001), 37th Indian Minister of Steel (2022–present), 39th Indian Minister of Civil Aviation (2021–present), 29th Indian Minister of Power (2012–2014)
- Julie Su (A.B. 1991), acting U.S. secretary of labor (2023–2025)
- R. James Woolsey, Jr. (A.B. 1963), 16th U.S. Director of Central Intelligence

=== U.S. senators ===
- Max Baucus (A.B. 1964, LL.B. 1967), U.S. senator
- Jeff Bingaman (LL.B. 1968), U.S. senator
- Cory Booker (A.B. 1991, A.M. 1992), U.S. senator
- Frank Church (A.B. 1947, LL.B. 1950), U.S. senator
- Kent Conrad (A.B. 1971), U.S. senator
- Alan Cranston (A.B. 1936), U.S. senator
- Paul Fannin (A.B. 1930), U.S. senator; 11th governor of Arizona
- Dianne Feinstein (A.B. 1955), U.S. senator; 38th mayor of San Francisco
- Mark Hatfield (A.M. 1948), U.S. senator, 29th governor of Oregon
- Josh Hawley (B.A. 2002), U.S. senator, 42nd Missouri attorney general
- Carl Hayden (A.B. 1900), U.S. senator; president pro tempore of the United States Senate
- Charles B. Henderson (A.B. 1893), U.S. senator
- Henry M. Jackson (A.B. 1936), U.S. senator
- Ernest McFarland (A.M. 1922, LL.B. 1924), U.S. senator, 8th United States Senate majority leader, 10th governor of Arizona
- Charles L. McNary (A.B. 1897), U.S. senator, 3rd U.S. Senate minority leader, associate justice of the Oregon Supreme Court
- Jeff Merkley (A.B. 1979), U.S. senator
- Lee Metcalf (A.B. 1936), U.S. senator; U.S. congressman, associate justice of the Montana Supreme Court
- Mitt Romney (attended), U.S. senator, 70th governor of Massachusetts, 2012 U.S. presidential nominee
- Adam Schiff (A.B. 1982), U.S. senator; U.S. congressman
- Tina Smith (A.B. 1980), U.S. senator, 48th lieutenant governor of Minnesota
- Thomas M. Storke (A.B. 1898), U.S. senator
- Tim Wirth (Ph.D. 1973), U.S. senator
- Ron Wyden (A.B. 1971), U.S. senator

=== U.S. House of Representatives ===
- Robert Badham (A.B. 1951), United States House of Representatives
- Xavier Becerra (A.B. 1980, J.D. 1984), United States House of Representatives, 25th U.S. secretary of health and human services; 33rd attorney general of California
- Judy Biggert (A.B. 1959), United States House of Representatives
- Ernest K. Bramblett (A.B. 1925), United States House of Representatives,
- Hamer H. Budge (A.B. 1933), United States House of Representatives,
- Joaquin Castro (A.B. 1996), United States House of Representatives
- Cal Dooley (A.M. 1987), United States House of Representatives
- Jennifer Dunn (A.B. 1963), United States House of Representatives
- Don Edwards (A.B. 1936, LL.B. 1939), United States House of Representatives
- Eric Fingerhut (J.D. 1984), United States House of Representatives
- Arthur M. Free (A.B. 1901, LL.B. 1903), United States House of Representatives
- Anthony Gonzalez (M.B.A. 2014), United States House of Representatives, football player
- Daniel Hamburg (A.B. 1970), United States House of Representatives
- Josh Harder (B.A. 2008), United States House of Representatives
- Peter Hoagland (A.B. 1963), United States House of Representatives
- Steve Horn (A.B. 1953, Ph.D. 1958), United States House of Representatives
- Chrissy Houlahan (B.S. 1989), United States House of Representatives
- Michael Huffington (A.B. 1970, B.S. 1970), United States House of Representatives
- Mondaire Jones (B.A. 2009), United States House of Representatives
- Joseph P. Kennedy III (B.S. 2003), United States House of Representatives
- Jim Kolbe (M.B.A. 1967), United States House of Representatives
- Clarence F. Lea (A.B. 1897), United States House of Representatives
- Mike Levin (B.A. 2001), United States House of Representatives
- Ted Lieu (A.B. 1991, B.S. 1991), United States House of Representatives
- Dan Lipinski (M.S. 1989), United States House of Representatives
- James F. Lloyd (A.B. 1958), United States House of Representatives
- Zoe Lofgren (A.B. 1970), United States House of Representatives
- Bob Mathias (A.B. 1953), United States House of Representatives, two-time Olympic gold medalist
- Pete McCloskey (A.B. 1950, LL.B. 1953), United States House of Representatives
- Lee Metcalf (A.B. 1936), United States House of Representatives, United States senator, associate justice of the Montana Supreme Court
- Will Rogers, Jr. (A.B. 1935), United States House of Representatives
- Adam Schiff (A.B. 1982), United States House of Representatives, United States senator
- Jim Sensenbrenner (A.B. 1965), United States House of Representatives
- Burt L. Talcott (A.B. 1942, LL.B. 1948), United States House of Representatives
- Charles M. Teague (A.B. 1931, LL.B. 1934), United States House of Representatives
- William I. Traeger (A.B. 1901), United States House of Representatives, Sseriff of Los Angeles County, USC Trojans football head coach
- Victor Veysey (Ph.D. 1942), United States House of Representatives
- Doug Walgren (LL.B. 1966), United States House of Representatives
- David Wu (B.S. 1977), United States House of Representatives
- Ed Zschau (M.B.A. 1963, M.S. 1964, Ph.D. 1967), United States House of Representatives

=== Governors ===
- Doug Burgum (M.B.A 1980), 33rd governor of North Dakota
- Gray Davis (A.B. 1964), 37th governor of California
- Jim Doyle (non-degreed), 44th governor of Wisconsin
- John V. Evans (A.B. 1951), 27th governor of Idaho
- Paul Fannin (A.B. 1930), 11th governor of Arizona and United States senator
- Mark Hatfield (A.M. 1948), 29th governor of Oregon and United States senator
- Goodwin Knight (A.B. 1919), 31st governor of California
- Scott M. Matheson (LL.B. 1952), governor of Utah
- Ernest McFarland (A.M. 1922, LL.B. 1924), 10th governor of Arizona and 8th United States Senate majority leader
- Dixy Lee Ray (Ph.D. 1945), 17th (and first female) governor of Washington
- Mitt Romney (attended), 70th governor of Massachusetts, 2012 U.S. presidential nominee, and United States senator
- Olene Walker (A.M. 1954), 15th (and first female) governor of Utah
- Hidehiko Yuzaki (M.B.A. 1995), governor of Hiroshima Prefecture

=== Lieutenant governors ===
- Doug Chin (A.B. 1988), 13th lieutenant governor of Hawaii
- Bill Halter (A.B. 1983), 14th lieutenant governor of Arkansas
- Brian Krolicki (A.B. 1983), 33rd lieutenant governor of Nevada
- Loren Leman (A.M. 1973), 10th lieutenant governor of Alaska
- Gail Schoettler (A.B. 1965), 44th lieutenant governor of Colorado

=== State legislators ===
- Tom Adelson (A.B. 1988), former Oklahoma state senator
- Juan Arambula (A.M. 1978), former California State Assembly member
- Josh Becker (J.D. 1998, M.B.A. 1998), California state senator
- Mary Kay Becker (A.B. 1966), former Washington state representative
- Andy Berke (A.B. 1990), mayor of Chattanooga, Tennessee and former Tennessee state senator
- Albert E. Bradbury, former Wyoming House of Representatives
- Julie Bunn (A.M. 1985, Ph.D. 1993), former Minnesota House of Representatives
- Brian Bushweller (A.M. 1970), Delaware Senate
- Capri Cafaro (A.B. 1996), former Ohio Senate minority leader
- Wilma Chan (A.M. 1994), former California State Assembly majority leader
- Charles Coiner (A.B. 1965), former Idaho Senate
- William A. Collins (M.B.A. 1959), former Connecticut House of Representatives and mayor of Norwalk, Connecticut
- Eric Croft (B.S. 1986), former Alaska House of Representatives
- Richard J. Dolwig (LL.M. 1938), former California state Ssnator
- Andy Fleischmann (A.M. 1989), Connecticut House of Representatives
- Mary Alice Ford (A.B. 1956), former Oregon House of Representatives
- Nolan Frizzelle, former California State Assembly
- Lorena Gonzalez (A.B. 1993), California State Assembly
- Gary K. Hart (A.B. 1965), former California state senator
- Jon Hecht (A.B. 1981), Massachusetts House of Representatives
- Barry Keene (A.B. 1962, LL.B. 1964), former California state senator
- Beth Kerttula (A.B. 1978), former Alaska House of Representatives minority leader
- Patricia Lantz (A.B. 1960), former Washington House of Representatives
- Stephen R. Leopold (A.B. 1966), former Wisconsin State Assembly
- Sally J. Lieber (A.B. 2000), former California State Assembly
- Michael Machado (A.B. 1970), former California state senator
- Milton Marks (A.B. 1941), former California state senator
- George W. Milias (A.M. 1950), former California State Assembly
- Becky Morgan (M.B.A. 1978), former California state senator
- Robert W. Naylor (A.B. 1966), former California State Assembly minority leader
- Nicholas C. Petris (LL.B. 1949), former California state senator
- Curren Price (A.B. 1972), California state senator and Los Angeles City Council
- Albert S. Rodda (A.B. 1933, Ph.D. 1951), former California state senator
- Ira Ruskin (A.M. 1983), former California State Assembly
- Brandon Shaffer (A.B. 1993), former president of the Colorado Senate
- Alan Sieroty (A.B. 1952), former California state senator
- Joe Simitian (A.M. 2000), former California state senator
- Robert S. Stevens (A.B. 1939, LL.B. 1942), former California state senator
- William A. Sutherland (A.B. 1895, LL.B. 1898), former California State Assembly
- Cynthia Thielen, Hawaii House of Representatives
- Peter Wirth (A.B. 1984), New Mexico Senate majority leader

=== Other U.S. federal and state officials ===
- Christine Abizaid (M.A. 2010), 7th director of the U.S. National Counterterrorism Center (2021–present)
- Jaime Areizaga-Soto (A.M. 1994, J.D. 1994), 11th U.S. chairman of the Board of Veterans' Appeals (2022–present)
- Raphael Bostic (Ph.D. 1995), 15th president of the Federal Reserve Bank of Atlanta (2017–2026)
- Steven G. Bradbury (B.A. 1980), 14th U.S. deputy secretary of transportation (2025–present)
- Gabe Camarillo (J.D. 2002), 35th U.S. under secretary of the Army (2022–present)
- Lawrence Clayton (A.B. 1914), member of the Federal Reserve Board of Governors (1947–1949)
- Kurt DelBene (M.S. 1983), U.S. assistant secretary of Veterans Affairs for Information and Technology and chief information officer
- Stacey Dixon (B.S. 1993), 6th U.S. principal deputy director of National Intelligence (2021–present)
- Richard W. Fisher (M.B.A. 1975), 12th president of the Federal Reserve Bank of Dallas (2005–2015)
- Glen Fukushima (A.B. 1972), deputy assistant United States Trade Representative (1988–1990)
- Beth M. Hammack (A.B. 1993), 12th president of the Federal Reserve Bank of Cleveland (2024–present)
- Keith Hennessey (B.A.S. 1990), 7th director of the U.S. National Economic Council (2007–2009)
- Valerie Jarrett (A.B. 1978), senior advisor to U.S. President Barack Obama (2009–2017)
- Kristina M. Johnson (B.S. 1979, M.S. 1981, Ph.D. 1984), U.S. undersecretary of energy (2009–2010), 16th president of Ohio State University (2020–present) and provost of Johns Hopkins University (2007–2009)
- Dennis P. Lockhart (A.B. 1968), 14th president of the Federal Reserve Bank of Atlanta (2007–2017)
- Kathleen Matthews (A.B. 1975), chair of the Maryland Democratic Party (2017–2018)
- Gautam Raghavan (B.A. 2004), director of the White House Presidential Personnel Office (2022–present)
- Catherine Sandoval (J.D. 1990), California Public Utilities commissioner (2011–2017)
- Vice Admiral James Stockdale (A.M. 1962), independent U.S. vice presidential candidate in the 1992 presidential election with Ross Perot and the highest-ranking naval officer held as a prisoner of war in Vietnam
- Tony Tether (M.S. 1965, Ph.D. 1969), former director of the Defense Advanced Research Projects Agency (DARPA)
- Kevin Warsh (A.B. 1992), 17th chair of the Federal Reserve (2026–present), member of the Federal Reserve Board of Governors (2006–2011)
- Jared Weinstein (M.B.A. 2011), special assistant and personal aide to U.S. President George W. Bush (2006–2009)
- John C. Williams (Ph.D. 1994), 11th president of the Federal Reserve Bank of New York (2018–present), 12th president of the Federal Reserve Bank of San Francisco (2011–2018)
- Pete Williams (A.B. 1974), NBC reporter, U.S. assistant secretary of defense for public affairs (1989–1993)

=== Local officials ===
- Chelsea Cook, city councillor for Durham, North Carolina
- Matt Gonzalez (J.D. 1990), president of the San Francisco Board of Supervisors (2003–2005)
- Wilder W. Hartley, Los Angeles city councilman (1939–1941)
- John C. Holland, Los Angeles city councilman (1943–1967)
- Bob Ronka, Los Angeles city councilman (1977–1981)
- Michael Tubbs (B.A. 2012, M.A. 2012), 79th mayor of Stockton, California (2017–2021)
- Carmen Vali-Cave (A.B. 1987), Ph.D. 1994), first mayor of Aliso Viejo, California
- Girmay Zahilay (B.A. 2009), King County executive (2025–present), King County councilman (2020–2025)

=== Non-U.S. political officials ===
- Diana Buttu (J.S.M. 2000, J.S.D. 2008), Palestinian political advisor
- Menzies Campbell, British Liberal Democrat Leader (2006–2007)
- Lena Kolarska-Bobińska (post-doctoral fellow in 1974–1976), Polish member of the European Parliament (2009–present)
- John Lipsky (M.A., Ph.D.), acting managing director (CEO), International Monetary Fund, 2011; first deputy managing director (second-in-command, IMF, 2006–11)
- Sribharat Mathukumilli, Indian educationist and politician
- Steven W. Mosher (A.M. 1977, A.M. 1978), Commission on Broadcasting to the People's Republic of China (1991–1992)
- Syed Murad Ali Shah, chief minister of Sindh, Pakistan (2016–present)
- Michael Stephen (J.S.M. 1971), member of Parliament of the United Kingdom (1992–1997)
- Martti Tiuri (M.S. 1956), member of Parliament of Finland (1983–2003)

== Religion ==
- Phil Ashey, B.A. 1978, third bishop of the Diocese of Western Anglicans
- Robert W. McElroy, M.A. 1976, Ph.D. 1989, American Roman Catholic cardinal-designate, sixth bishop of the Roman Catholic Diocese of San Diego
- Katharine Jefferts Schori, B.S. 1974, presiding bishop of the Episcopal Church in the United States (2006–2015)
- Gene Scott, Ph.D. 1957, pastor, religious broadcaster
- Bill Thompson, B.A. 1968, first bishop of the Diocese of Western Anglicans

== Science ==
- Janet Zaph Briggs (A.B. 1931, M.S. 1933), metallurgist; first woman to earn a mining engineering degree at Stanford
- John Chowning (Ph.D.), father of digital music synthesizer, inventor of frequency modulation (FM) algorithm
- Eric Allin Cornell (B.S. 1985), Nobel Prize in Physics
- Merton Davies (B.S. 1937), space scientist
- J. C. Decius (B.S. 1941), physical chemist, molecular spectroscopist; Fellow of the American Physical Society
- Karl Deisseroth (Ph.D. 1998, M.D. 2000), winner of the 2026 Nobel Prize in Physiology or Medicine, neuroscientist, psychiatrist, and bioengineer; creating, developing, and applying the technologies of optogenetics and CLARITY, and for coining the names of these fields
- Delzie Demaree (Ph.D. 1932), botanist
- Thomas Dibblee, geologist
- Bradley Efron (Ph.D. 1960), leading statistician, inventor of bootstrap sampling, 2005 National Medal of Science winner
- Marcus Feldman (Ph.D. 1970), theoretical population geneticist
- Jerome Friedman (postdoc), Nobel Prize in Physics (1990)
- Ulysses S. Grant IV (Ph.D. 1929), geologist and paleontologist; grandson of President Ulysses S. Grant
- Robert H. Grubbs (postdoc), winner of the 2005 Nobel Prize in Chemistry
- Nick M. Haddad (B.S. Biology, 1981), ecologist and conservation biologist
- Theodor W. Hänsch (postdoc and longtime faculty member), winner of the 2005 Nobel Prize in Physics
- Evans M. Harrell II (B.S. math 1972), mathematician known for his research in mathematical physics
- Dudley R. Herschbach (B.S. math, M.S. chem 1955), Nobel Prize winner in chemistry (1986)
- Dennis Robert Hoagland (A.B. 1907), plant physiologist and soil chemist
- Robert C. Hughes (Ph.D.), chemist
- Fazle Hussain (M.S. 1966, Ph.D. 1969), physicist; Cullen Distinguished Professor; Fluid Dynamics Award of AIAA, Fluid engineering Award of ASME and Fluid Dynamics Prize winner; member of US National Academy of Engineering and US National Research Council
- Henry Kendall (postdoc), Nobel Prize in Physics (1990)
- Roger D. Kornberg (Ph.D. 1972), winner of the 2006 Nobel Prize in Chemistry
- Helena Chmura Kraemer (Ph.D. 1963), biostatistician
- Esther Lederberg (A.M. 1946), pioneer of bacterial genetics; contributions include the discovery of lambda phage, the transfer of genes between bacteria by specialized transduction, the development of replica plating, and the discovery of bacterial fertility factor F
- Charles Lieber (Ph.D. 1985 Chem.), nanoscientist
- Phil Ligrani (Ph.D. 1980), eminent scholar in propulsion and professor of mechanical and aerospace engineering at the University of Alabama in Huntsville
- Mariangela Lisanti (Ph.D.), theoretical physicist
- A. Louis London, professor of mechanical engineering, expert on heat exchange
- Theodore Harold Maiman (MS in EE, Ph.D. in physics), inventor who built the first working laser, Japan Prize winner, Wolf Prize winner, inducted into the National Inventors Hall of Fame
- Ximena McGlashan (1916), entomologist, butterfly farmer
- Cai Mingjie (Ph.D. 1990), molecular biologist; now driving a taxi in Singapore
- Paul L. Modrich (Ph.D. 1973), Nobel Prize in Chemistry (2015)
- Bradford Parkinson (Ph.D. 1966), inventor of Global Positioning System (GPS), inducted into National Inventors Hall of Fame
- Kumar Patel (M.S., Ph.D., EE), inventor of carbon dioxide laser (the most widely used laser), IEEE Medal of Honor winner, National Medal of Science winner
- Calvin Quate (Ph.D. 1950), inventor of the atomic force microscope, IEEE medal of honor winner
- Christina Riesselman, paleoceanographer researching Southern Ocean response to changing climate.
- Victor Scheinman (Ph.D.), inventor of the programmable robot arm
- Randy Schekman (Ph.D. in biochemistry), winner of 2002 Albert Lasker Award for Basic Medical Research, 2013 Nobel Prize in Medicine
- Elba Serrano (Ph.D. 1982), neuroscientist and Regents professor of biology at New Mexico State University, recipient of Presidential Award for Excellence in Science, Mathematics, and Engineering Mentoring
- Oscar Elton Sette (B.S. Zoology 1922, Ph.D. Biology 1957), fisheries scientist, pioneer of fisheries oceanography and modern fisheries science
- K. Barry Sharpless (Ph.D. 1965), two-time Nobel Prize in Chemistry winner (2001 and 2022)
- William Shurtleff, researcher and popularizer of soyfoods
- James Spudich (Ph.D. in chemistry), 2012 Lasker Award for 1980s discoveries related to biological motors
- Max Steineke (AB 1921), chief geologist of CASOC responsible for the discovery of oil in Saudi Arabia
- Richard E. Taylor (Ph.D. 1962), Nobel Prize in Physics (1990)
- Ronald Vale (Ph.D. in neural science), 2012 Lasker Award for 1980s discoveries related to biological motors
- Oswald Garrison Villard Jr. (Ph.D., EE), father of "over the horizon" radar
- Grace Wahba (Ph.D. 1966), statistician, developed generalized cross-validation and formulated Wahba's problem
- Gerald Waring (AB), geologist and hydrologist
- Michael Webber (M.S. 1996, Ph.D. 2001), mechanical engineer and public speaker on energy policy
- Carl Wieman (Ph.D. 1977), Nobel Prize in Physics (2001)

== Sports ==
=== Baseball ===
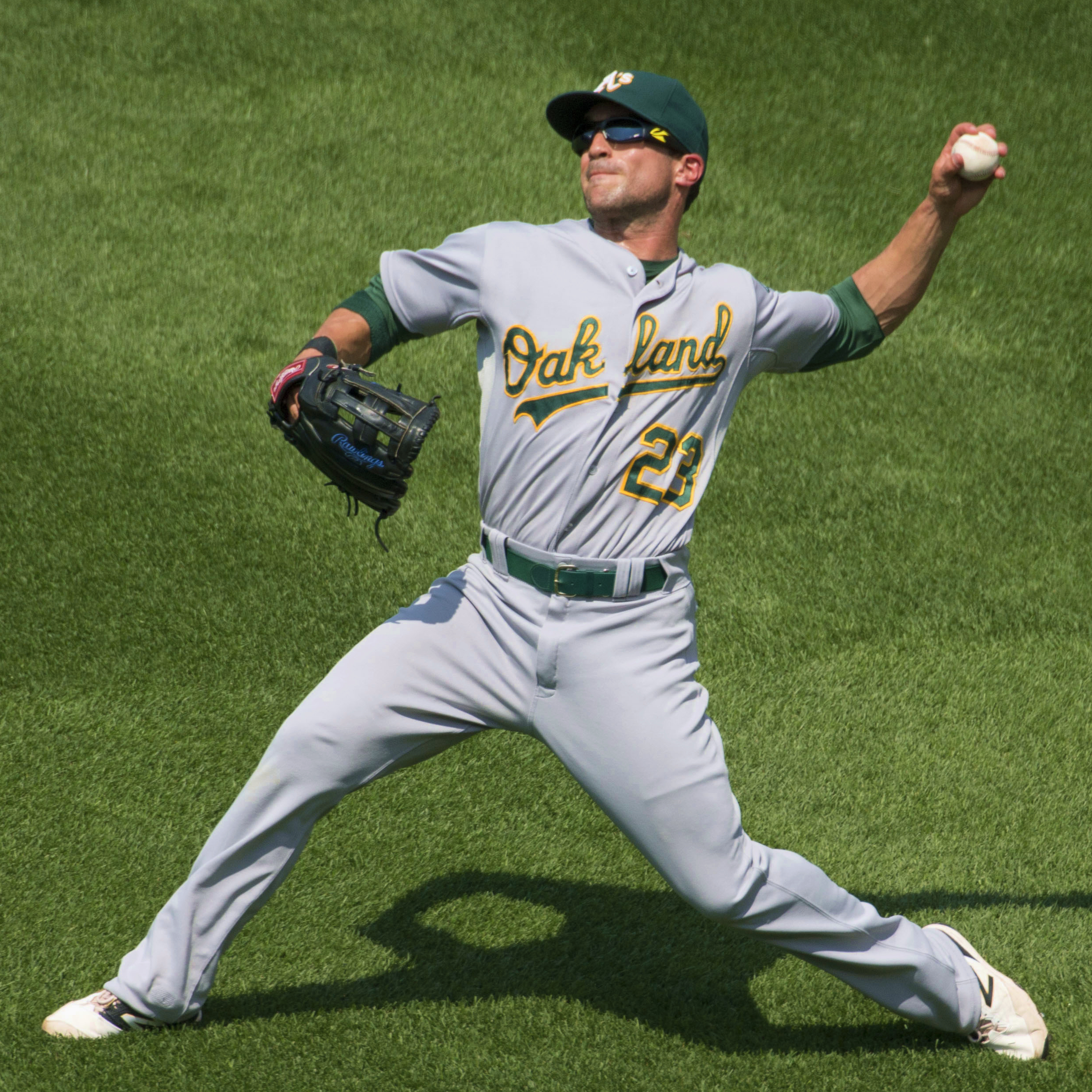
Sam Fuld

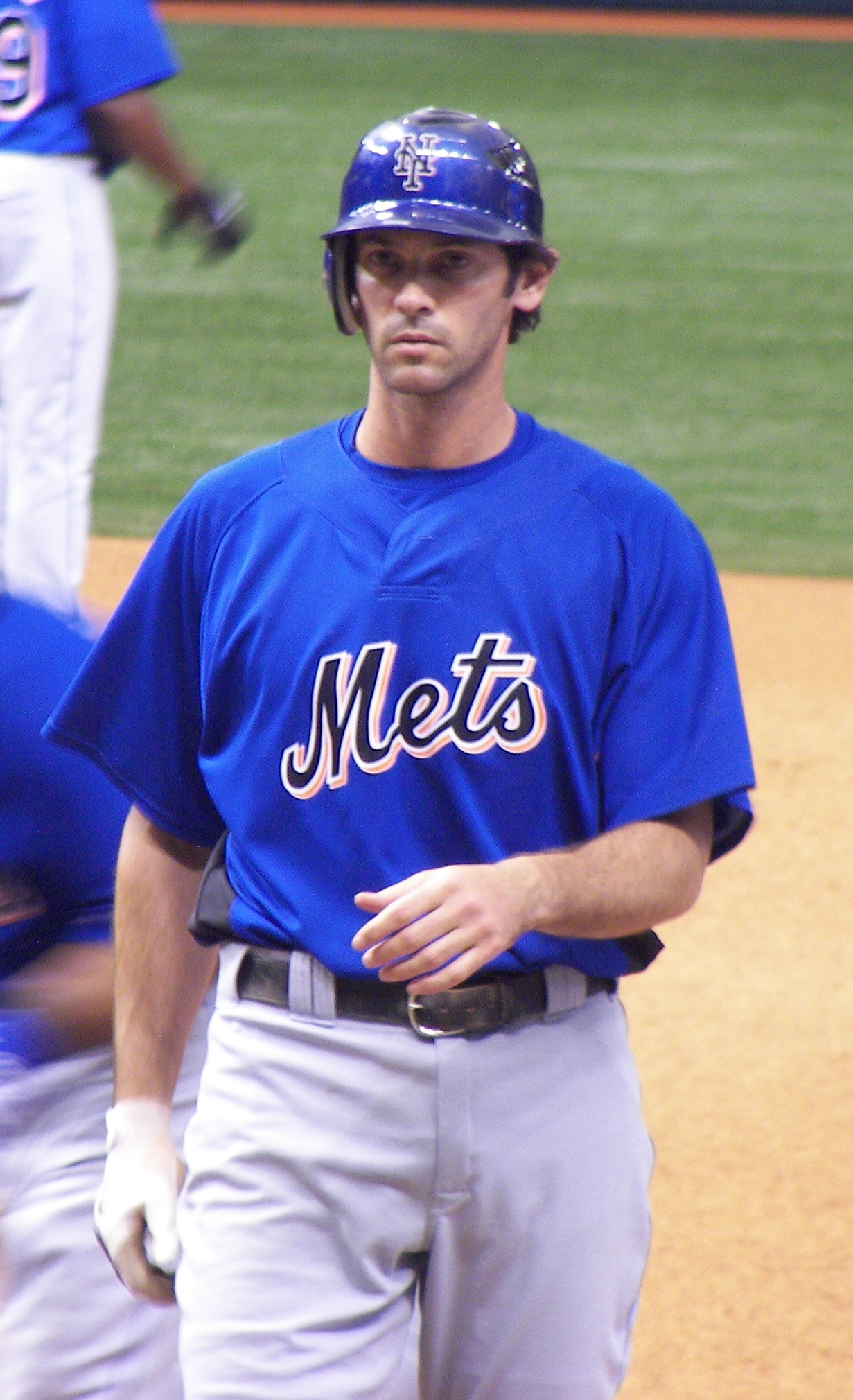
Shawn Green

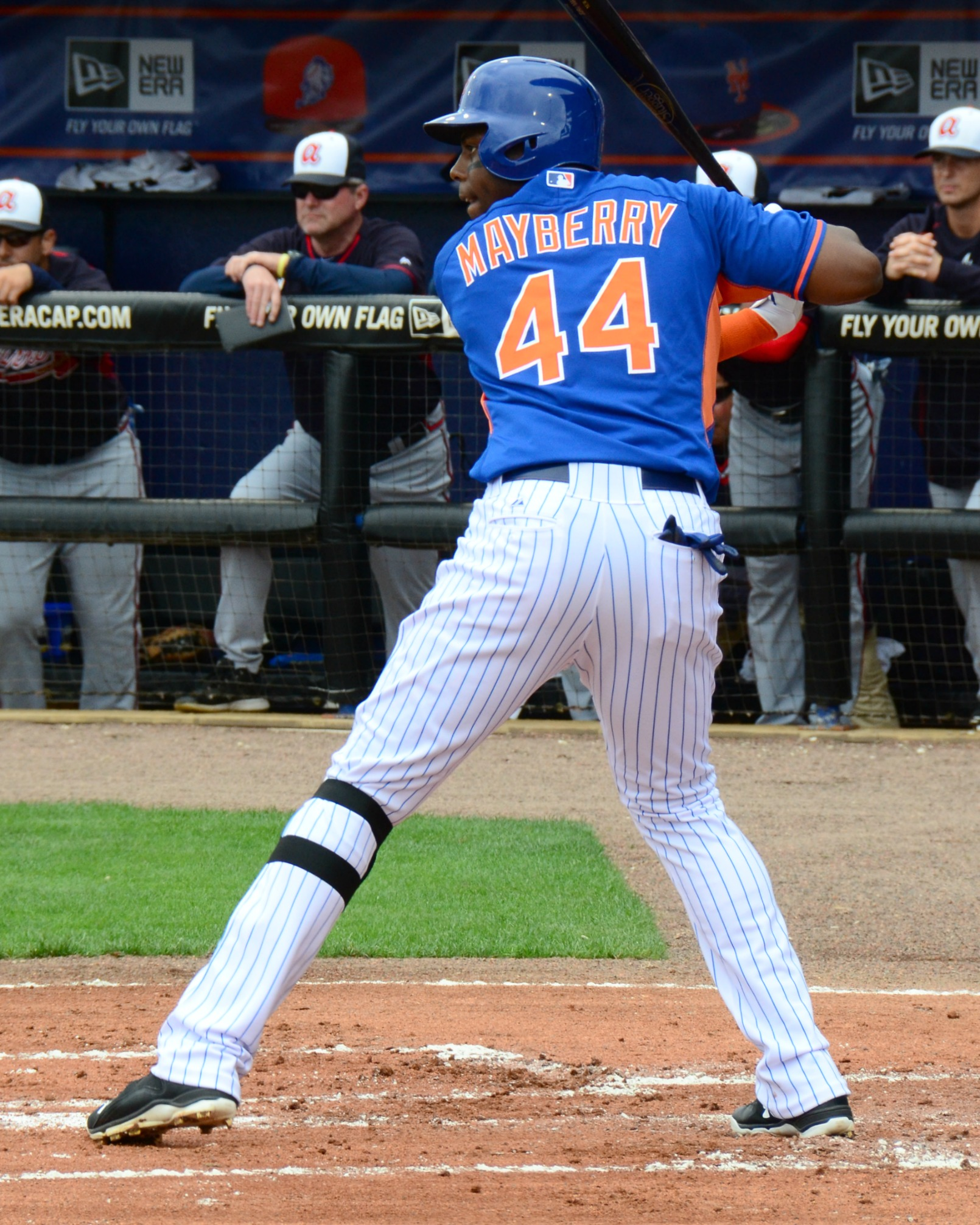
John Mayberry Jr.

- Rubén Amaro, Jr., Major League Baseball outfielder, former Phillies general manager, and coach
- Chuck Armstrong (J.D. 1967), president of the Seattle Mariners
- Bob Boone, retired Major League Baseball catcher and manager; played for Philadelphia Phillies and California Angels
- Eric Bruntlett, retired Major League Baseball infielder; played for Philadelphia Phillies, Houston Astros and New York Yankees
- Jason Castro, Major League Baseball catcher for the Houston Astros
- Tommy Edman, Major League Baseball utility player for St. Louis Cardinals and Los Angeles Dodgers
- Sam Fuld, Major League Baseball outfielder for the Oakland Athletics and general manager for the Philadelphia Phillies
- John Gall, retired Major League Baseball outfielder and first baseman
- Ryan Garko, Major League Baseball outfielder, first baseman and designated hitter; played for Cleveland Indians, San Francisco Giants, and Texas Rangers
- Jody Gerut, retired Major League Baseball outfielder; played for Cleveland Indians and Chicago Cubs
- Shawn Green (attended), retired Major League Baseball right fielder and outfielder; played for Toronto Blue Jays, Los Angeles Dodgers and Arizona Diamondbacks
- Jeremy Guthrie, Major League Baseball pitcher for the Baltimore Orioles and Kansas City Royals
- Jeffrey Hammonds, retired Major League Baseball outfielder; played for Baltimore Orioles, Cincinnati Reds and Colorado Rockies
- Rick Helling, retired Major League Baseball pitcher
- Brian Johnson, retired Major League Baseball catcher; played for San Diego Padres, Detroit Tigers and San Francisco Giants
- Bob Kammeyer, retired Major League Baseball pitcher; played for New York Yankees
- Jim Lonborg, retired Major League Baseball pitcher; played for Boston Red Sox, Milwaukee Brewers and Philadelphia Phillies
- Andrew Lorraine, Major League Baseball pitcher; player for the California Angels, Chicago White Sox, Oakland Athletics, Seattle Mariners, Chicago Cubs, Cleveland Indians, and Milwaukee Brewers
- Jed Lowrie, Major League Baseball infielder with the Oakland Athletics
- John Mayberry Jr., Major League Baseball outfielder for the Philadelphia Phillies
- David McCarty, retired Major League Baseball first baseman and outfielder; played for Minnesota Twins, San Francisco Giants, Seattle Mariners, Kansas City Royals, Tampa Bay Devil Rays, Oakland Athletics and Boston Red Sox
- Jack McDowell, retired Major League Baseball pitcher; played for Chicago White Sox, New York Yankees and Cleveland Indians
- Mike Mussina, retired HOF Major League Baseball pitcher; played for Baltimore Orioles and New York Yankees
- Carlos Quentin, Major League Baseball outfielder for the San Diego Padres
- Greg Reynolds, Major League Baseball pitcher; played for Colorado Rockies
- Bruce Robinson, retired Major League Baseball catcher; played for Oakland A's and New York Yankees
- Ed Sprague, retired Major League Baseball third baseman and current head baseball coach at the University of the Pacific; played for Toronto Blue Jays, Oakland Athletics and Pittsburgh Pirates
- Michael Taylor, Major League Baseball outfielder for the Oakland Athletics
- Brodie Van Wagenen (A.B. 1996), general manager of New York Mets
- Justin Wayne, retired Major League Baseball pitcher; played for Florida Marlins

=== Basketball ===
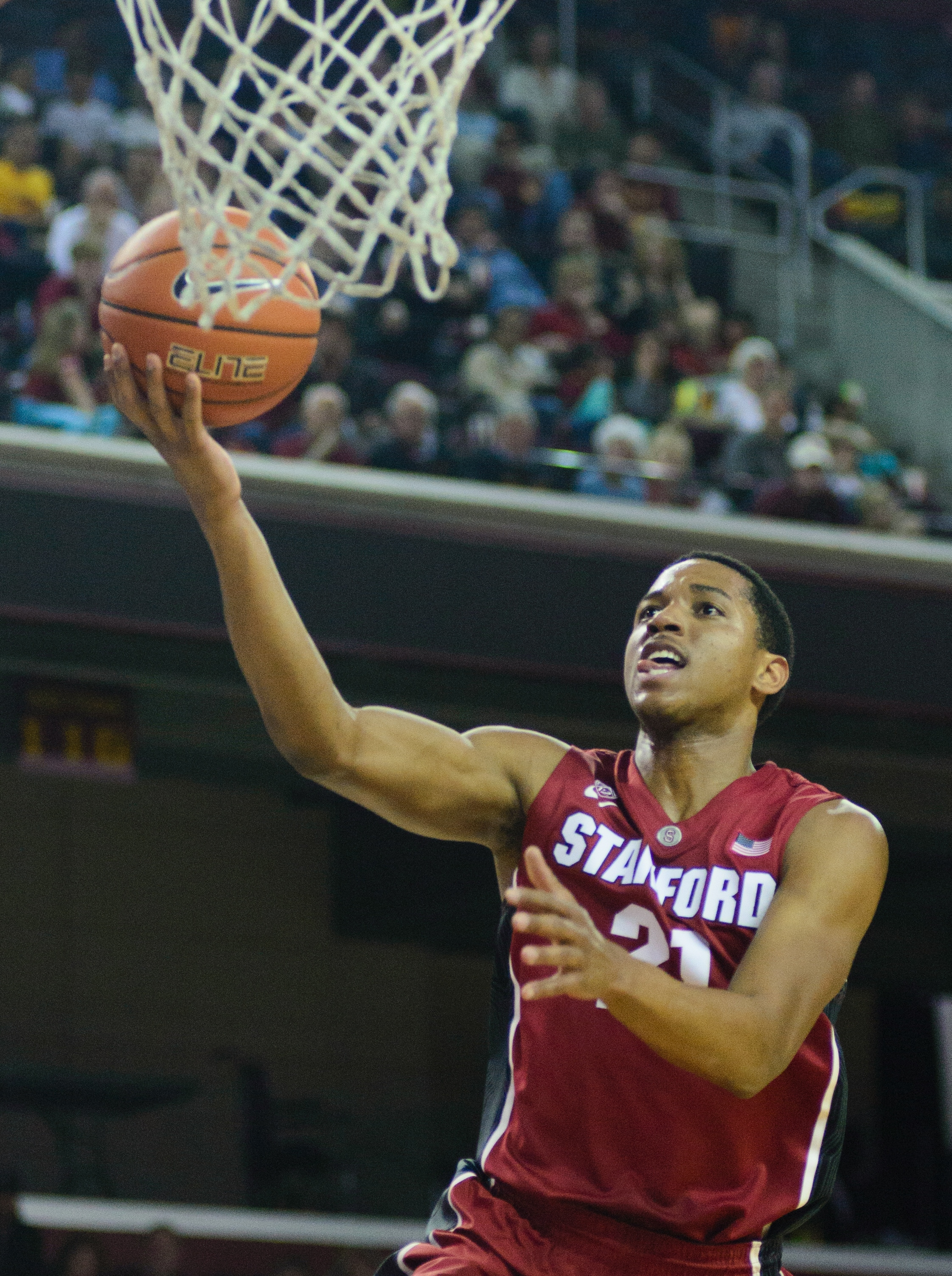
Anthony Brown

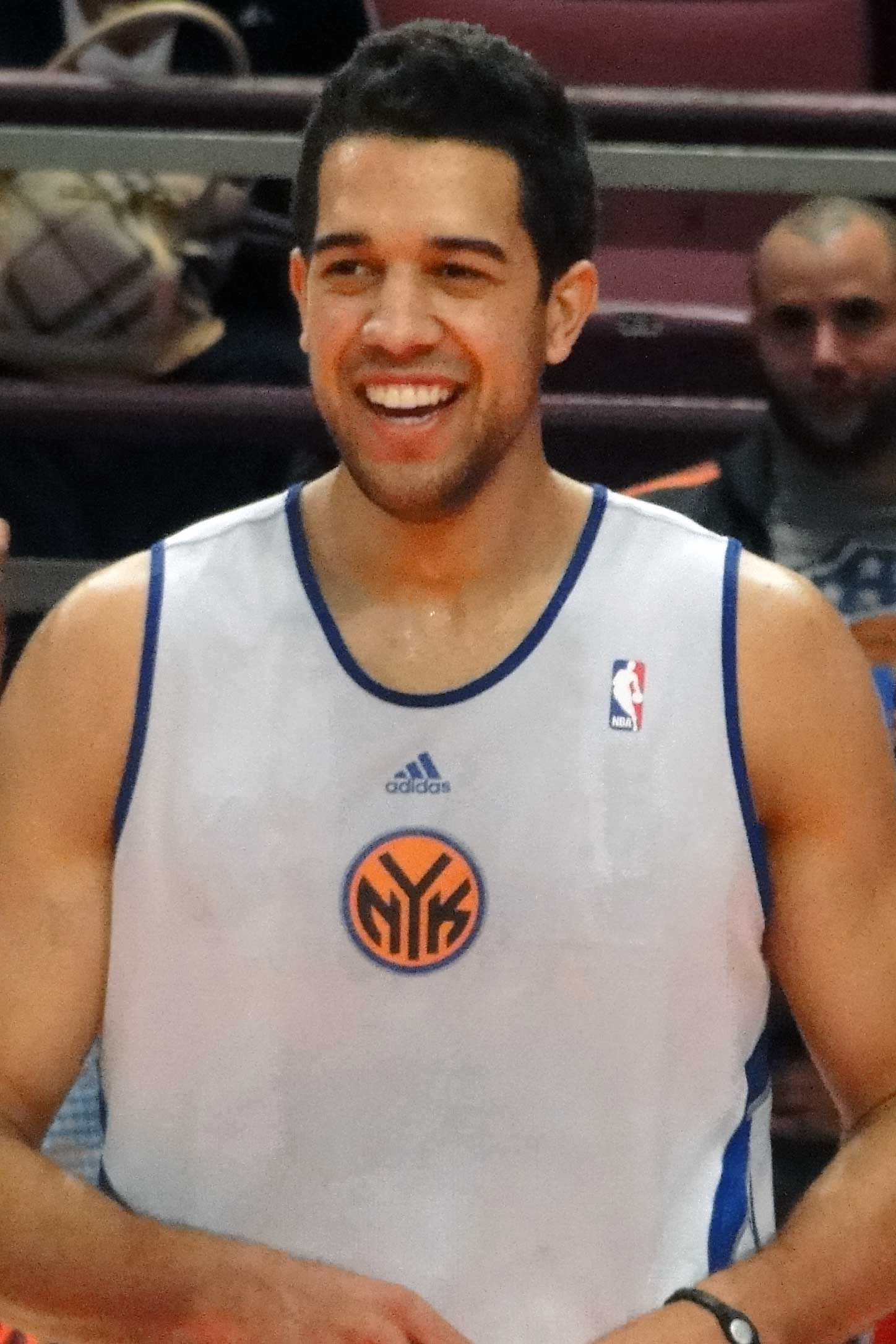
Landry Fields

- Jennifer Azzi, ABL and WNBA
- Curtis Borchardt
- Susan King Borchardt
- Mike Bratz, former NBA player
- Fran Belibi
- Cameron Brink, current WNBA player; top WNBA draft pick in 2024
- Anthony Brown (B.A. 2014), basketball player in the Israeli Basketball Premier League
- Greg Butler
- Josh Childress
- Jarron Collins
- Jason Collins, first openly gay active male athlete in a major North American professional team sport
- Landry Fields
- Kristin Folkl
- Dan Grunfeld
- Sonja Henning, ABL and WNBA
- Lexi Hull, current WNBA player; 6th selection in the first round of the 2022 WNBA draft
- Casey Jacobsen
- Mitch Johnson, head coach of the San Antonio Spurs of the NBA
- Teyo Johnson, basketball and football
- Adam Keefe
- Brevin Knight
- Brook Lopez
- Robin Lopez
- Todd Lichti
- Hank Luisetti
- Mark Madsen
- Carolyn Moos
- Vanessa Nygaard
- Chiney Ogwumike, current WNBA player; top WNBA draft pick and Rookie of the Year in 2014
- Nneka Ogwumike, current WNBA player; top WNBA draft pick and Rookie of the Year in 2012, and WNBA MVP in 2016
- Josh Owens (B.A. 2012), basketball player for Hapoel Tel Aviv of the Israeli Basketball Premier League
- Angie Paccione
- Kate Paye, current Stanford women's basketball head coach
- Nicole Powell, WNBA
- Olympia Scott, WNBA
- Kate Starbird
- Andrew Vlahov, four-time Olympian for Australia
- Jamila Wideman
- Candice Wiggins, WNBA
- Lindsey Yamasaki (2002), volleyball and basketball, WNBA
- George Yardley, Basketball Hall of Fame member

=== Football ===
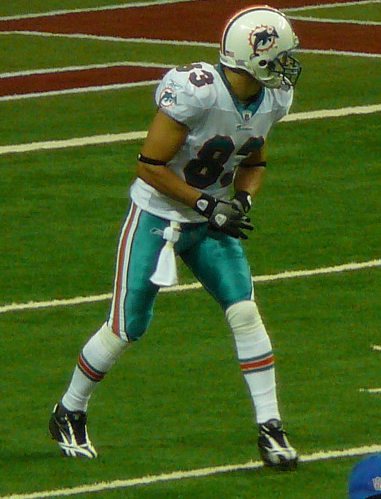
Greg Camarillo

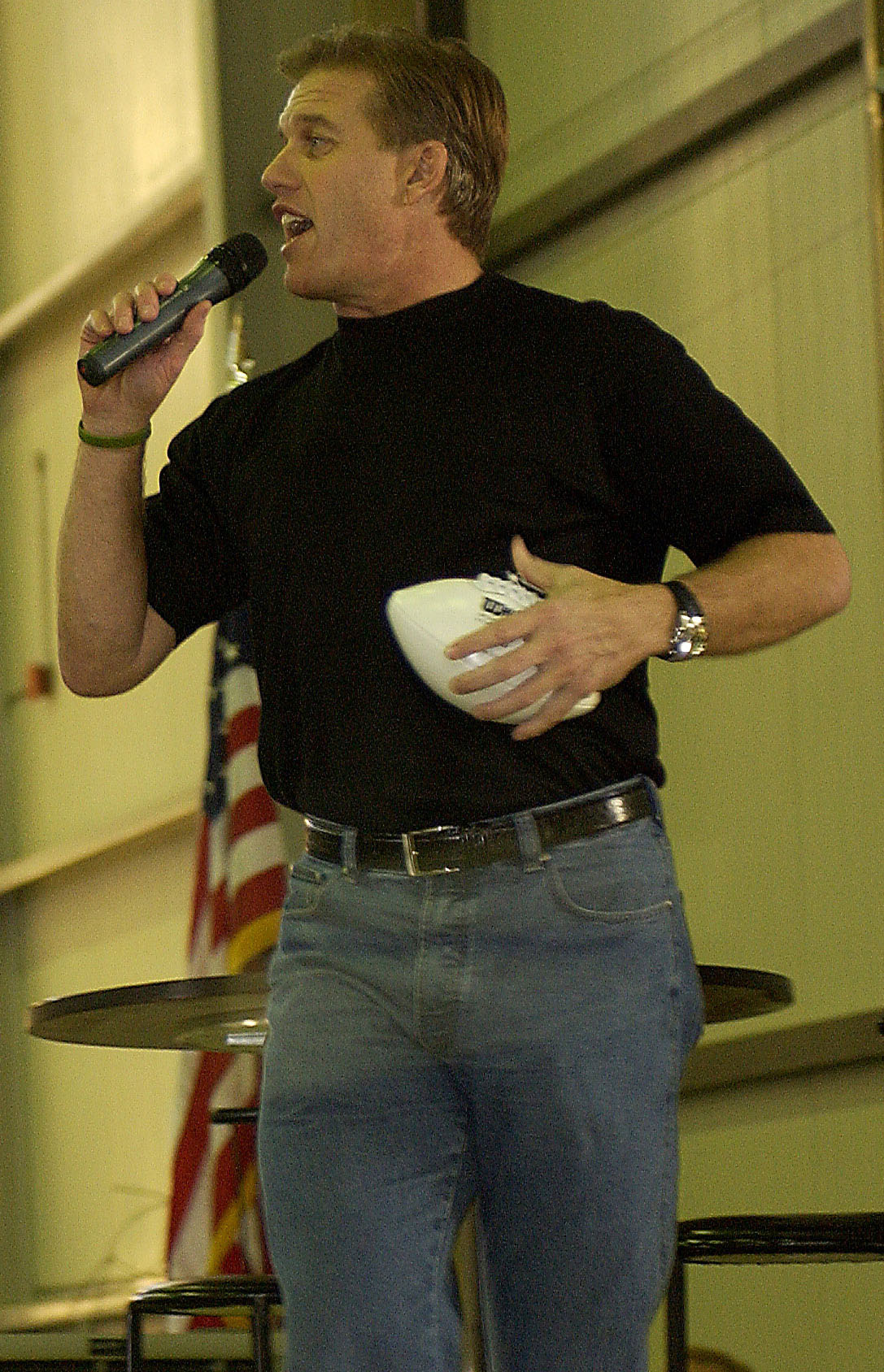
John Elway

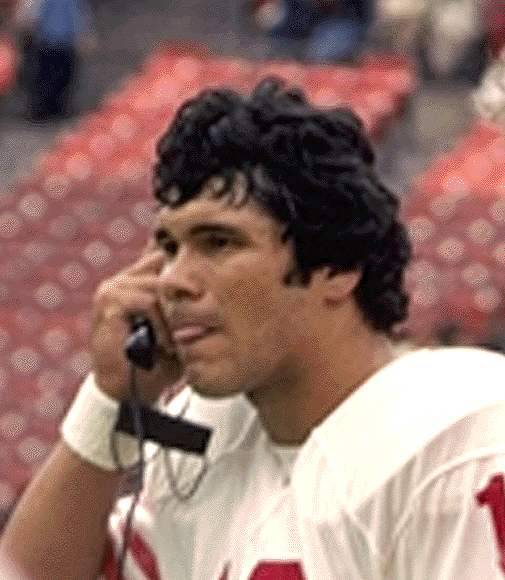
Jim Plunkett

- Frankie Albert (1942), former quarterback in the National Football League; played for San Francisco 49ers
- Jon Alston (2006), linebacker in the NFL; played for St. Louis Rams
- Lester Archambeau (1990), retired defensive end in the NFL; played for Green Bay Packers, Atlanta Falcons and Denver Broncos
- Oshiomogho Atogwe (2005), free safety in the NFL; played for St. Louis Rams and Washington Redskins
- Brad Badger (1997), guard and tackle in the NFL; played for Washington Redskins, Minnesota Vikings and Oakland Raiders
- David Bergeron (2005), linebacker in the NFL; plays for the Carolina Panthers
- Colin Branch (2003?), free safety of the National Football League; played for Carolina Panthers
- John Brodie (1956), retired quarterback in the NFL; played for San Francisco 49ers, had a second career as a Senior PGA Tour professional golfer
- Greg Camarillo (2006), wide receiver in the NFL; played for San Diego Chargers and Miami Dolphins
- Kirk Chambers (2004), offensive tackle in the NFL; played for Cleveland Browns
- Trent Edwards (2007), quarterback in the NFL; plays for the Philadelphia Eagles
- John Elway (A.B. 1982), retired Hall of Fame National Football League quarterback and current executive vice president of football operations for the Denver Broncos
- Zach Ertz (2012), tight end for the Washington Commanders; previously played for Arizona Cardinals and Philadelphia Eagles and won Super Bowl LII
- Toby Gerhart (2010), running back in the NFL; plays for the Minnesota Vikings
- Darrien Gordon (1993), retired defensive back in the NFL; played for San Diego Chargers, Denver Broncos and the Oakland Raiders
- Jerry Gustafson (1956), BC Lions
- Coby Fleener (2012), tight end in the NFL; plays for the Indianapolis Colts
- Kwame Harris (2003), offensive tackle in the NFL; played for San Francisco 49ers and the Oakland Raiders
- Emile Harry, retired wide receiver in the NFL; played for Kansas City Chiefs and Los Angeles Rams
- Eric Heitmann (2002), center in the NFL; played for San Francisco 49ers
- Tony Hill (1977?), three-time Pro Bowl National Football League wide receiver; played for Dallas Cowboys
- James Lofton (1978), retired wide receiver in the NFL; played for Green Bay Packers and Los Angeles Raiders, NCAA champion in the long jump in 1978 while attending Stanford University
- Erik Lorig (2009), fullback in the NFL; plays for the Tampa Bay Buccaneers
- Bryce Love (2019), running back in the NFL; plays for the Washington Redskins; 2017 winner of the Doak Walker Award
- Andrew Luck (2012), former quarterback for the National Football League's Indianapolis Colts (2012–2018); selected first overall in the 2012 NFL draft; four-time Pro Bowler
- John Lynch (1993), retired strong safety in the NFL and current NFL on Fox color commentator; played for Tampa Bay Buccaneers
- John Macaulay, San Francisco 49ers center
- Ken Margerum (1981), retired wide receiver in the NFL; played for Chicago Bears and San Francisco 49ers
- Christian McCaffrey (2016), running back for San Francisco 49ers and Carolina Panthers; NCAA record holder for all-purpose yards in a single season (2015); 2015 Heisman Trophy finalist
- Ed McCaffrey (1991), retired wide receiver in the NFL; played for New York Giants, San Francisco 49ers and Denver Broncos
- Jim Merlo (1973), retired linebacker in the NFL; played for New Orleans Saints
- Trent Murphy (2013), outside linebacker in the NFL; played for Washington Redskins and Buffalo Bills
- Brad Muster (1989), retired fullback in the NFL; played for Chicago Bears and New Orleans Saints
- Darrin Nelson (1982), retired running back and kick returner in the NFL; played for Minnesota Vikings
- Ernie Nevers (1925), former fullback for Duluth Eskimos and Chicago Cardinals of the National Football League; former pitcher for St. Louis Browns of Major League Baseball
- Hank Norberg (1942), end for the San Francisco 49ers and Chicago Bears
- Babatunde Oshinowo (2006), defensive tackle in the NFL; played for Cleveland Browns
- Jim Plunkett (1970), retired quarterback in the NFL, 1970 Heisman Trophy winner; played for New England Patriots, San Francisco 49ers and Oakland/Los Angeles Raiders
- Jon Ritchie (1997), retired fullback in the NFL; played for Oakland Raiders and Philadelphia Eagles
- T.J. Rushing (2006), cornerback and return specialist; played for Indianapolis Colts of the National Football League
- Richard Sherman (2011), cornerback in the NFL; plays for the San Francisco 49ers
- Alex Smith (2005), tight end in the NFL; plays for the Cleveland Browns of the National Football League
- Donnie Spragan (1999), linebacker in the NFL; played for New Orleans Saints and Green Bay Packers
- Will Svitek (2005), offensive tackle for Atlanta Falcons of the NFL
- Leigh Torrence (2005), cornerback in the NFL; played for Green Bay Packers and Atlanta Falcons
- Chris Walsh (1992), retired wide receiver in the NFL; played for Buffalo Bills and Minnesota Vikings
- Bob Whitfield (1992), retired tackle in the NFL; played for Atlanta Falcons, Jacksonville Jaguars and New York Giants
- Tank Williams (2002), safety in the NFL; played for Tennessee Titans and Minnesota Vikings
- Coy Wire (2002), linebacker and safety in the NFL; played for Buffalo Bills
- Kailee Wong (1998), retired linebacker in the NFL; played for Minnesota Vikings and Houston Texans

=== Golf ===
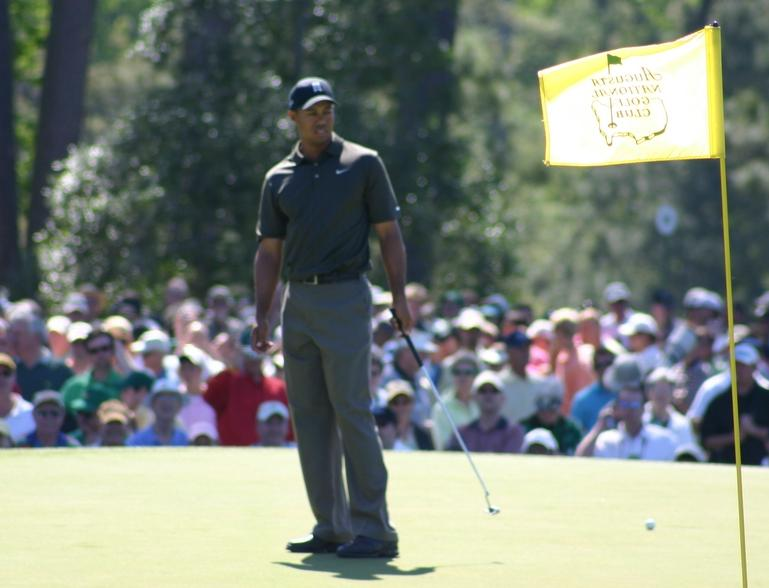
Tiger Woods

- Viraat Badhwar
- Notah Begay III
- Hilary Lunke
- Casey Martin
- Patrick Rodgers
- Tom Watson
- Michelle Wie
- Tiger Woods (non-degreed)
- Rose Zhang

=== Gymnastics ===
- Amy Chow, Olympic gold medalist
- Nancy Goldsmith, Israeli Olympic gymnast
- Ivana Hong, U.S. Olympic team alternate and 2007 World Champion
- Carly Janiga, NCAA champion in uneven bars, 2010
- Heather Purnell, captain of the 2004 Canadian Olympic Team
- Jennifer Sey, former U.S. National Gymnastics Champion
- Samantha Shapiro, five-time member of the USA Gymnastics National Team, 2007 U.S. junior uneven bars champion, 2008 U.S. junior uneven bars, and balance beam champion
- Kerri Strug, Olympic gold medalist

=== Poker ===
- Diego Cordovez (A.B., M.S.), World Series of Poker Champion
- Ben Yu, poker player, World Series of Poker bracelet winner

=== Rowing ===
- Adam Kreek, rowing, Canadian National Team
- Elle Logan, two-time gold medal-winning rower in 2008 Beijing Olympics and in 2012 London Olympics
- Kent Mitchell, two-time Olympic champion, two-time national champion, member of Stanford Hall of Fame
- Jamie Schroeder, rowing, U.S. National Team

=== Soccer ===
- Nicole Barnhart, National Women's Soccer League and US national team; currently plays for Washington Spirit
- Rachel Buehler, former National Women's Soccer League and US national team; formerly played for Portland Thorns FC (retired)
- Tierna Davidson, National Women's Soccer League and United States Women's National Team; currently plays with Chicago Red Stars
- Todd Dunivant, Major League Soccer; currently plays for Los Angeles Galaxy
- Simon Elliott, New Zealand national soccer team player; Chivas USA
- Julie Foudy, former US national team soccer player
- Adam Jahn, currently plays for San Jose Earthquakes
- Roger Levesque, former Major League Soccer soccer player
- Camille Levin, soccer player
- Chad Marshall, Major League Soccer; currently plays for Columbus Crew
- Ryan Nelsen, New Zealand international soccer player; formerly with D.C. United in MLS, now with Blackburn Rovers in English Premiership
- Mariah Nogueira, former National Women's Soccer League; formerly played for Seattle Reign FC (retired)
- Teresa Noyola, Nadeshiko League Japan women's league and Mexico national team; currently plays for FC Kibi International University Charme
- Kelley O'Hara, National Women's Soccer League and US national team; currently plays for NJ/NY Gotham FC
- Christen Press, Damallsvenskan, National Women's Soccer League and US national team; currently plays for Angel City FC
- Ali Riley, Damallsvenskan and New Zealand national team; currently plays for ACFC
- Lindsay Taylor, former National Women's Soccer League; played for Washington Spirit
- Ben Zinn, international soccer player and academic at Georgia Tech

=== Skating, ice ===
- Nick Bravin, Olympic fencer
- John Coyle (B.S. 1986 Engineering), Olympic speed skater, silver medalist at the 1994 Winter Olympics as a member of the men's 5,000-meter relay team
- Rachael Flatt (B.S. 2015), ice skater in 2010 Winter Olympics
- Eric Heiden (B.S. 1984, M.D. 1991), speed skater, 5 gold medals at 1980 Lake Placid Olympics; cycling, competed in 1985 Giro D'Italia, 1986 Tour de France
- Debi Thomas (B.S. Engineering 1989), figure skater, bronze medalist at the 1988 Winter Olympics

=== Swimming ===
- Elin Austevoll, member of the 1996 Norwegian Olympic team
- Randall Bal
- Elaine Breeden, member of the 2008 U.S. Olympic team
- Maya DiRado, double gold medal winner in the 2016 Summer Olympics
- Jason Dunford, member of the 2008 Kenyan Olympic team
- Janet Evans, four-time Olympic gold-medalist
- Catherine Fox, double gold medal winner in the 1996 Olympics in Atlanta
- John Hencken
- Morgan Hentzen, gold medalist at the 2003 Pan American Games
- Misty Hyman, gold medalist in the 2000 Olympic Games
- Jenna Johnson, three-time medalist in the 1984 Olympic Games
- Janel Jorgensen, member of the 1988 U.S. Olympic team in Seoul, South Korea
- Tara Kirk
- Katie Ledecky (Class of 2020), eight-time Olympic gold medalist
- Simone Manuel, double gold medal winner in the 2016 Summer Olympics
- Peter Marshall
- Lea Loveless Maurer, formerly head coach of Stanford Cardinal women's swimming and diving team
- John Moffet, member of the 1980 and 1984 United States Olympic teams
- Pablo Morales, two-time gold medalist 1992 Olympics, medalist in 1984 Olympics
- Anthony Mosse (OBE BA (Hons) & MBA), Olympic medalist, 1988
- Andrea Murez, Israeli-American Olympic swimmer for Israel
- Lia Neal, swimmer, two-time Olympic medalist
- Susan Rapp, medalist 1984 Olympics, member 1980 Olympic team
- Brian Retterer
- Markus Rogan
- Gabrielle Rose
- Jeff Rouse
- Summer Sanders
- Julia Smit, member of the 2008 Olympic team
- Jenny Thompson
- Ben Wildman-Tobriner, double gold medal winner in the 2007 World Aquatics Championships, 2008 Gold Medal Olympic swimmer, former world record holder

=== Tennis ===
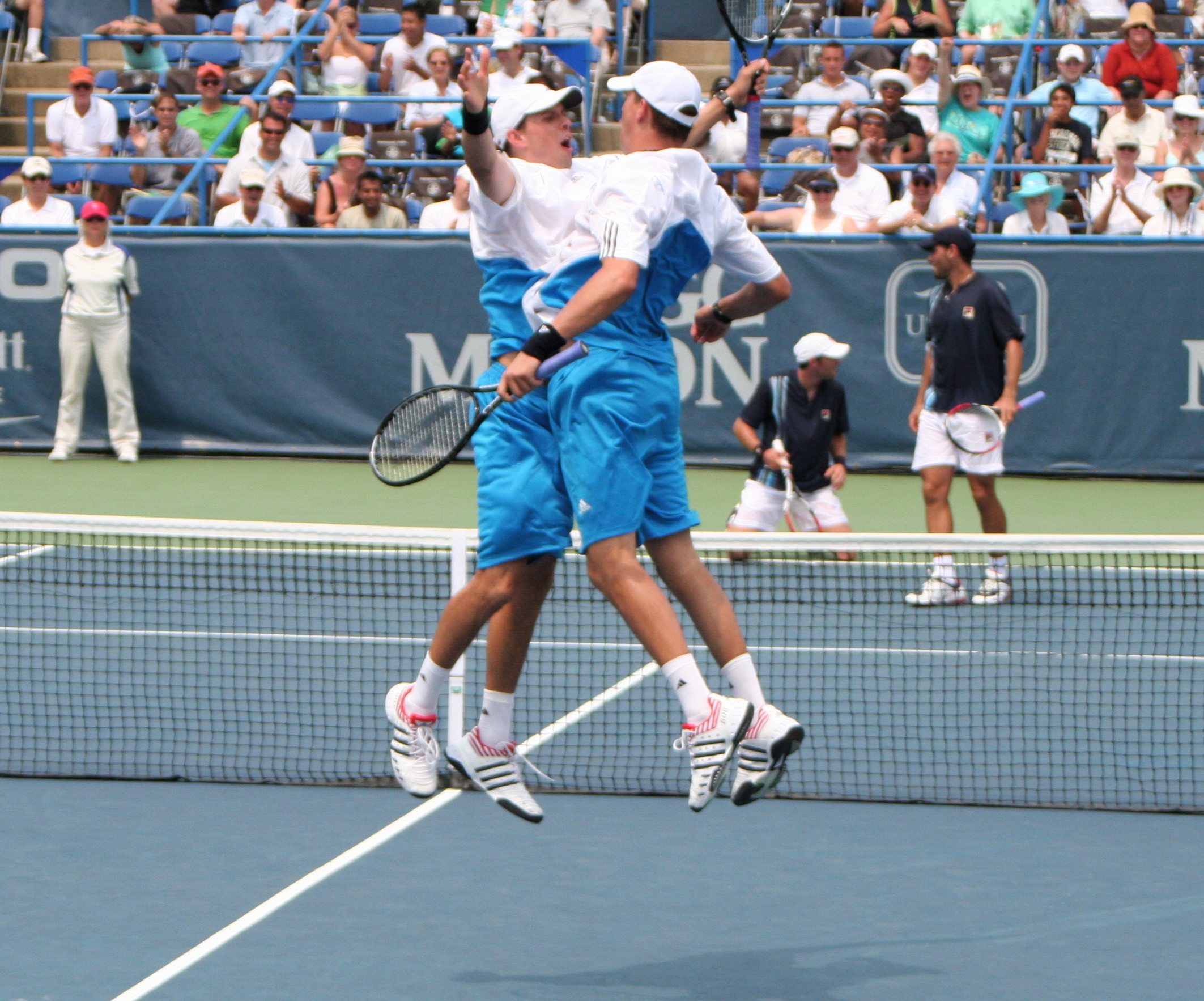
The Bryan Brothers

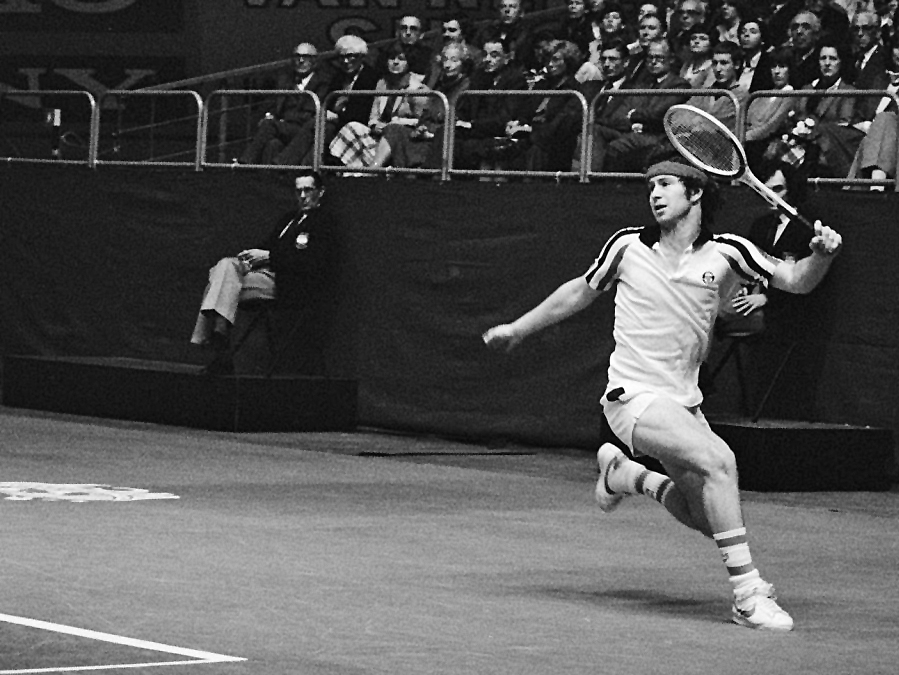
John McEnroe

- Geoff Abrams
- Kristie Ahn
- Alexis Blokhina
- Bob Bryan (non-degreed)
- Mike Bryan (non-degreed)
- Elise Burgin
- Pat DuPré
- Nicole Gibbs
- Paul Goldstein
- Dick Gould
- Jim Grabb
- Laura Granville
- Jim Gurfein
- Julie Heldman
- John Letts
- Scott Lipsky
- Sandy Mayer
- John McEnroe (non-degreed)
- Patrick McEnroe
- Matt Mitchell
- Peter Rennert
- Donna Rubin (born 1959)
- Jeff "Salzy" Salzenstein
- Jonathan Stark
- Roscoe Tanner

=== Track and field ===
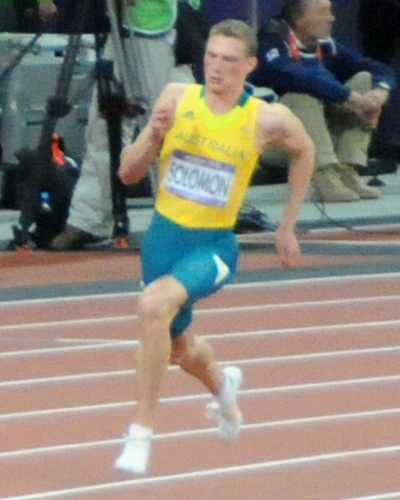
Steven Solomon

- Mike Boit (M.S. 78), bronze medal at 1972 Munich Olympics in 800m track
- Russell Wolf Brown, professional miler
- Jillian Camarena-Williams, shot put, 2008 Beijing Olympics
- Ian Dobson, track and field, 2008 Olympics
- Ryan Hall, cross country, track and field
- Regina Jacobs, cross country, track and field
- Bob Mathias (1953), decathlon, gold medal at 1948 and 1952 Olympics; U.S. congressman
- Steven Solomon, track and field, 2012 Olympics
- Toby Stevenson, pole vault

=== Volleyball ===
- Scott Fortune (1988), gold medal at 1988 Seoul Olympics, team captain of bronze medal team at 1992 Barcelona Olympics
- Alix Klineman (2011), bronze medal at the 2011 Pan American Games
- Ogonna Nnamani (B.A.S. 2005), 2004 Olympian, winner of 2005 Honda-Broderick Cup
- Beverly Oden (1993), 1996 Olympian, 1990 AVCA Player of the Year, 1985 Honda-Broderick Award
- Kim Oden (1986), 1988, 1992 Olympic team captain, Player of the Decade for 1980s AVCA's All-Decade Team
- Kathryn Plummer (2020), silver medal at 2024 Paris Olympics, 2017 and 2018 AVCA Player of the Year
- Jon Root (1986), gold medal at 1988 Seoul Olympics
- Erik Shoji (2009), bronze medal at 2016 Rio Olympics
- Kawika Shoji (2007), bronze medal at 2016 Rio Olympics
- Logan Tom (2003), professional beach volleyball, 2000 Olympian
- Kerri Walsh Jennings (1999), 2004, 2008, and 2012 Olympic gold medalist in beach volleyball

=== Water polo ===
- Tony Azevedo
- Ellen Estes, Olympic water polo player
- Ashley Grossman, water polo player
- Brenda Villa, Olympic water polo player

=== Other sports ===
- Alexandra Botez (B.A. 2017), chess player and commentator
- Malin Burnham, sailor, youngest skipper to win a World Championship in the International Star Class
- Steve Fossett (B.S.), sailor, aviator, and adventurer who was the first person to circumnavigate the globe solo in a balloon
- Matt Gentry (B.A. 2004), wrestler, 2008 Canadian Olympic team member, 2004 NCAA Div. I National Champion
- Ari Greenberg, world junior bridge champion
- Eileen Gu (B.A. 2026), freestyle skiing, Olympic medalist (3 gold, 3 silver)
- Sara Lowe, artistic swimming, Olympic bronze medalists and Pan American Games champion.
- Alexander Massialas (B.S. 2016 Mechanical Engineering), Olympic fencer, 2016 silver medalist in individual Men's Foil, 2020 bronze medalist in Team FoilDorian "Doc" Paskowitz, surfer and physician
- Daniel Naroditsky (B.A. 2019 History), chess Grandmaster, internet personality and commentator, rated top 150 in the World, top 20 in the U.S., and top 75 in blitz and rapid
- Ramona Shelburne, softball player and sportswriter
- Sami Jo Small (B.S. Engineering 1998), Olympic and professional women's ice hockey goalie, Stanford University Men's Hockey, Pac-8 Conference (ACHA) MVP, silver medalist, 1998 Winter Olympics; gold medalist, 2002 Winter Olympics and 2006 Winter Olympic
- Walter A. Starr, Jr., mountaineer (1924)
- Josh Thomson (attended), wrestler, current mixed martial artist in the Ultimate Fighting Championship Lightweight Division

== Notable current students ==
- Zoe Atkin, freestyle skiing, Olympic medalist (1 bronze)
- Rachel Grant, climate activist
- Asher Hong, gymnastics, National U.S. Team, Olympic medalist (1 bronze)
- Ethan Josh Lee, Korean-American actor
- Simone Manuel, swimmer, four-time Olympic medalist and two-time Olympic gold medalist
- David Mazouz, actor
- Elizabeth Price, gymnast
- Maggie Steffens, water polo, gold medal at the 2012 Summer Olympics
- Tan Sze En, Singaporean gymnast

== Fictional alumni ==
=== In film ===
- In The American President, President Andrew Shepherd mentions that he went to Stanford.
- In Antitrust, the main character is depicted as a Stanford graduate.
- In Avatar, Grace Augustine wears a Stanford T-shirt.
- In Challengers, two of the main characters attend Stanford while the third main character visits them on campus
- In Die Hard, Joseph Yoshinobu Takagi graduated from Stanford Law School in 1962.
- In Double Indemnity (1944), the storyline is about a wife who conspires with her lover to kill her husband in Palo Alto on his way to a Stanford reunion.
- In The Family Plan, attending Stanford is a key theme throughout including the final scene.
- In The Internship, characters portrayed by Vince Vaughn and Owen Wilson seek help from fictional Stanford Professor Charles Xavier.
- In Legally Blonde, the storyline was inspired by Amanda Brown's real-life experience as a student at Stanford Law School. Character Warner Huntington III is revealed to have attended Stanford.
- In Mother of the Bride, all four main characters are noted to have attended Stanford, a centerpiece of the storyline.

=== In literature ===
- In East of Eden (1952) by John Steinbeck, Aron Trask (aka Aaron Trask) is enrolled at Stanford University when he runs away to join the U.S. Army during World War I.
- In the Left Behind series (1995–2007) by Tim LaHaye and Jerry B. Jenkins, character Chloe Steele attended Stanford.

=== In television ===
- In 24, characters Kate Warner and President Wayne Palmer have Stanford degrees.
- In 9-1-1, character Darius states his intention to go to Stanford in Seasons 3 and 6. Stanford is also mentioned in Season 2 Episode 2, where it is mentioned that the basketball team's top recruits wanted to go to either "Duke or Stanford"
- In Castle, character Detective Kate Beckett attended Stanford as a pre-law undergrad.
- In Chuck, the main character Chuck Bartowski is presented as a Stanford dropout, and Stanford plays a central role in the theme.
- In Cobra Kai, character Miguel Diaz is accepted to Stanford in the series finale.
- In Countdown, the main character Special Agent Amber Oliveras went to Stanford.
- In Dharma & Greg, main character Greg Montgomery graduated from Stanford Law School.
- In Entourage, character Lloyd Lee received his MBA from Stanford.
- In Grey's Anatomy, character Cristina Yang holds a Doctor of Medicine from Stanford, where her former boyfriend Colin Marlowe was a professor.
- In How I Met Your Mother, character Stella (Ted's almost bride) attended Stanford as both an undergrad and medical school graduate.
- In Just Shoot Me!, character Maya Gallo attended Stanford.
- In M*A*S*H, character Captain B. J. Hunnicutt graduated from Stanford.
- In The Morning Show, character Stella Bak attended Stanford. A 2023 episode is named "The Stanford Student".
- In Landman, Jerry Jones plays himself describing his business revolving around Stanford and his daughter attending.
- In MythBusters, several scenes were filmed at Stanford and included real Stanford students.
- In Parenthood, character Julia Braverman-Graham attended Stanford for law school.
- In Remington Steele, character Laura Holt (portrayed by Stephanie Zimbalist) graduated from Stanford.
- In Scandal, character Quinn Perkins (also known as Lindsay Dwyer) graduated from Stanford Law School.
- In seaQuest DSV, character Lucas Wolenczak (portrayed by Jonathan Brandis) graduated from Stanford.
- In Star Trek, character Jonathan Archer (portrayed by Scott Bakula) studied at Stanford.
- In Supernatural, character Sam Winchester (portrayed by Jared Padalecki) was studying law at Stanford.
- In The West Wing, characters Joey Lucas (portrayed by Marlee Matlin) and Surgeon General Millicent Griffith (portrayed by Mary Kay Place) both graduated from Stanford.
- In The X-Files, character Dana Scully earned her medical degree from Stanford University.
- In Zero Day, the president of the United States (played by Angela Basset) prominently wears at Stanford sweatshirt.

=== In anime ===
- In the anime and manga series Kaguya-sama: Love is War, protagonist Miyuki Shirogane attends and graduates from Stanford.

== See also ==
- List of companies founded by Stanford University alumni
