= Deaths in January 2007 =

The following is a list of notable deaths in January 2007.

Entries for each day are listed alphabetically by surname. A typical entry lists information in the following sequence:

- Name, age, country of citizenship at birth, subsequent country of citizenship (if applicable), reason for notability, cause of death (if known), and reference.

== January 2007 ==
=== 1 ===
- A. I. Bezzerides, 98, Turkish-American novelist and screenwriter, injuries from a fall.
- Leonard Fraser, 55, Australian serial killer, heart attack.
- Jørgen Hammeken, 88, Danish footballer.
- Julius Hegyi, 83, American conductor, Alzheimer's disease.
- Charles Hyatt, 75, Jamaican actor (Club Paradise, Cool Runnings, The Bushbaby), lung cancer.
- Tad Jones, 54, American jazz music historian, complications from a fall.
- Ernie Koy, 97, American baseball player.
- Roland Levinsky, 63, South African medical scientist, Plymouth University Vice Chancellor, electric shock induced heart attack.
- Tillie Olsen, 94, American writer, natural causes.
- Del Reeves, 74, American country singer, emphysema.
- Eleonore Schoenfeld, 81, Slovenian-born cellist and teacher at USC Thornton School of Music, heart attack.
- Darrent Williams, 24, American football player (Denver Broncos), shot.

=== 2 ===
- Garry Betty, 49, American CEO of Earthlink, adrenocortical carcinoma.
- Jean-Pierre Bolomey, 80, Swiss Olympic field hockey player (1952).
- Sir Eric Denton, 77, British marine biologist.
- Elizabeth Fox-Genovese, 65, American historian, complications from surgery.
- Sergio Jiménez, 69, Mexican actor, heart attack.
- Mauno Jokipii, 82, Finnish professor and World War II researcher, complications after hip replacement surgery.
- Teddy Kollek, 95, Israeli Mayor of Jerusalem (1965–1993), natural causes.
- Don Massengale, 69, American PGA Tour golf player, heart attack.
- A. Richard Newton, 55, Australian-born technology pioneer and professor at University of California, Berkeley, pancreatic cancer.
- Paek Nam-sun, 78, North Korean Foreign minister.
- David Perkins, 87, American Stanford University geneticist, after short illness.
- Dan Shaver, 56, American NASCAR driver and ARCA race car driver/owner, cancer.
- Robert C. Solomon, 64, American scholar of continental philosophy.

=== 3 ===
- Annibale Ciarniello, 106, Italian World War I veteran.
- Olgierd Ciepły, 70, Polish hammer thrower and Olympian (1960, 1964).
- János Fürst, 71, Hungarian-born orchestral conductor, cancer.
- William Jencks, 79, American biochemist.
- Jim Mooney, 83, Australian politician, member of the Tasmanian House of Assembly (1976–1979).
- Earl Reibel, 76, Canadian ice hockey forward (Detroit Red Wings), 1956 Lady Byng Trophy winner, complications of stroke.
- William Verity Jr., 89, United States Secretary of Commerce (1987–1989), complications from pneumonia.
- Sir Cecil Walker, 82, British Ulster Unionist MP for North Belfast (1983–2001), heart attack.
- Michael Yeats, 85, Irish Fianna Fáil senator (1961–1981) and son of W. B. Yeats.

=== 4 ===
- Juma Akukweti, 59, Tanzanian MP for Chama Cha Mapinduzi (1990–2007), injuries from plane crash.
- Ben Gannon, 54, Australian theatre, film and television producer, cancer.
- Christopher Greenbury, 55, American film editor (American Beauty, There's Something About Mary, Daddy Day Care).
- Helen Hill, 36, American independent film-maker, shot.
- Sir Lewis Hodges, 88, British Air Chief Marshal.
- Gren, 72, British newspaper cartoonist.
- Steve Krantz, 83, American film and TV producer (Fritz the Cat), husband of Judith Krantz, complications of pneumonia.
- Bob Milliken, 80, American Brooklyn Dodgers pitcher (1953–1954), cardiac arrest.
- Gáspár Nagy, 57, Hungarian poet and writer.
- Padre Léo SCJ, 45, Brazilian Roman Catholic priest and Founder of the "Bethânia" Community (1995–2007), lymphoma.
- Sandro Salvadore, 67, Italian footballer, heart attack.
- Jan Schröder, 65, Dutch cyclist.
- Marais Viljoen, 91, South African president (1979–1984), heart failure.

=== 5 ===
- Momofuku Ando, 96, Taiwanese-born inventor of Nissin instant ramen noodles including the Cup Noodle, heart failure.
- E. J. Hughes, 93, Canadian painter, heart failure.
- Chih Ree Sun, 83, Chinese-American physicist and poet, kidney and lung cancer.
- Francis Sullivan, 89, Canadian Olympic gold medal-winning (1952) ice hockey player.

=== 6 ===
- Juan Manuel Alejándrez, 62, Mexican footballer and Olympian (1968).
- Bernard Boone, 87, French Olympic field hockey player (1948, 1952).
- Bill W. Clayton, 78, American Speaker of the Texas House of Representatives (1975–1983), natural causes.
- Mario Danelo, 21, American football placekicker for University of Southern California, fall from a cliff.
- Yvon Durelle, 77, Canadian boxing champion, complications from a stroke.
- Frédéric Etsou-Nzabi-Bamungwabi, 76, Congolese Cardinal Archbishop of Kinshasa, complications of diabetes.
- Antonella Kerr, Marchioness of Lothian, 84, British journalist and broadcaster.
- Charmion King, 81, Canadian actress.
- Sneaky Pete Kleinow, 72, American special effects artist and pedal steel guitarist (Flying Burrito Brothers), Alzheimer's disease.
- Suad Nasr, 53, Egyptian actress, complications from liposuction.
- Annelies Reinhold, 90, Austrian actress.
- Mohamed Lamine Sanha, Bissau-Guinean Navy Chief of Staff, shot.
- Ira D. Wallach, 97, American philanthropist and CEO of Central National-Gottesman (1956–1979).
- Roberta Wohlstetter, 94, American historian of military intelligence.

=== 7 ===
- Bobby Hamilton, 49, American NASCAR driver, 2004 Craftsman Truck Series Champion, head and neck cancer.
- Russell Honey, 85, Canadian politician, member of the House of Commons of Canada (1962-1972).
- Magnus Magnusson, 77, Icelandic television presenter (Mastermind, 1972–1997), pancreatic cancer.
- Ernesto Martínez, 55, Cuban Olympic bronze medal-winning volleyball player (1972, 1976, 1980).
- Olli-Matti Multamäki, 58, Finnish commander of the Finnish Army, illness.
- Lou Palazzi, 85, American football player and umpire.
- Hotte Paksha Rangaswamy, 74, Indian politician, Guinness World Record-holder for contesting elections, brief illness.

=== 8 ===
- Jane Bolin, 98, American New York City family court judge (1939–1979) and first African American female judge.
- Arthur Cockfield, Baron Cockfield, 90, British proponent of the European single market and Vice President of the European Commission (1985–1989).
- Ken Cranston, 89, English test cricketer (1947–1948).
- Yvonne De Carlo, 84, Canadian-born American actress (The Ten Commandments, The Munsters, McLintock!).
- David Ervine, 53, Northern Irish leader of the Progressive Unionist Party, complications from heart attack and stroke.
- Peter Flanagan, 65, British rugby league player for Great Britain and Hull KR.
- Han Bong-soo, 73, Korean martial arts master and film fight choreographer.
- José Quaglio, 80, Italian actor and theatre director.
- Italo Sarrocco, 108, Italian World War I veteran.
- Iwao Takamoto, 81, American animator (Scooby-Doo, Where Are You!, Sleeping Beauty) and film director (Charlotte's Web), heart failure.
- Judith Vladeck, 83, American labor lawyer and women's rights advocate, complications of infection.

=== 9 ===
- Cocoa Samoa, 61, professional wrestler.
- Dame Joyanne Bracewell, 72, British senior judge of the Family Division of the High Court, breast cancer.
- Ben Callahan, 49, American baseball player (Oakland Athletics).
- Ion Dincă, 78, Romanian Deputy Prime Minister and Mayor of Bucharest during the Communist era.
- Guðmundur Guðmundsson, 86, Icelandic Olympic alpine skier (1948).
- Štefan Harvan, 69, Slovak cross-country skier and Olympian (1964).
- Bahri Ishka, 62, Albanian footballer and coach.
- Maureen Orcutt, 99, American golf champion.
- Yelena Petushkova, 66, Russian equestrian, double medallist at the 1972 Olympics, after long illness.
- Irma St. Paule, 80, Ukrainian-born American actress (Thinner, 12 Monkeys, The Cemetery Club).
- Elmer Symons, 29, South African off-road motorcycle racer, accident during the Dakar Rally.
- Jean-Pierre Vernant, 93, French historian and anthropologist.

=== 10 ===
- Harry Baxter, 85, British soldier.
- Ray Beck, 75, American football player (New York Giants).
- Harry Horse, 46, British cartoonist and children's book author (The Last... series), suicide by stabbing.
- Carlo Ponti, 94, Italian film producer (Doctor Zhivago, La Strada, Marriage Italian Style), Oscar winner (1957), pulmonary complications.
- Sixto Rojas, 24, Paraguayan footballer.
- Bradford Washburn, 96, American cartographer, mountaineer and founder of the Boston Museum of Science, heart failure.

=== 11 ===
- Solveig Dommartin, 45, French actress, trapeze artist in Wim Wenders' Wings of Desire, heart attack.
- Tudor Gates, 77, English screenwriter (Barbarella, Twins of Evil, The Vampire Lovers).
- Bob MacQuarrie, 80, Canadian politician (1981–1985).
- Kéba Mbaye, 82, Senegalese judge, vice president of the International Court of Justice and vice president of the International Olympic Committee.
- Dale Noyd, 73, American Air Force captain and Vietnam War conscientious objector, emphysema.
- Donald Edward Osterbrock, 82, American astronomer, heart attack.
- Bryan Pearce, 77, British painter.
- Robert Anton Wilson, 74, American novelist, futurist and conspiracy theory researcher, post-polio syndrome.

=== 12 ===
- Jimmy Cheatham, 82, American jazz trombonist.
- Alice Coltrane, 69, American jazz musician and widow of John Coltrane, respiratory failure.
- Georg Dahlfelt, 87, Danish footballer.
- Bob Fryday, 78, Canadian ice hockey player (Montreal Canadiens).
- Stephen Gilbert, 96, British painter and sculptor.
- Sir James Killen, 81, Australian Minister for Defence (1975–1982).
- Terrance B. Lettsome, 71, British Virgin Islands politician, illness.
- Olivier Prechac, 58, French Olympic ice hockey player
- Larry Stewart, 58, American philanthropist known in Kansas City as "Secret Santa", esophageal cancer.
- Adolfas Varanauskas, 72, Lithuanian Olympic athlete.

=== 13 ===
- Michael Brecker, 57, American jazz saxophonist, leukemia.
- Sigurd Bröms, 75, Swedish ice hockey player and Olympian (1956, 1960).
- Chalky, 17, British Jack Russell terrier, celebrity pet of Rick Stein.
- Cho Tat-wah, 91, Hong Kong wuxia actor, stomach hemorrhage.
- Doyle Holly, 70, American bassist for Buck Owens' Buckaroos (1963–1971), prostate cancer.
- Henri-Jean Martin, 82, French librarian and book historian, cancer.
- Danny Oakes, 95, American USAC champion midget car driver.
- Augustin Diamacoune Senghor, 78, Senegalese separatist leader.

=== 14 ===
- Gido Babilonia, 40, Filipino basketball player, pulmonary embolism.
- Darlene Conley, 72, American actress (The Bold and the Beautiful, The Young and the Restless, Faces), stomach cancer.
- John Hawkins, 62, Canadian composer.
- Beate Hermelin, 87, German psychologist.
- Barbara Kelly, 82, Canadian-born British actress (What's My Line), cancer.
- Robert Noortman, 60, Dutch art dealer, heart attack.
- Vassilis Photopoulos, 72, Greek art director (Zorba the Greek), Oscar winner (1965).
- Peter Prendergast, 60, Welsh artist.

=== 15 ===
- Awad Hamed al-Bandar, 61, Iraqi former chief judge, execution by hanging.
- Barzan Ibrahim al-Tikriti, 55, Iraqi former leader of the Iraqi Intelligence Service, half-brother of Saddam Hussein, execution by hanging.
- Leonard Berg, 79, American neurologist, creator of the Clinical Dementia Rating scale, stroke.
- Bo Yibo, 98, Chinese politician known for urging crackdown on Tiananmen Square protests of 1989.
- Sir John Boynton, 88, British local government official.
- Bill Brown, 84, American basketball player.
- Colette Caillat, 86, French Sanskrit scholar.
- Isaac Fanous, 87, Egyptian artist and scholar who specialized in Coptic art.
- James Hillier, 91, Canadian-born American inventor of first practical electron microscope, stroke.
- Ardeshir Hosseinpour, 44, Iranian nuclear physicist.
- Bruce Kenrick, 86, British social activist and clergyman.
- Aart Koopmans, 60, Dutch founder of the Alternative Elfstedentocht speed skating series, pneumonia.
- Richard Musgrave, 96, German-born Harvard economist and government adviser, natural causes.
- Percy Saltzman, 91, Canadian meteorologist and television personality, first person to appear on Canadian CBLT Toronto television.
- Colin Thurston, 59, British record producer (Duran Duran, Magazine, The Human League, Kajagoogoo).

=== 16 ===
- Ron Carey, 71, American actor (Barney Miller, History of the World, Part I, The Montefuscos), stroke.
- Giovanni Cocco, 85, Italian Olympic weightlifter (1952).
- Gerald Heffernan, 90, Canadian ice hockey player (Montreal Canadiens).
- Rudolf August Oetker, 90, German food industry magnate (Oetker Group) and philanthropist.
- Benny Parsons, 65, American racecar driver, won 1973 Winston Cup, complications from lung cancer.
- René Riffaud, 108, one of France's last surviving World War I veterans.
- Jainal Antel Sali, Jr., 42, Filipino terrorist and a commander of Abu Sayyaf, shot in an army raid.
- Yuri Stern, 57, Israeli politician, cancer.
- Betty Trezza, 82, American baseball player in the All-American Girls Professional Baseball League, heart attack.
- Gisela Uhlen, 87, German actress.
- David Vanole, 43, American soccer goalkeeper, heart condition.

=== 17 ===
- Ülle Aaskivi, 56, Estonian politician.
- Alice Auma, 50, Ugandan rebel leader and founder of the Holy Spirit Movement.
- Art Buchwald, 81, American humorist and columnist, kidney failure.
- Ralph Henstock, 83, British mathematician.
- Andy Kostecka, 85, American basketball player (Georgetown Hoyas, Indianapolis Jets).
- Yevhen Kushnaryov, 55, Ukrainian politician and a deputy leader of the Party of Regions, shot while hunting.
- Virtue Hampton Whitted, 84, American jazz musician, member of The Hampton Sisters, stroke.

=== 18 ===
- Cyril Baselios, 71, Indian Major Archbishop of the Syro-Malankara Catholic Church, heart attack.
- Julie Winnefred Bertrand, 115, supercentenarian, oldest living Canadian and oldest verified living recognized woman at the time of her death
- Corrie Brown, 57, British Olympic bobsledder (1980, 1984).
- Günther Kruse, 72, Argentine athlete and Olympian (1956).
- Brent Liles, 43, American bassist (Social Distortion, Agent Orange), traffic accident.
- Charles H. O'Brien, 86, American judge, Tennessee Supreme Court (1987–1994).
- Bonaventure Patrick Paul, 77, Pakistani Roman Catholic Bishop of Hyderabad.

=== 19 ===
- Bam Bam Bigelow, 45, American professional wrestler (WWF, ECW, NJPW), drug overdose.
- Fiama Hasse Pais Brandão, 69, Portuguese poet, dramatist, essayist and translator, long illness.
- Gerhard Bronner, 84, Austrian composer and cabaret artist, complications following a stroke.
- Hrant Dink, 52, Armenian-Turkish editor, journalist and columnist, shot.
- Denny Doherty, 66, Canadian singer, abdominal aneurysm.
- Berry Durston, 66, Australian rower and Olympian (1960).
- Danilo Ferrari, 66, Italian cyclist.
- Bill Lefebvre, 91, American baseball pitcher (Boston Red Sox, Washington Senators).
- Murat Nasyrov, 37, Russian pop singer of Uyghur ethnicity, suicide by jumping.

=== 20 ===
- Éric Aubijoux, 42, French motorcycle rider, possible cardiac arrest during Dakar Rally.
- Charles Blakey Blackmar, 84, American jurist (Supreme Court of Missouri).
- Dan Christensen, 64, American abstract painter, heart failure due to polymyositis.
- Brian Eatwell, 67, British production designer (The Man Who Fell to Earth, The Three Musketeers, Walkabout).
- Lloyd Francis, 86, Canadian MP and Speaker of the Canadian House of Commons (1984), stomach cancer.
- Christopher Helm, 69, British publisher and ornithologist.
- Sir David Mostyn, 78, British Army general, Adjutant-General to the Forces (1986–1988).
- Anatol Rapoport, 95, Russian-born American mathematical psychologist and peace activist.
- Alfredo Ripstein, 90, Mexican movie producer, respiratory failure.
- Vern Ruhle, 55, American Major League Baseball pitcher and pitching coach, multiple myeloma.
- George Smathers, 93, American politician, United States Senator (D-FL; 1951–1969), stroke complications.
- Alida de Vries, 92, Dutch women's 4 × 100 m relay runner at the 1936 Summer Olympics.

=== 21 ===
- Maria Cioncan, 29, Romanian runner and Olympian (2004), car accident.
- Peter Clarke, 58, British Children's Commissioner for Wales, cancer.
- Myrtle Devenish, 94, Welsh actress (Time Bandits).
- Richard Ollard, 83, British historian and biographer.
- Peer Raben, 66, German composer, mainly of film music associated with Rainer Werner Fassbinder.
- Barbara Seranella, 50, American author, liver failure.
- U;Nee, 25, Korean pop singer, suicide by hanging.

=== 22 ===
- John Arthur, 60, American philosopher, lung cancer.
- Doug Blasdell, 44, American Bravo television network trainer on Work Out.
- L. M. Boyd, 79, American newspaper columnist for the San Francisco Chronicle.
- Toulo de Graffenried, 92, Swiss Formula One racing driver (1950–1956).
- Victoria Hopper, 97, British stage and film actress.
- Ramón Marsal, 72, Spanish footballer for Real Madrid.
- Michael Nolan, Baron Nolan, 78, English Law Lord and first chairman of the Committee on Standards in Public Life, degenerative illness.
- Elizaphan Ntakirutimana, 83, Rwandan pastor convicted of participation in the Rwandan genocide.
- Abbé Pierre, 94, French founder of the Emmaüs movement, lung infection.

=== 23 ===
- Syed Hussein Alatas, 78, Malaysian academic, writer and Gerakan Party founding president, heart attack.
- Disco D, 26, American hip hop producer, suicide by hanging.
- E. Howard Hunt, 88, American Watergate scandal principal, pneumonia.
- Dick Joyce, 63, American baseball player (Kansas City Athletics).
- Ryszard Kapuściński, 74, Polish journalist, author of book about The Soccer War.
- John Majhor, 53, Canadian and American radio and TV broadcaster, cancer.
- Leopoldo Pirelli, 81, Italian chairman of Pirelli (1965–1996).
- Wally Ridley, 93, English record producer and songwriter.
- David M. Ronne, 63, American sound engineer (On Golden Pond, Silverado, Face/Off).

=== 24 ===
- İsmail Cem, 66, Turkish politician, Minister of Foreign Affairs (1997–2002), lung cancer.
- Jean-François Deniau, 78, French writer and statesman, member of the Académie française.
- Krystyna Feldman, 90, Polish actress, lung cancer.
- Wolfgang Iser, 80, German literary scholar and founder of Reader-response criticism.
- Bryan Kocis, 44, American gay pornography producer, stabbed.
- Guadalupe Larriva, 50, Ecuadorian Defense Minister, helicopter crash.
- John W. Lavelle, 57, American Member of the New York State Assembly, stroke.
- A. H. de Oliveira Marques, 73, Portuguese historian, heart failure.
- Emiliano Mercado del Toro, 115, Puerto Rican WW I veteran, was world's oldest person, natural causes.
- David Morris, 76, British Labour MEP (1984–99) and Chairman of CND Cymru.
- Mendy Samstein, 68, American civil rights activist, organizer for the Student Nonviolent Coordinating Committee, carcinoid cancer.
- Daniel Stern, 79, American University of Houston professor, Warner Bros. and CBS Vice President, heart surgery complications.
- Peter Tompkins, 87, American journalist and writer (The Secret Life of Plants).

=== 25 ===
- Bo Erias, 74, American basketball player (Niagara Purple Eagles, Minneapolis Lakers).
- Ken Kavanaugh, 90, American National Football League player (LSU Tigers, Chicago Bears), complications from pneumonia.
- Majid Khadduri, 97, Iraqi–born American founder of the SAIS Middle East Studies program, failure to thrive.
- Charlotte Thompson Reid, 93, American singer and Republican member of the U.S. House of Representatives.
- Jack Lang, 85, American sportswriter and secretary-treasurer of the Baseball Writers Association (1966–1988).
- Eleanor McGovern, 85, American wife of Senator and Presidential candidate George McGovern.
- Hideo Ogata, 73, Japanese founding editor of Animage, stomach cancer.
- Roberta Semple Salter, 96, American evangelist, daughter of Aimee Semple McPherson and co-creator of Name That Tune.

=== 26 ===
- Charles Brunier, 105, French veteran of WWI and WWII who claimed to have been the inspiration for Papillon.
- Avis M. Dry, 85, British-born clinical psychologist and author on work of Carl Jung.
- Sharon Tyler Herbst, 64, American author of The Food Lover's Companion cookbook, ovarian cancer.
- Irsan Husen, 66, Indonesian Olympic weightlifter (1968).
- Jean Ichbiah, 66, French computer scientist and chief designer of the Ada programming language, brain cancer.
- Max Kelly, 76, Australian mathematics professor and leading researcher into category theory.
- Jimmy Ledgard, 84, British rugby league player for Great Britain, Dewsbury and Leigh.
- Emanuele Luzzati, 85, Italian painter, Oscar-nominated production designer and animator.
- David Grey Rattray, 48, South African historian of the Anglo-Zulu War, shot.
- Glen Tetley, 80, American choreographer and dancer, melanoma.
- Iwuchukwu Amara Tochi, 21, Nigerian convicted of drug trafficking in Singapore, execution by hanging.
- Philip J. Thomas, 85, Canadian folklorist.
- Hans Wegner, 92, Danish furniture designer.
- Gump Worsley, 77, Canadian ice hockey player (New York Rangers, Montreal Canadiens, Minnesota North Stars), heart attack.

=== 27 ===
- Trevor Allan, 80, Australian rugby union player and TV commentator, cancer.
- Tige Andrews, 86, American actor (The Mod Squad, The Detectives, Mister Roberts), cardiac arrest.
- Marcheline Bertrand, 56, American actress, cancer.
- Joe Bretto, 94, American ice hockey player (Chicago Black Hawks).
- Bob Carroll Jr., 88, American television writer (I Love Lucy).
- Paul Channon, 71, British MP for Southend West (1959–1997) and government minister.
- Bing Devine, 90, American general manager of the National League's St. Louis Cardinals baseball team (1958–1964, 1968–1978).
- Claudio Guillén, 82, Spanish writer, member of the Royal Spanish Academy and son of Jorge Guillén, heart attack.
- Arnold Johannessen, 69, Norwegian footballer.
- Kamleshwar, 75, Indian writer and television executive, heart attack.
- Philippe Lacoue-Labarthe, 66, French professor of aesthetics at University of Strasbourg, respiratory insufficiency.
- Herbert Reinecker, 92, German novelist, dramatist and screenwriter (Derrick).
- Yang Chuan-kwang, 73, Taiwanese silver medalist in decathlon at 1960 Summer Olympics, brain hemorrhage.

=== 28 ===
- Uber Baccilieri, 83, Italian Olympic boxer (1948).
- Ivan Boszormenyi-Nagy, 86, Hungarian-American psychiatrist, complications from Parkinson's disease.
- Malcolm Bowie, 63, English scholar of French literature and Master of Christ's College, Cambridge (2002–2006).
- Carlo Clerici, 77, Swiss road racing cyclist who won 1954 Giro d'Italia, cancer.
- Cyril Demarne, 101, British wartime firefighter.
- Robert Drinan, 86, American Democratic Representative and law professor, pneumonia/congestive heart failure.
- Beatrice Hsu, 28, Taiwanese actress, cardiac arrest following car accident.
- Fiona Jones, 49, British politician, Labour MP for Newark (1997–2001), alcoholic liver disease
- Alf Large, 88, Norwegian Olympic bobsledder (1948).
- O. P. Nayyar, 81, Indian music director for Bollywood films, cardiac arrest.
- Deborah Orin, 59, American bureau chief in Washington for the New York Post, cancer.
- Yelena Romanova, 43, Russian track and field athlete, 3000 metres gold medalist at 1992 Summer Olympics.
- Karel Svoboda, 68, Czech composer, suicide by gunshot.
- Emma Tillman, 114, American who was the recognised world's oldest person.
- Johnny Williams, 80, British champion professional boxer in the 1940s and 50s.

=== 29 ===
- Barbaro, 3, American racehorse, 2006 Kentucky Derby winner, euthanized after contracting laminitis.
- José D'Elía, 90, Uruguayan labor leader and politician.
- Dick Wingfield Digby, 95, British Anglican priest, Dean of Peterborough (1966–1980).
- Art Fowler, 84, American Major League Baseball pitcher and pitching coach.
- Robert Meier, 109, German oldest living man, World War I veteran.
- Dan Stoneking, 64, American journalist who was sports editor of the Minneapolis Star and president of the Professional Hockey Writers' Association
- William D. Winston, 74, American politician.

=== 30 ===
- Sir Stephen Berthon, 84, British admiral, cancer.
- Stu Inman, 80, American National Basketball Association executive, heart attack.
- Griffith Jones, 97, British actor.
- Mundo Kemp, 84, Aruban footballer and Olympian (1952).
- Nikos Kourkoulos, 72, Greek actor and artistic director of the National Theatre of Greece, cancer.
- Max Lanier, 91, American baseball player (St. Louis Cardinals, New York Giants, St. Louis Browns).
- Gordon Macklin, 78, American stock broker, NASD President (1970–1987), oversaw NASDAQ start, stroke.
- John Matsudaira, 84, American painter.
- Calvin Plimpton, 88, American president of Amherst College (1960–1971), complications from surgery.
- Sidney Sheldon, 89, American author and TV producer (I Dream of Jeannie), complications from pneumonia.

=== 31 ===
- Kirill Babitzin, 56, Finnish singer, 9th in 1984 Eurovision Song Contest, aortic aneurysm.
- Lee Bergere, 88, American actor (Dynasty).
- Molly Ivins, 62, American newspaper columnist, political commentator and author, breast cancer.
- Mohammed Jamal Khalifa, 49, Saudi brother-in-law of Osama bin Laden, shot.
- Olevi Kull, 51, Estonian ecologist.
- Arben Minga, 47, Albanian football player, pancreatic cancer.
- Ronald Muldrow, 57, American jazz guitarist.
- Douglas T. Ross, 77, American who created APT (programming language) and led MIT CAD project.
- Hokishe Sema, 85, Indian politician, Chief Minister of Nagaland.
- Adelaide Tambo, 77, South African activist and wife of Oliver Tambo.
