= 2007 in association football =

The following are the association football events of the year 2007 throughout the world.

== News ==
=== January ===
- 1 – The 74th traditional new year match between the Koninklijke HFC and the former Dutch international players ends in a 3–1 win for Oranje that won the confrontation for the fourth consecutive time. The Oranje goals were scored by Aron Winter, Rob Witschge and Orlando Trustfull.
- 11 – David Beckham signs a 5-year deal with MLS team Los Angeles Galaxy.
- 20 – The first Argentine major rivalry of the year was played between River Plate and Boca Juniors in Mar del Plata. The match ended in a 2–0 score in favor of River Plate.

=== February ===
- 18 – Season premiers Melbourne Victory win the second A-League football (soccer) grand final at Telstra Dome in Melbourne, Australia beating Adelaide United 6–0, with Victory striker Archie Thompson scoring 5 goals.
- 19 – Reigning League of Ireland champions Shelbourne relegated by the Football Association of Ireland before the start of the new 2007 season.
- 25- Chelsea won the Football League Cup previously known as League Cup after beating Arsenal 2–1 at the Millennium Stadium

=== March ===
- 18 – Hibernian win the Scottish League Cup (Scottish League Cup) final.

=== April ===
- 21 – Lyon become the first club in the "top five" European leagues to win six consecutive Championships after securing the Ligue 1 title with six games to play.
- 22 – Internazionale secure their fifteenth Serie A title after defeating Siena whilst championship rivals Roma lose to Atalanta.
- 22 – Celtic defeat Kilmarnock to retain their Scottish Premier League title.
- 29 – PSV claim the Eredivisie title, their third in a row after the three teams: AZ, Ajax, and PSV had 72 points each. PSV pipped to the title Ajax on goal difference.

=== May ===
- 6 – Defending champions Chelsea lose the English Premiership title to Manchester United after a draw with Arsenal at Emirates Stadium.
- 16 – Sevilla become the first team since 1986 to win two consecutive UEFA Cups after beating Espanyol on penalties at Hampden Park, Scotland.
- 17 – Roma win its eighth Coppa Italia, winning the two final matches with an aggregate result of 7–3 against Internazionale. (6–2 in the first leg played in Rome, 2–1 in the second one in Milan)
- 19 – Chelsea beat Manchester United in the FA Cup Final 2007. Didier Drogba scored an extra time goal to secure a 1–0 victory and a domestic Cup Double for Chelsea.
- 19 – Stuttgart win the 2007 Bundesliga in Germany.
- 23 – Milan win their seventh UEFA Champions League title after beating Liverpool 2-1

=== June ===
- 10 – San Lorenzo de Almagro won their 13th Argentine Primera title beating Arsenal de Sarandí 4–2 at the Nuevo Gasómetro
- 17 – Real Madrid won their 30th Spanish Primera Liga title after defeating Mallorca 3–1 at Santiago Bernabéu Stadium.
- 20 – Boca Juniors won their sixth Copa Libertadores title after defeating Grêmio. They beat the Brazilian side by 3–0 at home and 2–0 at the Estádio Olímpico.
- 24 – USA won their 4th title of CONCACAF Gold Cup beating Mexico 2–1.
- 26 – Poland's Lower Silesia wins the fifth UEFA Regions' Cup, beating Bulgaria's South-East Region 2–1, after extra time, in Sliven.

=== July ===
- 29 – Iraq produced one of football's greatest fairytale victories as the fractured, war-torn nation were crowned champions of the AFC Asian Cup for the first time.

=== August ===
- 5 – Manchester United won the Community Shield for their 16th time (shared 4 times), beating Chelsea 3–0 on penalties after a 1–1 draw.
- 31 – Milan win the 2007 UEFA Super Cup beating Sevilla to claim their 17th international title.

=== December ===
- 2 – Club Atlético Lanús won their first Argentine Primera by obtaining a 1–1 draw against Boca Juniors in the Bombonera.
- 5 – Argentine club Arsenal de Sarandí won the first major title in their history beating Club América of Mexico in the final of Copa Sudamericana 2007.
- 5 – Honduran club Motagua obtained its first international cup in their history beating Saprissa of Costa Rica in the final of Copa Interclubes UNCAF 2007.
- 16 – Milan beat Boca Juniors 4–2 in the 2007 FIFA Club World Cup final to overhaul Boca's world record 17 international titles.

== International tournaments ==
- 2007 CONCACAF Gold Cup in the United States (June 6 – 24 2007)
  - (gold) : United States
  - (silver) : Mexico
  - (bronze) : Canada and Guadeloupe
- 2007 UEFA European Under-21 Football Championship IN Netherlands(June 10 – 23 2007)
  - (gold) : Netherlands
  - (silver) : Serbia
  - (bronze) : England and Belgium
- Copa America 2007 in Venezuela (June 26 – July 15, 2007)
  - (gold) : Brazil
  - (silver) : Argentina
  - (bronze) : Mexico
  - 4th: Uruguay
- 2007 AFF Championship in Singapore and Thailand (January 12 – February 4, 2007)
  - (gold) : Singapore
  - (silver) : Thailand
- 2007 AFC Asian Cup in Indonesia, Malaysia, Thailand, and Vietnam (July 7 – 29 2007)
  - (gold) : Iraq
  - (silver) : Saudi Arabia
  - (bronze) : South Korea
  - 4th: Japan
- 2007 FIFA U-20 World Cup in Canada (June 30 – July 22, 2007)
  - (gold) : Argentina
  - (silver) : Czech Republic
  - (bronze) : Chile
  - 4th: Austria
- 2007 FIFA U-17 World Cup in South Korea (August 18 – September 9, 2007)
  - (gold) : Nigeria
  - (silver) : Spain
  - (bronze) : Germany
  - 4th: Ghana
- 2007 FIFA Women's World Cup in China (September 10 – September 30, 2007)
  - (gold) : Germany
  - (silver) : Brazil
  - (bronze) : United States
  - 4th: Norway

== National champions ==
=== UEFA nations ===
- Albania: KF Tirana
- Andorra: FC Rànger's
- Armenia: FC Pyunik
- Austria: Red Bull Salzburg
- Azerbaijan: Khazar Lenkoran
- Belarus: BATE Borisov
- Belgium: Anderlecht
- Bosnia & Herzegovina: FK Sarajevo
- Bulgaria: Levski Sofia
- Croatia: Dinamo Zagreb
- Cyprus: APOEL
- Czech Republic: Sparta Prague
- Denmark: Copenhagen
- England: Manchester United
- Estonia: Levadia Tallinn
- Faroe Islands: NSÍ
- Finland: Tampere United
- France: Lyon
- Georgia: Olimpi Rustavi
- Germany: Stuttgart
- Greece: Olympiacos
- Hungary: Debreceni VSC
- Iceland: Valur
- Republic of Ireland: Drogheda United
- Israel: Beitar Jerusalem
- Italy: Inter Milan
- Kazakhstan: FC Aktobe
- Latvia: FK Ventspils
- Lithuania: FBK Kaunas
- Luxembourg: F91 Dudelange
- Macedonia: Pobeda
- Malta: Marsaxlokk
- Moldova: Sheriff Tiraspol
- Montenegro: FK Zeta (first First League champions)
- Netherlands: PSV
- Northern Ireland: Linfield
- Norway: SK Brann
- Poland: Zagłębie Lubin
- Portugal: Porto
- Romania: Dinamo București
- Russia: Zenit St. Petersburg
- San Marino: S.S. Murata
- Scotland: Celtic
- Serbia: Red Star Belgrade
- Slovakia: MŠK Žilina
- Slovenia: Domžale
- Spain: Real Madrid
- Sweden: IFK Göteborg
- Switzerland: FC Zürich
- Turkey: Fenerbahçe
- Ukraine: Dynamo Kyiv
- Wales: The New Saints

=== CONMEBOL nations ===
A = Apertura, C = Clausura

- Argentina: San Lorenzo (C), Lanús (A)
- Bolivia: Real Potosí (A), San José (C)
- Brazil: São Paulo
- Chile: Colo-Colo (A & C)
- Colombia: Atlético Nacional (A & C)
- Ecuador: LDU Quito
- Paraguay: Club Libertad
- Peru: Universidad San Martín
- Uruguay: Danubio
- Venezuela: Caracas FC

=== CONCACAF nations ===
A = Apertura, C = Clausura

- Anguilla: Kicks United
- Antigua and Barbuda: Bassa
- Aruba: Deportivo Nacional
- Bahamas:
- Barbados: Barbados Defence Force
- Belize: FC Belize
- Bermuda: Devonshire Cougars
- British Virgin Islands:
- Canada: Toronto Croatia ^{1}
- Cayman Islands: Scholars International
- Cuba: N/A ^{2}
- Costa Rica: Deportivo Saprissa (C)
- Dominica: Sagicor South East United
- Dominican Republic:
- El Salvador: A.D. Isidro Metapán (C), Firpo (A)
- Grenada: ASOMS Paradise
- Guatemala: Xelajú MC (C), Deportivo Jalapa (A)
- Guyana:
- Haiti:
- HON: Real España (C), Marathón (A)
- Jamaica: Harbour View
- Mexico: Pachuca (C), Atlante (A)
- Montserrat:
- Netherlands Antilles: SV Centro SD Barber
- Nicaragua: Real Estelí
- Panama: Tauro (A), San Francisco (C)
- Puerto Rico: Fraigcomar
- Saint Kitts and Nevis: Newtown United
- Saint Lucia: Anse Chastanet GYSO
- Saint Vincent and the Grenadines: Under-20
- Suriname: Inter Moengotapoe
- Trinidad and Tobago: San Juan Jabloteh
- Turks and Caicos Islands: Beaches
- United States: Houston Dynamo (MLS)
- United States Virgin Islands: Helenites

^{1} Excludes Canadian clubs playing in the MLS.

^{2} There was no national champion in Cuba during 2007 as the Campeonato Nacional is in the process of changing from being a summer league to a winter league; the 2006 champion will be followed by a 2007–08 champion.

=== CAF nations ===
- Algeria: ES Sétif
- Angola: Inter Luanda
- Benin: Tonnerre d'Abomey
- Botswana: ECCO City Green
- Burkina Faso: Commune
- Burundi: Vital'O
- Cameroon: Cotonsport Garoua
- Cape Verde: Sporting Praia
- Comoros: Coin Nord
- Republic of the Congo: Diables Noirs
- Ivory Coast: Africa Sports
- Democratic Republic of the Congo: TP Mazembe
- Djibouti: AS Compagnie Djibouti-Ethiopie
- Egypt: Al-Ahly
- Equatorial Guinea: Renacimiento
- Ethiopia: Awassa City
- Gabon: FC 105 Libreville
- Gambia: Real de Banjul
- Ghana: Hearts of Oak
- Guinea: Kaloum Star
- Guinea-Bissau: Sporting de Bissau
- Kenya: Tusker
- Lesotho: Lesotho Correctional Services
- Liberia: Invincible Eleven
- Libya: Al-Ittihad
- Madagascar: Ajesaia
- Mali: Stade Malien
- Mauritania: ASC Nasr de Sebkha
- Mauritius: Curepipe Starlight
- Morocco: Olympique Khouribga
- Mozambique: Costa do Sol
- Namibia: Civics Windhoek
- Niger: Sahel SC
- Nigeria: Enyimba
- Rwanda: APR
- Senegal: AS Douanes
- Seychelles: Saint-Michel United
- Sierra Leone: N/A ^{1}
- Somalia: Elman FC
- South Africa: Mamelodi Sundowns
- Sudan: Al-Hilal Omdurman
- Swaziland: Royal Leopards
- Tanzania: Simba SC
- Togo: ASKO Kara
- Tunisia: Étoile Sahel
- Uganda: Uganda Revenue Authority SC
- Zambia: ZESCO United
- Zimbabwe: Dynamos

^{1} There was no national champion in Sierra Leone during 2007 as the Sierra Leone National Premier League is in the process of changing from being a summer league to a winter league; the 2006 champion will be followed by a 2007–08 champion.

=== AFC nations ===
- Australia: Melbourne Victory
- Bahrain: Muharraq
- Bangladesh: Abahani
- Bhutan: Transport United
- Brunei: No championship held
- China: Changchun Yatai
- Guam: Quality Distributors
- Hong Kong: South China
- India: Dempo SC
- Iran: Saipa
- Iraq: Arbil
- Japan: Kashima Antlers
- Jordan: Al-Wihdat
- Kuwait: Al Kuwait
- Kyrgyzstan: Dordoi-Dynamo Naryn
- Laos: Lao-American College
- Lebanon: Al-Ansar
- Macau: GD Lam Pak
- Malaysia: Kedah FA
- Maldives: New Radiant
- Mongolia: Erchim
- Myanmar: Kanbawza
- Nepal: Mahendra Police Club
- Oman: Al-Nahda
- Oman: Pakistan Army
- Philippines: National Capital Region
- Qatar: Al-Sadd
- Saudi Arabia: Al-Hilal
- Singapore: SAFFC
- South Korea: Pohang Steelers
- Sri Lanka: Ratnam SC
- Syria: Al-Karamah
- Chinese Taipei: Taiwan Power Company
- Tajikistan: Regar-TadAZ Tursunzoda
- Thailand: Chonburi
- Turkmenistan: FC Aşgabat
- United Arab Emirates: Al Wasl
- Uzbekistan: Pakhtakor Tashkent
- Vietnam: Bình Dương
- Yemen: Al-Ahli

=== OFC nations ===
- American Samoa: Konica
- Fiji: Ba
- New Caledonia: JS Baco
- New Zealand: Auckland City
- Northern Mariana Islands: Fiesta Inter Saipan
- Palau: Team Bangladesh
- Papua New Guinea: Cancelled
- Solomon Islands: Kossa
- Tahiti: AS Manu-Ura
- Vanuatu: Tafea

== Notable managerial changes ==
- January 2 – Omiya Ardija appoints Robert Verbeek as their new manager to replace Toshiya Miura.
- February 2 – Huub Stevens leaves Dutch club Roda JC to coach Hamburg. He is replaced in Kerkrade by his assistant Raymond Atteveld.
- February 8 – Sparta Rotterdam names Danny Blind as their new technical director for the new season. Gert Aandewiel comes over from HFC Haarlem to replace Wiljan Vloet as the new manager of the Dutch club.
- February 15 – Dutch club FC Emmen sacks manager Jan van Dijk.
- February 17 – Manager and former international Gerald Vanenburg is sacked by Helmond Sport due to a lack of confidence, the club reports on its website.
- April 10 – Fulham FC sack Chris Coleman to be replaced by Northern Ireland international manager Laurie Sanchez
- April 29 – Sam Allardyce resigns as manager of Bolton Wanderers after eight years at the club. He then takes over at Newcastle United F.C and his previous job is taken by Sammy Lee.
- May 14 – Paul Jewell resigns as Wigan Athletic manager.
- May 14 – Stuart Pearce gets sacked by Manchester City
- May 16 – Neil Warnock resigns Sheffield United job and get replaced by Bryan Robson
- June 4 – Claudio Ranieri signs as Juventus manager.
- September 20 – José Mourinho sacked as Chelsea manager
- October 22 – Greg Ryan sacked as head coach of the USA women's national team, despite 45 wins and only one loss out of 55 matches in charge. The loss, however, was a 4–0 humiliation by Brazil in the semifinals of the 2007 FIFA Women's World Cup, the worst loss in USA women's history. Ryan was also embroiled in controversy regarding his decision to bench goalkeeper Hope Solo, who had not allowed a goal in the previous three games, in favour of veteran Briana Scurry.
- October 23 – Steve Staunton sacked as Republic of Ireland head coach.
- November 8 – Ruud Gullit is signed to a three-year deal with Los Angeles Galaxy.
- November 22 – Steve McLaren sacked as England head coach.

== Births ==
- March 16 – Harry Amass, English professional footballer
- July 13 – Lamine Yamal, Spanish professional footballer
- September 12 – Kim Hyeon-oh, South Korean footballer
- September 27 – Gabriano Shelton, international footballer

== Deaths ==
=== January ===
- January 1 – Thierry Bacconnier (43), French footballer
- January 1 – Jørgen Hammeken (88), Danish footballer
- January 3 – Roland Ehrhardt (65), French footballer
- January 4 – Sandro Salvadore (67), Italian footballer
- January 6 – Juan Manuel Alejandrez (62), Mexican footballer
- January 12 – Georg Dahlfelt (87), Danish footballer
- January 12 – Roberto Mazzanti (64), Italian footballer
- January 15 – David Vanole (43), American soccer player
- January 22 – Ramón Marsal (72), Spanish footballer
- January 30 – Sixto Rojas (26), Paraguayan footballer
- January 30 – Sigifredo Mercado (73), Mexican footballer
- January 31 – Arben Minga (47), Albanian footballer

=== February ===
- February 4 – José Carlos Bauer, Brazilian defender, runner-up at the 1950 FIFA World Cup. (81)
- February 12 – Georg Buschner, German football player and manager. (81)

=== March ===
- March 1 – Fernando Veneranda, Italian footballer and coach
- March 19 – Menotti Avanzolini, Italian footballer

=== April ===
- April 7 – Marià Gonzalvo (85), Spanish footballer
- April 25 – Alan Ball (61), English footballer

=== May ===
- May 2 – Juan Valdivieso (96), Peruvian footballer
- May 4 – José Antonio Roca (78), Mexican footballer and coach
- May 12 – Edy Vasquez (23), Honduran footballer
- May 13 – Kai Johansen (66), Danish footballer
- May 26 – Marek Krejčí (26), Slovak footballer

=== June ===
- June 13 – Néstor Rossi (82), Argentine footballer and coach
- June 13 – Hussein Dokmak (28) and Hussein Naeem (20), two Lebanese footballers who played for Nejmeh SC died in a car bomb in Beirut
- June 24 – Derek Dougan (69), Northern Irish footballer
- June 26 – Jupp Derwall (80), German footballer and coach

=== July ===
- July 2 – Luigi Scarabello (91), Italian footballer and coach
- July 9 – Esteban Areta (75), Spanish footballer and coach
- July 24 – Raimundo Pérez Lezama (84), Spanish footballer
- July 25 – Bernd Jakubowski (54), German footballer
- July 27 – Giuseppe Baldo (93), Italian footballer

=== August ===
- August 20 – Anton Reid (16), English footballer
- August 25 – Ray Jones (18), English footballer
- August 28 – Antonio Puerta (22), Spanish footballer
- August 29 – Chaswe Nsofwa (28), Zambian footballer

=== September ===
- September 3 – Gustavo Eberto (24), Argentine footballer
- September 9 – Helmut Senekowitsch (73), Austrian footballer and coach
- September 11 – Ian Porterfield (61), Scottish footballer
- September 14 – Ambrogio Valadè (70), Italian footballer
- September 22 – Nílton Coelho da Costa, Brazilian striker, winner of the Panamerican Championship 1956. (79)
- September 27 – Bill Perry (77), South African footballer
- September 27 – Horst Podlasly (71), German footballer

=== October ===
- October 8 – Fulvio Zuccheri (48), Italian footballer
- October 26 – Nicolae Dobrin (60), Romanian footballer

=== November ===
- November 5 – Nils Liedholm (85), Swedish footballer and coach
- November 13 – John Doherty (footballer) (72), English footballer
- November 23 – Óscar Carmelo Sánchez (36), Bolivian footballer
- November 26 – Manuel Badenes (78), Spanish footballer

=== December ===
- December 29 – Phil O'Donnell (35), Scottish footballer
