= Slotkin =

Slotkin is a surname. Notable people with the surname include:

- Deborah Orin (1947–2007), American journalist, née Slotkin
- Elissa Slotkin (born 1976), American politician
- Richard Slotkin (born 1942), American historian
- Stanley Slotkin (1905–1997), American businessman
