= David L. Brody =

American neurologist

David Lozoff Brody
- Born: February 25, 1970 (age 56); San Diego, California
- Occupations: Neurologist, academic and author

Academic background
- Education: BA., Biological Sciences; PhD., Biomedical Engineering
- Alma mater: Stanford University; Johns Hopkins School of Medicine

Academic work
- Institutions: Washington University in St. Louis; Uniformed Services University of the Health Sciences; Walter Reed National Military Medical Center

David Lozoff Brody (born February 25, 1970) is an American neurologist, academic, and author most known for his research on the clinical treatment of traumatic brain injury (TBI) and neurodegenerative diseases in civilian and military personnel. He is a Clinical Neurologist at the Walter Reed National Military Medical Center and a professor of Neurology at Uniformed Services University of the Health Sciences, as well as a professor of Neurology and Biomedical Engineering at Washington University in St. Louis.

Brody's work has resulted in numerous research papers and patents, along with a book entitled Concussion Care Manual. He has received multiple awards including the Hans Prohaska Young Investigator Award at the Johns Hopkins School of Medicine, the Leonard Berg Prize for Research Conducted During Residency at Washington University, a Medical Student Teaching Award at Washington University, a Mentored Clinical Scientist Development Award from the National Institute of Neurological Disorders and Stroke (NINDS) (2004–2009), a Burroughs Wellcome Career Award in the Biomedical Sciences (2005–2010), two Department of Defense grants (2008–2013), a National Institutes of Health (NIH) R01 Award (2009–2018), a Washington University School of Medicine Distinguished Investigator Award (2012), a Star Research Achievement Award from the Society of Critical Care Medicine (2016) and an American Neurological Association Raymond Adams Lectureship Award (2018).

Brody is a Physician-Scientist Member of the American Society for Clinical Investigation, a Scientific Advisory Board Member of the International Neurotrauma Society, an Ex-Officio Council Member of the National Neurotrauma Society, and also serves as the Editor-in-Chief of the Journal of Neurotrauma.

== Education and early career ==
Brody earned a BA in Biological Sciences from Stanford University in 1992 and became the United States Fencing Association National Champion for Division 2 in Men's Épée. In 2000, he received a PhD in Biomedical Engineering from the Johns Hopkins School of Medicine as part of the Medical Scientist Training Program under David T. Yue. Following this, he completed his postdoctoral training with an internship and neurology residency at the Barnes Jewish Hospital and Washington University in St. Louis. Subsequently, he worked as a part-time Emergency Room Physician at the Metropolitan St. Louis Psychiatric Center from 2002 to 2004 and conducted post-doctoral research in David Holtzman’s laboratory from 2004 to 2006.

== Career ==
Brody continued his academic career as an instructor in neurology at Washington University School of Medicine from 2004 to 2006, later becoming assistant professor in 2007, Associate Professor in 2012, and was appointed the Norman J. Stupp Endowed Professor of Neurology at Washington University in 2016. Concurrently, he worked as a Clinical Neurologist at the Rehabilitation Institute of St. Louis and held the position of the Washington University Site Leader for the National Football League (NFL) Player Care Plan, providing clinical neurological care to retired NFL players from 2008 to 2017. In 2017, he joined the Uniformed Services University of the Health Sciences, directing the Center for Neuroscience and Regenerative Medicine until 2022, while also working as an NIH NINDS Clinical Collaborator. He serves as a Clinical Neurologist at the Walter Reed National Military Medical Center and holds professorships in Neurology at both the Uniformed Services University of the Health Sciences and Washington University.

Brody formerly led a team that collaborated with U.S. Department of Defense (DoD) researchers at the Landstuhl Regional Medical Center in Germany and two locations in Afghanistan, focusing on the treatment of U.S. military personnel with TBIs. In 2011, he acted as a Consultant to the medical advisor of the Chairman of the Joint Chiefs of Staff. At the invitation of Admiral Michael Mullen, then-Chairman of the Joint Chiefs of Staff, he traveled to Afghanistan with the Gray Team, a group of civilian and military experts assessing the state of TBIs among troops in the combat zone.

== Research ==
Brody's research focuses on improving the diagnosis, treatment, and outcomes of traumatic brain injury (TBI) in both civilian and military populations. Together with colleagues, he discussed the need for a new multidimensional classification system for TBI to improve the linkage between specific brain injury patterns and appropriate therapeutic interventions, proposing the use of advanced MRI, blood tests for axonal proteins, and PET for tau pathology to better understand and diagnose chronic traumatic encephalopathy (CTE) and its prevention. He has developed and authenticated advanced imaging technologies to detect brain white matter injuries and was the first to predict neurological function by measuring amyloid, an abnormal brain protein. Additionally, he contributed to the discovery that diffusion tensor imaging (DTI), an advanced MRI technique, can identify blast-related damage, and the project was featured by Congressionally Directed Medical Research Programs (CDMRP). He further validated DTI as a more sensitive method than conventional MRI for detecting traumatic axonal injury (TAI) in a mouse model, finding that DTI parameters correlate well with histological changes and can predict the time since trauma.

In a study published in Science, Brody revealed that brain interstitial fluid (ISF) amyloid-β (Aβ) concentrations correlate with neurological status and neuronal function, suggesting that neuronal activity regulates extracellular Aβ levels in humans. Investigating how TBI affects Aβ and tau pathologies in a mouse model of Alzheimer's disease, he showed that TBI accelerates Aβ accumulation but does not alter tau pathology, highlighting independent effects on these biomarkers. He also reviewed the initial successes and safety issues of Aβ vaccination for Alzheimer's, highlighting its discontinuation due to meningoencephalitis in 6% of subjects, and later developed a highly sensitive assay for detecting soluble Aβ oligomers, which indicated that their levels are strongly correlated with Alzheimer's disease dementia and provide better distinction between demented and non-demented patients than plaque measures alone.

In 2019, Brody published the second edition of his book Concussion Care Manual: A Practical Guide, discussing the diagnosis and treatment of complex concussions, addressing symptoms, patient demographics, and the setup and management of a concussion clinic. In a review for Neurosurgery, Jamshid Ghajar remarked, "This pocket-sized paper back coming in at 240 pages is a gem for concussion practitioners new and old. Easy to read and a practical guide for diagnosing and treating acute and chronic postconcussion disorders."

== Awards and honors ==
- 2009-2018 – R01 Award, National Institutes of Health
- 2012 – Distinguished Investigator Award, Washington University School of Medicine
- 2012 – Member, American Society for Clinical Investigation
- 2016 – Star Research Achievement Award, Society of Critical Care Medicine
- 2018 – Raymond Adams Lectureship Award, American Neurological Association

== Bibliography ==
=== Books ===
- Concussion Care Manual: A Practical Guide (2019) ISBN 978-0190054793

=== Selected articles ===
- Mac Donald, C. L., Dikranian, K., Bayly, P., Holtzman, D., & Brody, D. (2007). Diffusion tensor imaging reliably detects experimental traumatic axonal injury and indicates approximate time of injury. Journal of Neuroscience, 27(44), 11869–11876.
- Saatman, K. E., Duhaime, A. C., Bullock, R., Maas, A. I., Valadka, A., & Manley, G. T. (2008). Classification of traumatic brain injury for targeted therapies. Journal of neurotrauma, 25(7), 719–738.
- Mac Donald, C. L., Johnson, A. M., Cooper, D., Nelson, E. C., Werner, N. J., Shimony, J. S., ... & Brody, D. L. (2011). Detection of blast-related traumatic brain injury in US military personnel. New England journal of medicine, 364(22), 2091–2100.
- Esparza, T. J., Zhao, H., Cirrito, J. R., Cairns, N. J., Bateman, R. J., Holtzman, D. M., & Brody, D. L. (2013). Amyloid‐beta oligomerization in Alzheimer dementia versus high‐pathology controls. Annals of neurology, 73(1), 104–119.
- Blennow, K., Brody, D. L., Kochanek, P. M., Levin, H., McKee, A., Ribbers, G. M., ... & Zetterberg, H. (2016). Traumatic brain injuries. Nature reviews Disease primers, 2(1), 1–19.
