= On a Clear Day You Can See Forever =

1965 musical

- Original Broadway Playbill cover
- Music: Burton Lane
- Lyrics: Alan Jay Lerner
- Book: Alan Jay Lerner
- Productions: 1965 Broadway; 2000 London; 2011 Broadway Revival; 2013 London Revival

On a Clear Day You Can See Forever is a musical with music by Burton Lane and a book and lyrics by Alan Jay Lerner based loosely on the play Berkeley Square, written in 1926 by John L. Balderston. It concerns a woman who has ESP and has been reincarnated. The musical received three Tony Award nominations. It was adapted into a movie in 1970.

== Productions ==
The Broadway production opened at the Mark Hellinger Theatre on October 17, 1965, and closed on June 11, 1966, after 280 performances and 3 previews. The production was directed by Robert Lewis, choreographed by Herbert Ross, and starred Barbara Harris as Daisy Gamble/Melinda, John Cullum as Dr. Mark Bruckner, Clifford David as Edward Moncrief, Titos Vandis as Themistocles Kriakos, and William Daniels (Harris's co-star in A Thousand Clowns) as Warren Smith. Louis Jourdan was the original leading man when the show had its tryout at the Colonial Theatre in Boston but was replaced by Cullum before it reached Broadway. Scenic design was by Oliver Smith and costume design was by Freddy Wittop.

The show was not well received. Ben Brantley of The New York Times recalled: "Its book was strained and muddled, most critics agreed; its big production numbers were simply cumbersome. But it did have [a] lushly melodic score...." Tours followed, starring such diverse actress-singers as Tammy Grimes, Linda Lavin, and Nancy Dussault as Daisy/Melinda.

The New York Times reported that the show was budgeted at $600,000, with NBC supplying $150,000 and RCA $60,000. Operating cost per week was said to be $55,000-60,000 at a time when a big musical’s typical weekly cost was about $45,000.

A 1970 film adaptation directed by Vincente Minnelli starred Barbra Streisand, Yves Montand, Bob Newhart and Jack Nicholson.

In February 2000, the New York City Center Encores! series presented a staged concert starring Kristin Chenoweth as Daisy/Melinda and Peter Friedman as Dr. Bruckner. The show premiered in London in 2000 at the Bridewell Theatre.

A revised Broadway production began previews on November 12, 2011, at the St. James Theatre and opened on December 11, 2011, directed by Michael Mayer and with a new book by Peter Parnell. Harry Connick Jr. starred as Dr. Mark Bruckner. The cast included Jessie Mueller as Melinda and David Turner as David Gamble. The revised version, which had a developmental workshop at The Vineyard Theatre in the fall of 2009 and had readings in August 2010 at the Powerhouse Theater at Vassar College, departed from the plot of the original. The patient is now a gay florist David (Turner) who was a female jazz singer Melinda (Mueller) in a former life, and who falls in love with his psychiatrist, widower Dr. Mark Bruckner (Connick). The Vassar concert mixed "material from the stage and film versions and eliminates overstuffed 1960s-style production numbers." This production closed on January 29, 2012, after 29 previews and 57 performances.

On A Clear Day You Can See Forever was revived at the Union Theatre in London starring Vicki Lee Taylor as Daisy Gamble and Nadeem Crowe as Dr. Mark Bruckner. The production was directed by Kirk Jameson and opened to rave reviews with the run ending on 28 September 2013.

The 2011 revised Broadway version was revived at The New Conservatory Theater Center in San Francisco, California starring Chris Morell as David Gamble, Melissa O'Keefe as Melinda Wells, and popular local actor William Giammona as Dr. Mark Bruckner. The production was directed by Artistic director and founder, Ed Decker, with musical direction by Matthew Lee Cannon, choreography by Jayne Zaban and new instrumental arrangements by Ben Prince. It opened May 21, 2016.

Porchlight Music Theatre presented this show as a part of their "Porchlight Revisits" season where they stage three forgotten musicals per year. This production was performed in Chicago, Illinois in May 2017. It was directed by Lili-Anne Brown.

Tony Award-nominee Melissa Errico starred in a 2018 Off-Broadway revival in New York City with Irish Repertory Theatre; she also wrote about the musical in an inquiry about gender politics in theater for The New York Times that summer.

== Synopsis ==
Act I

Quirky Daisy Gamble sees herself as an unremarkable person and has low self-esteem, even though she can (1) make plants grow remarkably, (2) predict when a telephone will ring or someone will drop in, and (3) tell where to find an object that someone else is looking for. Her current problem, though, is her nasty smoking habit, which will interfere with the chances of her fiancé, Warren, for a job with great benefits. She seeks help from a psychiatrist, Dr. Mark Bruckner, to stop smoking. When he hypnotizes her, she describes living a previous life in late 18th century England as "Melinda Wells", who died in her late twenties from circumstances beyond her control. Free spirited Melinda was in love with portrait painter Edward Moncrief. Mark keeps to himself what Daisy has revealed to him, and he tells her that she should not be ashamed of her ESP.

At their next session, Daisy, under hypnosis, relates scenes from the salacious London Hellrakers' Club where Melinda met Edward. Melinda and Edward eventually marry, but the painter is unfaithful to her, having sex with his subjects. Mark finds himself falling for "Melinda" and becomes convinced that Daisy is really the reincarnation of Melinda. Melinda finally leaves Edward and sets sail for America, but the ship never reaches Boston. Before Mark can save Melinda from shipwreck, Daisy wakes up.

Act II

Mark reports on the case to his fellow psychiatrists, who ridicule his findings. Greek shipping magnate Themistocles Kriakos learns of Mark's belief in reincarnation and offers to finance a study of the events of Melinda's life in exchange for Mark's help in discovering who he will be in his next life, which will allow him to leave his fortune to his future self. Daisy accidentally discovers that she is the "Melinda" at the center of the growing controversy and that Mark prefers Melinda to herself. In her angry confrontation with the psychiatrist about the matter, she tells him that she is "through being a go-between for you and your dream girl. You're not going to go on using my head for a motel."

Daisy goes to the airport, ready to return home. Her ESP powers warn her that the plane on which she plans to travel will crash. She realizes at last how special she really is. She leaves her starchy fiancé and she and Mark unite to explore their extraordinary future.

== Versions ==
The musical is available in at least two noticeably different published versions (aside from the film version), although the basic plot-line remains the same. The first version was published in 1966. The musical numbers recorded in the original Broadway cast album of 1965 correspond to this version.

A second version is evident in the piano-vocal score published in 1967. Here several vocal numbers from the above version are missing ("Ring Out the Bells," "Tosy and Cosh", "Don't Tamper with my Sister"), as is the introduction to the song "Hurry, It's Lovely Up Here," which is recorded on the cast album. Also, the Greek millionaire's solo, "When I'm Being Born Again" is given completely different lyrics ("When I Come Around Again") and sung instead by Daisy's friends. The overture recorded on the cast album combines the "overture" and "entr'acte" printed in the vocal score.

The 1970 film version departed from the musical significantly, adding a character for Jack Nicholson (an ex-stepbrother named Tad Pringle), and changing details of other characters, moving the period of Melinda's life ahead by a decade or two (into the early 19th century), removing several songs, changing lyrics and adding two new songs.

== Songs ==
=== 1965 Broadway version ===
Act I

- "Overture"
- "Hurry! It's Lovely Up Here!" — Daisy Gamble
- "Ring Out the Bells" — Samuel Welles, Mrs. Welles, Sir Hubert Insdale and Servants
- "Tosy and Cosh" — Daisy
- "On a Clear Day (You Can See Forever)" — Dr. Mark Bruckner
- "On the S.S. Bernard Cohn" — Daisy, Muriel Bunson, James Preston and Millard Cross
- "At the Hellrakers" (Ballet)
- "Don't Tamper with My Sister" — Edward Moncrief, Sir Hubert and Ensemble
- "She Wasn't You" — Edward
- "Melinda" — Dr. Bruckner

Act II

- "When I'm Being Born Again" — Themistocles Kriakos
- "What Did I Have That I Don't Have?" — Daisy
- "Wait Till We're Sixty-Five" — Warren Smith and Daisy
- "Come Back to Me" — Dr. Bruckner
- "Come Back to Me (reprise)" — Dr. Bruckner
- "On a Clear Day (You Can See Forever) (Reprise)" — Ensemble

=== 1967 Revised version ===
Act I

- "Overture"
- "Hurry! It's Lovely Up Here!" — Daisy Gamble
- "First Regression: She Wasn't You
- "Solicitor's Song" — Samuel Welles, Mrs. Welles, Sir Hubert Insdale and Servants
- "He Wasn't You" — Daisy
- "On a Clear Day (You Can See Forever)" — Dr. Mark Bruckner
- "The Gout"
- "On the S.S. Bernard Cohn" — Daisy, Muriel Bunson, James Preston and Millard Cross
- "She Wasn't You" — Edward
- "Melinda" — Dr. Bruckner

Act II

- "Entre´acte"
- "When I Come Around Again" — Muriel, Preston and Students
- "What Did I Have That I Don't Have?" — Daisy
- "Wait Till We're Sixty-Five" — Warren Smith and Daisy
- "Come Back to Me" — Dr. Bruckner
- "Come Back to Me (reprise)" — Dr. Bruckner
- "On a Clear Day (You Can See Forever) (Reprise)" — Ensemble

=== 2011 Broadway revival version ===
Act I

- "Overture"
- "Hurry! It's Lovely Up Here" – David
- "She Isn't You" – Mark
- "Open Your Eyes" † – Club Singer
- "Open Your Eyes (Reprise) I" † – Melinda
- "Hurry! It's Lovely Up Here (Reprise)" – David
- "Wait 'til We're Sixty-Five" – Warren, David, Muriel, Alan, Hannah, Paula, Preston, Roger
- "Wait 'til We're Sixty-Five (Reprise)" – Warren
- "You're All the World to Me" † – Melinda, Mark, David
- "Who Is There Among Us Who Knows" – Mark, Sharone
- "Who Is There Among Us Who Knows (Reprise)" – Mark, Melinda
- "On the S.S. Bernard Cohn" – Mark, David, Muriel, Alan, Hannah, Paula, Preston, Roger
- "Love with All the Trimmings" – Warren
- "Open Your Eyes (Reprise) II" † – Mark, Sharone, Muriel, Mrs. Hatch, Kravis, Cynthia, Alan, Hannah, Paula, Preston, Roger
- "Melinda" – Mark, Melinda, David

Act II

- "Entr' Acte"
- "Go to Sleep" — Added during previews, not credited in the Playbill – Muriel, David
- "Ev'ry Night at Seven" † – Melinda, Radio Singers
- "Too Late Now" † – Mark, Melinda
- "Love with All the Trimmings (Reprise)" – Warren
- "When I'm Being Born Again" – Muriel, Mark, Hannah, Paula, Preston, Roger
- "(S)he Wasn't You" – Sharone, Warren, David, Mark
- "What Did I Have That I Don't Have?" – David
- "Come Back to Me" – Mark, Warren
- "Too Late Now (Reprise)" † – Mark, Melinda
- "On a Clear Day (You Can See Forever)" – Mark
- "Finale" – Full Company

† Songs taken from the musical film Royal Wedding.

Note: In the piano-vocal score, a song appears that was not included in the original Broadway production: "The Solicitor's Song", during Daisy's first regression-scene. There was also a ballet in the first act of the original production, entitled "At the Hellrakers" and the song "Ring Out the Bells" that are not found on the original Broadway recording.

== Casts ==
Character	Broadway	Encores!	Broadway Revival
Character	1965	2000	2011
Daisy/David Gamble	Barbara Harris	Kristin Chenoweth	David Turner
Melinda	Barbara Harris	Kristin Chenoweth	Jessie Mueller
Dr. Mark Brucker	John Cullum	Peter Friedman	Harry Connick Jr.
Warren Smith	William Daniels	Roger Bart	Drew Gehling
Muriel Bunson	Barbara Monte	Darice Roberts	Sarah Stiles
Dr. Sharone Stein	–	–	Kerry O'Malley
Mrs. Hatch	Rae Allen	Nancy Opel	Lori Wilner
James Preston	William Reilly	Brooks Ashmanskas	Benjamin Eakeley
Sir Hubert Insdale	Byron Webster	Ed Dixon	–
Edward Moncrief	Clifford David	Brent Barrett	–
Dr. Conrad Bruckner	Byron Webster	Ed Dixon	–
Evans Bologard	Hamilton Camp	Bryan T. Donovan	–
Millard Cross	Paul Reid Roman	Jim Newman	–
Thermistocles Kriakos	Titos Vandis	Louis Zorich	–

As the Original Broadway Cast and the 2011 Revival are vastly different, there are many characters that do not cross over between both versions of the musical.

== Recordings ==
The title song, first introduced by John Cullum in the 1965 musical, has been recorded by a number of artists, including Robert Goulet, Johnny Mathis, baseball pitcher Denny McLain, and Sergio Franchi on his 1976 albums TeleHouse Presents - Sergio Franchi (TeleHouse Records) and 20 Magificent Songs (DynaHouse Records); Barbra Streisand, star of the 1970 film version, recorded the title song on the film's soundtrack and has frequently included it in her concerts. Sammy Davis Jr. performed the title song live in concert, and Harry James also released a version in 1967 on his album Our Leader! (Dot DLP 3801 and DLP 25801). In 2012, The Peddlers' 1968 jazz cover was used in season 5 episode 3 ("Hazard Pay") of AMC-TV's Breaking Bad over a montage of Walter White (Bryan Cranston) and Jesse Pinkman's (Aaron Paul) meth manufacturing.

"What Did I Have That I Don't Have" was covered with some success by Eydie Gorme and was also sung by Streisand on the soundtrack of the film version. "Come Back to Me" was recorded by swing revival band the Cherry Poppin' Daddies in 1994, which later appeared on their multi-platinum 1997 compilation Zoot Suit Riot and was re-recorded for their 2014 Rat Pack tribute Please Return the Evening.

The title song is reminiscent of Maurice Ravel's "Dawn" movement from his ballet Daphnis et Chloé.

== Awards and nominations ==
=== Original Broadway production ===
Year	Award	Category	Nominee	Result
1966	Tony Award	Best Performance by a Leading Actor in a Musical	John Cullum	Nominated
1966	Tony Award	Best Performance by a Leading Actress in a Musical	Barbara Harris	Nominated
1966	Tony Award	Best Original Score	Burton Lane and Alan Jay Lerner	Nominated
1966	Theatre World Award		John Cullum	Won

=== 2011 Broadway revival ===
Year	Award	Category	Nominee	Result
2012	Tony Award	Best Performance by a Featured Actress in a Musical	Jessie Mueller	Nominated
2012	Drama Desk Award	Outstanding Featured Actress in a Musical	Jessie Mueller	Nominated
