= Brian Hill (chef) =

American chef and television personality

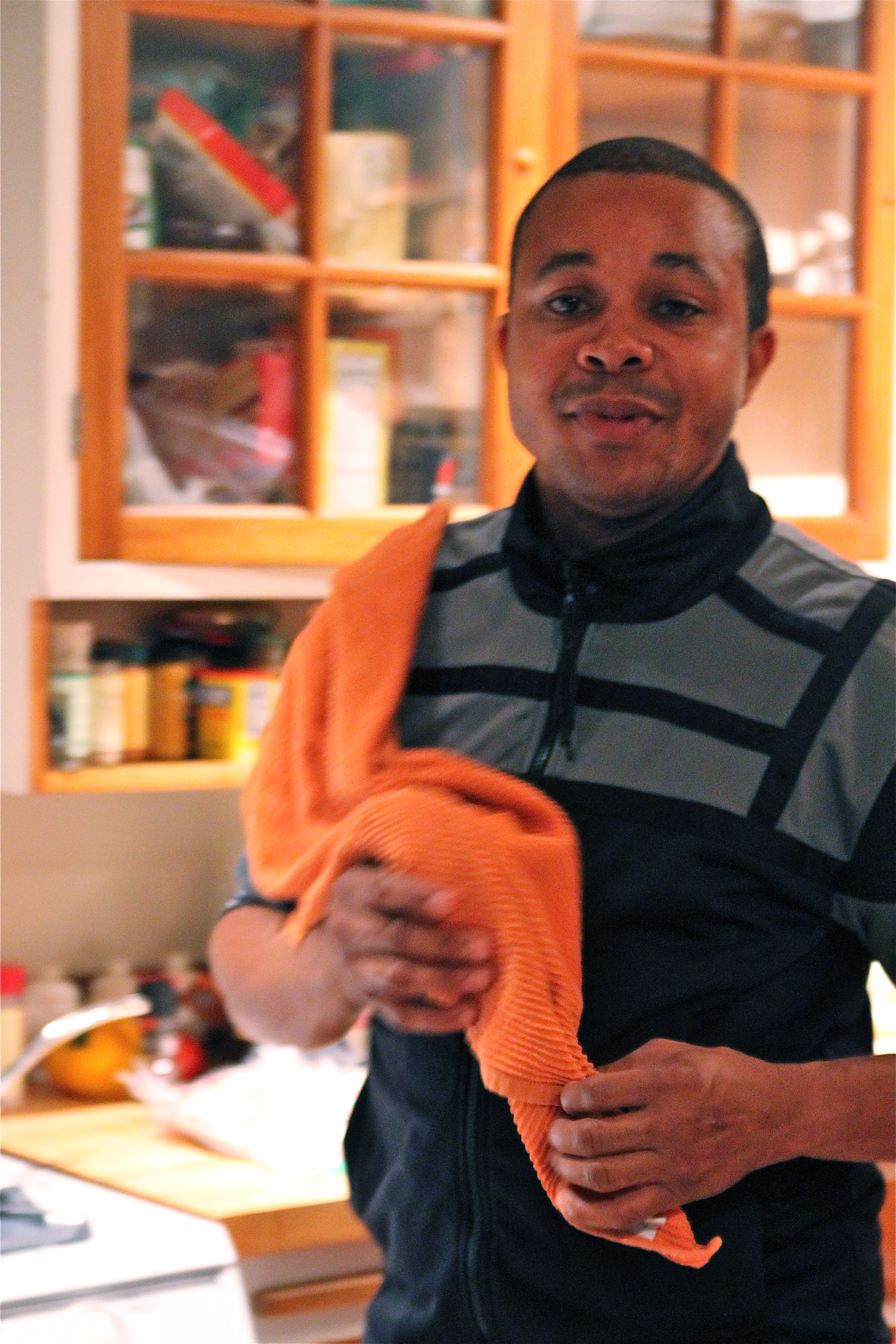
- Born: Washington, D.C.
- Education: Self-trained
- Culinary career
- Current restaurants
- Chef Brian's Comfort Kitchen (Tucson, Arizona)
- Television shows
- Top Chef; Private Chefs of Beverly Hills
- Website: chefbrianat350degrees.com

Brian Hill is an American chef who was a contestant on the first season of the television show Top Chef. He has appeared on Bar Rescue, and Hill was one of the six regular chefs in the Food Network reality show Private Chefs of Beverly Hills. In March 2010, he launched the Comfort Truck in Los Angeles, California. He opened Chef Brian's Comfort Kitchen in Tucson, Arizona in December 2022.
