= Thintervention with Jackie Warner =

- Genre: Reality television
- Starring: Jackie Warner
- Country of origin: United States
- Original language: English
- No. of seasons: 1
- No. of episodes: 8

Production
- Executive producers: Jackie Warner; Jennifer O'Connell; Michaline Babich; Nick Emmerson
- Production company: Shed Media

Original release
- Network: Bravo
- Release: September 6 – October 25, 2010

Thintervention with Jackie Warner is an American reality television series that premiered on September 6, 2010, on Bravo. The first season averaged 810,000 viewers. The show did not return for a second season.

== Premise ==
The series encompasses Jackie Warner as she assists struggling clients to lose weight and live a healthy lifestyle. Instead of operating a typical boot-camp type program, Warner works with the clients in their environments where the clients are exposed to everyday stresses and triggers to eat unhealthy. Each week, all the members gather for group therapy and weekly weigh-in.

== Cast ==
Name	Age	Hometown	Weight loss goal
Stacy Citron	23	Los Angeles, CA	50 pounds
Bryan T. Donovan	36	Los Angeles, CA	60 pounds
Mandy Ellen	48	Calabasas, CA	30 pounds
Jeana Keough	54	Orange County, CA	25 pounds
Joe Moller	35	Los Angeles, CA	40 pounds
Kim Smith	47	Valencia, CA	30 pounds
Shannon "Shay" Smith	23	Valencia, CA	50 pounds
Nikki Wood	39	Los Angeles, CA	50 pounds

== Episodes ==
No.	Title	Original release date	US viewers (millions)
1	"Experience Thintervention"	September 6, 2010	1.15
2	"Uphill Battle"	September 13, 2010	0.45
3	"The Fat & the Furious"	September 20, 2010	0.42
4	"Chase the Burn"	September 27, 2010	N/A
5	"Big Fat Liar"	October 4, 2010	N/A
6	"Sweat Is Sexy"	October 11, 2010	0.83
7	"Sink or Swim"	October 18, 2010	0.77
8	"The Final Weigh-in"	October 25, 2010	1.13
