= Doug Blasdell =

American broadcaster (1962–2007)

- Born: Douglas C. Blasdell; December 14, 1962; Burbank, California
- Died: January 22, 2007 (aged 44); Beverly Hills, California
- Occupations: Personal trainer, Reality show participant
- Notable credit: Work Out (Bravo Network)

Doug Blasdell (December 14, 1962 – January 22, 2007) was an American trainer and reality show personality who appeared on Bravo's reality TV series Work Out. He was the oldest trainer on the series.

== Biography ==
Born Douglas C. Blasdell to Donald Milton "Skip" Blasdell and Deanna Lou (Savage) Blasdell. One sister, Sandra, a year older.

According to an interview on AfterEllen.com, Blasdell was born at St. Joseph's hospital in Burbank, California. Doug attended school in Arbuckle, California, from junior high through high school. The Los Angeles native earned a business degree in 1988 at the University of Southern California and was the first in his family to graduate from college. While at USC, Doug was a brother of Sigma Pi fraternity.

Blasdell's interest in health and fitness flourished from a young age. He grew his business as a personal trainer and became one of Hollywood, California's sought-after trainers and spin instructors. He carried his experience in personal fitness into the reality TV world with Bravo's program “Work Out”.

The Douglas Blasdell Outreach Program, hosted by the Los Angeles City College Foundation (LACC), will help to support student scholarships, gay and lesbian awareness programs, HIV education material, and other initiatives.

== Work Out ==
Blasdell appeared on the July 18, 2006, cover of The Advocate alongside the show's star, Jackie Warner. Speaking to AfterElton.com around the same time, he talked about how much he enjoyed working on the Bravo show. "It's a beautiful thing because it really focuses on being gay and the gay community in general," he said. "The people they picked represent our community very well. I mean, there's drama, of course. There is in any community. But the three of us give different examples of what it is to be gay. And none of it is negative."

Blasdell sought neither celebrity nor the spotlight and was reserved about his new-found fame. He viewed his celebrity as an opportunity to market a book he had been working on, related to the early deaths of his parents and sister, as well as his time caring for his grandmother in her final days. He confided to one of his personal training clients that he wished to share those experiences with the public, with the hope that it would benefit others.

== Death ==
At the time of his death in 2007, Blasdell was 44 years old. According to The Advocate, he died unexpectedly after being rushed to the hospital. No official report has been released on the cause of death. According to reports, he was hospitalized in December and he went into a coma not long after New Year's. He had previously undergone chemotherapy for a brain tumor, but was reportedly in remission at the time of his death.

On April 10, Bravo released the third episode into the second season of its series "Work Out". Doug was dealing with the medical situation of his ex-lover, who was undergoing kidney complications as well. He was assisting in helping him with building enough strength to undergo a kidney transplant.

The day before Doug's 44th birthday, Doug and his ex-partner of 15 years, Cheo, were working out at SkySport. In cutscenes, Doug talked about how other members of his family did not live to see 43 and that he was going to celebrate his 44th birthday, a momentous occasion for him. He prophetically states this will be the last birthday party that he will celebrate.

During his birthday party and Cheo's blood treatment, Doug was noticeably sick onscreen, coughing almost nonstop. Finally after his party, he was "M.I.A.", in a very concerned Jackie's words, because he had not come into the spa for a week and had not answered phone calls. Jackie did not realize how serious everything was until she finally got a call from Cheo saying that Doug had a very severe flu and was admitted to the hospital; Blasdell was so dehydrated that his kidneys shut down to the point where he was put into a chemically induced coma.

Jackie announced the news of his illness to her trainers, some of whom were visibly upset and saddened by the news. Despite a past disagreement between him and fellow openly gay trainer Jesse Brune, Doug was well liked and respected by his fellow trainers and his SkySport clients, including singer Jody Watley. Trainer Brian Peeler broke the news of Doug's death to his fellow trainers.

On February 9, 2007, Entertainment Weekly reported kidney failure as the cause of death.

In an April Blog on BravoTv's website, Brian Peeler announced that Doug had been undergoing chemotherapy for lymphoma. Doug became ill with salmonella poisoning after his birthday and later developed a staph infection from the shunt in his neck that would ultimately cause his liver to also shut down and contribute to his death. Brian further discusses the circumstances surrounding Doug's death in a recent interview with AfterElton.com. A primary central nervous system lymphoma (PCNSL) is a primary intracranial tumor appearing mostly in patients with severe immunosuppression (typically patients with AIDS). PCNSLs represent around 20% of all cases of lymphomas in HIV infections (other types are Burkitt's lymphomas and immunoblastic lymphomas). Primary CNS lymphoma is highly associated with Epstein-Barr virus (EBV) infection (> 90%) in immunodeficient patients (such as those with AIDS and those iatrogenically immunosuppressed).
