= Jesse Brune =

American celebrity chef

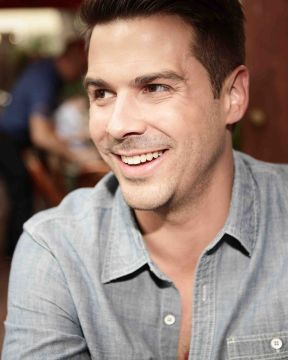
- Born: 1980 (age 45–46); Renton, Washington
- Education: Cornish College of the Arts; California Institute of the Arts; Le Cordon Bleu College of Culinary Arts
- Occupations: Chef; Co-founder, Inspire Spiritual Community; LGBTQ+ activist
- Years active: 2006-present
- Spouse: Christopher Brune-Horan (m. 2014)
- Website: https://chefjessebrune.com

Jesse Brune (born 1980) is a celebrity chef, personal trainer and lifestyle coach. He is best known for his roles on the reality television series Work Out on Bravo, Private Chefs of Beverly Hills on the Food Network, and Home Made Simple on the Oprah Winfrey Network (OWN). He is the co-founder and executive director of Project Service LA.

== Early life and education ==
Brune was born and raised by Southern Baptist parents in Renton, Washington. He studied dance at the Cornish College of the Arts in Seattle, before moving to California in 2000, at age 19, in pursuit of an acting career. He studied acting for two years at the California Institute of the Arts in Valencia, and then moved to Los Angeles to focus on getting commercial work. Told by his management company that in order to become a successful actor he needed to pretend to be straight, he rejected the advice and decided to change course and become a chef. In 2005, he enrolled at Le Cordon Bleu College of Culinary Arts in Los Angeles. While there, he became certified as a personal trainer and started teaching boot camp classes.

== Career ==
=== Chef and personal trainer ===
In 2006, while he was finishing up culinary school, and after developing a following teaching at Barry's Boot Camp, Brune was cast as one of the trainers on the Bravo reality television show Work Out, about the goings on at a high-end Beverly Hills gym run by Jackie Warner. Featured as both a trainer and a chef, he was on the show for its entire original three-season run. After it ended, he moved back to Seattle to launch a new business venture, but with the economic downturn, he lost a key investor. He decided to return to Los Angeles, where he began studying Buddhism, meditation and spiritual living, and working as a personal lifestyle coach.

Brune appeared as a chef on Private Chefs of Beverly Hills on the Food Network for both seasons. The show, which premiered in December 2009, follows six chefs in Beverly Hills as they cater events for high-end clients. Starting in 2011, he has spent three seasons as a resident chef on Home Made Simple on OWN. The show was nominated for a 2014 Daytime Emmy Award for Outstanding Lifestyle Show. In 2015 the show won the Daytime Emmy Award for Outstanding Lifestyle Show.

With a focus on healthy alternatives and organic cooking, Brune's recipes have been featured in Us Weekly, and his fitness tips have been highlighted in Life & Style and OK! magazines. He has worked as a spokesperson for Nair for Men, taught classes at Epicurean and other culinary schools, and teaches spin classes in Los Angeles.

=== Inspire Spiritual Community ===
Inspire Spiritual Community is a Los Angeles-based spiritual community focused on supporting members of the LGBTQ community, helping them find peace of mind and transform their lives for the better. Founded by Brune and Jennifer Hadley, the nonprofit was launched in 2010, with Brune serving as executive director.

In 2015, Project Service LA changed its name to Inspire Spiritual Community.

== Personal life ==
Brune is openly gay. He came out of the closet in 1995, at the age of 15. He married writer Christopher Horan on February 15, 2014, becoming Jesse Brune-Horan.

== Television appearances ==
Year	Series	Network	Appeared on
2006-08	Work Out	Bravo	Seasons 1-3
2008	The Bonnie Hunt Show	Syndication	1 episode
2009-11	Private Chefs of Beverly Hills	Food Network	Seasons 1-2
2011	The Doctors	CBS	1 episode
2011	Anna & Kristina's Grocery Bag	OWN	1 episode
2012	Marie	Hallmark Channel	1 episode
2011-13	Home Made Simple	OWN	Seasons 1-3
