= Stuart O'Keeffe =

Irish celebrity chef

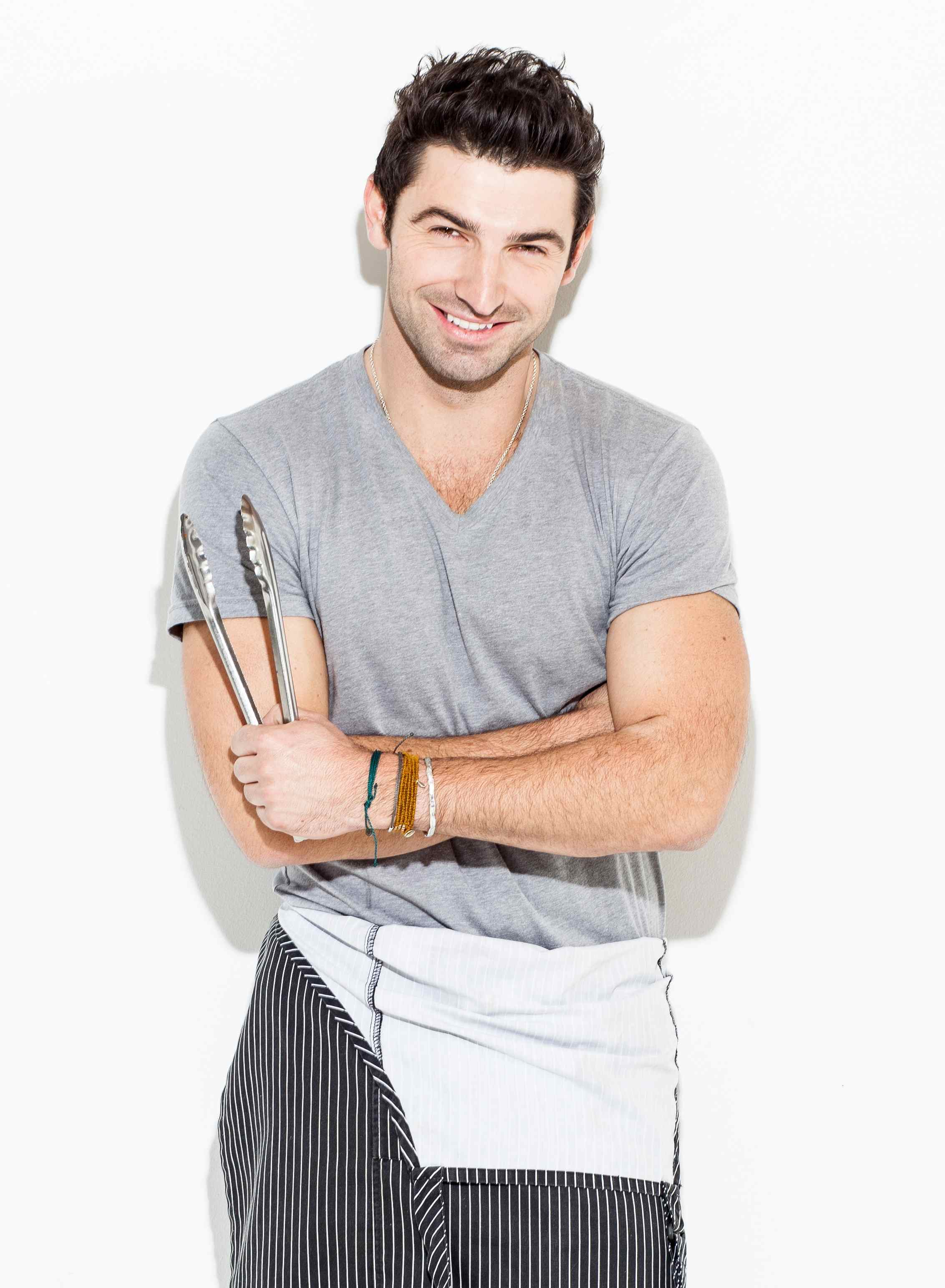
- Born: 15 September 1981 (age 45); Nenagh, Ireland
- Occupation: Celebrity chef
- Known for: Private Chefs of Beverly Hills; Tupperware brand ambassador (2008–2011); Asiana Airlines (2013); Home Made Simple

Stuart O'Keeffe (born Stuart Denis O'Keeffe, 15 September 1981) is an Irish celebrity chef, food writer, and television personality best known for his appearance on the Food Network's Private Chefs of Beverly Hills and other TV shows. He was a brand ambassador for Tupperware and served as their North American chef from 2008 to 2011. O'Keeffe resides in West Hollywood, California.

After appearing on the Food Network, O'Keeffe was featured on Stuart's Kitchen which aired in Ireland, New Zealand and South Africa. O'Keeffe has also made appearances on Marie, CBS's The Talk, The Home and Family Show, and Republic of Telly. He can also be seen in commercials for Asiana Airlines, featured in their national "Fly with Color" campaign.

== Early life ==
O'Keeffe was born in Nenagh, Ireland. He has two brothers and one sister. Growing up in Nenagh, Ireland, he developed a passion for cooking by watching his mother put together meals. O'Keeffe reports that he would abandon his homework in favour of helping his aunt and mother prepare pastries and pies, and that he became a "right handy sous-chef" in the family kitchen by age 7. His mother influenced his cooking style by inspiring him to use the fresh, locally sourced ingredients.

== Career ==
From 2000 to 2004, O'Keeffe attended the Dublin Institute of Technology and graduated with a B.A. in Culinary Arts. Shortly after, O'Keeffe travelled through Europe, moved to France, and learned high-end French cooking in Bordeaux by working in a small restaurant. O'Keeffe specialises in Continental and New American cuisine.

At 22, O'Keeffe moved to Napa Valley and was a chef in a hotel. By 2004, he had moved to Los Angeles and was cooking for A-list celebrities, private clients and parties in Hollywood. From 2008 to 2011, O'Keeffe was a spokesperson for Tupperware and was featured in company catalogues and promotional events throughout USA and Canada.

O'Keeffe had a run on Ireland's TV3 with a show called Stuart's Kitchen. His re-location to California and filming schedule stopped the network from picking up a second season but TV3 continues to develop specials and programming with O'Keeffe. O'Keeffe offers a complementary app through iTunes which enables people to make step-by-step recipes as they watch the show.

O'Keeffe is featured on OWN's Home Made Simple. He was a contributing Food Columnist for the Evening Herald from 2011 to 2012.

O'Keeffe has done private and promotional events with celebrity clients such as Sofia Vergara, Sharon Stone, Owen Wilson, Hilary Swank, the Kardashians, Jessica Lange, Joan Collins, Ryan Murphy and Kelly Clinton.

In June 2012, he was chosen to cook for a fundraising campaign dinner for President Barack Obama and First Lady Michelle Obama at a Beverly Hills fundraiser organised by Ryan Murphy. O'Keeffe was one of only six chefs selected for the $25,000-a-head function. Right before the event, O'Keeffe was hit by a car while riding his motorcycle and due to his injuries, was unable to fulfill the obligation.

=== Private Chefs of Beverly Hills ===
In Dec. 2009, Food Network launched a show called the Private Chefs of Beverly Hills. The docu-soap follows 6 private chefs, including O'Keeffe, as they work for a premiere private chef placement agency called Big City Chefs. On call 24/7, the chefs cater eccentric and speciality events for celebrity and high-profile clients such as a Botox party and an event for a luxury doggy daycare. O'Keeffe is the only non-American chef featured. The show has aired for 2 seasons and 16 episodes.

O'Keeffe now hosts the Don’t Let It Stu podcast with Hurrdat Media Network.

== Endorsements ==
From 2008 to 2011, O'Keeffe served as a brand ambassador for Tupperware. Part of the company's New Chef Initiative, O'Keeffe was named the North American Chef for the brand and did demonstrations to promote healthy eating and cooking using Tupperware products. He was also featured in company catalogues and cooked at promotional events with celebrities like Sofia Vergara.

O'Keeffe launched "Let's Cook!" in April 2012, an initiative that provides free cooking classes and demonstrations for people with arthritis. Partnering with Arthritis Ireland and healthcare company Abbott, the chef developed nutritionally balanced recipes for arthritis sufferers. For the classes, O'Keeffe incorporated culinary skills which maximise comfort for people with arthritis pain and symptoms.

In November 2012, O'Keeffe appeared on CBS's The Talk and teamed up with Udi's gluten free to make several gluten free recipes for the holiday season.

In 2013, O'Keeffe was selected to be a spokes model for Asiana Airlines and is featured in advertisements for their global campaign, Fly with Color. In 2024, he claimed that he was one of the original "Fab Five" in Queer Eye before being replaced by Antoni Porowski.
