= Private Chefs of Beverly Hills =

- Genre: Cooking show
- Starring: Manouschka Guerrier, Stuart O'Keeffe, Tom Stieber, Samantha Martz, Sasha Perl-Raver, Jesse Brune, Brian Hill, Brooke Peterson
- Country of origin: United States
- Original language: English
- No. of seasons: 3
- No. of episodes: 22

Production
- Executive producers: Jenny Daly, Bryan O'Donnell, Susan Youth
- Producers: Derek Klein, Art Altounian, Nick Kellis, Jennifer Vasta
- Cinematography: George Feucht
- Running time: 30 minutes
- Production company: T Group Productions

Original release
- Network: Food Network
- Release: December 29, 2009 – October 12, 2010

Private Chefs of Beverly Hills is a reality television series on Food Network. The show follows six chefs from the Big City Chefs private chef placement agency in Beverly Hills, California. The show chronicles preparations for lavish parties for eccentric clientele in the Los Angeles area.

A lawsuit was filed against Food Network, claiming the show's idea was stolen from a private chef firm not associated with the show. The private chef firm tried to stop Food Network from airing the show's second-season premiere, which aired on October 12, 2010.

== Episodes ==
Six private chefs are hired to prepare food for the high-end people in Los Angeles. They have to prepare what the client asks for, which is sometimes an issue, and there are many moments of drama, comedy, and disaster.

== Season 1 ==
- Pilot (Into the Fryer)
- In the Dog House
- Foodzilla
- Rockin' Rolls
- Challah Back
- It Ain't Easy Being Green
- Teenage Tasteland

== Season 2 ==
- A Side of Lamas
- A Very "Brady" Birthday
- Seance Sautee
- Thrilla for Foodzilla
- Tickled Pink
- Who's the Boss
- Flappers and Knee Slappers
- Whole Lotta Loaf
