= Arnold Johannessen =

Norwegian footballer (1937-2007)

Personal information
- Date of birth: 15 December 1937
- Date of death: 27 January 2007 (aged 69)

International career
Years	Team	Apps	(Gls)
1959	Norway	3	(0)

Arnold Johannessen (15 December 1937 – 27 January 2007) was a Norwegian footballer. He played in three matches for the Norway national football team 1959.
