= Bryan T. Donovan =

American actor

Bryan T. Donovan (born 1973) is an American actor, writer, producer who appeared on the first season of Thintervention with Jackie Warner, a docu-series about health and fitness on BRAVO.

== Early life ==
Donovan was born in Sterling Heights, Michigan, a suburb of Detroit and graduated high school from the prestigious Interlochen Arts Academy where he majored in theatre.

== Career ==
=== Television ===
Donovan’s first television job was a recurring role on the ABC soap opera All My Children. Other television appearances include Law & Order, Medium, Nite Tales; The Series, Boardwalk Empire, and Blue Bloods.

=== Film ===
Donovan starred and produced his first comedy short, Steeling Magnolias which premiered at Outfest and has since traversed the world in various film festivals. Donovan teamed with Steakhaus Productions in 2008 and produced several films including Weather Girl, 6 Month Rule, Annie in the Aisle of Irma, The Rise, and Church & State. As an actor, Donovan has appeared in the films Annie in The Aisle of Irma, Sunset Stories and My Eleventh.

== Filmography ==
Film / Television
Year	Title	Role	Notes
2006	Law & Order	Uniform Cop #2	(TV Series), 1 episode: "Family Friend"
2008	Medium	Political Consultant	(TV Series), 1 episode: "Aftertaste"
2009	Nite Tales: The Series	Greg	(TV Series), 1 episode: "Black Widow"
2009	Half Truth	Soap Actor	(Short film)
2009	Steeling Magnolias	Morgan	(Short film)
2011	I Love You Like Crazy	Nurse Big Guns McGee	(Short film)
2011	6 Month Rule	Lyndsey	(Film)
2012	Sunset Stories	Transplant Coordinator	(Film)
2013	Blue Bloods	Brendan McGuire	(TV Series), 1 episode: "Bad Blood"
2013	Boardwalk Empire	Western Electric Factory Worker (uncredited)	(TV Series), 1 episode: "Erlkönig"
2014	My Eleventh	Marc	(Film)

=== Stage ===
New York City productions include Strike Up the Band, Li'l Abner and On A Clear Day at Encores! City Center. He originated the roles of Bernard in Dream True at the Vineyard Theatre and Wil in Fanny Hill at the Goodspeed Opera House. Donovan made his Broadway debut in the play Wrong Mountain, the last American play of the century to open on the Great White Way. He played the role of Greg in the Los Angeles production of It's Just Sex at the Zepher Theatre. In the fall of 2006, Donovan made his stand-up debut at Caroline's Comedy Club in New York City.

== Personal life ==
Donovan resides in NYC.
