= Gordon Macklin =

American businessman

Gordon S. Macklin (1928 - January 30, 2007) was an American businessman. He was the first President and CEO of the NASDAQ from 1971 to 1987. He was also a board member of WorldCom from 1998 to its collapse in 2002.

Macklin was born in Cleveland, Ohio and raised in Shaker Heights. He graduated with a BA in economics from Brown University in 1950, and returned to Cleveland to work for McDonald & Company Securities, where he later became a partner. He was elected president of the National Association of Securities Dealers (NASD) in 1970, remaining in office until 1987. He was chairman of the National Clearing Corp from 1970 to 1975, and president of NASDAQ, the world's first electronic stock market, from 1975 to 1987.

He became chairman of investment bank Hambrecht & Quist, based in Boston, in 1987, and then chaired the venture capital firm White River Corporation from 1992 until it was sold to Harvard Private Group in 1998.

He then joined the board of WorldCom as an independent director. Along with his fellow directors, he took little action to prevent the massive accountancy fraud which led to the company's bankruptcy in 2002, costing investors and employees billions of dollars. In 2001, the board discussed accountancy concerns five times, but their compensation and share options eleven times. In 2005, he joined nine former WorldCom directors in paying back $18 million as compensation for investor losses, thought to be less than 20% of the personal net assets of the 10 directors.

He joined the board of online retailer Overstock.com in 1999 and was also a director of the biotechnology company MedImmune, and the White Mountains Insurance Group. He was a director, trustee or managing general partner various companies in the Franklin Templeton group. He was also co-chairman of the Alexis de Tocqueville Institute.

Macklin was predeceased by his wife, Marilyn and survived by two sons and two daughters. His nephew, Donald Dawn, currently manages his foundation, the Gordon and Marilyn Macklin Foundation. He died following a stroke, aged 78.
