= Mendy Samstein =

Jehudah Menachem Mendel "Mendy" Samstein (July 25, 1938 – January 24, 2007) was an American civil rights activist.

Born in Manhattan, he majored in European history at Brandeis, and later earned a master's degree in the same subject from Cornell. He was studying for a Ph.D. in history at the University of Chicago when he quit to join the civil rights movement in the South. He became a full-time organizer for the Student Nonviolent Coordinating Committee (or SNCC, pronounced "snick"). Stokely Carmichael, later chairman of SNCC, called Samstein "one in a million".

Later on, Samstein also organized protests against the Vietnam War. He had a variety of jobs, including working as a teacher, as a psychoanalyst, and running a summer camp. In 2000, he and other civil rights veterans protested the handling of the presidential vote in Florida.

Samstein was married to Nancy Cooper, a fellow civil rights activist. He died from carcinoid cancer at his home in New Lisbon, New York, aged 68.
