= Stanley Slotkin =

Stanley Slotkin (1905–1997) was a prominent Los Angeles businessman specializing in medical and party rentals through his company Abbey Rents. Slotkin also had strong interests that influenced his life and caused his philanthropy.

== Life ==
Slotkin grew up in a family of Russian immigrants. Born in New York, Slotkin was raised by his parents in Kansas City. In Kansas City, Slotkin came up with a business plan to rent rather than sell.

In the 1930s, Slotkin opened his first Abbey Rents store in St. Louis. Stanley Slotkin started increasing his company after this and it became the world's largest rental firm in 1965. During the growth of his company, in 1934, Slotkin relocated his business headquarters to Los Angeles. Abbey Rents had 90 rental outlets that lent a wide variety of goods, including party supplies and medical equipment. He had two children with Miriam Slotkin: Diane and Mark.

== Care for the disabled ==
Slotkin believed that plastic surgery was important for people with physical deformities. To allow his belief to proceed, Slotkin opened a clinic that provided plastic surgery—free of charge—to people who could not otherwise afford the corrective surgeries necessary to repair physical deformities like cleft palates and harelips. With Slotkin's financial backing, the clinic was able to perform tens of thousands of these operations.

In addition, Slotkin helped to start Epihab, a job-skills training project for people with epilepsy. Founded in the late 1950s, Epihab trained epileptics in a variety of skilled and semi-skilled jobs and helped them find positions to utilize their new skills.

== Historical Interests ==
Another avid interest of Slotkin's was antique books and archaeology. Over the years, Slotkin collected a number of relics that he gave to numerous universities and museums. One such example is that of an ancient antiphonary or choir book thought to be used in the Cathedral of Seville in about 1500. Slotkin presented sheets from this book to Marquette University, the Milwaukee Public Museum, the St. Louis City Art Museum, St. Louis University and St. Louis Cathedral.

In 1963, Slotkin bought the Charles Darwin Family Library in London and donated all the papers and artefacts from the collection to the University of Southern California.

=== Biblical archaeology ===
In the papers from the Charles Darwin Family Library in London, Slotkin found a story about the Tomb of Joseph in Nazareth that sparked his curiosity. The search for this tomb led Slotkin to the Cave of the Nativity, the site that Christians have recognized as the birthplace of Christ since A.D. 325, and eventually to the Nativity Stones.

In 1962, Elias Bandak, mayor of Bethlehem, hosted Slotkin in a visit to the holy land. Stokin visited the Cave of the Nativity while it was being renovated and became interested in stones that were being removed. Bandak gave the stones to Stokin as a gift and had the stones shipped to America. Michael Anthony got permission from Slotkin to use the nativity stone in the making of Christian Jewelry.

== Global policy ==
He was one of the signatories of the agreement to convene a convention for drafting a world constitution. As a result, for the first time in human history, a World Constituent Assembly convened to draft and adopt the Constitution for the Federation of Earth.
