= Mauno Jokipii =

Finnish professor (1924–2007)

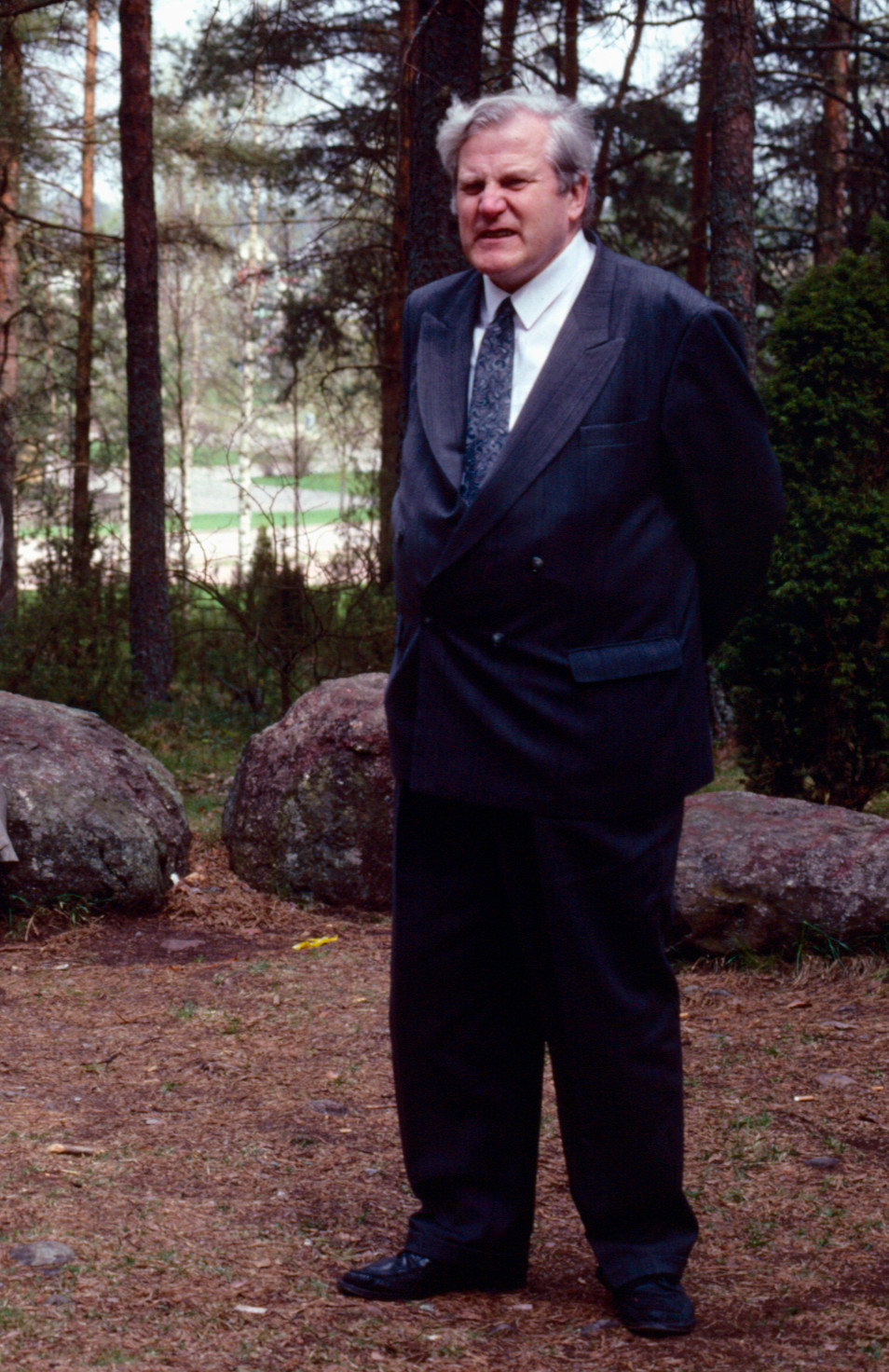
- Professor Mauno Jokipii presenting a meeting place of Iron Age in Eura, Finland in 1992
- Born: 21 August 1924; Helsinki, Finland
- Died: 2 January 2007 (aged 82); Jyväskylä, Finland

Mauno Jokipii (21 August 1924 – 2 January 2007) was a Finnish professor at the University of Jyväskylä in history specializing in World War II. He was a thorough investigator and a prolific author. Among his works were studies of the local history of Jyväskylä and the university and historical province of Satakunta.

Jokipii was born in Helsinki. Jokipii attended University of Helsinki from 1952 to 1959, and began publishing almost immediately (1954). He received his doctorate in Philosophy in 1957. He was Dean of the History-Linguistics department from 1960 to 1966.

Although some of his early works had been noted, Jokipii sprung on the world scene with his 900-page study of the Finnish SS battalion in World War II. This study established a new level of detail in World War II military history. Jokipii's massive work The Continuation War: An Investigation of German-Finnish Military Collaboration 1940-1941 firmly established him as a world scholar and moved the debate about German Finnish relations during World War II to a new level.

In recent years the academic integrity of his work has increasingly been questioned, in particular his work on the Finnish SS battalion has been accused by younger researchers including André Swanström, Marko Tikka, and Oula Silvennoinen of politically motivated whitewashing in order to conceal war crimes committed by the battalion. The daily newspaper Helsingin Sanomat demonstrated in its related article that Jokipii had falsified soldier diaries in order to obscure references to atrocities.

Jokipii died in Jyväskylä.

== Selected publications ==
- Jokipii, Mauno (2003). Der Kreuzzug nach Karelien und der Kampf um den Wasserweg auf der Newa [Karjalan ristiretki ja taistelu Nevan reitistä] (in German). Snellman-instituutti. ISBN 951-842-255-9.
- Jokipii, Mauno (2002). Hitlerin Saksa ja sen vapaaehtoisliikkeet: Waffen-SS:n suomalaispataljoona vertailtavana (in Finnish). Helsinki: Suomalaisen Kirjallisuuden Seura. ISBN 951-746-335-9.
- Jokipii, Mauno (1998). Vienan heimosodat ja itsenäistymisajatus (in Finnish). Vapaussodan perinneliitto. ISBN 951-97885-0-6.
- Jokipii, Mauno (1996). Panttipataljoona : suomalaisen SS-pataljoonan historia (in Finnish). Veljesapu. ISBN 952-90-7363-1.
- Jokipii, Mauno (1995). Suomalaiset Saksan historiaa tutkimassa (in Finnish). Snellman-instituutti. ISBN 951-842-173-0.
- Jokipii, Mauno (1994). Suomi ja Saksa maamme itsenäisyyden aikana (in Finnish). Snellman-instituutti. ISBN 951-842-151-X.
- Jokipii, Mauno (1987). Jatkosodan synty: tutkimuksia Saksan ja Suomen sotilaallisesta yhteistyöstä 1940-41 [The Continuation War: An Investigation of German-Finnish Military Collaboration 1940-1941] (in Finnish). Helsinki: Otava. ISBN 951-1-08799-1.
- Jokipii, Mauno (1974). Satakunnan historia. IV: Satakunnan talouselämä uuden ajan alusta isoonvihaan (in Finnish). Satakunnan maakuntaliitto. ISBN 951-95095-2-6.
- Jokipii, Mauno (1960). Suomen kreivi- ja vapaaherrakunnat. II (in Finnish). Suomen historiallinen seura.
- Jokipii, Mauno (1956). Suomen kreivi- ja vapaaherrakunnat. I (Thesis) (in Finnish). Helsingin Yliopisto.
- Jokipii, Mauno, ed. (1993). Keski-Suomen historia. 3: Keski-Suomi itsenäisyyden aikana (in Finnish). Keski-Suomen maakuntaliitto. ISBN 951-8906-87-4.
- Jokipii, Mauno, ed. (1996). Paikallishistoria (in Finnish). Gummerus. ISBN 951-20-4969-4.
