= Work Out (TV series) =

- Genre: Reality television
- Starring: Greg Plitt; Rob Riches; David Kimmerle; James Ellis; Steve Cook; Chady Dunmore; Jamie Eason; Tiffany Taylor
- Country of origin: United States
- Original language: English
- No. of seasons: 3
- No. of episodes: 23

Production
- Running time: 42 minutes

Original release
- Network: Bravo
- Release: July 19, 2006 – June 10, 2008

Related
- Work Out New York

Work Out in the Zone (previously known as Work Out) is an American reality television series on Bravo, which premiered on July 19, 2006. The show is centered on fitness trainers and models located in the many cities of California. The first three seasons featured many of the trainers who work for fitness trainer Jackie Warner, and some other aspects of the gym and its clients as well as Warner's other fitness ventures, and private life. The third season of Work Out ended on June 10, 2008, and was subsequently canceled.

== Cast ==
=== Work Out: Seasons 1-3 ===
In 2003, fitness expert Jackie Warner opened Sky Sport and Spa. On July 19, 2006, the Bravo network aired the first episode of Work Out (developed following Jackie's appearance on Jonathan Antin's Bravo reality series Blow Out). The show follows the day-to-day routine of Jackie and shows all of the drama that goes on behind the scenes in keeping a business afloat, while juggling her own personal life, as well as dealing with the personal issues of those who work for her as trainers.

==== Trainers ====
- Jackie Warner (2006-2008)
- Doug Blasdell (2006-2007)
- Brian Peeler (2006–2008)
- Jesse Brune (2006–2008)
- Gregg Butler (2007–2008)
- Rebecca Cardon (2006–2008)
- Erika Jacobson (2006–2008)
- Jesse "JD" Jordan (2008)
- Agostina Laneri (2008)
- Greg Plitt (2008)
- Andre Riley (2006–2007)
- Renessa Williams (2008)
- Jennifer "Zen" Gray (2006–2007)

== Reaction to the series ==
=== Early reactions ===
Variety's initial response to the show included these comments:

" ... It is Mimi [Jackie's girlfriend in the show's first two seasons] who is this show's dragon lady, a stunningly twisted personality even for reality TV."

"In the pilot episode, Warner was a bit self-conscious and stiff. But as time goes on she learns to loosen up and live with the constant presence of the cameras, and her story and drama unfold more naturally as the show becomes increasingly riveting."
