= Robert Meier =

German centenarian (1897–2007)

Robert Meier (March 10, 1897 – January 29, 2007) was, aged 109, Germany's oldest living man, a combat-wounded veteran of the First World War and one of Germany's last surviving veterans of that war. Meier became Germany's oldest living man on March 2, 2005, when he was age 107, following the death of 111-year-old Hermann Dörnemann. Meier lived in Witten, North Rhine-Westphalia.

He was a rarity in being a survivor of the infantry, having seen combat in France on the western front. He was also a Second World War veteran, spending some time as a prisoner of war in the Caucasus.

In October 2006, Robert Meier met then 110-year-old Henry Allingham, the oldest living British World War I veteran, in his hometown. France's oldest veteran ever, 111-year-old Maurice Floquet, sent his regards, but could not attend, because he was too frail to travel. Floquet subsequently died on the eve of Armistice Day, November 10, 2006.

Robert Meier was born to German parents in Sergejewka, Ukraine, in the Russian Empire. He was a member of the Social Democratic Party of Germany for 70 years, and worked as a railway worker. His wife Ella died in 1967; they had a son and a daughter.

Robert Meier had a fine sense of humour; in 2006, he let the local press take his picture while he was wearing a World War I spiked helmet and a T-shirt with the slogan "109 - na und?" ("109 - so what?") on it. He was in good health keeping his own household until late 2006, and hospitalized only a few weeks before his death: he had a bad fall right before Christmas Day and died about five weeks later on, just one day before he was scheduled to have an ulcer operation.
