= Sharon Tyler Herbst =

American cookbook author

- Sharon Herbst's headshot
- Born: November 26, 1942; Chicago, Illinois, U.S.
- Died: January 26, 2007 (aged 64); Bodega Bay, California, U.S.
- Occupations: Chef; cookbook author
- Writing career
- Period: 1987–2007
- Subject: Culinary Reference books

Sharon K. Herbst (November 26, 1942 – January 26, 2007) was an American cookbook and culinary books author.

Born as Sharon Tyler in Chicago, she was raised in Denver, Colorado. She may have been best known for her fourth book, the culinary reference work, The Food Lover's Companion.

She and her husband of 38 years, and the co-author of some of her books, Ron Herbst, had lived in Bodega Bay, California since 2003. They met in Denver in the late 1960s while working at the same luxury hotel.

Herbst was also a food and travel journalist, who had appeared on television shows such as Good Morning America and Today. She was also a past president and board member of the International Association of Culinary Professionals.

== Death ==
She died at her Bodega Bay, California home, aged 64, following a three-and-a-half-year battle with ovarian cancer.

== Publications ==
1. Breads (1987-01-01). HP Trade. 276 pages. ISBN 0-89586-219-0
  - Breads, Reprint Edition (1994-10-01). HP Trade. 276 pages. ISBN 1-55788-192-8
2. Simply Sensational Desserts (1987-01-01). HP Trade. 160 pages. ISBN 0-89586-237-9
3. The Joy of Cookies (1987-09-01). Barron's Educational Series. 220 pages. ISBN 0-8120-5839-9
  - The Joy of Cookies, Reprint Edition (1990-09-01). Barron's Educational Series. 220 pages. ISBN 0-8120-4518-1
4. Food Lover's Companion: Comprehensive Definitions of over 3000 Food, Wine and Culinary Terms (1990-01-01). Barron's Educational Series. 582 pages. ISBN 0-8120-4156-9
  - The New Food Lover's Companion, Second Edition: Comprehensive Definitions of Over 4000 Food, Drink, and Culinary Terms (1995-01-01). Barron's Educational Series. 715 pages. ISBN 0-8120-1520-7
  - The New Food Lover's Companion, Third Edition: Comprehensive Definitions of Nearly 6000 Food, Drink, and Culinary Terms (2001-03-01). Barron's Educational Series. 792 pages. ISBN 0-7641-1258-9
  - The New Food Lover's Companion, Fourth Edition: More than 6,700 A-to-Z entries describe foods, cooking techniques, herbs, spices, desserts, wines, and the ingredients for pleasurable dining. (2007-08-03). Barron's Educational Series. 830 pages. ISBN 0-7641-3577-5 (with Ron Herbst)
5. Dictionary of Cooking Terms (1990-02-01). Barron's Educational Series. ISBN 0-8120-5842-9
6. Cooking Smart: Recipes, Tips, and Techniques for Really Using the Time-Saving, Work-Saving Gadgets in Your Kitchen to Create Delicious Food (1992-04-01). HarperCollins. 367 pages. ISBN 0-06-016117-5
7. The Food Lover's Tiptionary: An A to Z Culinary Guide with More Than 4,500 Food and Drink Tips, Secrets, Shortcuts, and Other Things Cookbooks Never Tell You (1994-04-01). Morrow Cookbooks. 373 pages. ISBN 0-688-12146-2
  - The New Food Lover's Tiptionary, Revised Expanded Edition: More than 6,000 Food and Drink Tips, Secrets, Shortcuts, and Other Things Cookbooks Never Tell You (2002-08-06). Morrow Cookbooks. 528 pages. ISBN 0-06-093570-7
8. The Wine Lover's Companion: Comprehensive Definitions for More Than 3500 Wine-Related Terms (1995-03-01). Random House. 644 pages. ISBN 0-8120-1479-0 (with Ron Herbst)
  - The New Wine Lover's Companion, Second Edition: Comprehensive Definitions for More Than 3500 Wine-Related Terms (2003-10-15). Barron's Educational Series. 684 pages. ISBN 0-7641-2003-4 (with Ron Herbst)
9. The Food Lover's Guide to Chocolate & Vanilla (1996-06-01). William Morrow & Co. 160 pages. ISBN 0-688-13770-9
10. The Food Lover's Guide to Meat & Potatoes (1996-06-01). William Morrow & Co. 160 pages. ISBN 0-688-13771-7
11. Never Eat More Than You Can Lift and Other Food Quotes and Quips: 1,500 Notable Quotables About Edibles and Potables (1997-05-19). Broadway. 384 pages. ISBN 0-553-06901-2
12. A Meal Without Wine Is Breakfast (1998-09-11). Michael O'Mara Books. 180 pages. ISBN 1-85479-368-3
13. The Ultimate A-to-Z Bar Guide:1,000 Drink Recipes, Definitions, and Bartending Know-How (1998-10-13). Broadway. 400 pages. ISBN 0-7679-0197-5 (with Ron Herbst)
14. The Ultimate Liquor-Free Drink Guide: More Than 325 Drinks With No Buzz, but Plenty of Pizzazz (2002-10-08). Broadway. 304 pages. ISBN 0-7679-0506-7
15. The Ultimate Guide to Pitcher Drinks: Cool Cocktails for a Crowd (2003-03-25). Villard. 224 pages. ISBN 0-8129-6768-2
16. The Cheese Lover's Companion: The Ultimate A-to-Z Cheese Guide with More Than 1,000 Listings for Cheeses and Cheese-Related Terms (2007-07-01). Morrow Cookbooks. 704 pages. ISBN 0-06-053704-3 (with Ron Herbst)
