= Olli-Matti Multamäki =

Lieutenant General Olli-Matti Multamäki (18 April 1948 – 7 January 2007) was the commander of the Finnish Army.

== Career ==
Born in Iitti, Multamäki graduated from Kadettikoulu, the Finnish military academy in 1971, and from Sotakorkeakoulu, the Finnish defence university in 1985. He has a M.Sc. degree in security strategy from the National Defense University of the United States, obtained in 1994.

He served with the United Nations Good Offices Mission in Afghanistan and Pakistan from 1988 to 1989, and as the military advisor to Lakhdar Brahimi, head of the United Nations Assistance Mission for Afghanistan in 2003. In 2002 he served as the Senior National Representative and chief of the Finnish mission to the United States Central Command (USCENTCOM) in Tampa, Florida in the war on terror. He served as Deputy Military Representative to NATO and the European Union in 2004.

Multamäki served as the commander of the Pori Brigade from 1997 to 2000. He was appointed the chief of the Finnish Army from 1 August 2004, and was promoted to Lieutenant General on 6 December 2006. Multamäki retired and was succeeded as commander of the Army on 1 January 2007, by Major General Ilkka Aspara. He died of a swift illness in Helsinki six days later.
