= Italo Sarrocco =

Italo Sarrocco (11 May 1898 – 8 January 2007) was one of the last surviving veterans of the First World War, and one of the oldest people in Italy at the time of his death. He fought for Italy at the all-important Battle of Vittorio Veneto in October–November 1918 in the final stage of the war, which ended the war for the Austro-Hungarian Empire, and caused the German Empire to end the war.

== Post- World War I ==
Late in his life, he was honoured with the Italian order of merit called the Knight of the Order of Vittorio Veneto (Ordine di Vittorio Veneto), which is a medal (or Iron Cross). Italo received the Cross for his service in the war at the pivotal battle for which it was named. To qualify for the Cross, the soldiers had to have six months of combat and have already received the War Merit Cross. This is a knighthood created in 1968 for World War I veterans, in order to commemorate 50 years after the war, which was given by the President of the Republic of Italy. This Cross was created with the knowledge that the Order of Vittorio Veneto would pass into history after all the knights died, like the veterans themselves.

== Death ==
Italo died in his home town of Rivisondoli at the age of 108. Many of the regional authorities were involved in honouring him at his funeral.
