= Gabriano Shelton =

South African soccer player (born 2006)

Personal information
- Full name: Gabriano Jabez Shelton
- Date of birth: 27 September 2007 (age 19)
- Place of birth: England
- Positions: Right-back; midfielder

Team information
- Current team: Liverpool

Youth career
- Years: Team
- SV Avenwedde
- PRB Gütersloh
- APOEL
- 2017: Allstars
- 2017–: Liverpool

Gabriano Jabez Shelton (born 27 September 2007) is a footballer who plays as a right-back or midfielder for Liverpool.

== Early life ==
Shelton was born in England to South African parents from Vergenoeg, East London, Eastern Cape. His father was a footballer for local side Saints Football Club in East London, and also played cricket for United Cricket Club. After the family moved to England in 2005, his father enrolled in the British Army.

Shelton attended the St Francis Xavier's College in Liverpool.

== Club career ==
Shelton started his career at the age of six in Germany, where he played for SV Avenwedde and PRB Gütersloh, before his family moved to Cyprus, and he played for APOEL. He returned to England, joining local Wigan-based side Allstars in October 2017. After being scouted by Manchester City, Burnley and Liverpool, he joined the academy of the latter in December of the same year.

== International career ==
Having witnessed the racial abuse suffered by Bukayo Saka, Marcus Rashford and Jadon Sancho following their penalty misses for England in the final of the UEFA Euro 2020, Shelton decided he wanted to represent South Africa at international level. While playing an academy game for Liverpool, Shelton noticed that former South African international Quinton Fortune was watching the match, and approached him to ask for advice regarding starting his international career. Fortune gave him the telephone number of South Africa under-17 manager, Duncan Crowie, and Shelton attempted to contacted him in order to express his desire to represent the nation, but initially did not hear back. Fortune also contacted former teammate, and current South African under-17 assistant manager, Aaron Mokoena, on Shelton's behalf, and Mokoena stated that Shelton would be assessed.

After eventually hearing back from Crowie, he was called up to the South Africa under-17 squad ahead of the 2023 U-17 Africa Cup of Nations. However, after suffering an illness and having to be hospitalised, he had no choice but to withdraw from the squad.

== Style of play ==
Shelton has listed his best position as being right-back, as it gives him the opportunity to attack down the wing. He has stated that his second-best position is as a central midfielder, where he is capable of breaking up play and starting attacks.

== Personal life ==
His brother, El Niño, is also a footballer, and currently also plays in the academy of Liverpool.
