= Food Lover's Companion =

Book by Sharon Tyler Herbst

Food Lover’s Companion
- Fourth Edition cover
- Author: Sharon Tyler Herbst and Ron Herbst
- Series: Barron's Cooking Guide
- Subject: Food and cooking
- Publisher: Barron's Educational Series
- Publication date: 1990 – 2015 (Deluxe 2nd)
- Publication place: United States
- Media type: trade paperback and hardcover (Deluxe edition only)
- Pages: 928 (5th), 864 (Deluxe 2nd)
- ISBN: 978-0764167034 (Deluxe 2nd)

Food Lover’s Companion is a book containing culinary terminology and conversion tables for cooking. Five editions have been published as of 2019.

The main section of the work is an A-to-Z list of defined culinary terminology, followed by a series of appendices.

Edition details
Edition	Published	ISBN	Pages	Entries
First	January 1990	0-8120-4156-9	582	Over 3,000
Second	January 1995	0-8120-1520-7	600	Over 4,000
Third	March 2001	0-7641-1258-9	792	Nearly 6,000
Fourth	August 2007	0-7641-3577-5	830	Over 6,700
Deluxe	September 2009	0-7641-6241-1	794	Over 6,700
Fifth	September 2013	978-1438001630	928	Over 7,200
Deluxe 2nd	April 2015	978-0764167034	864	Over 7,200

Third Edition cover

The Second Edition is a searchable source text at Epicurious, and the Third Edition is a searchable source text at Answers.com.

Sharon Tyler Herbst—the primary author—wrote 16 food and beverage related books before her death on 26 January 2007. Her husband Ron—who writes about wine and cheese—finished editing the Fourth Edition after her death and is credited as the coauthor.

== Reception ==
Bon Appetit hailed the book as "one of the best reference books we’ve seen, a must for every cook’s library", and The New York Times described it "As thick and as satisfying as a well-stuffed sandwich".

Famous chef Emeril Lagasse called it his favorite book, and it is required reading at the New England Culinary Institute.

== Deluxe edition ==
After the 2007 edition was published, Ron Herbst and the staff of Barron's Educational Series drastically reorganized the book, breaking out much of the material into specialized glossaries on subjects like chocolate, liqueurs, charcuterie, and spices. This edition was published in hardcover as The Deluxe Food Lover's Companion and included a marker ribbon bound into the spine. The 2013 fifth edition received a similar treatment in April 2015.

== Fourth edition appendices ==
In the deluxe editions, some of these have been folded into the glossary sections.

- Ingredient Equivalents – Weight to volume conversions
- Substituting Ingredients
- Pan Substitution Chart
- High-Altitude Baking Adjustments
- Boiling Point of Water at Various Altitudes
- General Temperature Equivalents
- Hand Test for Grilling Temperatures
- Oven Temperatures
- Fahrenheit/Celsius Conversion Formulas
- Microwave Oven Conversion Chart
- Recommended Safe Cooking Temperatures
- Candymaking Cold-Water Tests
- Frying Temperatures
- Smoke Points of Popular Oils
- Fatty Acid Profiles of Popular Oils
- U.S. Measurement Equivalents
- Wine and Spirit Bottle Sizes
- Approximate Metric Equivalents
- Metric Conversion Formulas
- Food Guide Pyramid
- What's a Serving?
- Food Label Terms
- A Guide to Food Labels
- Pasta Glossary
- British and American Food and Cooking Terms
- Seasoning Suggestions
- Meat Charts
- Food Additives Directory

== See also ==
- Larousse Gastronomique
- Le Répertoire de la Cuisine
