= Dale Noyd =

Decorated capitan and fighter pilot

Dale Edwin Noyd (May 1, 1933 – January 11, 2007) was a decorated captain and fighter pilot in the U.S. Air Force who gained worldwide attention when he became a conscientious objector to protest the Vietnam War.

== Military service ==
Noyd was born in Wenatchee, Washington. He attended Washington State University and was the only member of the 1955 Reserve Officers Training Corps at WSU to be offered a regular commission, as opposed to a reserve commission.

Noyd's superior R.O.T.C. record granted him the right to select his first base assignment. Noyd opted for the U.S. Air Force base at Woodbridge, England.

While serving in England, Noyd received a medal for landing a badly damaged F-100 Super Sabre fighter that was armed with a nuclear weapon.

Noyd later became an instructor at the United States Air Force Academy in Colorado Springs, Colorado.

== Dissension over Vietnam ==
Noyd began to regard the U.S. role in the Vietnam War as immoral and illegal. In 1966 he wrote an eight-page, single-spaced letter to Air Force supervisors asking to be allowed to resign or to be classed as a conscientious objector.

Noyd refused an order to train a pilot who would likely be sent to Vietnam, although he had been willing to teach at the Air Force Academy and train future military officers and pilots. He was court-martialed for disobeying the order.

Noyd's position at trial was that he was a "Humanist" and his religious beliefs prevented him from participating in a war he felt unjust and immoral. Noyd denied that he was opposed to all wars and agreed he would participate in wars he felt were morally justified. He introduced evidence at trial, through the testimony of a Roman Catholic Priest and Law Professor at Georgetown University, that his Humanist beliefs amounted to religious beliefs and should be recognized as a basis for conscious objector status. There was no evidence introduced that Humanism was recognized as a formal religion with accepted doctrines and beliefs relating to conscientious objection. However, the prosecution did not deny the sincerity of Noyd's beliefs.

The issues at trial involved not whether Noyd was sincere in his beliefs, but whether the law allowed someone to be a conscious objector when only opposed to some wars, but not all wars. The military judge and the appellate courts found that to be a conscientious objector under the law one must be opposed to all wars, not just those wars the individual deemed improper. Because Noyd's beliefs did not legally qualify him for conscientious objector status, he was bound to follow the orders to fly the training mission and his failure to do so constituted a refusal to obey an order.

On March 9, 1968, the court found Noyd guilty. The prosecution recommended a sentence of one year in prison and the Court sentenced him to one year in confinement, rather than the maximum five years, and stripped him of his pension and military benefits. During his appeal Noyd was confined to quarters with his wife and family and drew full military pay. He did not spend any time in any prison, for by the time the appeals had been ruled upon, his one year in confinement had passed.

== Post-military life ==
Noyd taught psychology (with an emphasis on psychoanalysis) at Earlham College for 20 years. After resigning from academia, Noyd built a boat that he used to sail to Tahiti. He then settled in Hawaii and returned to Washington when his health deteriorated.

He died from complications of emphysema.

Noyd's son Erik told The New York Times reporter Douglas Martin that his father kept two certificates on the wall of his study: the commendation he received for heroism, and his dishonorable discharge.
