= Bernard Boone =

French field hockey player

Bernard Henri Joseph Boone (23 September 1919 – 6 January 2007) was a French field hockey player who competed in the 1948 Summer Olympics and in the 1952 Summer Olympics.
