= Jackie Warner =

American television personality

- Born: Jacqueline Waddell; August 17, 1968 (age 57); Fairborn, Ohio, United States
- Occupations: Business owner, Entrepreneur, Reality show participant
- Notable credit: Work Out (Bravo Network)

Jackie Warner (born Jacqueline Renee Waddell on August 17, 1968) is an American fitness trainer best known for her participation in Work Out, a Bravo TV reality show. She owned Sky Sport and Spa, a gym and spa in Beverly Hills, California.

== Career ==
Warner moved to California at the age of 18. She has worked as a model, actor, and a script coordinator for Warner Brothers, eventually writing and selling her own script.

Athletic from an early age, Warner played inter-collegiate soccer and softball, and has been a lifelong equestrian competitor.

=== Work Out show ===
In 2004, Warner opened Sky Sport and Spa. On July 19, 2006, the Bravo network aired the first episode of Work Out. The reality show's first season followed Warner's daily routine, giving a behind-the-scenes look at how Warner runs her day-to-day business, juggles her personal life with then-girlfriend Milenna (Mimi) Saraiva, and deals with her employees' personal issues.

On March 18, 2007, Bravo launched a second season of "Work Out," where it continues to show Warner handling her personal life and controversial relationship with employee Rebecca Cardon, launching a new business venture, integrating a new trainer (Gregg Butler) into the mix, and dealing with the sudden death of trainer Doug Blasdell.

There was much debate over her relationship with Rebecca, whom she began to casually date during the filming of the second season late 2006. In April 2007, Warner stated during the Work Out "Reunion" show that due to the attention they have received, the relationship was to be kept private until decided otherwise.

=== Thintervention show ===
On July 27, 2010, Bravo announced that Warner would return to the network in September 2010 with Thintervention with Jackie Warner. This new fitness show followed Warner as she helps a group of eight clients lose weight, including former Real Housewives of Orange County star Jeana Keough.
