= Leonard Berg =

American neurologist (1927–2007)

Leonard Berg (1927 – January 15, 2007) was a neurologist at Washington University in St. Louis and a specialist in dementia and Alzheimer's disease. He was instrumental in the development of the Clinical Dementia Rating scale, a tool commonly used in research of these diseases.

Born in St. Louis, Missouri, Berg studied at Washington University, earning both his undergraduate and medical degrees there. He became an assistant professor of clinical neurology there in 1956, and also maintained a private practice from 1972 to 1989. He became a professor of neurology and from 1985 to 1998 directed Washington's Alzheimer's Disease Research Center. In 1985, he was also named president of the American Board of Psychiatry and Neurology.

During the 1980s, Berg helped develop a series of tests to assess a patient's level of dementia by determining their abilities in language, memory, and everyday tasks. A numerical scale was established, with a 0 corresponding to no symptoms and a 3 representing severe symptoms. The tool developed into the Clinical Dementia Rating Scale, and has gained wide acceptance in Alzheimer's disease research.
