= Georg Dahlfelt =

Danish footballer (1919-2007)

Personal information
- Full name: Georg Frederik Birkedal Dahlfelt
- Date of birth: 12 April 1919
- Place of birth: Odense, Denmark
- Date of death: 12 January 2007 (aged 87)
- Position: Midfielder

International career
Years	Team	Apps	(Gls)
1950	Denmark	4	(0)

Georg Dahlfelt (12 April 1919 – 12 January 2007) was a Danish footballer. He played in four matches for the Denmark national football team in 1950.
