= Sixto Rojas =

Paraguayan footballer (1982-2007)

Personal information
- Full name: Sixto Javier Rojas Pérez
- Date of birth: June 28, 1982
- Place of birth: Capiatá, Paraguay
- Date of death: 10 January 2007 (aged 24)
- Place of death: Asunción, Paraguay
- Height: 1.78 m (5 ft 10 in)
- Position: Midfielder

Senior career*
Years	Team	Apps	(Gls)
2004–2005	Olimpia	12	(0)
2005	Deportes La Serena	16	(1)
2006	12 de Octubre	31	(4)
2007	Sportivo Trinidense	0	(0)
Total		59	(5)
- * Club domestic league appearances and goals

Sixto Javier Rojas Pérez (28 June 1982 – 10 January 2007) was a Paraguayan footballer who played for clubs in Paraguay and Chile.

== Career ==
Rojas played as an attacking midfielder for the reserve side of Club Olimpia, and made appearances for the Paraguay national under-23 football team, before joining Olimpia's first team. He made his Paraguayan Primera División debut for Olimpia against Club Sol de América on 10 April 2004. He made 26 appearances for Olimpia from April 2004 to May 2005.

Rojas left Olimpia in 2005, moving to Chile to play for Deportes La Serena. One year later he returned to Paraguay where he joined Club 12 de Octubre. He scored four goals in 31 games with 12 de Octubre during 2006.

Rojas had recently signed for newly promoted Primera División club Sportivo Trinidense when he died during preseason training in 2007.
