= Jørgen Hammeken =

Danish footballer (1918-2007)

Personal information
- Date of birth: 20 December 1918
- Date of death: 1 January 2007 (aged 88)

International career
Years	Team	Apps	(Gls)
1946–1947	Denmark	6	(0)

Jørgen Hammeken (20 December 1918 – 1 January 2007) was a Danish footballer. He played in six matches for the Denmark national football team from 1946 to 1947.
