= Deborah Orin =

American journalist

- Born: Deborah Clare Slotkin; April 3, 1947
- Died: January 28, 2007 (aged 59)
- Other names: Deborah Orin-Eilbeck
- Education: Radcliffe College, Northwestern University, Sorbonne
- Occupation: journalist
- Employer(s): Chicago Daily News, Long Island Press, New York Post
- Known for: Washington D.C. bureau chief for New York Post

Deborah Orin (April 3, 1947 – January 28, 2007) was Washington D.C. bureau chief for the New York Post. She was also known by her married name, Deborah Orin-Eilbeck.

Born as Deborah Clare Slotkin to Aaron and Sarah Slotkin, Orin grew up in Stuyvesant Town in New York City. She majored in French and graduated with honors from Radcliffe College. She received a master's degree from Northwestern University and also studied at the Sorbonne.

Orin started her journalism career at the Chicago Daily News and the Long Island Press before joining the New York Post in 1977. She covered every presidential campaign since 1980, and was named Washington bureau chief of the Post in 1988.

She covered four presidencies, and interviewed many leaders and dignitaries, including George H. W. Bush, Barbara Bush, Condoleezza Rice and Colin Powell.

Orin was known for her conservative viewpoint, although the Post's managing editor, Jesse Angelo, was quoted after her death as saying that she was "an equal opportunity offender."

== Death ==
She died at age 59 from stomach cancer.
