= JooJoo =

2010 Linux tablet computer by Fusion Garage

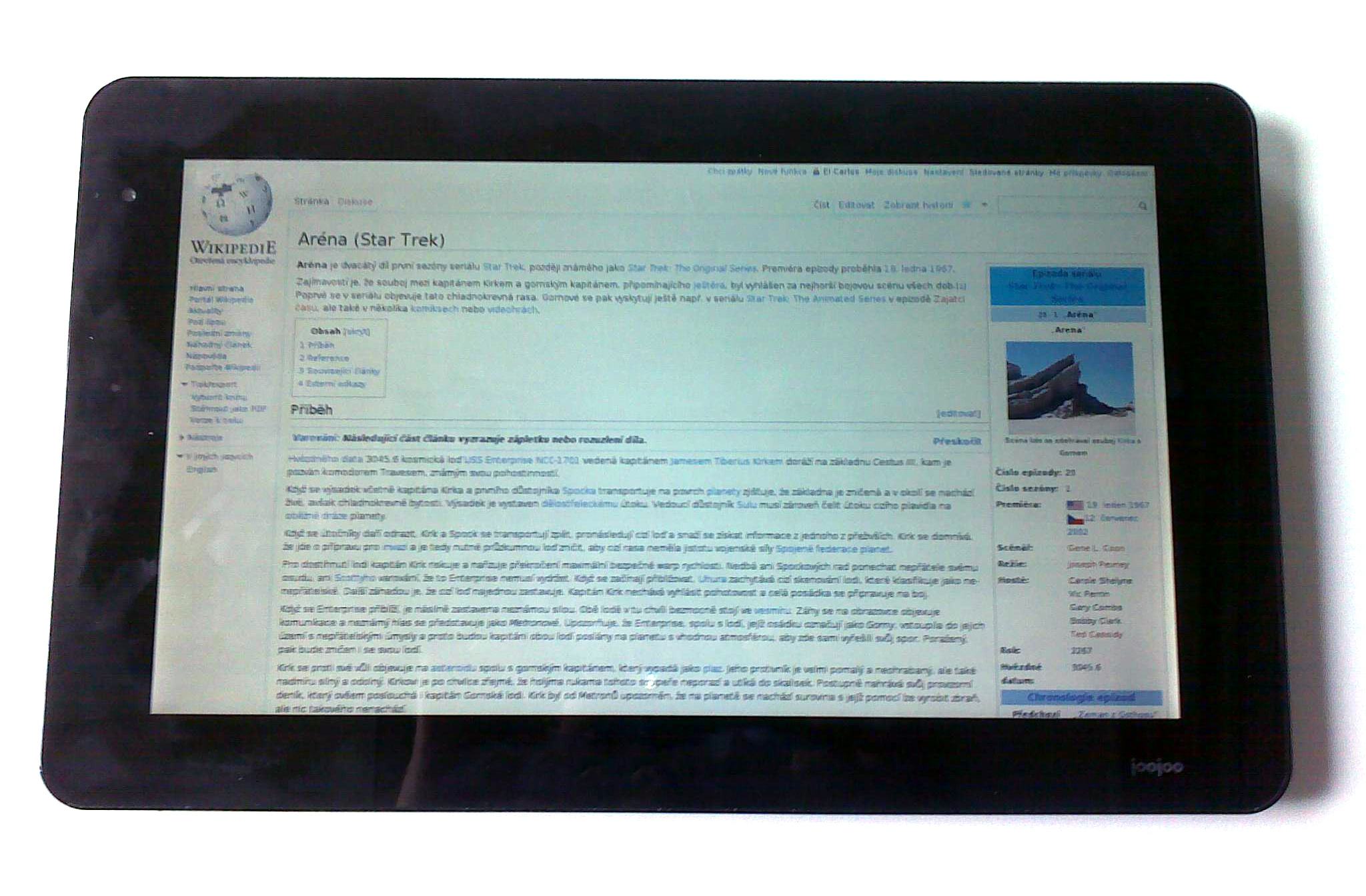
- Developer: Fusion Garage
- Manufacturer: CSL Group
- Type: Internet tablet
- Released: March 25, 2010
- Operating system: Linux
- CPU: 1.6 GHz Intel Atom N270; NVIDIA ION graphics
- Memory: 1GB
- Storage: 4GB SSD
- Display: 12.1" 1366 x 768 LCD touchscreen
- Input: Multi-touch touchscreen display
- Connectivity: Wi-Fi 802.11 b/g, Bluetooth 2.1
- Power: Lithium-ion rechargeable battery
- Dimensions: 18.9mm x 324.5mm x 199mm
- Weight: 2.4 lbs (1.1 kg)

The JooJoo was a Linux-based tablet computer. It was produced by Singapore development studio Fusion Garage. Originally, Fusion Garage was working with Michael Arrington to release it as the CrunchPad, but in November 2009 Fusion Garage informed Arrington it would be selling the product alone. Arrington has responded by filing a lawsuit against Fusion Garage.

== History ==
=== Crunchpad ===
The CrunchPad project was started by Michael Arrington in July 2008, initially aiming for a US$200 tablet, and showed a first prototype (Prototype A) a month later. Beginning 2009, working Prototype B was introduced by the TechCrunch team led by Louis Monier, based on a 12 inch LCD screen, a VIA Nano CPU, Ubuntu Linux and a custom Webkit-based browser. The device was rapidly prototyped by Dynacept and a customized version of the Ubuntu distribution was compiled by Fusion Garage. After announcing Prototype B, there arose a desire for the tablet to come into production. Louis Monier worked closely with Fusion Garage as the team's lead designer.

- April 9, 2009 - Prototype C is shown, looking very much like the original concept pictures. Michael Arrington wrote that the hardware, software and industrial design improvements seen in Prototype C were all driven by Fusion Garage. "... one thing I’ve learned about hardware in the last year is that you need partners to actually make things happen, and the credit for what we saw today goes entirely to the Fusion Garage team.", he said.
- June 3, 2009 - near-final industrial design
- November 17, 2009 - Fusion Garage CEO Chandra Rathakrishnan emails Techcrunch, and informs them "out of the blue" that Fusion Garage's investors want to pull out of the partnership, and that they are under the impression that Techcrunch does not own rights to the project, but are simply helping advertise it.

Initially in 2008, $200 was mentioned as the target price-point. In the first half of 2009, $300 was mentioned as more likely. By the end of July 2009, news stories said the actual price when it would ship in November 2009 would be about $400, putting it in potential competition with netbooks and low-end laptops.

The project generated some press and was mentioned in Washington Post and other media.

In July 2009, it was reported that Arrington founded a company of 14 employees around the tablet (Crunchpad Inc.) in Singapore, and that there would be a public presentation of a finished product later in the month.

By late September 2009, the lack of publicity on the CrunchPad led Dan Frommer of The Business Insider to ask, in an article headline, "Where's The CrunchPad?" Apple and Microsoft were rumored to be working on new tablet computers, receiving more media coverage.

In early October 2009, Popular Mechanics magazine recognized the CrunchPad with an award as one of the top 10 Most Brilliant Products of 2009, "the top 10 most brilliant gadgets, tools and toys that you can buy in 2009." Other organizations questioned the appropriateness of the award as the CrunchPad was not available for purchase at publication time.

On the November 12, 2009, Gillmor Gang podcast, Michael Arrington announced the product is "steamrolling along", that rumors of high prices are untrue, and that the product will probably retail for US$300–400, likely subsidised by features that are sponsored but won't impact negatively on the user experience (similar to Firefox's search bar).

On August 15, 2011, the successor to the JooJoo and a new smartphone were announced after a made-up company "TabCo" unveiled it was, in fact, Fusion Garage. The announcement included a tablet and smartphone named the Grid 10 (10.1 inch tablet) and The Grid 4 (4 inch smartphone), both running GridOS, a fork of the Android operating system.

=== Crunchpad manifesto ===
In the founding July 21, 2008, manifesto "We Want A Dead Simple Web Tablet For $200. Help Us Build It." Michael Arrington wrote:

So let’s design it, build a few and then open source the specs so anyone can create them. If everything works well, we’d then open source the design and software and let anyone build one that wants to.

No further commitments were made in 2009 about making the design open and public, which would make it easier to add additional features such as a standard keyboard connector and increased storage.

=== JooJoo ===
On November 30, 2009, Michael Arrington announced that the CrunchPad project was dead. Three days prior to the planned debut, Fusion Garage CEO Chandra Rathakrishnan had informed him Fusion Garage would be proceeding to sell the pad alone. Arrington claims the intellectual property shared between both companies, so the product could not proceed legally. He said his side "will almost certainly be filing multiple lawsuits against Fusion Garage, and possibly Chandra and his shareholders as individuals, shortly".

On December 7, 2009 - Fusion Garage CEO Chandra Rathakrishnan announced that he is releasing what had been developed as the CrunchPad and which he is now calling the "JooJoo", and that it will be available for pre-sale December 11, 2009 for $499 USD.

On December 10, 2009 Michael Arrington/Techcrunch filed a lawsuit against Fusion Garage in Federal court.

On February 1, 2010, Fusion Garage CEO Chandrasekar Rathakrishnan announced that JooJoo pre-orders had increased following the debut of the Apple iPad, and that additional funding of $10 million had been obtained. He also announced that Fusion Garage was in the process of forming a partnership with a mobile phone manufacturer that would handle the production of the device.

On February 3, 2010, Fusion Garage announced that the manufacturing of JooJoo tablets had begun as part of a new agreement with CSL Group. In exchange for absorbing manufacturing costs of the JooJoo, CSL Group would take a percentage of profits from the sale of the devices. CEO Chandrasekar Rathakrishnan stated that JooJoo shipments would reach customers by late February, and that the device would support Adobe Flash at launch.

On February 26, 2010, Fusion Garage announced a manufacturing delay of the JooJoo tablet, citing an issue fine tuning the touch sensitivity of the capacitive screen. JooJoo tablets are now to ship out on March 25, 2010, and all pre-order customers are to be provided with a free accessory to compensate for the delay.

On November 11, 2010, Fusion Garage announced that Joojoo tablet at its current iteration is at “its end of life” and the company will be exploring several new platforms that will not have backward compatibility.

On December 19, 2011, rumors said that Fusion Garage will discontinue business and may be bankrupt.

On January 9, 2012, Fusion Garage confirmed that the company had gone into liquidation owing creditors $40 million.

== Litigation ==
On November 30, 2009, Arrington said the CrunchPad project had ended in disagreement between himself and Fusion Garage. On December 7, 2009, Fusion Garage CEO Chandra Rathakrishnan said his company would release the CrunchPad as the JooJoo, and that customers could preorder it on December 11, 2009, for 499 USD. On December 10, 2009, Arrington and Techcrunch filed a lawsuit against Fusion Garage in U.S. federal court, accusing the firm of fraud and deceit, misappropriation of business ideas, breach of fiduciary duty, unfair competition, and violations of the Lanham Act. On March 30, 2010, the lawsuit revealed that only 90 pre-orders for the JooJoo had been placed before it began shipping.

Kernel hacker Matthew Garrett filed a complaint with US Customs and Border Protection against Fusion Garage for copyright infringement, since the company shipped GPL software without making the required offer of source code. The issue was resolved in January 2011 when Fusion Garage started providing the required source code at their web site.

== See also ==
- Tablet PC
- Adam tablet
- ExoPC
- HP Slate
- iPad
- Sakshat Tablet
- WeTab
