= Comscore =

American media analytics company

Comscore, Inc.
- Type: Public
- Traded as: Nasdaq: SCOR; Russell 2000 component
- Industry: Analytics
- Founded: July 26, 1999; 27 years ago
- Founders: Magid Abraham; Gian Fulgoni
- Headquarters: Reston, Virginia, U.S.
- Key people: Jon Carpenter (CEO); Bill Livek (vice chairman)
- Revenue: ▲US$367 million (2021)
- Operating income: ▼US$−29 million (2021)
- Net income: ▼US$−50 million (2021)
- Total assets: ▼US$663 million (2021)
- Total equity: ▲US$223 million (2021)
- Number of employees: 1,355 (January 2022)
- Subsidiaries: Rentrak
- Website: comscore.com

Comscore, Inc. is an American-based global media measurement and analytics company providing marketing data and analytics to enterprises, advertising agencies, brand marketers, and publishers.

== History ==
Comscore was founded in July 1999 in Reston, Virginia. The company was co-founded by Gian Fulgoni, who was for many years the CEO of market research company Information Resources, Inc. (IRI) and Magid Abraham, who was also an ex-IRI employee and was president in the mid-1990s.

On March 30, 2007, Comscore made an initial public offering of shares on the Nasdaq, using the symbol "SCOR".

On February 11, 2014, Comscore announced the appointment of Serge Matta as chief executive officer, effective March 1.

Co-founder Gian Fulgoni, who had been chairman emeritus since 2014, replaced Serge Matta as chief executive officer on August 10, 2016. On September 2, 2016, Comscore received a letter from NASDAQ that it was in danger of being delisted from the exchange on September 12 unless Comscore filed its 2015 annual report (form 10-K) and reports for the first two quarters of 2016. On February 6, 2017, Comscore announced they would not meet the NASDAQ-imposed deadline to "complete its financial restatement and regain compliance with Nasdaq's listing requirements." Because of this missed deadline, "Comscore's common stock may be suspended from trading and delisted from Nasdaq." If Comscore is delisted from NASDAQ and their trading is suspended, they advise they intend to "be quoted on the OTC Markets." In November 2017, According to the reports, Gian Fulgoni co-founder and CEO retired.

On April 23, 2018, it was announced that Bryan Wiener was appointed as the company's chief executive officer, effective May 30. Wiener had previously been chairman of 360i, a 1,000-person advertising agency known for its ability to help brands capitalize on change through innovation and a data-driven approach to marketing. In October 2018, the company revised its branding, updating its logo and changing its name stylization from "comScore" to "comscore", although it continued to use "Comscore" as well.

On April 1, 2019, CEO Bryan Wiener announced that he, along with president Sarah Hofstetter would be stepping down from their respective roles at Comscore, citing irreconcilable differences in strategy with the company's board.

On November 5, 2019, Bill Livek was appointed as Chief Executive Officer and Executive Vice Chairman. Prior to joining Comscore, Livek was Vice Chairman & Chief Executive Officer at Rentrak, where he spearheaded the next generation of products to precisely measure movies and TV. In February 2022, Livek announced he was going to retire and step down as CEO once the board found a replacement.

=== Mergers and acquisitions ===
Comscore acquired Media Metrix in a deal announced in June 2002. Earlier, the Federal Trade Commission announced it would block a bid by NetRatings to acquire Media Metrix.

Media Metrix originated as PC Meter, a business unit of market research company NPD Group, and began publishing statistics in January 1996. In July 1997, it changed its name to Media Metrix. In October 1998, Media Metrix merged with a rival, Relevant Knowledge. The company went public as NASDAQ:MMXI in May 1999, reaching a market cap of $135 million on its first day of trading. In June 2000, the company acquired Jupiter Communications for $414 million in stock and changed its name to Jupiter Media Metrix. In the aftermath of the dot-com bubble collapse and associated downturn in internet marketing spending, Jupiter sold the Media Metrix service to rival Comscore for $1.5 million in June 2002.

In May 2008, Comscore announced its acquisition of M:Metrics, a company that measured mobile content consumption. The transaction involved a cash payment of $44.3 million and the issue of approximately 50,000 options to purchase shares of Comscore common stock to some M:Metrics unvested option holders.

Comscore announced in October 2009 the acquisition of Certifica, an internet marketing company based in Santiago, Chile. The acquisition enhanced Comscore’s presence in the Latin American market.

In February 2010, Comscore announced an agreement to purchase the ARSgroup, headquartered in Evansville, Indiana.

On July 1, 2010, Comscore announced that it had acquired the products division of Nexius, Inc.

Comscore then acquired Nedstat for approximately $36.7 million on September 1, 2010.

In February 2015 Comscore US entered into a partnership with Kantar owned by WPP with an equity stake purchase.

On May 5, 2015 Comscore announced that it had acquired Proximic, a California based analytics company. Several years later in March, 2023 Comscore announced a rebrand of their programmatic targeting business under the name Proximic by Comscore, utilizing the capabilities from the May 2015 Proximic acquisition.

In September 2015, Comscore and Rentrak announced a merger of the two companies. The move was meant to combine Comscore's digital media measurement capabilities with the TV measurement capabilities of Rentrak to create a cross-platform media measurement firm, perhaps capable of challenging Nielsen N.V. in the media measurement space. Under terms of the agreement, Comscore agreed to acquire Rentrak in an all-stock deal valued at about $732 million, with Rentrak shareholders receiving 1.15 shares of Comscore per owned share of Rentrak. The Comscore-Rentrak deal closed on February 1, 2016, with the final transaction being valued at $767.7 million. Comscore later sold the movie division to private equity firm Advaya for $70M in 2026, which reinstated the Rentrak brand.

In December 2021, Comscore acquired Shareablee, a social media marketing analytics and measurement company.

== Data collection and reporting ==
Comscore maintains a group of users who have monitoring software (with brands including PermissionResearch, OpinionSquare and VoiceFive Networks) installed on their computers. In exchange for joining the Comscore research panels, users are presented with various benefits, including computer security software, Internet data storage, virus scanning, and chances to win cash or prizes.

Comscore estimates that two million users are part of the monitoring program. However, self-selected populations, no matter how large, may not be representative of the population as a whole. To obtain the most accurate data, Comscore adjusts the statistics using weights to make sure that each population segment is adequately represented. To calculate these weights, Comscore regularly recruits panelists using random digit dialing and other offline recruiting methods to accurately determine how many users are online, aggregated by geography, income, and age. Correcting the Comscore data requires having accurate demographics about the larger pool of users. However, some Comscore users are recruited without being asked to give demographic information and, in other cases, users may not be truthful about their demographics. To ensure the accuracy of the data, Comscore verifies its users' demographics during the course of measuring statistical data.

The corrected data is used to generate reports on topics ranging from web traffic to video streaming activity and consumer buying power.

In April 2020, Comscore launched a faster local TV rating service -- with a turnaround of 48 hours, as opposed to the previous two weeks span it takes TV stations to get TV ratings data.

== Products ==
=== Unified Digital Measurement ===
In May 2009, Comscore introduced Unified Digital Measurement (UDM), a digital audience measurement tool that blended panel and census-based measurement approaches. The methodology calculates audience reach without being affected by cookie deletion and cookie blocking/rejection.

=== Campaign measurement ===
Comscore debuted Campaign Essentials in 2010 to measure how digital campaigns are reaching their audiences. In March 2012, Comscore launched validated Campaign Essentials (vCE), which introduced the notion of “validated” impressions. In January 2013, Comscore announced that it had evaluated 4,000 campaigns for clients covering more than 75 advertising agencies.

=== Comscore Content Measurement ===
In 2025, Comscore announced the Comscore Content Measurement (CCM) product, which combines audience insights about streaming and traditional TV content across social, mobile, and desktop. The product gives media publishers information about audience segments based on demographic, interests, and content consumption patterns to facilitate distribution deals and programmatic partnerships.

== Criticism ==
In 2006, Ben Edelman, a Harvard researcher, alleged that there were cases where Comscore software had been installed on users' computers without their knowledge. Comscore admitted that it was in discussion with a spyware firm called DollarRevenue but said that no contract was ever signed, and that once it realized DollarRevenue was distributing Comscore's software, months later, it took steps to prevent the DollarRevenue-distributed software from sending data to Comscore. Stanford IT notes that the monitoring software has been bundled with file sharing program iMesh without users being aware of it, although Comscore's relationship with iMesh was short-lived and occurred several years ago.

In the past, the software forwarded users' internet traffic through Comscore proxy servers, provoking criticism about speed performance. As a result, several universities and banks took steps to block the proxy servers.

In June 2010, a warning about Mac Spyware being launched from free applications like screensavers, from security company Intego was reported in the media and implicated VoiceFive, Inc. as the source of certain alleged spyware software. VoiceFive, Inc. has become compliant with the EU-U.S. Privacy Shield Framework, the Swiss-U.S. Privacy Shield Framework, as well as the General Data Protection Regulation (GDPR).

Additionally, noted blogger and angel investor Jason Calacanis claimed that Comscore was running an 'extorting ring' by vastly undercounting publisher traffic numbers and forcing them to pay fees for direct measurement via a tracking pixel. Comscore responded to these allegations by offering their direct measurement tracking pixel to long-tail web publishers for free.

=== SEC findings ===
In 2019, Comscore Inc. and its former CEO Serge Matta were charged with engaging in a fraudulent scheme to overstate revenue by approximately $50 million and making false and misleading statements about key performance metrics. The United States Securities and Exchange Commission (SEC) found that Comscore and Matta made false and misleading public disclosures regarding the company’s customer base and flagship product and that Matta lied to Comscore's internal accountants and external audit firm in order. This enabled Comscore to artificially exceed its analysts' consensus revenue target in seven consecutive quarters and create the illusion of smooth and steady growth in Comscore's business. The company has replaced the former CEO and other senior executives; its new management team has settled the SEC charges without admitting or denying wrongdoing in September 2019 for $5 million. Two years before the charges, Comscore had restated its financial statements and rectified all concerns of its accounting practices around revenue recognition. According to the company, it has since implemented remedial efforts, including new internal control procedures and policies and new compliance systems. Its new compliance program was recognized as the "Best Compliance and Ethics Program (Small to Mid-Cap)" at the 12th Corporate Governance Awards in 2019.

== Awards ==
- Magid Abraham, Comscore's co-founder, received the 2009 Charles Coolidge Parlin Marketing Research Award at the 2009 American Marketing Association Marketing Research Conference.
- Comscore was selected as a winner of the 2009 Chicago Innovation Awards for its creative development of AdEffx in October 2009.
- In June 2009, Comscore and the GSM Association won the M.E.F. Award for Business Intelligence in Mobile Media.
- Comscore was rated as the preferred audience measurement service by 50.4 percent of respondents to the William Blair & Company 6th semiannual survey of the members of the Chicago Interactive Marketing Association (CIMA).
- Comscore was ranked as the 15th largest U.S. market research firm based on 2008 domestic revenues, growing faster than each of the largest 25 research firms, according to the 2008 Honomichl Top 50 report.
- Comscore was selected by World Economic Forum as one of 2007's 47 most innovative companies.
- Comscore co-founder Magid Abraham was honored with the Eighth Annual Buck Weaver Award for Marketing. The award recognizes individuals who have made important contributions to the advancement of theory and practice in marketing science.
- In 2014, Comscore was awarded the "New Technology of the Year Award" by Digital Analytics Association. With its multi-platform capability, Digital Analytix is able to unify users across devices and platforms using Comscore’s proprietary browser unification methodology.
- Comscore received an Innovation Award at the Perspectives 2018 Conference hosted by Skillsoft and SumTotal. Comscore was named the winner in Learning Program of the Year for its demonstrated success, innovation and expertise in learning and development.
- Comscore won the Advertising Solutions category at the 2018 IAB Europe Research Awards, which recognizes the industry's best digital research projects. ComScore’s ‘Free Viewability’ allowed digital media buyers a free service for measuring both video and display campaigns.
- Comscore's legal department was recognized as a regional winner in the 2018 ACC National Chapter Corporate Counsel Awards. Among the reasons cited were Comscore's success at designing a comprehensive corporate governance structure, creating a data privacy division, and establishing cross-training initiatives.

== Alliances ==
The Coalition for Innovative Media Measurement (CIMM) and Comscore work together to measure three-screen users and their behavior with content and advertising across television, Internet, and mobile.

== See also ==
- Alexa Internet
- Compete.com
- Customer knowledge
- Hitwise
- Nielsen ratings
- Quantcast
- VideoAmp
