= Retail Solutions Inc. =

RSi, Retail Solutions Inc
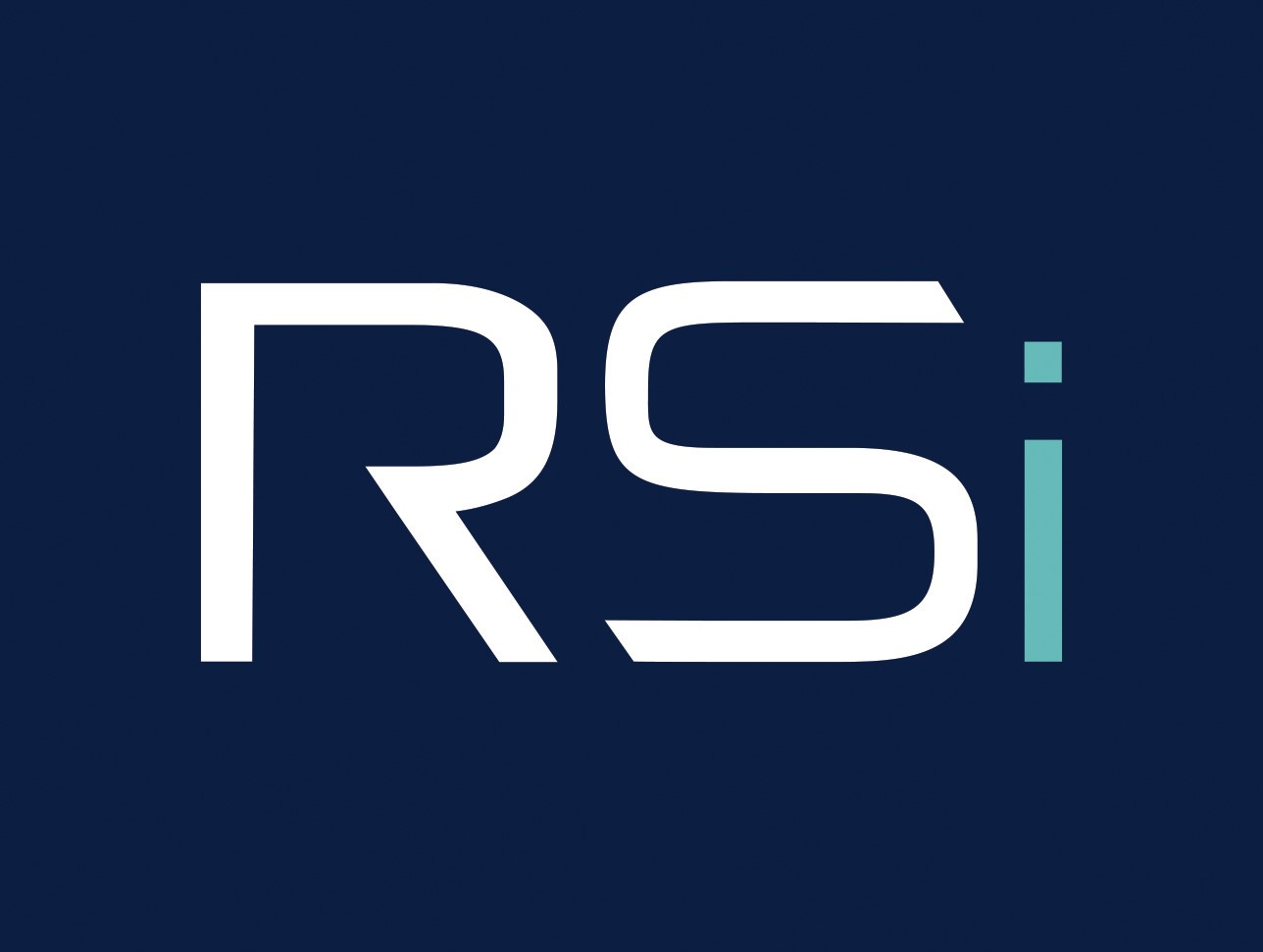
- Industry: software
- Founded: 2003
- Headquarters: Mountain View, CA
- Area served: worldwide
- Key people: Bert Clement, CEO; John Neale, CFO
- Number of employees: 400+
- Website: www.retailsolutions.com

Retail Solutions Inc (RSi) is a software company based in Mountain View, California, that provides software-as-a-service products for data management, reporting and business intelligence, and point of sale applications. The company started out selling radio-frequency identification software before moving into its current business. In October 2020, RSi was acquired by IRI Worldwide.

== History ==
Founded in 2003 as T3Ci, the company started out selling radio-frequency identification (RFID) software before moving into its current business. Wal-Mart had required all of its suppliers to place RFID tags with electronic product codes on their products in 2003. Jonathan Golovin, Richard Swan, Peter Rieman, and Shantha Mohan decided to start a company that would analyze the data from RFID tags. Later that year, T3Ci, which stood for “The Tag Tracking Company, Incorporated,” was founded. T3Ci developed software that would read and understand electronic product code (EPC) data, allowing the information to be used by retailers and their suppliers (mostly consumer packaged goods (CPG) companies) to improve sales.

In October 2004, T3Ci received funding of $9.4 million in a Series A round from Venrock, Red Rock Ventures and SAP Ventures. In 2005, it received a Series B round of $8.8 million led by Bessemer Venture Partners. Early in 2005, T3Ci and Procter & Gamble signed an agreement for developing and exploring RFID and EPC technology in the supply chain. The company subsequently opened an office in Bentonville, Arkansas, while expanding its operation in California. T3Ci processed its billionth RFID tag read in February 2007, and by the end of the year, T3Ci had over thirty customers, including four of the top five CPG manufacturers. The company also claimed that revenues had grown 150% from the previous year.

In 2007, Wal-Mart ended its RFID mandate. In December 2007, T3Ci acquired VeriSign’s Retail Data Services business unit, forming Retail Solutions Inc., today’s company. Instead of analyzing RFID tags, Retail Solutions, Inc. (RSi) focused on "demand signal repositories" and point-of-sale data from retailers. The company formed cooperative relationships with CVS, Walgreens and Delhaize USA.

RSi’s first Chinese subsidiary was opened in Shanghai in April 2008. That same year, the first versions of the company’s Retail Visibility and Retail Intelligence products were released as new versions of RSi’s “Retail Execution Management” platform. In 2011, RSi acquired Retail Insight, a British retail/consumer goods expert.

In January 2012, RSi launched Vendor Pulse in cooperation with Delhaize Belgium, a Belgian retailer. As part of the agreement, RSi was required to offer "raw daily data" to suppliers at no charge to the supplier. RSi also offers web-based reports from a portal for purchase that incorporates this daily data. A few months later in May 2012, RSi opened for business in Moscow, Russia.

== Retailers ==
Presently, RSi receives point-of-sale data from over 225 retailers, including Ahold USA, Family Dollar, Food Lion, Delhaize Belgium, Delhaize America, Safeway and Walgreens, sharing their data with their suppliers, using RSi as a trusted third party. Food Lion has over 1300 stores in eleven states. In June 2008, Food Lion started using RSi’s Demand Signal Management (DSM) to disclose its point-of-sale data by store, by day, and by stock-keeping unit (SKU) as well as alternate data involving shipping/ordering and receipts. According to Food Lion’s supply chain manager, the data-sharing program with RSi reduced the number of unsellable items and improved promotion product allocation.

Another retailer working with RSi is Hannaford Supermarkets, which has over 160 stores in the U.S. In December 2008, it started using DSM to share its point-of-sale data with its suppliers. Hannaford hoped that this program would improve the shopper experience and encouraged all of its suppliers to participate.

Walgreens also participated in a data-sharing program with its suppliers via RSi. By March 2009, 120 suppliers had joined the program. Delhaize Belgium, another retailer, launched its Vendor Pulse program, powered by RSi, in January 2012 to share sales and inventory data with its suppliers to better understand their customers.

== Community ==
In September 2008, Retail Solutions became a participant in the USTC’s (University of Science and Technology of China) Internship Foundation program. As part of this program, students were required to finish an internship with one of the participating companies to graduate.

In September 2009, Retail Solutions instituted an internship program for college students in Rhode Island majoring in business and computer science. RSi worked with eleven students from Brown University and Providence College. The internship program included executive dashboard development, expanding training modules, and customer satisfaction surveys. Some of the interns have continued with RSi as full-time employees, while others have moved on to PricewaterhouseCoopers, Morgan Stanley, and Apple.

For customers, RSi offers monthly webinars that provide multiple types of training on the company’s platforms.

The company holds semiannual meetings for user groups that focus on retailer initiatives, customer user case presentations that leverage downstream data, and RSi’s product roadmap. The user group sessions also include interactive user case trainings-centric approaches to the retailer initiatives. The user groups are held at Chicago, San Francisco, Minneapolis, Charlotte, Providence, and Bentonville. RSi introduced its first user group in 2009, and with the success of these events now hosts over 10 per year.
