= Magid Abraham =

American entrepreneur

Magid M. Abraham
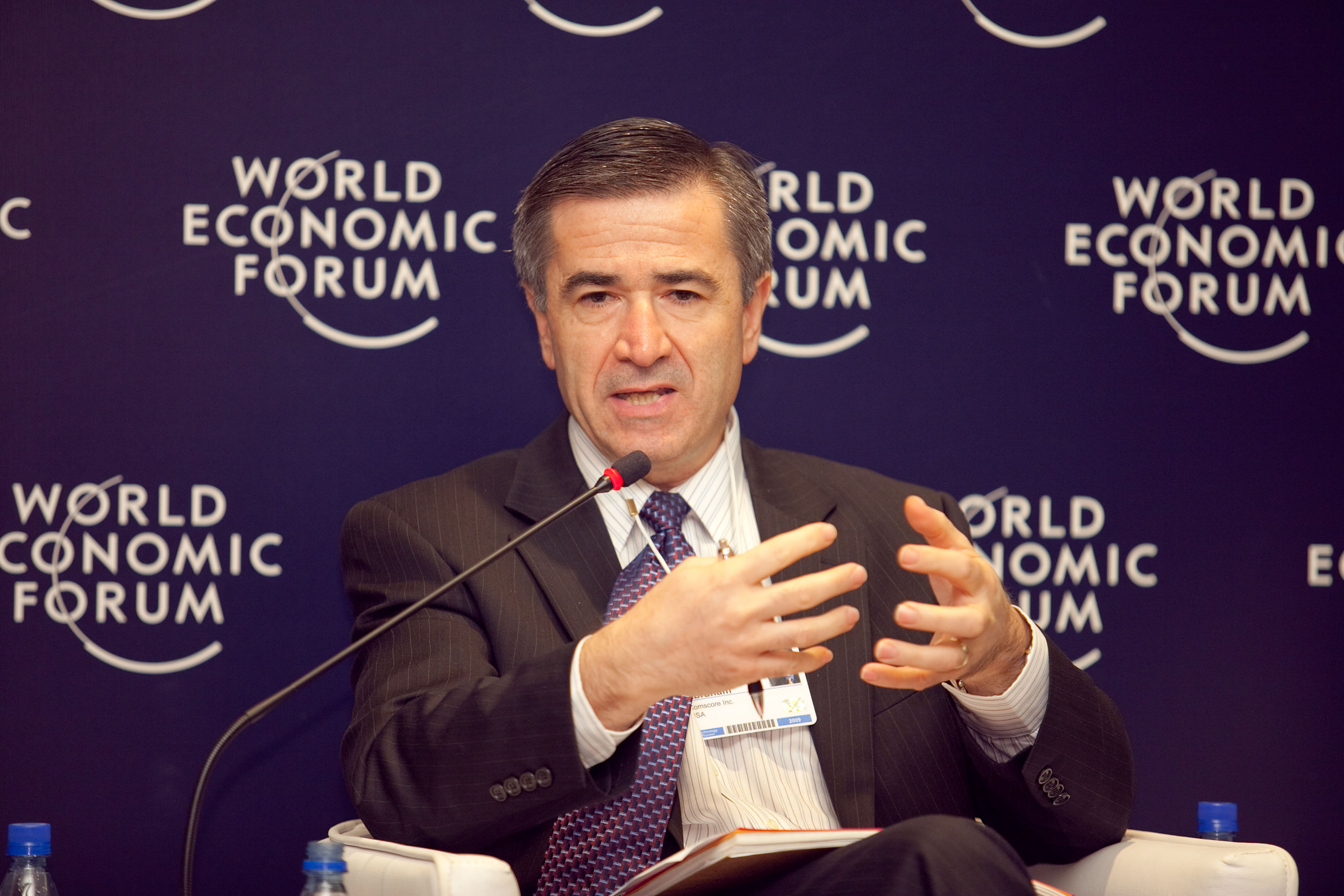
- Born: April 13, 1958 (age 68); Machghara, Lebanon
- Education: École polytechnique (BA); Massachusetts Institute of Technology (MBA, PhD)
- Occupation: CEO of Comscore
- Awards: Ernst and Young, Entrepreneur Hall of Fame

Magid M. Abraham (born April 13, 1958) is an entrepreneur and expert on market research, consumer modeling, and information systems. He has held several executive positions, two of which were within companies he founded.

Abraham authored articles in academic and industry journals, including the Harvard Business Review, Journal of Marketing Research, and Marketing Science. He is a speaker at marketing industry conferences.

== Early life ==
Abraham was born in Machghara, a small town in Lebanon, where he was raised on his father’s fruit farm. As a child, his interests in school included math, science, and physics. He attended high school in Lebanon, followed by Paris’ engineering university, École polytechnique. He went to the United States to attend the MIT Sloan School of Management, where he graduated with an MBA in 1981 and later a PhD in operations research.

== Career ==
Abraham joined Information Resources, Inc. (IRI) in 1985. He was IRI president and chief operating officer from 1993 to 1994, and vice chairman of the board of directors from 1994 until 1995. At IRI, Abraham designed marketing applications that eventually became standards of CPG marketing practice, as referenced in his articles 'Promoter: An Automated Promotion Evaluation System', 1987, Marketing Science and 'An Implemented System for Improving Promotion Productivity Using Store Scanner Data', 1993, Marketing Science.

Abraham was founder and CEO of Paragren Technologies in 1995, which became part of Siebel Systems.

In 1999, Abraham co-founded comScore, an Internet market intelligence company where he was CEO for 14 years and took public in 2007. comScore was selected as a “Technology Pioneer” by the World Economic Forum before the forum’s annual conference in Davos in 2007. In 2016, Abraham stepped down as executive chairman and resigned from comScore's board of directors and became the executive chairman of APX Labs (later renamed Upskill). Linda Abraham became vice chair. During the same year, Abraham became a visiting scholar at Stanford and taught for three years at the Graduate School of Business.

In January 2008, Abraham joined the board of directors of Milo.com, a company founded by his son Jack Abraham which was acquired by eBay in 2010 for $75M.

Abraham co-founded NeuraWell, a mental health therapeutics company, and is its CEO.

== Awards and recognition ==
In 1996, Abraham was awarded the Paul Green Award by the AMA for an article that he co-authored in the Journal of Marketing Research in 1995 described as showing “the most potential to contribute to the practice of marketing research and research in marketing." That award was validated 5 years after the initial publication, with the AMA William F. O'Dell Award in 2000 recognizing research which made a significant, long-term contribution to the marketing discipline.

- 2016 : Advertising Research Foundation's Great Mind Awards: Lifetime Achievement Award.
- 2011 : MIT Sloan's Buck Weaver Award, for theory and practice in marketing science
- 2009 : American Marketing Association, Charles Coolidge Parlin Marketing Research Award
- 2008 : Ernst and Young, Entrepreneur Hall of Fame
- 2008 : World Economic Forum, “Technology Pioneer”
- 2000 : American Marketing Association, William F. O’Dell Award
- 1992 : "Top 40 Under 40" awarded by Crain’s Chicago Business, given to 40 business professionals in Chicago annually.

== Personal life ==
He is the father of Jack Abraham the founding and managing partner of startup studio and investment fund Atomic.

In April 2022, Abraham and his wife purchased a 5,968 square feet condo at Jeffery Soffer's Turnberry Ocean Club in Iseles beach for a reported $14.3 million.
