= Michael Burrows (computer scientist) =

British computer scientist

- Born: 1963 (age 62–63)
- Citizenship: United Kingdom
- Education: University College London (BSc); University of Cambridge (PhD)
- Known for: Burrows–Wheeler transform
- Awards: Fellow of the Royal Society (2013); SIGOPS Mark Weiser Award (2003); IET Achievement Medal (2019)
- Scientific career
- Fields: Computer Science
- Workplaces: Google; University of Cambridge; Digital Equipment Corporation; AltaVista; Microsoft
- Thesis: Efficient Data Sharing (1988)
- Doctoral advisor: David Wheeler
- Website: research.google.com/pubs/author24014.html

Michael Burrows, FRS (born 1963) is a British computer scientist, one of the creators of AltaVista, and co-author of the paper that first described the Burrows–Wheeler transform. Born in Britain, as of 2018 he lives in the United States, although he remains a British citizen.

== Education ==
Burrows studied Electronic Engineering with Computer Science at University College London and then completed his PhD in the Computer Laboratory, University of Cambridge, where he was a postgraduate student of Churchill College, Cambridge supervised by David Wheeler.

== Career ==
Upon leaving Cambridge, he moved to USA and worked at the Systems Research Center (SRC) at Digital Equipment Corporation (DEC) where, with Paul Flaherty and Louis Monier, he was one of the creators of AltaVista.

Following Compaq's acquisition of DEC, Burrows worked briefly for Microsoft preventing spamming. Shortly thereafter he went to Google.

After his early work at the University of Cambridge, where he researched microkernels and basic matters of security, he went on to enlarge upon that work as systems were deployed at large scale on the Internet.

During his employment at Google, Burrows has studied concurrency & synchronisation and programming in the large – especially with respect to the C++ language. He designed the Chubby lock service for coordination between server nodes in large distributed systems.

== Awards and honours ==
Burrows was elected a Fellow of the Royal Society in 2013. His nomination reads:

Dr Michael Burrows is distinguished for his pioneering work on web search and indexing. He was one of the designers of the early search engine Altavista. He was also one of the pioneers of the application of formal logic to the verification of security protocols. He has made seminal contributions to many other areas of computer science and engineering ranging from compression through synchronisation to performance measurement. He is one of the engineers who led the design of Google's distributed computing infrastructure.

Burrows received the SIGOPS Mark Weiser Award in 2003.

He received the IET Achievement Medal (Computer Engineering) in 2019.
