= Proximic by Comscore =

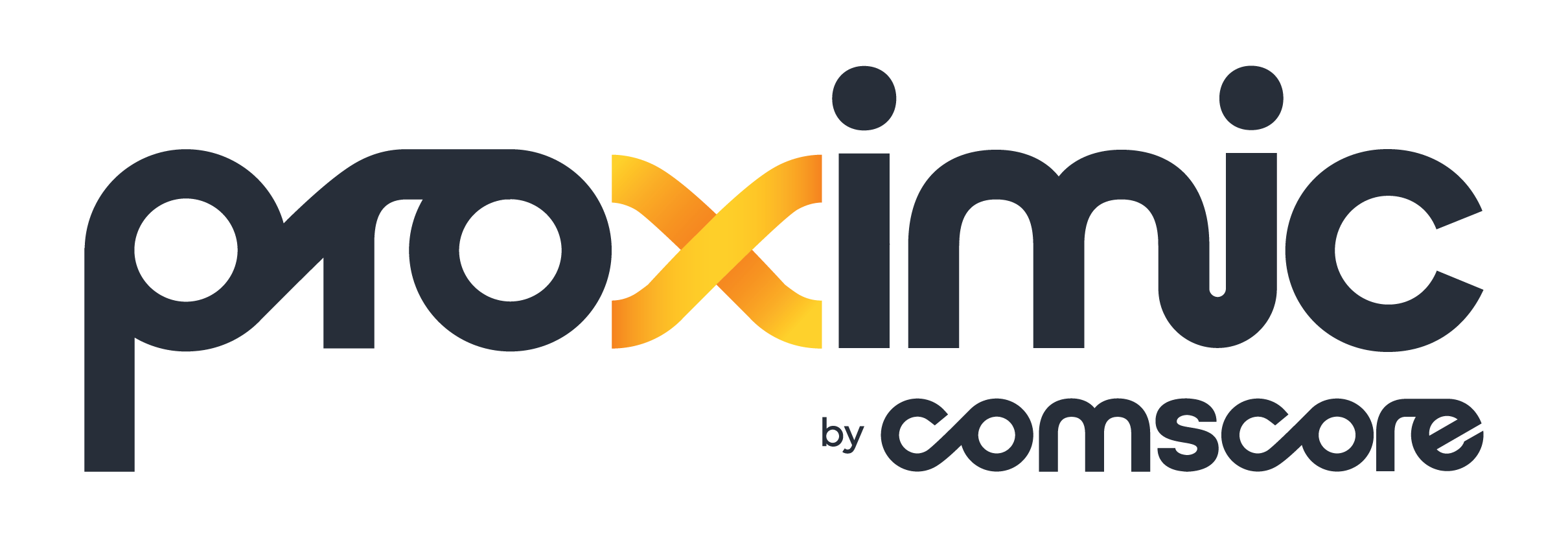
- Type: Division
- Industry: Online Advertising; Contextual Advertising; Advertising Data Services
- Founded: 2006; 20 years ago
- Founder: Philipp Pieper; Thomas Nitsche
- Key people: Philipp Pieper – CEO; Louis Monier – Chief Scientist; Rodney Mayers – SVP Business Development; Felix Hansen – VP Product
- Services: Contextual Data, Brand Protection, Audience Interest Data
- Parent: Comscore
- Website: www.proximic.com

Proximic by Comscore is a division of Comscore that provides on programmatic targeting solutions for advertisers, agencies and publishers in the advertising industry.

== History ==
Proximic launched for alpha testing in late 2007. In 2010, the company integrated with the real-time ad platform AppNexus and started to offer its contextual data services to the display advertisers and agencies.

The company was based in Palo Alto, with research and development facilities in Munich. The company's CEO Philipp Pieper co-founded the company with mathematician Thomas Nitsche. Thomas Nitsche and Elmar Henne, Proximic's chief architect, developed the Mephisto Chess Computer. Chief Scientist was Louis Monier, cofounder of the AltaVista search engine.

In 2015, Proximic was acquired by Comscore. In 2023, Comscore announced a rebrand of their programmatic targeting business under the name Proximic by Comscore utilizing the capabilities from the May 2015 Proximic acquisition. The company currently operates as a division of Comscore, Inc.

In 2023, Proximic by Comscore was named a Programmatic Power Player of the year by AdExchanger.
