= Fulgoni =

Fulgoni is a surname. Notable people with the surname include:

- Gian Fulgoni (born 1948), British businessman, entrepreneur, and market research consultant
- Sara Fulgoni (fl. early 21st century), British operatic mezzo-soprano
