= Shantha Mohan =

Indian-American Businessperson and writer

- Born: India
- Occupations: Business person, Engineer

Academic background
- Education: Ph.D, B.E.
- Alma mater: Carnegie Mellon University, College of Engineering, Guindy
- Thesis: Semilinear programming: applications and implementation
- Doctoral advisor: Gerald L. Thompson
- Business background
- Organizations: Retail Solutions Inc., Carnegie Mellon Silicon Valley

Shantha Mohan is an Indian-American businessperson and a writer. She is known for cofounding Retail Solutions Inc. and authoring books on leadership and pioneering Indian Women Engineers. Following retirement, she has been serving as an instructor at Carnegie Mellon Silicon Valley, where she teachers career strategies and leadership and mentors students and staff.

== Early life and education ==
Shantha Mohan was born in India. She graduated from College of Engineering, Guindy in 1971 with B.E (Hons) in Electronics and Communication Engineering. She received her PhD in Operations Management in 1985 from Tepper Business School, Carnegie Mellon University.

== Career ==
After her PhD, she went on to work at Consilium Inc, which was later acquired by Applied Materials. She worked as VP of Software Engineering with responsibility for the development of manufacturing execution systems such as FAB300.

In 2003, she cofounded T3Ci (The Tag Tracking Company) along with Jonathan Golovin, Richard Swan and Peter Rieman. It specialized in analyzing RFID data. But soon after Walmart stopped its mandate of using RFID tags, the company pivoted towards providing software for business intelligence and point-of-sale applications. They established themselves as Retail Solutions Inc. Shantha worked as chief development officer of the company whose customers included over 500 consumer products companies. She retired in 2016. RSI was acquired by Information Resources, Inc. in 2020.

Following her retirement, she has been serving as an instructor at Integrated Innovation Institute, CMU Silicon Valley. She contributes to curricula and mentors students' projects.

== Writing ==
After her retirement, she has focused on writing books on the role of women in engineering and leadership. Roots and Wings tells the inspiring stories of the first female engineers of India including Ayyalasomayajula Lalitha who graduated from College of Engineering, Guindy, between 1943 and 1971. In Leadership Lessons with Beatles, she shared the lessons of leadership from her own experience, relating each lesson to a Beatles song.

== Publications ==
=== Books ===
- Natarajan, Prashant; Rogers, Bob; Dixon, Edward; Christensen, Jonas; Borne, Kirk; Wilkinson, Leland; Mohan, Shantha (2022). Demystifying AI for the enterprise: a playbook for business value and digital transformation. New York, NY Milton Park, Abingdon, Oxon: Routledge, Taylor & Francis Group. ISBN 9781032145204.
- Mohan, Shantha (31 August 2018). Roots and Wings : Inspiring Stories of Indian Women in Engineering (1st ed.). Notion Press. ISBN 978-1-64429-132-0.
- Mohan, Shantha (3 May 2022). Leadership Lessons with The Beatles: Actionable Tips and Tools for Becoming Better at Leading. Productivity Press. doi:10.4324/9781003267546. ISBN 978-1-003-26754-6.

=== Patents ===
- US patent 7850081, Richard James Swan, Shantha Mohan, David Sun, Alexander Varshavsky, Karthik Mohanram; Mohan, Shantha & Sun, David et al., "Apparatus and method for authenticating products", issued 2010-12-14, assigned to Fleet Connect Solutions LLC
- US patent 8464947B2, Richard James Swan, Shantha Mohan, David Sun, Alexander Varshavsky, Karthik Mohanram; Mohan, Shantha & Sun, David et al., "System and method for authenticating products", issued 2013-06-18, assigned to Fleet Connect Solutions LLC
- US patent 7174230, John F. Arackaparambil, Tom ChiBilly Chow, Patrick M. D'Souza, Parris Hawkins, Charles Huang, Jett Jensen, Badri N. Krishnamurthy, Pradeep M. Kulkarni, Prakash M. Kulkarni, Wen Fong Lin, Shantha Mohan, Bishnu Nandy, Huey-Shin Yuan, "Computer integrated manufacturing techniques", issued 2007-02-06, assigned to Applied Materials Inc

=== Selected papers ===
- Aytug, Haldun; Lawley, Mark A.; McKay, Kenneth; Mohan, Shantha; Uzsoy, Reha (16 February 2005). "Executing production schedules in the face of uncertainties: A review and some future directions". European Journal of Operational Research. 161 (1): 86–110. doi:10.1016/j.ejor.2003.08.027. ISSN 0377-2217.
- Gaimon, Cheryl; Mohan, Shantha; Thompson, Gerald L. (1 January 1987). "A network approach to cohort personnel planning using cross-sectional data". Computers & Operations Research. 14 (3): 183–196. doi:10.1016/0305-0548(87)90021-9. ISSN 0305-0548.
- Mohan, Shantha (July 1996). <269::AID-SMR133>3.0.CO;2-V "Evolutionary Method of Delivery as Applied to a Large Re-engineering Effort". Journal of Software Maintenance: Research and Practice. 8 (4): 269–280. doi:10.1002/(SICI)1096-908X(199607)8:4<269::AID-SMR133>3.0.CO;2-V.
