= Broadcom Crystal HD =

Hardware SIP core that performs video decoding

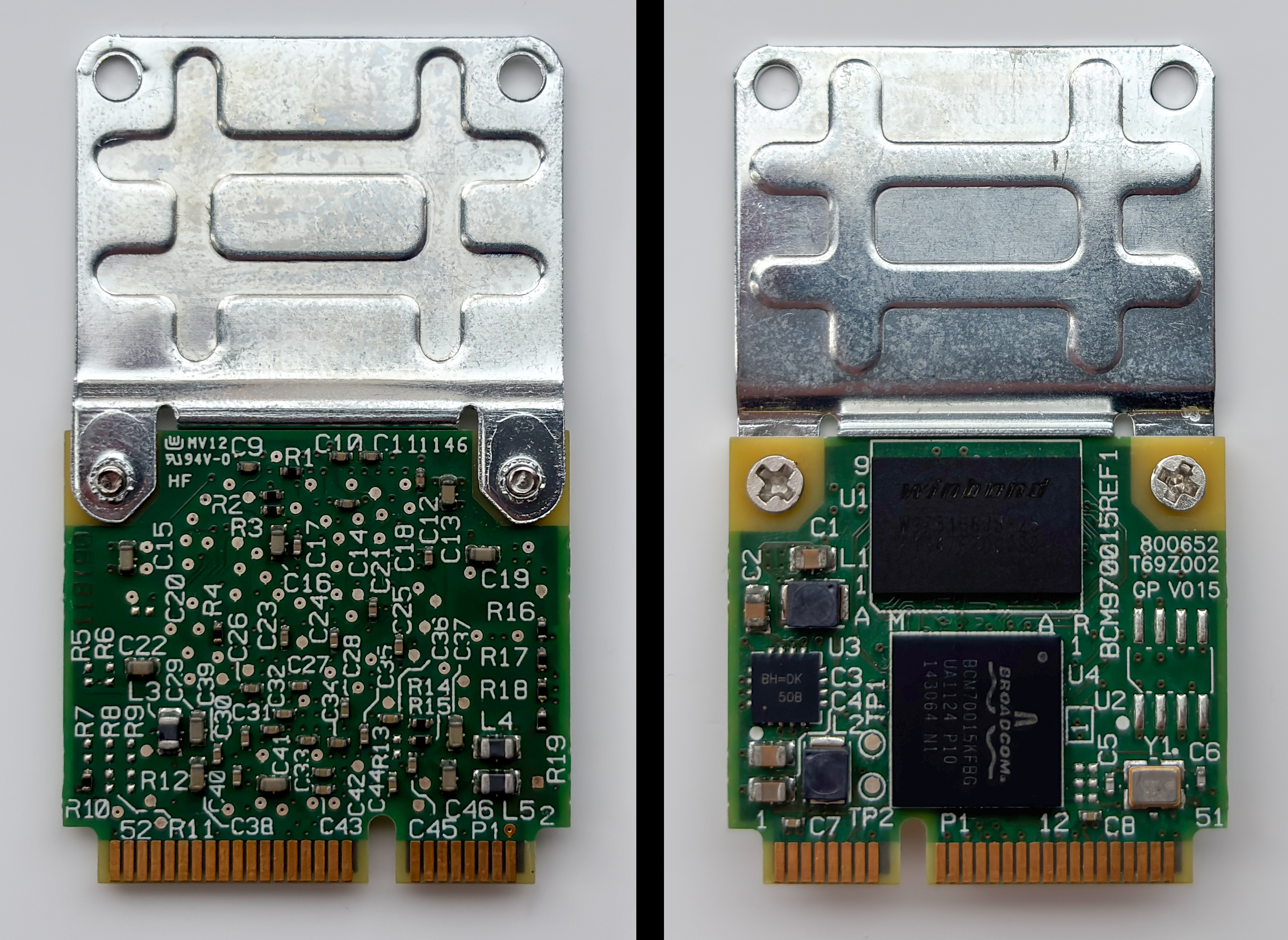
BCM70015 Mini PCIe card

Crystal HD is Broadcom's hardware semiconductor intellectual property (SIP) core that performs video decoding.

== Features ==
Two single chip media processors were released under the Crystal HD brand name: BCM970012 (codenamed Link) and BCM970015 (codenamed Flea). Both were available as mini PCIe cards.

The BCM970012 supports hardware decoding of H.264/MPEG-4 AVC, VC-1, WMV9 and MPEG-2 at resolutions up to 1080p and the BCM970015 additionally supports DivX 3.11, 4.1, 5.X, 6.X and Xvid. The Crystal HD chips do not support codecs such as VP8, VP9, Daala and HEVC, which were released after the hardware. AnandTech reviewed the BCM970012 in December 2009, comparing its video decoding capabilities against the NVIDIA ION, while the BCM970015 was reviewed in mid-2010.

The Crystal HD chips were typically found in computers with Intel Atom CPUs (such as the Dell Inspiron Mini 10 HP Slate 500 or ExoPC, ASUS Eee Keyboard), which lacked sufficiently fast CPUs to decode high-definition video purely in software.

Per the source code of libavcodec, the Crystal HD chips have a very simple interface: software programs using them "feed demuxed packets in one end and get decoded picture (fields/frames) out the other." However, additional buffering is required due to variable delays between the input of the raw packets and the output of the decoded pictures, caused both by b-frames in the video as well as quirks or bugs in the Crystal HD hardware.

=== Obsolescence ===
Until 2010, hardware video decoding capabilities had only been widely available in discrete GPUs, and many CPUs were not sufficiently fast to decode state-of-the-art high-definition video purely in software.

The need for dedicated video decoding accelerator hardware like Crystal HD in x86-based computers was greatly diminished with the 2010 launch of the Intel Core i-series, which featured an integrated GPU with Intel Clear Video hardware for video decoding. In subsequent generations of Intel processors, video decoding hardware has been rebranded as Intel Quick Sync Video. AMD followed suit by incorporating Unified Video Decoder hardware into its integrated GPUs.

== Operating system support ==
The Crystal HD SIP core must be supported by a device driver, which provides the video interfaces. One of these interfaces is then used by end-user software, for example Media Player Classic or GStreamer, to access CrystalHD.

=== Linux ===
Broadcom published a Linux device driver under GNU General Public License (GPL) version 2. Broadcom also published application and library source code on a royalty-free basis under the GNU Lesser General Public License (LGPL), version 2.1

Crystal HD can be accessed through the Video Acceleration API interface via an experimental driver (however, it cannot be recovered from the linked archive). A GStreamer plugin is available.

Crystal HD support is available in FFmpeg and MPlayer when compiled with the corresponding option.

It could be added to first generation Apple TV when OSMC is installed, although support was dropped in 2017.

=== Microsoft Windows ===
Broadcom published a device driver for Microsoft Windows that provides accelerated DirectShow renderers filters.

== See also ==
- Nvidia PureVideo
- AMD Unified Video Decoder
- Intel Quick Sync Video
- Amlogic Video Engine

=== Related Broadcom technologies ===
- Xilleon
- VideoCore
