= Jeff Black (businessman) =

American businessman (born 1961)

- Born: 1961 (age 64–65)
- Occupations: CEO, CSO, programmer, inventor

Jeffery D. "Jeff" Black is an American chief executive officer and chief strategy officer associated with the information technology industry. He also is a programmer and inventor, holding six patents.

== Biography ==
Black studied business and computer science and artificial intelligence programming. In 1984 he went on to work at Digital Equipment Corporation, where he was a company leader for fourteen years. During that time, he was part of the team that developed AltaVista Black served as general manager at AltaVista. During his time at Digital, he filed several patents, with at least three in 1995 alone: a "Method for search engine generating supplemented search", a "Dynamically categorizing entity information", and a "Dynamically categorizing entity information", all assigned to AltaVista Company. He also received a "top secret" clearance due to classified work for several agencies of the United States Government.

In 1998, Black quit Digital and became CEO of Internet Marketing Inc. (IMI), the first web mapping service on the Internet. He also established the Laurel, Maryland-based iAtlas. IAtlas established the first database on businesses on the Internet, compiling information that could be purchased by third-party groups for 5000 U.S. dollars. It also established a search engine that enabled casual users to locate businesses in specific locations, the first search engine that was able to do that. Initially relying on a business incubator provided by Doug Humphrey, within a year it had secured three million dollars of venture capital. On August 3, 1999, iAtlas secured a partnership with Ameritech (then the largest telecommunications company in the Midwest), allowing Ameritech's yellow pages search engine to use the iAtlas Registry.

In the early 2000s, Black established and then sold Hotels.com and Resorts.com. He also held management positions for BizExpense, Inc., Conomae Corporation, and Tandy Corporation.

In 2005, Black founded the startup company TalkPlus, based in San Mateo, California. TalkPlus served as a mobile phone service that allowed multiple phone lines to be used from a single mobile phone. TalkPlus also sold a related service called Mirror Numbers which allowed a user make calls from an existing landline phone number. The service allowed for new phone lines to be created for as little as one-tenth the cost of creating a new landline. Applications were also seen for use in conjunction with online dating services and online auction sites, to prevent callers related to those services from gaining access to permanent personal or business phone numbers. Black was inspired to develop the concept by the work he did for the government during his time at Digital. In 2007, Black stepped down from his position of CEO, in order to assume the mantle of chief strategy officer, allowing him to work on continuing to develop new technology innovations and corporate strategies. He was replaced as CEO by Michael Toepel.

Prior to its acquisition, Black was part of the staff of Trusted Opinion, a social networking website. He also serves on the board of directors of the Silicon Valley Cancer Foundation, a non-profit providing research into the causes and cures of cancer and information on its treatment. Black has also participated in Silicon Valley Open Doors technology conference, representing TalkPlus.
