= Anna Patterson =

Software engineer

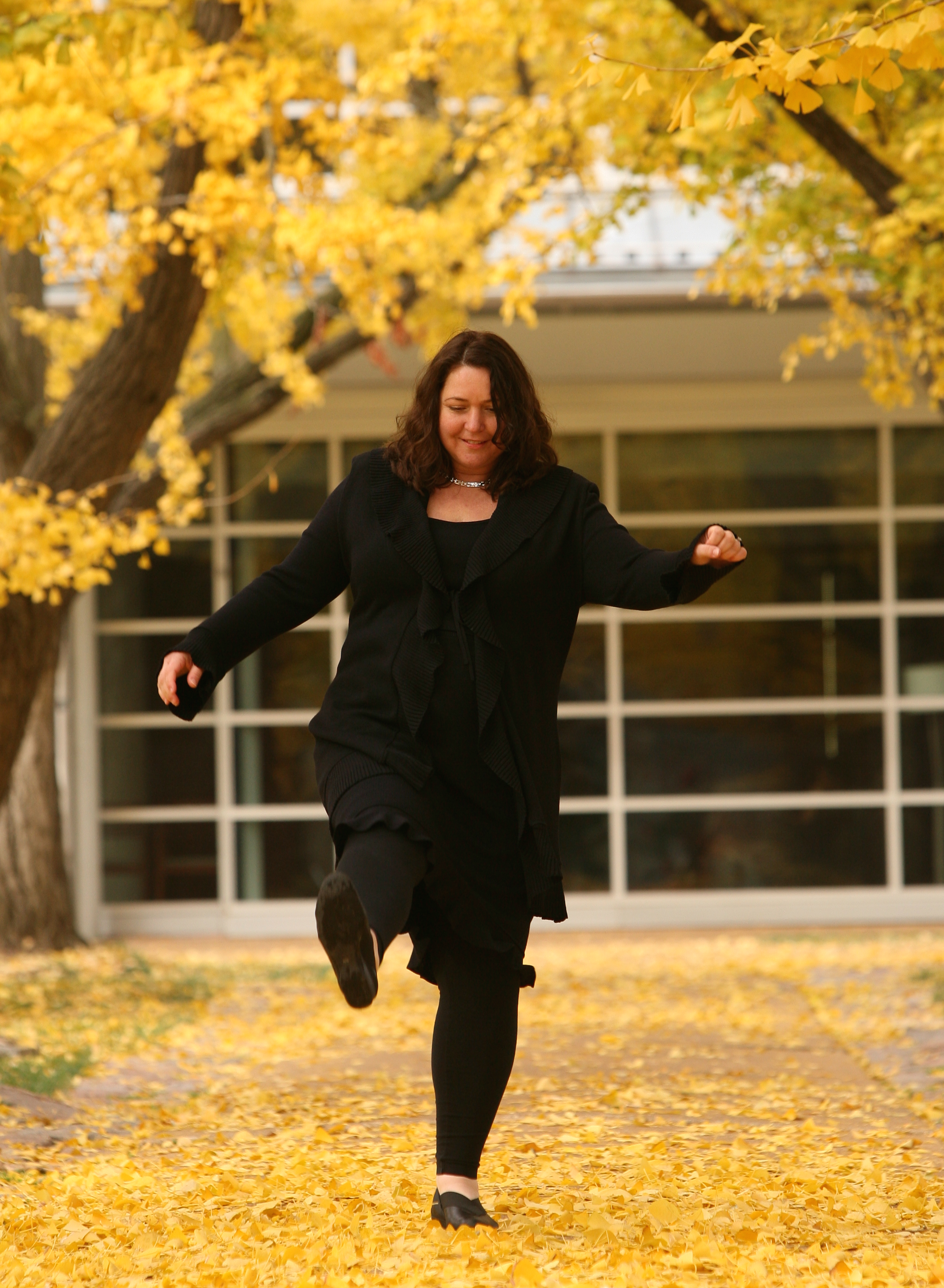
Anna Patterson in front of Olin Library at her alma mater Washington University in St. Louis.

Anna Patterson is a software engineer and a contributor to search engines.

== Education ==
Patterson received her B.S. in Computer Science and another in Electrical Engineering from McKelvey School of Engineering at Washington University in St. Louis and her Ph.D. from the University of Illinois at Urbana–Champaign and was a Research Scientist at Stanford University in artificial intelligence working with John McCarthy on Phenomenal Data Mining and Carolyn Talcott on theorem provers.

== Career ==
As of 2017 she was Founder and Managing Partner at Gradient Ventures and Vice President of Engineering at Google. While she was working in Google's Android organization, Patterson was responsible for a division of Google Play including Books and Search, Recommendations and Infrastructure for scaling up Android from 40 million phones to over 800 million phones.

She co-founded Cuil, a search engine (which she created after leaving Google in 2007) and wrote Recall.archive.org (part of the Wayback Machine), a history-based search engine out of the Internet Archive, which showed trends over time.

== Awards and honors ==
Patterson was a winner of the 2016 ABIE Award. She also served on the board of Square Inc. She was previously a trustee at Harvey Mudd College and a trustee at the Mathematical Sciences Research Institute and on the National Engineering Council at Washington University in St. Louis.
