= Gian Fulgoni =

British businessman, entrepreneur and market research consultant (born 1948)

Gian M. Fulgoni
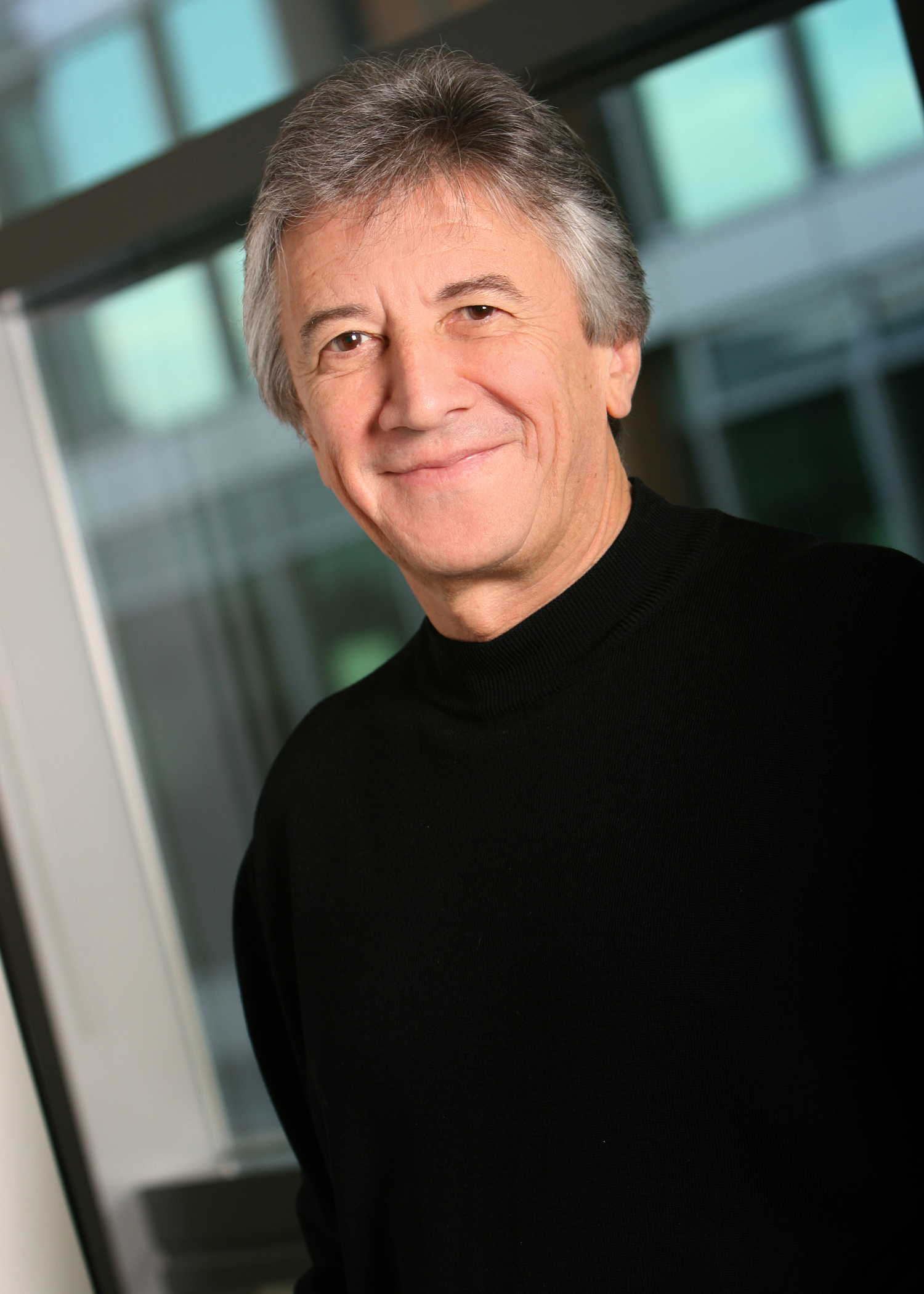
- Born: 24 January 1948 (age 78); Pontypool, United Kingdom
- Education: Lancaster University
- Occupations: CEO and co-founder, Comscore

Gian Mark Fulgoni (Crickhowell, 24 January 1948) is a British businessman, entrepreneur and market research consultant.

He specializes in measuring consumer behavior and the effectiveness of advertising across TV, print, and online. He has held executive roles, helped lead the IPOs of Information Resources, Inc. and Comscore, Inc., and served on boards across various industries, including software, consumer electronics, pet products, marketing services, and market research.

== Early life and education ==
Fulgoni was born and raised in Pontypool, South Wales, the son of Italian parents from Bardi, a town in Emilia-Romagna. He attended the University of Manchester, graduating with an honors degree in physics in 1969, followed by an M.A. in marketing in 1970 from Lancaster University Management School, at the time the only such program in the UK. In 2016, he was awarded an honorary Doctor of Science degree from Lancaster University in recognition of his outstanding contributions to the field of market research.

== Career ==
=== Early career ===
In 1970 after graduating from Lancaster University, Fulgoni moved from the UK to join Management Science Associates, Inc. in Pittsburgh, Pennsylvania, before moving a few years later to Chicago to head client services.

=== Information Resources, Inc. ===
From 1981 to 1998, he served as president, CEO, and Chairman of Information Resources, Inc. (IRI), a provider of UPC scanner data to the CPG industry. Under his leadership, IRI's revenues grew at 40% annually, reaching over $500 million, with a market value of $1.5 billion. In 1996, Advertising Age recognized IRI as the largest U.S. market research firm.

=== Technology and board roles ===
He was a board member of Platinum Technology, Inc. (1991–1999), during which it grew from $80 million to over $1 billion in revenue before being acquired by Computer Associates for $4 billion in 1999. He also served on the board of USRobotics, acquired by 3Com for $8 billion in 1997, and yesMail.com, acquired by CMGI for $700 million in 2000.

=== comScore, Inc. ===
In 1999, Fulgoni co-founded Comscore, an Internet market intelligence firm. He served as Executive Chairman until 2014 and as CEO beginning in 2016. The board appointed him CEO in August 2016, and he oversaw restructuring and leadership transitions until 2018, when he retired. Comscore operates internationally and serves multiple industries. Fulgoni co-holds a U.S. patent for Comscore's data collection technology. The company was named a "Technology Pioneer" by the World Economic Forum in 2007 and a Global Growth Company Shaper in 2010.

=== Later business roles ===
In 2002, Fulgoni joined the board of PetMed Express, Inc., where he served until his retirement in 2025. He served, periodically, as chairman and as a member of the company's governance committees during a period of expansion of the company's e-commerce operations. Beginning in 2018, he joined 4490 Ventures, a venture capital fund, as a Venture Partner.

== Publications and speaking ==
Fulgoni has authored articles in the Journal of Advertising Research, Admap, and ESOMAR publications. He also wrote regular columns (“Numbers, Please”) for the Journal of Advertising Research, analyzing the effectiveness of online advertising, consumer shopping behavior, and shifts in media consumption.

He is a frequent speaker at marketing industry conferences, discussing Internet industry trends, consumer analytics, and the impact of technology on advertising. His speaking engagements have included the Advertising Research Foundation’s annual conference, ESOMAR global congresses, and digital media summit, where he presented research on cross-platform advertising effectiveness.

== Industry recognition ==
In 1991 and again in 2004, Fulgoni was named Illinois Entrepreneur of the Year, the only person to have twice received the award. In 1992, he received the Wall Street Transcript Award for outstanding contributions as CEO in enhancing the overall value of IRI to the benefit of its shareholders. In 2008, Fulgoni was inducted into the Chicago Entrepreneurship Hall of Fame. Also in 2008, Fulgoni was named Ernst & Young Entrepreneur of the Year. He was awarded the Honorary Fellowship by the University of Glamorgan in Wales in 2012, which recognizes the efforts and achievements of individuals who have served a discipline area with particular distinction, in this case Fulgoni's career in the field of market research. In 2009 the Advertising Research Foundation awarded him its "Great Mind Award". and in 2014 the Advertising Research Foundation awarded him its Lifetime Achievement Award. In 2016 he was awarded a Doctor of Science by Lancaster University. In 2018 he was awarded the "Erwin Ephron De-Mystification Award" by the Advertising Research Foundation. In 2019, he was inducted into the Market Research Hall of Fame.

== Personal life ==
Fulgoni has lived in the United States since the 1970s, primarily in the Pittsburgh, Chicago and Florida areas. In 2018, his Chicago Gold Coast mansion, which had been used as a location for magazine fashion shoots, including for Playboy, was listed for $4.9 million.
