= AltaVista =

Web search engine (1995–2013)

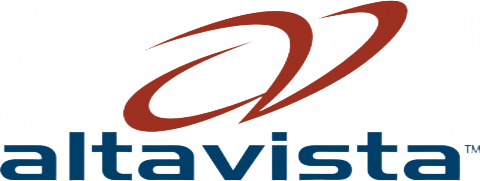

- Top: 2002–2013 AltaVista logo Bottom: The AltaVista web portal in 1999
- Website type: Search engine
- Available in: Multilingual
- Founded: December 15, 1995; 30 years ago
- Headquarters: Palo Alto, California, U.S.
- Key people: Ilene H. Lang; Paul Flaherty; Louis Monier; Michael Burrows; Jeff Black
- Parent: Digital Equipment Corporation (1995–1998); Compaq (1998–2003); Overture Services (2003); Yahoo (2003–2013)
- Website: altavista.com at the Wayback Machine (archived 2012-02-25)
- Advertising: Yes
- Registration: No
- Launched: December 15, 1995; 30 years ago
- Current status: Defunct (July 8, 2013)

The AltaVista home page in 1996, showing the simple search interface

AltaVista (a contraction of alta + vista, meaning "high view" in the Spanish language), based in Palo Alto, California, was a pioneering web search engine. Launched in December 1995, it was the first "full text"/boolean searchable index of the World Wide Web.

Web traffic increased steadily from 300,000 hits on the first day to more than 80 million hits per day by 1997, making it one of the most popular websites at the time. However, traffic plummeted shortly thereafter due to competition from Google Search and others. The site was acquired by Yahoo in 2003. In June 2013, the domain name was redirected to Yahoo Search.

AltaVista is credited with implementing the first CAPTCHA to prevent fraudulent account registrations and internet bots from automatically adding pages to the AltaVista web index.

== History ==
AltaVista was created by researchers at Digital Equipment Corporation (DEC) who were trying to showcase the company's hardware to make it easier to find files on the company's public network.

Paul Flaherty came up with the idea, along with Louis Monier, who programmed the web crawler, and Michael Burrows who wrote the indexer.

The name "AltaVista" reflects the surroundings of their offices in Palo Alto, California.

AltaVista publicly launched on December 15, 1995.

Ilene H. Lang was the first CEO of AltaVista; she was recruited by DEC to build its software business.

At launch, AltaVista had two innovations that put it ahead of other search engines: It used a fast, multi-threaded web crawler, Scooter, that could cover many more World Wide Web pages than were believed to exist at the time, and it had an efficient backend database, TurboVista, running on advanced hardware.

In 1996, AltaVista became the exclusive provider of search results for Yahoo.

In 1997, it launched Babel Fish, a web-based machine translation application that translated text or webpages.

In January 1998, Compaq acquired DEC for $9.6 billion, including $4.8 billion in cash and the remainder in stock, to acquire its server technology. As part of the transaction, Compaq acquired AltaVista.

In February 1998, AltaVista added free webmail.

In May 1998, it ended its deal with Yahoo to provide search results.

In August 1998, Compaq acquired the altavista.com domain name for $3.3 million and redirected the site; it had previously used altavista.digital.com.

Until January 1999, AltaVista featured only a search engine on a "utilitarian" web page with simple yellow and orange graphics. In January 1999, Compaq spun-off AltaVista and began a redesign of the site as a web portal to compete with Yahoo. Rod Schrock was named CEO.

In February 1999, Compaq acquired Zip2 to enhance AltaVista.

In June 1999, Compaq sold 83% of AltaVista to CMGI for $2.1 billion in stock and $220 million in cash.

In July 1999, AltaVista began offering financial content.

In August 1999, AltaVista began offering free dial-up Internet access. It ended the offering in December 2000.

In October 1999, the site, as well as its price comparison site Shopping.com, was relaunched. It then offered real-time traffic pictures, news, financial information, and entertainment. It also increased staff from 80 to over 600 and launched a new tagline: "AltaVista: smart is beautiful". It aired television advertisements, including one with Pamela Anderson, as part of a $120 million marketing campaign.

In November 1999, AltaVista acquired RagingBull.com.

In December 1999, AltaVista filed for a $300 million initial public offering; it was cancelled due to the end of the dot-com bubble.

In 2000, according to Media Metrix, AltaVista was used by 17.7% of Internet users while Google Search was used by only 7% of Internet users.

In October 2000, Rod Schrock resigned as CEO.

In February 2002, AltaVista shut its webmail service; at the time, it had 200,000 users. The accounts were transferred to Mail.com.

In November 2002, the website was redesigned again to include a pared-down front page and more frequent updates of indexed links.

In February 2003, Overture Services acquired AltaVista for $140 million.

In July 2003, Yahoo acquired Overture for $1.63 billion.

In June 2013, the domain name was redirected to Yahoo Search.

== See also ==
- List of search engines
