= Cuil =

Defunct search engine

- The Cuil homepage
- Website type: Search engine
- Available in: Multilingual
- Owners: Cuil, Inc.
- Website: www.cuil.com (archived through Internet Archive)
- Launched: July 28, 2008
- Current status: Down (September 17, 2010)

Cuil (/ˈkuːl/ KOOL) was a search engine that organized web pages by content and displayed relatively long entries along with thumbnail pictures for many results. Cuil said it had a larger index than any other search engine, with about 120 billion web pages. It went live on July 28, 2008. Cuil's servers were shut down on September 17, 2010, with later confirmations the service had ended.

Cuil was managed and developed largely by former employees of Google, Anna Patterson and Russell Power. The CEO, co-founder, and Patterson's husband, Tom Costello, had worked for IBM and others. Cuil's privacy policy, unlike that of other search engines, said it did not store users' search activity or IP addresses.

== Name ==
The Irish ancestry of Anna Patterson's husband Tom Costello sparked the name Cuil, which the company states is taken from a series of Celtic folklore stories involving a character, Fionn mac Cumhaill, they erroneously refer to as Finn MacCuil. The company says that Cuil is Irish for "knowledge" and "hazel".

Some linguists are unsure of this derivation and pronunciation, and note that the modern Irish word for "hazel" is spelled coll (coill or cuill in genitive form, the former spelling having superseded the latter as a result of the Caighdeán Oifigiúil reforms of the mid-twentieth century). Foras na Gaeilge, the official governing body of the Irish language, did not support the assertion that cuil means "knowledge". "I am unaware myself of the meaning 'knowledge' being with the word 'cuil' in Irish", Stiofán Ó Deoráin, an official on Foras na Gaeilge's terminology committee, said. Even pre-Caighdeán dictionaries such as Dineen do not associate the cuil spelling with knowledge or hazel. Dinneen only lists two nouns and one adjective with the spelling cuil: "f., a fly, a horse-fly...", "f., a venomous aspect; great eagerness..." and "gs. of col, as a., wicked."

The company name had previously been spelled Cuill.

== History ==
Cuil launched in July 2008 with an index of 121,617,892,992 web pages. About one month after launch, Cuil's product VP and search technologist, Louis Monier, quit the company citing disagreements with the CEO, Tom Costello. On December 19, 2008, BusinessWeek listed Cuil as one of the most successful U.S. startups of 2008, based on the amount of money they raised. As of February 2009, Cuil had 127 billion indexed pages. According to Alexa, the site reached a peak of just over 0.2% of worldwide internet users in late July 2008 and by September 12, 2008, it had dropped to 0.02% and ranked as the 5,340th site by traffic. By October 13, 2008, it had dropped to 0.005% and ranked as the 21,960th site in traffic.

=== Shutdown ===
PC Magazine reported that on the morning of September 17, 2010 "employees were told about Cuil's demise ... and the servers were taken offline five hours later." Laid-off employees were told they would not be paid. The shutdown reportedly came after an acquisition agreement fell through earlier in the week. Their patents were sold to Google and Anna Patterson returned to Google to work for its Search Engine department.

== Features ==
A user could log into their Facebook account via Cuil, which would then search friend updates for topics, with search links. A user could also send messages to their friends through Cuil.

Cuil worked on an automated encyclopedia called Cpedia, built by algorithmically summarizing and clustering ideas on the web to create encyclopedia-like reports. Instead of displaying search results, Cuil would show Cpedia articles matching the searched terms. This was meant to reduce duplication by combining information into one document.

Cuil was available in 8 languages: English, French, German, Italian, Polish, Portuguese, Spanish and Turkish, with more planned for the future.

== Criticism ==
Cuil received widely critical press coverage. Concerns were expressed about the website's slow response times, irrelevant or wrong search results and in at least one case, irrelevant pornographic images displayed alongside search results. Danny Sullivan of Search Engine Watch questioned the validity of Cuil's claim that it had the world's largest search engine index and criticized it for focusing on size rather than relevance. However, despite reported problems with search results, Net Applications reported that for the last three days of July 2008, Cuil beat Google and Yahoo in the amount of time spent on a site after referral from a search engine.

According to an interview with a Cuil representative, while other Web 2.0 launches using massively parallel processing might fail with a slow down or crash, Cuil's architecture was responding with incomplete, "less-than-relevant results that then appear at the top of users' pages." Cuil's VP of communications Vince Sollitto said the search engine was experiencing heavy first-day overloads and they were "busy putting out fires." Sollitto said Cuil "will only improve with time. It's day one. Traffic is massive. We're new. There are bugs to fix, results to improve."

After the initial critical press coverage, Cuil was alleged to have caused issues for some websites, owing to how the Cuil indexing robot polled certain sites (including under its pre-release name, Cuill). Many website owners reported that the Twiceler crawler repeatedly hit their site with randomly generated URLs in an attempt to find pages inaccessible by links. Others reported irrelevant images associated with their listing in Cuil's search results.

== See also ==
- List of search engines
