= Rentrak =

American measurement company

Rentrak Corporation
- Industry: Media measurement
- Founded: 1977; 49 years ago, in Portland, Oregon, U.S.
- Headquarters: Portland, Oregon, U.S.
- Products: Audience measurement
- Revenue: US$102.9 million (FY 2015)
- Number of employees: 419 full-time; 113 part-time (FY 2015)
- Website: rentrak.com

Rentrak Corporation is a global media measurement and research company serving the entertainment industry. Rentrak is headquartered in Portland, Oregon, US, with additional offices in the United States and around the world.

In February 2016, Comscore acquired Rentrak in an all-stock deal valued at $768 million and renamed the company Comscore Movies.. The company returned to its original name in 2026, with the company being acquired by a private equity fund.

== Company information ==
Rentrak has developed metrics to be used as database currencies for the evaluation and selling of entertainment content across many platforms including box office, multi-screen television, and home video. The company tracks viewing behavior from more than 35 million televisions across all 210 markets. It is the only company in the industry to provide video on demand measurement, obtained from set-top box data, and is also the sole provider of real-time box office ticket sales intelligence worldwide. Rentrak publishes weekly entertainment charts ranking the top ten in box office, video on demand, DVD sales and rentals, video game sales and TV engagement.

== History ==
Rentrak began as a nationwide video chain named National Video, which was founded and incorporated in 1977. National Video founder Ron Berger developed what is now known as the pay-per-transaction (PPT) system, which allows studios and retailers to lease movie titles instead of purchasing them. The company went public in 1986.

In 1988, facing competition from rival Blockbuster Video, Berger sold the National Video franchise chain and renamed the company Rentrak. Ron Berger later resigned as CEO of Rentrak in 2000. Paul Rosenbaum was CEO from Sept. 2000 to June 2009, when Bill Livek was appointed CEO. Bill Livek extended his contract, along with the company's COO/CFO, David Chemerow, to mid-2015 in November 2011.

In December 2009, Rentrak acquired Nielsen EDI, a leader in box office measurement, for $15 million. The deal made Rentrak the sole provider of worldwide box office ticket sales information for studios and industry analysts.

By July 2015, more than 440 local stations from across 68 station groups used Rentrak's StationView Essentials product for daily media measurement.

Mark Cuban, Internet billionaire, owner of the NBA's Dallas Mavericks and the HDNet networks, purchased 120,000 more Rentrak shares on August 22, 2011, and holds an 8.7 percent ownership stake in the company as of September 22, 2011. He had been accumulating Rentrak stock since 2004. He sold his interest in the company in May 2015.

== Financial information ==
Total company revenue increased 32 percent to $28.5 million for the fourth quarter of fiscal 2015, up from $21.6 million for the same period last year. The company's TV Everywhere product line grew 64%, its Movies Everywhere product line improved 10% on a constant currency basis, and its OnDemand Everywhere product line grew 21%.

Total company revenue for fiscal 2015 grew to $102.9 million, up 36% from $75.6 million for the previous year. The company's TV Everywhere™ product line grew 76%, its Movies Everywhere™ product line improved 13% on a constant currency basis, and its OnDemand Everywhere® product line grew 11%.

== See also ==
- List of companies based in Oregon
