= Louis Monier =

American computer scientist

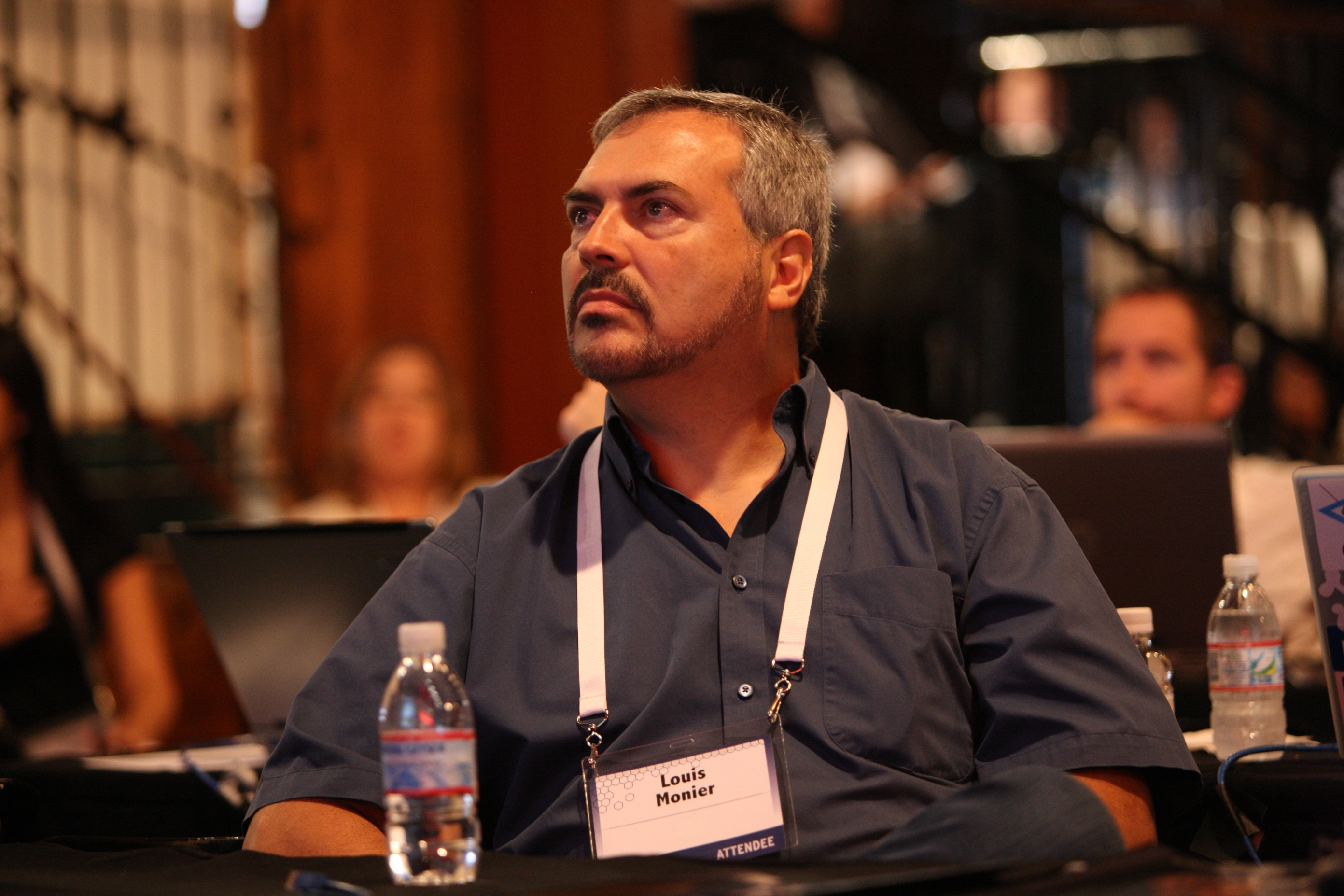
- Monier in 2008, photograph by Steve Maller
- Born: 1956 (age 69–70)
- Citizenship: France
- Education: University of Paris XI (PhD)
- Scientific career
- Fields: Computer Science
- Workplaces: Google; Ebay; Digital Equipment Corporation; AltaVista

Louis Monier (born March 21, 1956) is a cofounder of the defunct Internet search engine AltaVista together with Paul Flaherty and Michael Burrows. After he left AltaVista, he worked at eBay and then at Google. He left Google in August 2007 to join Cuil, a search engine startup. He was Vice President of Products at Cuil. One month after the launch, he left Cuil, citing differences with the CEO. He also was the co-founder and CTO of Qwiki with Doug Imbruce. Qwiki won the TechCrunch Disrupt Award in 2010 and was sold to Yahoo in 2013. In 2014, Yahoo shuttered Qwiki.

Monier received a Ph.D. in Mathematics and Computer Science from the University of Paris XI, France in 1980 and worked at Carnegie Mellon University, Xerox PARC, and DEC's Western Research Laboratory.

Louis was the Chief Scientist of Proximic until July 2013, and has founded a health technology company, Kyron.
