= Circana =

American technology company

Circana, Inc.
- Formerly: National Purchase Diary Panel Inc. (1966–1975); NPD Research Inc. (1975–1988)
- Type: Private
- Industry: Market research
- Founded: September 28, 1966; 60 years ago (as National Purchase Diary Panel Inc.)
- Headquarters: Chicago, Illinois, U.S.
- Area served: Worldwide
- Key people: Stuart Aitken (CEO)
- Products: Market intelligence; Business analytics
- Owner: Hellman & Friedman
- Website: circana.com

Circana, Inc., formerly known as Information Resources, Inc. and the NPD Group (previously National Purchase Diary Panel Inc. and NPD Research Inc.), is an American market research and technology company headquartered in Chicago.

The current name, Circana, was adopted in 2023 after the company's merger with IRI.

IRI was founded in 1979 to track principally consumers’ behavior and connect it to products those consumers bought at the supermarket.

NPD helps retailers, manufacturers, financial analysts, and the public sector measure performance, predict future performance, improve marketing and product development, and identify business and consumer trends and market opportunities. NPD tracks spending and has dedicated advisers and analysts in more than 20 industries.

Today, Circana helps clients across 26 industries with point-of-sale data tracking, panel data analysis, marketing mix modeling and assortment optimization. In terms of technology, Circana leverages a proprietary technology platform called "Liquid Data™" and its underlying data set and algorithms .

Circana is majority owned by private equity. After the 2022 NPD merger, Circana became jointly owned by Hellman & Friedman, Vestar, New Mountain Capital and company management.

Circana announced that Stuart Aitken, formerly Chief Merchant and Marketing Officer at Kroger and previously CEO of dunnhumby would become President and CEO effective January 1, 2025.

== M&A activities ==
In August 2024, Circana acquired NCSolutions, a joint venture focused on advertising effectiveness measurement, along with Nielsen's Marketing Mix Modeling business.

== NPD Group legacy history ==
In July 1999, the NPD Group and GfK co-purchased the entirety of market research firm Intelect ASW, a company focused according to The New York Times on "the consumer electronics, information technology and appliance industries." In early 2001, the NPD Group purchased PC Data's core business and merged its operations into NPD Intelect; 60 members of the PC Data staff migrated to the company. Intelect subsequently formed a subdivision dedicated to the console game market, NPDFunworld, in October 2001. NPDTechworld, a branch dedicated to the technology and software sector, followed in December. NPD uses sales data, such as checkout tracking from retailers and distributors as well as consumer-reported purchasing behavior, and offers consumer panel and retail sales tracking services, special reports, analytic solutions, and advisory services.

NPD began tracking the North American video game industry from 1995. In the 1990s, NPD's Toy Retail Survey Tracking (TRST) system was the video game industry's standard source for video game sales figures. The TRST collected these figures from 17 North American retail chains, or 63% of the American market. Those who purchased TRST's data, which NPD repackaged without extrapolation, were discouraged from republishing the raw figures.

NPD also provides a service called VIP Voice that allows consumers to complete surveys about the products and services that they use.

In October 2021, NPD entered intro an agreement to be acquired by private equity firm Hellman & Friedman.

NPD serves industries in the United States, Australia, Belgium, Brazil, Canada, China, France, Germany, Italy, Japan, Mexico, the Netherlands, New Zealand, Russia, South Korea, Spain, Sweden, Turkey, the United Kingdom.

BookScan, Pubtrack Digital, PubTrack Higher Education, PubTrack Christian, Books & Consumers, PubEasy and PubNet belong to NPD since January 2017. NPD acquired these services from Nielsen's U.S. market information and research services for the book industry. In the U.S. these services are now part of NPD Book, a new U.S. practice area. NIQ (formed from divestiture of consumer intelligence business of Nielsen Holdings in 2021) still operate their book services outside of the U.S., including BookScan in the UK, Ireland, Australia, New Zealand, India, South Africa, Italy, Spain, Brazil and Mexico.
