= AMA Gold Report Top 50 =

Top 50 marketing research firms in the US

The AMA Gold Report Top 50, formerly known as the Honomichl Top 50, is an annual compilation of the top 50 revenue-generating marketing research firms operating in the United States. The report is published by the American Marketing Association magazine, Marketing News. The list was compiled by Jack Honomichl until his death in 2013 and was renamed to AMA Gold Report Top 50 after his death.

The Honomichl was a rating system developed by Jack Honomichl that "is" the Fortune 500 list of market research firms.

Competitors include the Global Top 50 Research Organizations compiled by research press company RFL Communications, Inc.
