= ExoPC =

Windows tablet computer

ExoPC Slate
- Developer: EXOPC
- Manufacturer: Pegatron
- Type: Tablet
- Released: October 2010
- Media: SD/SDHC card-reader (32 GB max)
- Operating system: Microsoft Windows 7 Home Premium, 32-bit Edition
- CPU: Intel Atom Pineview-M N450, 1.66 GHz – 64-bit support
- Memory: 2 GB DDR2 SDRAM
- Storage: 32 GB or 64 GB SSD hard drive
- Display: 11.6-inch (diagonal), 1366 × 768 resolution, 16:9 ratio, 135 pixels per inch
- Graphics: Intel GMA 3150 and Broadcom Crystal HD
- Sound: Built-in 2 × 1.5 W speakers, microphone
- Input: Multi-touch capacitive dual-touch, pressure-sensitive
- Camera: 1.3 megapixel
- Connectivity: Bluetooth 2.1 and EDR; Wireless Wifi 802.11 b/g/n
- Power: 4-hour battery
- Online services: App store
- Dimensions: 11.6 × 7.7 × 0.55 inches (295 × 195 × 14.0 mm)
- Weight: 2.09 pounds (950 g)

The EXOPC is a Tablet PC, in slate form, that uses Windows 7 Home Premium as its operating system, and is designed by the company of the same name, now defunct, based in Quebec, Canada. The EXOPC Slate is manufactured by Pegatron. The first EXOPC slate was launched in October 2010 directly from EXOPC Corp. on their website, and in Canada through the company Hypertechnologie Ciara. Hypertechnologie Ciara markets the slate under the name Ciara Vibe.

Probitas markets the EXOPC as Mobi-One in Southern Europe and North Africa. RM Education markets the EXOPC in the UK as the RM Slate. Leader Computers markets the EXOPC in Australia. The EXOPC Slate is also currently available in the United States via the Microsoft Store, both online and in stores. Mustek markets it as the Mecer Lucid Slate in South Africa.

== Hardware ==
The architecture is based on an Intel Atom-M Pineview N450 CPU that is clocked at 1.66 GHz, and includes 2 GB of DDR2 SDRAM and 32 GB of solid-state drive (SSD) storage in its basic version, with an alternative model having a larger 64 GB SSD.

The EXOPC is also equipped with an accelerometer, which lets the display change from a portrait mode to a landscape mode by turning the slate in either direction. Internally it has four mini-PCIe slots of which three provide space for full-length cards and one half length. Three of these slots are in use and the fourth is available, but intended for a WWAN card. The unit also provides a SIM card slot.

== Display ==
The EXOPC has an 11.6-inch diagonal, capacitive multi-touch screen. The screen has a resolution of 1366 × 768 pixels (WXGA), a 16:9 ratio, and has 135 pixels per inch. The screen's firmware currently allows detection of two points of simultaneous touch, but is technically capable of up to 10 points of touch.

A light sensor built into the front of the tablet automatically adjusts the display brightness to ambient condition.

It is also possible to use a capacitive stylus for precision work, such as hand-drawn art and graphic works.

== Connectivity ==
The EXOPC offers connectivity equivalent to that of a standard laptop:

- Wi-Fi IEEE 802.11b/IEEE 802.11g / IEEE 802.11n
- Bluetooth 2.1 + EDR
- Two USB 2.0 ports
- Audio in/out SuperJack
- Mini-HDMI for connecting to an external monitor or television, with a maximum output resolution of 1080p (upscaled from 1366 × 768)
- Dock connector

== External power supply ==
Recharging the battery is done through a standard external power supply:

- Size: 85 by 33 by 25 millimetres (3.35 in × 1.30 in × 0.98 in)
- Weight: 950 grams (34 ounces)
- Input: 100–240 V
- Output: 19 V, 2.1 amperes

== Software features ==
=== Operating system ===
The EXOPC uses Microsoft Windows 7 as its operating system. The company has developed a GUI interface around the standard Windows 7 GUI, nicknamed by the EXOPC community as the Connect Four Interface due to its full screen of interactive circles arranged in a grid pattern. A dedicated button on the touch-screen interface will minimize the EXOPC layer and reveal the Windows 7 desktop, allowing the user to have the EXOPC Slate act as a standard Windows computer when needed.

=== Applications ===
==== Pre-installed applications ====
The EXOPC comes with the following pre-installed applications:

- Microsoft Security Essentials
- Microsoft .NET framework 4.0
- Microsoft Silverlight runtime for IE
- Adobe Flash Player 10.2 and Acrobat Reader for reading PDF files
- EXOPC GUI Layer

==== Store-specific applications ====
An application library, similar to the Apple App Store or the Android Market is available for the device, accessible through the EXOPC UI.

== Feedback ==
The tablet captured the attention of several blogs and websites in the summer of 2010, being heralded as a possible alternative to the iPad. However, early reviews criticized the weight and battery life of the final product, as well as many missing features, the interface itself, sluggishness of the web browser, and difficulties to use the on-screen keyboard.

== See also ==
- WeTab – German version with the MeeGo-OS, and similar hardware
