= HP Slate =

Small line of HP consumer tablets

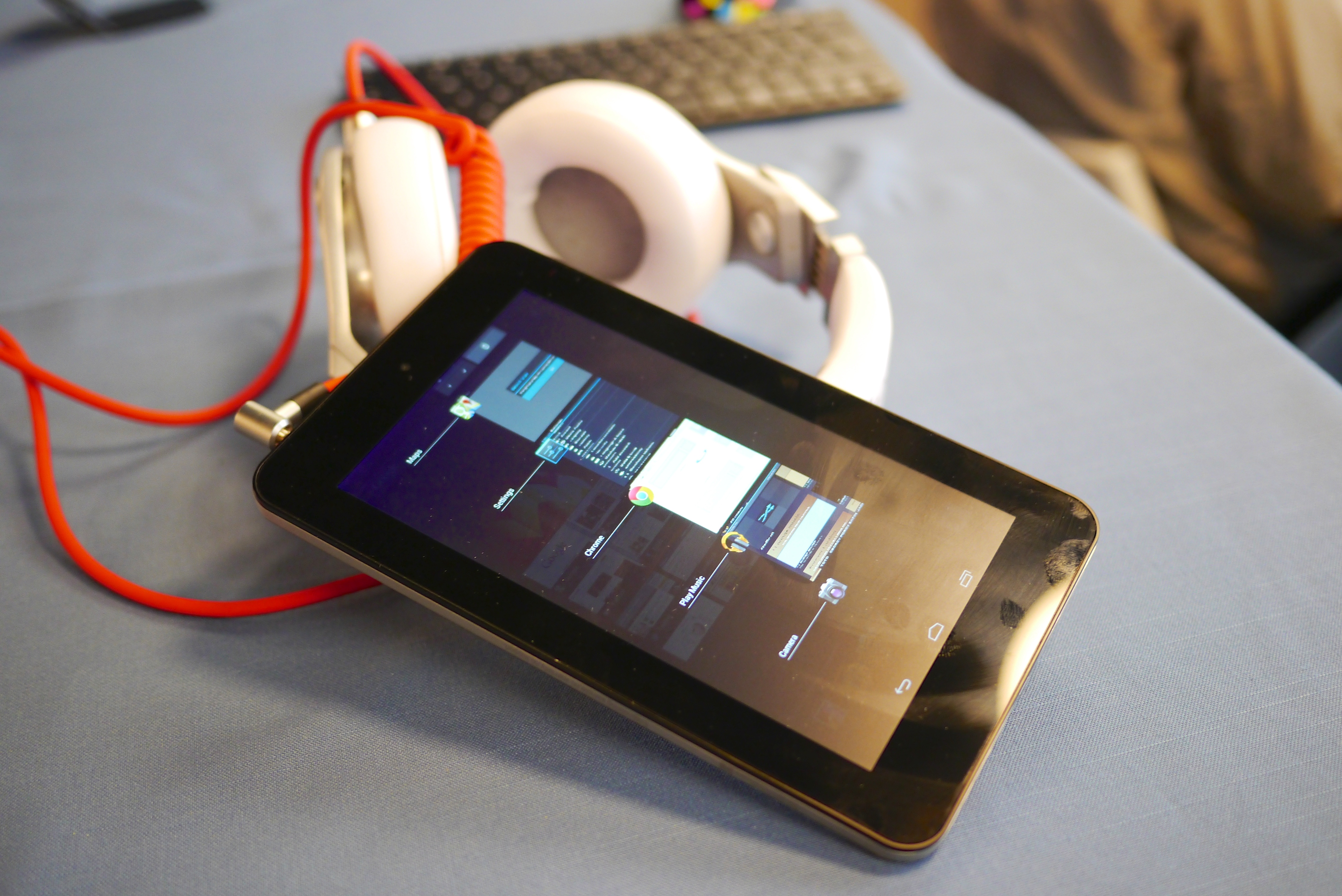
- Manufacturer: Hewlett-Packard
- Released: 22 October 2010
- Discontinued: 2015
- Website: www.hp.com/slate

HP Slate is a small line of HP consumer tablets and all-in-ones.

== Models ==
=== HP Slate 500 ===
The Slate 500 has a three-megapixel camera on its back panel and a VGA resolution webcam on the front panel. It is an 8.9" capacitive multi-touch screen supporting 1024×600 pixel resolution with digitizer and pen support. The Slate is powered by a 1.86 GHz Intel Atom Z540 processor with 2GB DDR2 of RAM, 64GB of onboard solid-state flash storage, and one standard USB 2.0 port. The device supports 1080p playback powered by the Intel GMA 500 integrated graphics chipset in addition to a Broadcom Crystal HD media accelerator card for hardware-assisted video playback. Wireless capabilities include the built-in WiFi and Bluetooth support. A 2-cell 30WHr lithium-polymer battery supplies power with an average runtime of 5 hours. The Slate 500 also supports a stylus pen/digitizer, enabling on-screen freehand drawing and writing.

The Slate 500 runs Windows 7, which includes native touch technology. Adobe Systems and HP confirmed that the "full web" experience would be available on the Slate 500, including full hardware-accelerated Adobe Flash content and Adobe AIR applications.

When upgraded to Windows 8, the display resolution will be precluded from using the tiled interface. However, with an intel driver, the resolution can be changed to 1024 x 768 which is the minimum value for the Modern interface. The Slate 500 (at the time known simply as the Slate) received a positive reception when shown at CES 2010. CNBC said, "HP's Slate has been the big buzz."

=== Slate 6 ===
HP Slate 6 is a 6" Android smartphone.

=== HP Slate 7 ===
HP Slate 7 is a 7-inch Android 4.1 tablet that was announced on February 24, 2013, and started shipping in April 2013. It has a stainless-steel frame, black front, and gray or red soft-touch back. A key feature of this small tablet is the microSDHC slot. It is HP's second Android device (the Photosmart eStation C510 printer contained an Android tablet that lacked Google Services). The Slate 7 runs mainly stock Android 4.1, with the exception of HP ePrint, an application that will allow a user to print wirelessly from most Android applications. Unlike in most electronic devices, the pixels used in the Slate 7 screen are not square, but rectangular; therefore the screen image is stretched in the tablet's long axis, making circles into ovals, squares into rectangles, and so on. Reviewers did not like that it was underpowered, had a sub-par display, and had poor battery life compared to the other tablets sold in the middle of 2013. The device was also well known for charging and battery problems.

=== Pro Slate 12 ===
HP Pro Slate 12 is a 12" ARM-based Android tablet with pen input option, 2015.

=== Slate 17 ===
HP Slate 17 is an Intel Celeron-based 17" Android tablet/all-in-one, 2014.

=== Slate 21 ===
HP Slate 21 is a computer developed by Hewlett-Packard that runs the Android operating system. It was announced on June 24, 2013, via HP's blog The Next Bench with a price of $399.00, and released in September that year. It is described as either an all-in-one desktop computer or a large tablet computer.

The device uses a 21.5-inch touchscreen and a Tegra 4 processor, but does not include a battery. It runs Android Jelly Bean as its operating system. It received mixed reviews from critics, with reviewers favoring the screen's wide viewing angles and Full HD resolution, while criticizing the lack of software optimization for the large display.

The Slate 21 uses an Nvidia Tegra 4 system-on-chip running at 1.66 GHz. It includes 1 GB of DDR3 memory and 8 GB of internal flash storage, which can be expanded via an SD card slot. Connectivity support includes three USB 2.0 ports, a 10/100Mbit/s Ethernet socket, a 3.5 mm headphone jack, Bluetooth 3.0, and dual-band 802.11 n Wi-Fi.

The Slate 21 uses a 21.5-inch IPS panel with a resolution of 1920×1080. The device includes a 2.1 megapixel front-facing camera capable of recording 720p video. It does not include an accelerometer, which meant that any Android games which use accelerometer controls cannot be played. The screen has a glossy surface. It is an optical touchscreen supporting two-point multi-touch via three cameras, unlike other tablets which use a capacitive touchscreen. The device uses a white plastic chassis, with an easel-like stand on the rear which allows adjusting the angle of its tilt between 15 and 70 degrees. The device can be fixed to a wall using a VESA mount if the hinge is unscrewed.

A USB keyboard and mouse is bundled with the device. The keyboard includes shortcut keys for access to Android menus such as the home screen and music controls, replacing the usual function keys and Start/Escape keys. It does not contain an internal battery, requiring users to turn off the device when moving it between power sockets.

==== HP Slate 21 Pro ====
HP Slate 21 Pro is a variant of the HP Slate 21 and was announced during CES 2014. It includes 16 GB of onboard storage and 2 GB of RAM, twice that of the Slate 21. Because it includes an HDMI input and an upstream USB port, it can be used as a touchscreen display when plugged into a conventional Windows computer. The device is preinstalled with Citrix Receiver.

Michael Brown of PCWorld rated the Slate 21 Pro four out of five stars, saying that while it was designed for business users, it was a "far better value" than the Slate 21 for consumer usage, with features that are not included in the older model.
