= WeTab =

MeeGo-based tablet computer

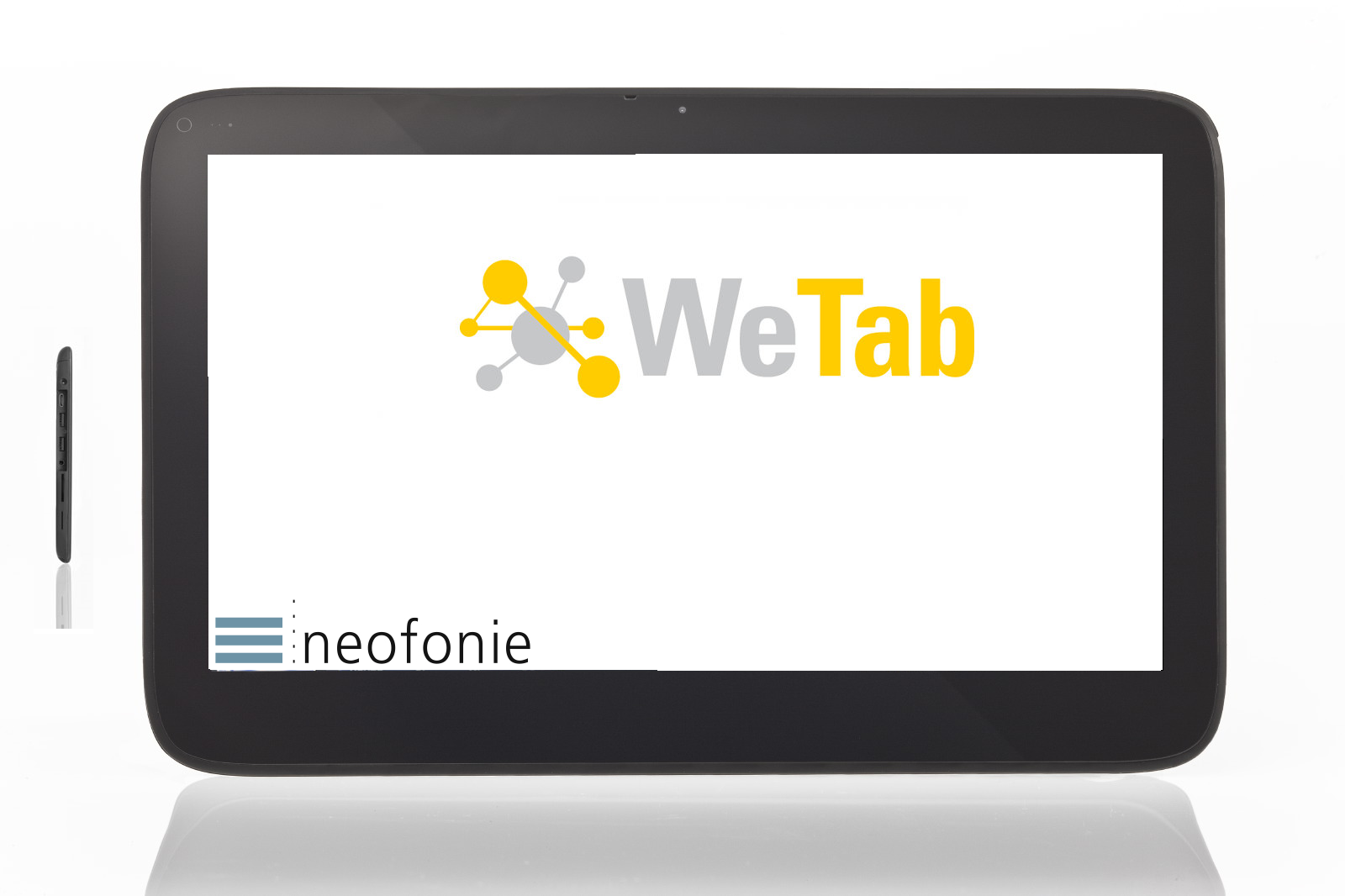
- Developer: WeTab GmbH (formerly a joint venture between Neofonie GmbH and 4tiitoo AG,; now a wholly owned subsidiary of 4tiitoo AG)
- Manufacturer: Pegatron
- Type: Internet tablet
- Operating system: MeeGo
- CPU: 1.66 GHz Intel Atom N450 Pineview-M, with fan
- Memory: 1 GB (RAM)
- Storage: 16 GB (WiFi)/32 GB (WiFi+3G); Extension with SDHC card up to 32 GB possible
- Display: 11.6 in, 1366×768 pixels, colour, multi-touch touchscreen (TN-panel)
- Sound: Stereo speakers and internal microphone
- Input: multi-touch touchscreen
- Camera: 1.3 MPx (Webcam)
- Connectivity: Bluetooth 2.1 + EDR, Wi-Fi (802.11 a/b/g/n), optional 3G (UMTS/HSDPA), USB 2.0, SDHC card reader, Audio output, SIM Card Slot, HDMI 1.3b
- Power: 2–6 hours (battery life)
- Online services: WePad Meta-Store, integrates multiple Stores, Support for native, Java, Linux, and Adobe AIR Apps

WeTab (initially announced as WePad) is a MeeGo-based tablet computer announced by German producer Neofonie in April 2010.

The specifics include an 11.6-inch TN-panel touch screen (1366×768 resolution), a 1.66 GHz Intel Atom N450 processor with fan, 16 GB NAND memory and a total weight of the device of an announced 800 g (1.8 lb), but actually 1.002 kg (2.21 lb).

Most media coverage in relation to the WeTab took place in German. WeTab GmbH began mass marketing in September 2010.

Retailers of the device are Amazon.de and German electronics retail giant Media Markt.

The WeTab runs the Linux-based MeeGo operating system and thus can execute native Linux programs, additionally Adobe AIR applications work. Android apps are supported via Virtual Machine.

== Technical specifications ==
| Model | Wi-Fi | Wi-Fi + 3G |
|---|---|---|
| Announcement date | 12 April 2010 | |
| General availability | September 2010 | |
| Display | 11.6 inches (29 cm) multitouch TN-panel at a resolution of 1366 × 768 pixels | |
| Processor | 1.66 GHz Intel Atom N450 Pineview-M, with fan | |
| Graphics | Intel GMA 3150 graphics | Intel GMA 3150 graphics + PCIe x1 Broadcom CrystalHD BCM70015 |
| Storage | 16 GB | 32 GB (SanDisk pSSD-S2) |
| Storage | Extension with SDHC card up to 32 GB possible | |
| Wireless | Wi-Fi (802.11b/g/n), Bluetooth 2.1+EDR | |
| Wireless | No wireless wide-area network interface | 3G cellular HSDPA/UMTS (850, 1900, 2100 MHz) and GSM/EDGE (850, 900, 1800, 1900 MHz) |
| Geolocation | No | Assisted GPS, cellular network |
| Environmental sensors | Ambient light sensor, Acceleration Sensor | |
| Operating system | MeeGo and Android 2.0 (upgrade planned to 2.2) | |
| Battery | about 6 hours when idle, about 2 hours on high CPU utilization | |
| Weight | 995 g (2.194 lb) | 1,020 g (2.25 lb) |
| Dimensions | 295 mm × 195 mm × 15 mm (11.6 in × 7.7 in × 0.59 in) | |
| Peripherals | 2 × USB integrated, Card reader for SD/SDHC-formats, Audio output, SIM Card Slot, HDMI, 26 pin dock connector | |

== See also ==
- ExoPC - A Canadian Slate Tablet PC with similar OEM hardware, uses Windows 7 as its OS with a custom UI.
- Tablet PC
