= Marketing spending =

Finance term

Marketing spending is an organization's total expenditure on marketing activities. This typically includes advertising and non-price promotion. It sometimes includes sales force spending and may also include price promotions. In a survey of nearly 200 senior marketing managers, 52 percent responded that they found the "marketing spending" metric very useful.

To predict how selling costs change with sales, a firm must distinguish between fixed selling costs and variable selling costs. Recognizing the difference between fixed and variable selling costs can help firms account for the relative risks associated with alternative sales strategies. In general, strategies that incur variable selling costs are less risky because variable selling costs will remain lower in the event that sales fail to meet expectations.

== Purpose ==
This metric's purpose is to forecast marketing spending and assess budgeting risk. Marketing costs are often a major part of a firm's overall discretionary expenditures. As such, they are important determinants of short-term profits. Of course, marketing and selling budgets can also be viewed as investments in acquiring and maintaining customers. From either perspective, however, it is useful to distinguish between fixed marketing costs and variable marketing costs. That is, managers must recognize which marketing costs will hold steady, and which will change with sales. Generally, this classification will require a "line-item by line-item" review of the entire marketing budget.

Rather than varying with unit sales, total variable selling costs are more likely to vary directly with the monetary value of the units sold – that is, with revenue. Thus, it is more likely that variable selling costs will be expressed as a percentage of revenue, rather than a certain monetary amount per unit. The classification of selling costs as fixed or variable will depend on an organization's structure and on the specific decisions of management. A number of items, however, typically fall into one category or the other – with the proviso that their status as fixed or variable can be time specific. In the long run, all costs eventually become variable.

Over typical planning periods of a quarter or a year, fixed marketing costs might include:

- Sales force salaries and support.
- Major advertising campaigns, including production costs.
- Marketing staff.
- Sales promotion material, such as point-of-purchase sales aids, coupon production, and distribution costs.
- Cooperative advertising allowances based on prior-period sales.

Variable marketing costs might include:

- Sales commissions paid to sales force, brokers or manufacturer representatives.
- Sales bonuses contingent on reaching sales goals.
- Off-invoice and performance allowances to trade, which are tied to current volume.
- Early payment terms (if included in sales promotion budgets).
- Coupon face-value payments and rebates, including processing fees.
- Bill-backs for local campaigns (a bill-back requires customers to submit proof of performance to receive payment or credit whereas an off-invoice are simply deducted from invoice totals). These are conducted by retailers but reimbursed by national brand and cooperative advertising allowances, based on current period sales.

Marketers often do not consider their budgets in fixed and variable terms, but they can derive at least two benefits by doing so.

First, if marketing spending is in fact variable, then budgeting in this way is more accurate. Some marketers budget a fixed amount and then face an end-of-period discrepancy or "variance" if sales miss their declared targets. By contrast, a flexible budget – that is, one that takes account of its genuinely variable components – will reflect actual results, regardless of where sales end up. Second, the short-term risks associated with fixed marketing costs are greater than those associated with variable marketing costs. If marketers expect revenues to be sensitive to factors outside their control – such as competitive actions or production shortages – they can reduce risk by including more variable and less fixed spending in their budgets.

A classic decision that hinges on fixed marketing costs versus variable marketing costs is the choice between engaging third-party contract sales representatives versus an in-house sales force. Hiring a salaried – or predominantly salaried – sales force entails more risk than the alternative because salaries must be paid even if the firm fails to achieve its revenue targets. By contrast, when a firm uses third-party brokers to sell its goods on commission, its selling costs decline when sales targets are not met.

== Construction ==
Total selling (marketing) costs ($) = Total fixed selling costs ($) + Total variable selling costs ($)

Total variable selling costs ($) = Revenue ($) * Variable selling cost (%)

Variable costs

There are many types of variable selling costs. For example, selling costs could be based upon a complicated formula, specified in a firm's contracts with its brokers and dealers. Selling costs might include incentives to local dealers, which are tied to the achievement of specific sales targets. They might include promises to reimburse retailers for spending on cooperative advertising. Sales commissions represent one example of selling costs that vary in proportion to revenue. Consequently, any sales commissions should be included in variable selling costs.

Fixed costs

By contrast, payments to a website for a fixed number of impressions or click-throughs, in a contract that calls for specific financial compensation, would more likely be classified as fixed costs. On the other hand, payments for conversions (sales) would be classified as variable marketing costs.
