= Paul Flaherty (computer scientist) =

American computer scientist

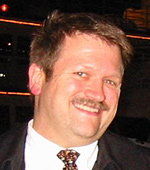
- Flaherty in 2005
- Born: Paul Andrew Flaherty; March 14, 1964; Milwaukee, Wisconsin, U.S.
- Died: March 16, 2006 (aged 42); Belmont, California, U.S.
- Education: Marquette University (BSc); Stanford University (PhD)
- Known for: AltaVista
- Spouse: Natasha Margaret Minenko (m. 1991)
- Scientific career
- Fields: Computer science
- Workplaces: Digital Equipment Corporation

Paul Andrew Flaherty (March 14, 1964 – March 16, 2006) was an American computer scientist. He was a renowned specialist in Internet protocols and the inventor of the AltaVista search engine.

== Biography ==
Flaherty was born in Milwaukee, Wisconsin. He received his bachelor's degree in electrical engineering and mathematics from Marquette University, and his master's degree and PhD in electrical engineering from Stanford University.

He joined Digital Equipment Corporation in 1994 and, as the Associated Press wrote:

Flaherty came up with the idea of indexing Web pages that made the AltaVista search engine one of the most popular Internet search tools in the mid-1990s. Flaherty was working as a research engineer at Digital Equipment Corporation in Palo Alto when he teamed up with two other staff researchers in 1995 to develop AltaVista's technology. The Web site was made public in December 1995 and within weeks was processing several million searches a day. It was spun off from Digital Equipment as a private company in 1999.

He held an amateur radio Extra class license with the call sign N9FZX. He was also president of Stanford Amateur Radio Club.

At age 42, Flaherty died of a heart attack at his home in Belmont, California.
