= IRI (company) =

American data analytics company

- Company type: Private
- Industry: Market research
- Founded: 1979
- Founder: John Malec and Gerry Eskin
- Defunct: 2022
- Fate: Merged into NPD Group
- Successor: Circana
- Headquarters: Chicago, Illinois, United States
- Key people: Kirk Perry, president and chief executive officer
- Owners: Vestar Capital Partners, New Mountain Capital
- Number of employees: 5,000
- Website: www.iriworldwide.com

IRI (Information Resources, Inc.) was a data analytics and market research company headquartered in the United States. The company provided clients with consumer, shopper, and retail market intelligence as well as analysis on consumer packaged goods (CPG), retail, and healthcare industries. It merged with the NPD Group in 2022 to become Circana.

== History ==
Information Resources, Incorporated (IRI) was formed in Chicago in 1979 by market researcher John Malec and Gerald Eskin, a University of Iowa marketing professor. The two purchased scanners for supermarkets to gather point-of-sale data based on bar codes in grocery stores that could be sold to CPG companies to track what customers purchase.

In 1983, IRI became a public company.

By 1993, Fortune magazine named IRI a "company to watch" for expanding into two of its sizeable markets: analyzing nationwide scanner data on consumer products and producing computer software. At that time, slightly more than half of IRI's revenues came from Info scan, its marketing data service.

In late 2003, IRI was acquired by joint-venture cooperation between enterprise software provider Symphony Technology Group and investment capital firm Tennenbaum Capital Partners.

In March 2011, New York-based private equity firm New Mountain Capital bought Symphony IRI and the company announced that it was changing its name back to Information Resources Inc., or IRI.

In April 2013, Symphony IRI Group, Inc. announced that it was rebranding as IRI.

In January 2019, New Mountain Capital and Vestar Capital Partners (“Vestar”) announced that Vestar would lead a new investment in IRI.

The company merged with The NPD Group in 2022. The company name changed to Circana in 2023.

== Management ==
In February 2004, IRI named former Electronic Data Systems Corp executive Scott Klein as its president and CEO, succeeding Joe Durret. Klein was CEO until October 2007, when he moved to IRI's parent company, Symphony Technology Group, and was succeeded by former Salesforce.com executive John Freeland.

In June 2012, Symphony IRI Group, Inc. appointed former Aon COO and McKinsey & Company senior partner Andrew Appel as president and CEO to succeed John G. Freeland, who moved to an interim role as executive vice chairman.

In May 2021, IRI named former Google executive and CPG advertising leader Kirk Perry as president and CEO, succeeding Andrew Appel, who remained in the company as an advisor and member of its board of directors.
