= Vallée de Vin =

- Industry: Wine
- Headquarters: India
- Key people: Ravi Jain; Deepak Roy; Neeraj Deora
- Website: Vallée de Vin

Vallée de Vin is an Indian winery which was founded in 2006. Vallee de Vin was set up in collaboration with Ravi Jain, Deepak Roy and Neeraj Deorah. Vallée de Vin offers five varietals of Zampa still wines, its flagship brand of premium wines and Zampa Soirée range of two premium sparkling wines. Labels from the brand are available in Mumbai, Pune, Delhi, Gurgaon and Goa. In 2012, Vallée de Vin merged with Grover Vineyards to form Grover Zampa, which is today the second largest vineyard in India after Sula Vineyards.

== Vineyard ==
Vallée de Vin's vineyard is located in Sanjegaon, Nashik, nestled in the Sahyadri valley. It currently has 100 acres of vineyard under contract cultivation with local growers. About 550 tonnes of fruit will be sourced from local growers. A Cool Room has been installed at the winery, which ensures that the grapes are cooled and maintained at a temperature of 16 degrees after harvesting, ideal for creating more aromatic and flavorful wines.

== See also ==
- Sommelier India
- Indian wine
