= Nashik valley wine =

Indian wine area

- Geographical indication
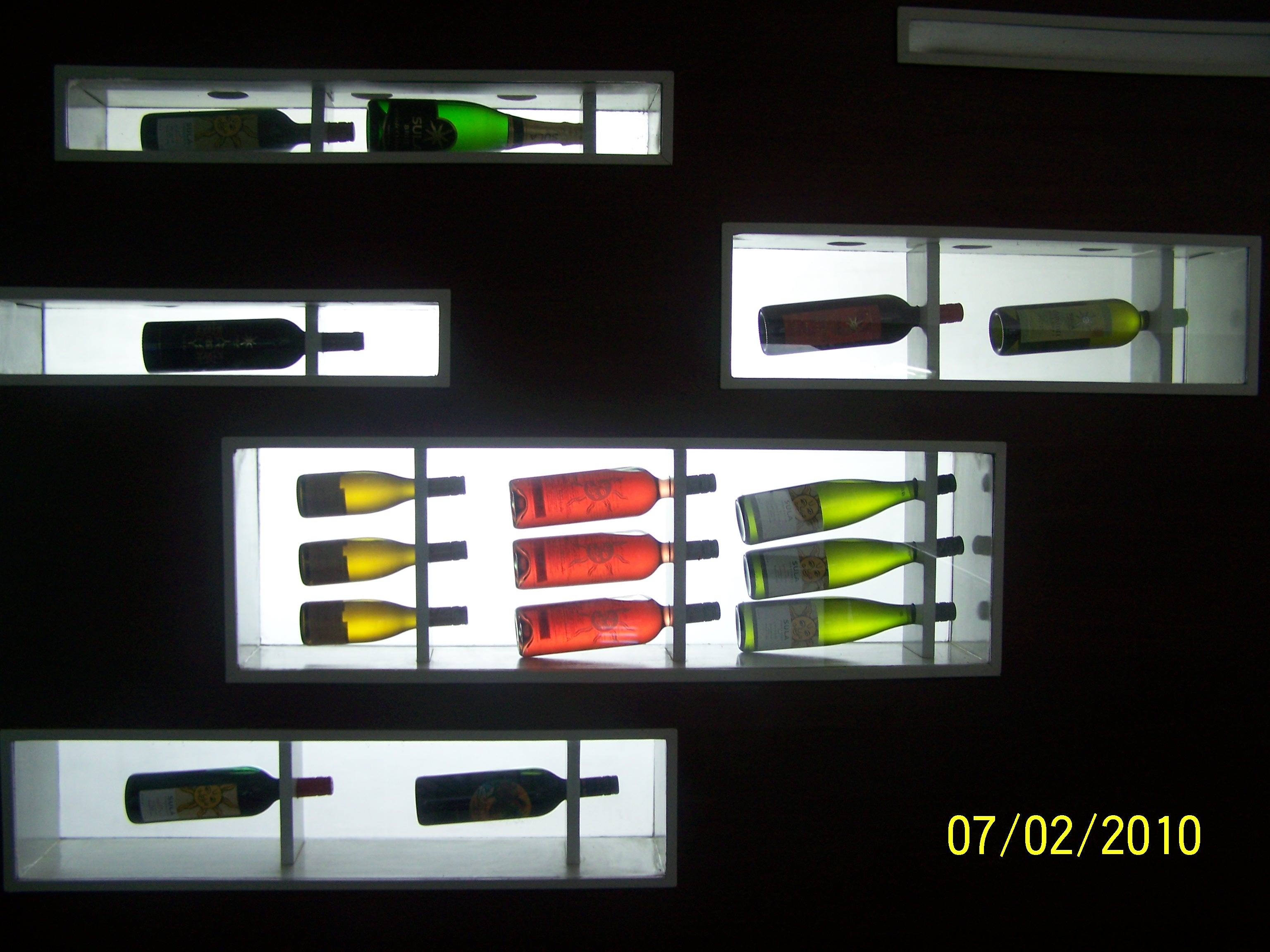
- Wines made in Nashik
- Type: Red and white wines
- Area: Nashik district
- Country: India
- Registered: Application 123
- Material: Wine variety grapes grown in Nashik district

Nashik valley wines are specially protected under the patent of the Geographical Indication in India for the region of Nashik district in Maharashtra, India. Wine in the area is produced from several vineyards, with Sula Vineyards being one of the major producers of wine in Nashik. The wine is produced in two types: red and white. The district has 52 wineries in operation and consequently, Nashik is occasionally known by the epithet "The Wine Capital of India".

The product is protected under the Geographical Indications of Goods (Registration & Protection) Act (GI Act) 1999 of the Government of India. It was registered by the Controller General of Patents Designs and Trademarks under the title "Nashik Valley Wine" and listed at GI Application number 123 under Class 33 as an alcoholic beverage. Under the protection stipulations, at least 80% of the grapes used for making wine are to be grown in the Nashik district, and the wines are to be produced, bottled, and labelled within the district.

== Geography ==
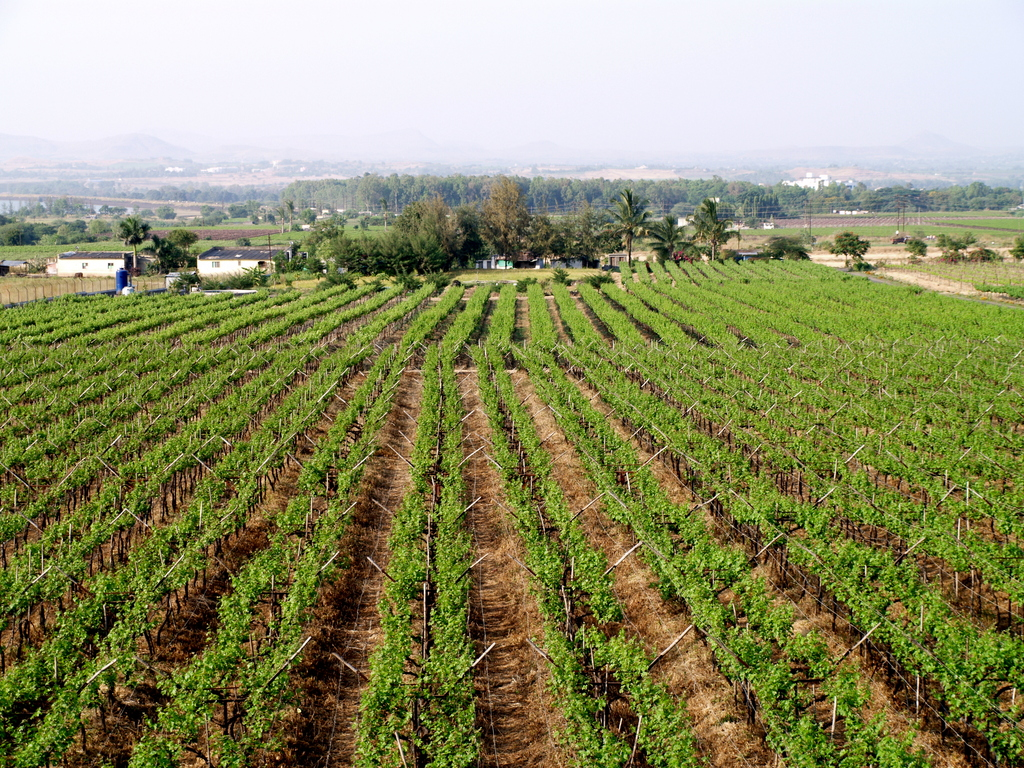
Vineyards

The product is made by societies and several farmers in the Nashik district, which lie within the geographical coordinates of 19°10′00″N 73°16′00″E and 20°53′00″N 75°06′00″E. The terrain is hilly with elevation range of 2,000–2,400 feet (610–730 m) with an inverse climatic condition with warm average day temperature of 26 °C (79 °F) and night cold temperature of 7–8 °C (45–46 °F), which are ideal conditions for the growth of grapes used for making wine with characteristic flavor of the Nashik valley. The soil condition consists of red laterite with good drainage conditions and generally with chemical properties suitable for growing wine grapes. The water quality is also stated to be ideal for growth of quality wine grapes.

The Nashik district has 52 wineries in operation and consequently Nashik is occasionally known by the epithet "The Wine Capital of India. In Nashik, about 8,000 acres (3,200 ha) are under grape wine plantation out of a total area of about 180,000 acres (73,000 ha) under various types of grape cultivation.

== History ==
According to the Nashik district Gazetteer grapes have existed as a horticultural crop in Nashik from 1950s. However, it was only in 1987 that Madhavrao More established a Co-operative Winery known as Pimpane Co-operative Ltd in collaboration with M/s Harbault & Fils Epernary France to produce wine from table grade grapes. Chardonnay and Pinot noir were planted and the Co-operative produced 500,000 bottles out of which 35,000 bottles were exported to France and to some other countries in Europe. But due to problems in harvesting this export was discontinued in 2003.

In 1996, Rajeev Samant, a Stanford graduate who returned to Nashik to farm imported grape varieties Chenin blanc, Sauvignon blanc and Zinfandel planted them in the land owned by his family. In 1997, Kerry Damskey, a leading wine maker from California's Sonoma Valley (the largest wine producer in the Wine Country region) provided the expertise for vinification of wine grapes. The first wine came to be marketed in March 2000 under the trade name "Sula". Several other farmers joined him in propagation of this effort. The wine magazine Sommeliar India, reported that Nashik Valley Wine was first marketed by Sula in 2000.

== Production method ==
The grape varieties grown in the Nashik valley are: Chenin blanc, Sauvignon blanc, Zinfandel, Cabernet Sauvignon, Shiraz, Chardonnay, Merlot, Riesling, Viognier, Tempranillo, Malbec, and so forth, and also Thompson Seedless grapes.

=== Plantation ===
Grape vines (own rooted saplings) used for making wines are normally planted on hill slopes with good drainage conditions at a vine spacing of 8.5 by 4.5 feet (2.6 m × 1.4 m) or 9 by 5 feet (2.7 m × 1.5 m), with a planting density of 2,000 to 3,000 plants per ha. Other methods of planting practices are to adopt "in-situ grafting on dog ridge" or from other root stocks. Planting is done from middle of December to end of January. Harvesting is done from January end to middle of April. Vineyards are protected by trellising. Irrigation is an essential requirement except during the rainy season. Harvesting is done by manual labour. Fertilizers such as Nitrogen, Phosphate, and Potash of appropriate dosages are added as nutrients at specified intervals. Intercultural operations such as rising green manure crops to control soil erosion, conserve moisture by organic mulching and clearing grasses by mowing on the borders at regular intervals are also essentially practised. Pesticides or insecticides are not to be applied; however, fungicides are sprayed and the last such spraying is to be done 45 days before harvesting. Pruning, training the plants to maintain appropriate positions are essential. Harvesting is done during the winter months when the temperature is below 20 °C (68 °F). Harvesting is done by manual labour by collecting best bunches of grapes for crushing.

=== Processing ===
White wines are generally pressed prior to fermentation using a pneumatic press, whereas red wines are usually crushed using a crusher-destemmer prior to fermentation, and then pressed at the end of the ferment. Enzymes are added to facilitate colour separation and decantation. The extracted grape juice (must) is collected in cooling tanks to avoid bacterial contamination and for solid matter to settle at the bottom; cooling is done to reduce the temperature to about 7–10 °C (45–50 °F).

The must is then transferred to another cooling tank where it is retained for about 24 to 26 hours with temperature maintained at about 20 °C (68 °F). Then the must is transferred to stainless steel tanks for the first stage of fermentation and then to oak wood barrels for the malolactic fermentation process. This process takes a minimum of 6 months for red wine. Fermentation is facilitated by adding yeast (usually Saccharomyces cerevisiae and Saccharomyces bayanus in suitable proportion to the fluid being fermented. The fermentation process is done at a controlled temperature of 13–15 °C (55–59 °F) for a period of 15–20 days for white wine and at 25–28 °C (77–82 °F) for 8–10 days for red wine. By this process sugar gets converted to alcohol and the wine is ready for distillation and filtration depending on the status of fomented wine;filtration is done with use of 0.45 micron filter and the wine is filled in bottles. The bottled wine is kept for aging for a minimum of 3 months in the case of red wine and 1–2 months in the case of white wine. It is only after this ageing that the wines are marketed.

== Quality ==
The Nashik valley wine's quality is due to the high altitude at which the grapes are grown and is marked by distinct high acidity with "specific acid-sugar balance." Steven Spurrier, a wine taster, has rated this wine to be between 13 and 17 of ‘Acceptable’ to ‘Very Good’ grade on a 20-point grading system.

== See also ==
Indian wine
