= Grover Zampa =

Indian vineyard

- Location: Doddaballapur, Karnataka, India
- Founded: 1988
- First vintage: 1992
- Key people: Kanwal Grover (Founder); Vivek Chandramohan (CEO); Michel Rolland (Chief Winemaker)
- Other products: Grape seed oil, Grape brandy
- Website: www.groverzampa.in

Grover Zampa is an Indian vineyard and wine producing company located in Doddaballapura, Karnataka.

== History ==
Grover Zampa was started in 1988 by Kanwal Grover who left his job in the space and defence procurement industries to start a winery. His interest in wine making started because of his frequent work related visits to France.

In 1982, Kanwal Grover invited George Vesselle to India. George Vesselle was a world renowned expert in Champagne wines. In 1992, they finally acquired land in Doddaballapura, near Bengaluru and started wine production.

In 2012, Grover Vineyards merged with Vallée de Vin and the new company was christened Grover Zampa. Currently Grover Zampa has vineyards in both Nashik, Maharashtra and Nandi Hills, Karnataka. Grover Zampa's main markets are in the states of Maharashtra and Karnataka.

== Business ==
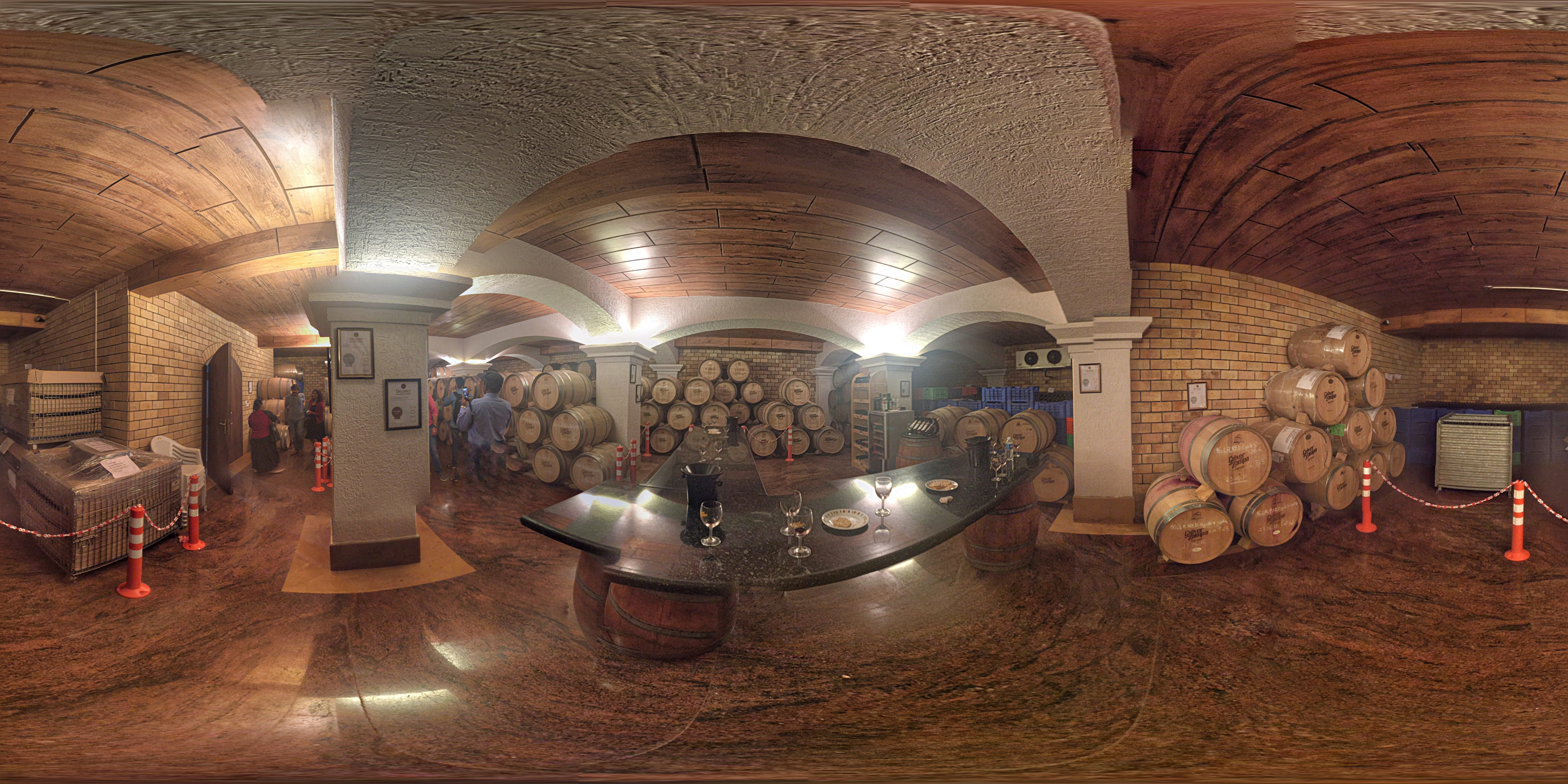
Panoramic view of a wine cellar at the Grover Zampa vineyard

In 2018, Vivek Chandramohan was appointed as CEO of Grover Zampa.

Till date, Grover Zampa has managed to raise capital from wine investor Ravi Viswanathan, Quintela and AVT Group. Visvires Capital and Reliance Capital together hold around 32% stake in Grover Zampa, while the Grover family held 24% stake as of April.

In 2018, Grover Zampa produced 220,000 cases of wine per year putting it in second place after Sula Vineyards which produced more than one million cases of wine. As of 2018, Grover Zampa is the second largest vineyard and wine producing company in India after Sula Vineyards.

== Produce ==
The major wine brands produced by Grover Zampa include:

- Grover Sauvignon Blanc
- Vijay Amritraj Reserve Collection White
- La Reserve Blanc
- Zampa Soiree Brut
- Zampa Soiree Brut Rose
- Shiraz Still Rose
- La Reserve Red
- Chenee Grande Reserve
- Auriga Brut

== Awards and honours ==
In 2017, Grover Zampa was named as the Winery of the Year by Sommelier India, which is India's largest wine magazine.

Grover Zampa was the first vineyard and wine production company in India to produce and grow Tempranillo grapes.

Grover Zampa is also one of the largest wine exporters in India with their produce being exported to Japan, United States and Australia.
