= Nepalese wine =

Wine making in Nepal

Nepalese wine is produced at among the world's highest-elevation vineyards (2,750 m/9,000 ft), along with vintners near Salta, Argentina in the Andes. About fifty brands of wine are produced in Nepal.

In the village of Jomsom, Mustang District, in the Annapurna region, 2 hectares were first planted in 1992.

Due to stringent restrictions on alcohol sales in neighbouring Bihar, India, sales in Nepal are rising among Indian tourists.

Big Master Wines is Nepal's biggest wine-producing company and offers the widest range of wines in the country. Its parent company is Royal Kathmandu Himalaya Beverage Pvt. Ltd. The company is gearing up to officially launch Nepal's first luxury wines, Syrah and Chenin Blanc, under its flagship brand Big Master.

== See also ==
- Alcohol prohibition in India
- Indian wine
- Nepalese cuisine
