= Wine tourism =

Tourism to taste, consume or purchase wine

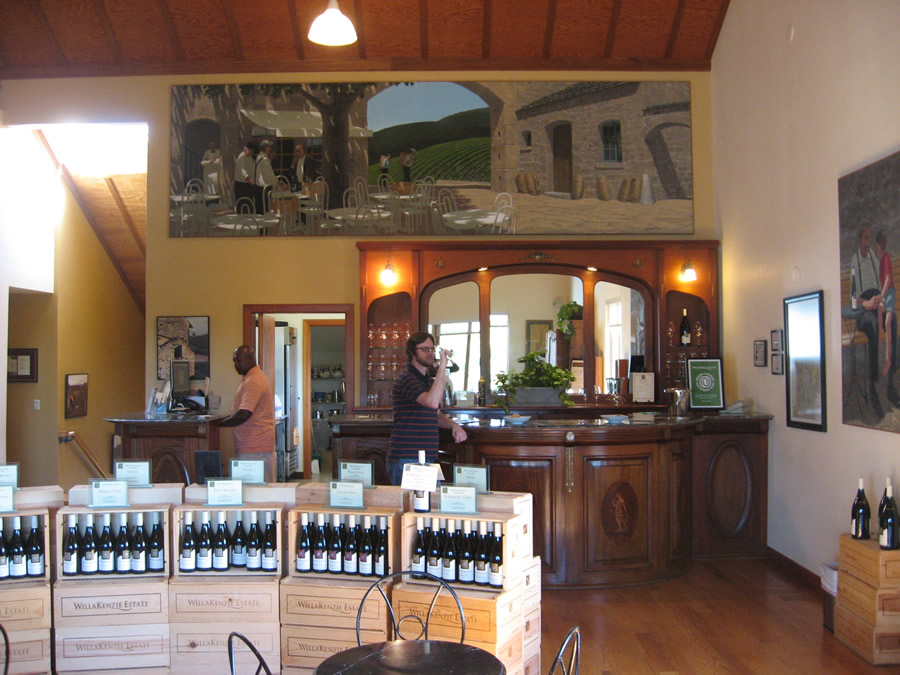
Typical winery tasting room

Wine tourism, enotourism, oenotourism, or vinitourism is tourism whose purpose is or includes the tasting, consumption or purchase of wine, often at or near the source. Unlike other forms of tourism, which are often passive, enotourism may include activities such as visiting wineries, wine tasting, vineyard tours, or actively participating in the wine harvest.

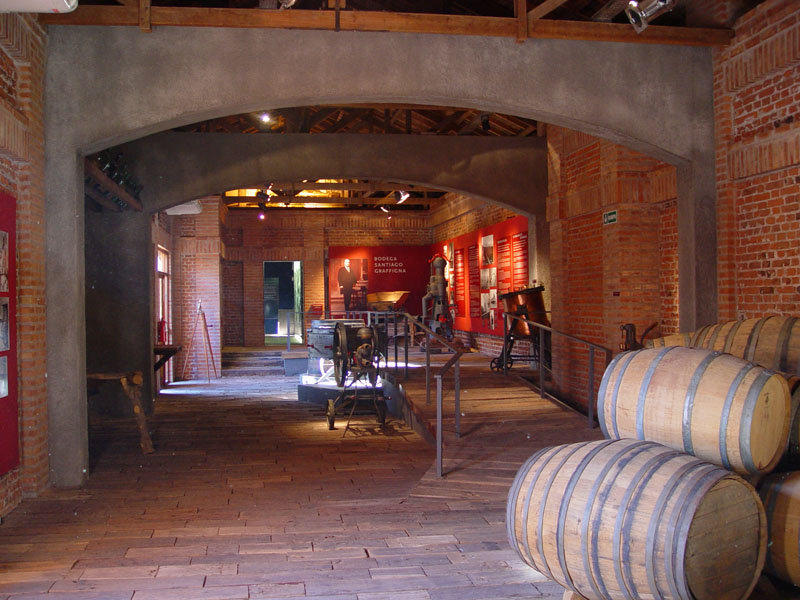
Wine museum at Graffigna, San Juan, Argentina

== History ==
Enotourism is a relatively new form of tourism. Its history varies greatly from region to region, but in places such as the Napa Valley AVA and Wine Country, it saw heavy growth once a concerted marketing effort was implemented in 1975 that was given a further boost by the 1976 Judgment of Paris.

Other regions, such as Catalonia, Spain have only started marketing enotourism starting in the mid-2000s, primarily focusing on how it is an alternative form of tourism to the beach for which Spain is overall known.

There was also a rise in the profile of enotourism among English speakers with the 2004 release of the film, Sideways whose two central characters visit wineries and wine in the Santa Barbara region of Southern California.

The wine tourism industry grew significantly throughout the first decade of the 21st century. In the United States 27 million travelers, or 17% of American leisure travelers, engaged in culinary or wine-related activities. In Italy the figure stands at approximately five million travelers, generating 2.5 billion euros in revenue.

"Enotourism Day" is celebrated on the second Sunday of November each year to promote cellar visits in Germany, Austria, Slovenia, Spain, France, Greece, Hungary, Italy, and Portugal. In North America, the first Wine Tourism Day was established for May 11, 2013 with events scheduled throughout the continent.

Chile has grown its enotourism industry in recent years, with several tourist routes being opened throughout the country, with several of them offering overnight accommodations.

Sula Vineyard, Samba wine, Samba Wine and Chateau d'Ori in Nasik, Maharashtra, Chateau Indage Narayangaon, as well as Grover Vineyard in Nandi Hills, Karnataka are some of the popular wine tourism destinations in India. Famous Winefest is held in Sula, in February every year. Ten thousands of people visit this famous wine carnival every year.

== Activities ==
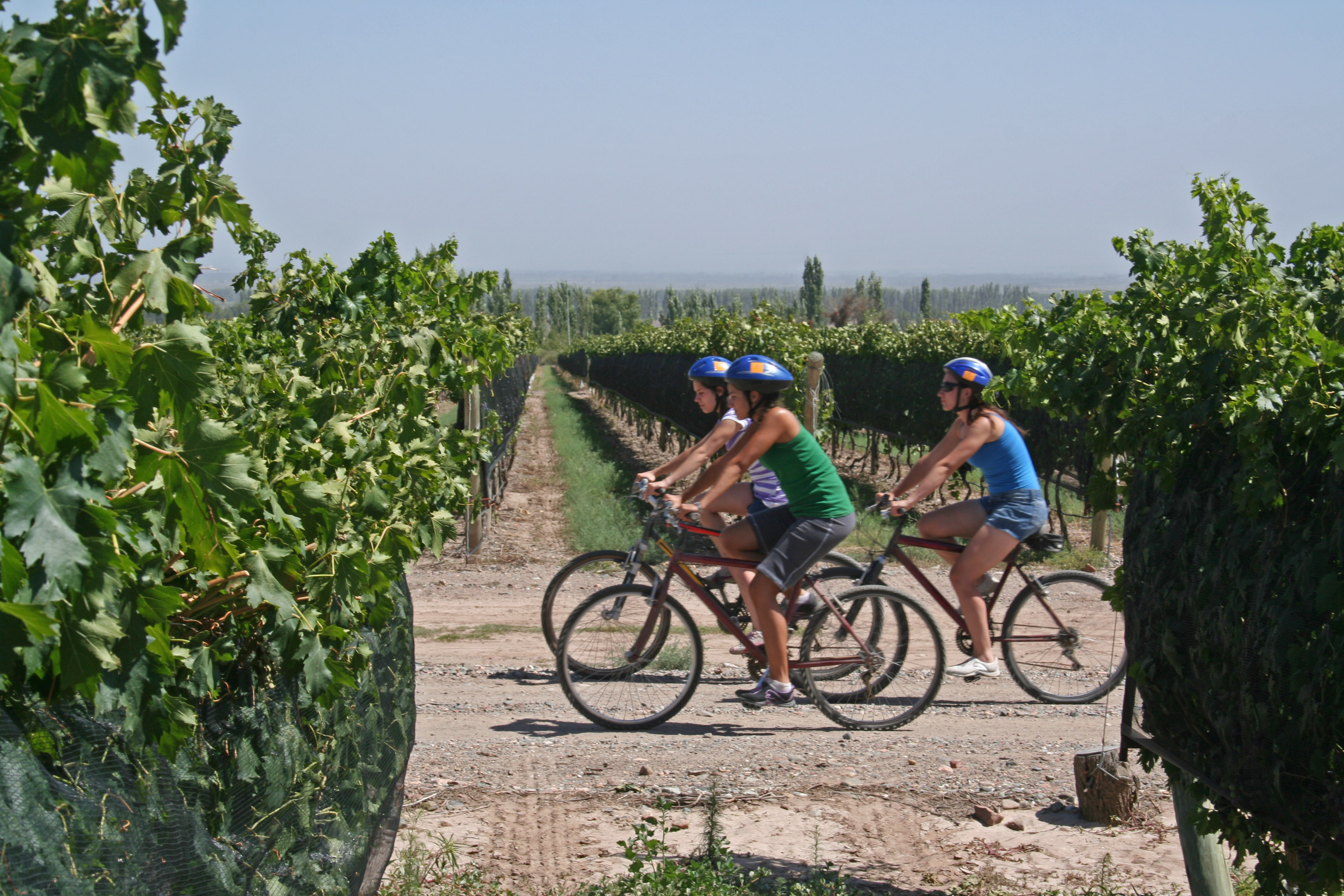
Cycling through vineyards in Mendoza, Argentina

Most visits to the wineries take place at or near the site where the wine is produced. Visitors typically learn the history of the winery, see how the wine is made, and then taste the wines. At some wineries, staying in a small guest house at the winery is also offered. Many visitors buy the wines made by the winery at the premises, accounting for up to 33% of their annual sales.

Very small, low production regions such as Priorat, Catalonia focus on small, intimate visits with the owner as the host and include walks through the vineyards to help visitors understand the unique qualities of the region.

More elaborate tastings can include horizontal and vertical tastings as well as full meals focused upon showcasing the wines.

As the enotourism industry matures, additional activities have been added to visits such as riding electrically assisted bicycles, called, "burricleta".

Harvest experience tours, also known as "harvest internships" or "crush camps," are tours or programs that allow visitors to experience the winemaking process firsthand by participating in the grape harvesting and crushing process. These tours are usually offered during the grape harvesting season, which varies depending on the region and the type of grapes being harvested. Harvest experience tours can be a fun and educational way to learn about the winemaking process and to see behind the scenes at a working winery. The winery benefits from essentially free labor during the most demanding periods of wine production while participants may later be able to enjoy wines they personally had a hand in creating.

Other experiences include "wine and food pairing" tours, where visitors can learn about the art of pairing different wines with specific dishes, and cooking classes.

== Wine Regions Around the World ==
=== Georgia ===
Georgia is considered the cradle of wine, with archaeological evidence tracing winemaking back over 8,000 years. The country's wine tourism centers around ancient traditions such as qvevri winemaking (using clay vessels buried underground) and *Rtveli*, the traditional grape harvest festival. Key wine regions include Kakheti, Imereti, Racha-Lechkhumi, and Kartli, where visitors can tour family-owned vineyards, taste indigenous grape varieties like Saperavi and Rkatsiteli, and experience authentic Georgian hospitality.

Wine tourism in Georgia has grown significantly in recent years, supported by both government initiatives and private investment in rural tourism infrastructure. Many wineries offer immersive experiences, including winemaking workshops, food-and-wine pairings, and overnight stays at vineyards.

=== Italy ===
Italian wine offers a diverse array of styles and grape varieties, with many options catering to fans of popular international wines. For example, Trebbiano serves as an alternative to Chardonnay, while Vermentino mirrors the crispness of Sauvignon Blanc. Barbera offers a fruit-forward option for Pinot Noir lovers, and Super-Tuscans provide a bold counterpart to Cabernet Sauvignon. Primitivo, genetically related to Zinfandel, is another notable variety. Key wine regions include Marche and Abruzzo, known for juicy Montepulciano wines such as Montepulciano d'Abruzzo and Rosso Conero, and Piedmont, home to the powerful and floral Nebbiolo grape found in wines like Barolo and Barbaresco. Tuscany is renowned for its Sangiovese-based wines, including Chianti and Brunello di Montalcino. Emerging trends across these regions include a focus on native grape varieties and a move away from international blends, particularly in areas like Chianti Classico and Alto Piemonte, where producers are reviving traditional practices to highlight Italy’s rich viticultural heritage.

=== United States ===
==== California ====
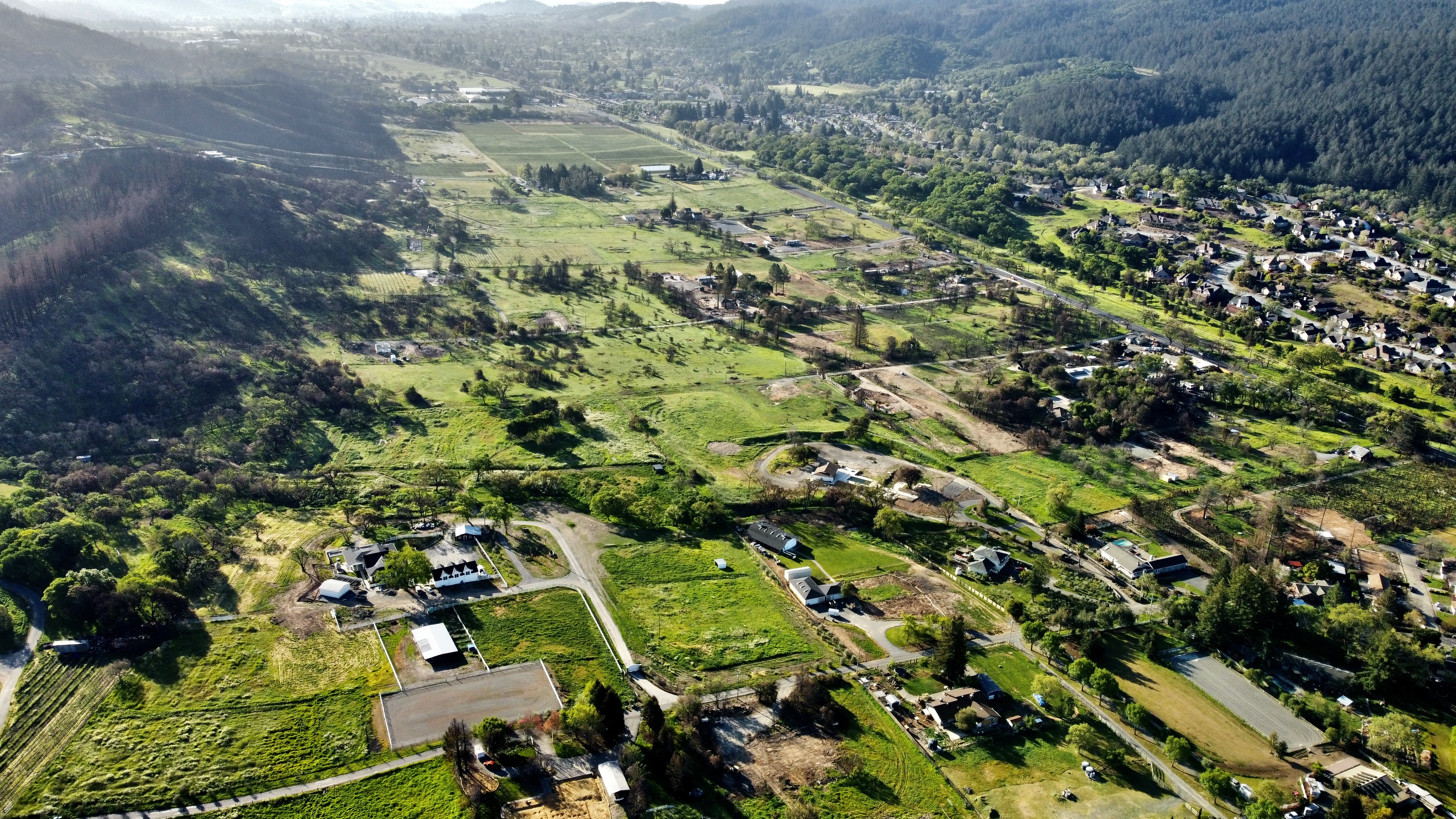
Birds-eye view of Sonoma Valley

California is home to over 4,800 wineries, making it one of the world's premier wine-producing regions. The state’s most well-known wine areas include Napa Valley and Sonoma County, both renowned for their high-quality vineyards and wine tourism. In recent years, other regions such as Paso Robles, Santa Barbara, the SLO Coast, Anderson Valley, and Lake County have risen in prominence for their unique terroirs and growing wine industries. California's diverse climate and geography support the cultivation of a wide range of grape varieties, with the seven most commonly grown being Cabernet Sauvignon, Chardonnay, Pinot Noir, Sauvignon Blanc, Zinfandel, Merlot, and Syrah.

=== Australia ===
==== Shiraz ====
Considered Australia’s flagship red grape, Shiraz is known for producing bold and flavorful wines.

- Rich, full-bodied, and often spicy in character
- Barossa Valley: intense, concentrated fruit flavors
- McLaren Vale and Hunter Valley: more elegant styles with softer tannins

==== Cabernet Sauvignon ====
Australia’s Cabernet Sauvignon showcases regional diversity, particularly in Coonawarra and Margaret River.

- Coonawarra: grown in terra rossa soils, producing intense blackcurrant and mint flavors
- Margaret River: elegant wines with notes of black cherry, tobacco, and eucalyptus

==== Chardonnay ====
Chardonnay is one of Australia's most prominent white wine grapes, offering a range of expressions based on terroir.

- Yarra Valley: citrus, green apple, and stone fruit flavors with slight oak influence
- Adelaide Hills: crisp and elegant style
- Margaret River: rich, complex, and balanced Chardonnay

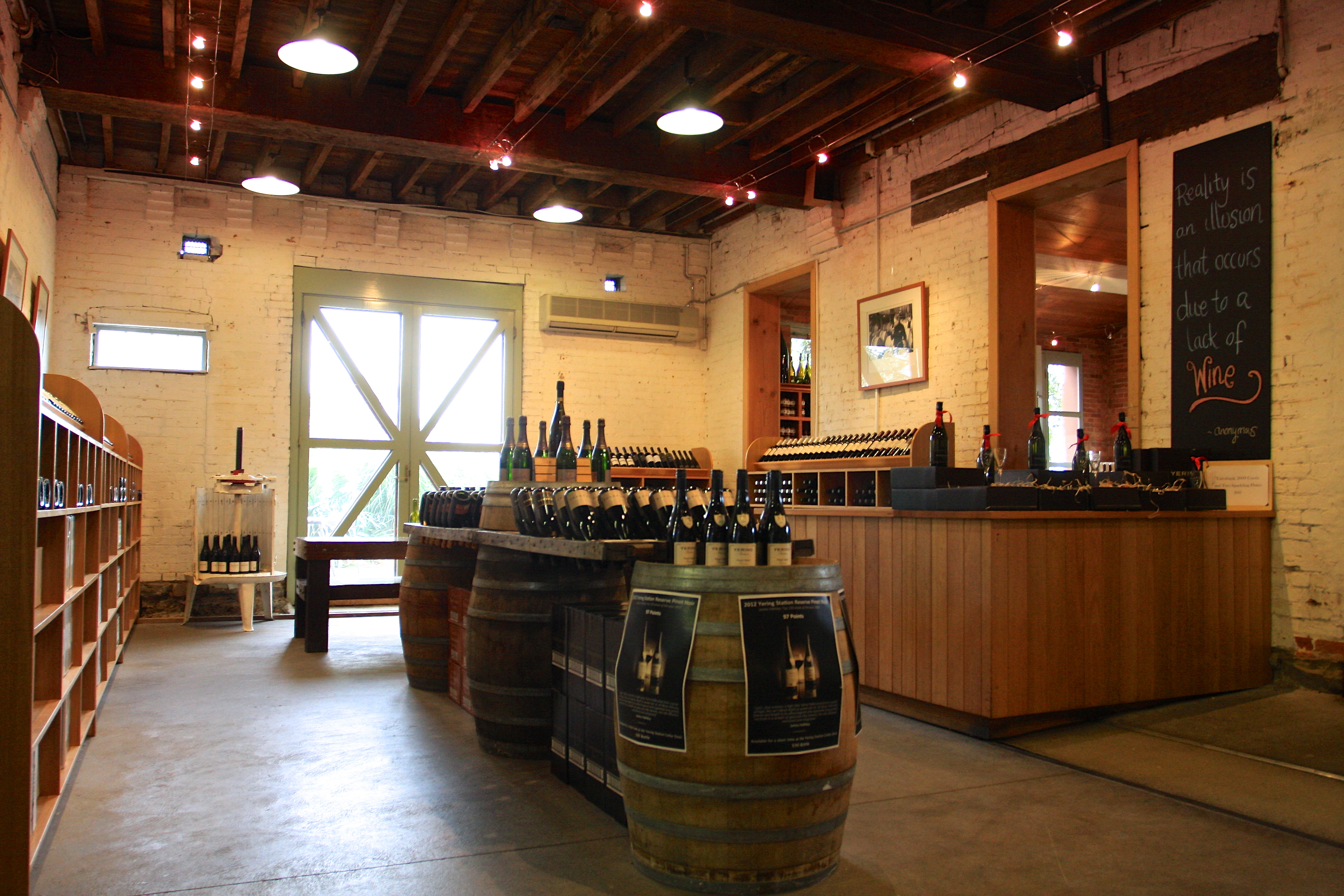
Inside of a winery in the Yarra Valley of Australia

==== Pinot Noir ====
Pinot Noir thrives in Australia’s cooler wine regions, producing delicate and nuanced wines.

- Yarra Valley and Mornington Peninsula: red fruit flavors, soft tannins, and light to medium body
- Tasmania: more earthy and savory tones with bright acidity

==== Semillion ====
Semillon is a distinctive white grape known for its aging potential, particularly in the Hunter Valley.

- Youthful wines: zesty and citrusy
- Aged wines: more complex with toasty, honeyed flavors
- Hunter Valley: famous for producing age-worthy Semillon

==== Riesling ====
Riesling in Australia is typically dry, with high acidity and crisp, vibrant flavors.

- Common flavor notes: lime, green apple, floral
- Clare Valley: known for minerality and structure
- Eden Valley: known for floral characteristics and elegance

==== Grenache ====
Grenache is a red grape that produces medium-bodied, fruit-forward wines and is often used in blends.

- Flavors: strawberry, raspberry, and subtle spice
- Key regions: Barossa Valley and McLaren Vale

==== Viognier ====
Viognier is an aromatic white grape originally from France, now gaining popularity in Australian cool-climate regions.

- Yarra Valley: notes of white peach, nectarine, and floral aromas
- Adelaide Hills: produces Viognier with varied flavor profiles influenced by unique terroir

==== Sauvignon Blanc ====
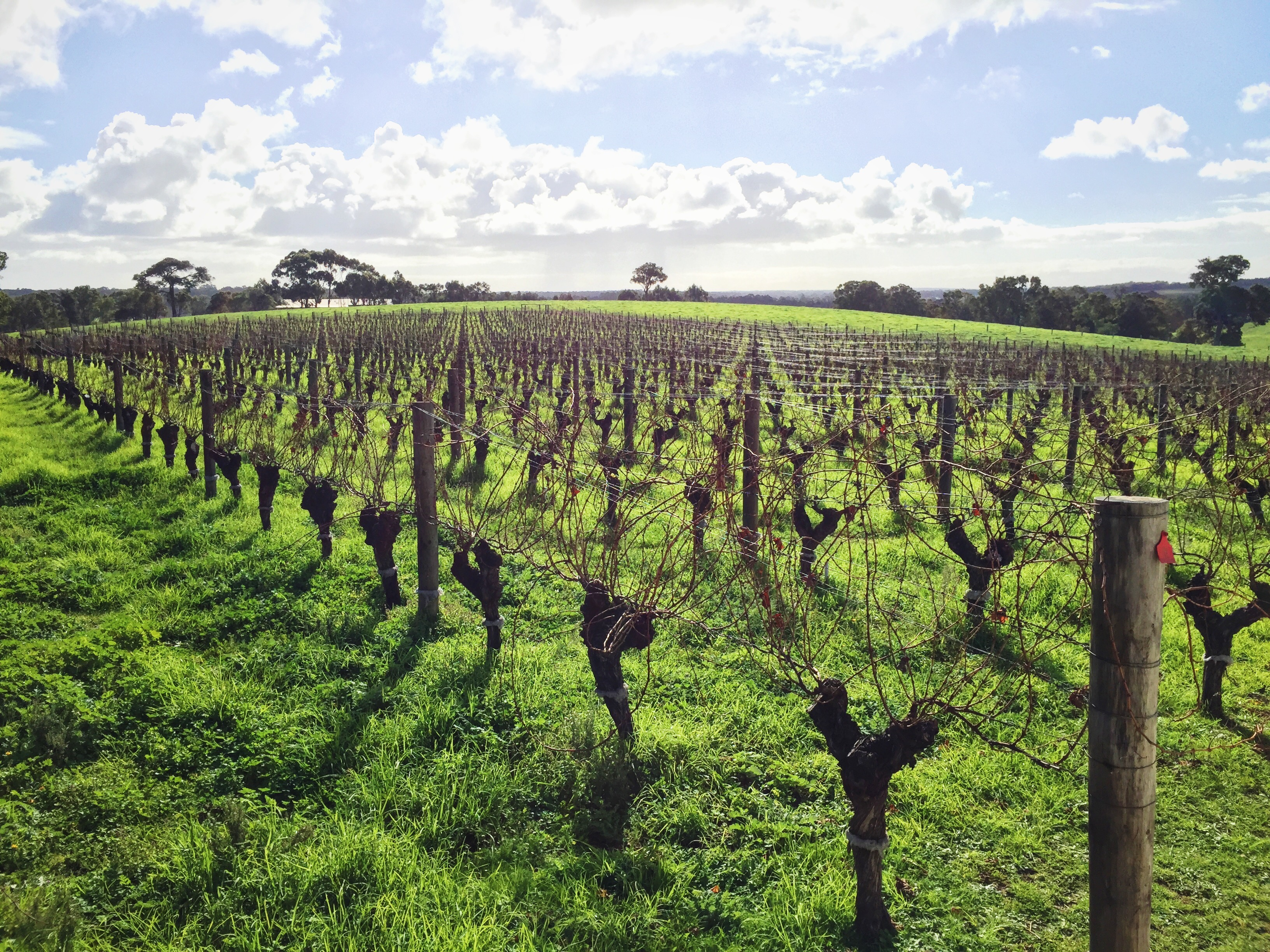
A vineyard in the Margaret River region of Australia

Sauvignon Blanc in Australia is appreciated for its vibrancy and expressive aromatics.

- Flavor profile: passion fruit, gooseberry, and citrus
- Key regions: Adelaide Hills and Margaret River, known for high-quality expressions

== Future ==
Most tourism agencies see it as a segment of the industry with tremendous growth potential, stating that in some regions, it's only functioning at 20% of its full potential.

As enotourism grows, regions such as Napa Valley have to deal with continued success and the effects that come with it, such as crowds and increased tasting room fees. This can, in turn have the opposite effect desired wherein potential visitors are driven away and turned off enotourism.

Many wine tourists are increasingly interested in visiting wineries that use sustainable practices and are environmentally responsible.
