= Rajeev Samant =

Indian businessman

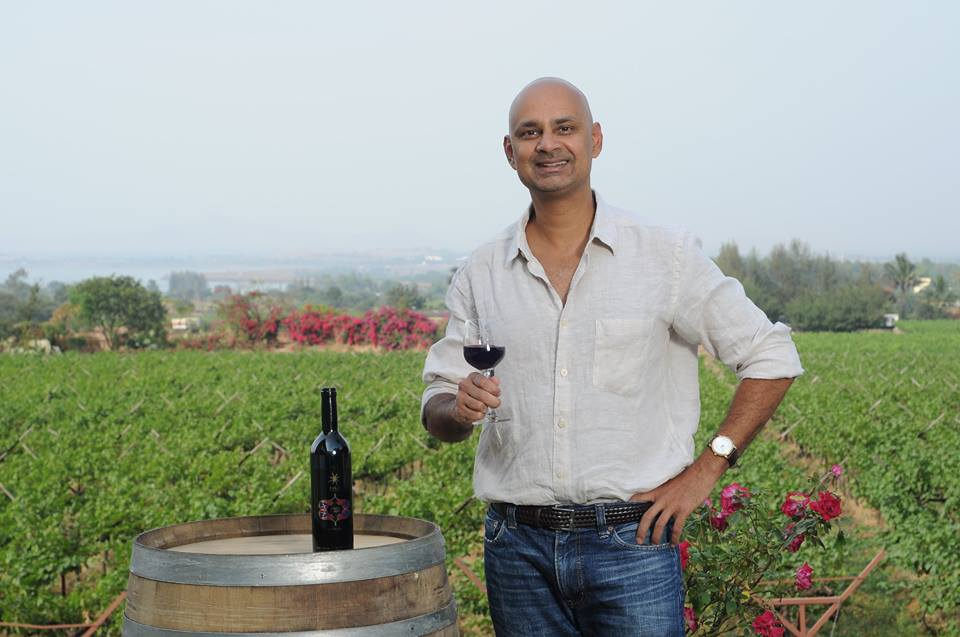
Rajeev Samant at Sula's vineyards in Nashik

Rajeev Suresh Samant is the founder and CEO of Sula Vineyards, India's largest winery.

== Education and early career ==
Born in Mumbai, Samant completed his education from Stanford University where he received a bachelor's degree in Economics, followed by a master's degree in Engineering Management.

He then joined Oracle Corporation as one of the youngest managers there. However, after a couple of years, he quit and decided to return to India and start something of his own.

== Sula Vineyards ==
After backpacking around the world for a year, Samant returned to India where he decided to live the rural life. He started farming mangoes, roses, teak wood, and table grapes at his family's 20-acre plot in Nashik. In 1996, he had an epiphany when realized that Nashik had the perfect climate for growing wine grapes. His determination grew when he returned to California and met with Kerry Damskey, an eminent winemaker, who enthusiastically agreed to help him start a winery.

In 1997, the duo took the revolutionary step of not only being the first to grow wine grapes in this region, but also planting varietals such as the French Sauvignon Blanc and Californian Chenin Blanc that had never been planted before in India. In 1998, Sula Vineyards was established, and launched their first wines released in 2000.

Today, Sula Vineyards is India's largest wine producer and holds a market share of 65%. They are also pioneers in Indian wine and started facilities like a tasting room and at their winery in 2005. Sula is also the only Indian wine company to be present in all price and product segments including Red, White, Rose, Sparking and Dessert wines.

== Personal life ==
In 2016, Samant married his girlfriend Margarita Andronova in a church wedding at Siolim, Goa while meeting her in Spain. The couple has one daughter.
