= Chateau Indage =

Indian winery

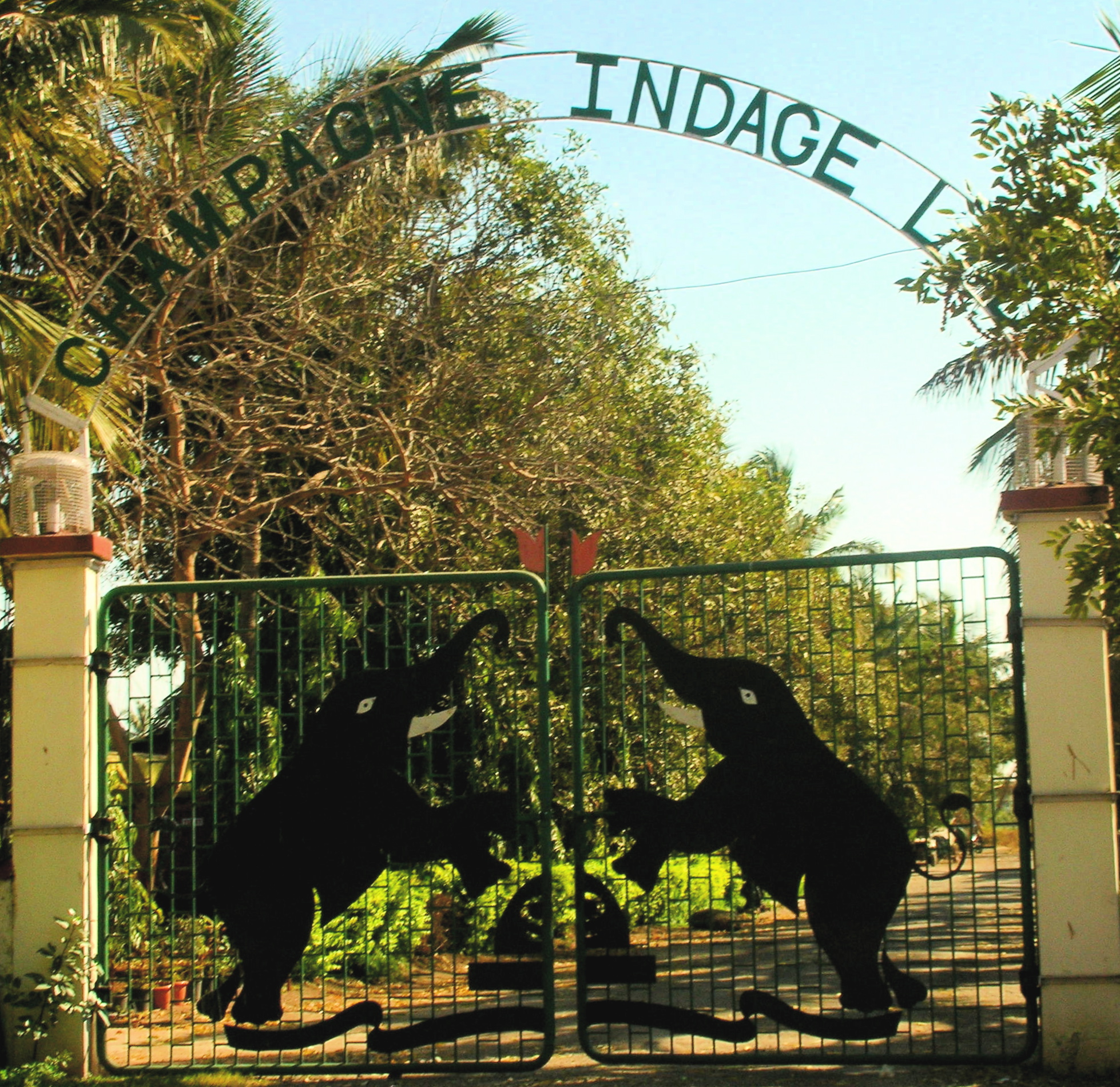
Entrance to Chateau Indage

Cheateau Indage is an Indian winery located in Narayangaon, which is located close to Pune. Cheateau Indage was founded by Shyamrao Chowgule in 1982 after two years of research by Champagne Technologies of France. They have three facilities – one each in Narayangaon, Nashik and Himachal Pradesh.

== History ==
On a business trip to Paris, Chougule fell in love with champagnes and decided to produce sparkling wine in Maharashtra, where he started a winery in 1984. He first named the company Champagne India Ltd, changing it to C.I. Ltd. when the French raised an objection, and finally to Chateau Indage Ltd. He started exporting his bubbly in 1986 under the labels Omar Khayyam, under consultancy from Piper Heidsieck. It was after he was allowed to sell 25% to the Indian market, he started Marquis de Pompadour (MDP) and made it a household name. Eventually he imported a complete plant with a capacity of 750,000 bottles, then costing Rs. 7 Crore (Rs. 70 million), as also the special yeast from France for the second fermentation.

== Today ==
The company achieved great heights, selling wine under multiple labels such as Riviera, Chantilli and Tiger Hills, winning international awards and at one time was exporting to almost 70 nations. The parent company, Indage Vintners, was even listed on the Bombay Stock Exchange and had about 60% market share by around 2006. Eventually, a few investment decisions led to the company falling into debt and being ordered by the courts to liquidate its assets.

The founder, Shamrao Chougule, died in August 2020, and is survived by sons Ranjit and Vikrant.
