= Indian wine =

Wine making in India

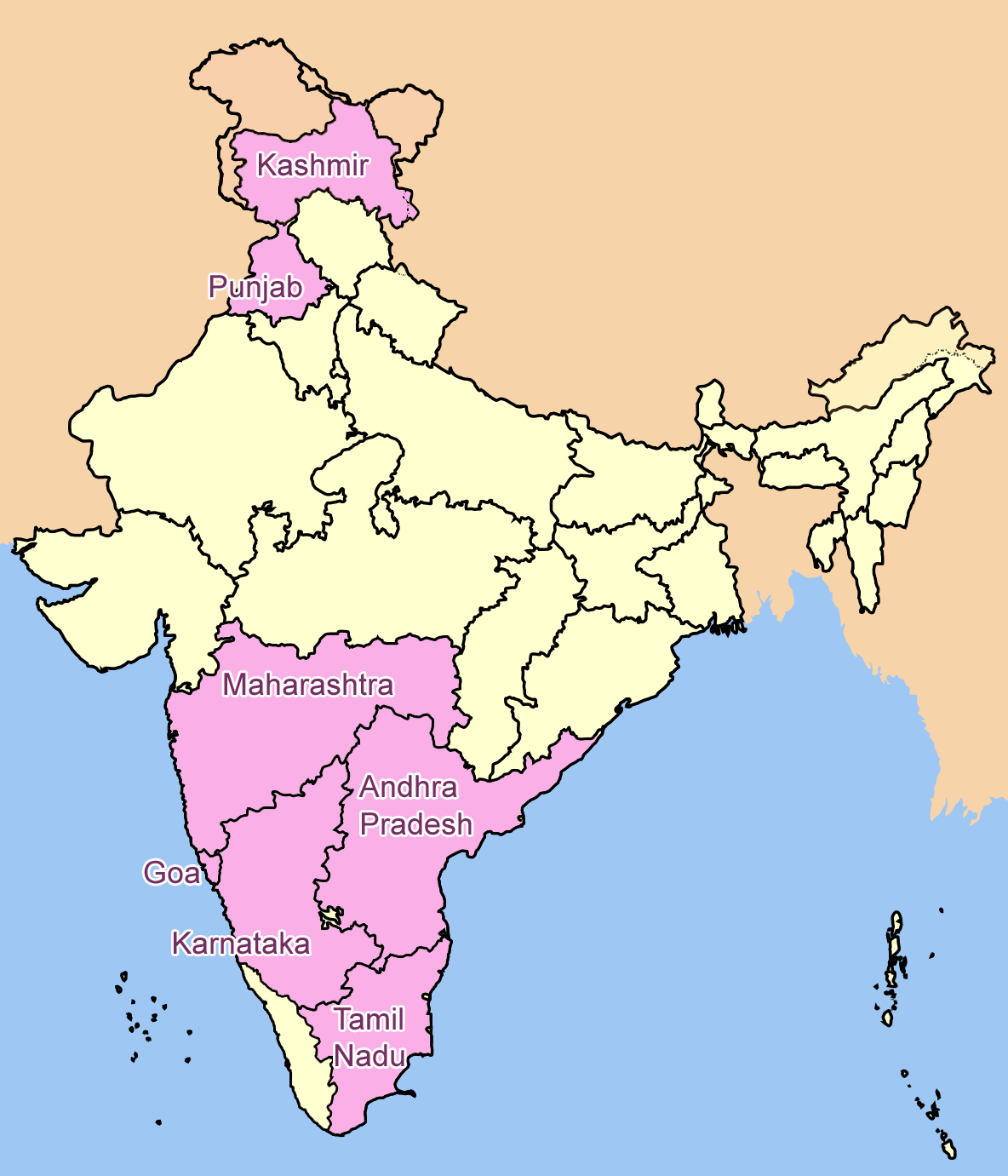
The major wine regions of India highlighted. To the north is Kashmir and Punjab. To the south (clockwise from top) is Maharashtra, Andhra Pradesh, Tamil Nadu, Karnataka, and Goa.

The modern wine market in India is small but growing; annual per capita consumption of wine in the country is a mere 9 millilitres, approximately 1/8000th that of France. Hard liquor and beer has nearly 98% of the alcoholic drinks market, with wine taking 2%. The viticulture in India has a long history, dating back to the time of the Indus Valley civilization when grapevines were believed to have been introduced from Persia. Winemaking has existed throughout most of India's history but was particularly encouraged during the time of the Portuguese and British colonization of the subcontinent. The end of the 19th century saw the phylloxera louse take its toll on the Indian wine industry, followed by religious and public opinion moving towards the prohibition. Following the country's independence from the British Empire, the Indian government encouraged vineyards to convert to table grape and raisin production. In the 1980s and 1990s, a revival in the Indian wine industry took place as international influences and the growing middle class started increasing demand for the beverage. By the turn of the 21st century, demand was increasing at a rate of 20-30% a year. The city of Nashik in the state of Maharashtra is called the "Wine Capital of India".

== History ==
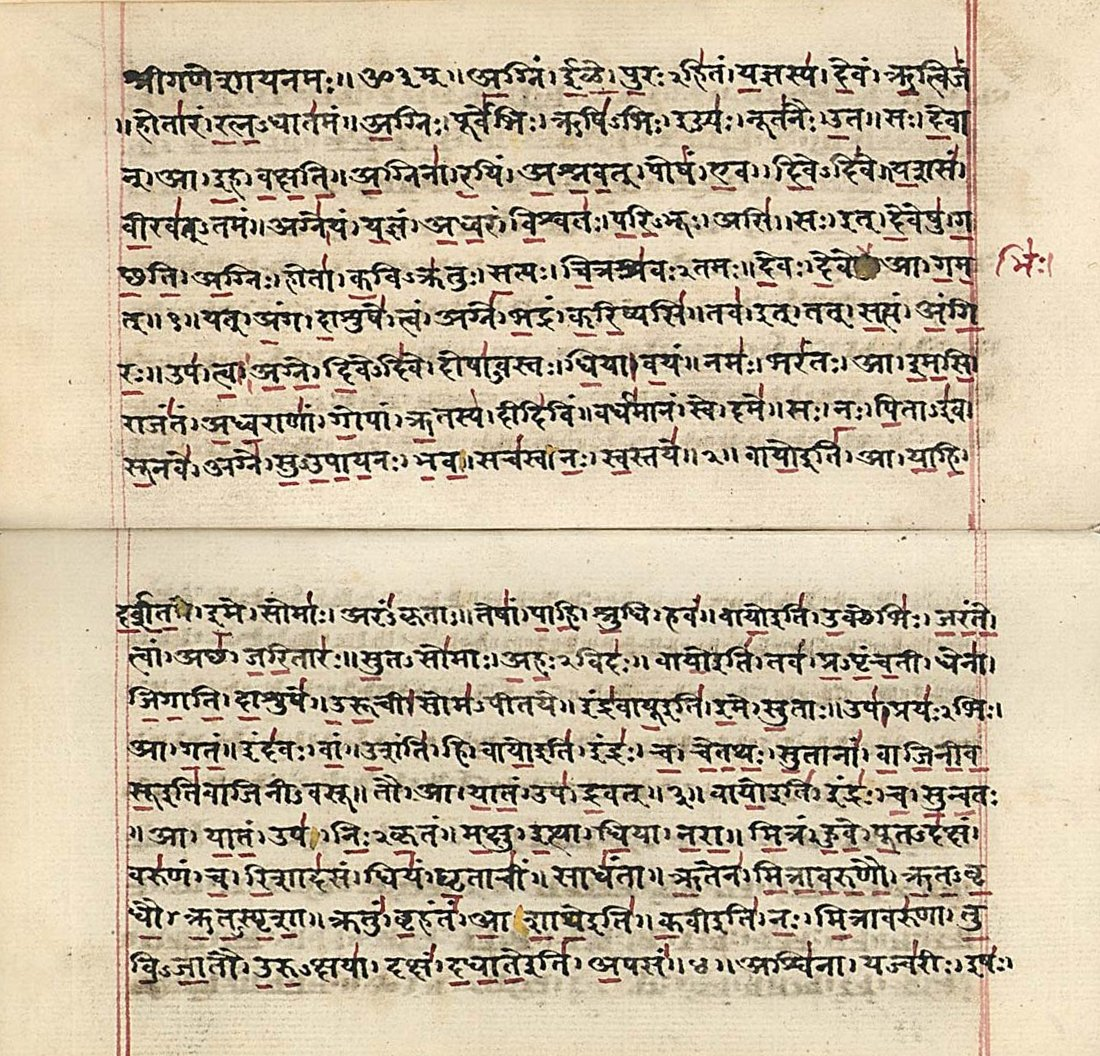
A 19th century reproduction of the Rigveda.

Regarding the first wines of India, historians believe that these early plantings were used mostly for table grapes or grape juice rather than the production of an alcoholic beverage. During the Vedic period of the 2nd and 1st millennia, the tribes of the region indulged in intoxicating drinks pressed from plants, but the Vedas do not mention grape wine. The religious text of the Vedas mentions at least one alcoholic drink that may have been wine related -sura which seems to have been a type of rice wine that was fermented with honey.. The first known mention of grape-based wines was in the late 4th century BC writings of Chanakya, who was the chief minister of Mauryan Emperor Chandragupta Maurya. In his writings, Chanakya condemns the use of alcohol while chronicling the emperor and his court's frequent indulgence of a style of grape wine known as Madhu.

In the centuries that would follow, wine became the privileged drink of the Kshatriya or dominant class while the oppressed caste typically drank alcohol made from wheat, barley and millet. Under the rule of the Muslim Mughal Empire, alcohol was prohibited in accordance with Islamic dietary laws. However, there are written reports about at least one Mughal ruler, Jahangir and Babur for example, who were fond of wine. In the 16th century, Portuguese colonists at Goa introduced port-style wine and the production of fortified wines soon spread to other regions. Under British rule during the Victorian era, viticulture and winemaking was strongly encouraged as a domestic source for the British colonists. Vineyards were planted extensively through the Baramati, Kashmir and Surat regions. In 1883 at the Calcutta International Exhibition, Indian wines were showcased to a favorable reception. The Indian wine industry was reaching a peak by the time the phylloxera epidemic made its way to country and devastated its vineyards.

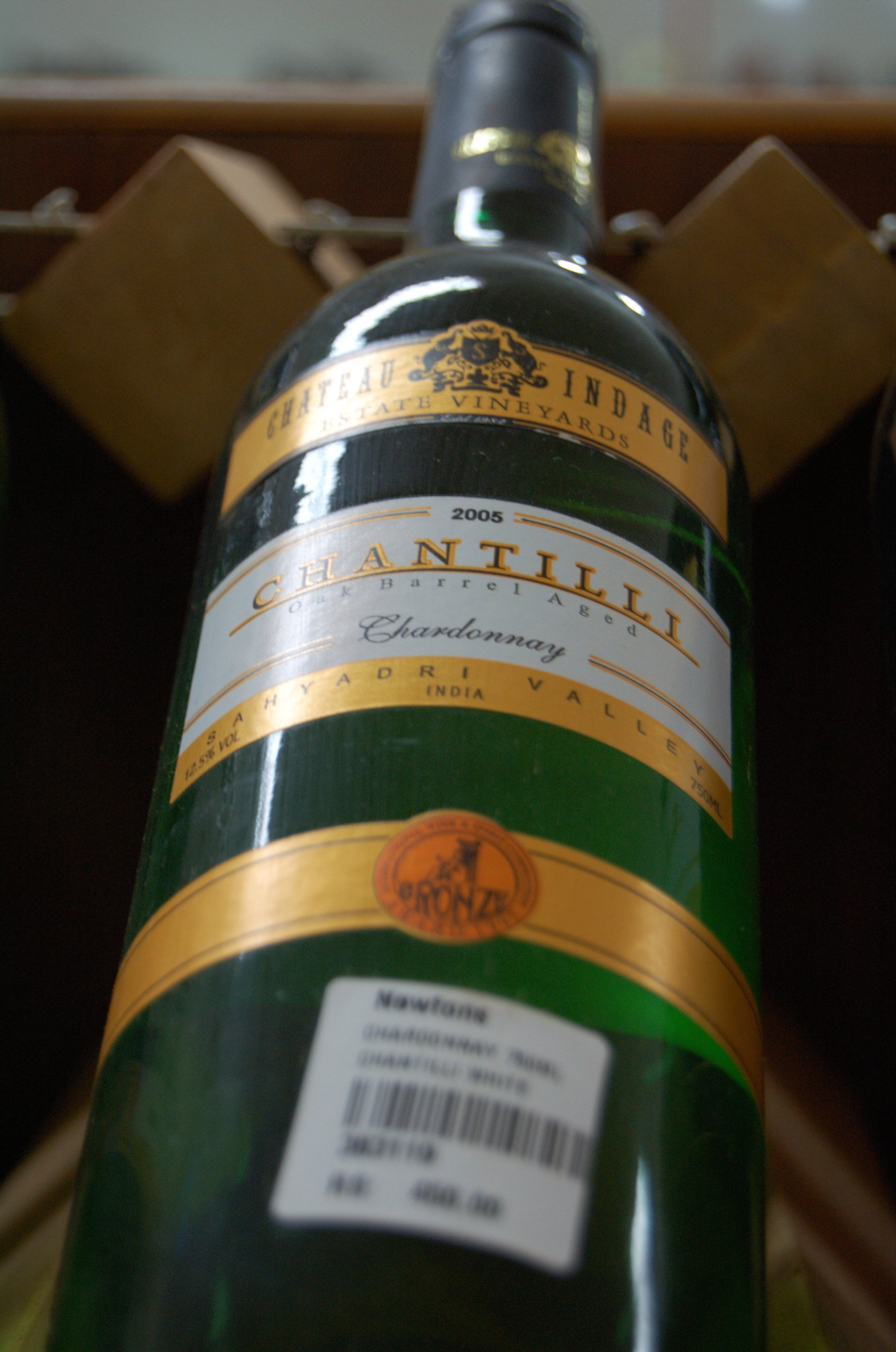
Indian variant of Chardonnay sparkling wine

It was a long road for the Indian wine industry to recover from the devastation at the end of the 19th century. Unfavorable religious and public opinion on alcohol developed and culminated in the 1950s when many of India's states prohibited alcohol. Vineyards were either uprooted or encouraged to convert to table grape and raisin production. Some areas, like Goa, continued to produce wine but the product was normally very sweet and highly alcoholic. The turning point of the modern Indian wine industry occurred in the early 1980s with the founding of The Tonia Group in the state of Goa. With the assistance of French winemakers, The Tonia Group began to import Vitis vinifera grape varieties like Cabernet Sauvignon, Chardonnay, Pinot blanc, Pinot noir and Ugni blanc and started making still and sparkling wines. Other wineries soon followed as the emergence of India's growing middle class fueled the growth and development of the Indian wine industry.

== Climate and geography ==
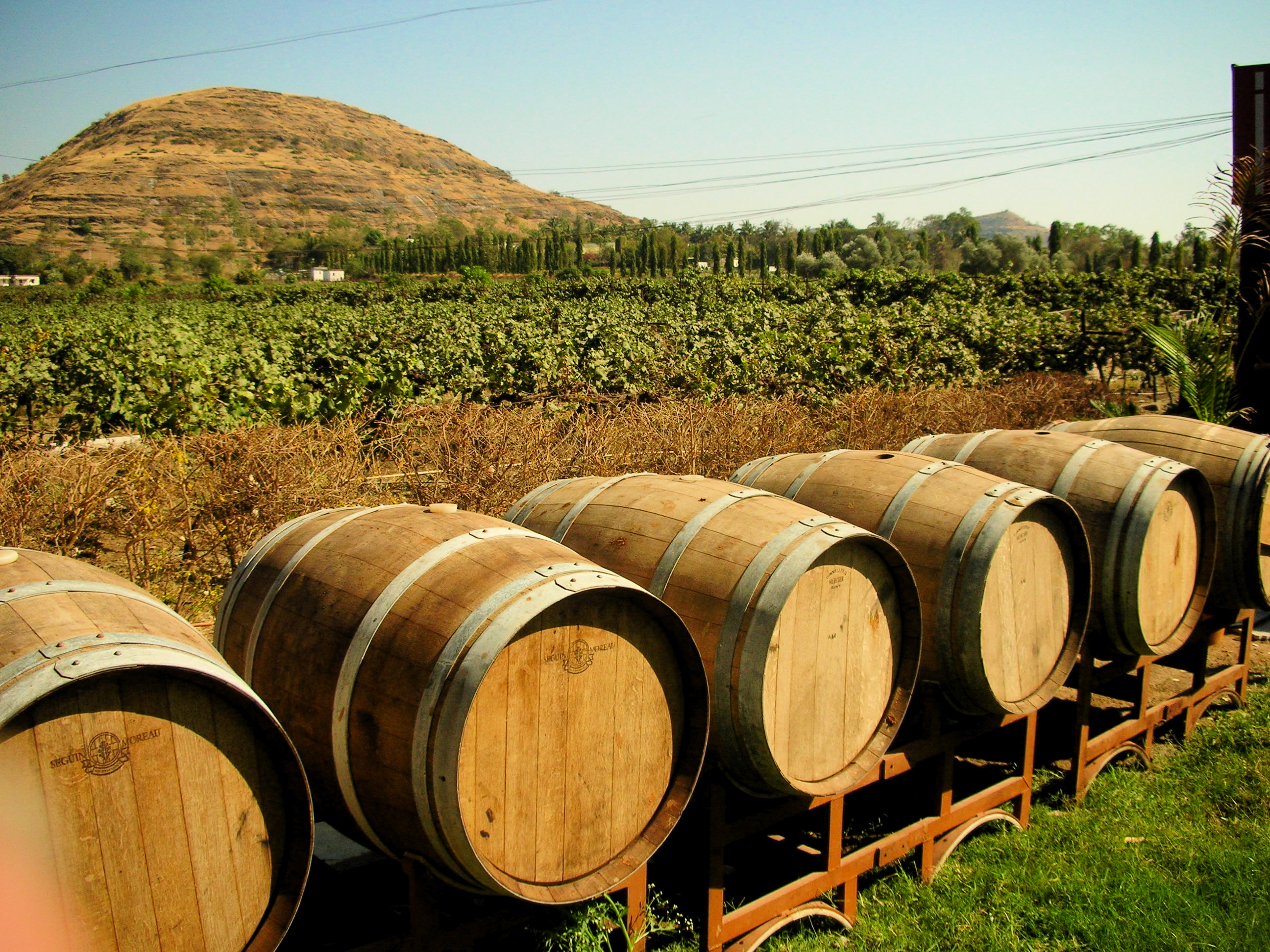
Vineyards of Chateau Indage in Pune

While a large portion of the Indian subcontinent is not ideal for viticulture, the large diversity of climate and geology does cover some areas with suitable terroir for winemaking to thrive. The summer growing season in India tends to be very hot and prone to monsoons. Many of India's wine regions also fall within the tropical climate band. Vineyards are then planted at higher altitudes along slopes and hillsides to benefit from cooler air and some protection from wind. The altitude of India's vineyards typically range from around 200 m in Karnataka, 300 m in Maharashtra, 800 m along the slopes of the Sahyadri to 1000 m in Kashmir. Summertime temperature can get as hot as 45 °C and wintertime lows can fall to 8 °C. During the peak growing season between June and August, rainfall averages 625-1,500 mm.

== Wine regions ==
Vineyards in India range from the more temperate climate of the northwestern state of Punjab down to the southern state of Tamil Nadu. Some of India's larger wine producing areas are located in Maharashtra, Karnataka near Bangalore and Telangana near Hyderabad. Within the Maharashtra region, vineyards are found on the Deccan Plateau and around Baramati, Nashik, Pune, Sangli and Solapur. The high heat and humidity of the far eastern half of the country limits viticultural activity.

== Viticulture and wine ==
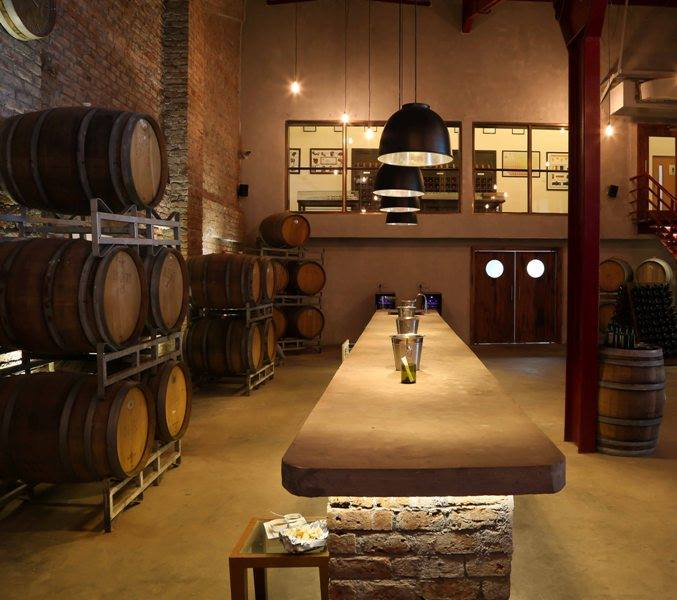
Tasting cellar at Sula Vineyards in Nasik

The heat and humidity of India's wine region dictate many of the viticultural choices that are made in the vineyards. Vines are often trained on bamboo and wire in a pergola to increase canopy cover and to get the grapes off the ground where they would be more prone to fungal diseases. The canopy protects the grapes against sunburn and rows are spaced wide to help with aeration between the vines. Irrigation is essential for the vines given the hot weather. The tropical conditions often promote high yields which requires frequent pruning throughout the year. Harvest normally takes place in February and is usually done by hand. In the very warm wine regions of Tamil Nadu, Karnataka, and Andhra Pradesh, grapevines can produce a crop twice a year.

Southern India is home to several indigenous table grape varieties that can also be used in wine production with Anabeshahi, Arkavati and Arkashyam being the most common. Popular non-native grapes include the Bangalore Blue (Isabella) and Gulabi (Black Muscat). The Turkish grape Sultana is the most widely planted grape in India, cover more than half of the 148,000 acres (60,000 ha) planted in the country. In addition to the imported French varieties that Chateau Indage planted, Sauvignon blanc, Zinfandel, Chenin blanc and Clairette Blanche have started to establish a presence in the Indian wine industry.

== See also ==
- Agriculture in India
- History of wine
- List of Indian beverages
- Sommelier India
- Winemaking
