= Sula Vineyards =

Winery and vineyard in Nashik, India

Coordinates: 20°00′24.8″N 73°41′18.5″E

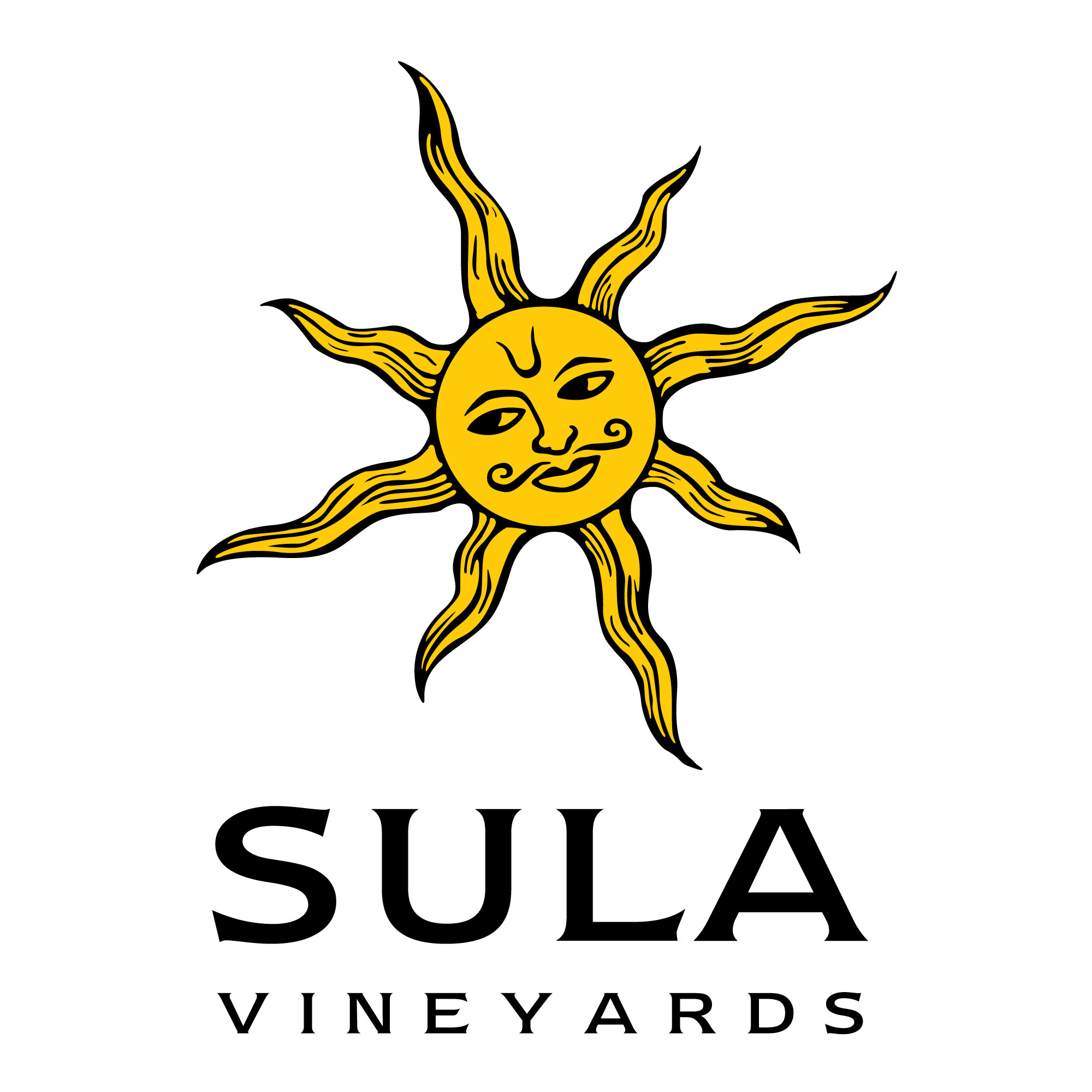

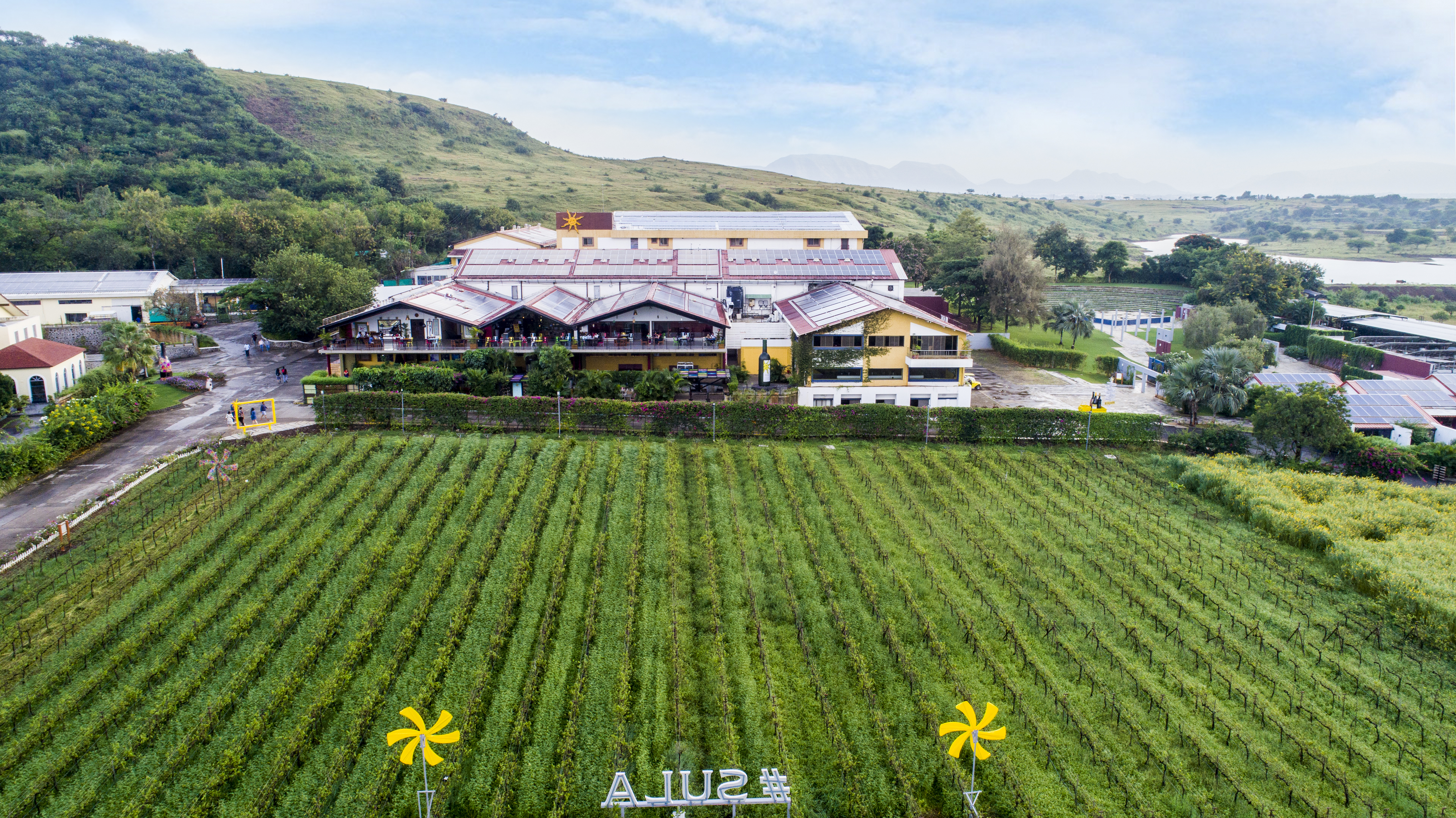
- Location: Nashik, Maharashtra, India
- Founded: 1999; 27 years ago
- First vintage: 1999
- Key people: Rajeev Samant (Founder & CEO); Kerry Damskey
- Varietals: Chenin blanc, Riesling, Sauvignon blanc, Viognier, Grenache, Zinfandel
- Other products: Grape seed oil, grape brandy
- Website: sulavineyards.com

Sula Vineyards Ltd
- Company type: Public
- Traded as: NSE: SULA; BSE: 543711
- Revenue: ▲₹608 crore (US$72 million) (FY24)
- Net income: ▲₹93 crore (US$11 million) (FY24)

Sula Vineyards is a winery and vineyard located in the Nashik region of western India, approximately 180 kilometres (110 mi) northeast of Mumbai. It was founded by Rajeev Samant in 1999. Sula has grown to be India's largest and most awarded wine brand. Sula introduced grape varietals such as Chenin blanc, Sauvignon blanc, Riesling and Zinfandel in India and is the leading player in the Indian wine industry.

== History ==
Sula Vineyards was founded by Rajeev Samant in the late 1990s. An alumnus of Stanford University, he worked at Oracle Corporation in California after his graduation. After quitting his corporate job, Samant established Sula upon his return to India.

Sula was named after Samant's mother, Sulabha. Samant steadily grew the company over the next few years by introducing newer grape varieties and expanding the company's offerings. Over the last few decades, the Nashik region has transformed and is often referred to as "India’s Napa Valley".

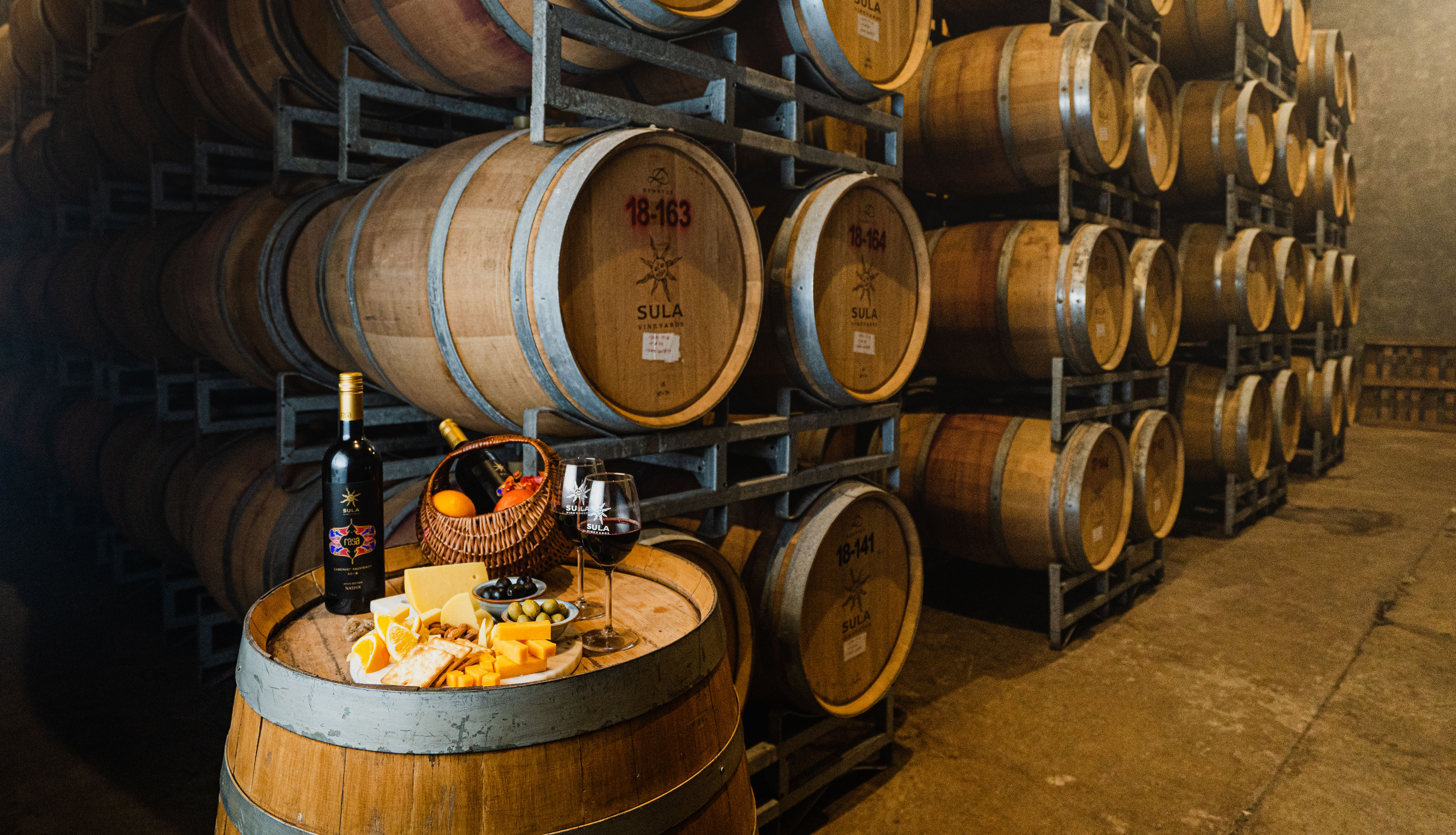
Wine barrels at Sula Vineyards

== Wine brands ==
=== Rasa ===
- Rasa Cabernet Sauvignon – This red wine is aged in French oak barrels for over a year and then matured in the bottle before release. It contains an ABV of 14%.
- Rasa Zinfandel – This rough red wine matures for around 3–4 months in American Oak barrels and contains an ABV of 14%.

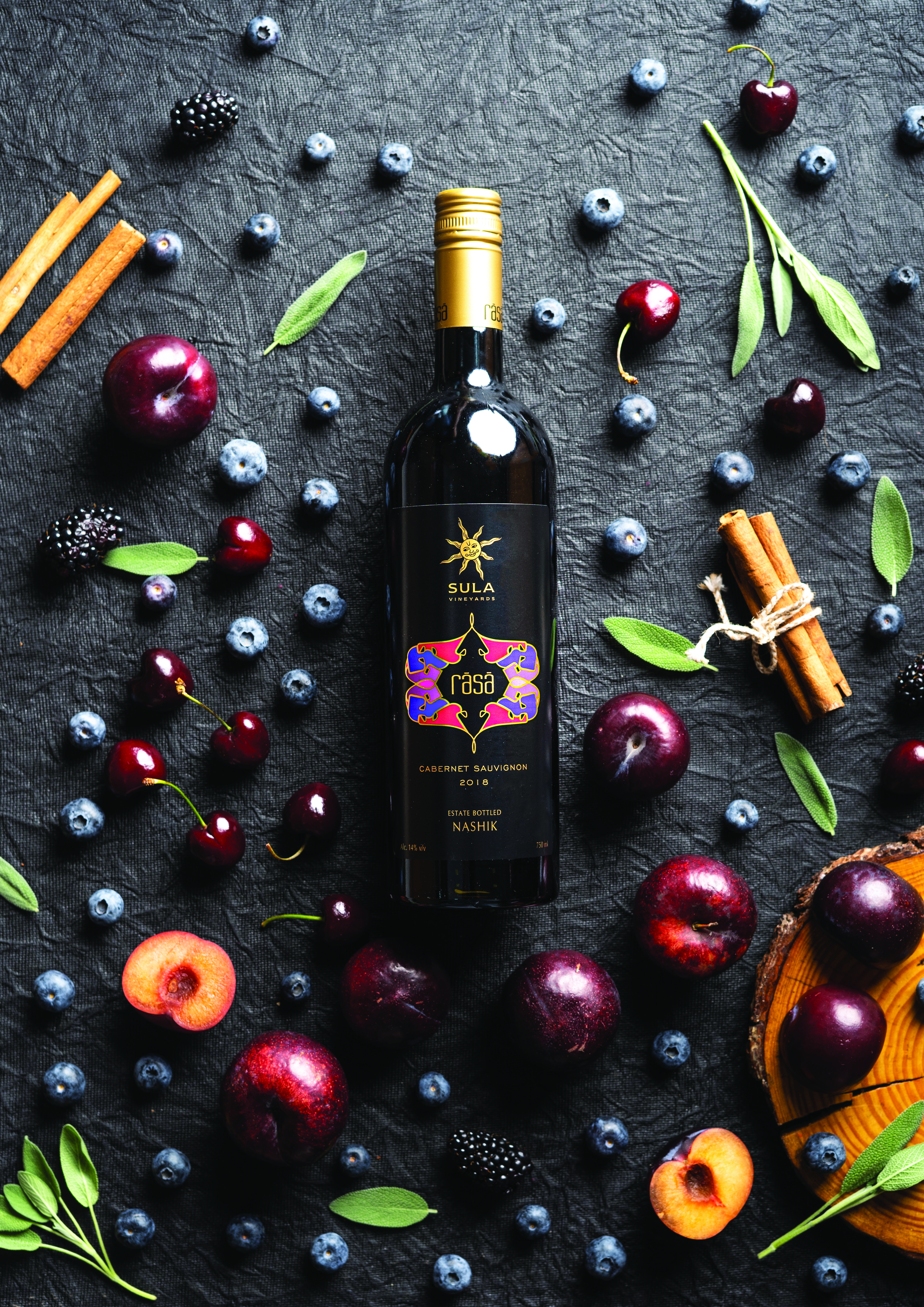
RASA Cabernet Sauvignon

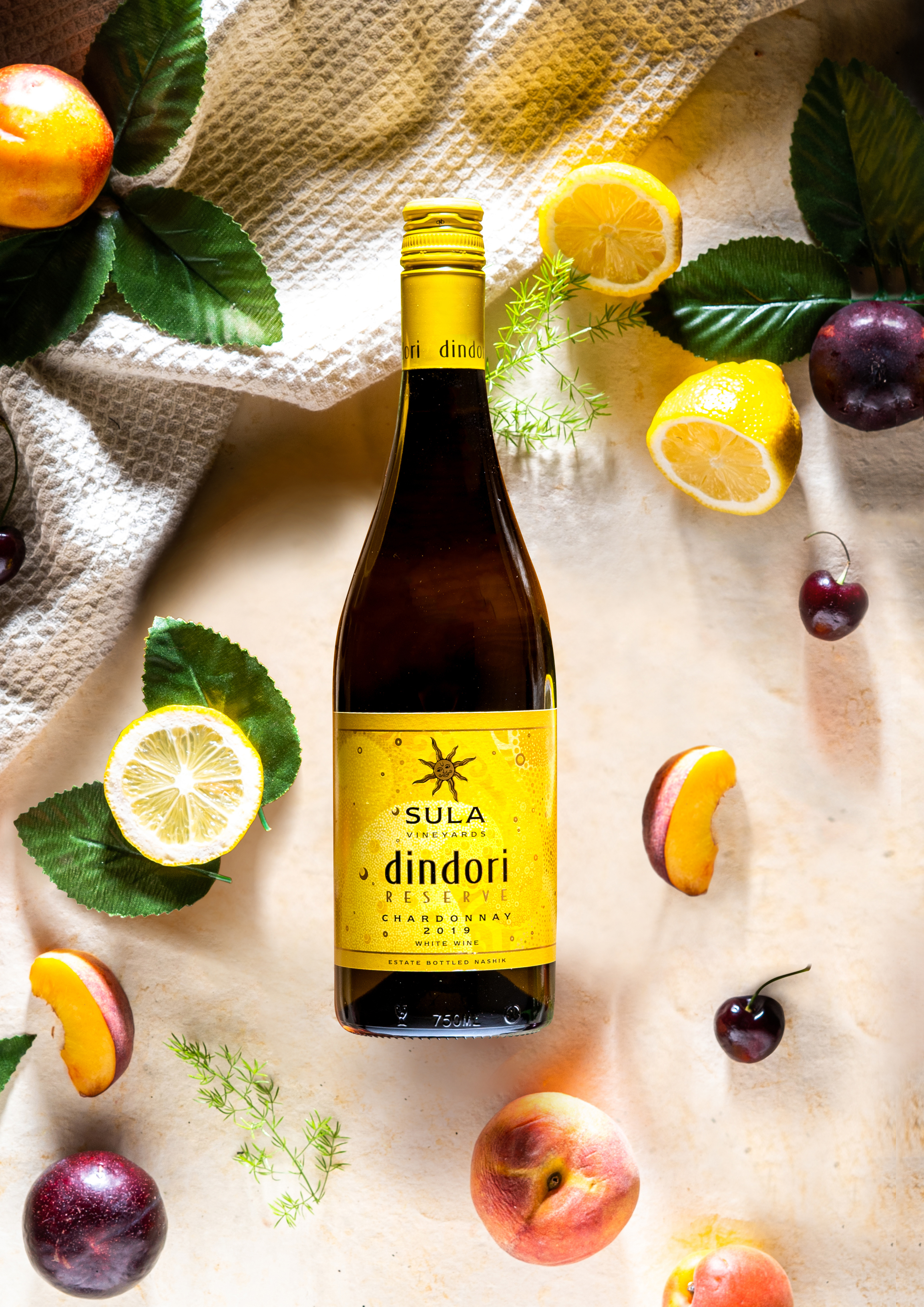
Dindori Reserve Chardonnay

=== Dindori ===
Sula's Dindori Reserve highlights the winemakers and their endeavours, using their winemaking skills and tools.

The Dindori collection by Sula includes three variants:

- Dindori Reserve Viognier – This dry white wine has a rich fruity profile and an ABV of 12.5%.
- Dindori Reserve Chardonnay – This medium-bodied dry white wine is partly aged in French Oak barrels and contains an ABV of 13%.
- Dindori Reserve Shiraz – This full-bodied, dry red wine is barrel-aged in American oak for 10–12 months and contains an ABV of 14%. It is the first ever Indian wine to feature in the Top 100 Wines list by Wine Enthusiast.

=== The Source ===
- The Source Grenache Rosé – This rosé wine contains an ABV of 12.5%.
- The Source Sauvignon Blanc Reserve – This medium-bodied dry white wine is partly aged in French Oak barrels and contains an ABV of 12.5%.
- The Source Cabernet Sauvignon – A well-balanced wine with notes of black fruits. It has an ABV of 13.5%.

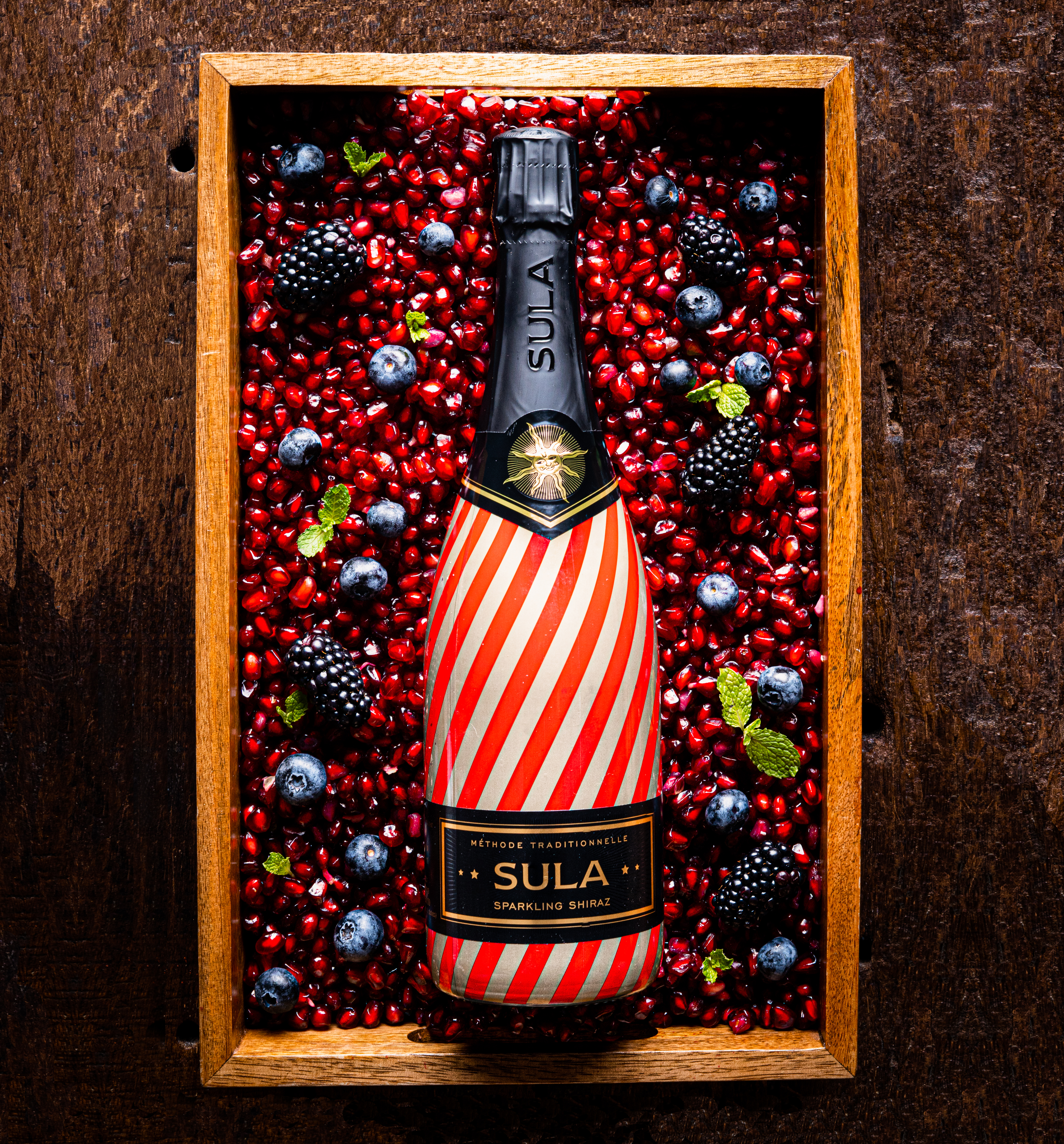
Sula Sparkling Shiraz

=== Sula Classics ===
Sula's wine offering includes over 30 variants:

- Sula Brut – matured for 2–4 months. It contains an ABV of 12%.
- Sula Brut Tropicale – Sula's first Blanc de Noirs is a blend of 60% Chenin Blanc and 40% includes Shiraz and Riesling. It is bottle-aged for 18 months and contains an ABV of 12%.
- Sula Sparkling Shiraz – Sula Sparkling Shiraz is India's first and only sparkling shiraz wine. Matured for 4–5 months in oak barrels, this wine contains an ABV of 13.5%.
- Sula Zinfandel Rosé – India's first ever Zinfandel, this wine contains an ABV of 11.5%.
- Sula Riesling – This fruity white wine is India's first Riesling and contains an ABV of 11%.
- Sula Sauvignon Blanc – India's first ever Sauvignon Blanc, this unbaked white wine contains an ABV of 12.5%.
- Sula Chenin Blanc – This semi-dry white wine is India's first ever Chenin Blanc as well as the country's best-selling white wine. It contains an ABV of 12%.
- Sula Chenin Blanc Reserve – The limited edition Chenin Blanc Reserve is hand-picked from Sula's Dindori estate vineyards. Partially aged in French oak barrels, it contains an ABV of 12.5%.
- Sula Cabernet Shiraz – This medium-bodied red wine is India's best-selling red wine. It contains an ABV of 13.5%.
- Sula Zinfandel – This medium-bodied red wine contains an ABV of 13.5%.
- Sula Late Harvest Chenin Blanc – This dessert wine by Sula is India's first ever late harvest Chenin Blanc and contains an ABV of 13.5%.
- Sula Seco Rosé – This medium-dry rosé sparkling wine contains an ABV of 10.5%.
- Sula Seco – Sula Seco Rose is a medium dry rosé sparkling wine with an ABV of 10.5%.
- Sula Satori Tempranillo – "Satori" is a Zen term meaning "sudden enlightenment". This red wine variant is a medium-bodied blend of Tempranillo, Malbec and Merlot. It contains an ABV of 13%.
- Sula Brut Crémant De Nashik – a sparkling wine with an ABV of 12%.

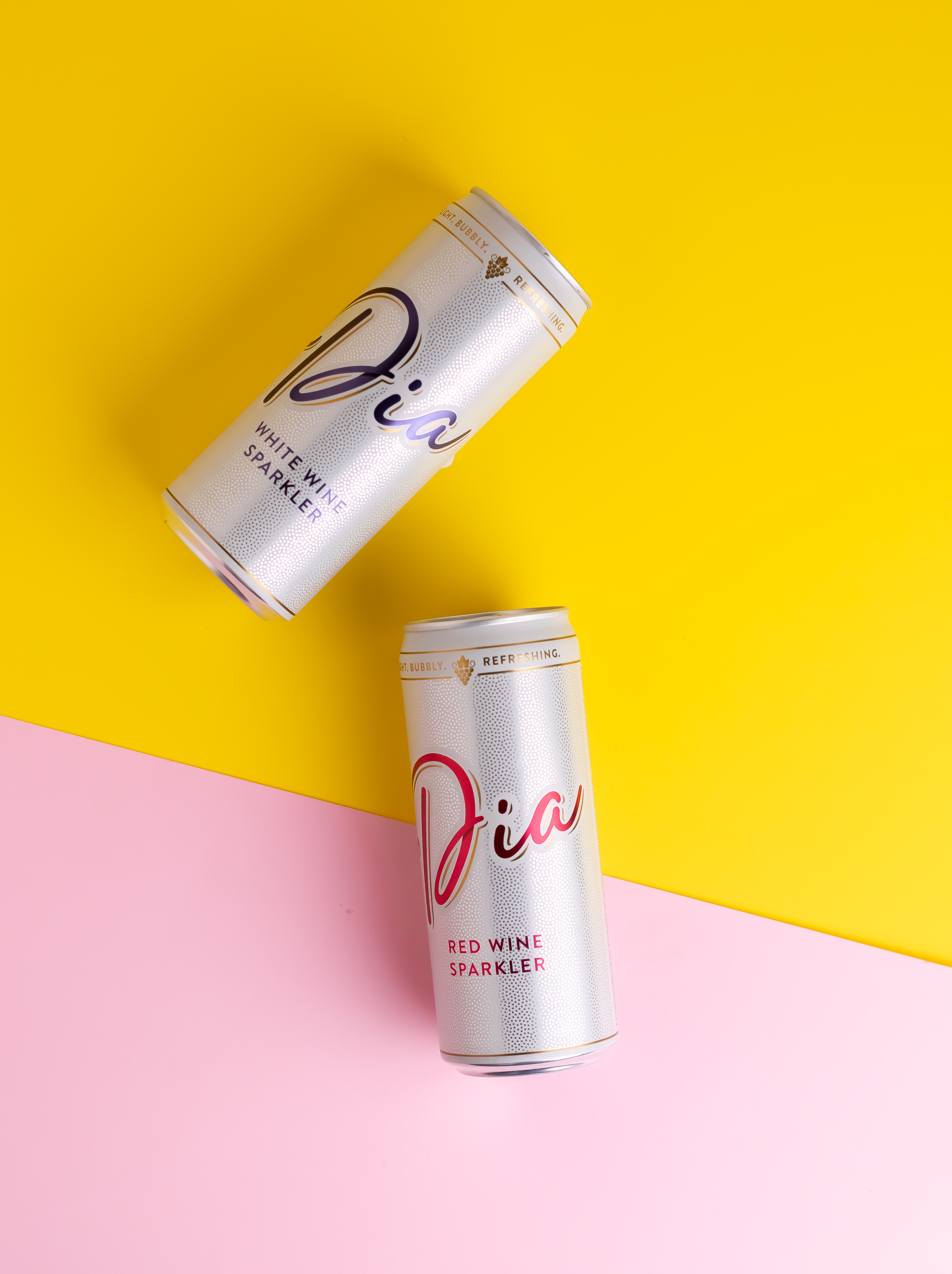
Dia Sparkling Red & White Wine Sparkler

=== Dia ===
India's first wine in a can, Dia, was launched in 2019 as a line of wine sparklers. The wine is currently available in Goa and Maharashtra.

=== Kadu ===
The first Indian wine for a cause: Sula has partnered with Sanctuary Nature Foundation, a non-profit organisation designed to empower and support grassroots conservationists across India.

The Kadu collection by Sula includes four variants:

- Kadu Chenin Blanc – This refreshing white wine contains an ABV of 12%.
- Kadu Cabernet Shiraz – This medium-bodied red wine contains an ABV of 13%.
- Kadu Shiraz Rosé – This fruity wine contains an ABV of 12%
- Kadu Sauvignon Blanc – This aromatic white wine contains an ABV of 12%

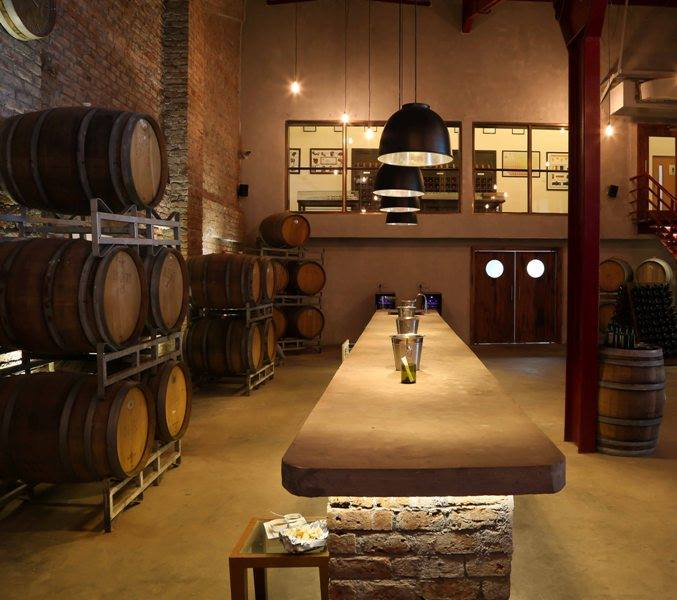
Sula's Tasting Cellar at Nashik

Sula's tasting cellar and bottle display at Nashik

=== Sula Selections ===
Sula also imports and distributes leading international wines and spirits such as Le Grand Noir, Torres, Trapiche, Hardy's, Bouchard Aîné et Fils, Cap Royal, Cono Sur, Gruppo Italiano Vini, Beluga Vodka, Asahi and many more.

Sula exports many of its wines to over 30 countries and includes countries like Singapore, Australia, Italy, France to name a few.

== Sustainability ==
Over 50% of all of Sula's energy needs are met by the solar panels installed at the winery in Nashik. The packaging used for Sula's products are 99% recyclable, and the company has planted over 30,000 trees around Nashik in the last few years.

== Milestones ==
Sula is considered a pioneer in India winemaking and has achieved many milestones in the last few decades. These are the milestones achieved:

- Sula Vineyards was the first company to set up a winery in Nashik in 1999. The company has been instrumental in Nashik earning a reputation of becoming the "Wine Capital of India".
- Sula pioneered many classic grape varieties including Sauvignon Blanc and Chenin Blanc in 2000, Zinfandel in 2003, and Riesling in 2008.
- Launched India's first Grenache Rosé.
- Launched India's first and only sparkling Shiraz.
- Producer of India's best-selling red wine.
- Sula Sommeliers conducted nearly 1300 tastings for consumers and institutions in 2020
- Sula is also one of the few authorised WSET (Wine & Spirit Education Trust) course providers in India. The Wine & Spirit Education Trust often referred to as WSET, is a global organisation that arranges courses and exams in the field of wine and spirits.
- Launched India's first "Wildlife Wine", Kadu in four varieties available in Karnataka, Maharashtra, and Goa.
- Launched India's first wine in a can – Dia, in two variants of red and white wine.
- Sula is the first national wine brand to be listed with TASMAC – the Tamil Nadu State Marketing Corporation.
- Sula's wines are served on India's national carrier, Air India.
- Sula is the first Indian wine to be listed by Marks & Spencer UK in the year 2013.

== Wine tourism ==
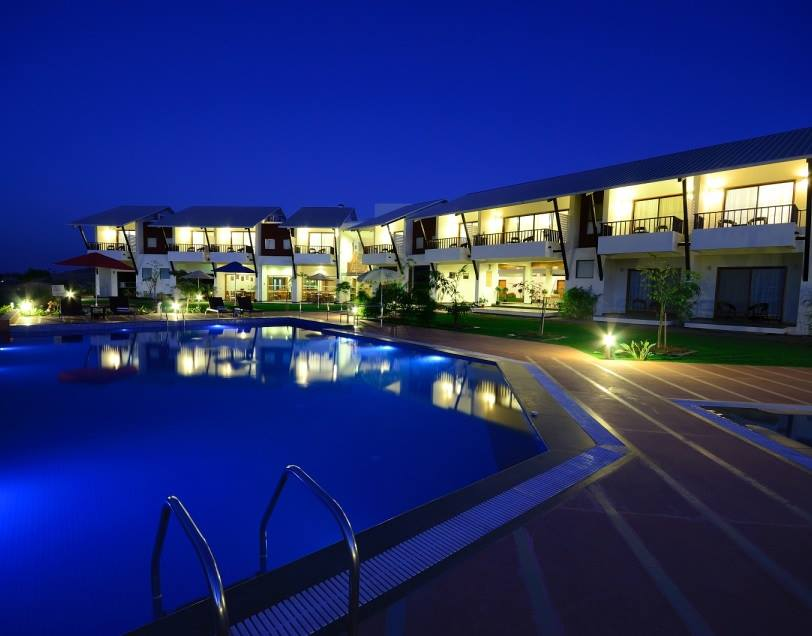
Beyond By Sula resort

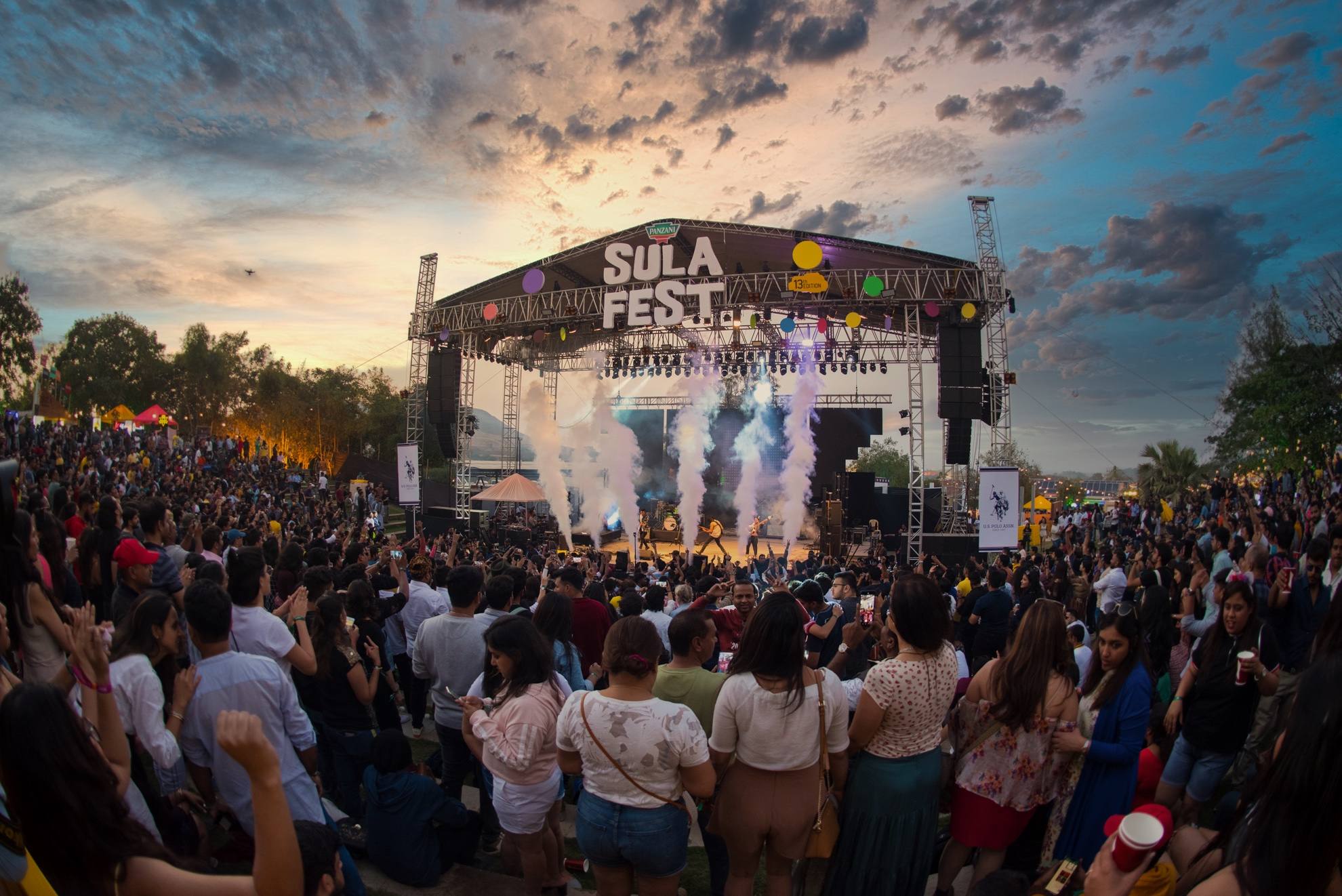
SulaFest in February 2020

Sula also owns and operates two wine resorts called "The Source at Sula" and "Beyond by Sula" located near its plant in Nashik. It has a tasting room at its winery in Nashik and one at "Domaine Sula" vineyard in Karnataka.

Starting from 2008, Sula conducted an annual wine-and-music festival called SulaFest at its vineyard in Nashik. SulaFest was discontinued after 13 editions, in the aftermath of the COVID-19 pandemic.
