= Britton Caillouette =

American filmmaker and producer

- Born: Britton Caillouette; California
- Education: Stanford University
- Occupations: Director, producer, editor
- Years active: 2006–present
- Website: www.brittoncaillouette.com

Britton Caillouette, is an American filmmaker and musician. He is most notable as the director of critically acclaimed films Sliding Liberia and Blue Heart.

== Personal life ==
He grew up in Orange County, Southern California and currently lives on a historic farm in Northern California. He studied history at the Center for the North American West at Stanford University. When he was 16 years old, he suffered with cancer. Therefore, he had to amputated a leg in the process.

== Career ==
In 2007, he directed his first documentary in Liberia, West Africa: Sliding Liberia, while an undergraduate at Stanford. In 2013, he joined Farm League. Later he worked on the film Unbroken Grounds in 2016. In 2018, he released his second feature documentary, Blue Heart with the production company 'Patagonia'. The film deals about the fight to save the last wild rivers in Europe from development. In 2019, he made the documentary short Wax & Gold with the collaboration of Stumptown Coffee Roasters and Farm League. The film documents their travels to Ethiopia and its rich history and culture.

== Filmography ==
Year	Film	Role	Genre	Ref.
2007	Sliding Liberia	Director	Short film	
2016	Unbroken Ground	Additional Photography	Short film	
2018	Blue Heart	Director, editor	Documentary	
2019	Wax & Gold	Director	Documentary short	
