= Council of Women World Leaders =

Network of current and former state leaders founded in 1996

- Formation: 1996
- Founders: Vigdís Finnbogadóttir; Mary Robinson; Laura Liswood
- Type: NGO, network
- Purpose: To mobilize the highest-level women leaders on issues of critical importance to women
- Headquarters: United Nations Foundation, Washington, D.C.
- Members: 96 current and former women presidents and prime ministers
- Secretary General: Laura Liswood
- Council Chair: Myriam Spiteri Debono
- Affiliations: United Nations Foundation
- Website: councilwomenworldleaders.org

The Council of Women World Leaders is a network organization composed of 96 current and former female presidents and prime ministers. Established in 1996, its mission is to promote good governance, enhance the experience of democracy, and increase the visibility of women who lead at the highest levels. It is the only organization in the world dedicated solely to women heads of state and government.

Through its networks, strategic programs, and partnerships, the Council promotes gender equality and increases the visibility of women leading their countries. By drawing on the leadership and expertise of its members, the Council works to support the full participation and representation of women at the highest levels of political leadership — today and for future generations.

The Council's first summit was held April 29–30, 1998, at the John F. Kennedy School of Government at Harvard University.

== Leadership ==
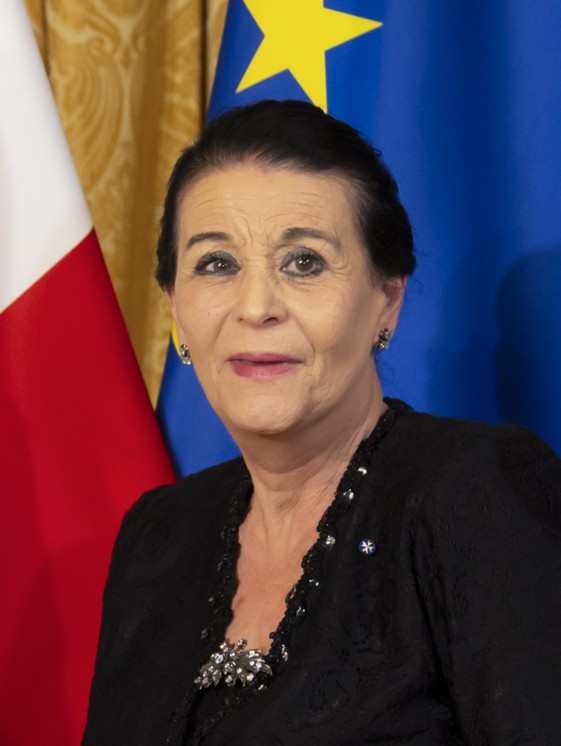
Myriam Spiteri Debono
Council Chair
(2024–present)
President of Malta
(2024–present)

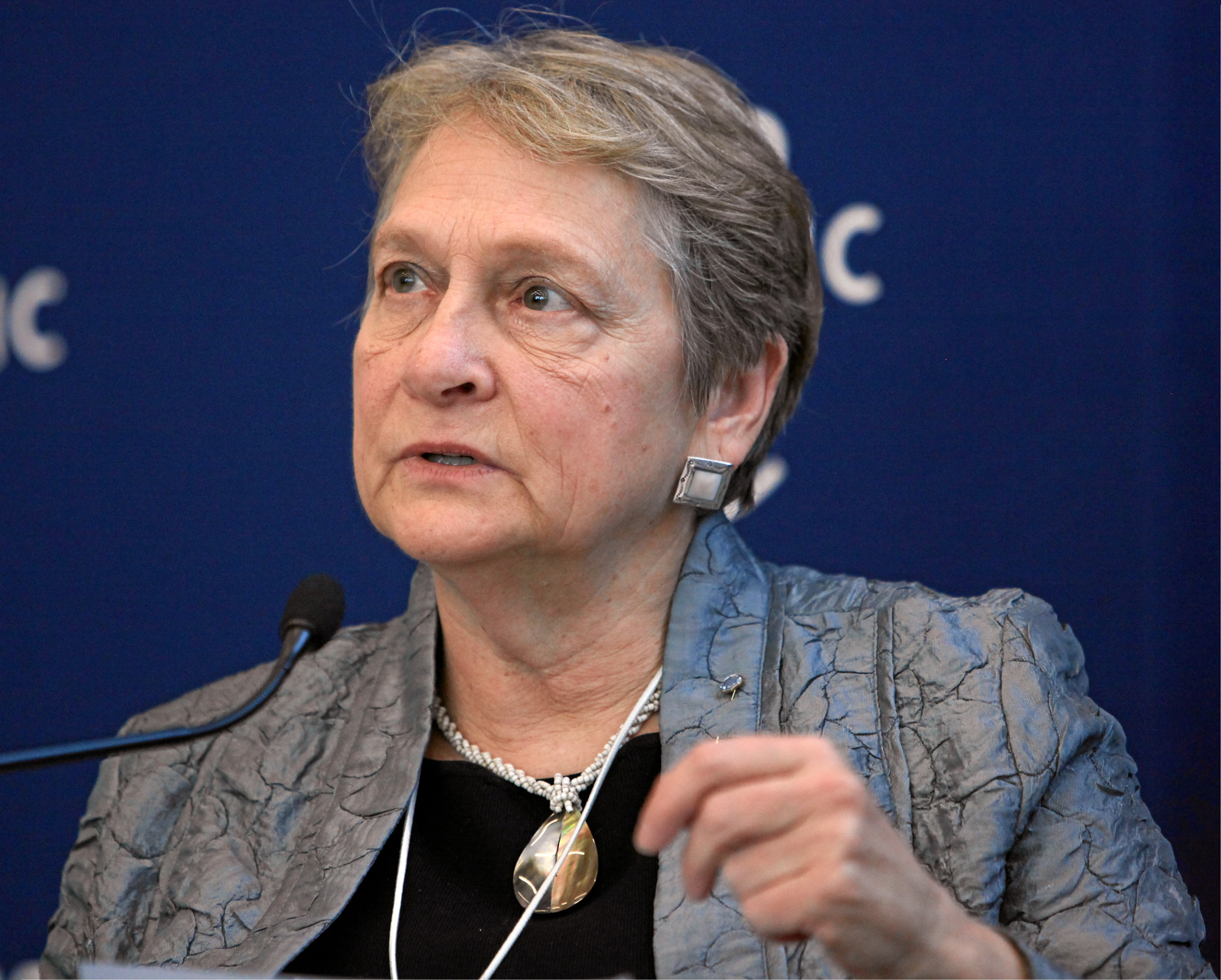
(United States) Laura Liswood
Secretary General
(1996–present)

== Chair emeritae ==
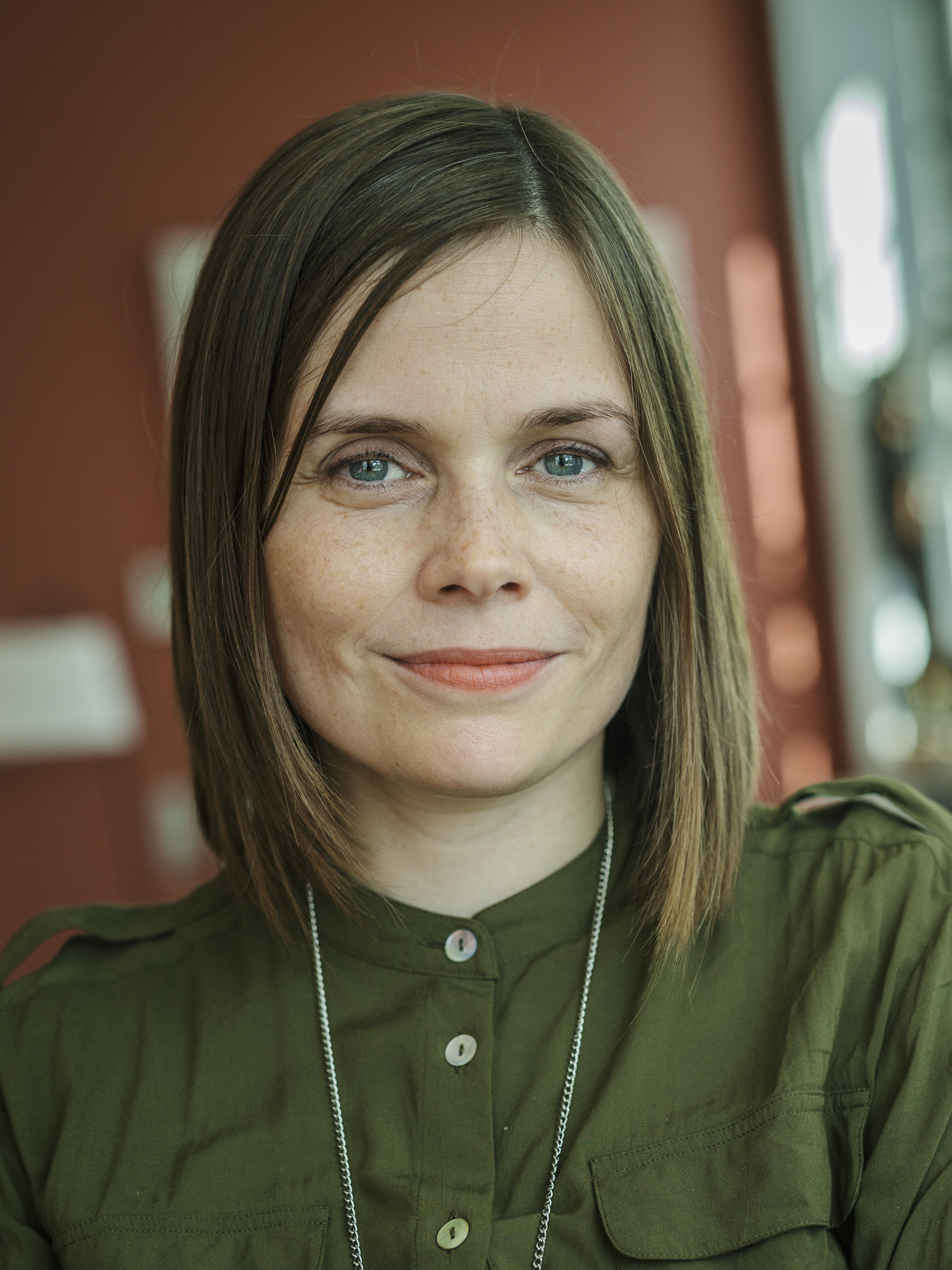
Katrín Jakobsdóttir
Council Chair
(2020–2024)
Prime Minister of Iceland
(2017–2024)

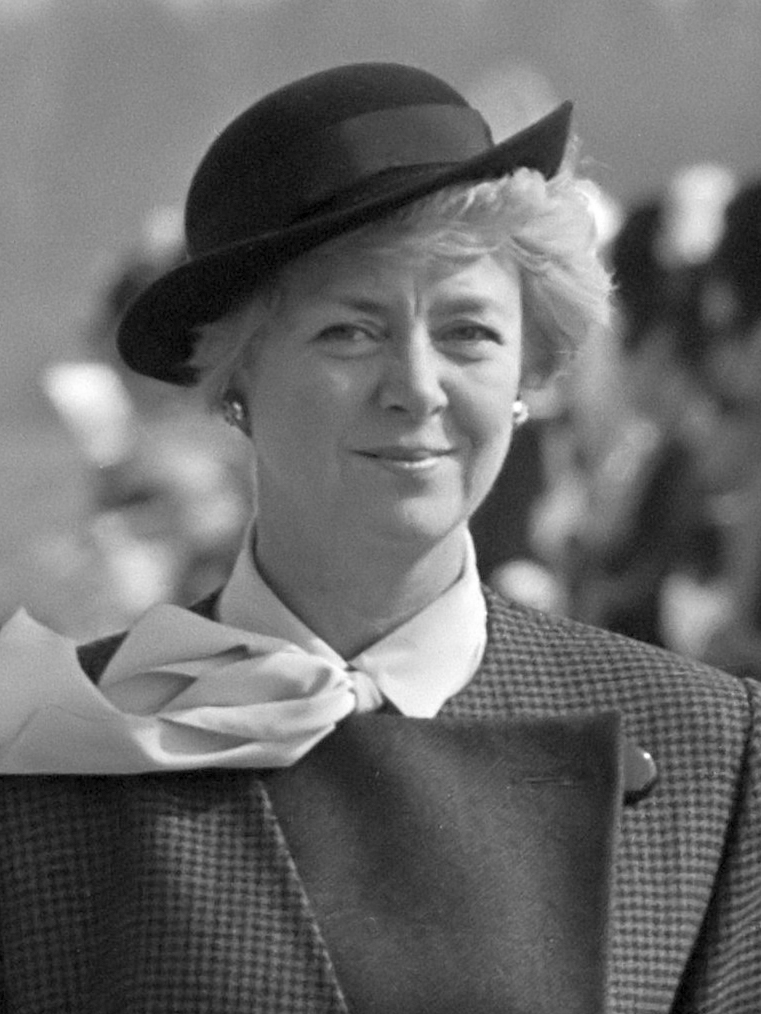
Vigdís Finnbogadóttir
Council Chair
(1996–1999)
President of Iceland
(1980–1996)

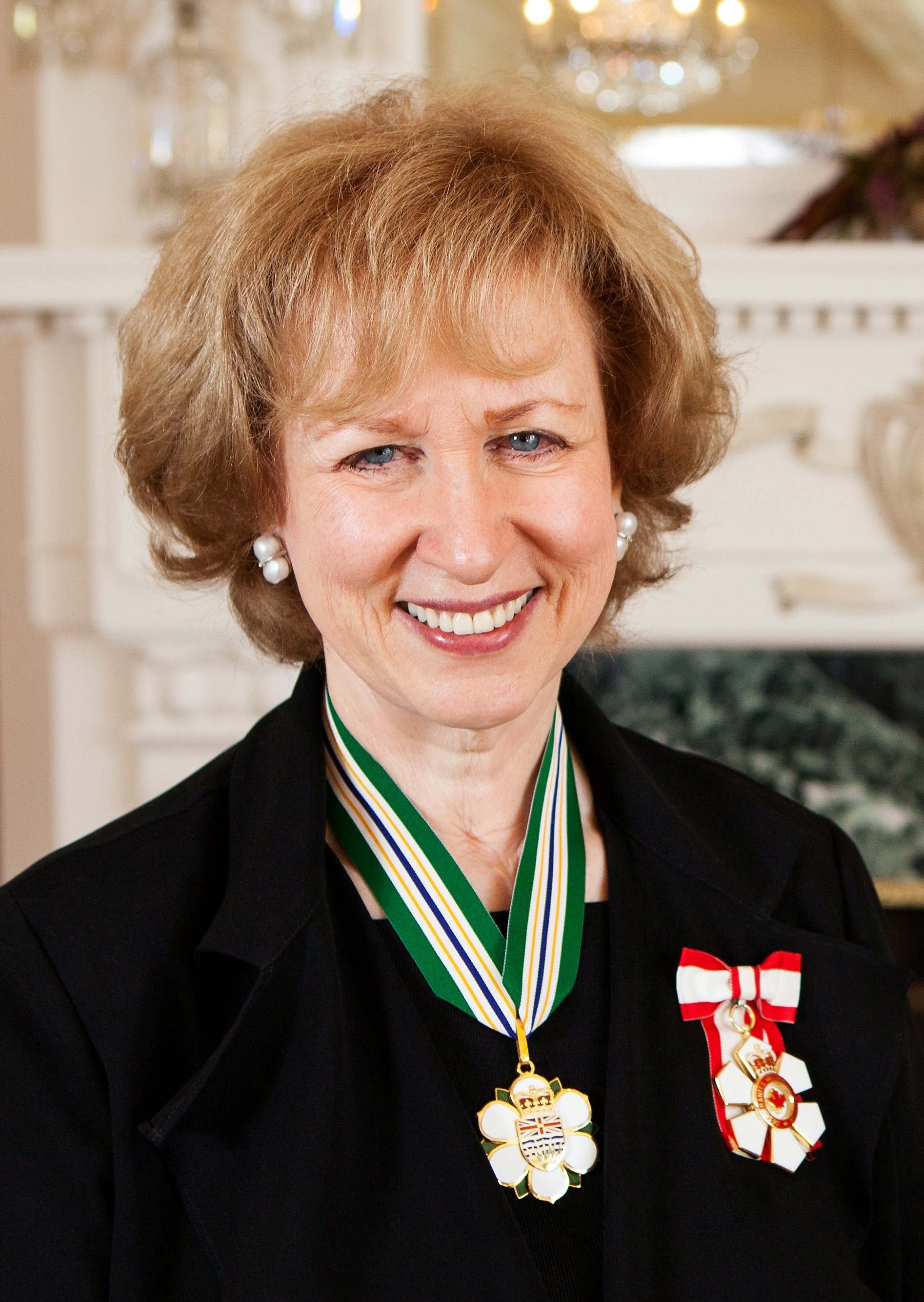
Kim Campbell
Council Chair
(1999–2003)
Prime Minister of Canada
(1993)

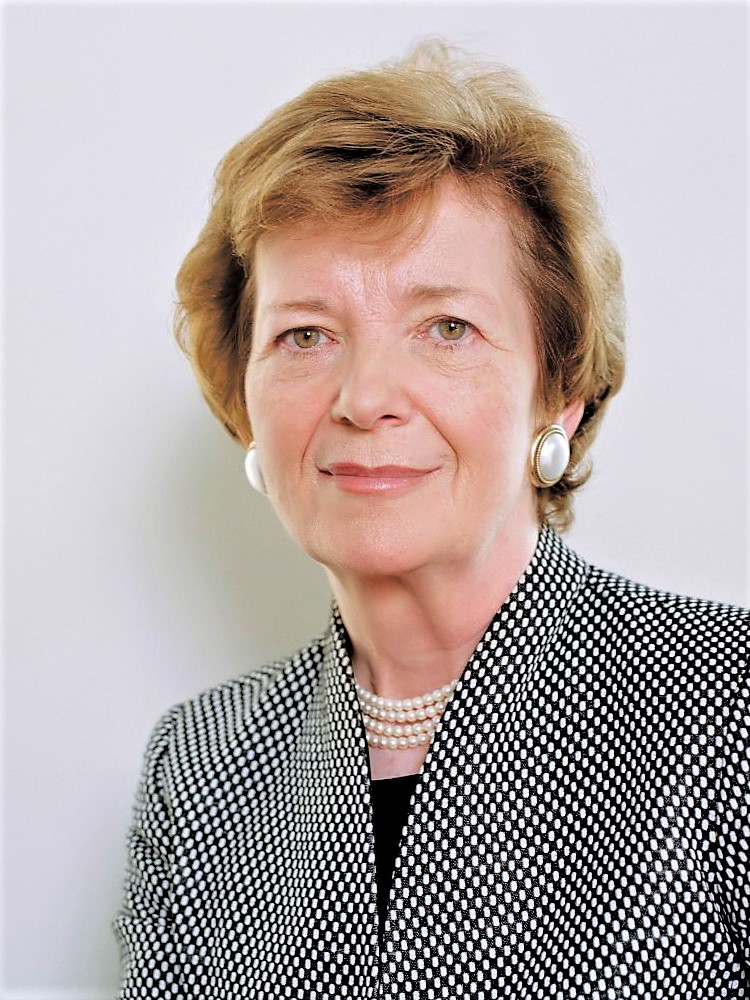
(Republic of Ireland) Mary Robinson
Council Chair
(2003–2009)
President of Ireland
(1990–1997)

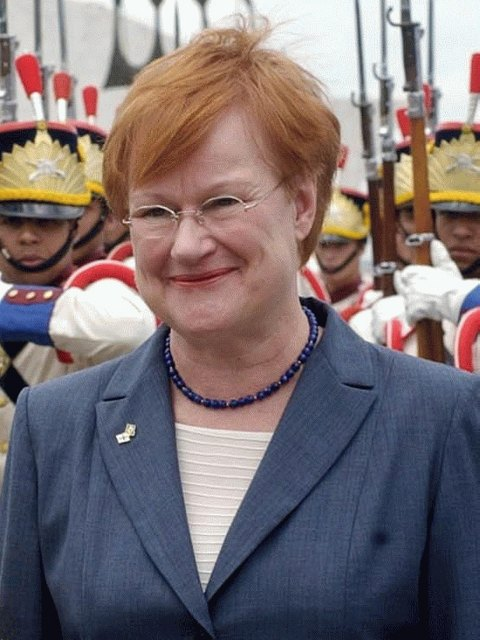
Tarja Halonen
Council Chair
(2009–2014)
President of Finland
(2000–2012)

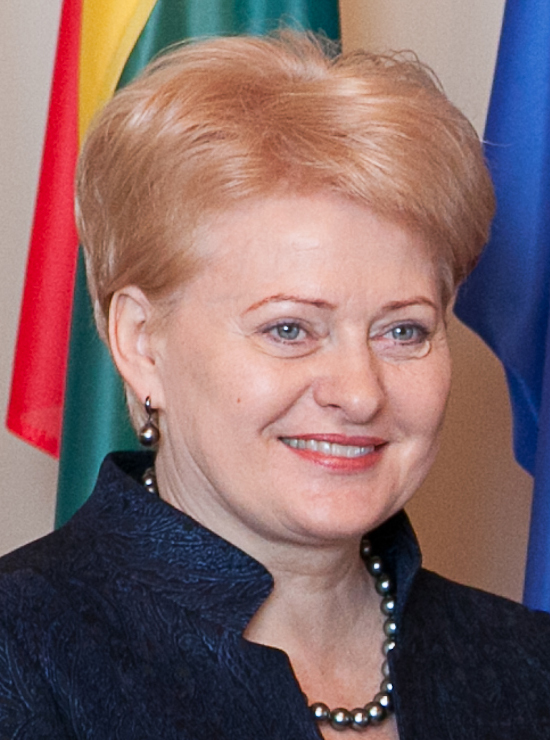
Dalia Grybauskaitė
Council Chair
(2014–2019)
President of Lithuania
(2009–2019)

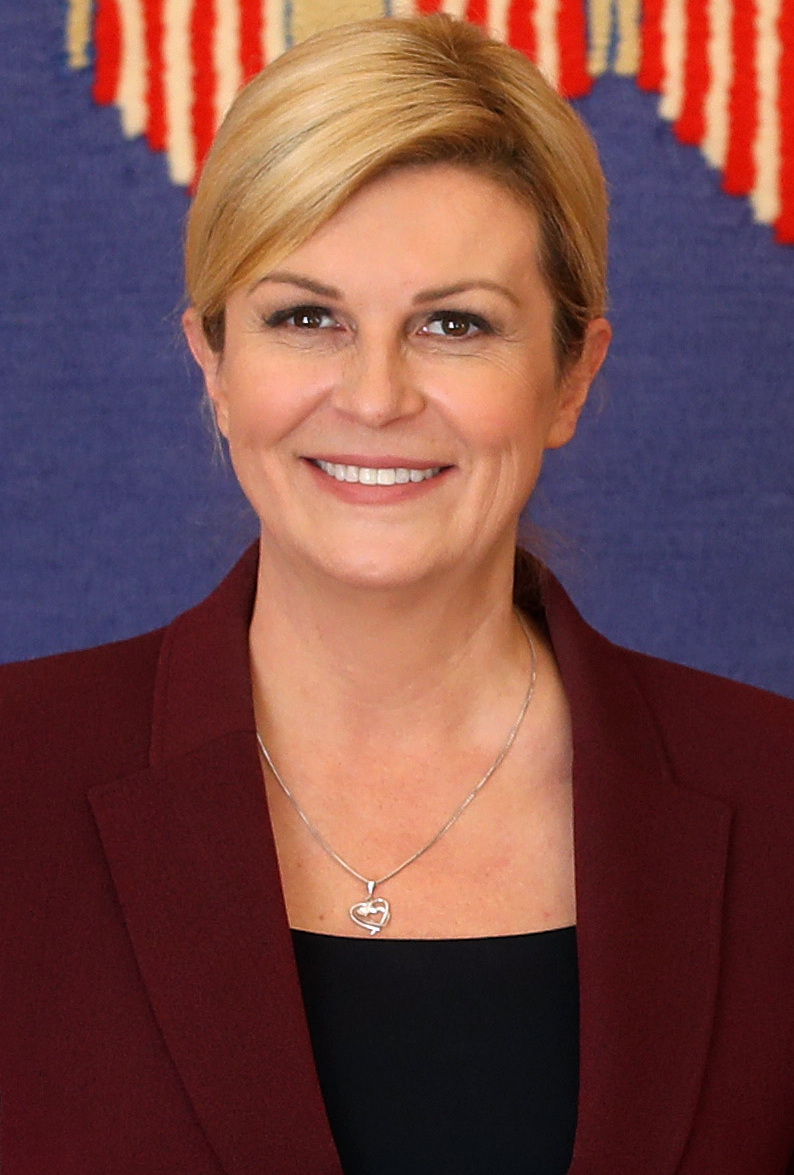
Kolinda Grabar-Kitarović
Council Chair
(2019–2020)
President of Croatia
(2015–2020)

== Members ==
=== Members currently serving as heads of state or government ===
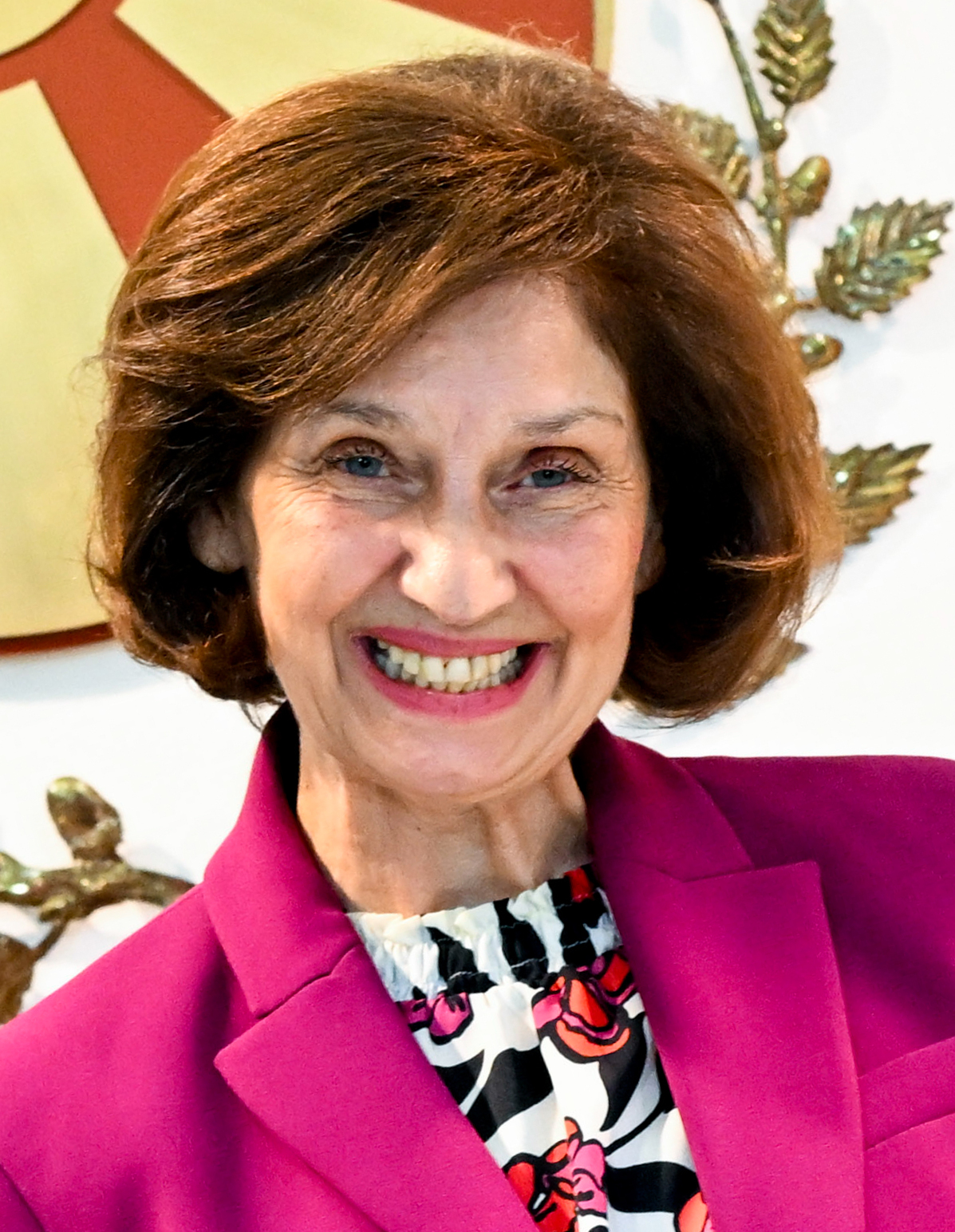
Gordana Siljanovska-Davkova
President of North Macedonia
(2024–present)

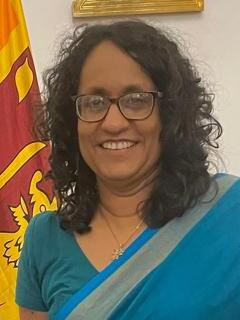
Harini Amarasuriya
Prime Minister of Sri Lanka
(2024–present)

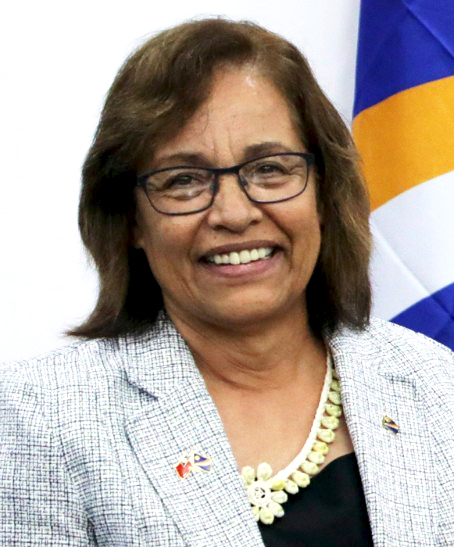
Hilda Heine
President of the Marshall Islands
(2016–2020, 2024–present)

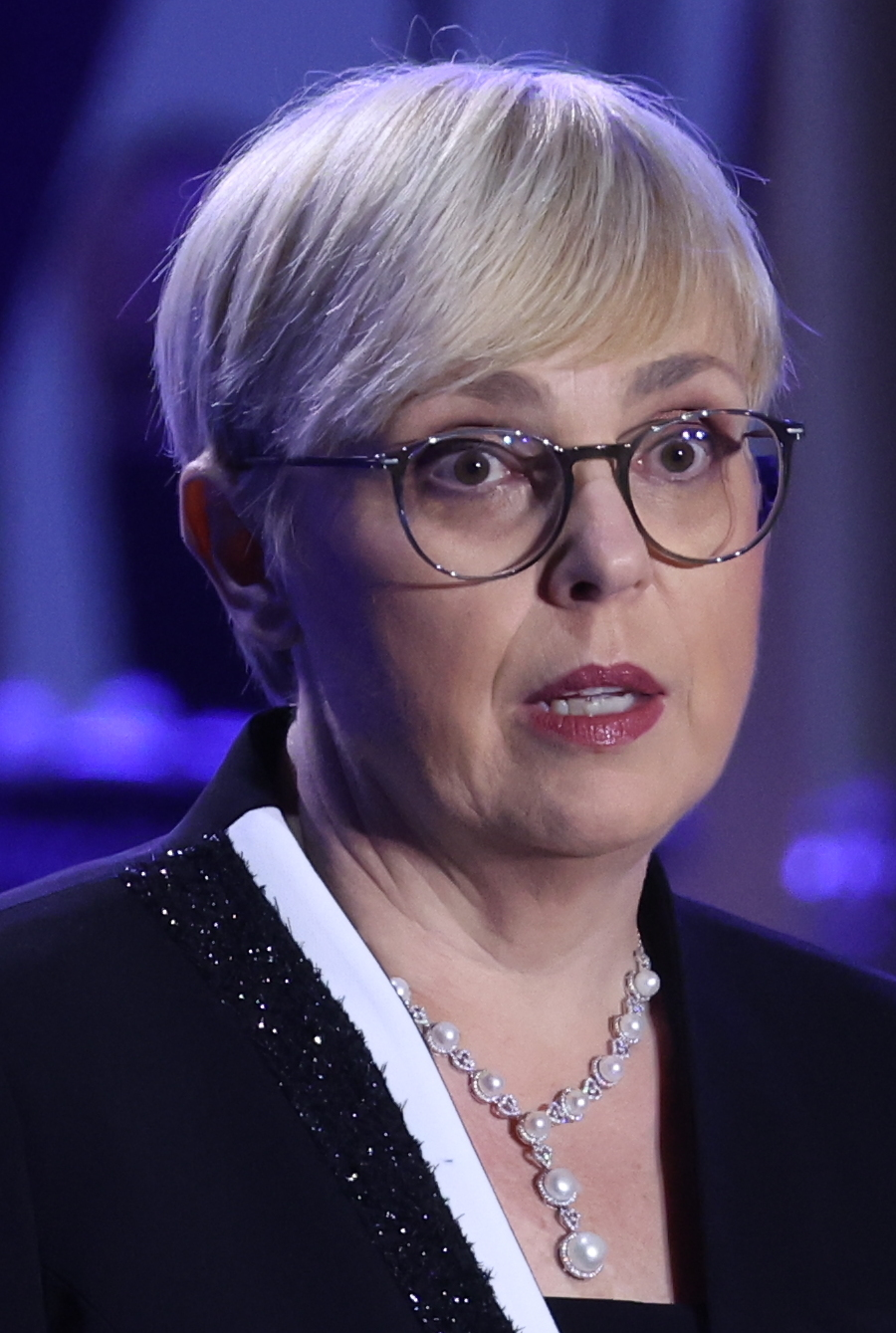
Nataša Pirc Musar
President of Slovenia
(2022–present)

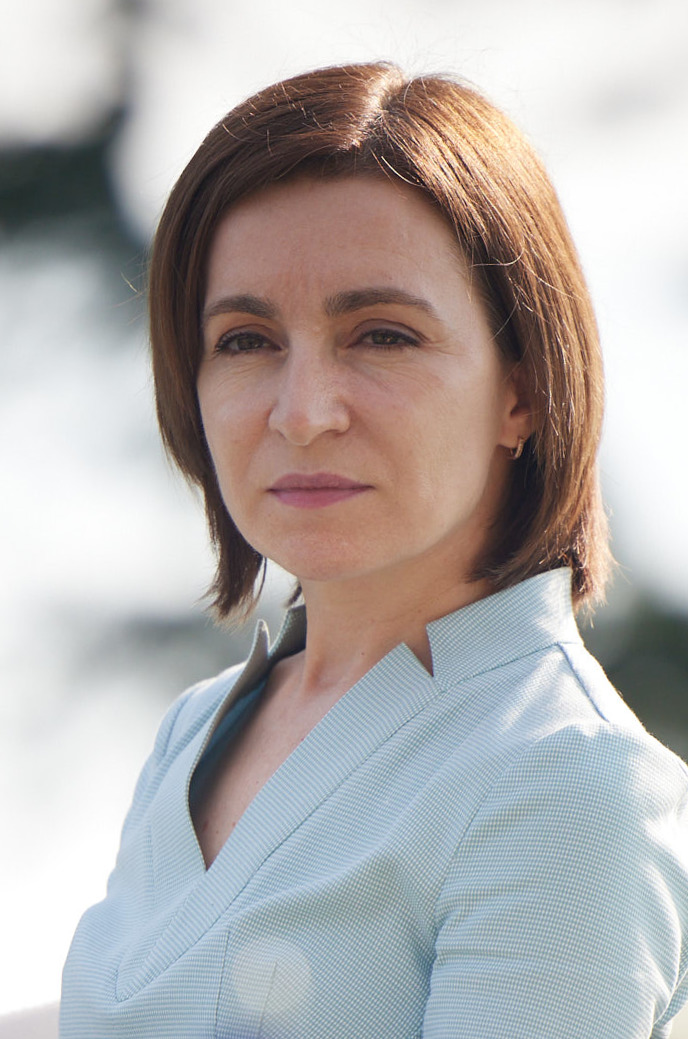
Maia Sandu
President of Moldova
(2020–present)

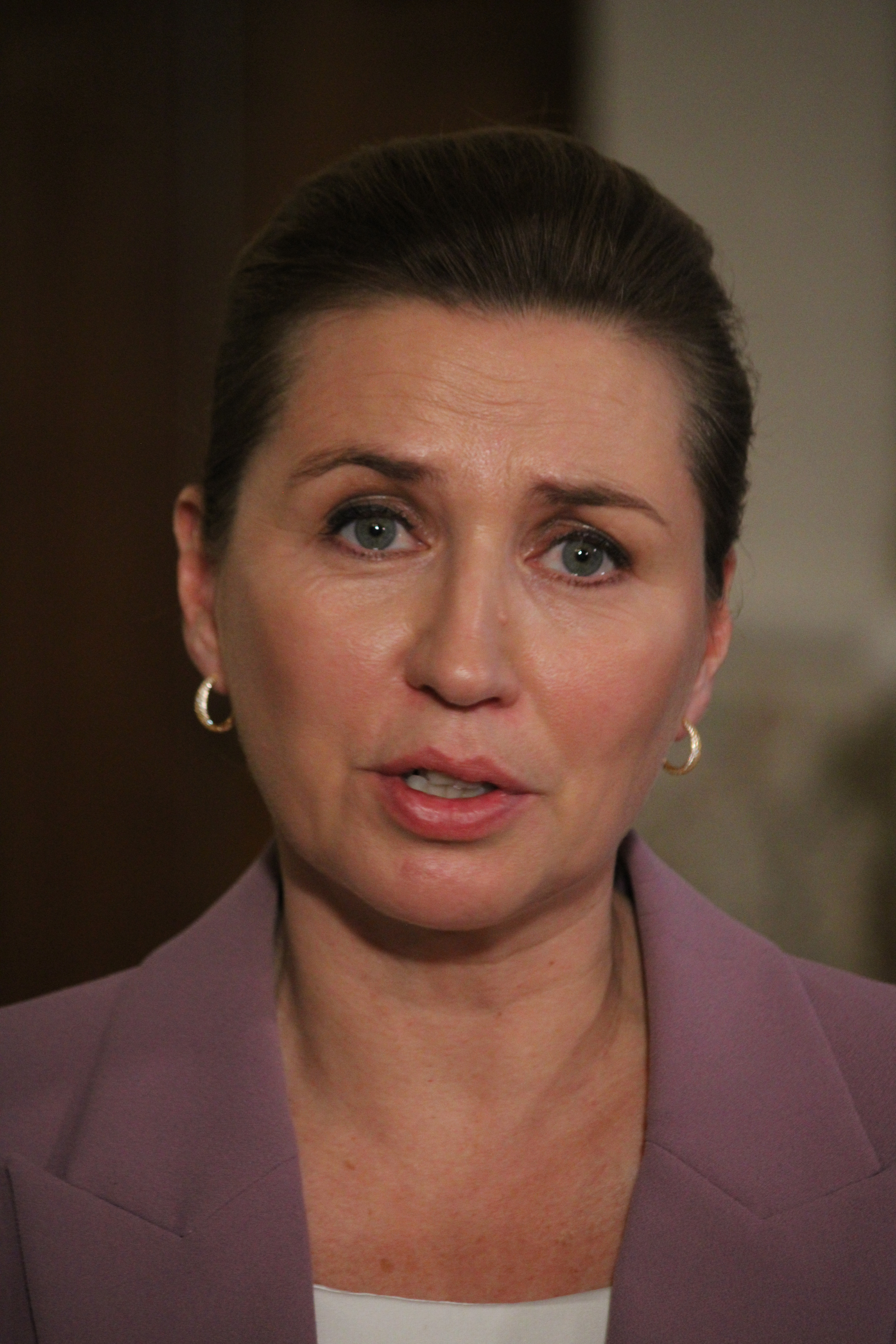
Mette Frederiksen
Prime Minister of Denmark
(2019–present)

=== Members who previously served as heads of state or government ===
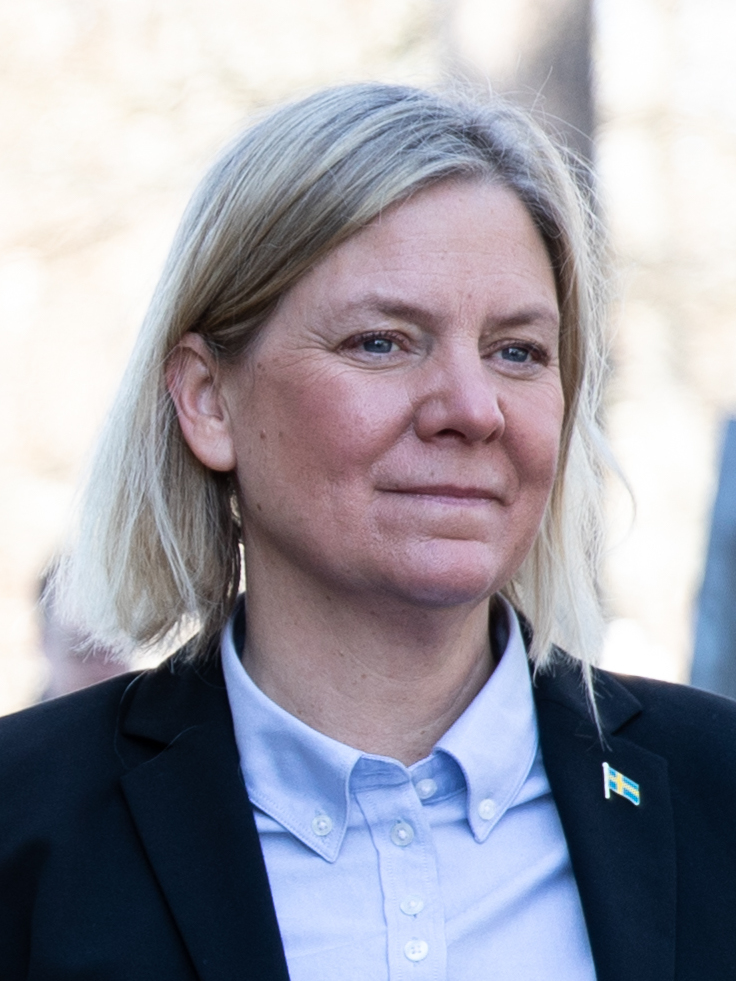
Magdalena Andersson
Prime Minister of Sweden
(2021–2022)

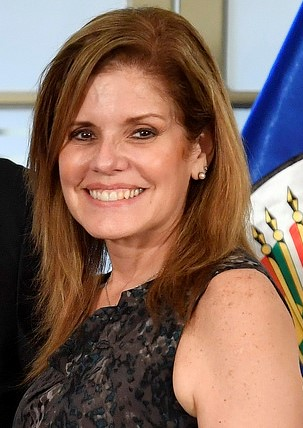
Mercedes Aráoz
Prime Minister of Peru
(2017–2018)

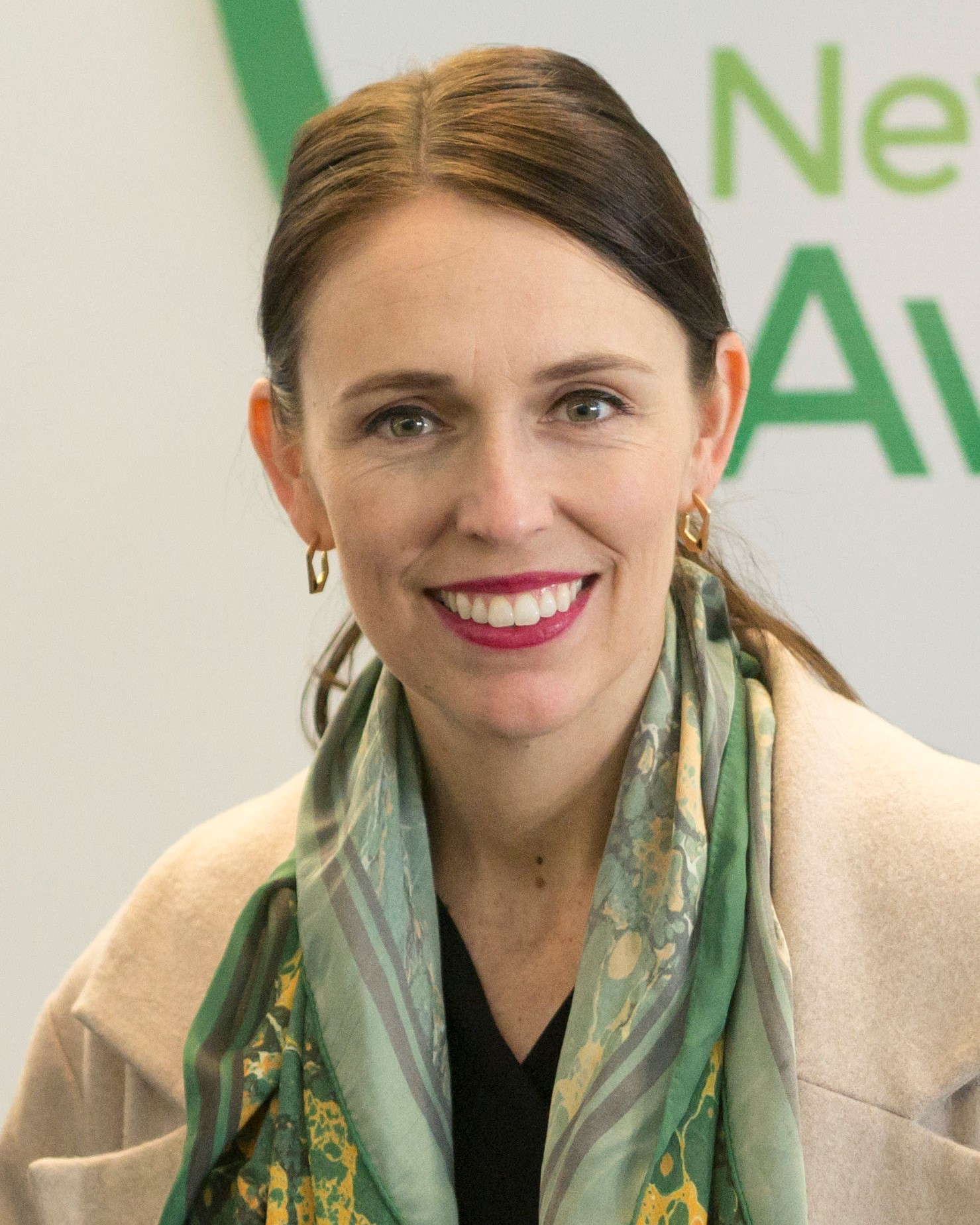
Jacinda Ardern
Prime Minister of New Zealand
(2017–2023)

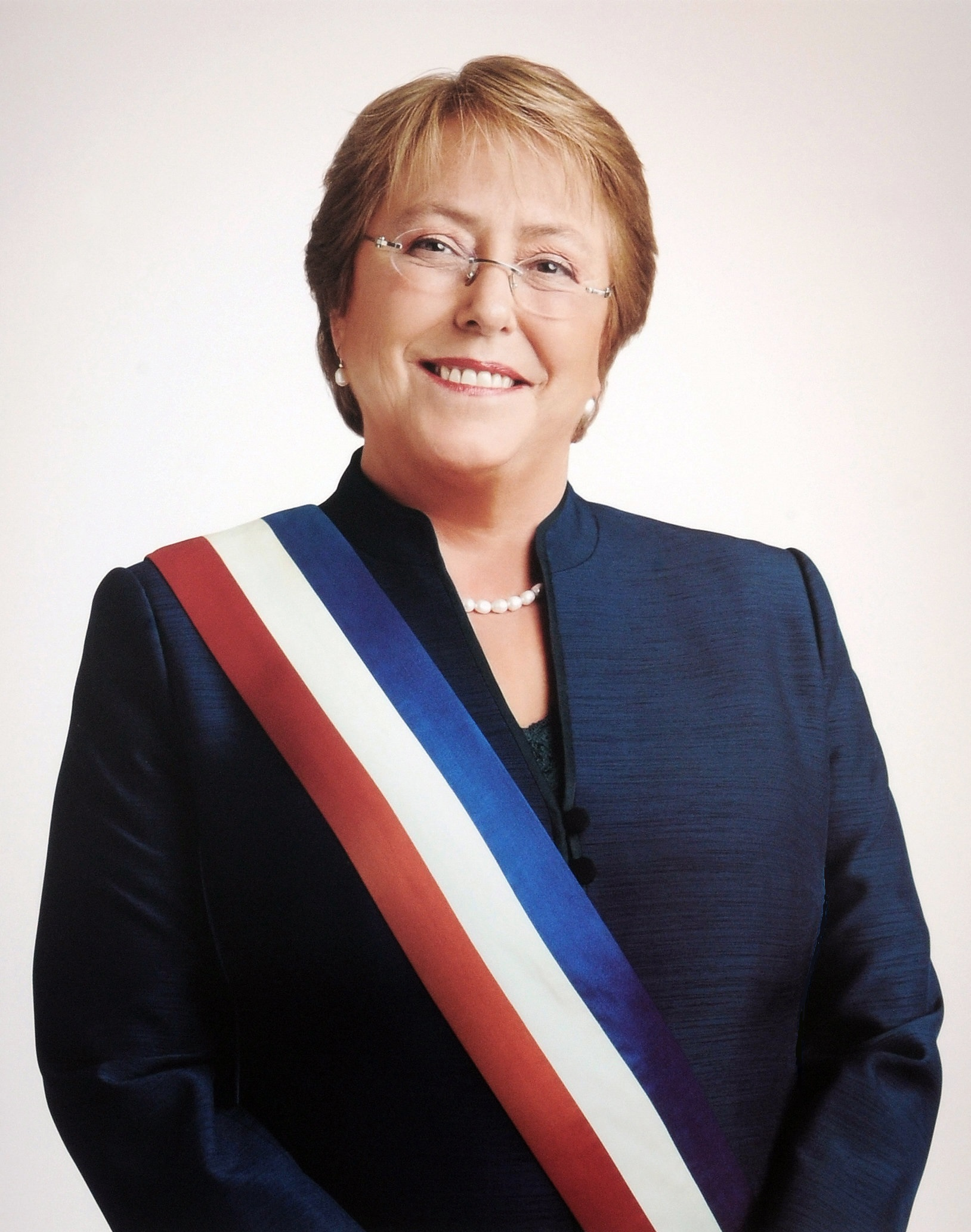
Michelle Bachelet
President of Chile
(2006–2010, 2014–2018)

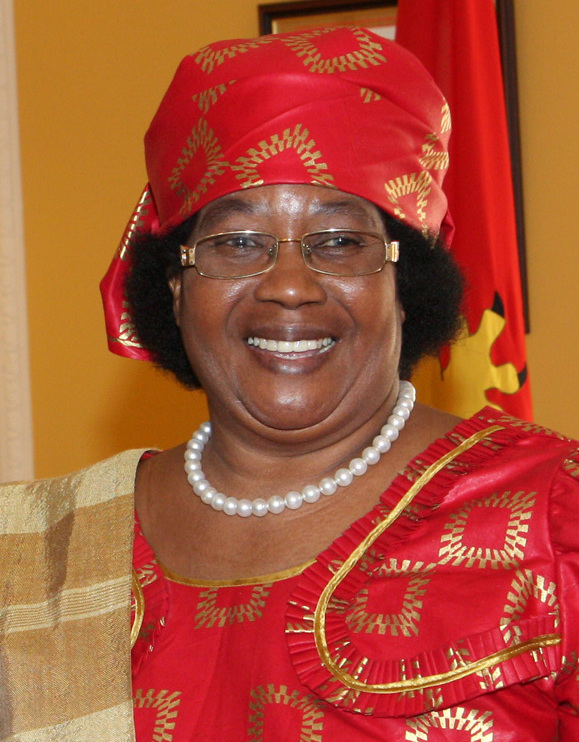
Joyce Banda
President of Malawi
(2012–2014)

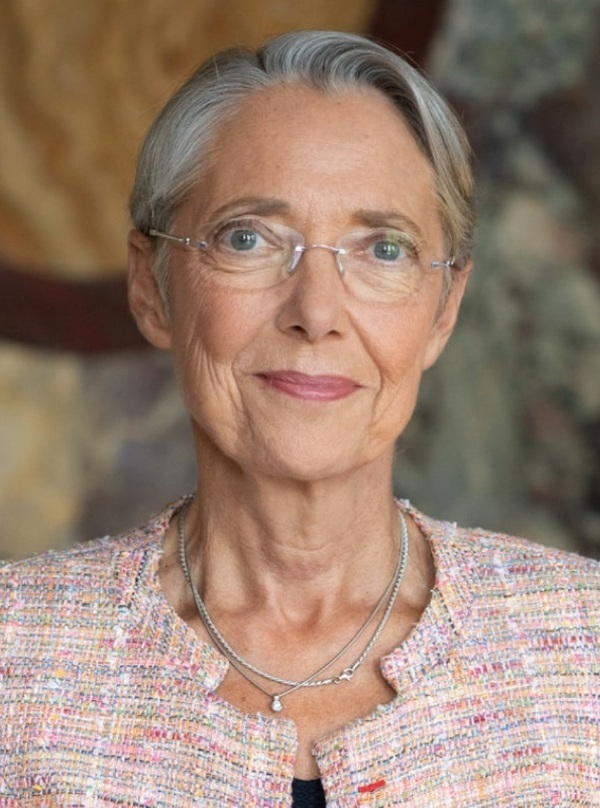
Élisabeth Borne
Prime Minister of France
(2022–2024)

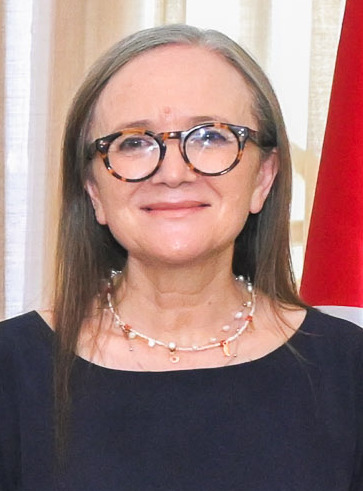
Najla Bouden
Prime Minister of Tunisia
(2021–2023)

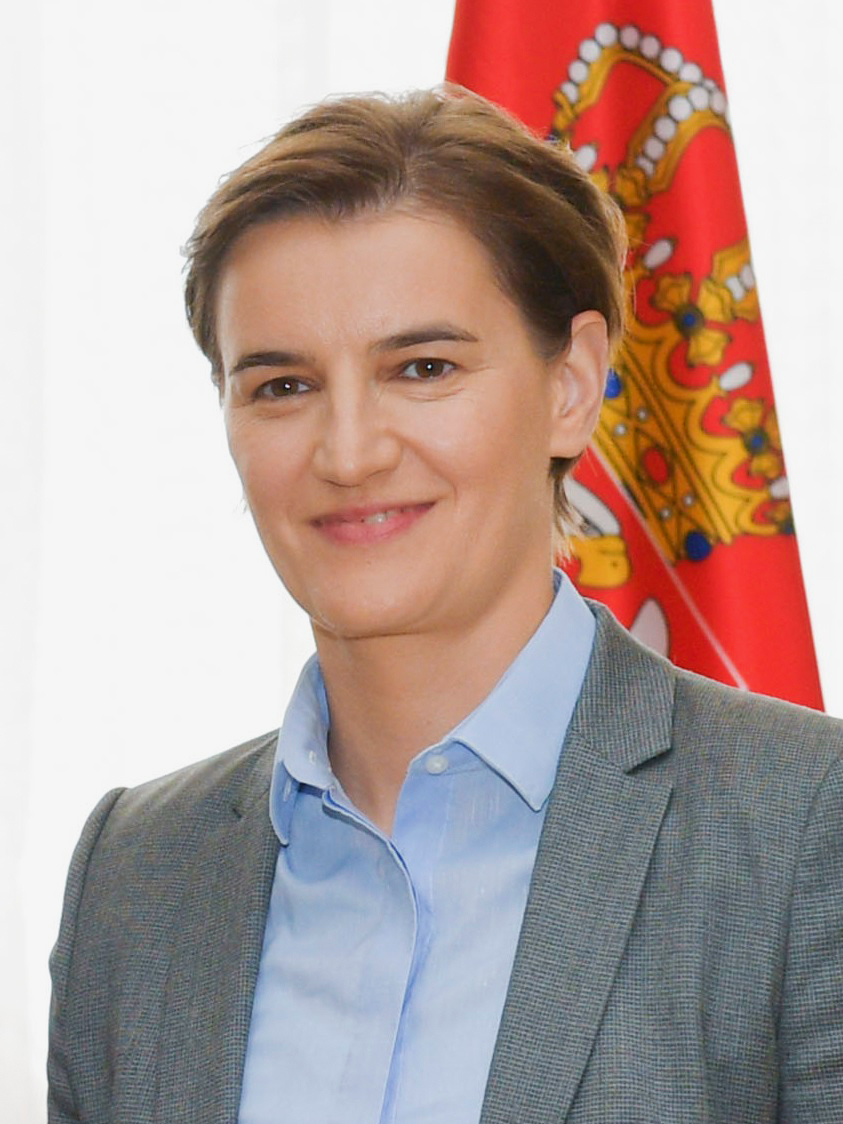
Ana Brnabić
Prime Minister of Serbia
(2017–2024)

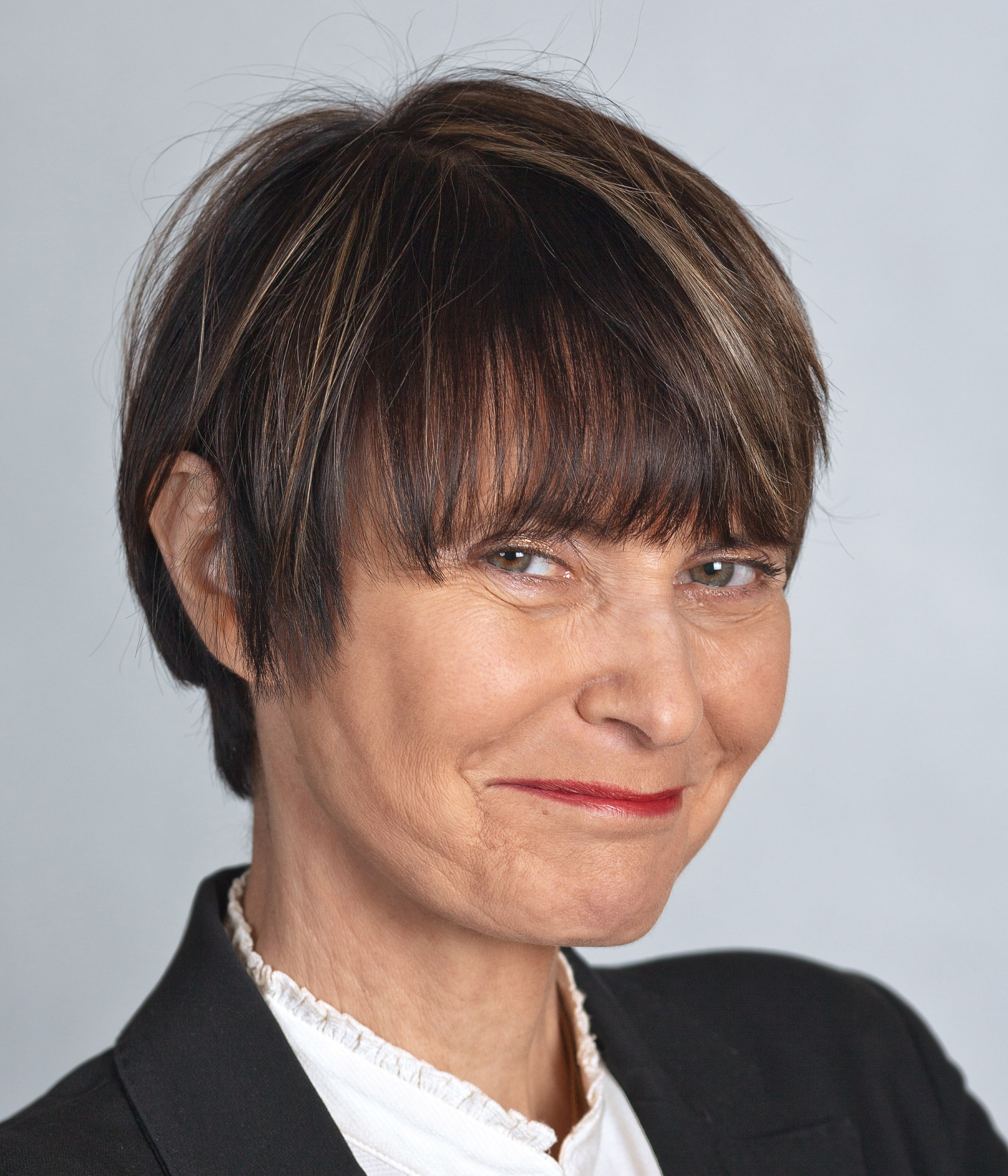
Micheline Calmy-Rey
President of Switzerland
(2007, 2011)

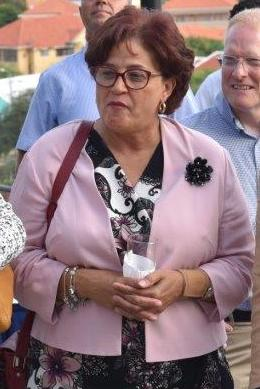
Susanne Camelia-Römer
Prime Minister of the Netherlands Antilles
(1993, 1998–1999)

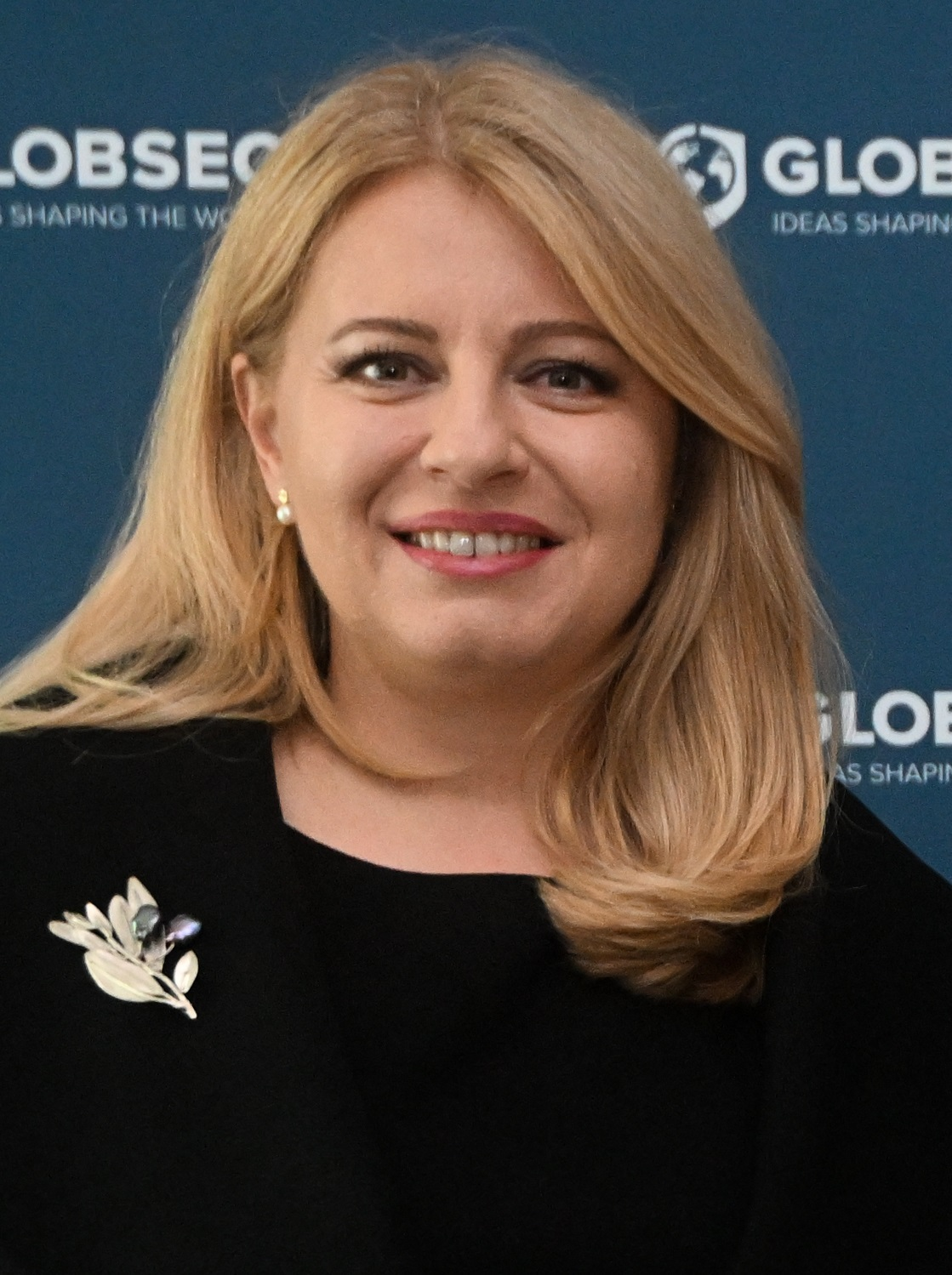
Zuzana Čaputová
President of Slovakia
(2019–2024)

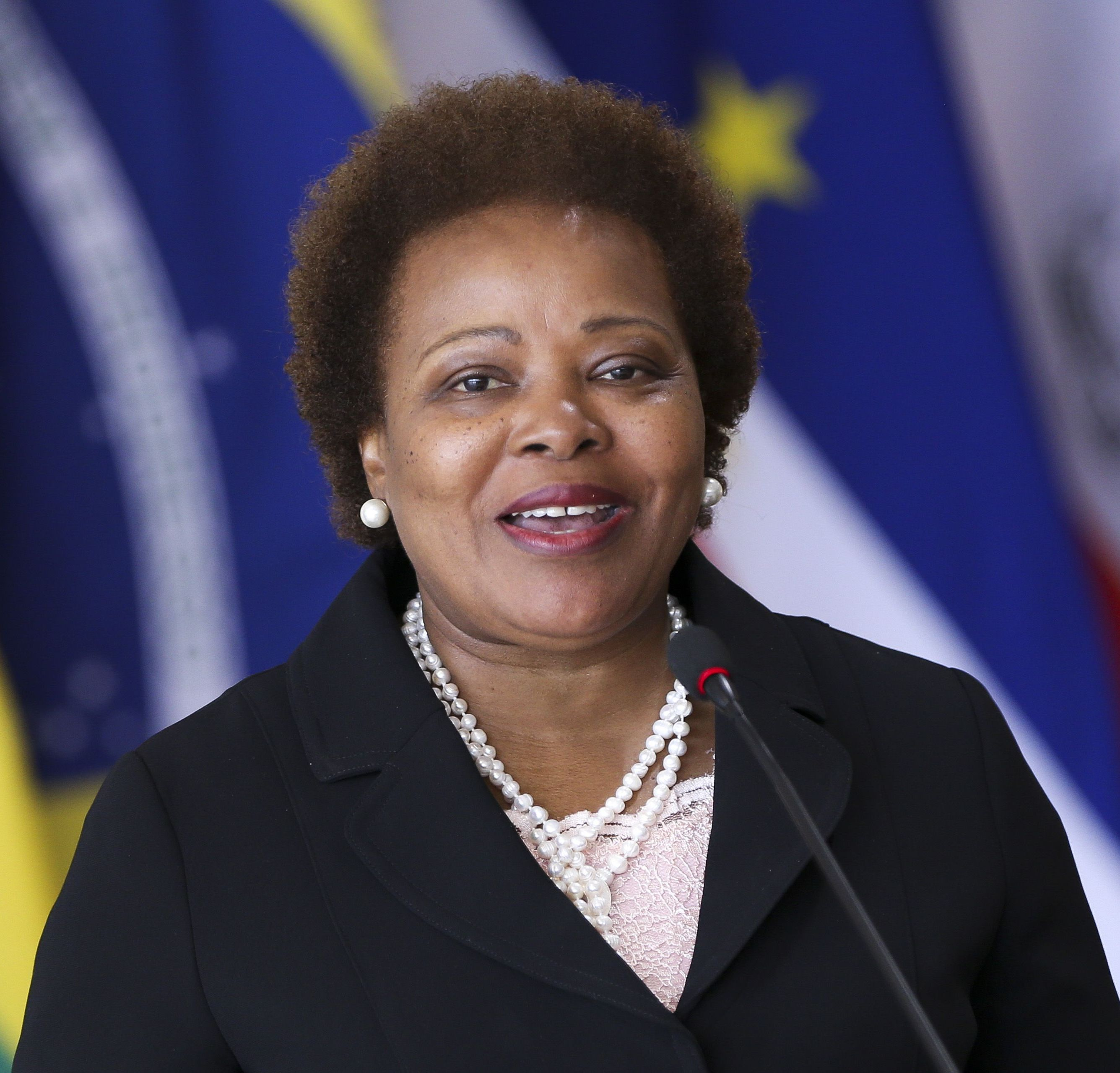
Maria do Carmo Silveira
Prime Minister of São Tomé and Príncipe
(2005–2006)

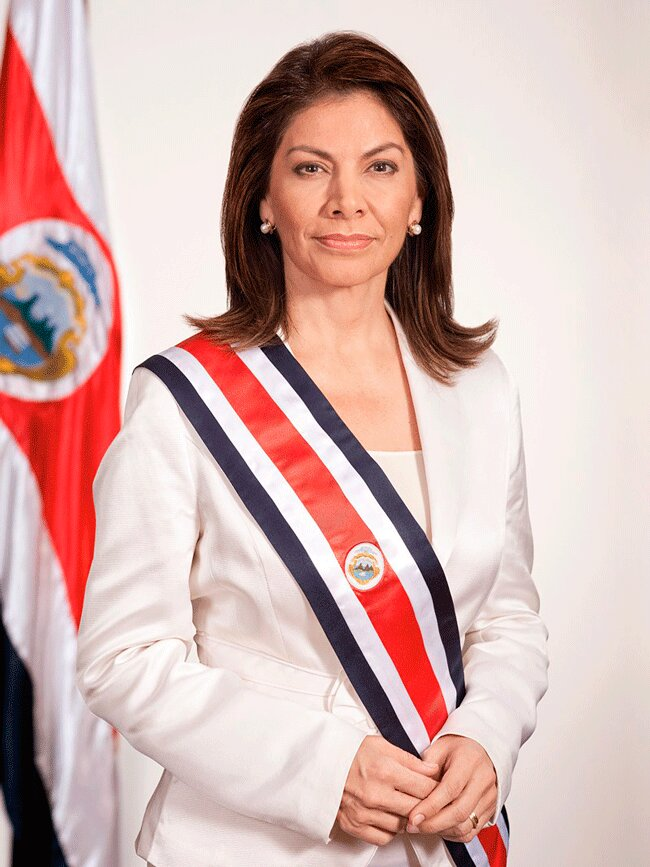
Laura Chinchilla Miranda
President of Costa Rica
(2010–2014)

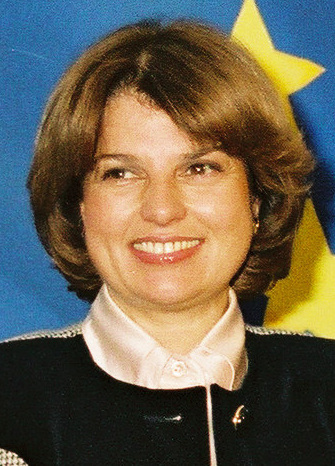
Tansu Çiller
Prime Minister of Turkey
(1993–1996)

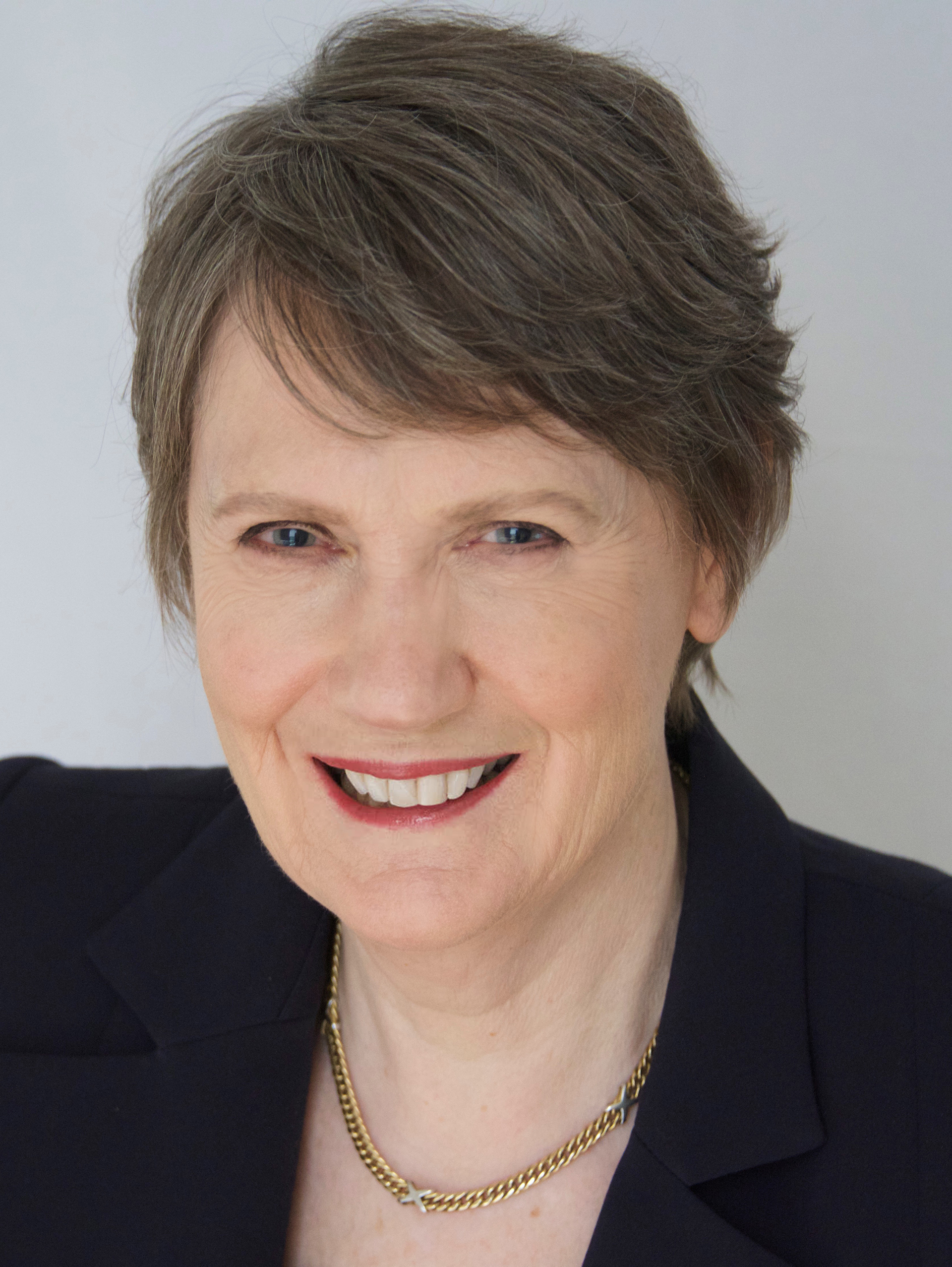
Helen Clark
Prime Minister of New Zealand
(1999–2008)

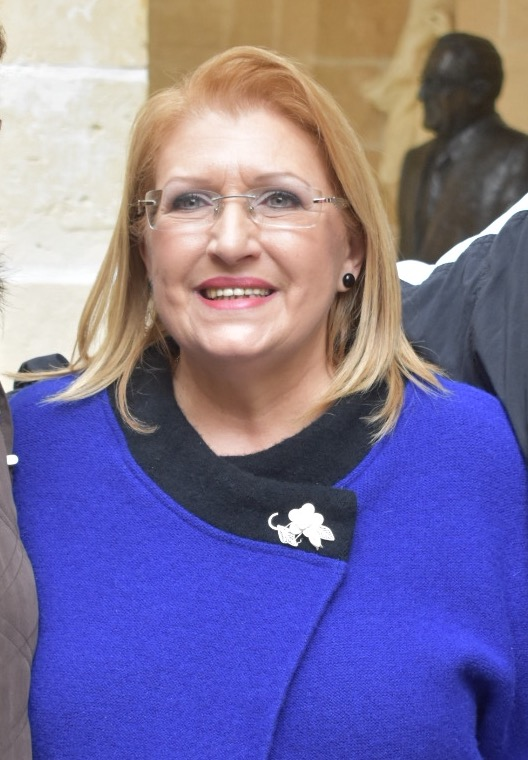
Marie-Louise Coleiro Preca
President of Malta
(2014–2019)

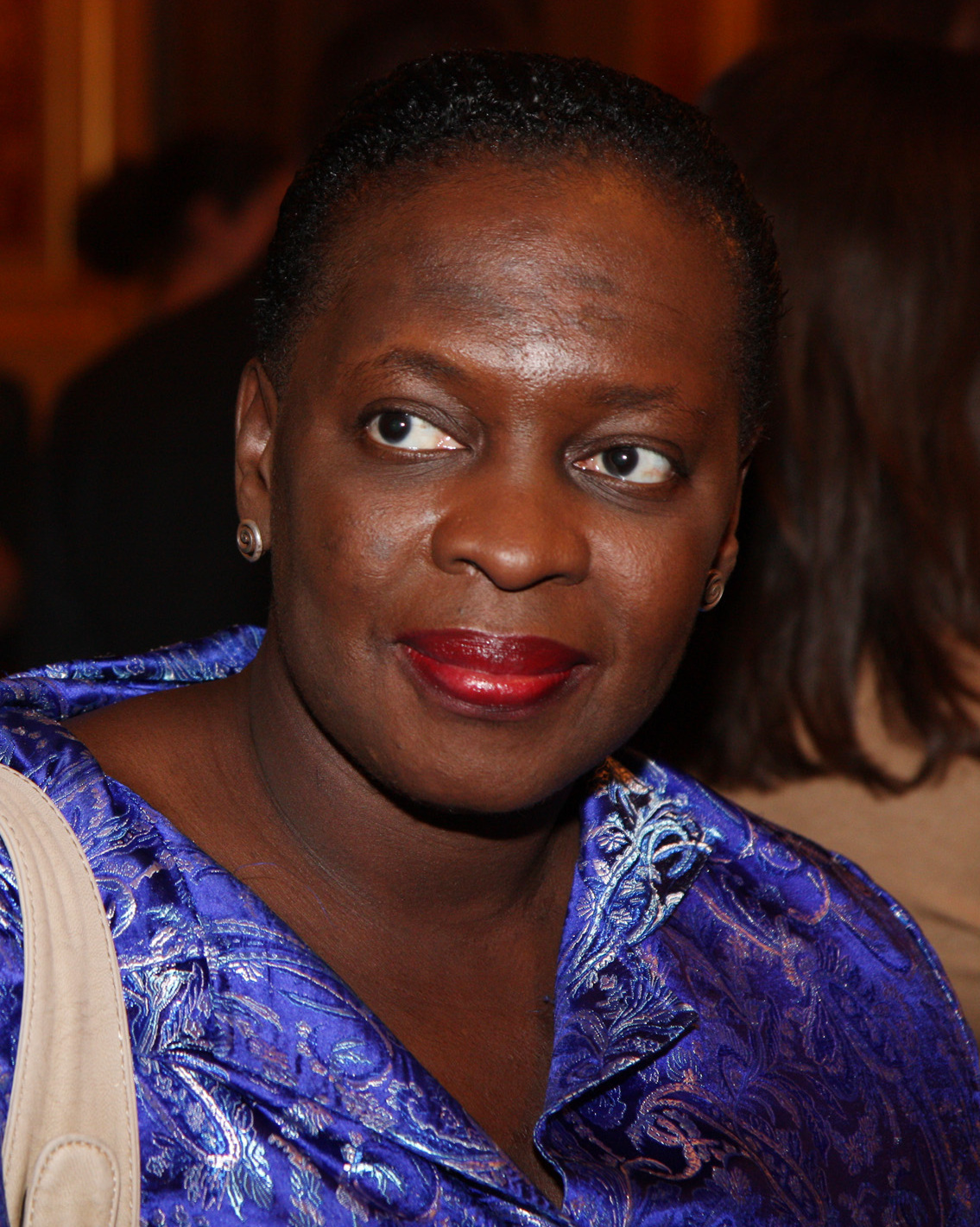
Paula Cox
Premier of Bermuda
(2010–2012)

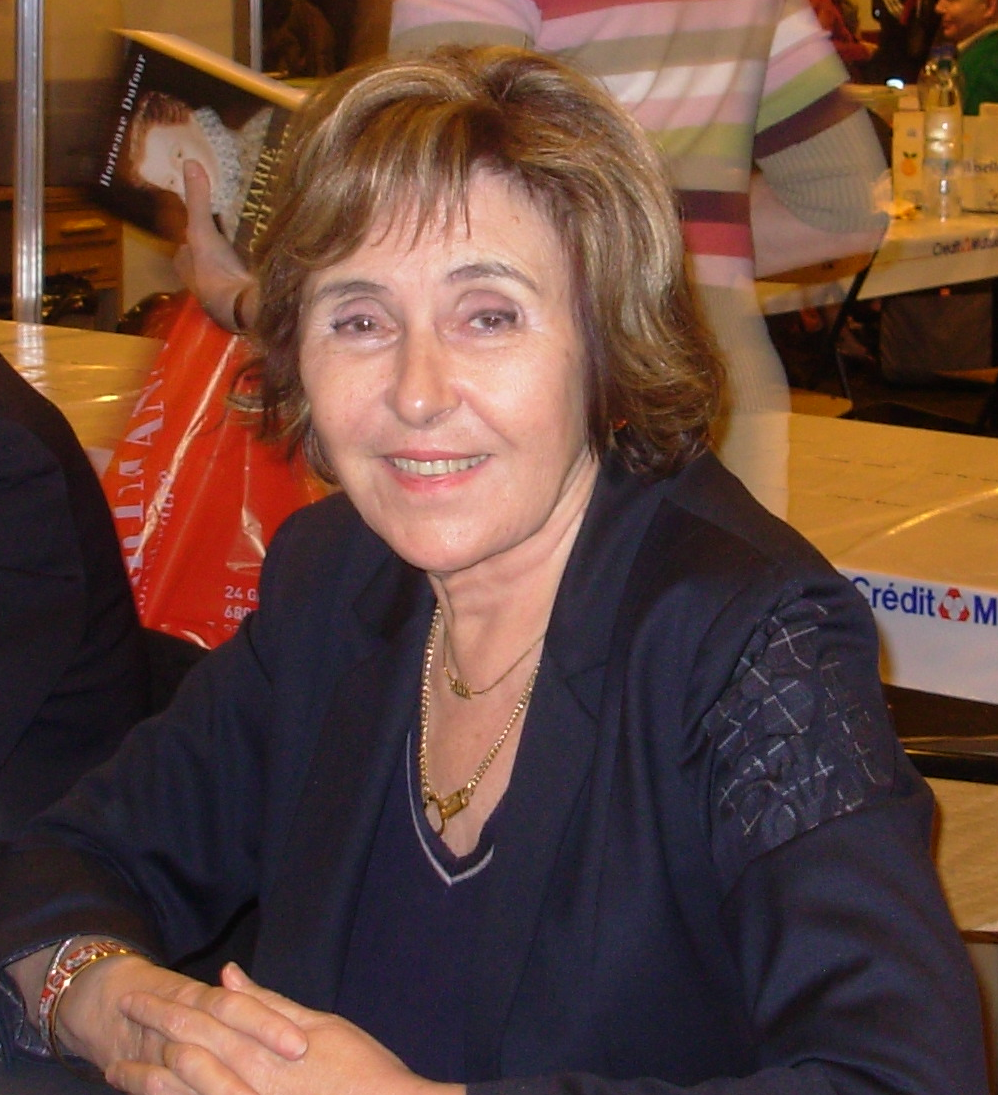
Édith Cresson
Prime Minister of France
(1991–1992)

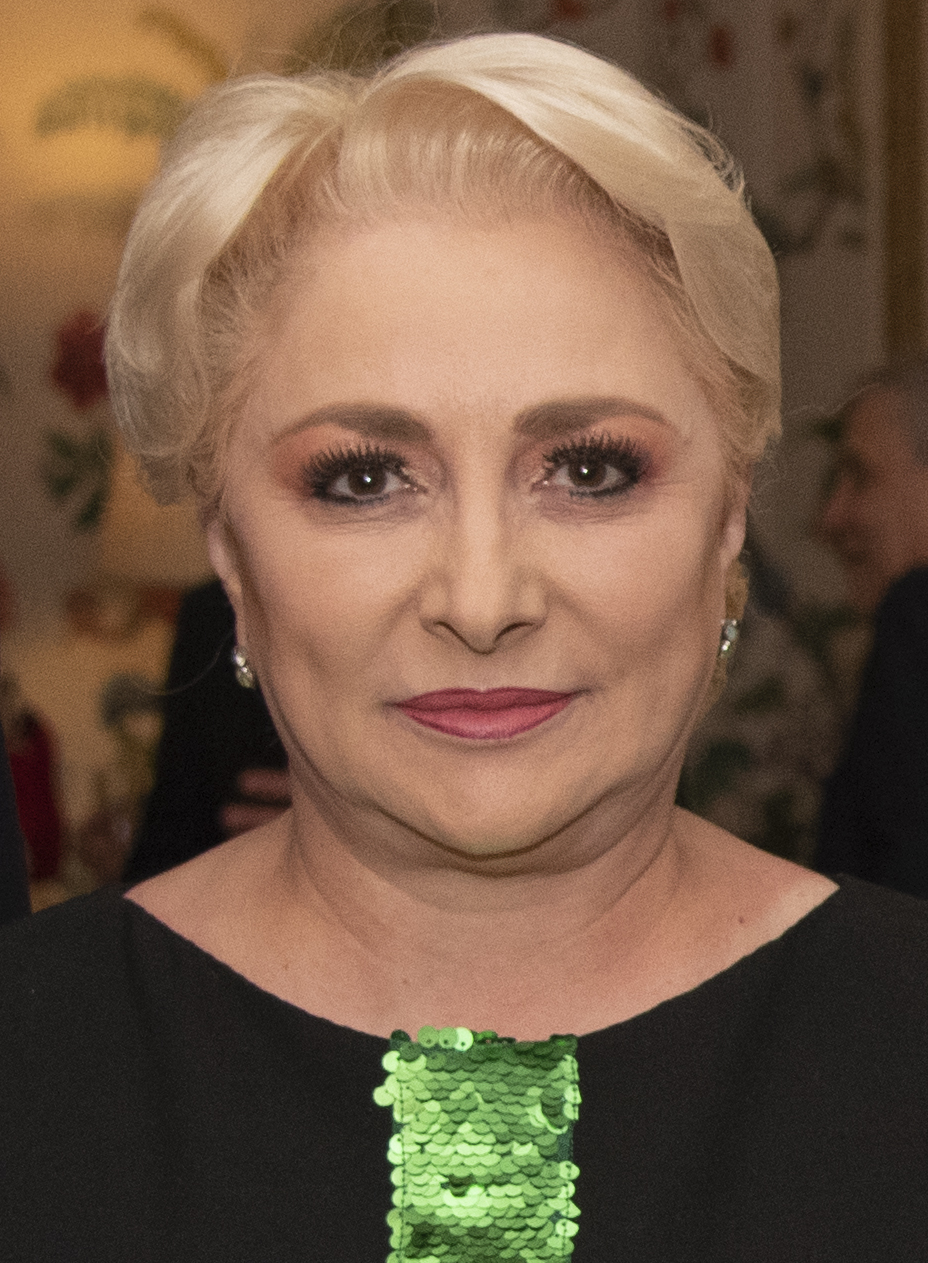
Viorica Dăncilă
Prime Minister of Romania
(2018–2019)

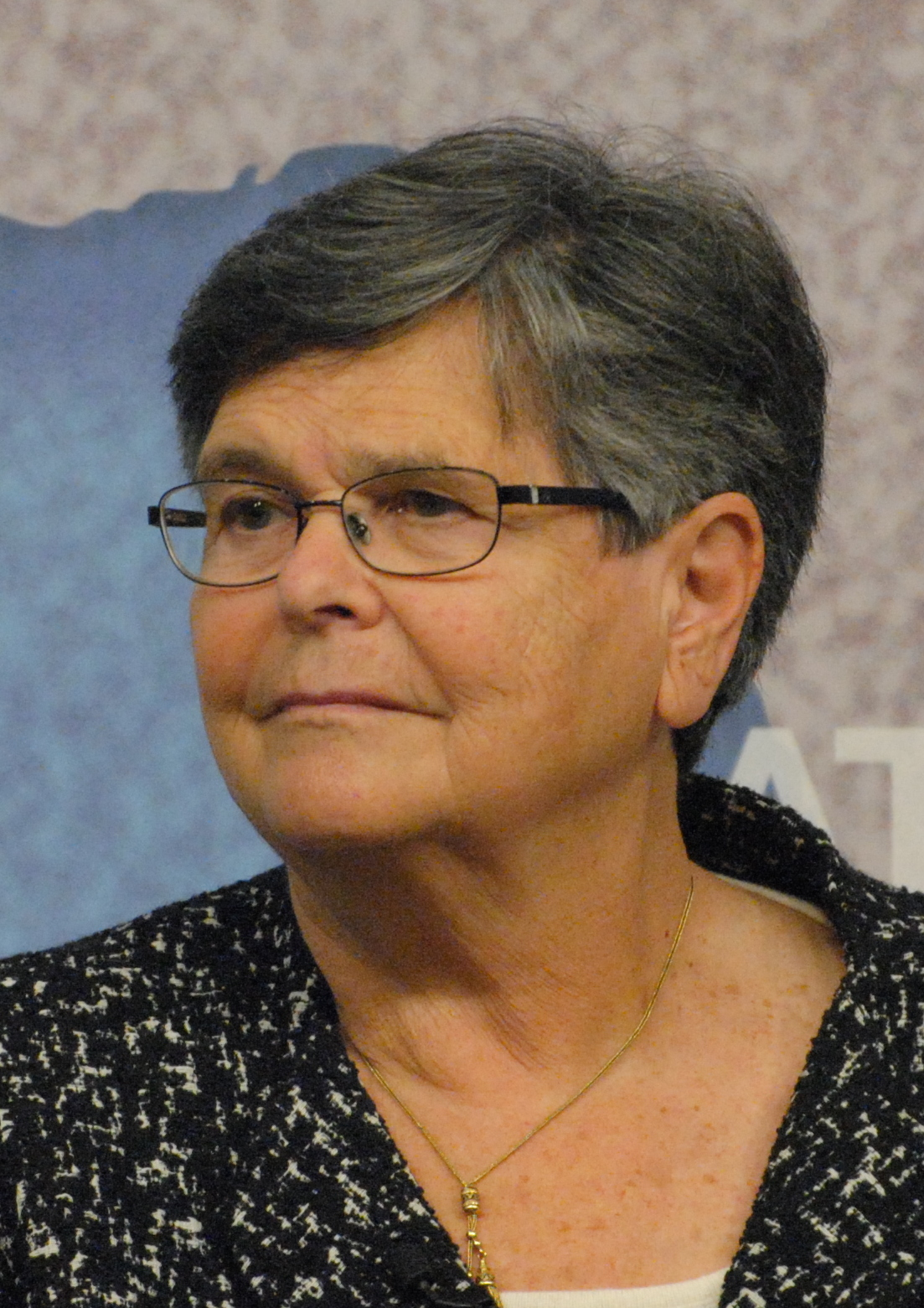
Ruth Dreifuss
President of Switzerland
(1999)

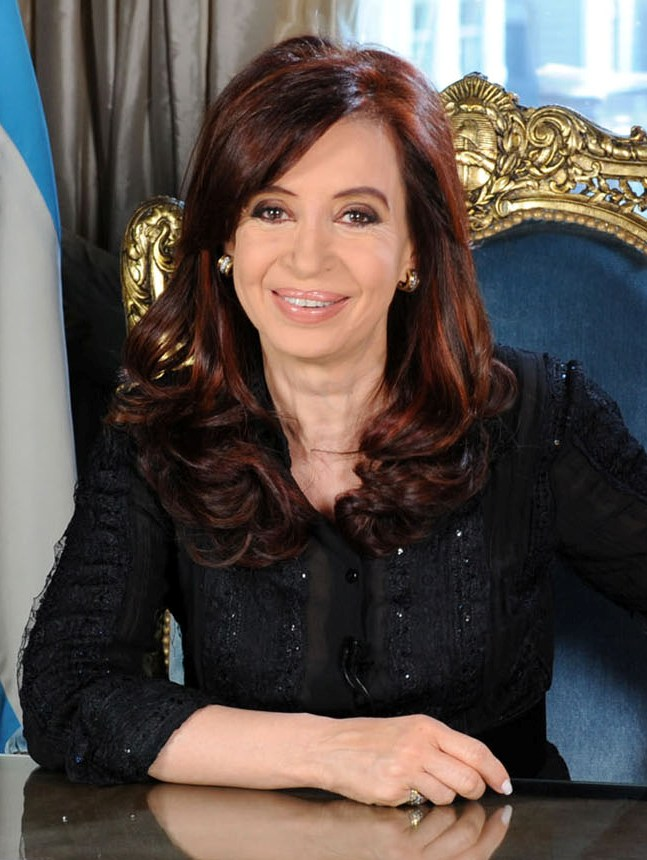
Cristina Fernández de Kirchner
President of Argentina
(2007–2015)

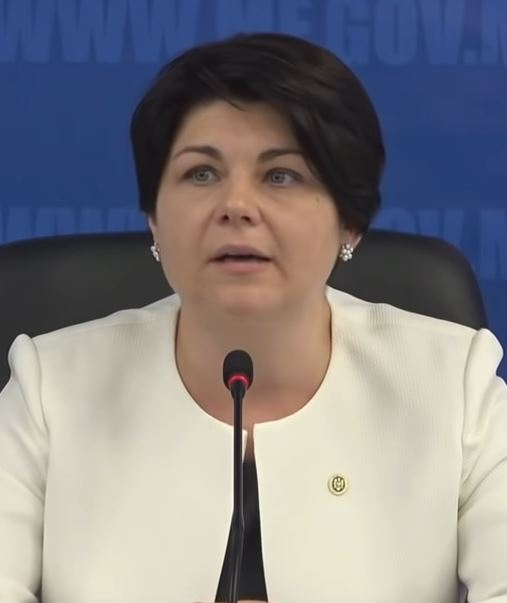
Natalia Gavrilița
Prime Minister of Moldova
(2021–2023)

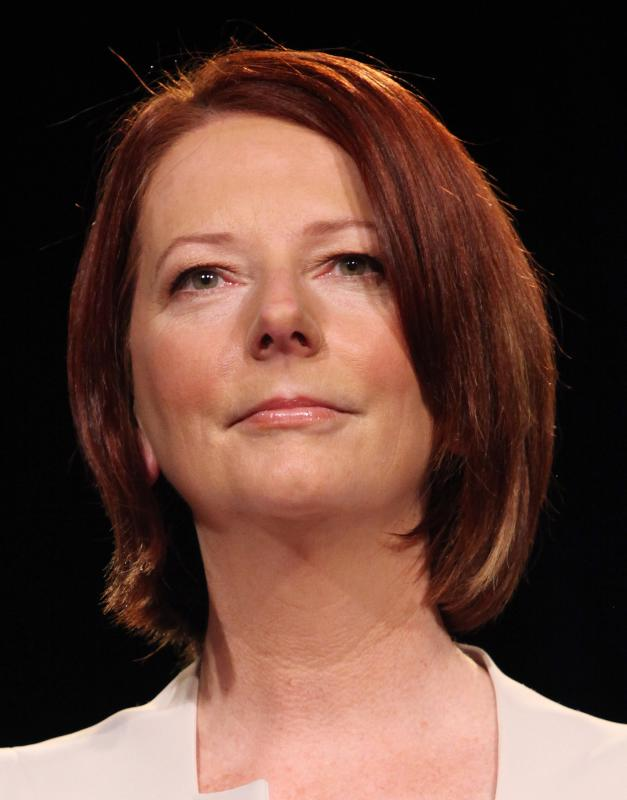
Julia Gillard
Prime Minister of Australia
(2010–2013)

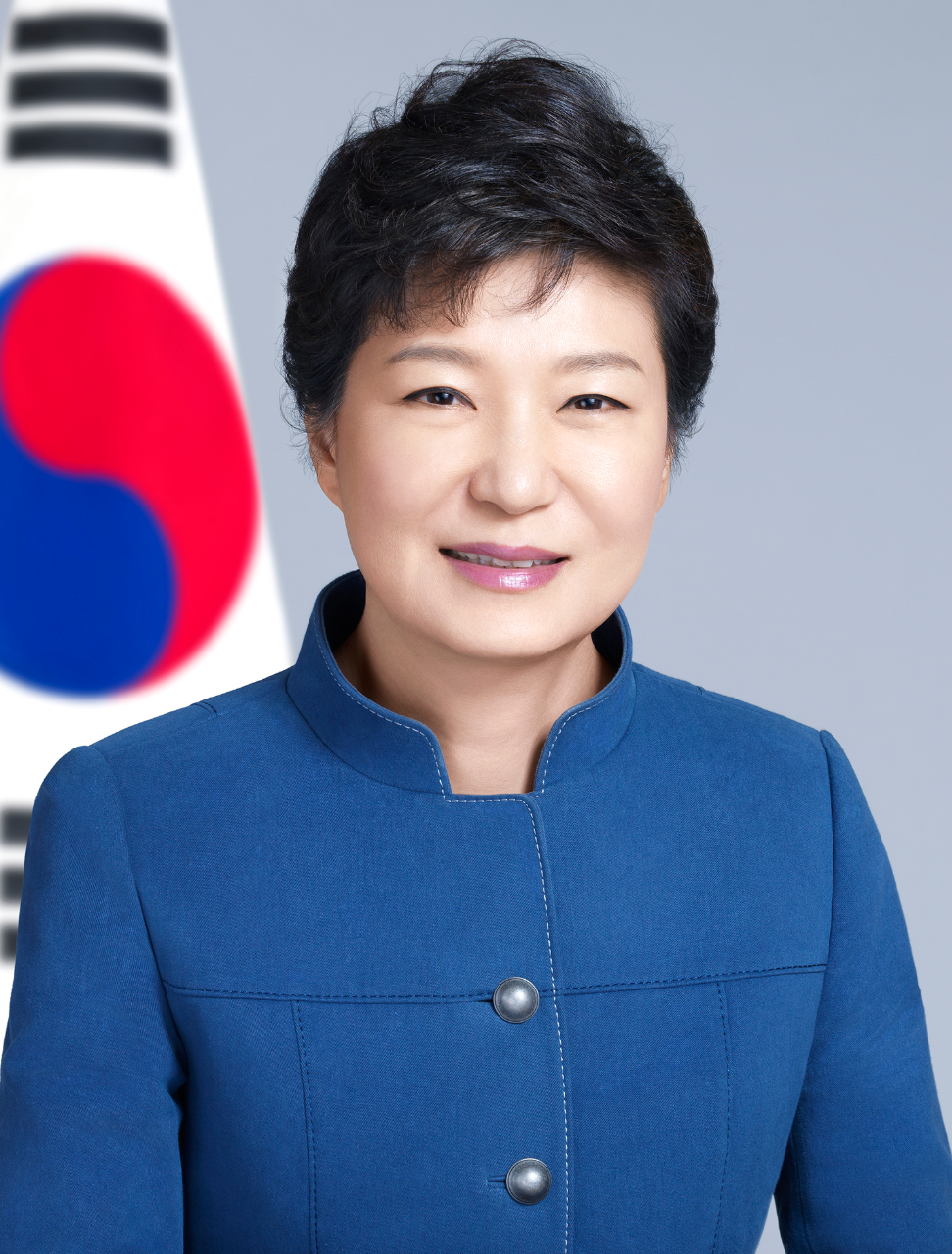
Park Geun-hye
President of South Korea
(2013–2017)

Pamela F. Gordon
Premier of Bermuda
(1997–1998)

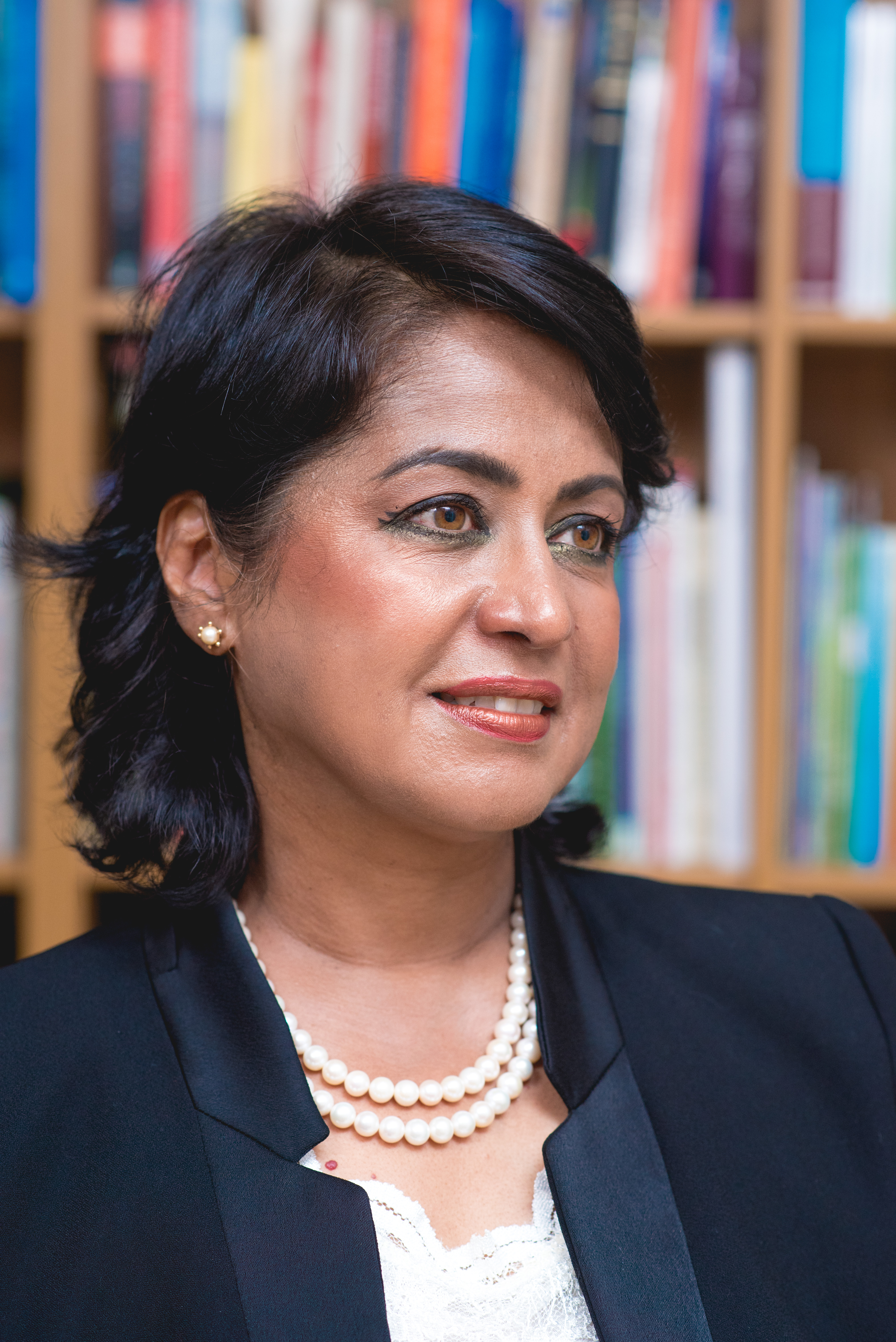
Ameenah Gurib-Fakim
President of Mauritius
(2015–2018)

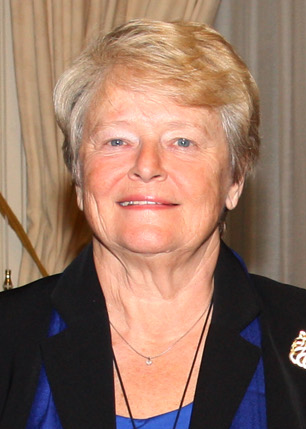
Gro Harlem Brundtland
Prime Minister of Norway
(1981, 1986–1989, 1990–1996)

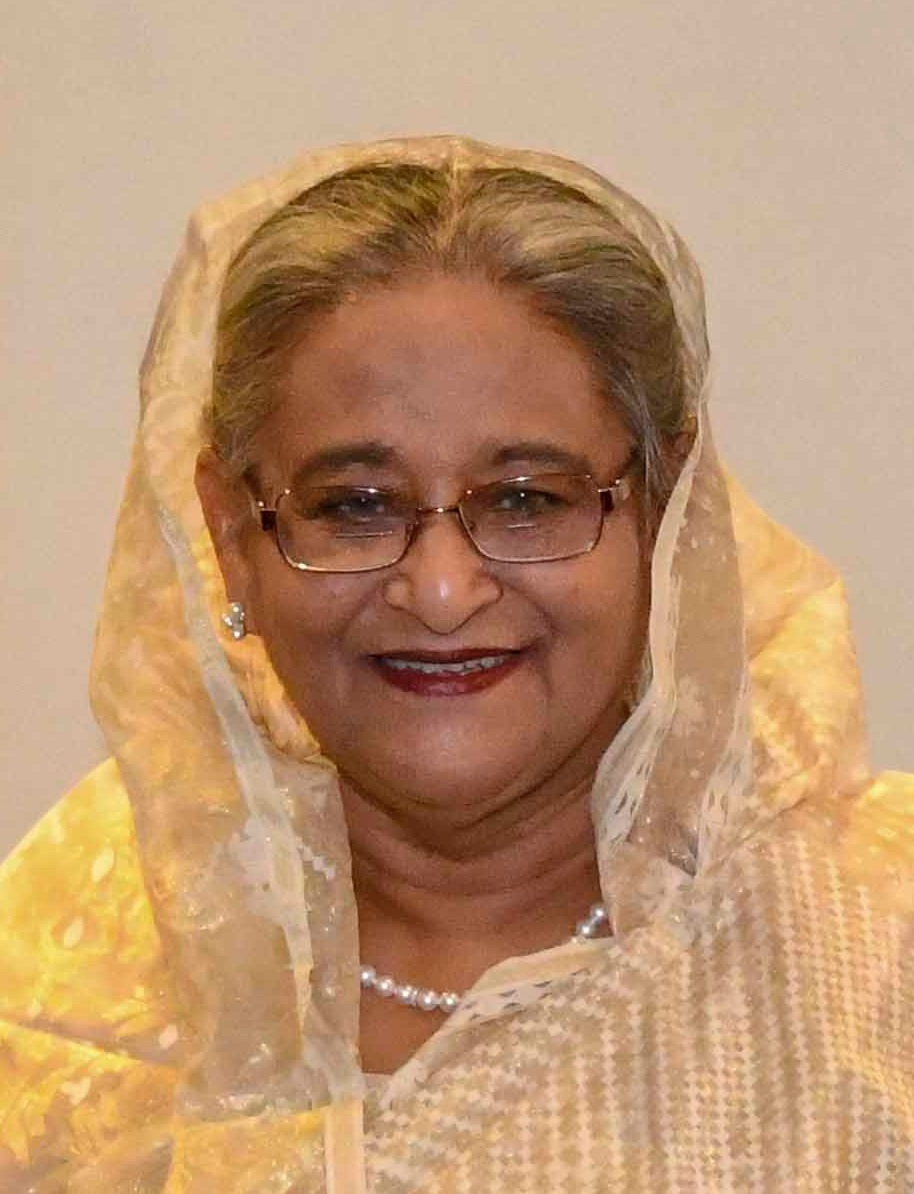
Sheikh Hasina
Prime Minister of Bangladesh
(1996–2001, 2009–2024)

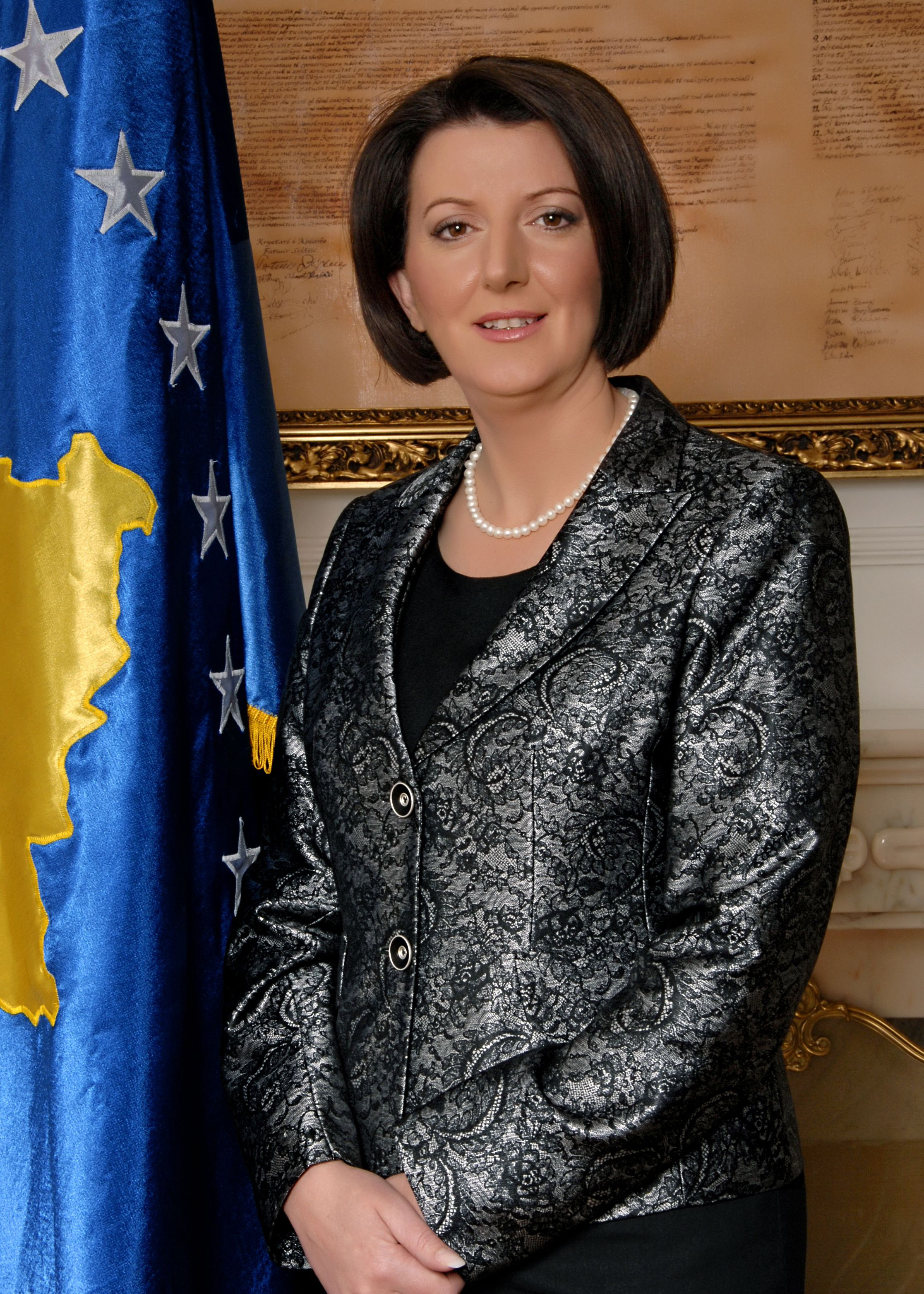
Atifete Jahjaga
President of Kosovo
(2011–2016)

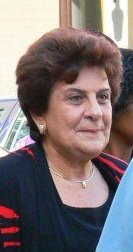
Emily de Jongh-Elhage
Prime Minister of the Netherlands Antilles
(2006–2010)

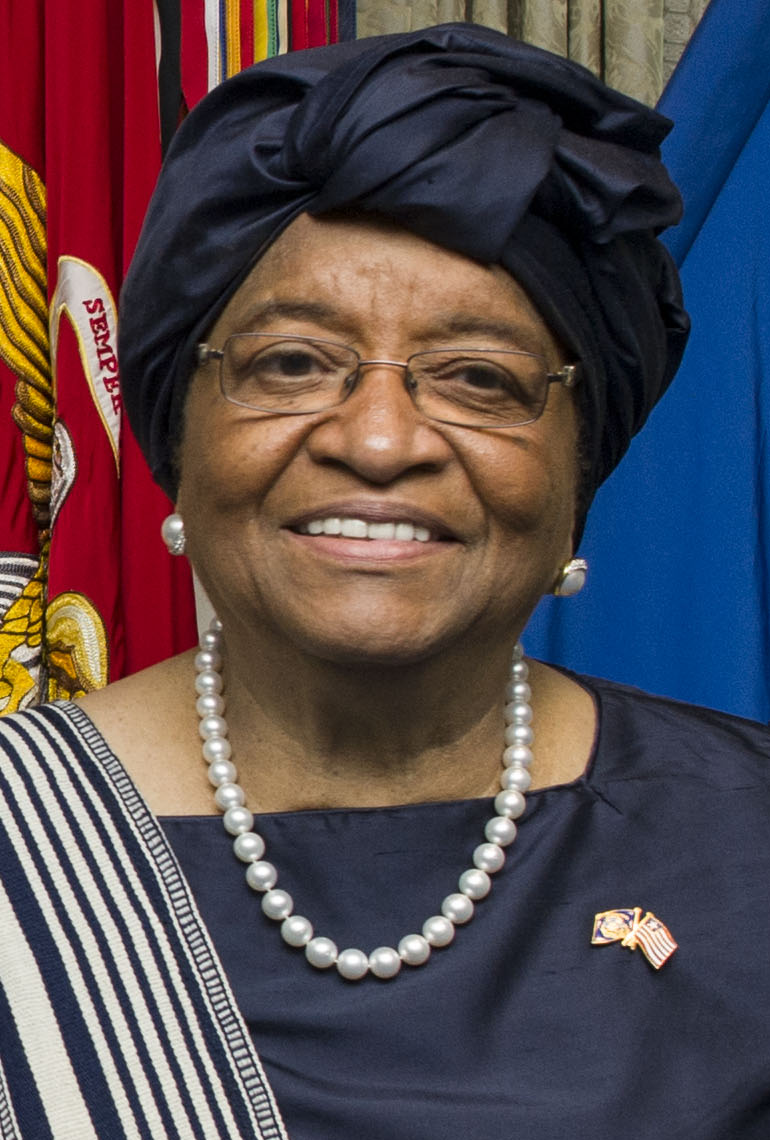
Ellen Johnson Sirleaf
President of Liberia
(2006–2018)

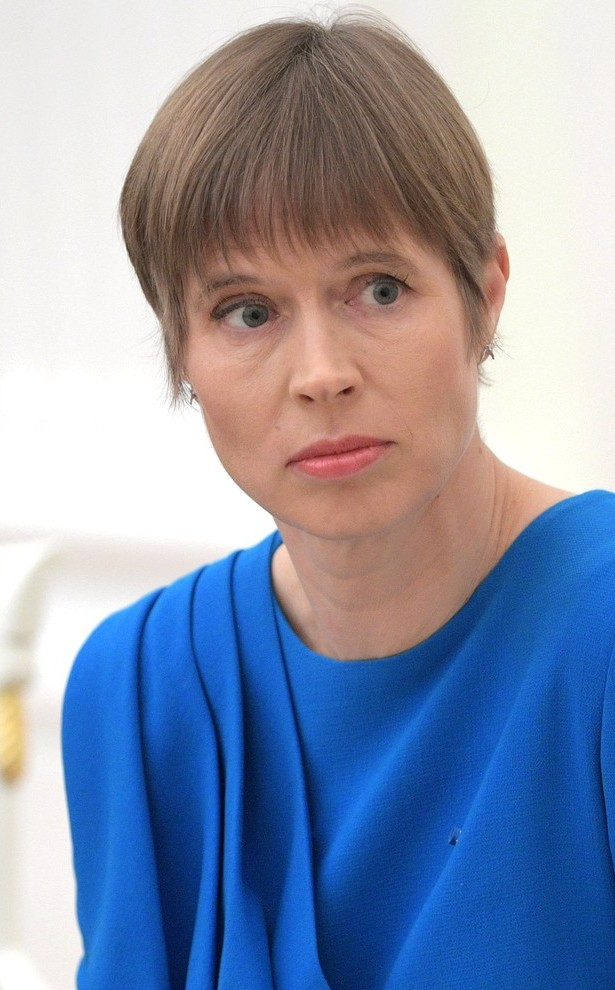
Kersti Kaljulaid
President of Estonia
(2016–2021)

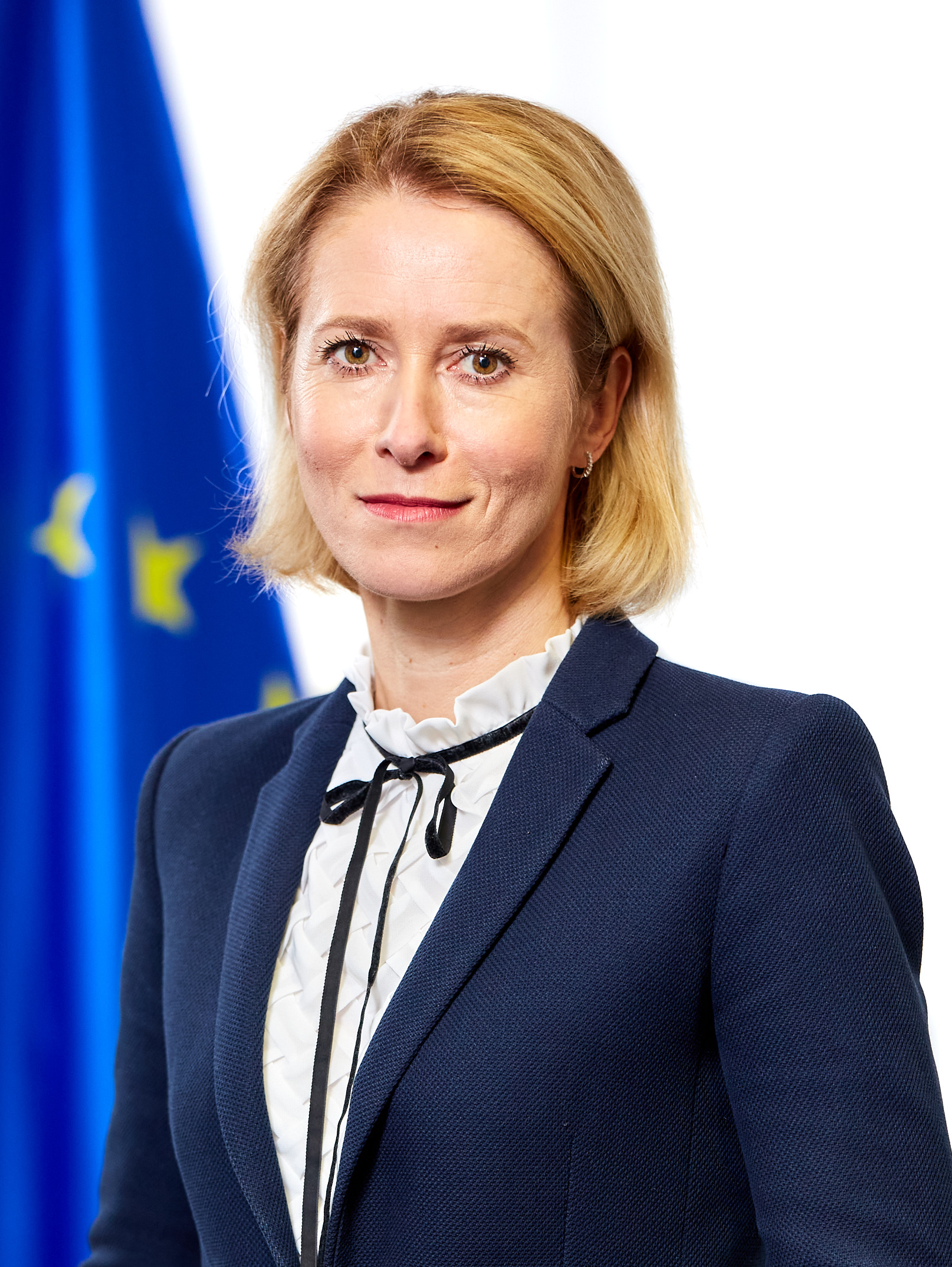
Kaja Kallas
Prime Minister of Estonia
(2021–2024)

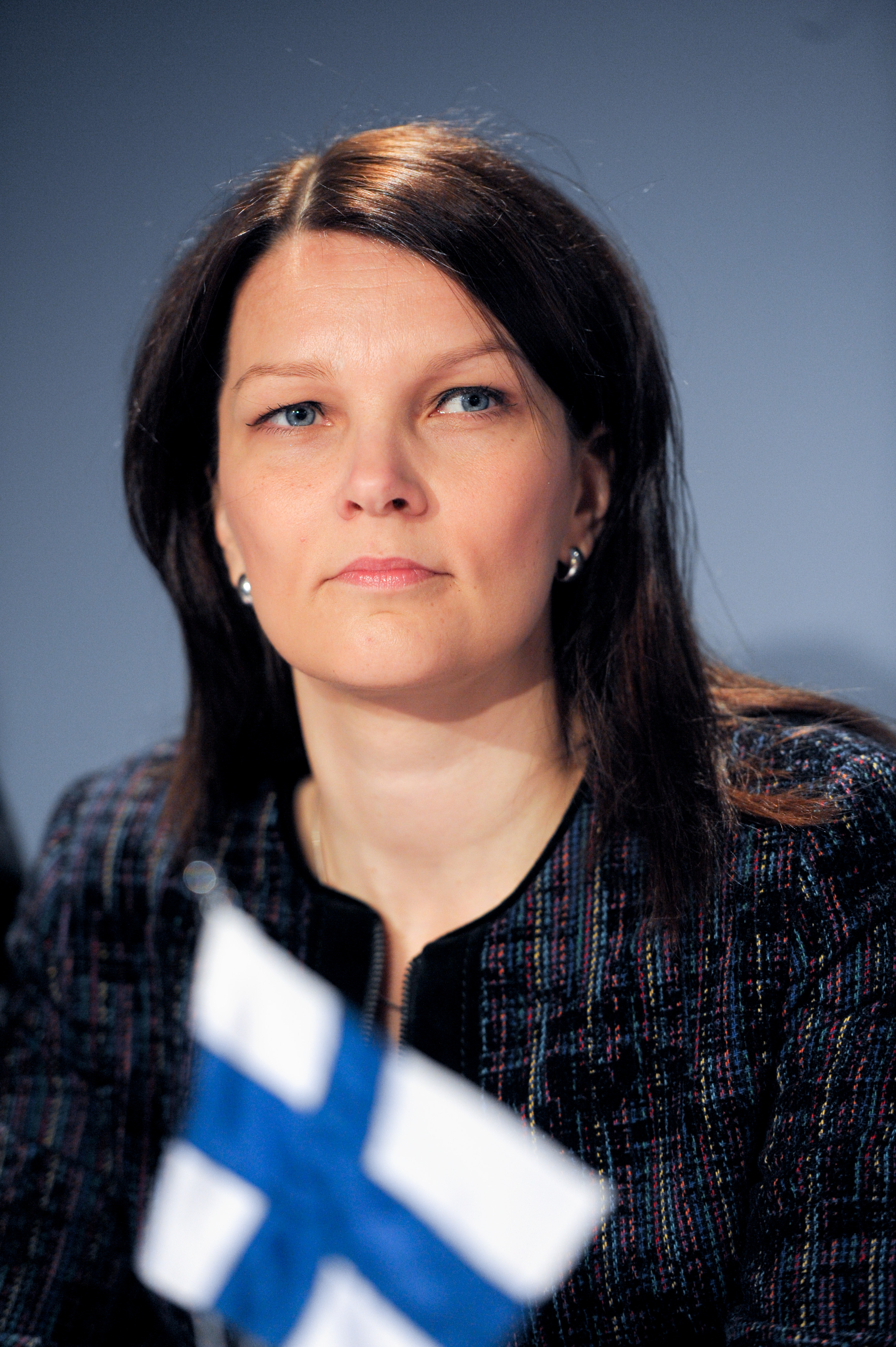
Mari Kiviniemi
Prime Minister of Finland
(2010–2011)

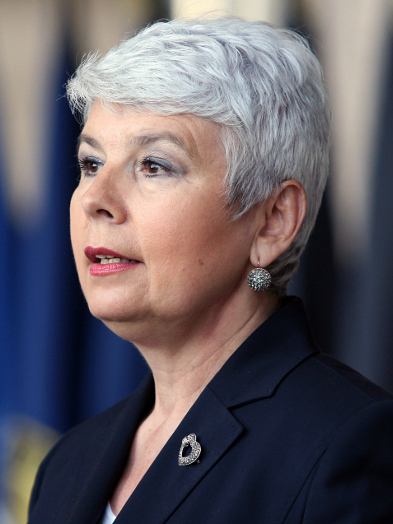
Jadranka Kosor
Prime Minister of Croatia
(2009–2011)

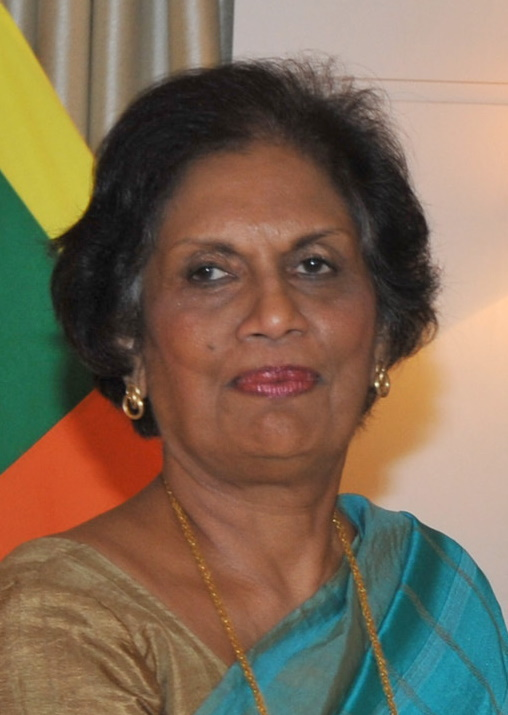
Chandrika Kumaratunga
President of Sri Lanka (1994–2005) Prime Minister of Sri Lanka (1994)

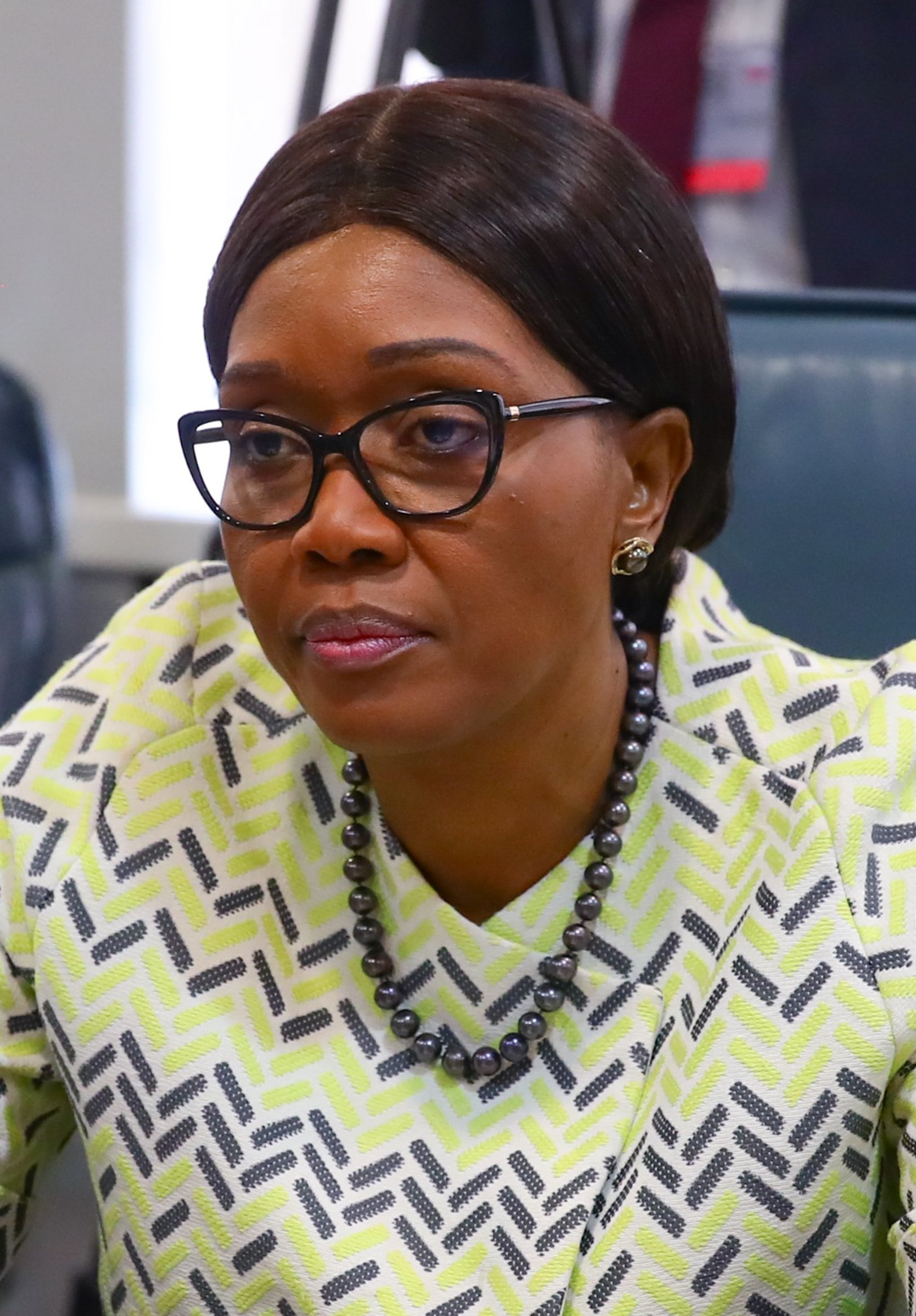
Saara Kuugongelwa
Prime Minister of Namibia
(2015–2025)

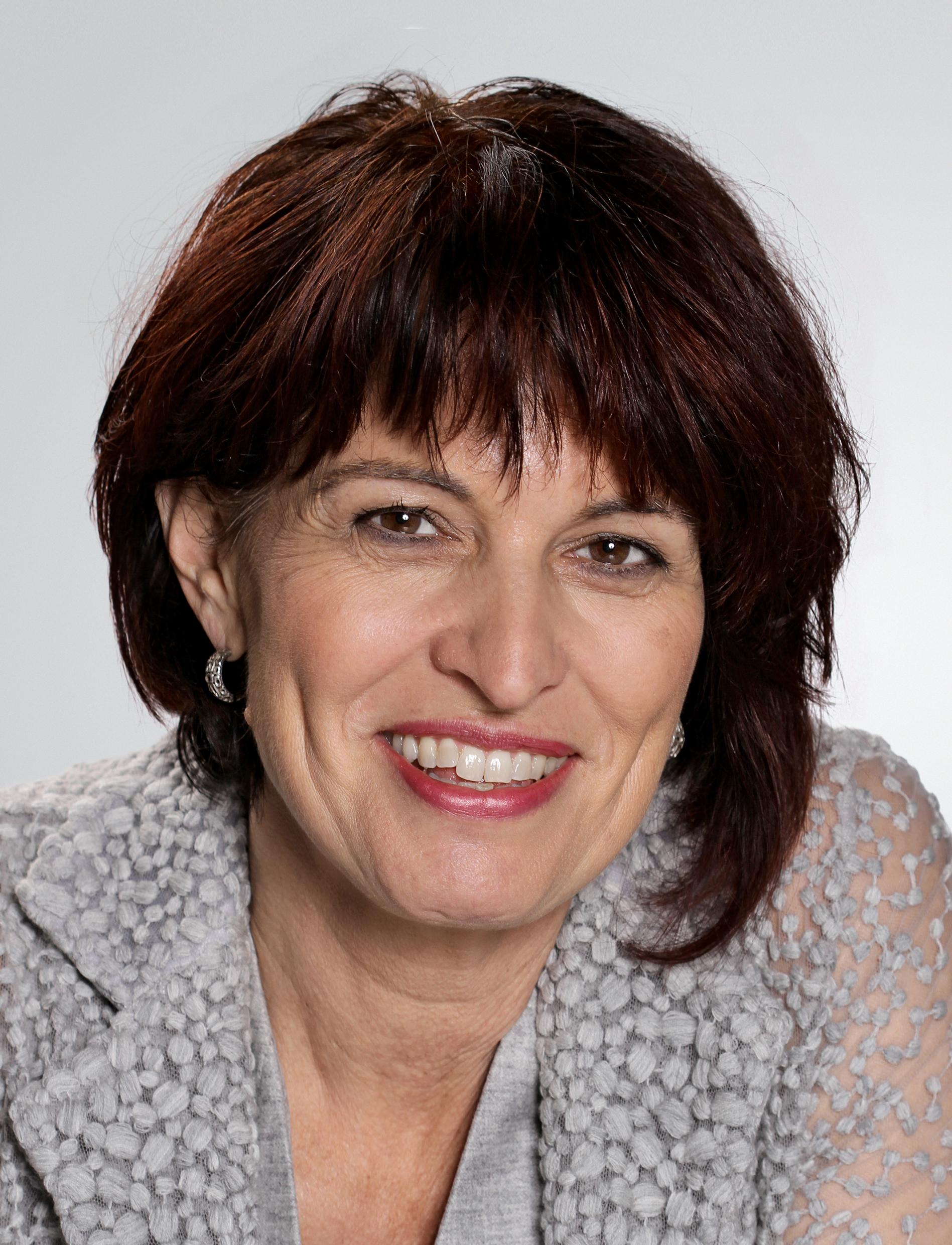
Doris Leuthard
President of Switzerland
(2010)

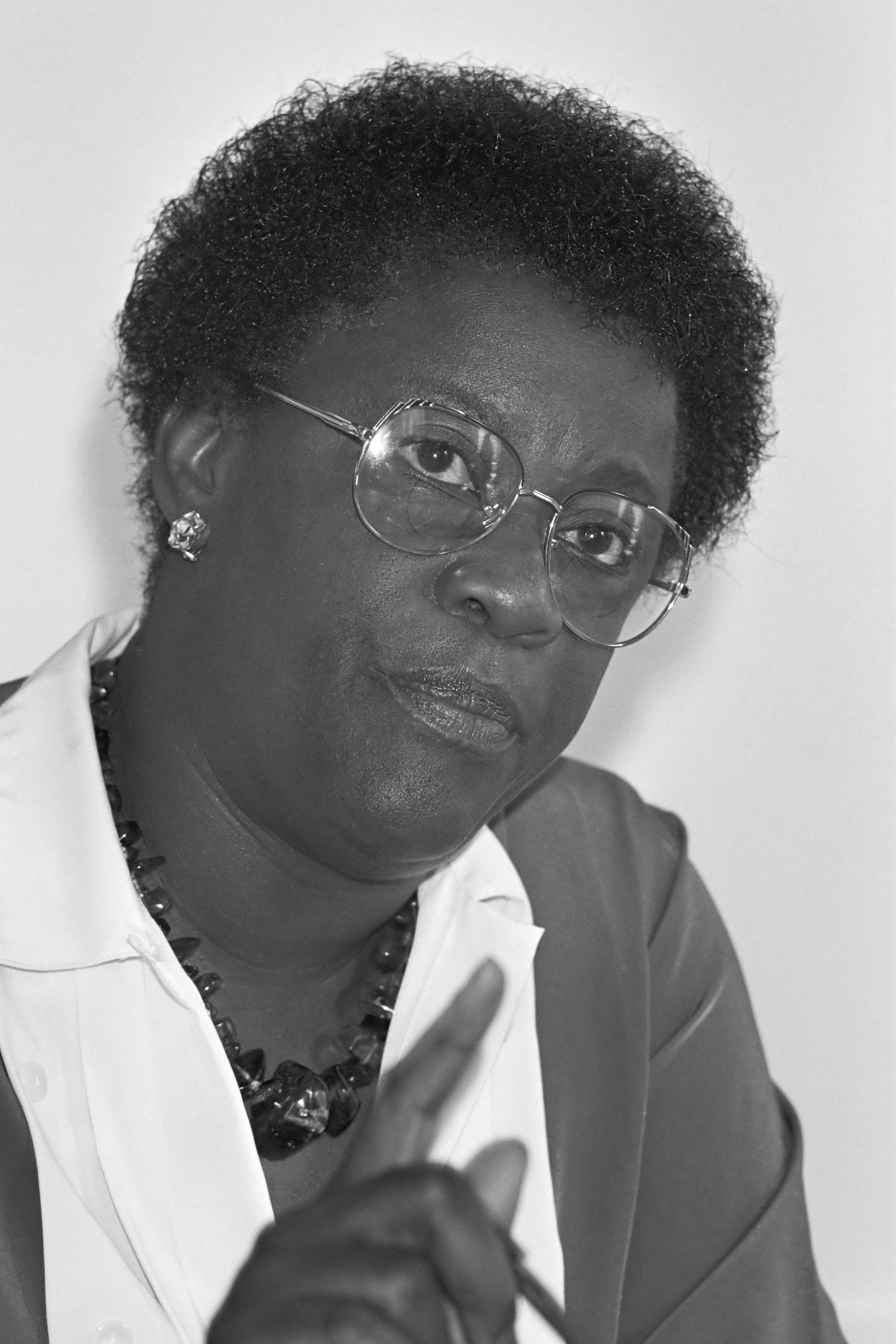
Maria Liberia Peters
Prime Minister of the Netherlands Antilles
(1984–1986, 1988–1994)

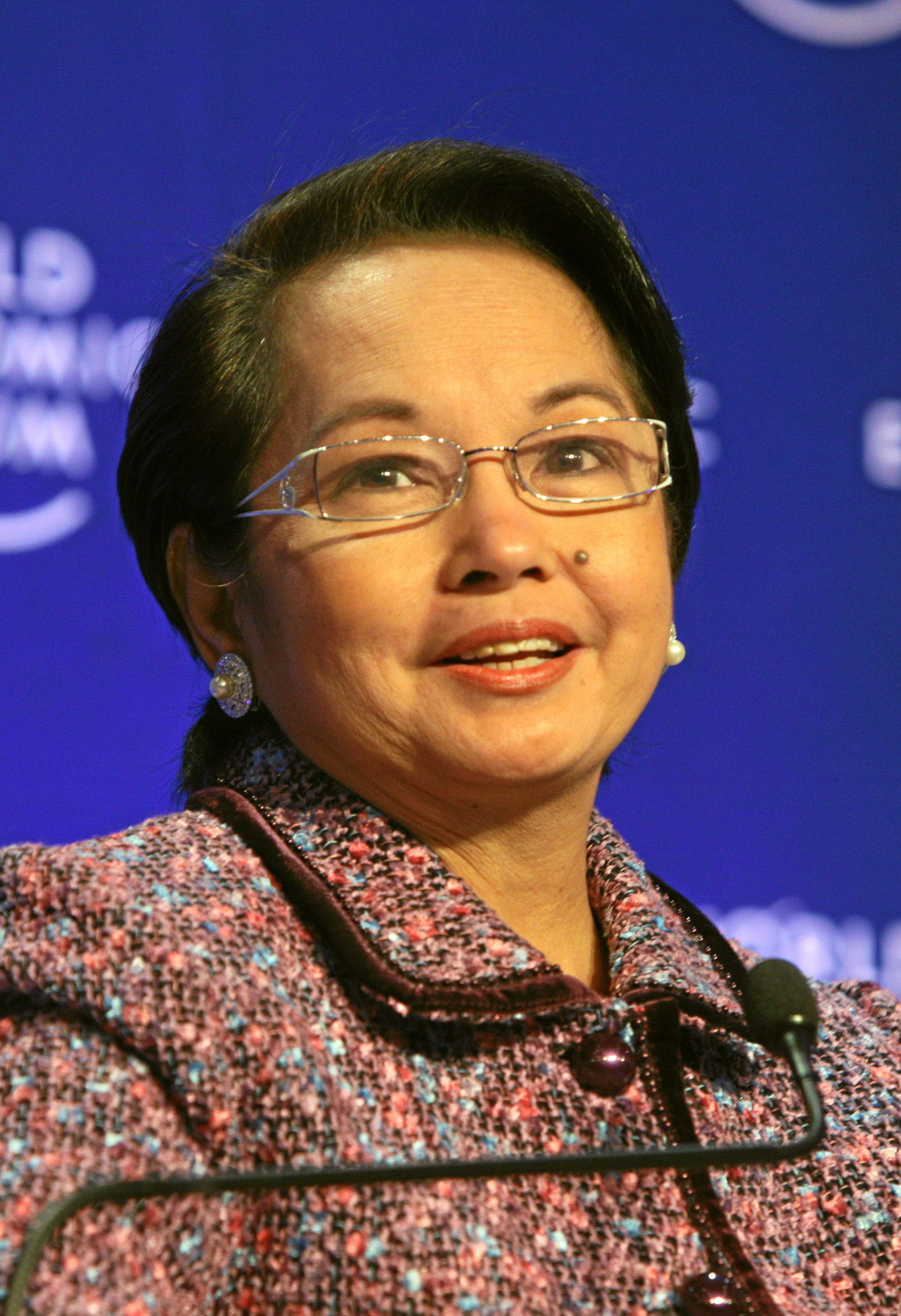
Gloria Macapagal Arroyo
President of the Philippines
(2001–2010)

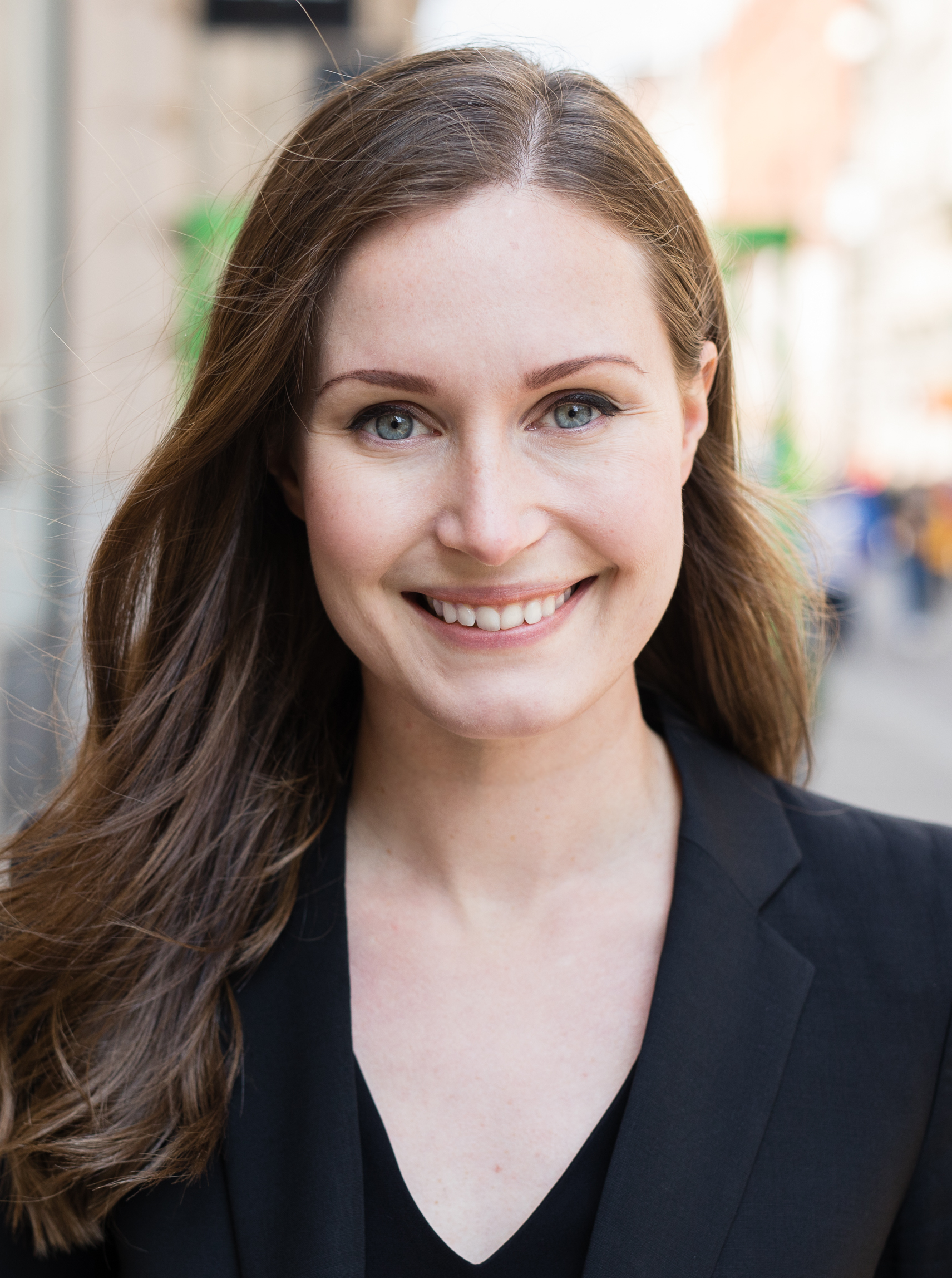
Sanna Marin
Prime Minister of Finland
(2019–2023)

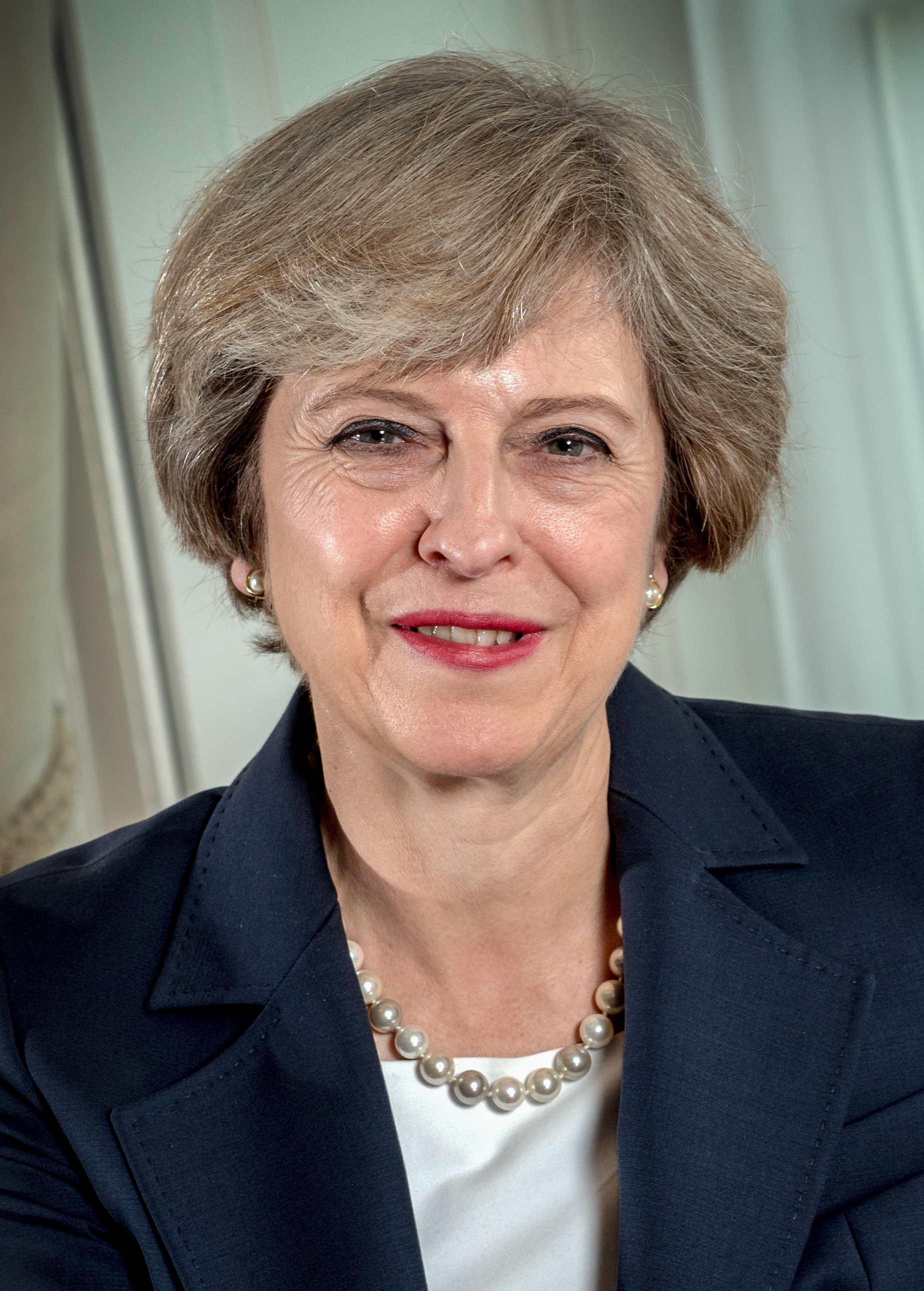
Theresa May
Prime Minister of the United Kingdom
(2016–2019)

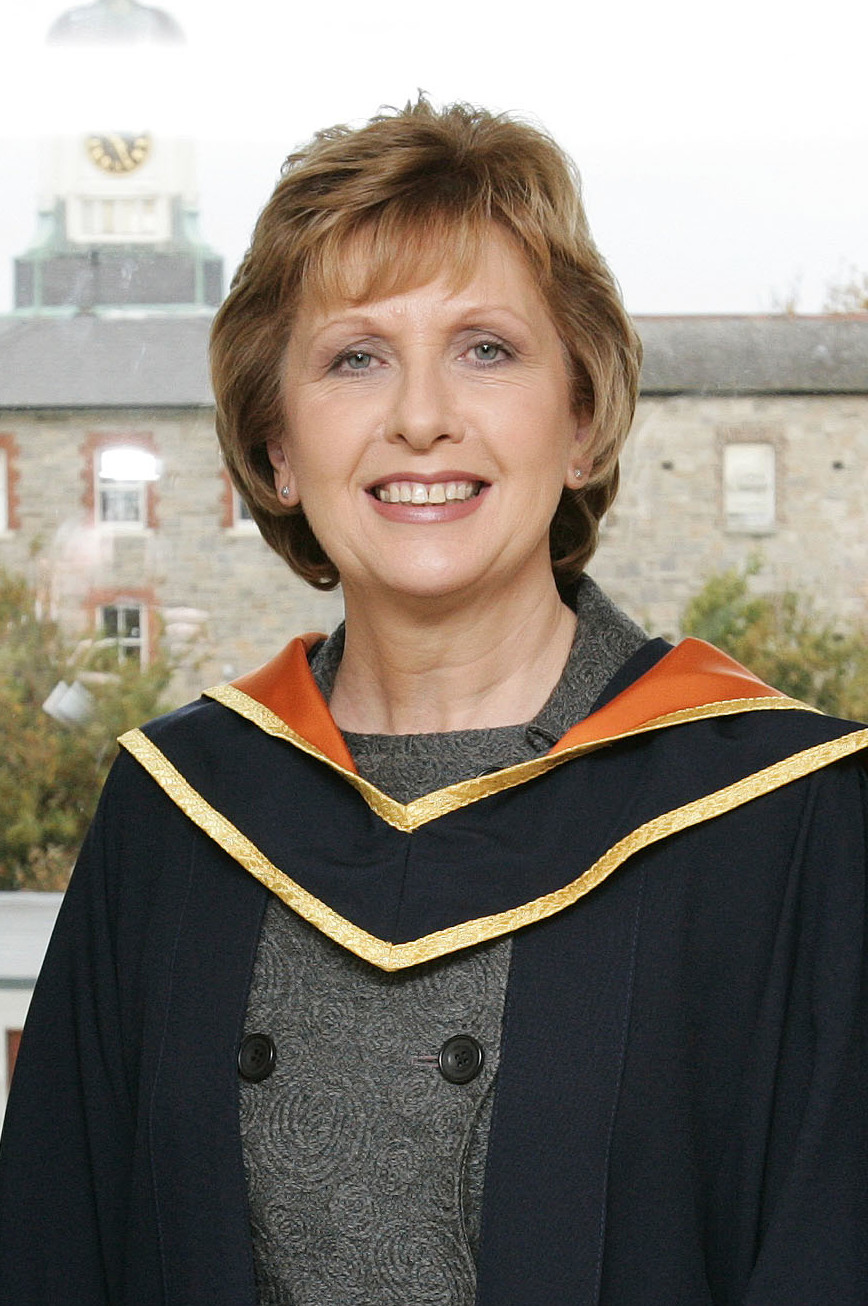
(Republic of Ireland) Mary McAleese
President of Ireland
(1997–2011)

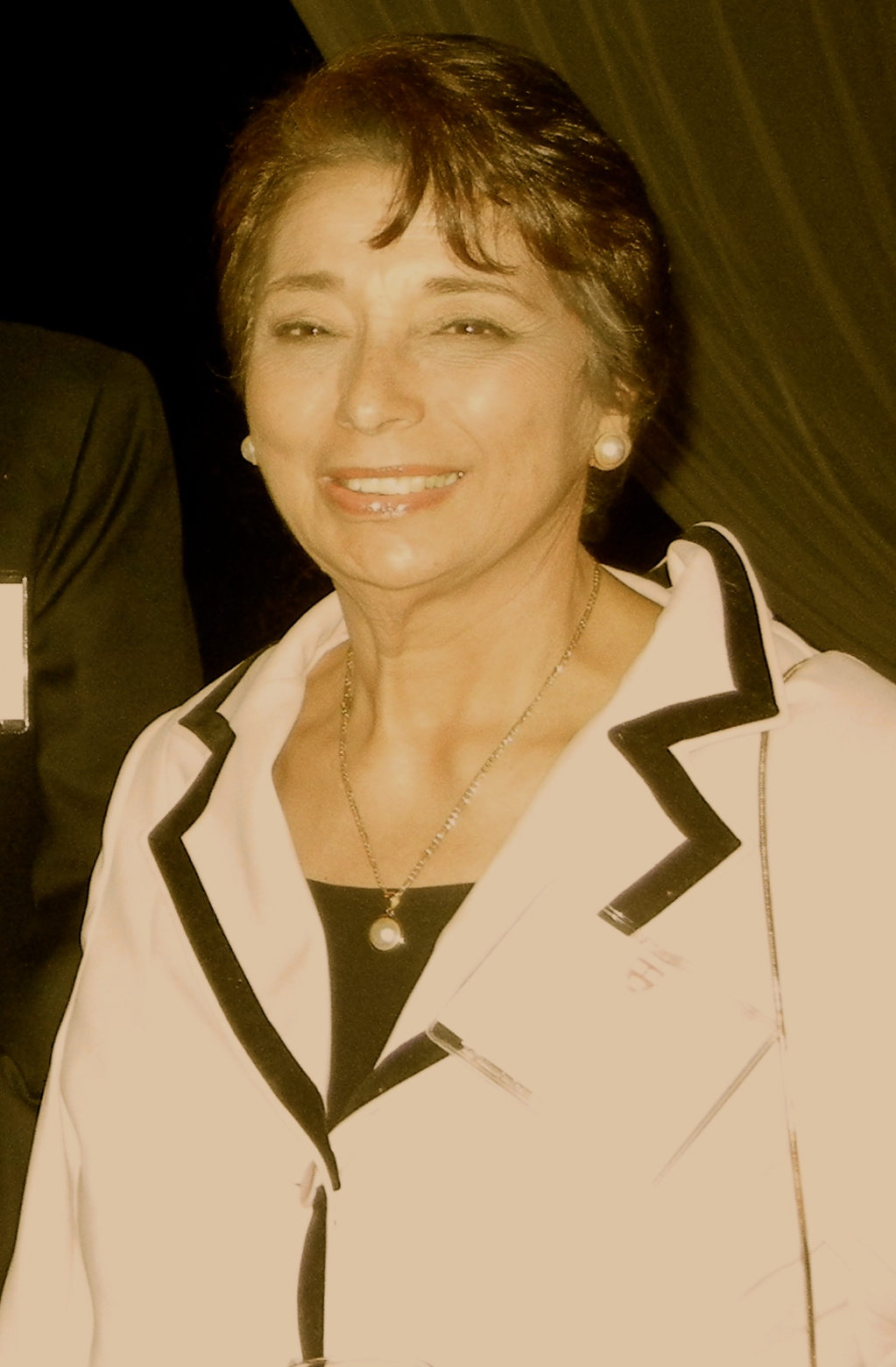
Beatriz Merino
Prime Minister of Peru
(2003)

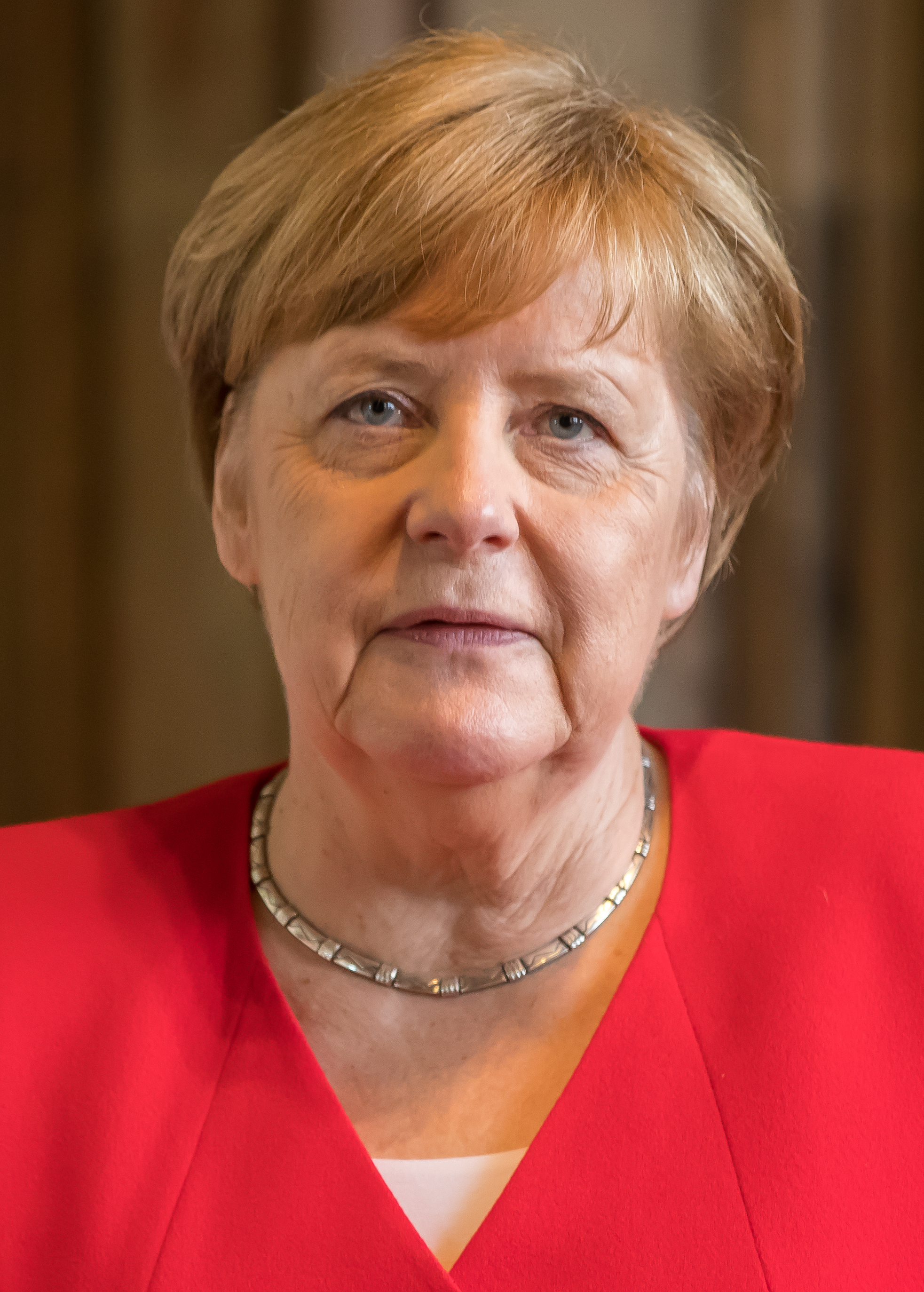
Angela Merkel
Chancellor of Germany
(2005–2021)

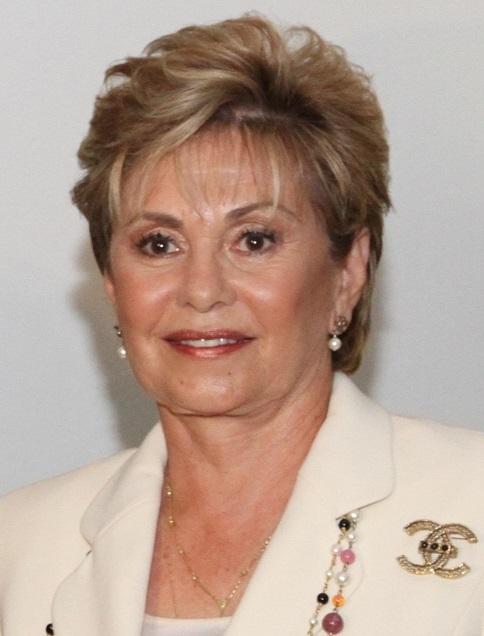
Mireya Moscoso
President of Panama
(1999–2004)

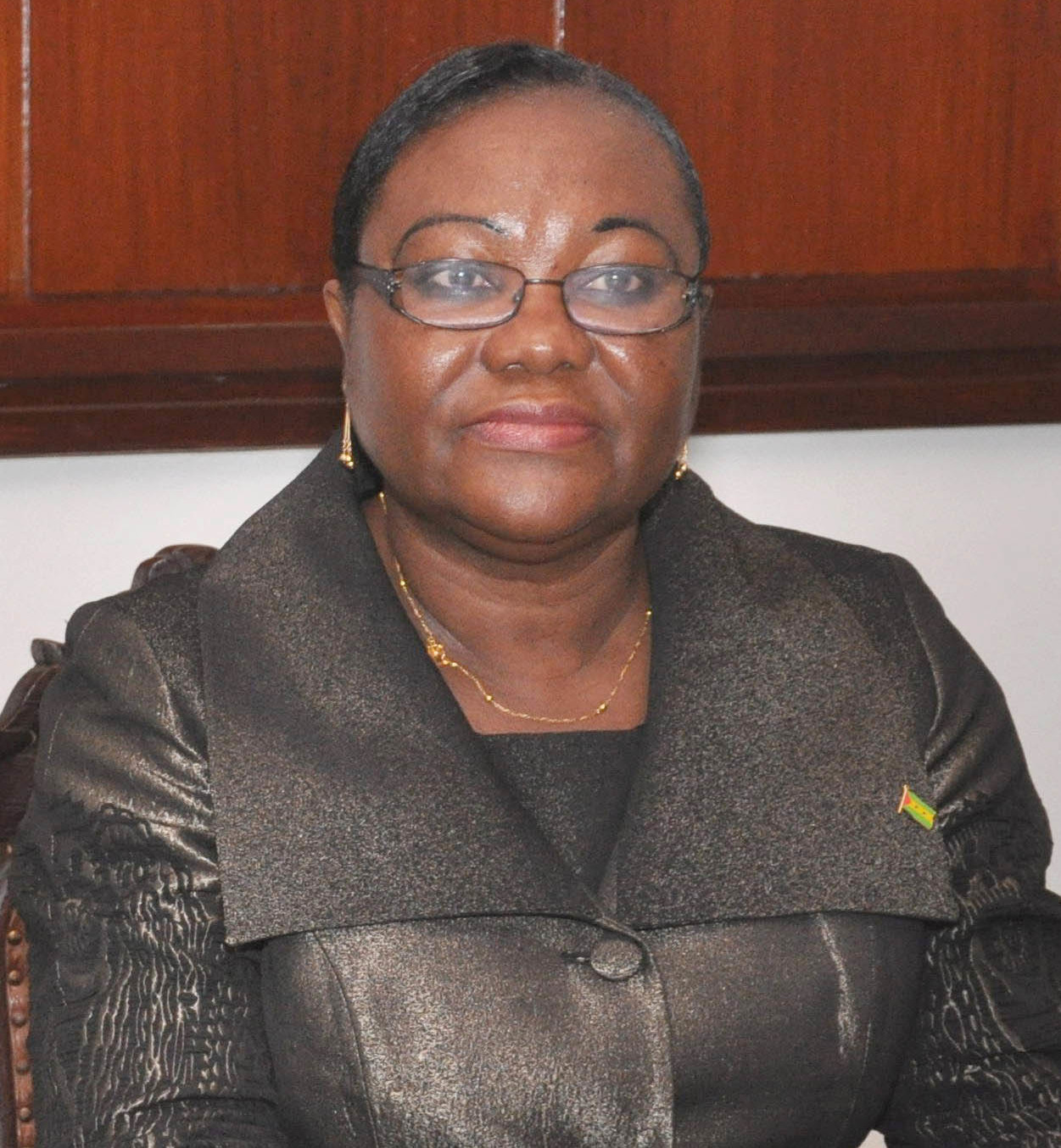
Maria das Neves
Prime Minister of São Tomé and Príncipe
(2002–2004)

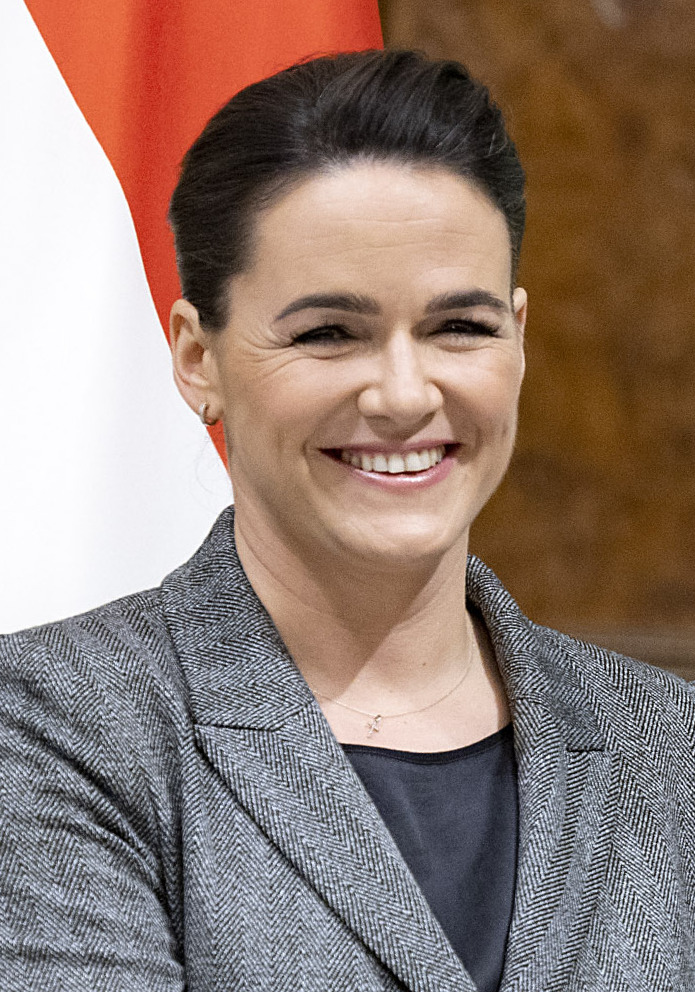
Katalin Novák
President of Hungary
(2022–2024)

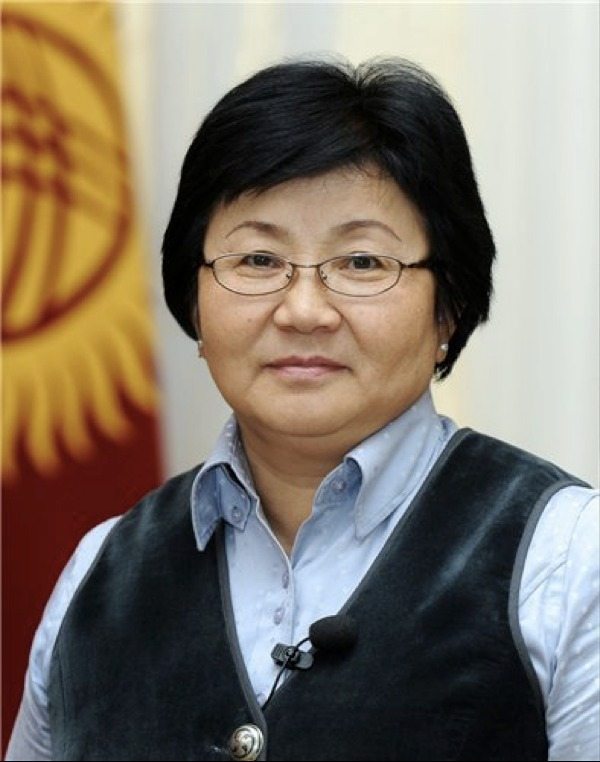
Roza Otunbayeva
President of Kyrgyzstan
(2010–2011)

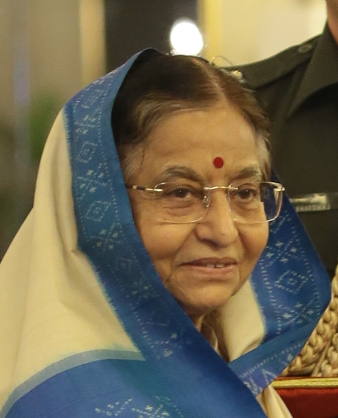
Pratibha Patil
President of India
(2007–2012)

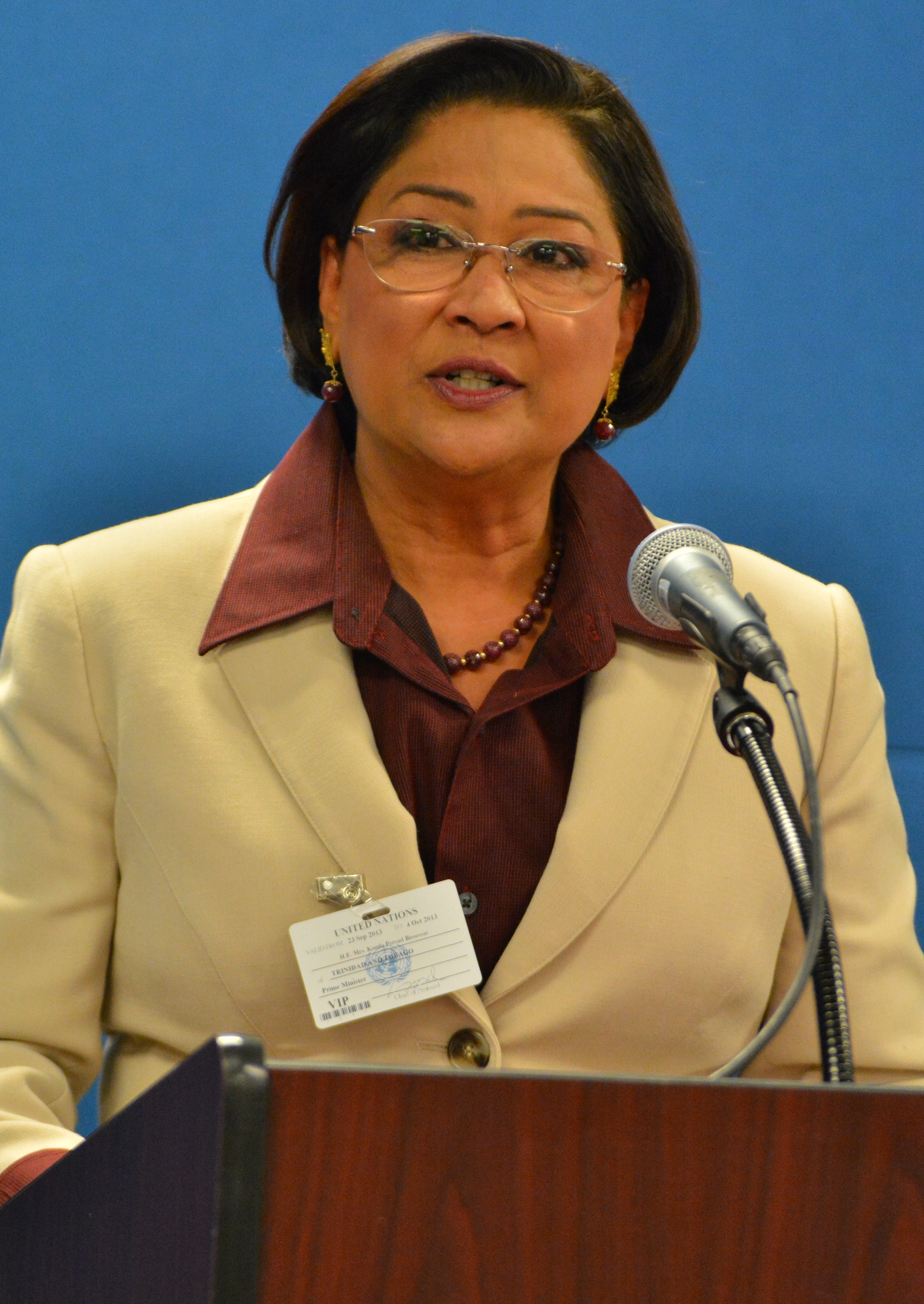
Kamla Persad-Bissessar
Prime Minister of Trinidad and Tobago
(2010–2015)

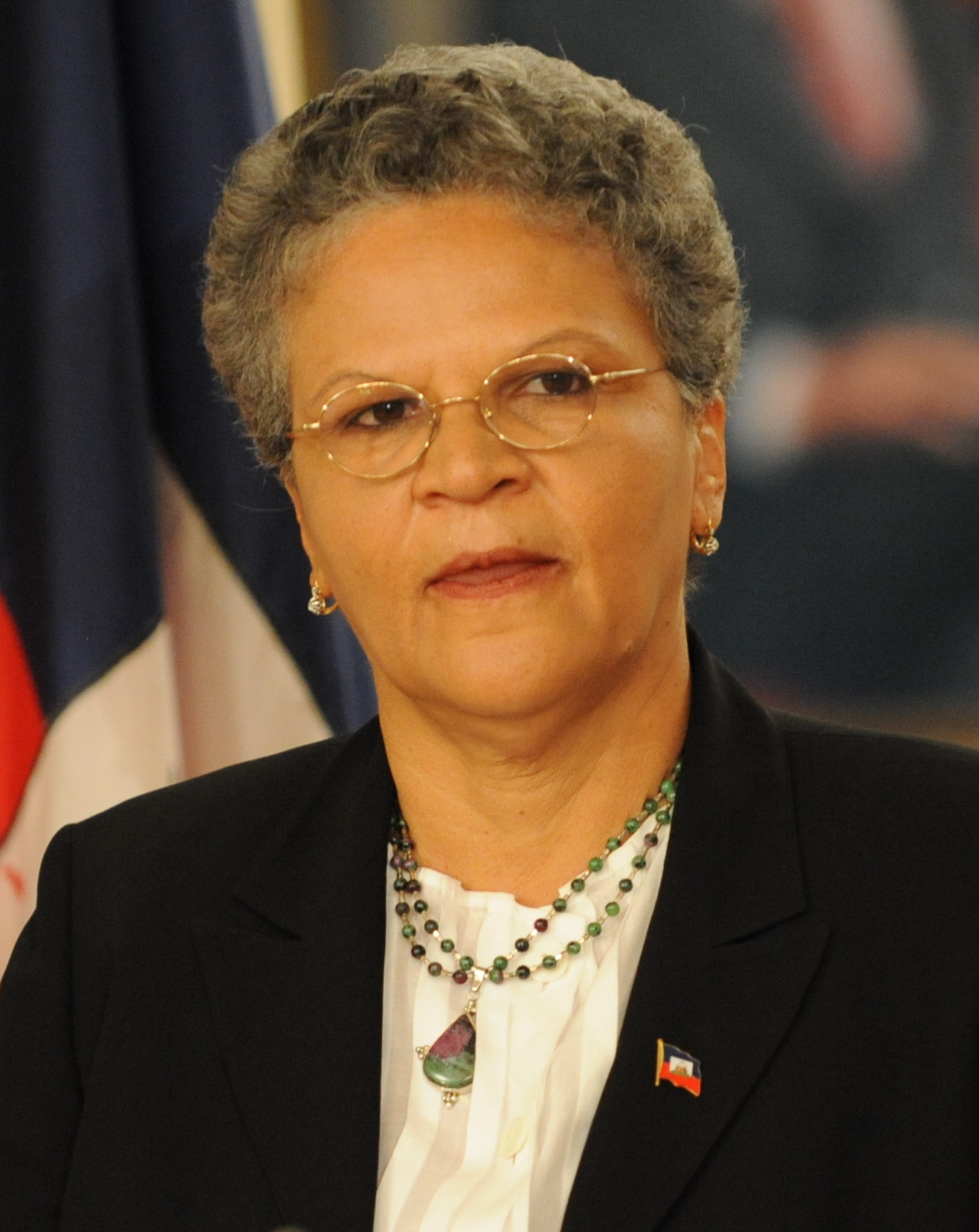
Michèle Pierre-Louis
Prime Minister of Haiti
(2008–2009)

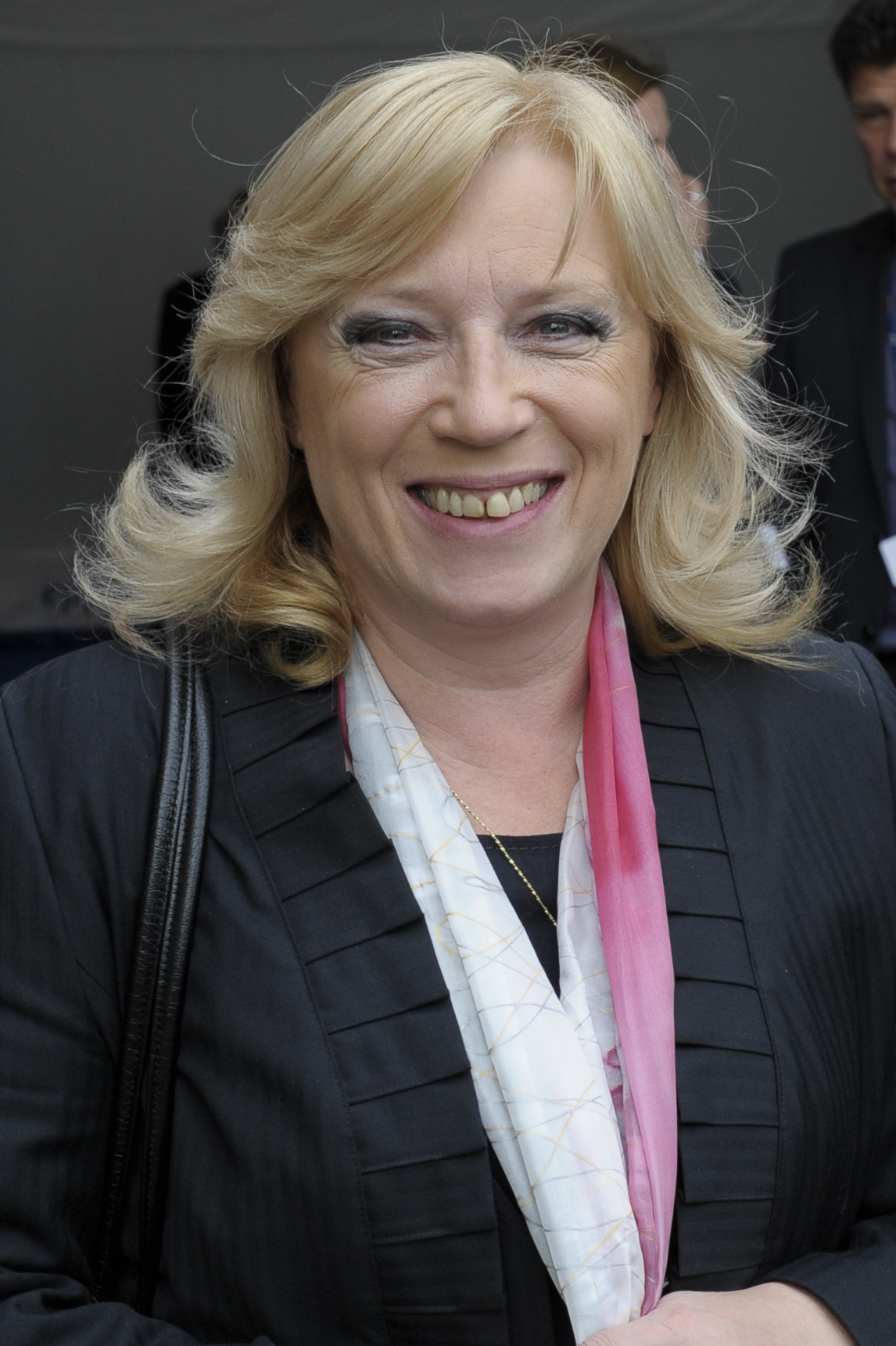
Iveta Radičová
Prime Minister of Slovakia
(2010–2012)

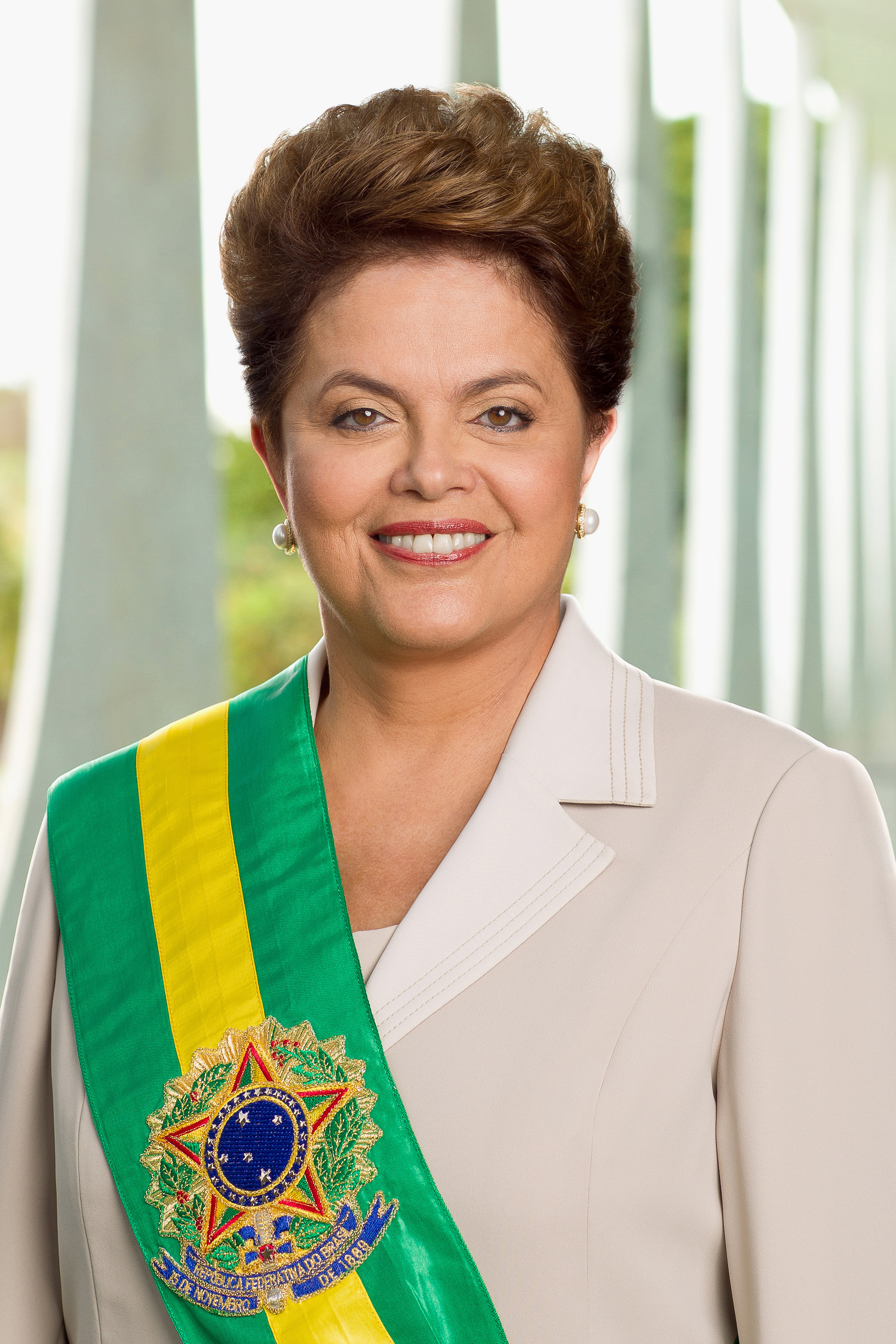
Dilma Rousseff
President of Brazil
(2011–2016)

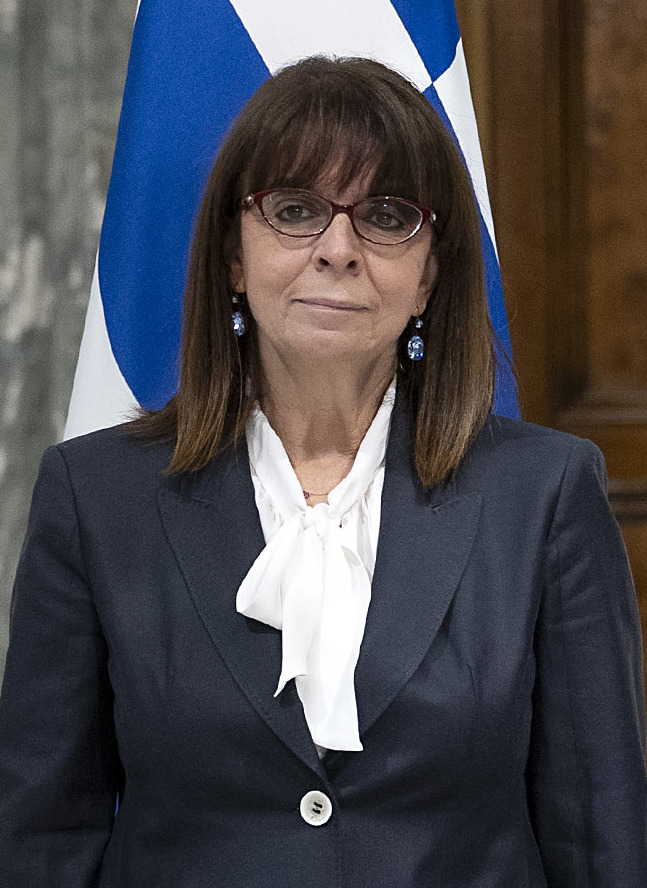
Katerina Sakellaropoulou
President of Greece
(2020–2025)

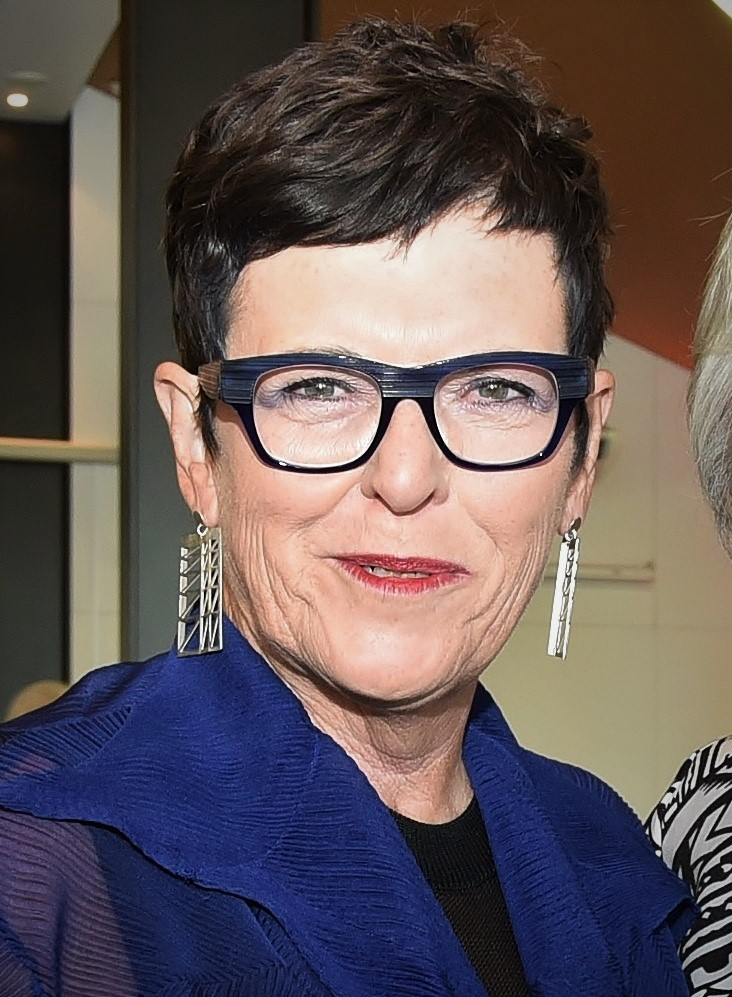
Jenny Shipley
Prime Minister of New Zealand
(1997–1999)

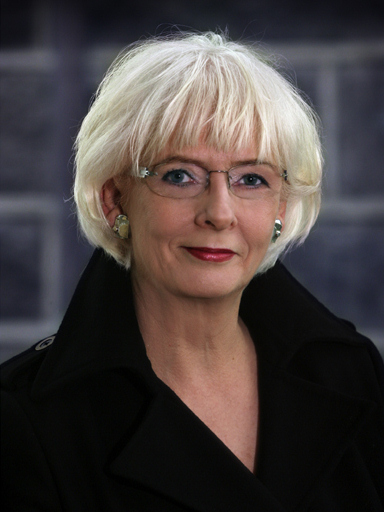
Jóhanna Sigurðardóttir
Prime Minister of Iceland
(2009–2013)

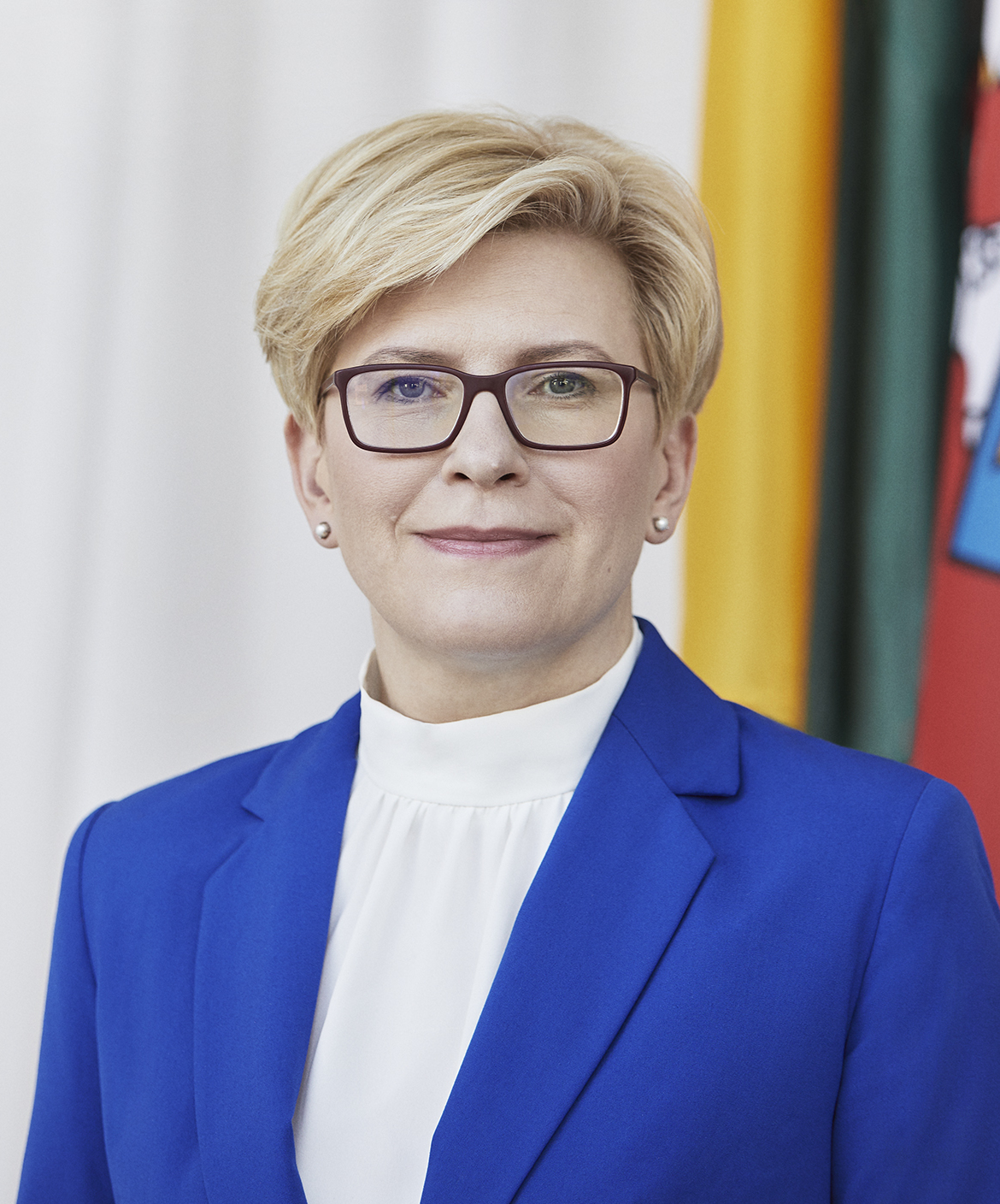
Ingrida Šimonytė
Prime Minister of Lithuania
(2020–2024)

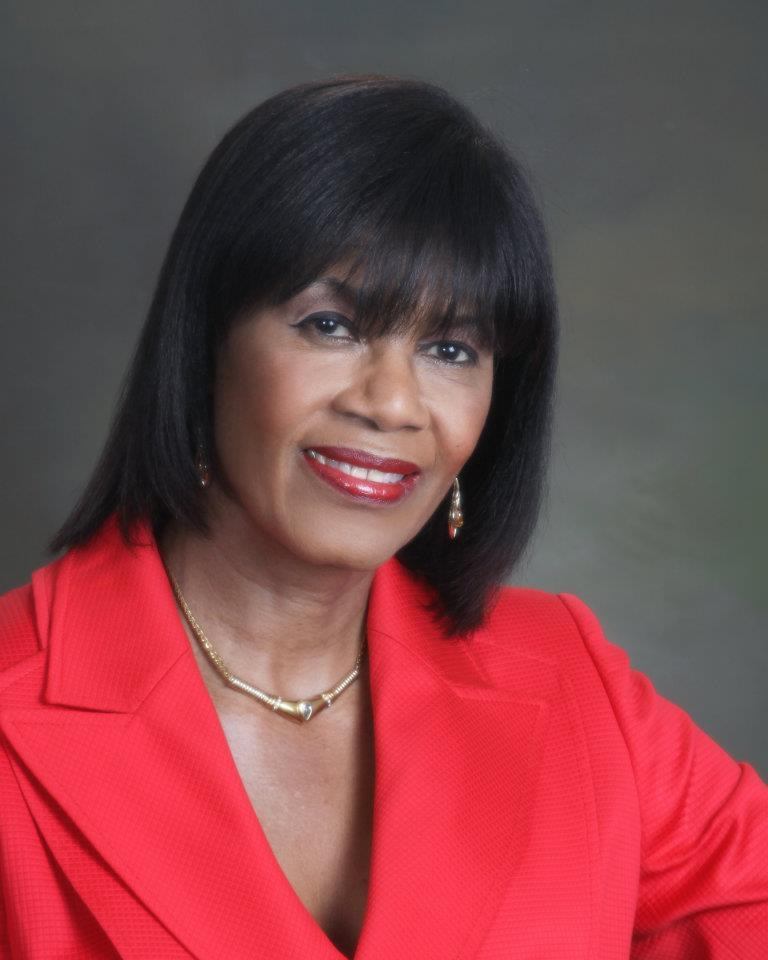
Portia Simpson-Miller
Prime Minister of Jamaica
(2006–2007, 2012–2016)

Jennifer M. Smith
Premier of Bermuda
(1998–2003)

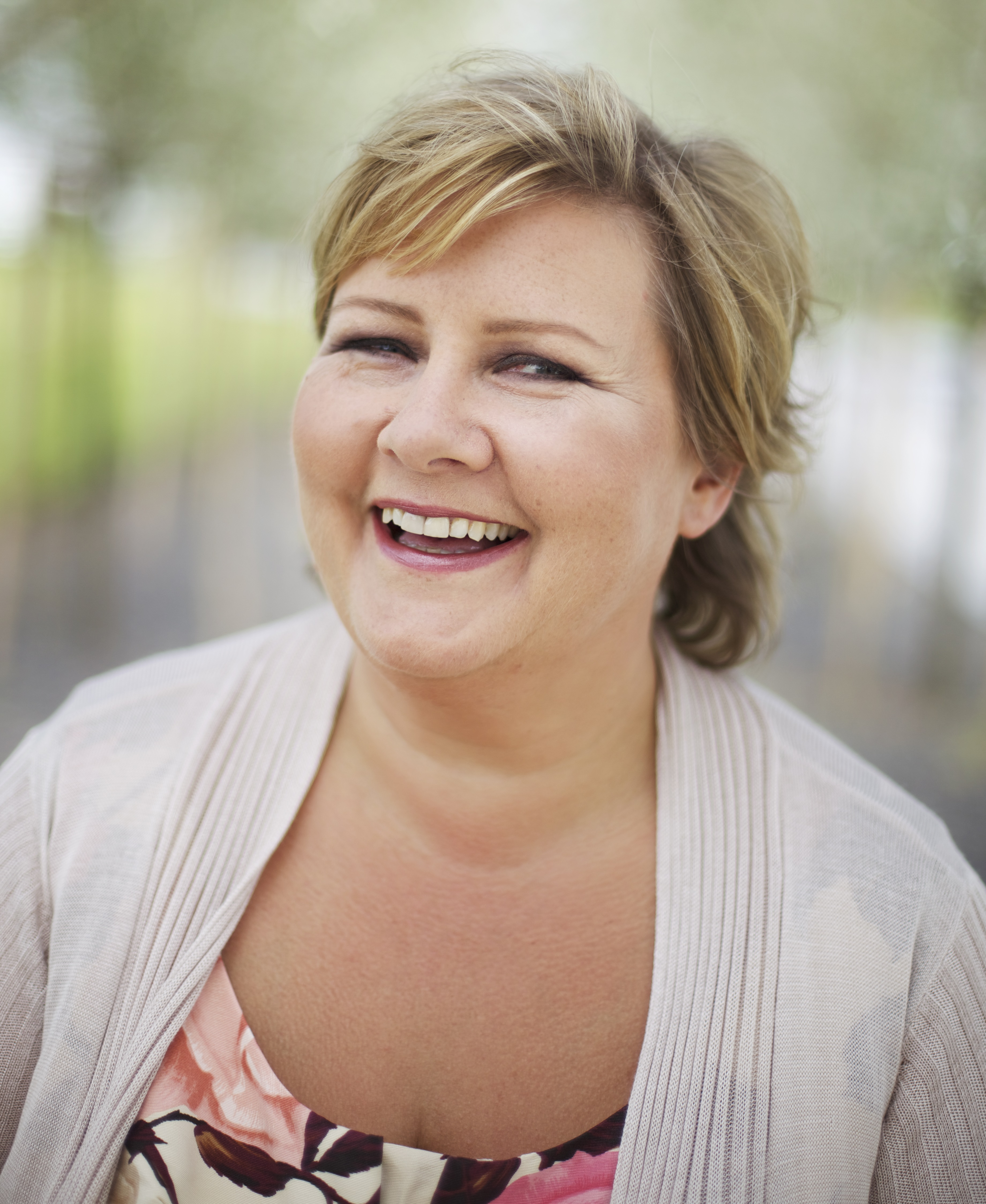
Erna Solberg
Prime Minister of Norway
(2013–2021)

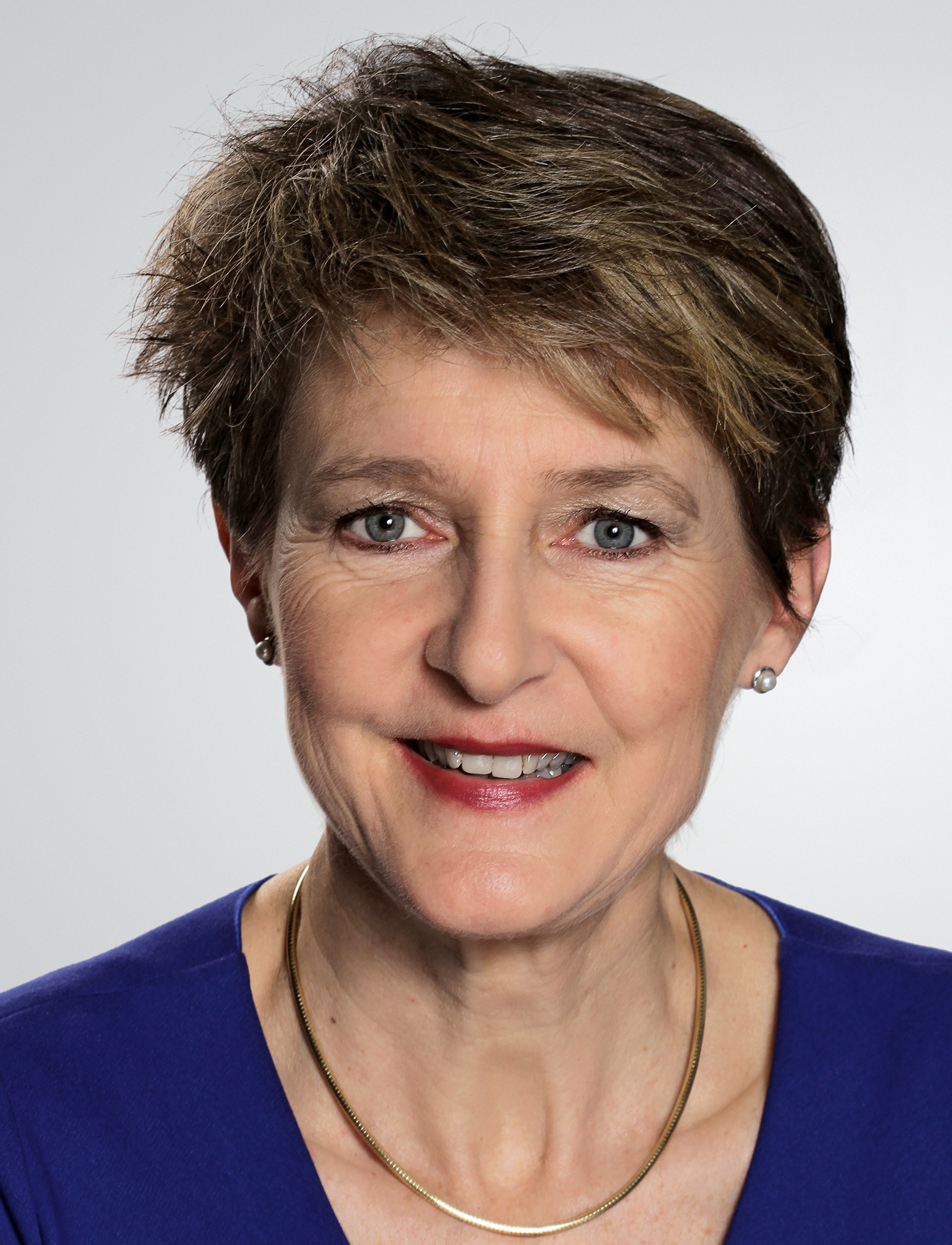
Simonetta Sommaruga
President of Switzerland
(2015, 2020)

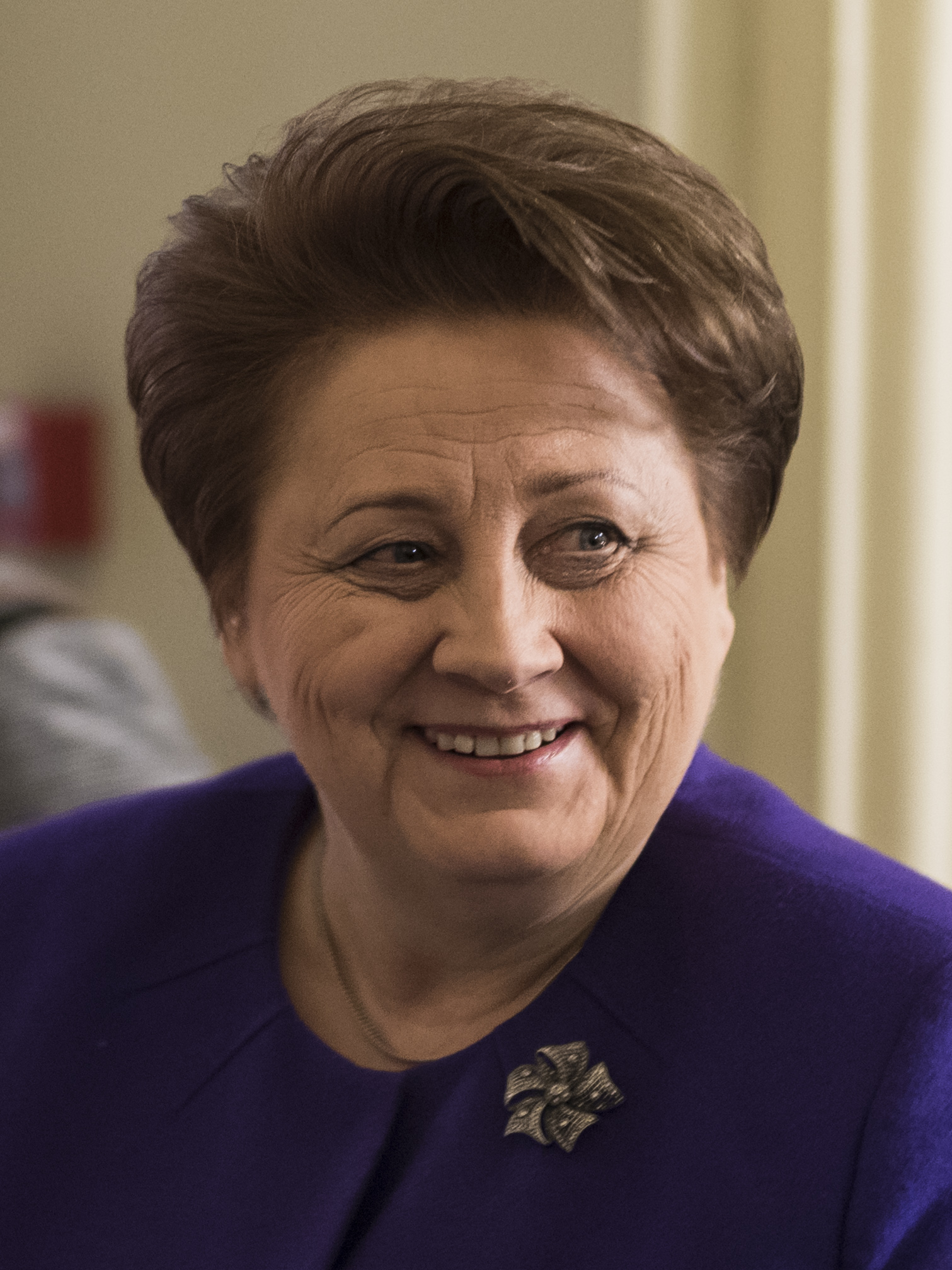
Laimdota Straujuma
Prime Minister of Latvia
(2014–2016)

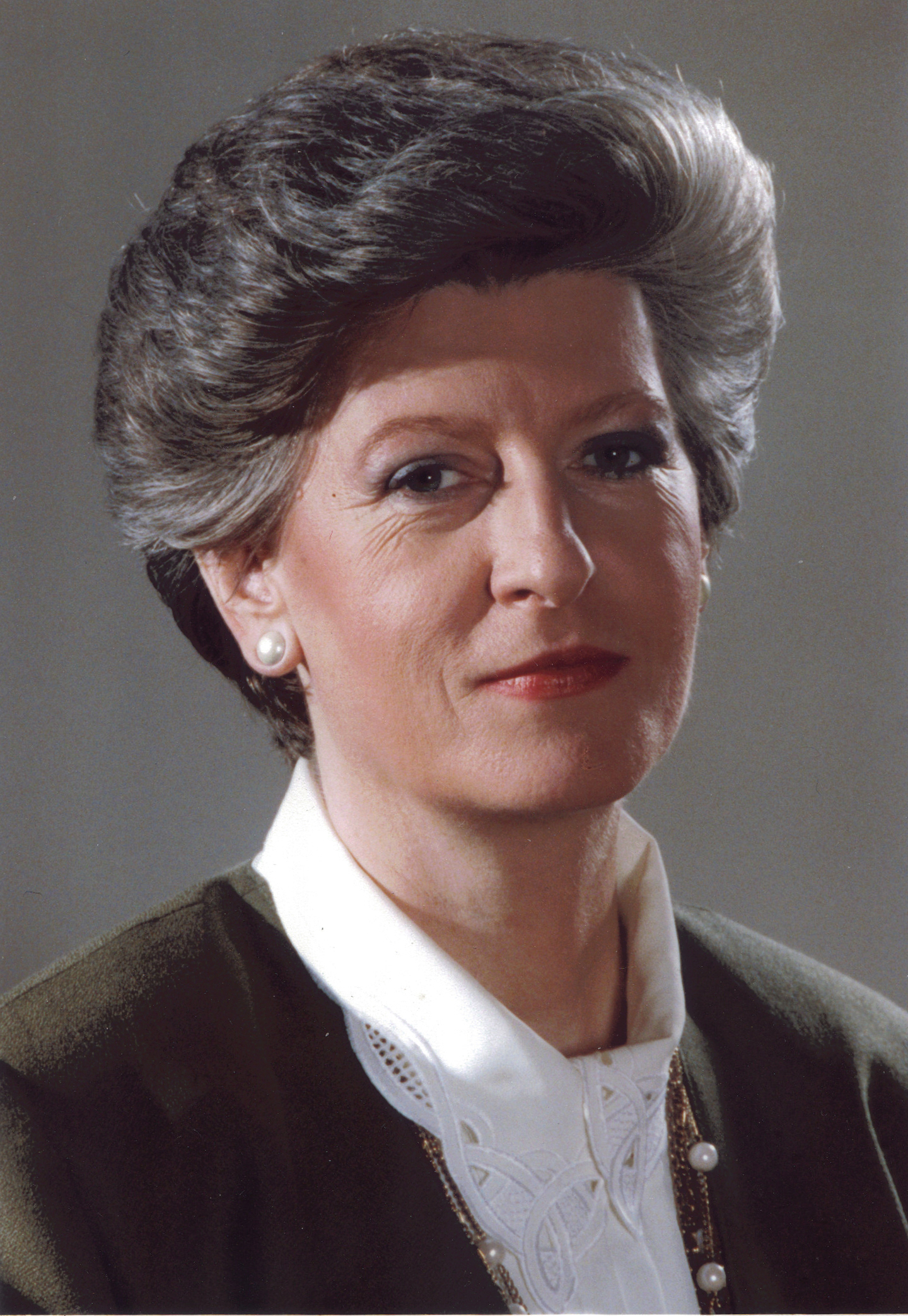
Hanna Suchocka
Prime Minister of Poland
(1992–1993)

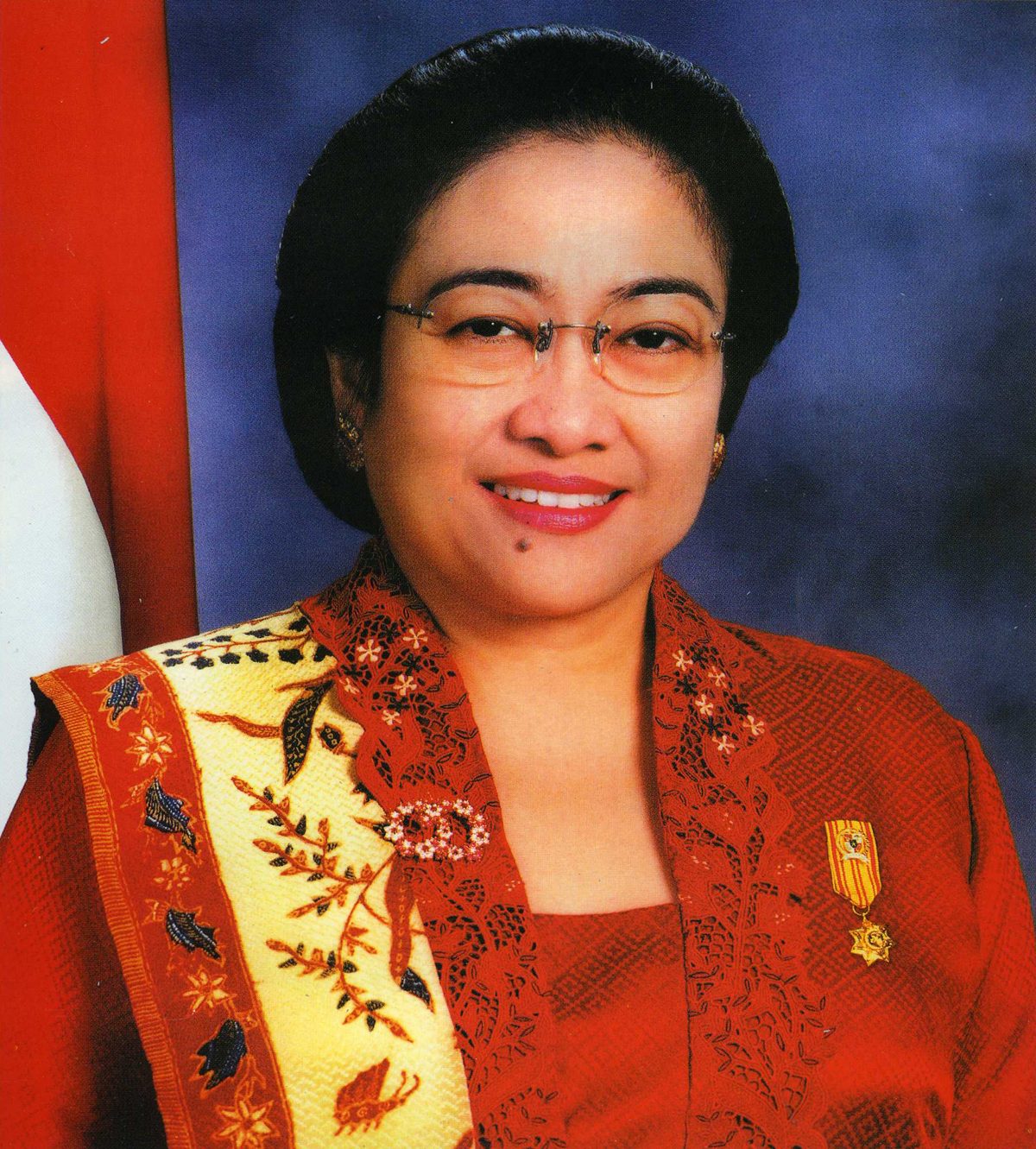
Megawati Sukarnoputri
President of Indonesia
(2001–2004)

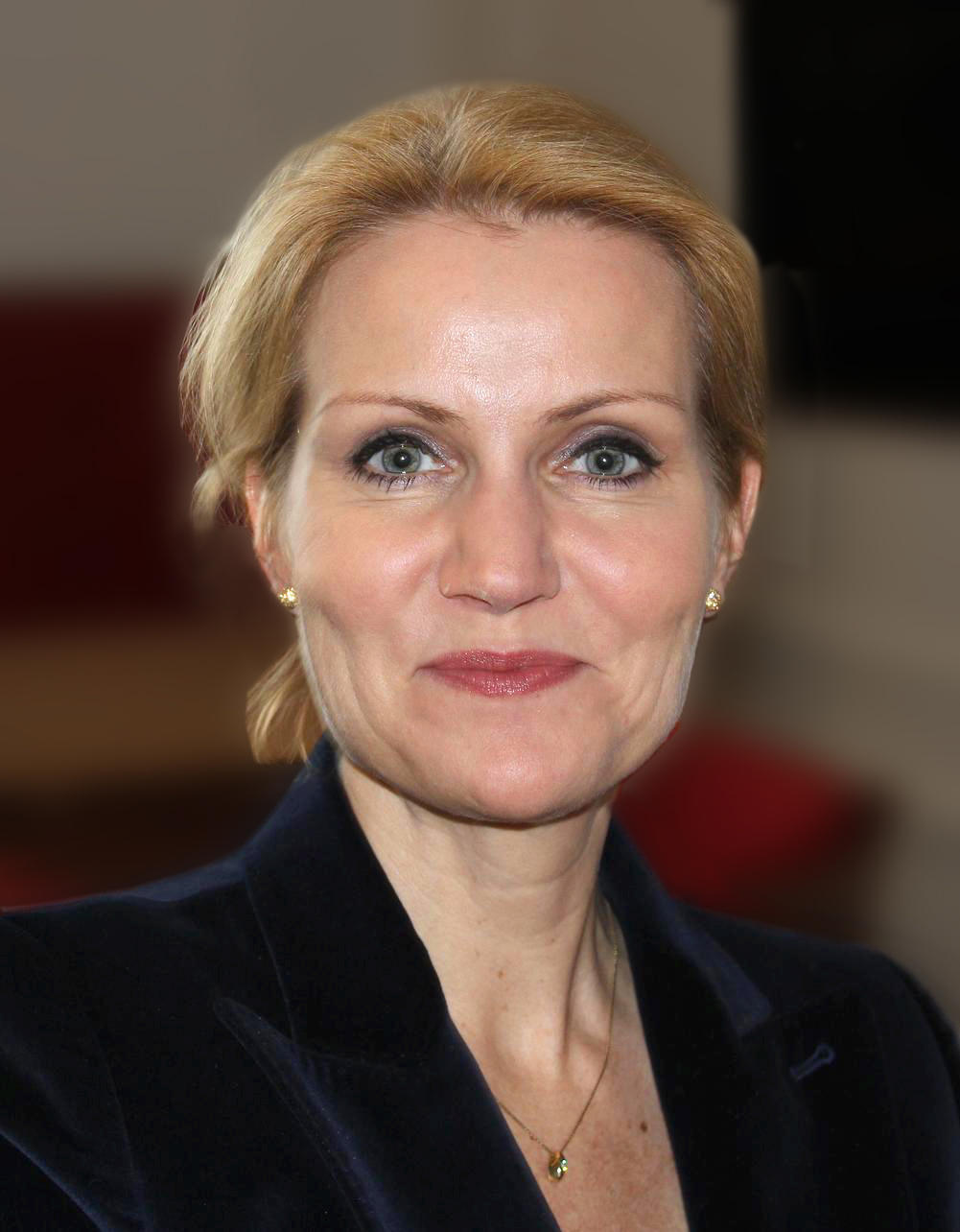
Helle Thorning-Schmidt
Prime Minister of Denmark
(2011–2015)

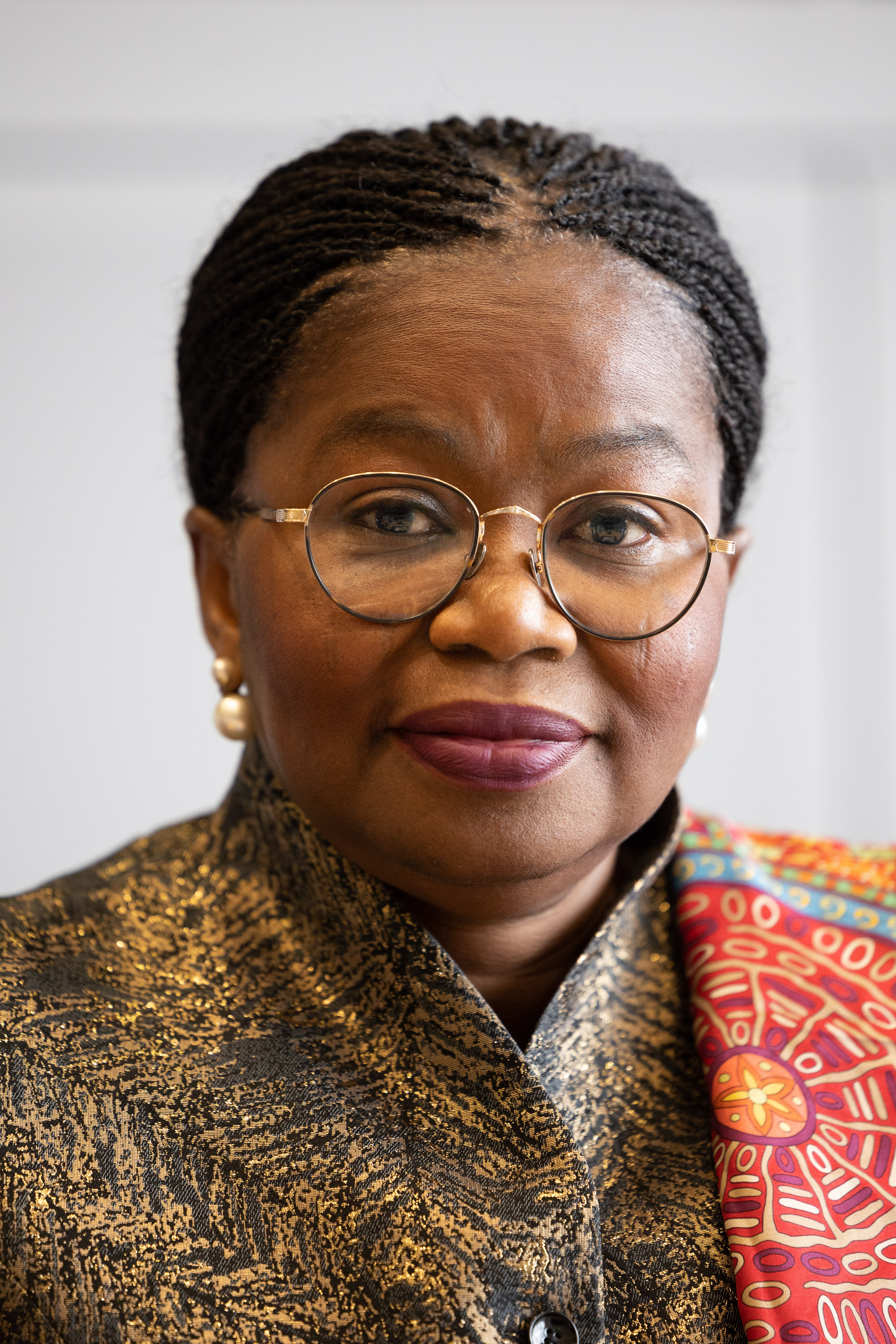
Victoire Tomégah-Dogbé
Prime Minister of Togo
(2020–2025)

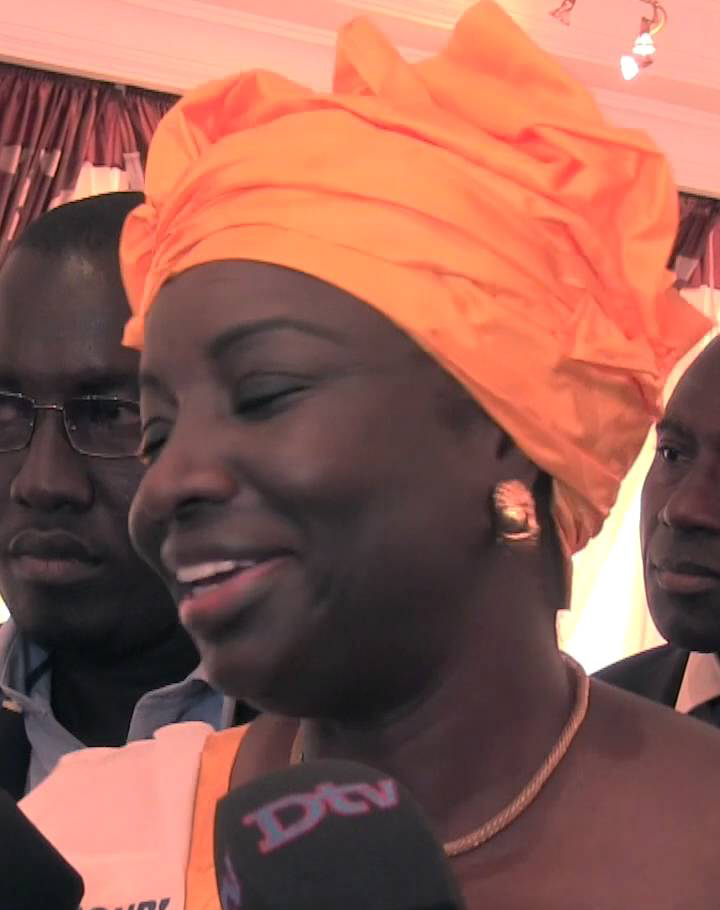
Aminata Touré
Prime Minister of Senegal
(2013–2014)

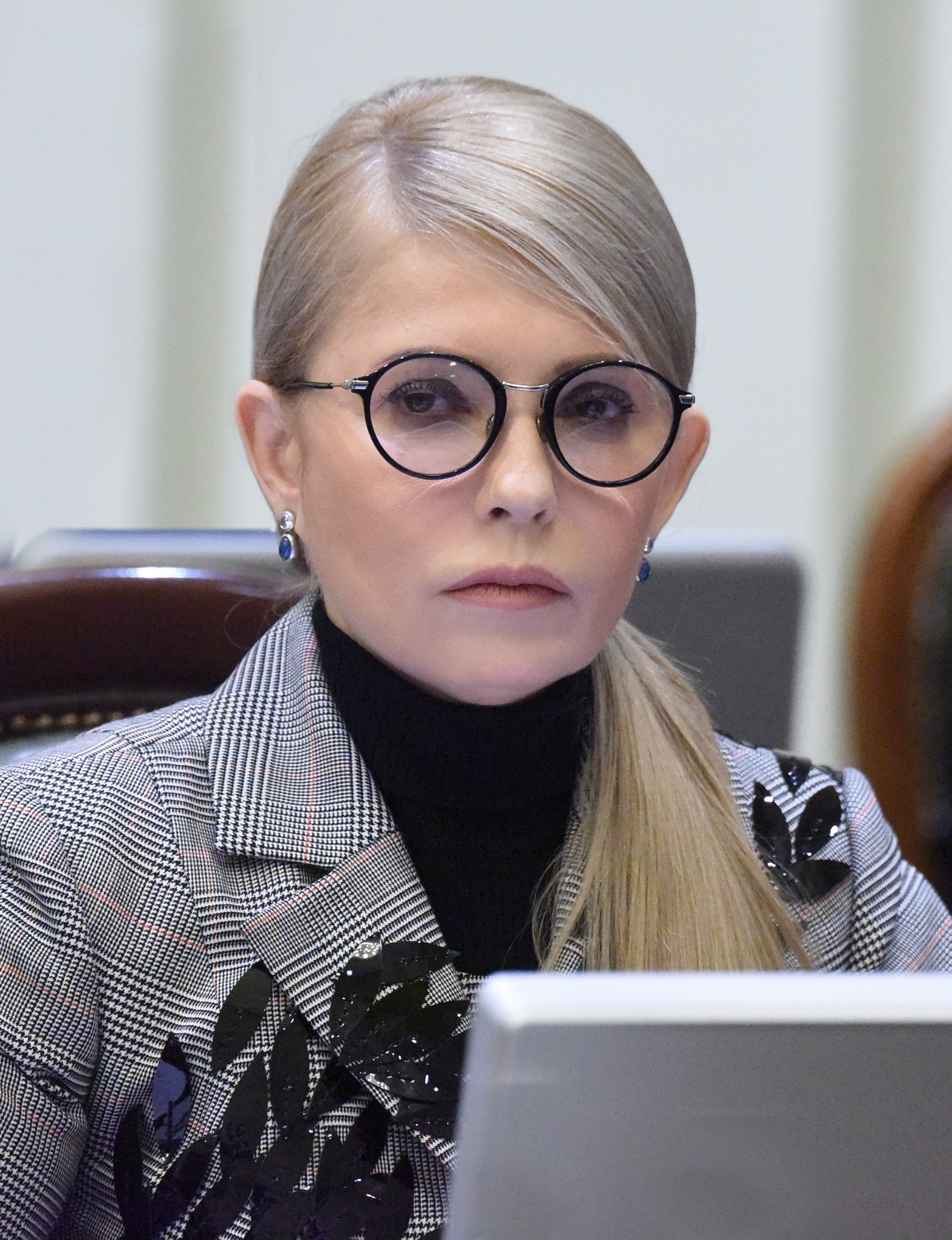
Yulia Tymoshenko
Prime Minister of Ukraine
(2005, 2007–2010)

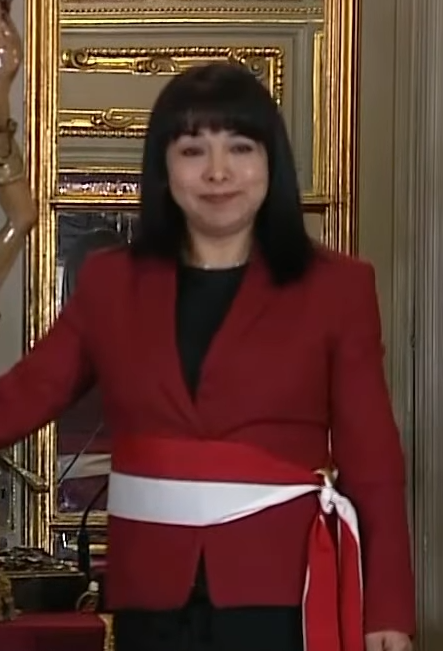
Mirtha Vásquez
Prime Minister of Peru
(2021–2022)

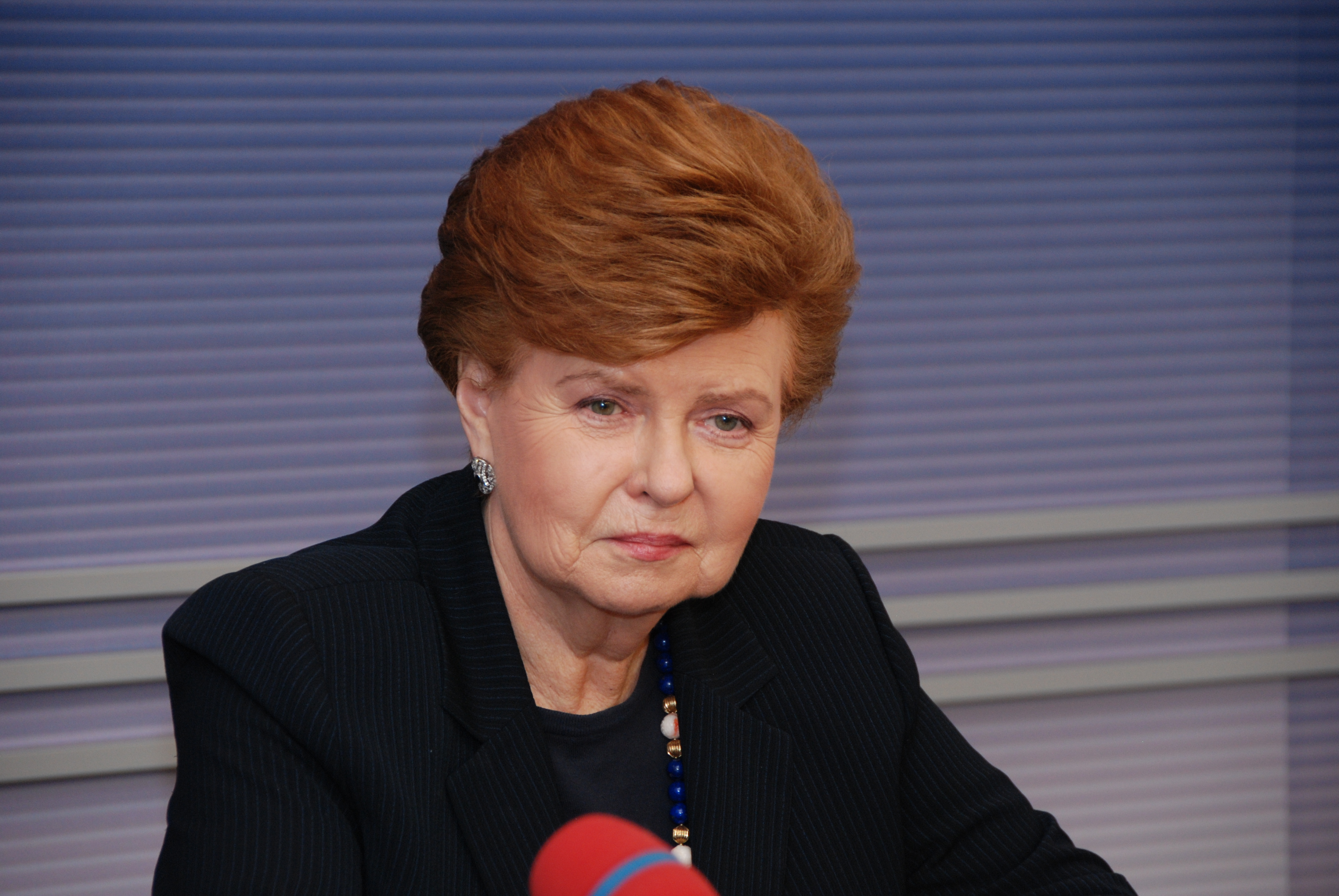
Vaira Vīķe-Freiberga
President of Latvia
(1999–2007)

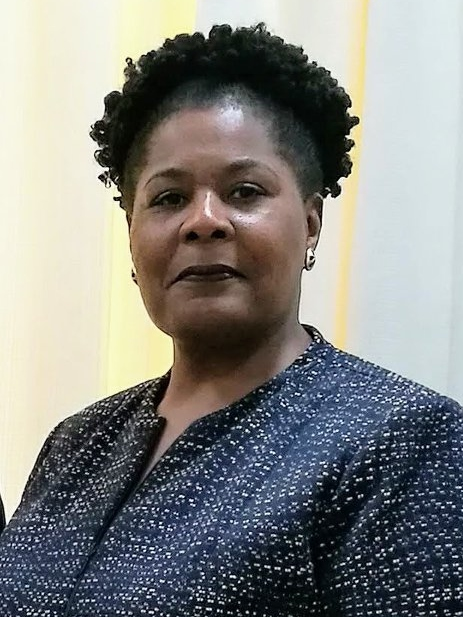
Paula-Mae Weekes
President of Trinidad and Tobago
(2018–2023)

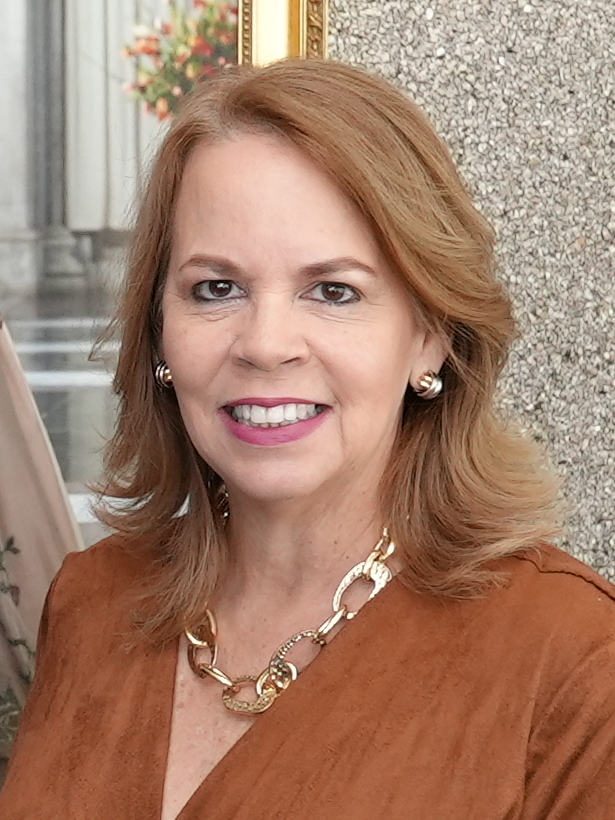
Evelyn Wever-Croes
Prime Minister of Aruba
(2017–2025)

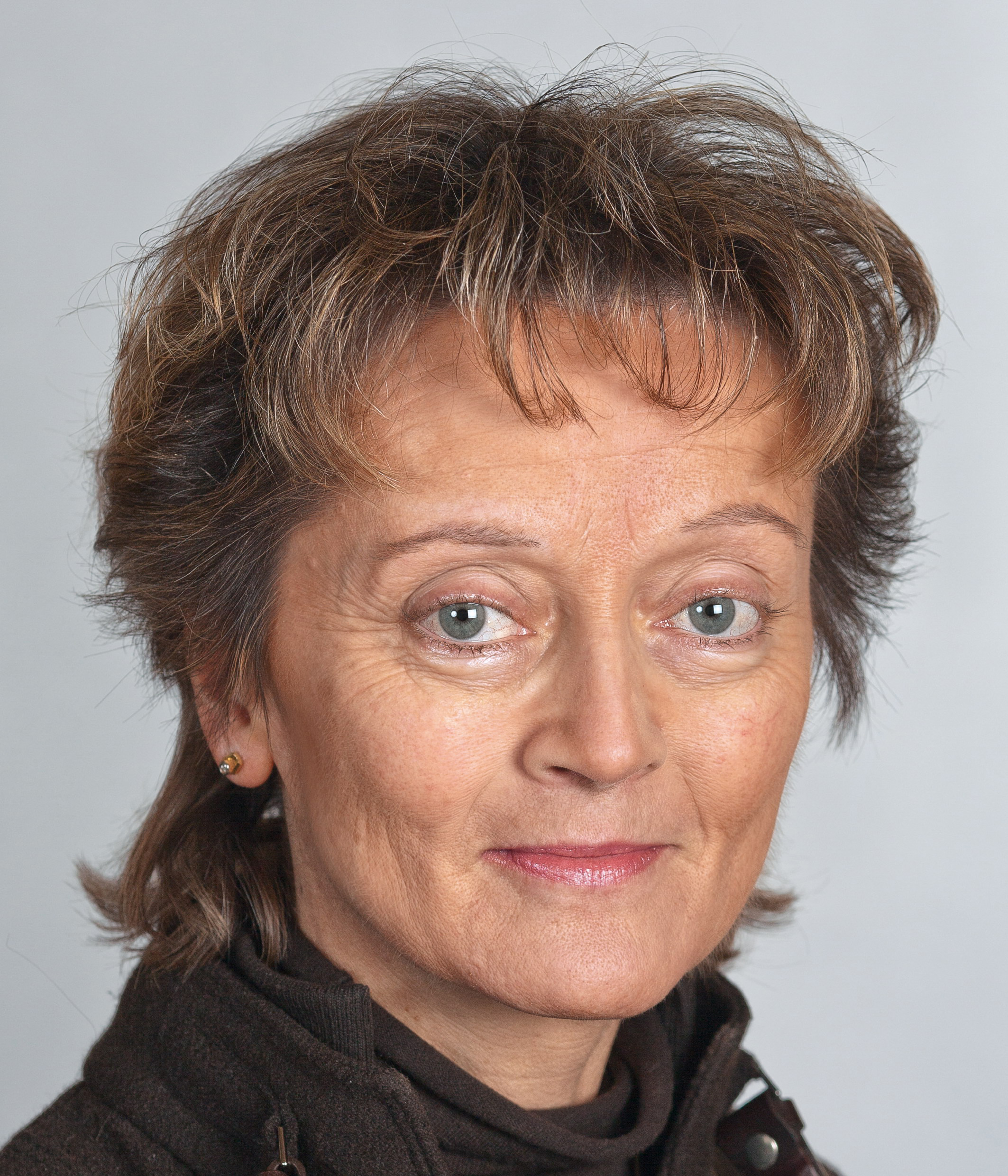
Eveline Widmer-Schlumpf
President of Switzerland
(2012)

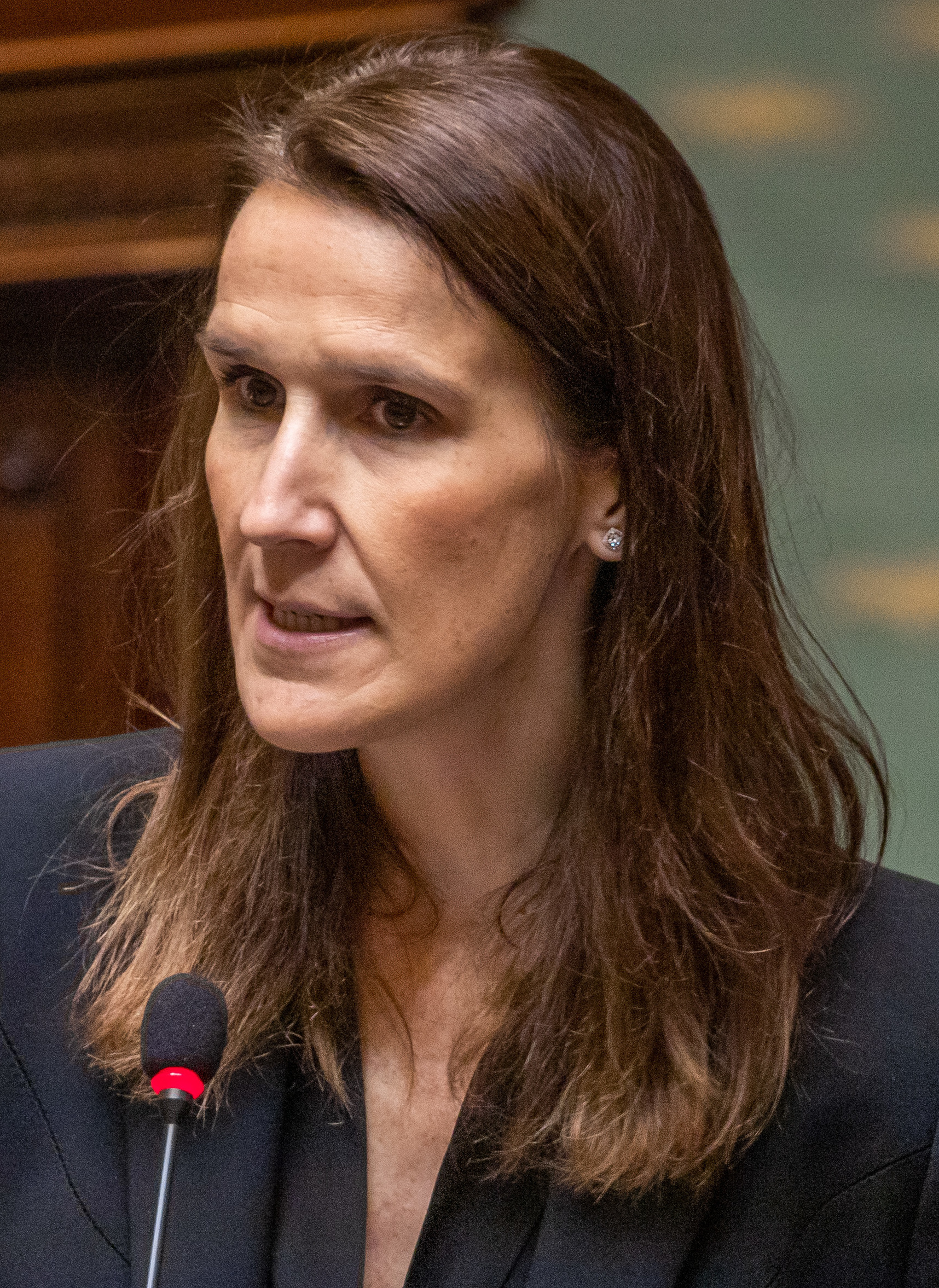
Sophie Wilmès
Prime Minister of Belgium
(2019–2020)

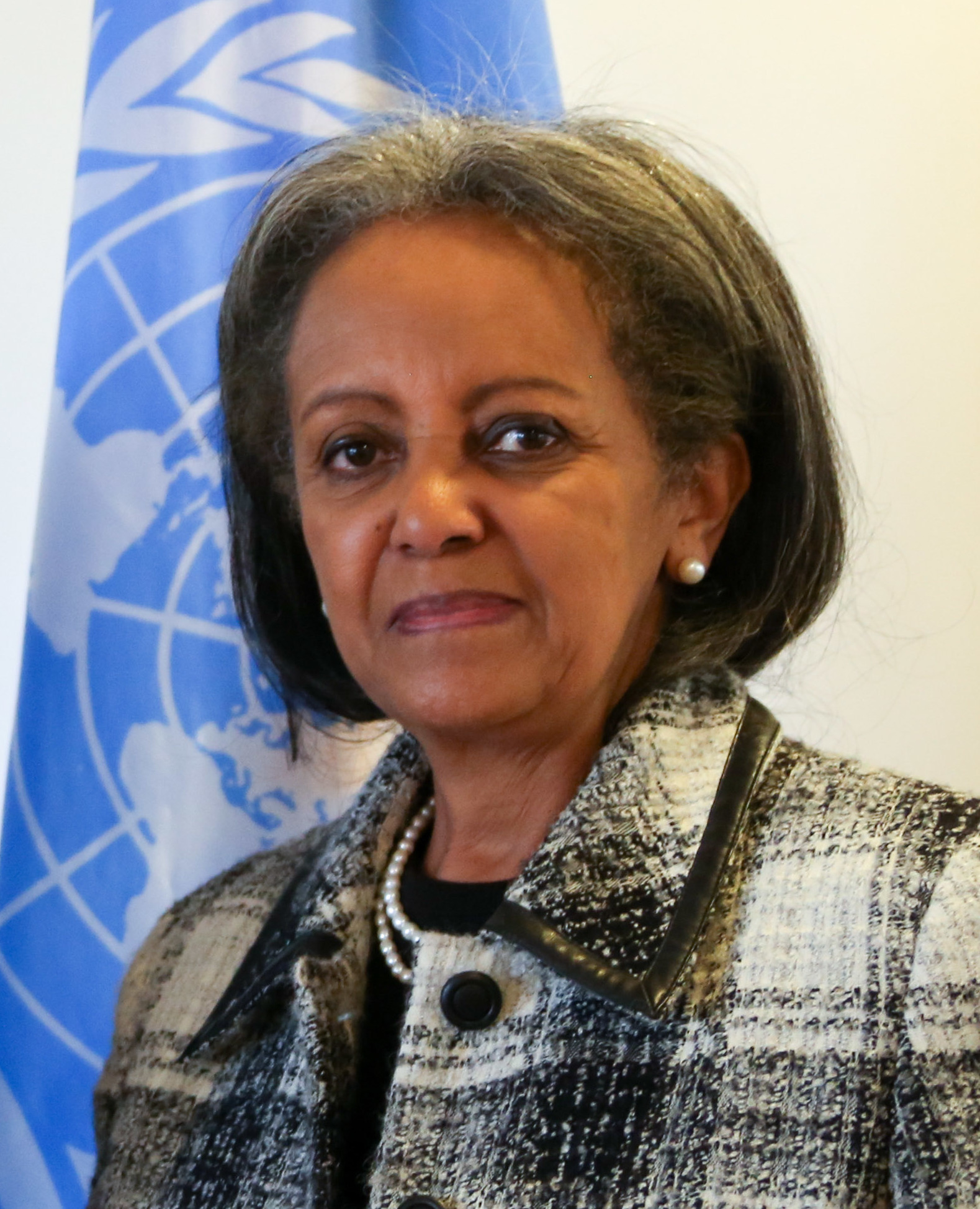
Sahle-Work Zewde
President of Ethiopia
(2018–2024)

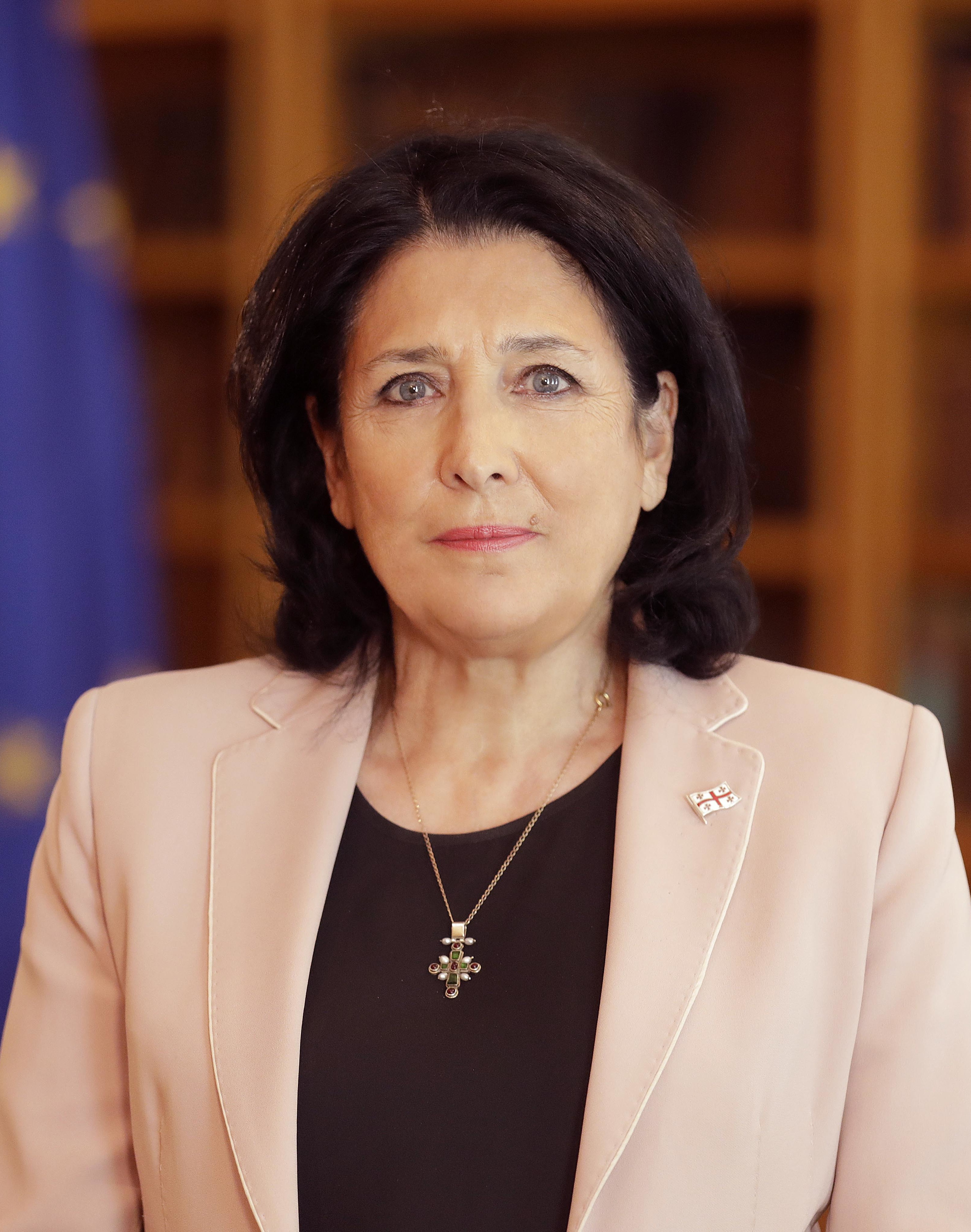
(Georgia (country)) Salome Zourabichvili
President of Georgia
(2018–2024)

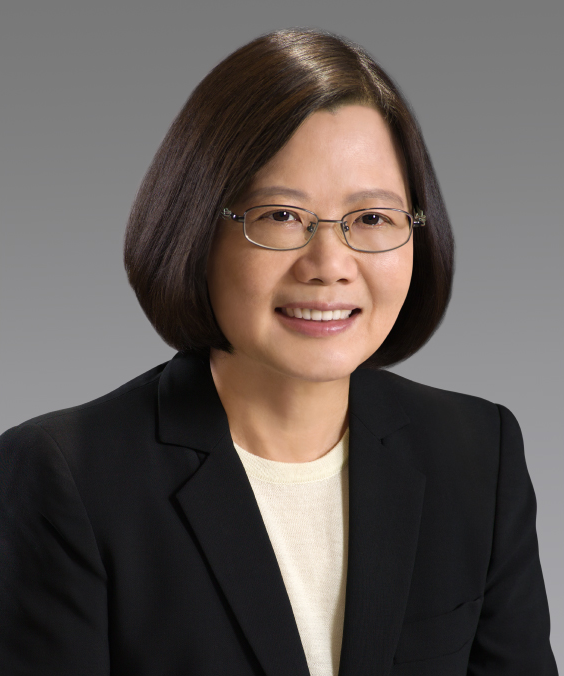
(Taiwan) Tsai Ing-wen
President of the Republic of China
(2016–2024)

=== Deceased members ===
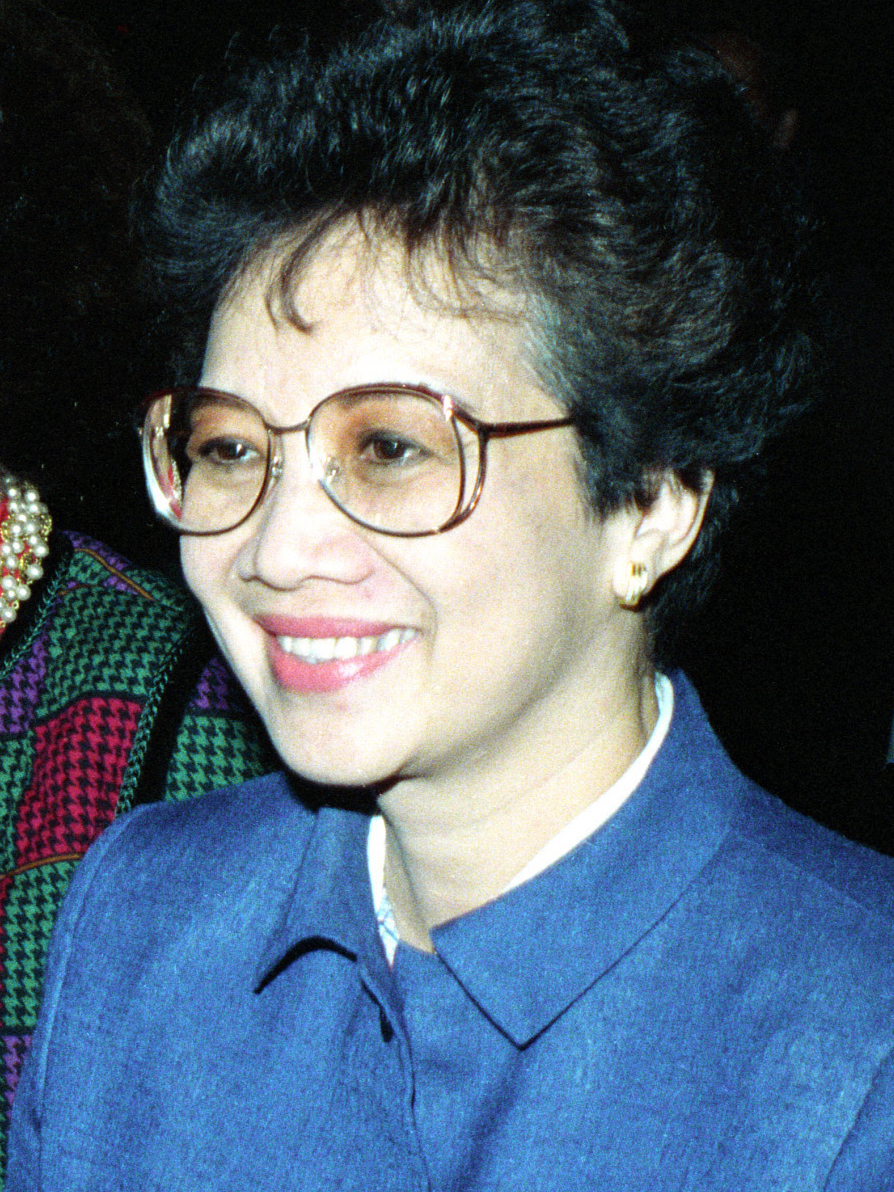
Corazon Aquino
President of the Philippines
(1986–1992)

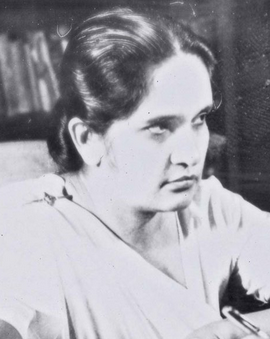
Sirimavo Bandaranaike
Prime Minister of Sri Lanka
(1960–1965, 1970–1977, 1994–2000)

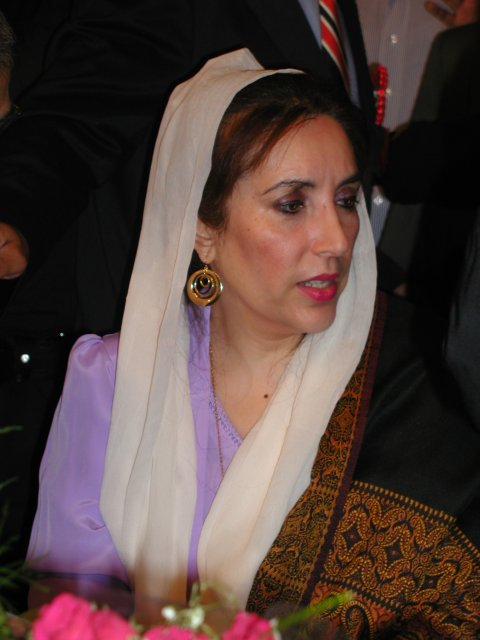
Benazir Bhutto
Prime Minister of Pakistan
(1988–1990, 1993–1996)

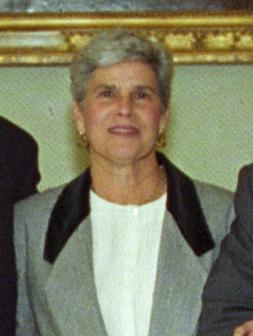
Violeta Chamorro
President of Nicaragua
(1990–1997)

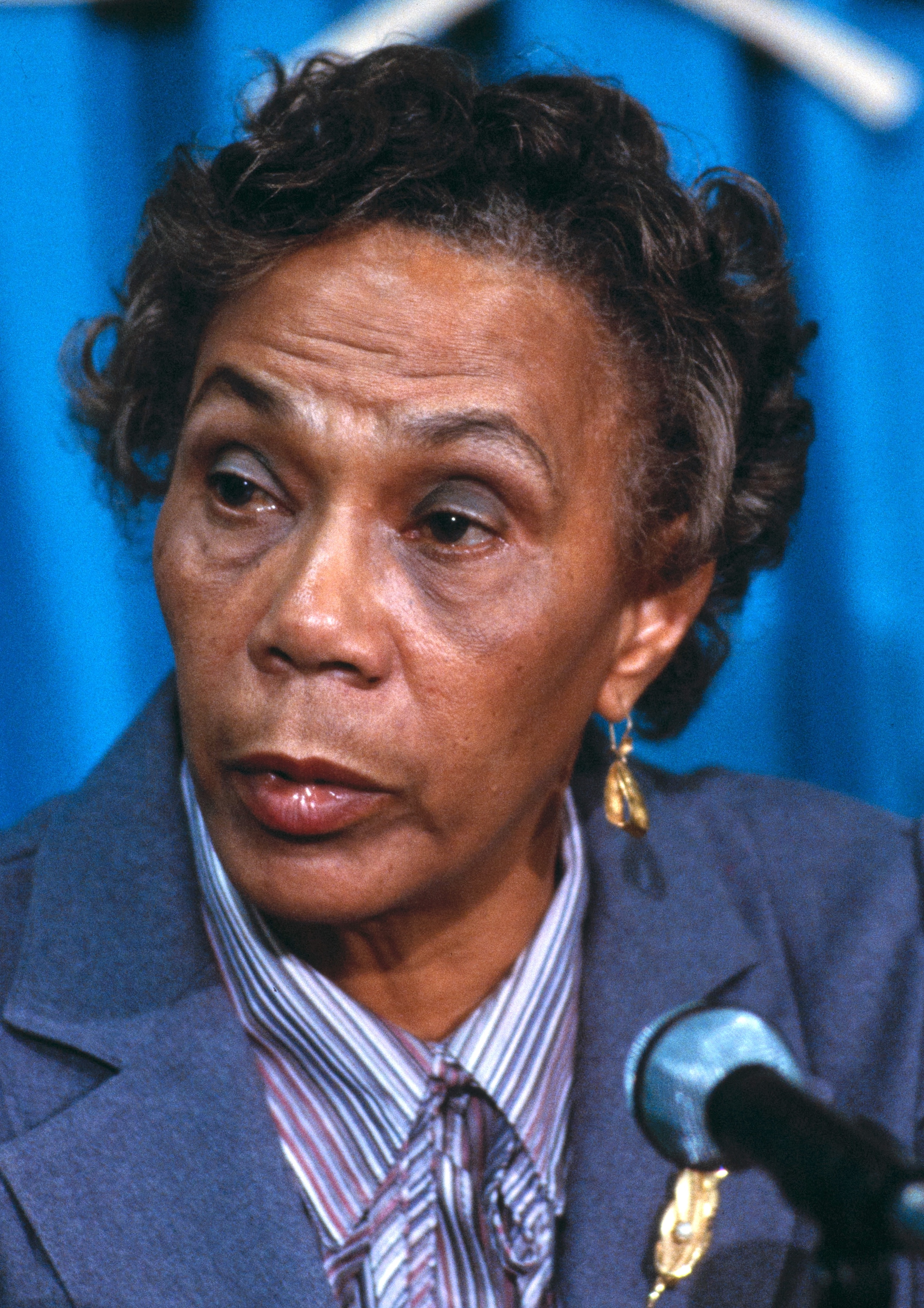
Eugenia Charles
Prime Minister of Dominica
(1980–1995)

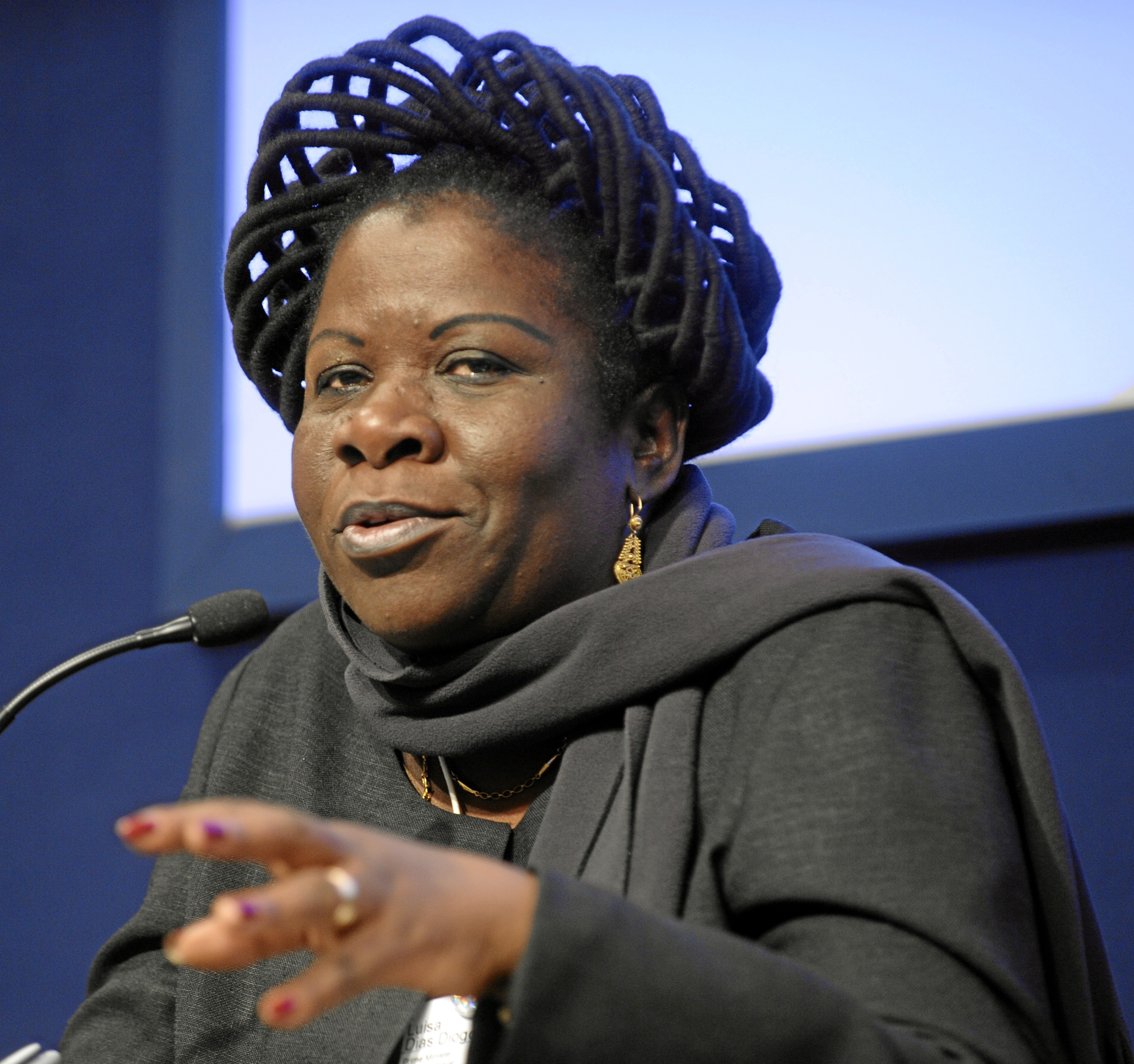
Luisa Diogo
Prime Minister of Mozambique
(2004–2010)

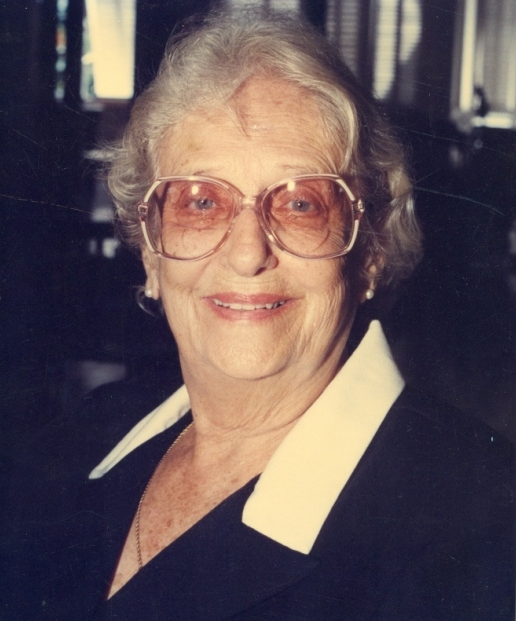
Janet Jagan
President of Guyana
(1997–1999)

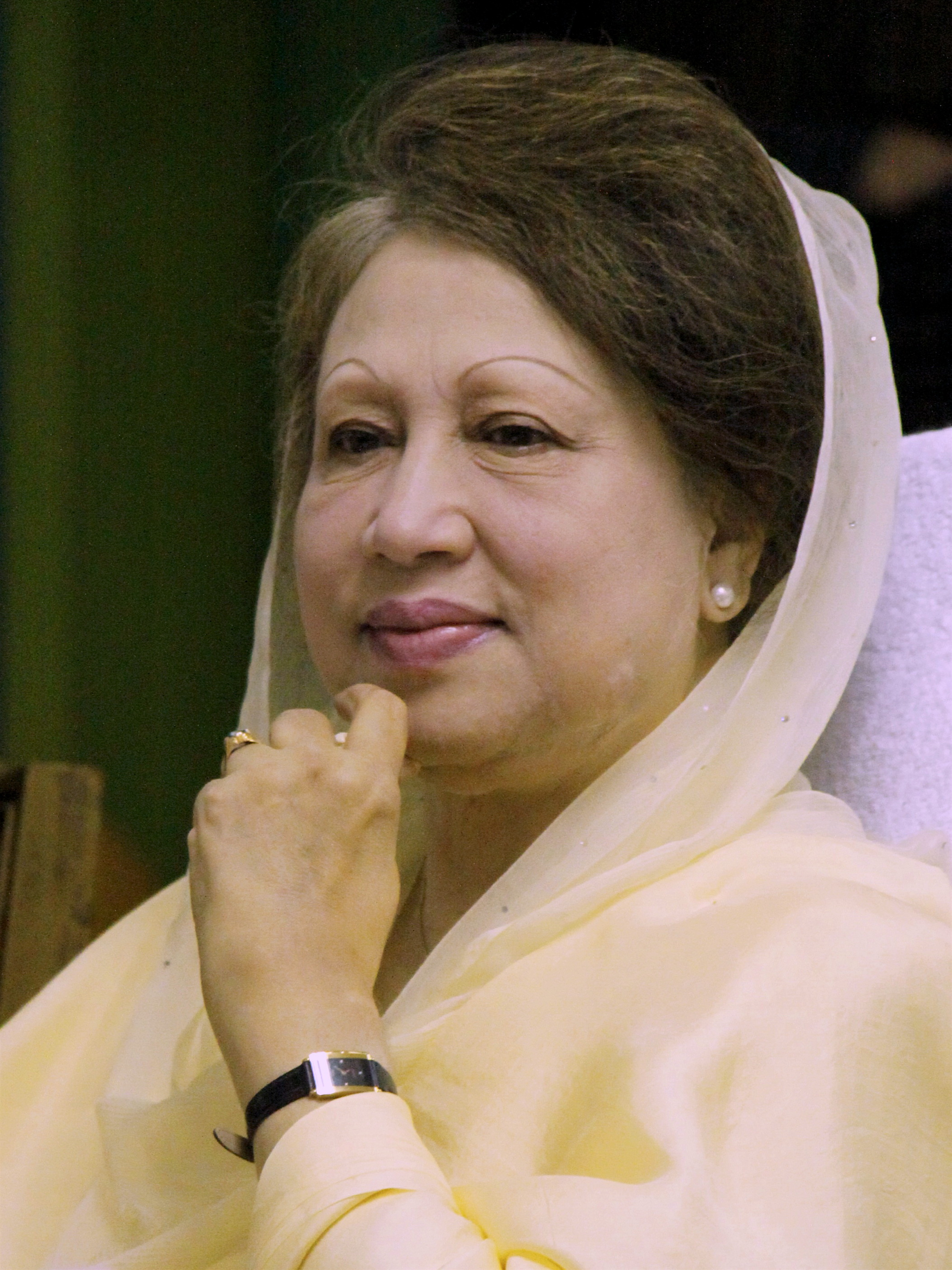
Khaleda Zia
Prime Minister of Bangladesh
(1991–1996, 2001–2006)

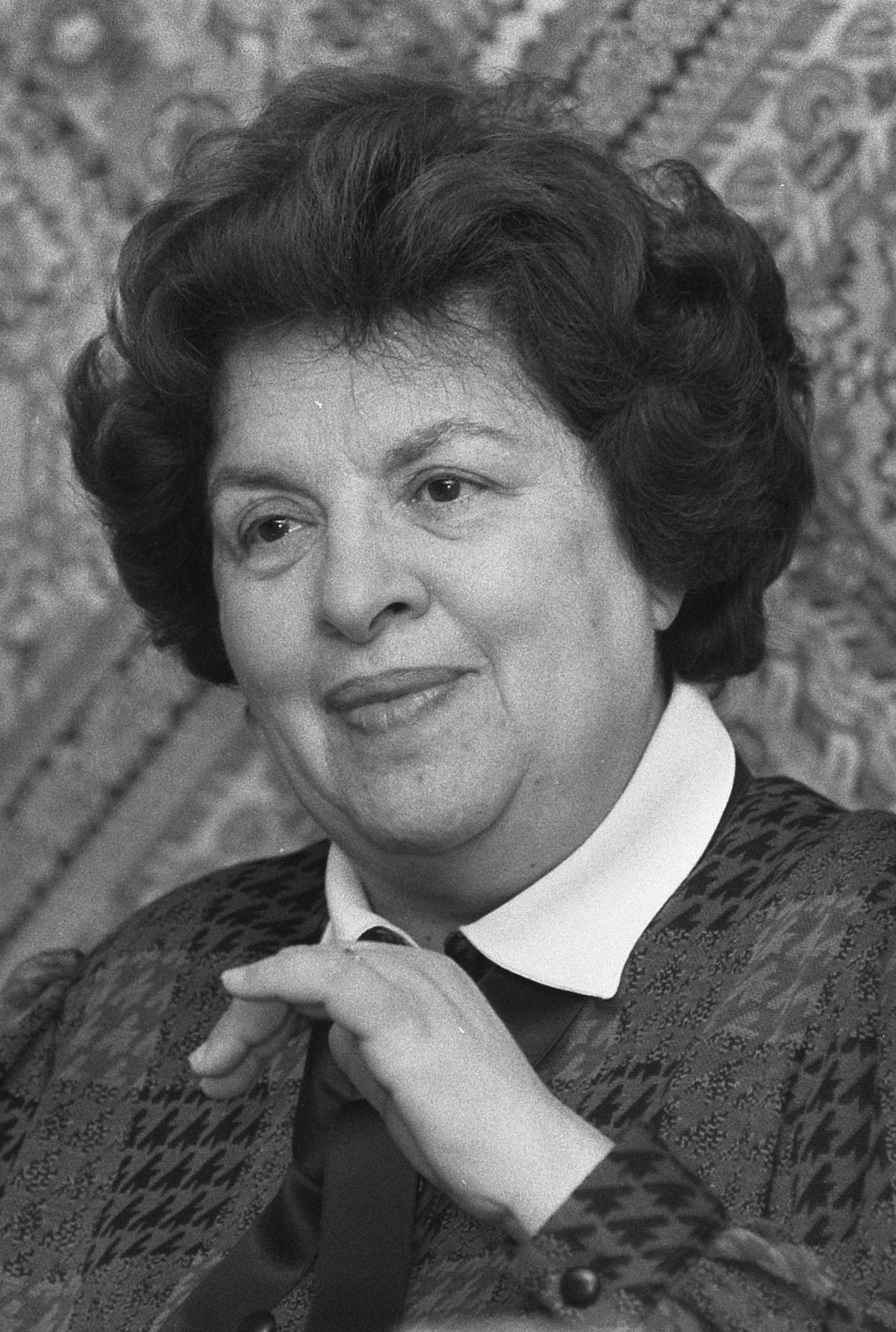
Maria de Lourdes Pintasilgo
Prime Minister of Portugal
(1979–1980)

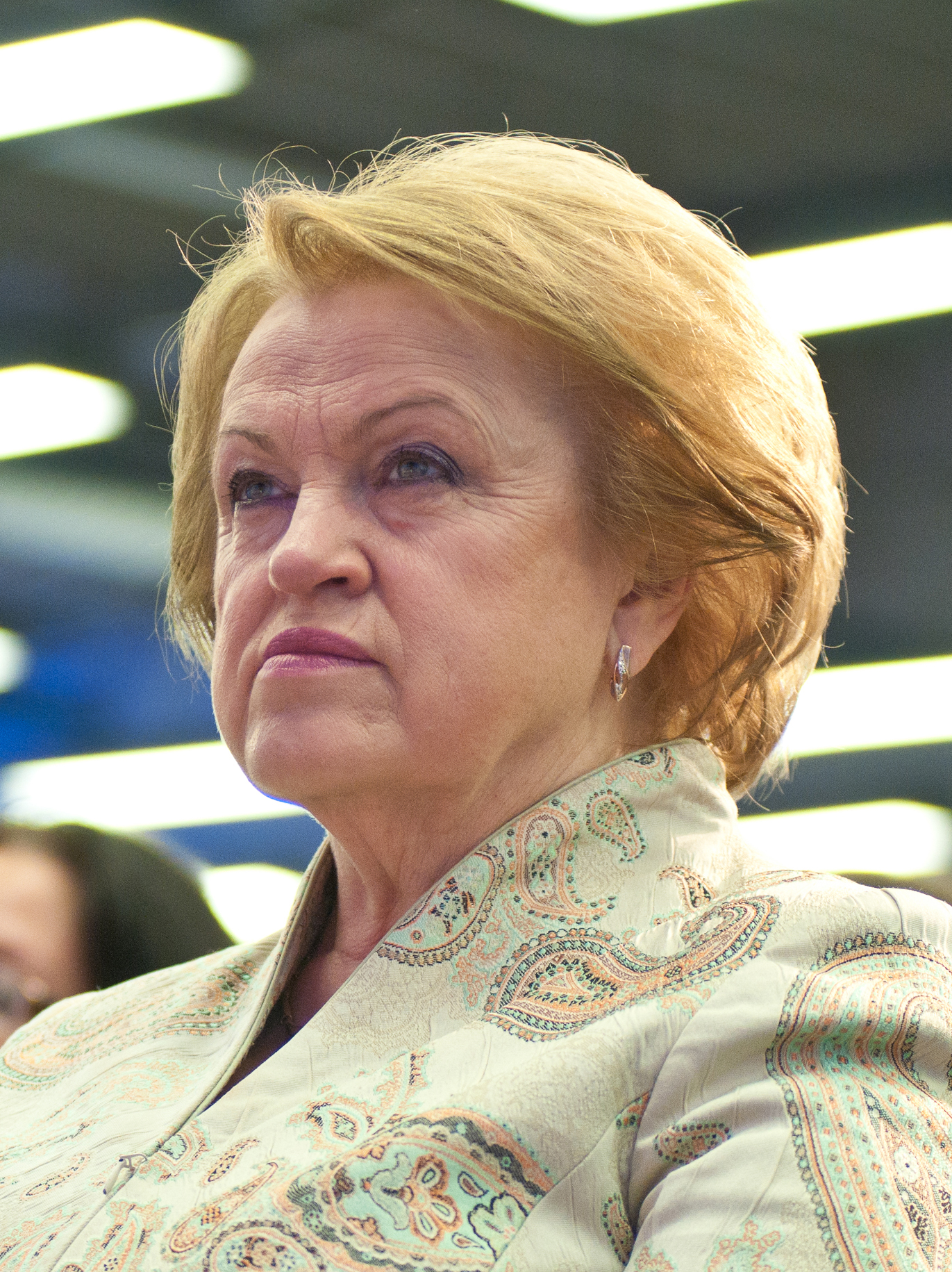
Kazimira Prunskienė
Prime Minister of Lithuania
(1990–1991)

== See also ==
- List of elected and appointed female heads of state and government
- United Nations Foundation
- Women Political Leaders
