= List of University of California, Davis alumni =

This page lists notable alumni of the University of California, Davis.

== Academics ==
UC Davis academics

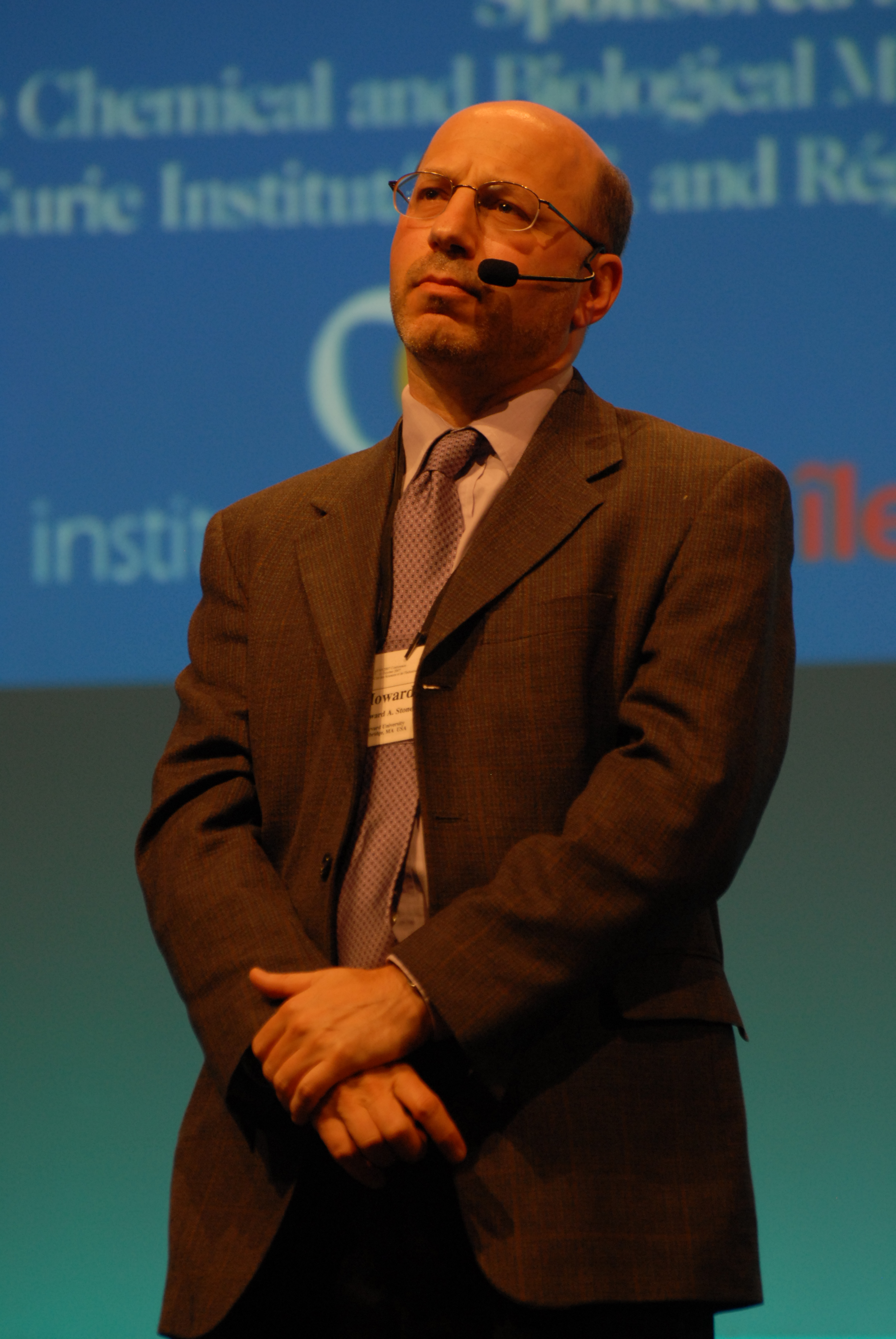
Howard A. Stone, B.S. – professor in Mechanical and Aerospace Engineering

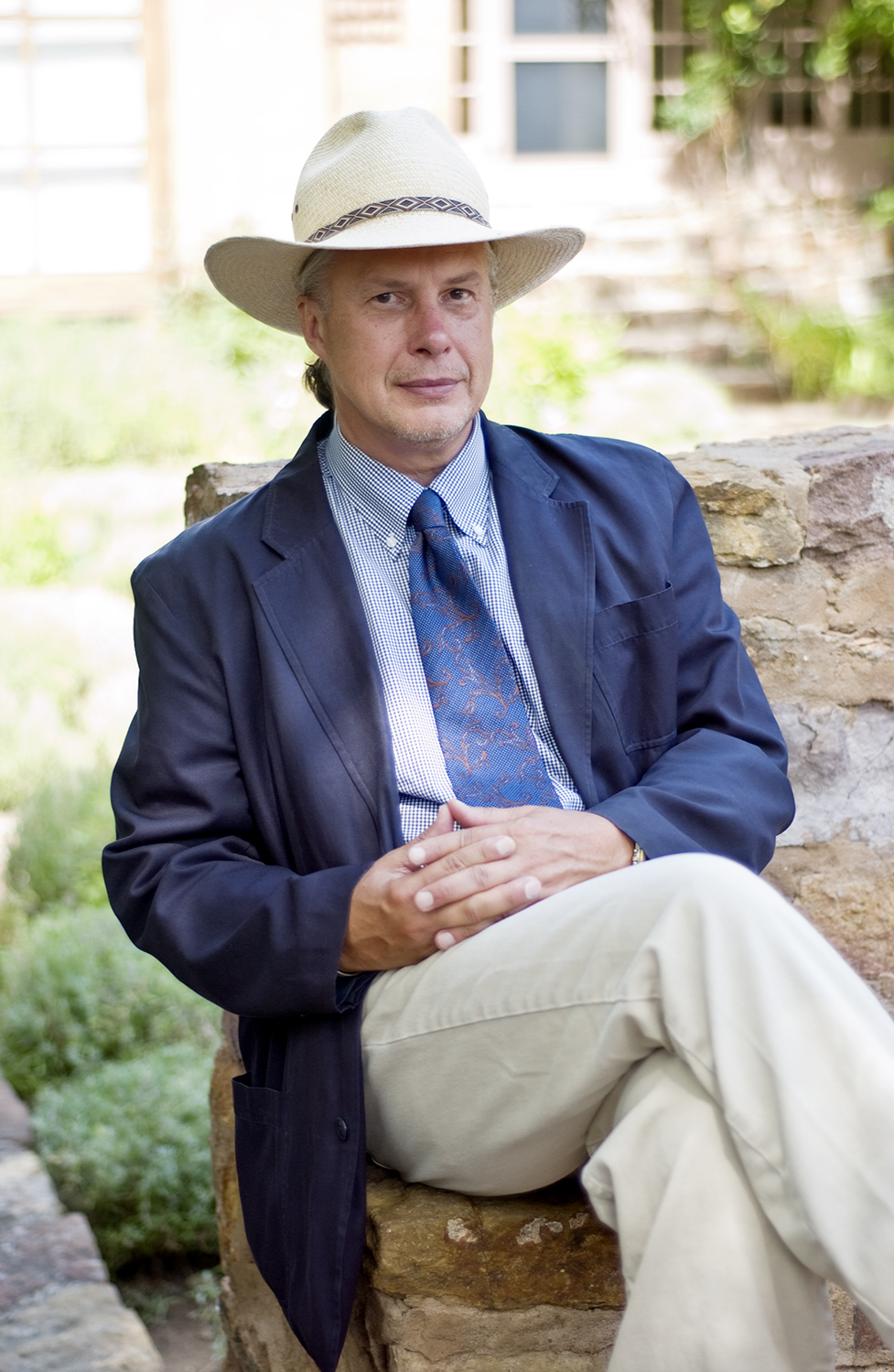
James F. Brooks, PhD – historian

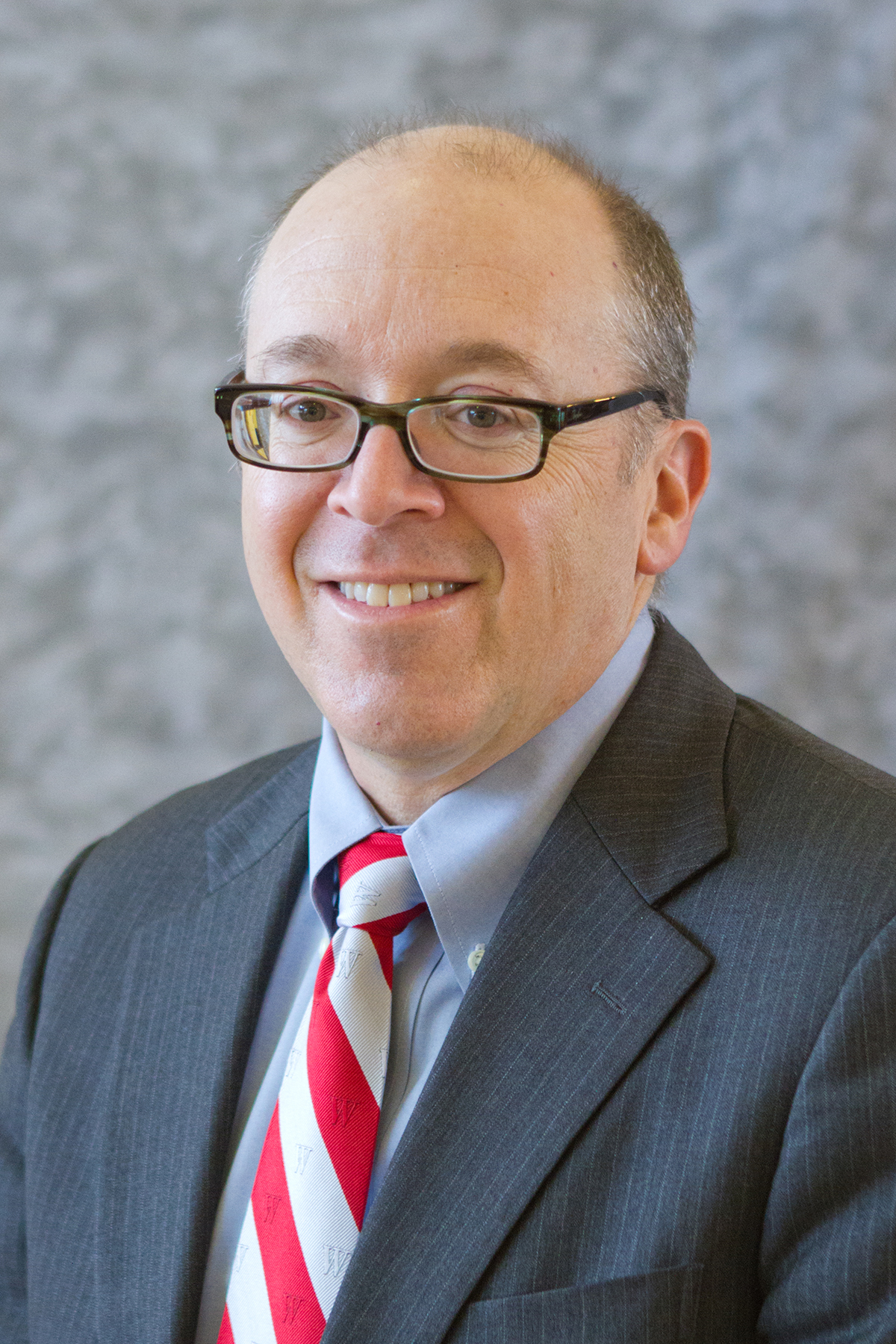
Greg Hess – economist, college administrator, and the president of Wabash College

Walter Harrison, PhD – scholar of American Literature and Culture, and president of the University of Hartford

=== University presidents ===
- Carol Folt, 11th chancellor, and 29th chief executive, of the University of North Carolina at Chapel Hill
- F. Chris Garcia, former president of the University of New Mexico
- Douglas Girod, current chancellor of the University of Kansas
- Michael R. Gottfredson, former president of the University of Oregon
- Walter Harrison, president of the University of Hartford
- Greg Hess, former president of Wabash College
- Mondo Kagonyera, chancellor of Makerere University in Uganda
- Michael Kotlikoff PhD, provost and president of Cornell University
- Richard Miller, founding president of Olin College
- Indira Samarasekera, former president of the University of Alberta

=== Professors ===
- Richard A. Andersen, professor of neuroscience at the California Institute of Technology
- Tani E. Barlow, professor of history at Rice University
- Bonnie Bassler, professor of molecular biology, Princeton University, MacArthur Fellowship
- Hugo J. Bellen, professor of molecular and human genetics, Baylor College of Medicine, and Howard Hughes Medical Institute Investigator
- Gregory Berns, Distinguished Chair of Neuroeconomics in the Department of Psychiatry and Behavioral Sciences, Emory University School of Medicine
- Daniel T. Blumstein, professor and chair for the Department of Ecology and Evolutionary Biology at UCLA
- Robert Boyd, professor of the School of Human Evolution and Social Change (SHESC) at Arizona State University
- James F. Brooks, professor of history at University of California, Santa Barbara
- Janet Broughton, professor of philosophy and vice provost of UC Berkeley
- Julia Chan, professor of chemistry at the University of Texas at Dallas
- Constance J. Chang-Hasnain, professor of electrical engineering at the University of California, Berkeley
- Mary Croughan, epidemiologist and academic administrator
- Philippe Desan, professor of French and history of culture at the University of Chicago
- M. Brent Donnellan, professor of psychology at Texas A&M University
- Harry C. Dorn, chemist, professor of chemistry at Virginia Tech
- Bonnie S. Dunbar, former professor in the department of molecular and cell biology at Baylor University
- Mustafa Emirbayer, professor of sociology at University of Wisconsin-Madison
- Max Essex, professor of health sciences at Harvard University
- Lewis J. Feldman, professor of plant biology at UC Berkeley
- Heinz Insu Fenkl, Professor of English, the State University of New York, New Paltz
- Katherine Ferrara, professor of radiology at Stanford University
- Cynthia Friend, Theodore William Richards Professor of Chemistry and Professor of Materials Science at Harvard University
- Bruce Frohnen, professor of law at Ohio Northern University
- Stephen Glosecki, scholar of Old English
- Rao S. Govindaraju, professor of civil engineering at Purdue University
- Olivia Graeve, professor of mechanical and aerospace engineering at University of California, San Diego
- Lori Cox Han, professor of political science at Chapman University
- Jo Hardin, professor of mathematics at Pomona College
- Burton Hatlen, literary scholar and professor at University of Maine
- James A. Herrick, Guy Vanderjagt Professor of Communication and former communication chair at Hope College
- Godfrey Hewitt, professor and evolutionary geneticist at University of East Anglia
- Donna Hoffman, professor of marketing at George Washington University
- Andrew D. Huberman, professor of neuroscience at Stanford University
- Amishi Jha, professor of psychology at University of Miami
- Eric A. Johnson, retired professor of Bacteriology from the University of Wisconsin-Madison
- Jason P Jue, professor of computer science at the University of Texas at Dallas
- Anil Kashyap, professor of economics and finance at University of Chicago
- Robert Lieber, professor of the Department of Government and School of Foreign Service at Georgetown University
- Elizabeth G. Loboa, provost and vice president for academic affairs at Southern Methodist University
- Theraphan Luangthongkum, linguistics professor at Chulalongkorn University, Thailand
- Bruce A. Manning, professor of chemistry and biochemistry at San Francisco State University
- Eric Mar, professor of Asian American studies at San Francisco State University
- John Marini (PhD), professor of political science at the University of Nevada, Reno
- Mark Matsumoto, dean of engineering at University of California, Merced
- Elvira de Mejia, professor of food sciences and human nutrition at the University of Illinois at Urbana–Champaign
- Deanna Needell, professor of mathematics at the University of California, Los Angeles
- Loreen Olson, professor in the Communications Studies Department of University of North Carolina at Greensboro specializing in family communication
- Mohamed Omar, professor of mathematics at Harvey Mudd College
- H. Allen Orr, professor of biology at University of Rochester
- William S. Penn, English professor at Michigan State University
- Gordon Rausser, Robert Gordon Sproul Distinguished Professor Emeritus of Economics at the University of California, Berkeley
- Peter Richerson, professor emeritus at UC Davis
- Jean Beagle Ristaino, professor of plant pathology at North Carolina State University
- Pearl T. Robinson, professor of political science at Tufts University
- Shawna Yang Ryan, professor at University of Hawaiʻi at Mānoa
- Kirsten Saxton, professor at Mills College
- Julie K. Silver, professor at Harvard Medical School
- Meredith Small, professor of anthropology at Cornell University
- Justin E. H. Smith, professor at Paris Diderot University
- Gary D. Solis, adjunct professor of law who teaches the laws of war at the Georgetown University Law Center
- Nancy Butler Songer, dean of the School of Education at Drexel University
- Howard A. Stone, professor of mechanical and aerospace engineering at Princeton University
- Steven D. Tanksley, professor of plant breeding and biometry at Cornell University
- David Hurst Thomas, professor at Columbia University
- Martin Tolich, professor of sociology at University of Otago
- JoAnn Trejo, professor of pharmacology at University of California, San Diego
- Athula Wikramanayake, professor at the University of Miami
- Kou Yang, ethnic studies professor at California State University, Stanislaus
- Xu Xiaonian, professor of economics and finance at China Europe International Business School

== Science ==
UC Davis Scientists

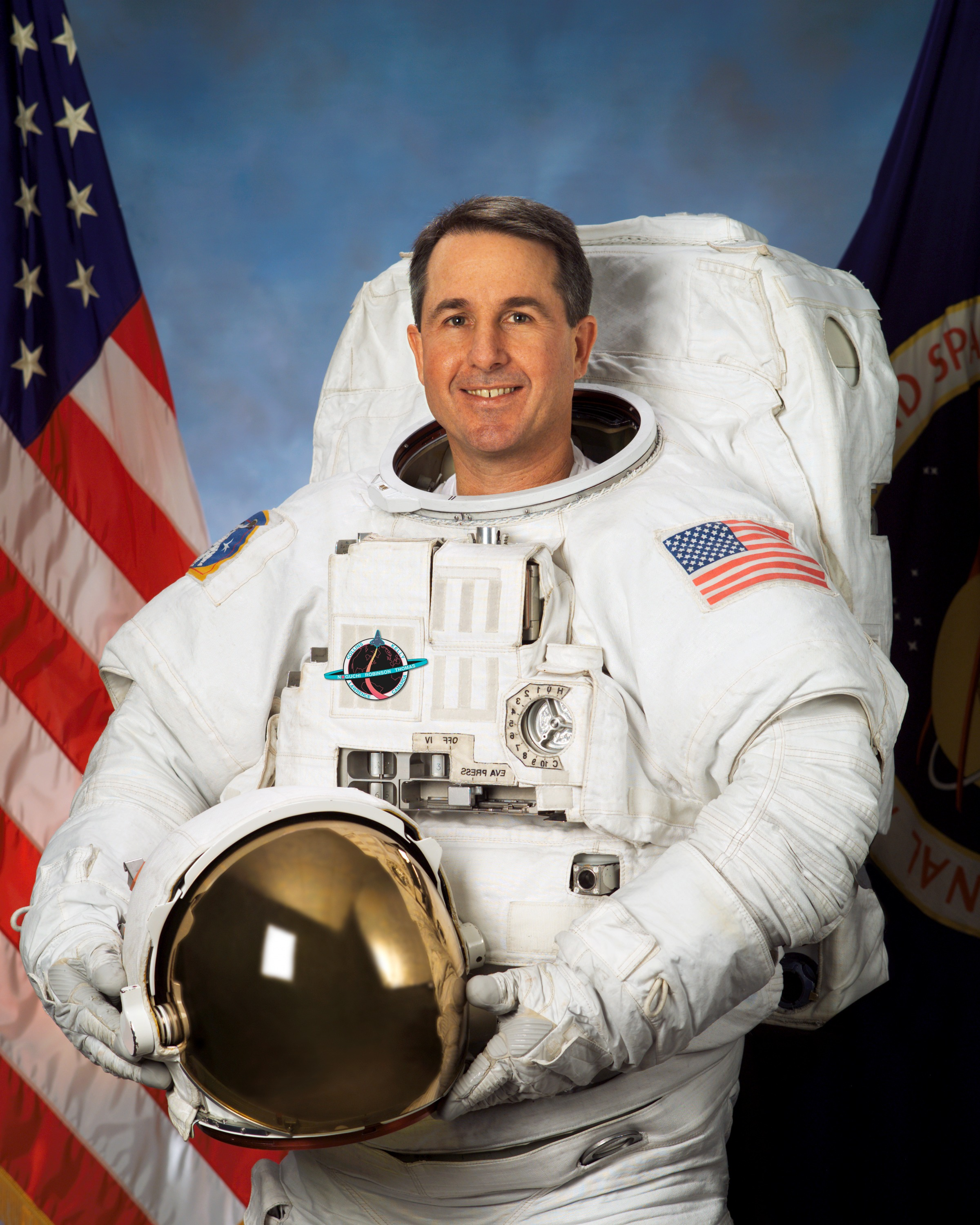
Stephen Robinson, B.S. 1978 – NASA astronaut

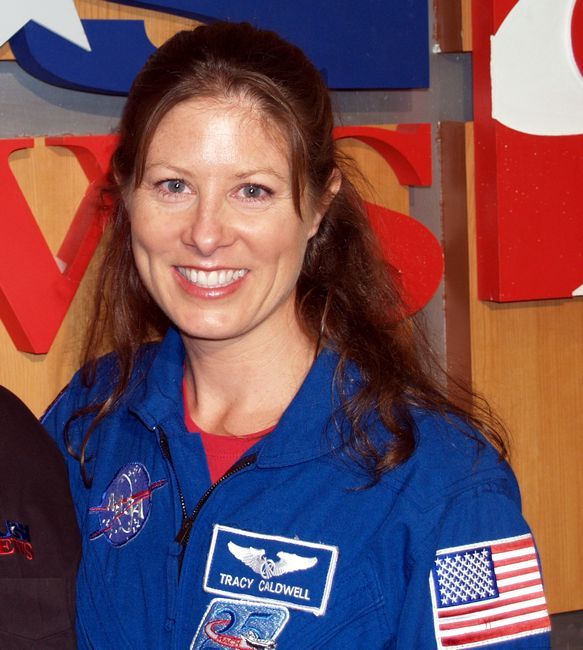
Tracy Caldwell Dyson, B.S. 1993 – chemist and NASA astronaut

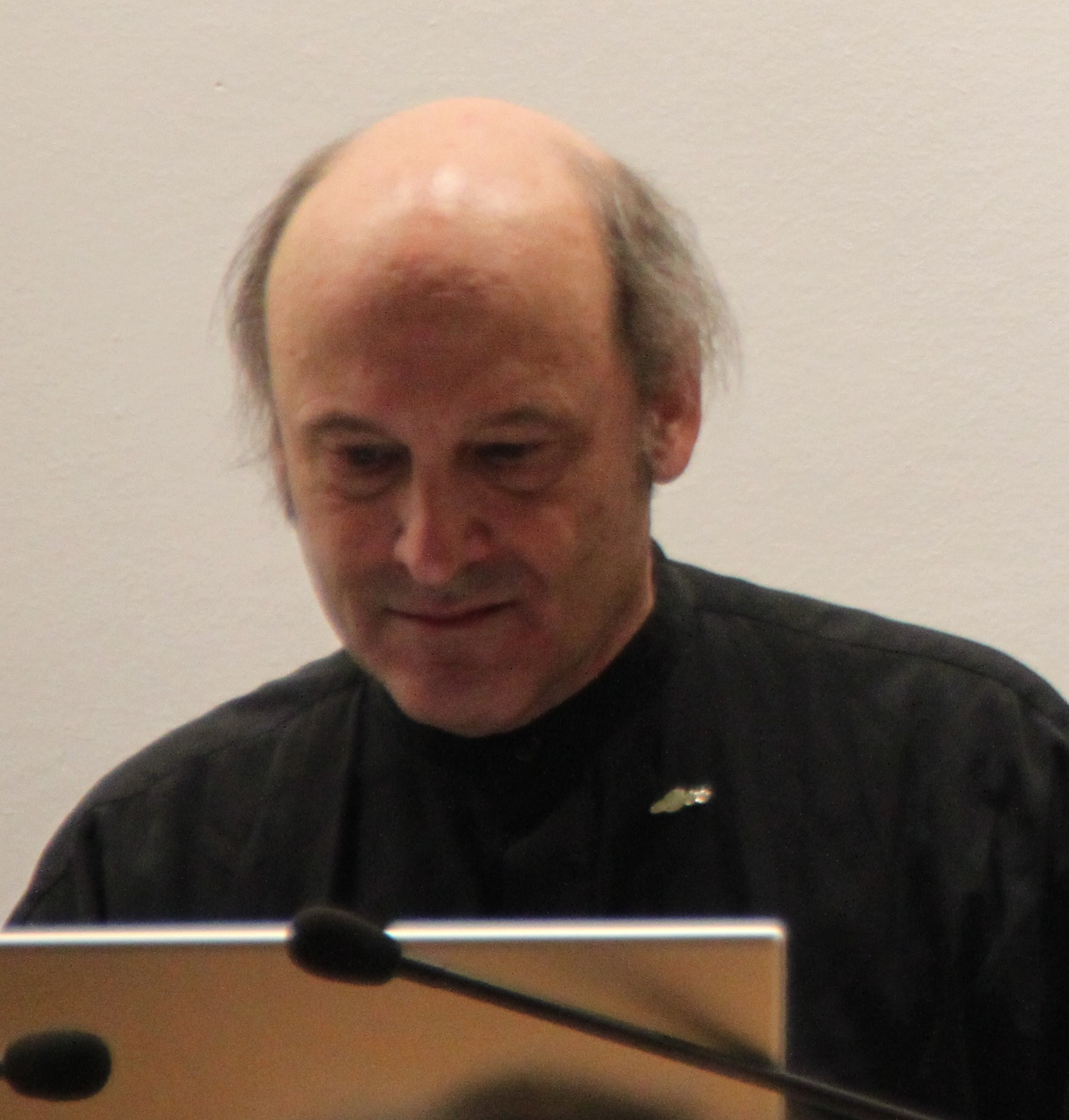
Chris Crawford, B.S. 1972 – computer game designer and writer

=== Computer science ===
- John Black, cryptologist who has been involved in the invention of several cryptographic algorithms including UMAC, PMAC, OCB, and CMAC
- Chris Crawford, game designer
- Karen Crowther, video game designer
- Rael Dornfest, former engineer at Twitter, founder and CEO of Values of N
- Deborah Frincke, head of research at the National Security Agency
- Timothy Jurka, developer of RTextTools and MaxEnt for the R statistical programming language
- Sam Lantinga, former lead software engineer at Blizzard Entertainment, creator of Simple DirectMedia Layer
- Eric Lengyel, computer game engine developer with expertise in 3D graphics, animation, physics, audio, and networking
- Patrick J. Miller, known for building largest temporary supercomputer
- Peter J. Salzman, hacker, former senior member of hacker group Legion of Doom
- Carl Sassenrath, developer of REBOL language, CTO of REBOL

=== Engineering ===
- David Abe, head of the Electromagnetics Technology Branch at the U.S. Naval Research Laboratory
- Kimberly S. Budil, director of Lawrence Livermore National Laboratory
- Miaofang Chi, senior scientist at Oak Ridge National Laboratory
- Chow Chung-kong, chemical engineer, chairman of Hong Kong Exchanges and Clearing
- Laurie Grindle, deputy director of NASA's Armstrong Flight Research Center
- Kaveh Madani, Iranian civil and environmental engineer
- Sig Mejdal, sabermetrics analyst, former NASA engineer
- Nelson Pass, audio engineer
- David Phillips, civil engineer
- Bernard Soriano, aeronautical engineer, deputy director of the California Department of Motor Vehicles
- Jeffrey Steefel, video game producer
- Adam Steltzner, NASA JPL lead engineer
- Alvin S. White, test pilot, mechanical engineer

=== Economics ===
- James C. Cox, economist at Georgia State University
- Ahmad Faruqui, defense analyst and economist
- Masami Imai, Japanese economist
- Timothy Francis McCarthy, financial services chief executive
- Mahmoud Solh, Lebanese agricultural economist and genetic scientist; director general of the International Center for Agricultural Research in the Dry Areas

=== Biology ===
- Charles M. Rice, 2020 Nobel Prize in Physiology or Medicine laureate
- Anurag Agrawal, ecologist, evolutionary biologist
- Alice Alldredge, oceanographer, marine biologist
- Jon Andrus, physician, epidemiologist and immunization specialist, deputy director of the Pan American Health Organization
- Dean Burk, co-discoverer of biotin
- Lee Burnett, osteopathic physician, U.S. Army colonel, and founder of Student Doctor Network
- Gordon Conway, former president of the Royal Geographical Society
- Edward DeLong, marine microbiologist
- Katherine Esau, German-American botanist who received the National Medal of Science for her work on plant anatomy
- Brian Fisher, field biologist who works on the systematics of arthropods
- Katherine A. Flores (medical school graduate), clinical professor at UCSF School of Medicine, physician, and activist for recruiting and retaining LatinX medical professionals
- Niklaus Grunwald, plant pathologist and professor
- Brian Hanley, microbiologist and biohacker
- Catherine T. Hunt, chemist
- Jae U. Jung, South Korea biologist
- Gurdev Khush, Indian agronomist and winner of the World Food Prize
- Lynn Kimsey, professor of entomology
- Laurence Madin, marine biologist, executive vice president and director of research of Woods Hole Oceanographic Institution
- Robert W. Malone, virologist and immunologist
- Bruce A. Manning, professor of biochemistry at San Francisco University
- David Mas Masumoto, author and organic farmer
- Frederick Murphy, co-discoverer of the Ebola virus
- Iyabo Obasanjo-Bello, Nigerian epidemiologist
- Robert E. Page, Jr., honey bee geneticist
- Herman Phaff, yeast ecologist
- Eric W. Sanderson, landscape ecologist
- H. Michael Shepard, cancer biologist and discoverer of Herceptin
- Gary Strobel, microbiologist
- David Hurst Thomas, archaeologist and anthropologist
- Linfa Wang, director at Duke-NUS Medical School
- Thomas W. Whitaker, 1927, botanist and horticulturist

=== Geosciences ===
- Gabriel Filippelli, biogeochemist
- Christopher G. Newhall, volcanologist

=== Other ===
- Patricia S. Cowings, NASA psychologist, first African American woman trained to be an astronaut
- Frederica Darema, Greek physicist who proposed the SPMD programming model
- Diane Fordney, sex therapist
- Nadine Burke Harris, pediatrician, advisory council member for Clinton Foundation's "Too Small to Fail" campaign
- William Hirstein, philosopher primarily interested in philosophy of mind, philosophy of language, metaphysics, cognitive science, and analytic philosophy
- Michael MacCracken, chief scientist for climate programs at the Climate Institute
- Kay Mehren, veterinarian and zoologist, veterinarian emeritus at the Toronto Zoo
- Sarah Myhre, climate scientist
- Zdenka Samish, Czech-Israeli food technology researcher
- Michael Wang, distinguished fellow at Argonne National Laboratory
- Henry Wedler, blind entrepreneur and chemist
- Jeff Werber, veterinarian

== Arts, entertainment, and literature ==
UC Davis Arts, Entertainment, and Literature Alumni

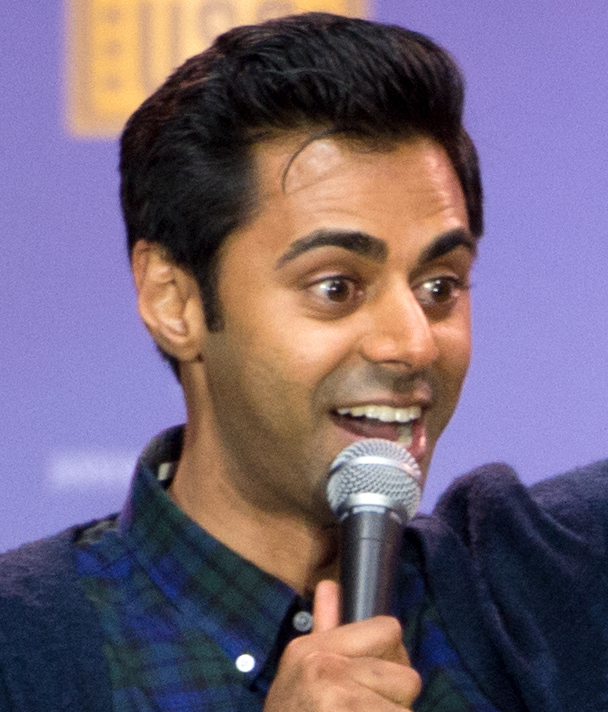
Hasan Minhaj, B.A. – actor and comedian

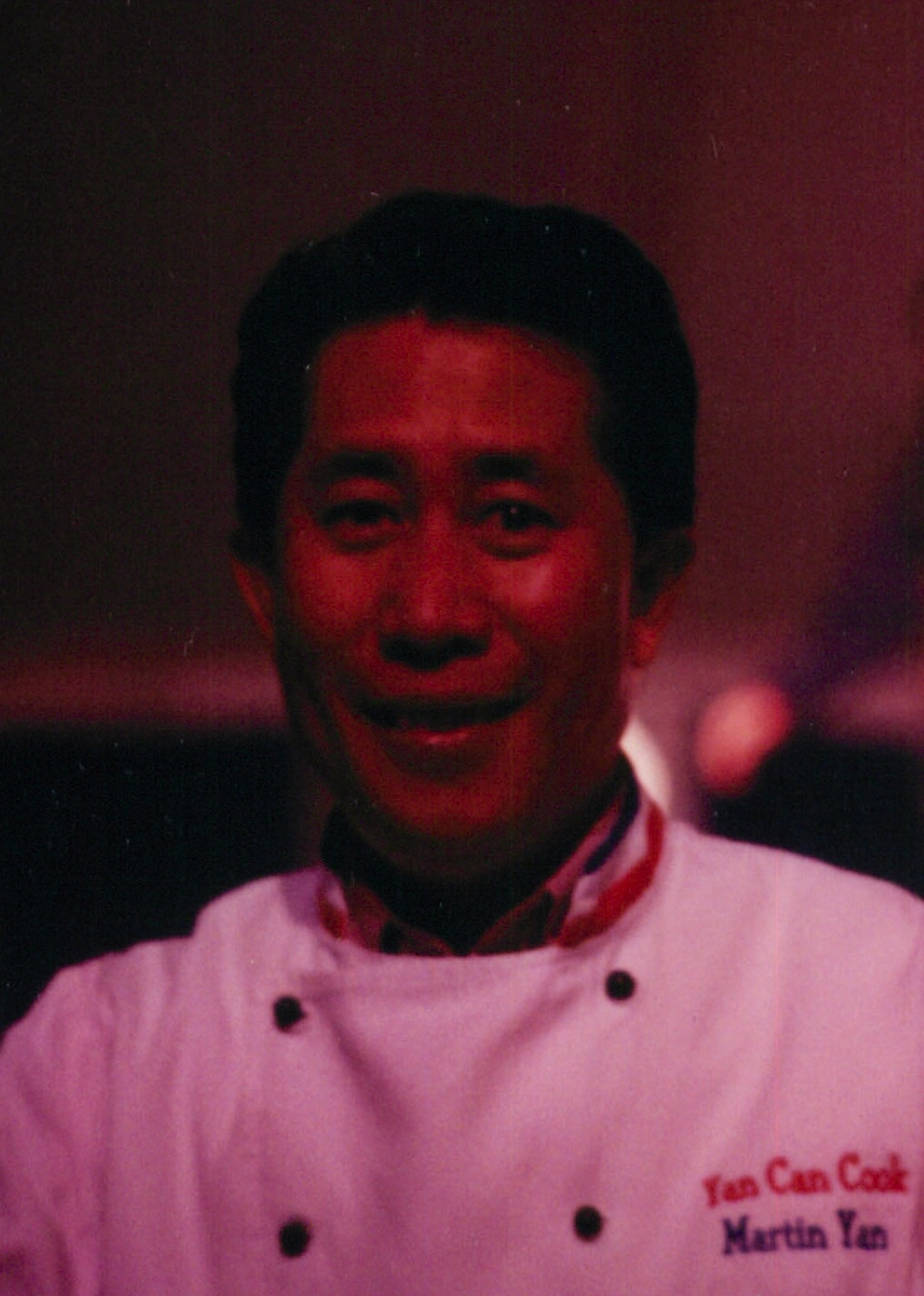
Martin Yan, M.A. 1975 – chef and food writer

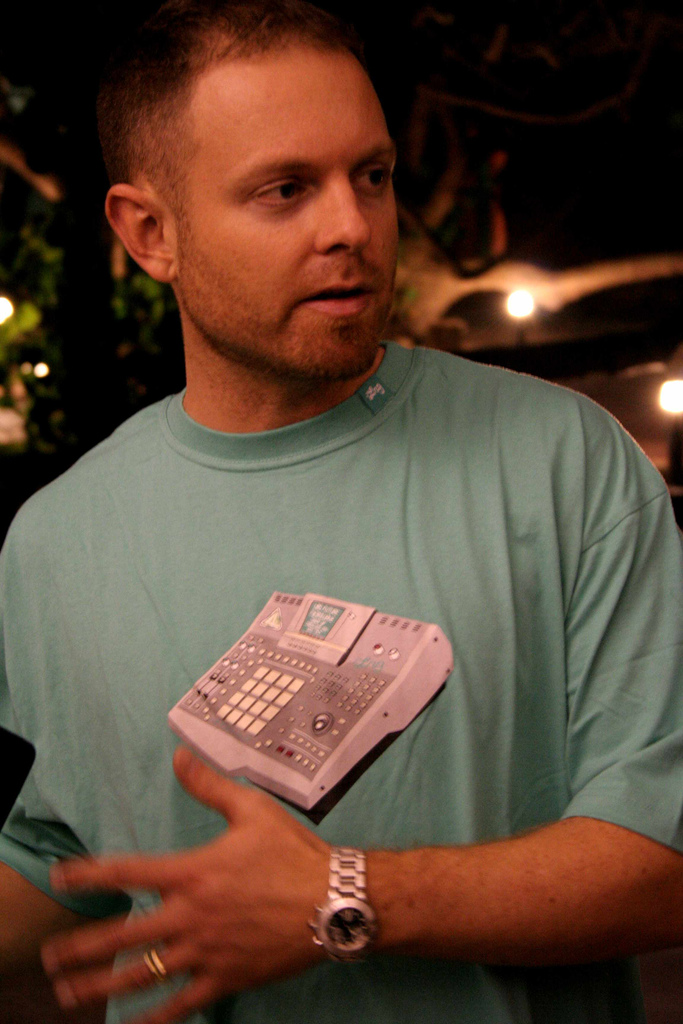
DJ Shadow, B.A. – record producer and DJ

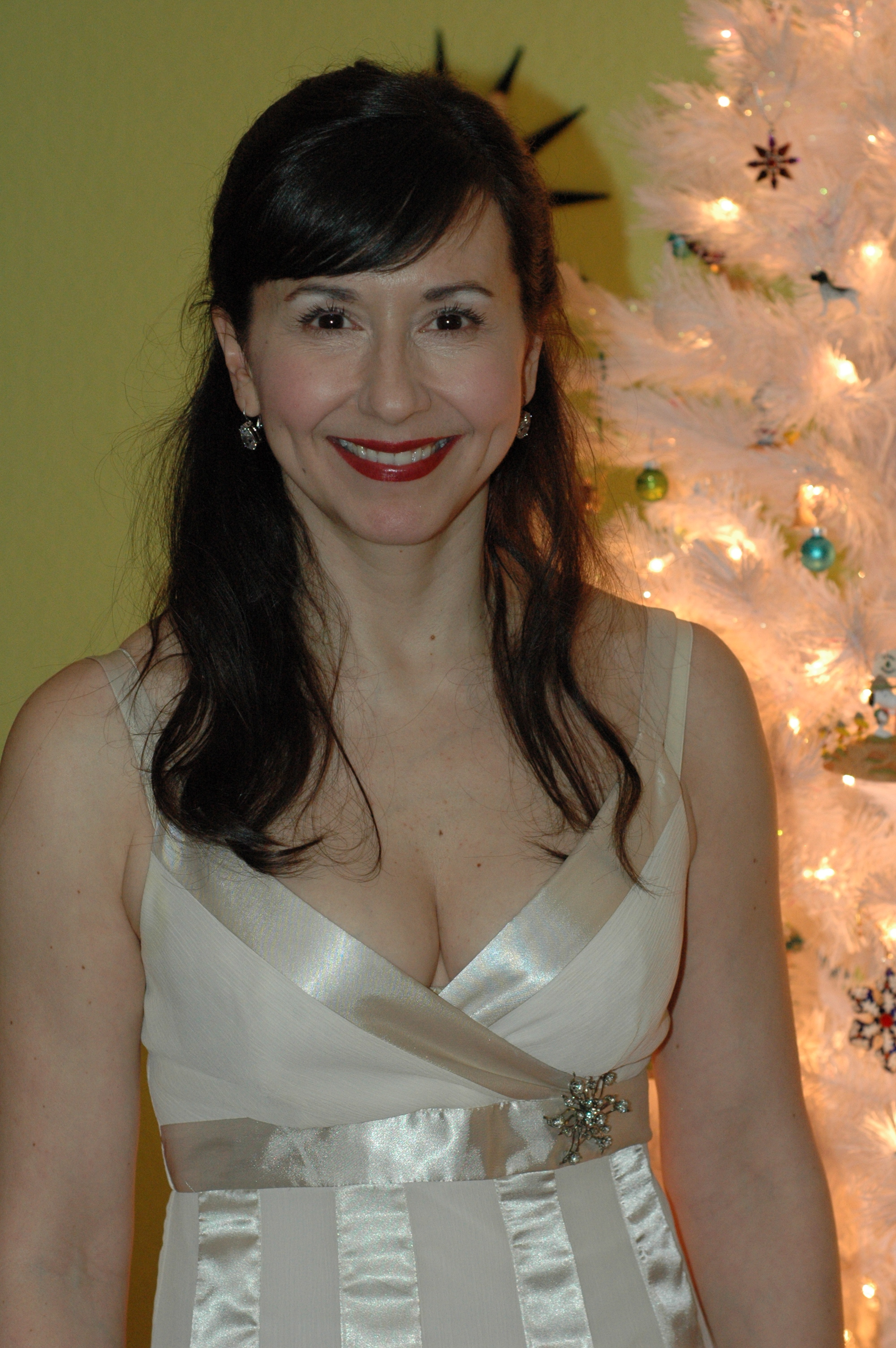
Terisa Greenan – film producer, film director, actress

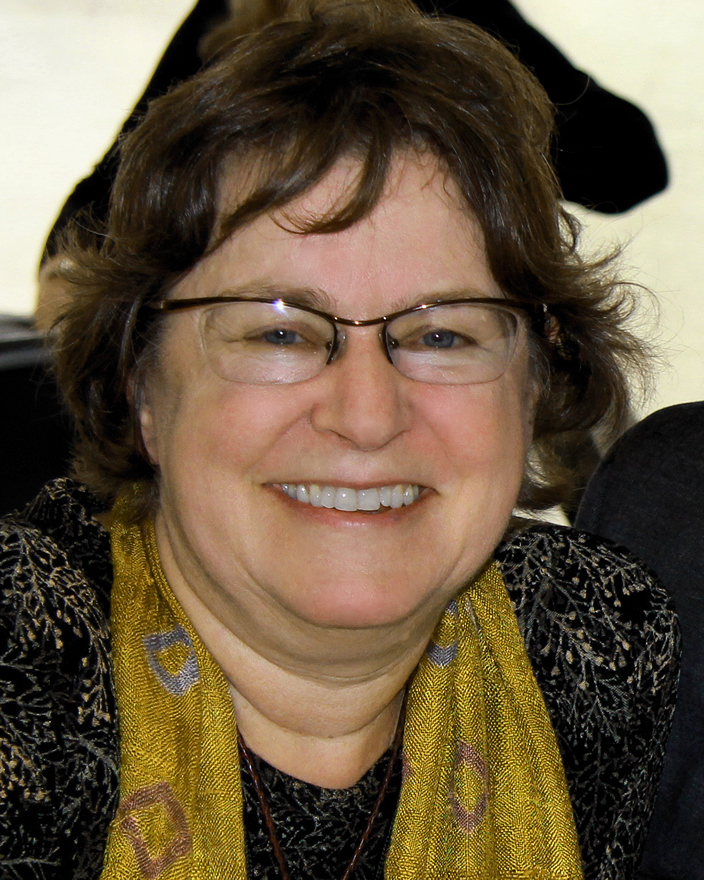
Karen Joy Fowler, B.A. – author of science fiction, fantasy, and literary fiction

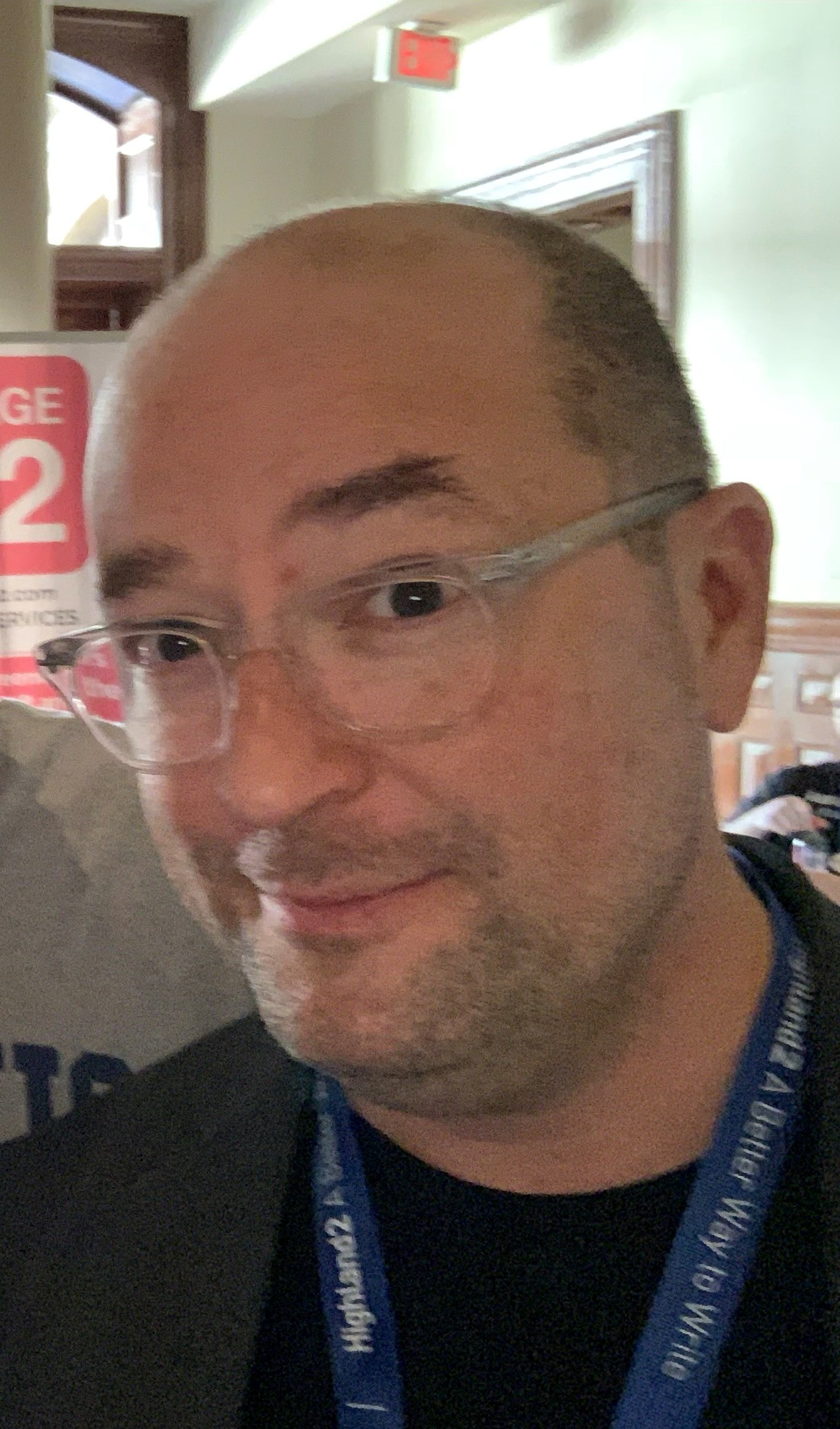
Christopher Markus, M.A. 1996 – Emmy winner, screenwriter on Captain America: The First Avenger, Captain America: The Winter Soldier, Captain America: Civil War, Avengers: Infinity War and Avengers: Endgame

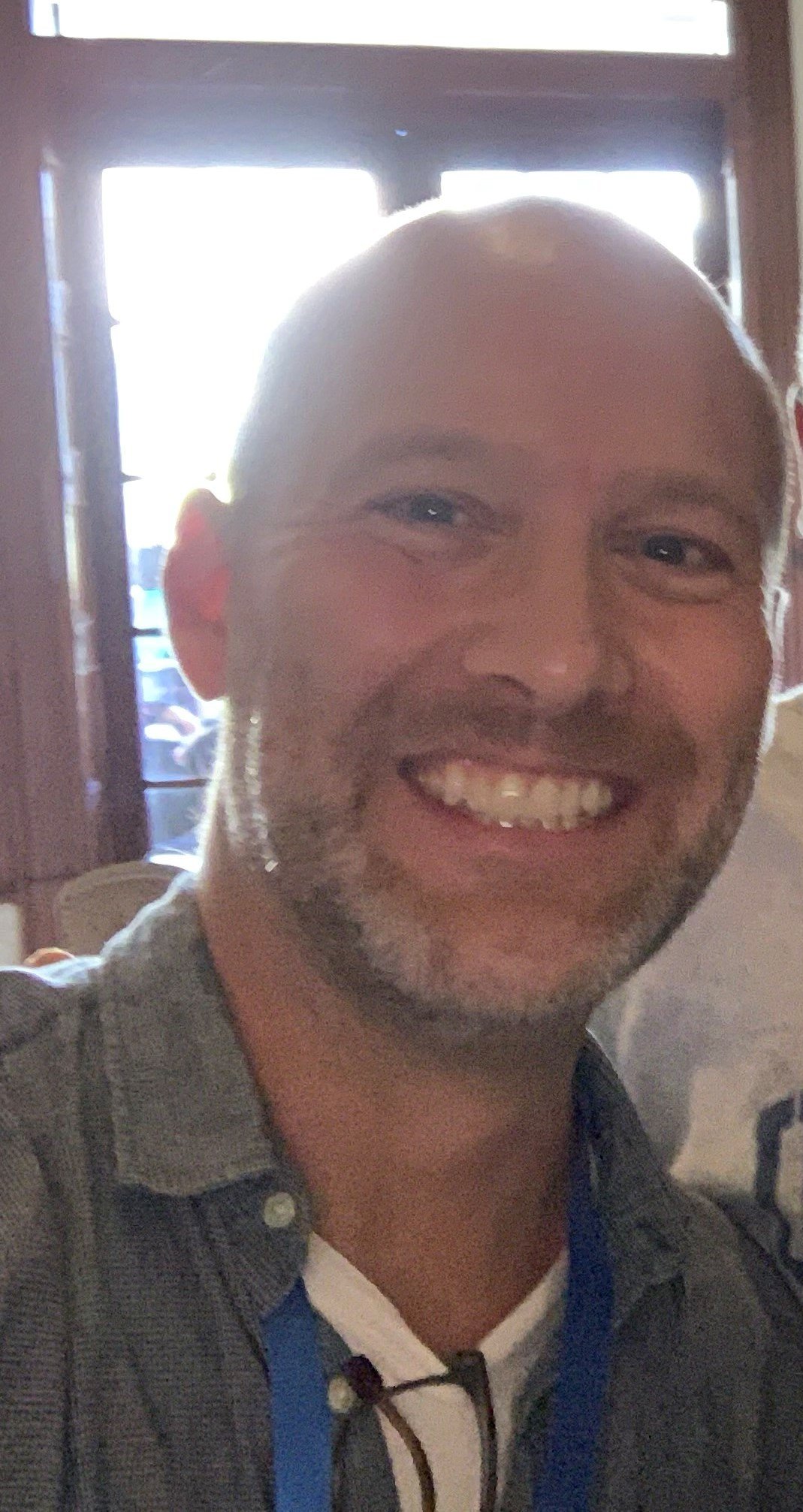
Stephen McFeely, M.A. 1996 – Emmy winner, screenwriter on Captain America: The First Avenger, Captain America: The Winter Soldier, Captain America: Civil War, Avengers: Infinity War and Avengers: Endgame

=== Fine art ===
- Christopher Brown (M.F.A. 1976), painter, printmaker, and professor
- Shirley Burman, railroad photographer
- Charles Burns, cartoonist and illustrator
- Deborah Butterfield, sculptor
- Kathy Butterly, sculptor
- Nancy Carman, ceramic artist
- Carter, artist
- Victor Cicansky, Canadian sculptor
- Vicky A Clark, curator
- Ed Darack, author, photographer
- Victor De La Rosa, digital textile artist, educator
- Sarah DeRemer, artist
- Kurt Edward Fishback, photographer
- Camille Rose Garcia, lowbrow artist
- Steve Lambert, artist
- Kenney Mencher, painter
- Nickolas Mohanna, artist and composer
- Dave Muller, painter, installation art
- Bruce Nauman, artist
- Richard T. Notkin, ceramic artist
- Maija Peeples-Bright, painter, ceramist
- Irene Pijoan, painter, sculptor, educator
- Nancy Rubins, sculptor
- Ethan Russell, the only rock photographer to have shot album covers for The Beatles, The Rolling Stones and The Who
- Duane Slick, painter and professor
- Elizabeth Stephens, artist, sculptor, filmmaker, photographer
- Vonn Cummings Sumner, painter
- Richard Whitten (MFA 1987), painter and sculptor

=== Music ===
- Yul Anderson, pianist, guitarist, singer
- Cam, country music artist known for the hit "Burning House"
- Luciano Chessa, Italian musicologist
- Gift of Gab, rapper
- Rita Hosking, award-winning songwriter, singer
- Ruby Ibarra, rapper
- Tom Jans, singer/songwriter
- The Jealous Sound, indie rock band
- Knapsack, indie rock band
- Lateef the Truthspeaker (real name Lateef Daumont), rapper
- Lyrics Born (real name Tom Shimura), rapper
- Steven Mackey, guitarist and composer
- Scott Miller, guitarist and singer/songwriter, founder of Game Theory and The Loud Family
- Mano Murthy, composer
- Dave Nachmanoff, award-winning American folk singer-songwriter
- Paris, rapper
- Lindsey Pavao, contestant on the second season of The Voice
- DJ Shadow (real name Joshua Davis), music producer, DJ, and songwriter
- Sholi, indie rock band
- Kendra Smith, musician
- Cadence Spalding, educator, vocalist, instrumentalist and composer
- Donnette Thayer, musician
- Thin White Rope, indie rock band
- Russ Tolman, guitarist for True West
- Stuart Michael Thomas, film composer
- Joyo Velarde, hip hop and pop singer
- Steve Wynn, musician

=== Literature ===
- Wendy Barker, poet
- Howard Beck, sports journalist
- Clare Bell, British author in the United States best known for her Ratha series
- JaNay Brown-Wood, children's book author
- Kevin Clark, poet and critic
- Kira Cochrane, feminist journalist and writer
- Costa Dillon, writer
- Heinz Insu Fenkl, novelist, editor, translator and folklorist, M.A.
- Karen Joy Fowler, science fiction author
- Amy Gutierrez, sports journalist
- Theodore Hamm, author
- Deborah Harkness, The New York Times best-selling author
- Lauren Kate, novelist
- Matthew Kennedy, writer and film historian
- Gus Lee, author
- Regina Lynn, sex columnist
- Marilyn Nelson, poet, translator and children's book author
- John D. Nesbitt, western writer and literature and language professor
- Hans Ostrom, poet, novelist, and scholar, author of The Coast Starlight
- Louis Owens, novelist and scholar
- Chris Ransick, writer of literary fiction and poetry
- Shawna Yang Ryan, novelist, author of Water Ghosts (2009) and Green Island (2016)
- Max Schott, author of short stories
- Maris Soule, author of romance and romantic suspense novels, mysteries, and short stories
- Anthony Swofford, author
- James Van Pelt, science fiction author
- April Halprin Wayland, author, poet, and teacher
- Mark Wisniewski, Pushcart Prize winner and Best American Short Stories author

=== Film and television ===
- Craig Baldwin, experimental filmmaker
- Jan Gan Boyd, actress
- Michele Boyd, actress
- Debbie Lee Carrington, actress
- Justin Chu Cary, actor
- Porter Duong, actress
- Sonya Eddy, actress
- Larry Ferguson, screenwriter
- Carol Flint, TV producer, ER
- Michael Gaston, actor
- Terisa Greenan, film producer, director, and actress
- Natasha Halevi, actress
- Fereshta Kazemi, Afghan-American film actress
- Kristie Macosko Krieger, film producer
- Hiep Thi Le, Vietnamese-American actress
- Guji Lorenzana, actor
- Christopher Markus, Emmy Award-winning screenwriter known for Captain America: The First Avenger, The Winter Soldier, and Civil War, and Avengers: Infinity War and Endgame
- Kelly Masterson, screenwriter
- Stephen McFeely, Emmy Award-winning screenwriter known for Captain America: The First Avenger, The Winter Soldier, and Civil War, and Avengers: Infinity War and Endgame
- Ilan Mitchell-Smith, actor
- Matthew Moy, actor
- Richa Moorjani, actress
- Sue Murphy, stand-up comedian
- Conan Nolan, political reporter
- Grant Rosenberg, television writer and producer
- Scott Rubenstein, screenwriter
- Tareq Salahi, winery owner and television personality
- Kate Tsui, actress and singer
- John Vickery, stage and film actor known for his work in Babylon 5 and Star Trek
- Sal Viscuso, actor
- Bergen Williams, actress
- Eric Womack, actor and producer
- Martin Yan, chef, host of television show Yan Can Cook

=== Comedy ===
- Bruce Baum, comedian
- Tim Lee, comedian
- Hasan Minhaj, comedian

=== Other ===
- Jenny Cho, broadcaster
- Jenn Im, fashion and beauty vlogger
- Tiffany Lam, beauty queen, Miss Hong Kong 2002
- Mike Pondsmith, game designer
- Henry Wofford, SportsNet Central anchor/reporter for Comcast SportsNet in San Francisco

== Athletics ==
UC Davis Athletics Alumni

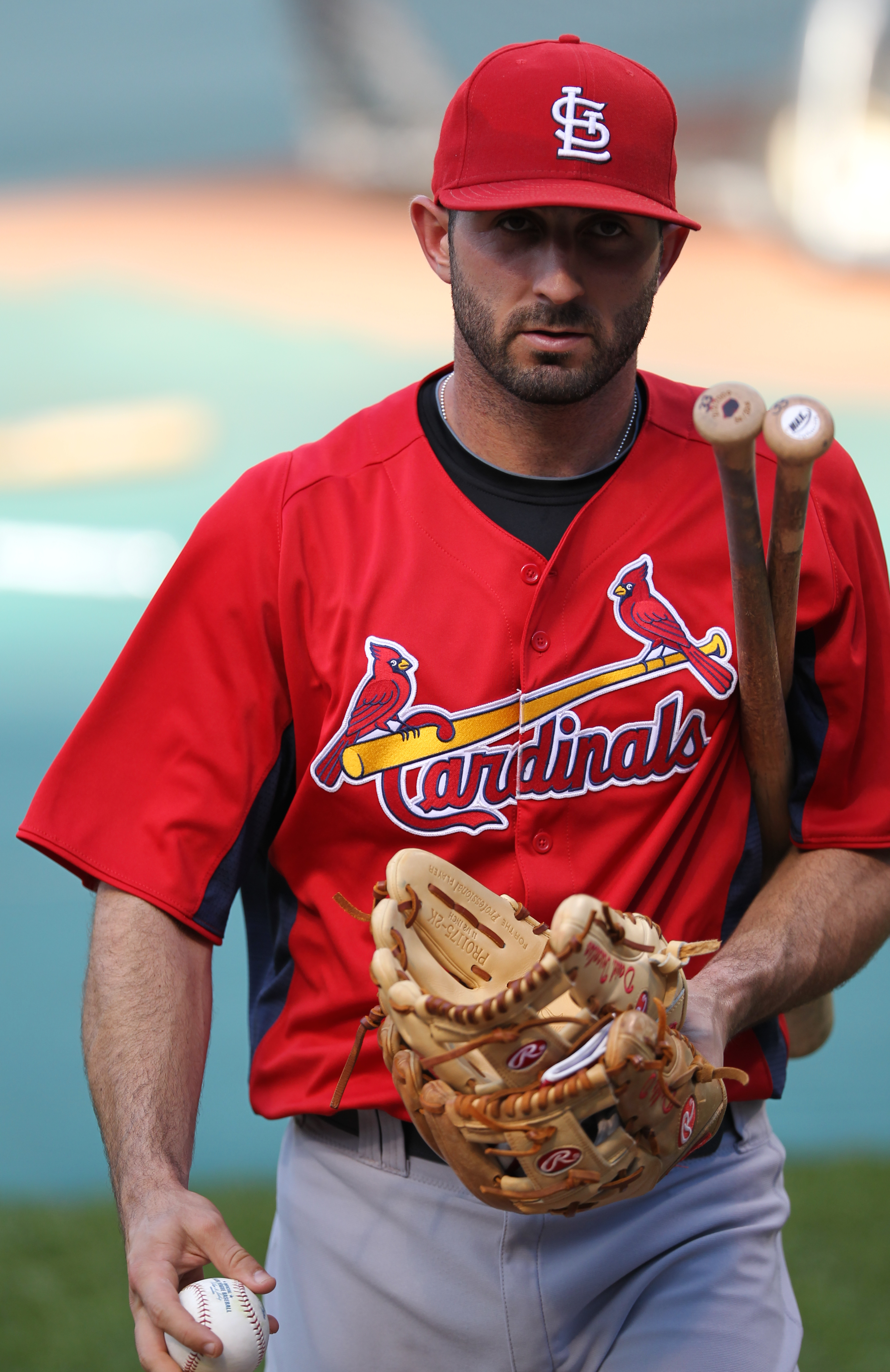
Daniel Descalso, B.A. – professional baseball infielder

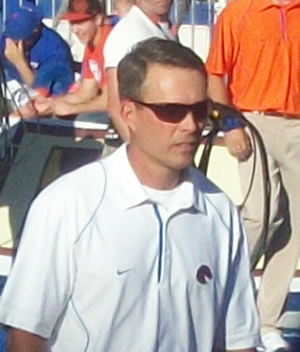
Chris Petersen, B.A., M.A. – coach

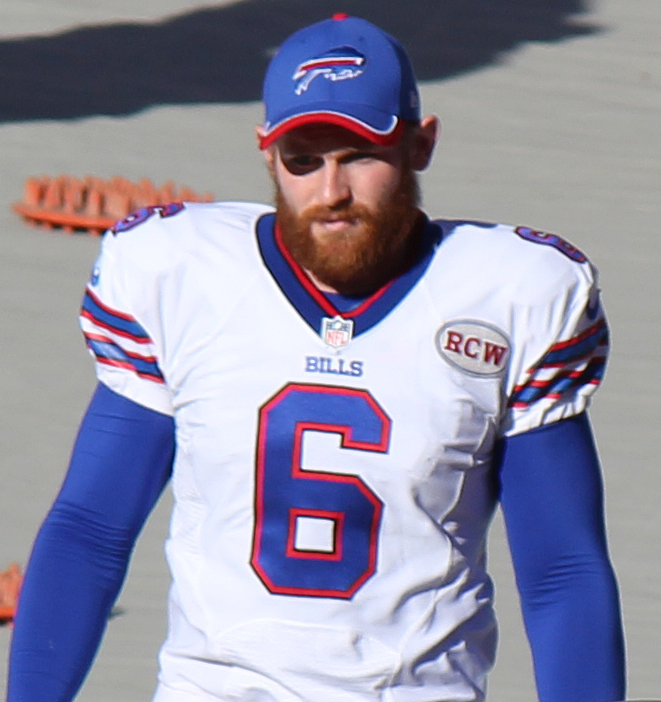
Colton Schmidt – American football punter

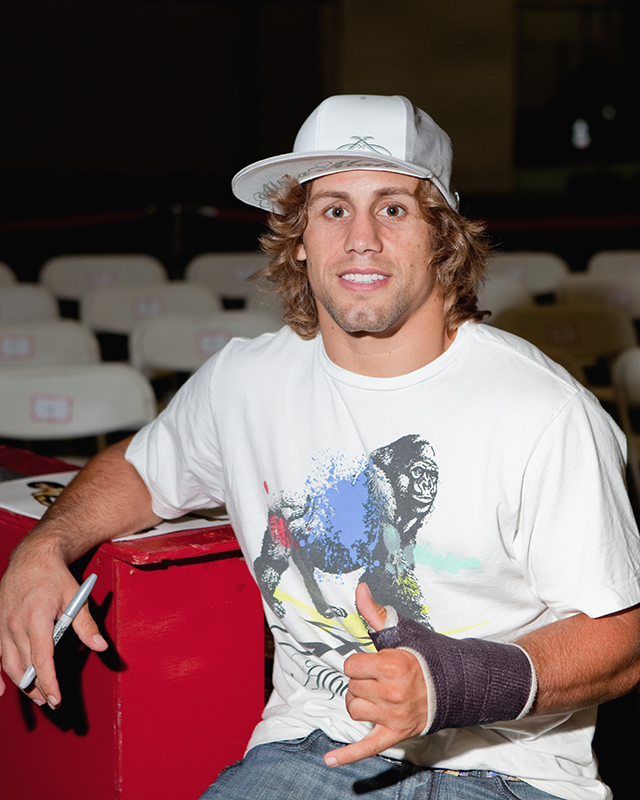
Urijah Faber, B.A. – mixed martial artist

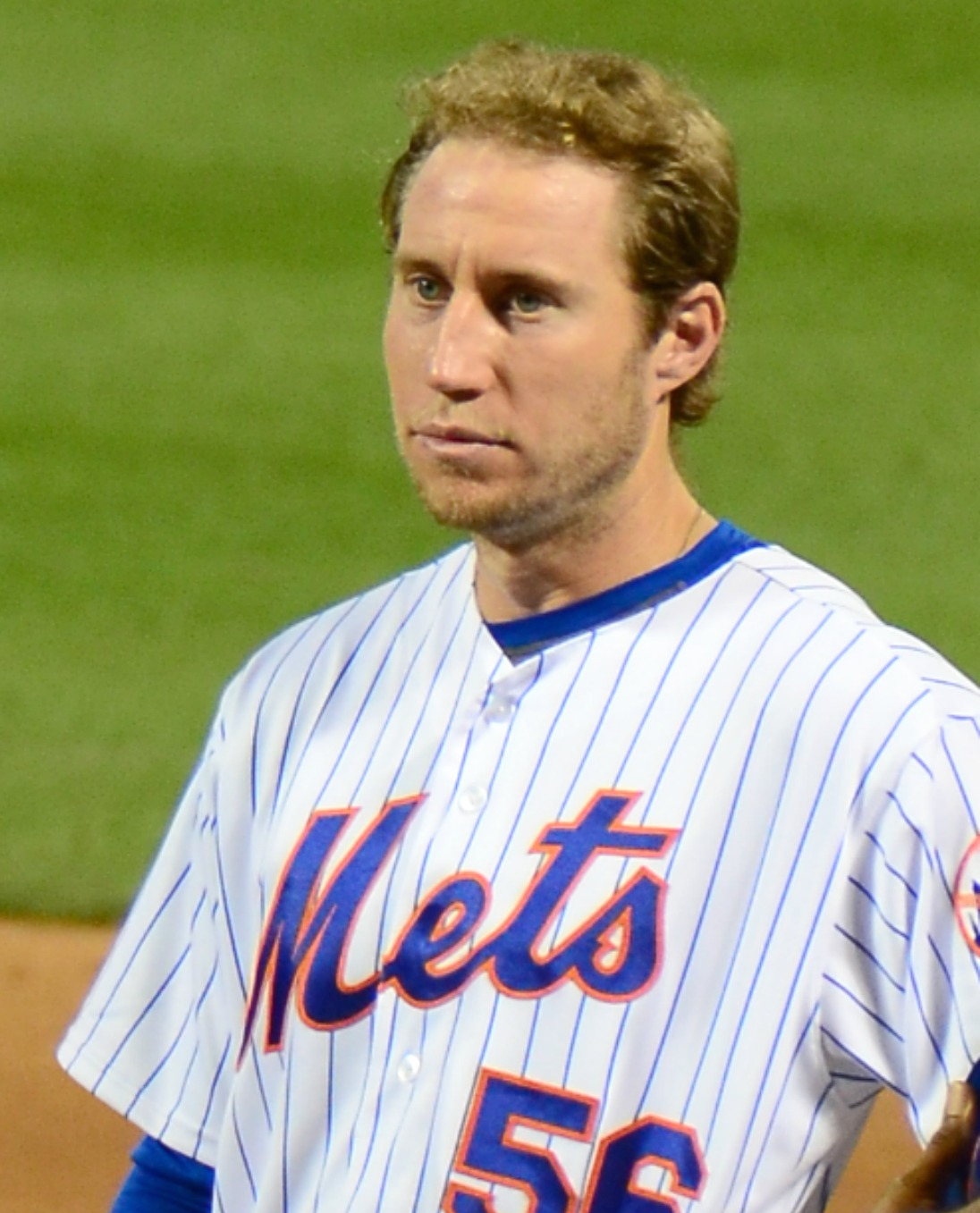
Ty Kelly – professional baseball utility player

=== Olympians ===
- Emily Azevedo, bobsledder in 2010 Winter Olympics
- Cara-Beth Burnside, snowboarder at the 1998 Winter Olympics
- Alphonse Burnand, gold medalist in sailing
- Cathy Carr, gold medalist swimmer at the 1972 Summer Olympics
- Kim Conley, long distance runner in 2012 and 2016 Summer Olympics
- Carrie Johnson, sprint canoer at 2004, 2008, and 2012 Summer Olympics
- Terry Kubicka, figure skater, 1976 US National Champion, competitor at 1976 Winter Olympics, first and only skater to perform legal backflip
- Cyndy Poor, runner at 1976 Summer Olympics
- Brita Sigourney, freestyle skier in 2014 and 2018 Winter Olympics
- Colby Slater, two-time gold medalist in rugby
- Peter Snell, three-time gold medalist in running
- Linda Somers, marathon runner in 1996 Olympics
- Seth Weil, rower at 2016 Summer Olympics
- Scott Weltz, swimmer at 2012 Summer Olympics

=== Baseball ===
- Joe Biagini, pitcher for Toronto Blue Jays
- Steve Brown, MLB pitcher
- Daniel Descalso, infielder for the Arizona Diamondbacks
- Eddie Gamboa, pitcher for Tampa Bay Rays
- Marco Grifantini, pitcher for Toronto Blue Jays
- Ty Kelly, American-Israeli former utility player for the New York Mets
- Matt Vaughn, head coach for the UC Davis Aggies baseball team
- Rich Waltz, TV announcer, Miami Marlins, MLB Network, and CBS Sports

=== Basketball ===
- Joshua Fox, player for Frankston Blues
- Corey Hawkins, professional basketball player
- Brynton Lemar (born 1995), American-born Jamaican basketball player for Hapoel Jerusalem of the Israeli Basketball Premier League
- Chima Moneke, basketball player for Saski Baskonia of the ACB league and the EuroLeague
- Mark Payne, professional basketball player
- Jason Rabedeaux, college basketball coach; head coach of the UTEP Miners 1999–2002
- Josh Ritchart, basketball player
- Dedrique Taylor, college basketball head coach for Cal State Fullerton

=== Football ===
- Nick Aliotti, defensive coordinator for University of Oregon
- Mike Bellotti, former head football coach for the University of Oregon
- Rolf Benirschke, placekicker for the San Diego Chargers of the NFL
- Bob Biggs, former head coach for UC Davis
- Chris Carter, former wide receiver for Seattle Seahawks
- Jonathan Compas, former NFL offensive lineman, Tampa Bay Buccaneers
- Kevin Daft, offensive coordinator for UC Davis
- Bo Eason, safety for the Houston Oilers of the NFL
- Daniel Fells, tight end for the Denver Broncos
- Bakari Grant, wide receiver for Calgary Stampeders
- Mark Grieb, quarterback for the San Jose Sabercats of the Arena Football League
- Daryl Gross, executive director of Intercollegiate Athletics, California State University, Los Angeles
- Nathaniel Hackett, offensive coordinator for the Buffalo Bills
- Ejiro Evero defensive coordinator for the Denver Broncos
- Paul Hackett, former head coach for University of Pittsburgh and University of Southern California
- Dan Hawkins, former head coach for the University of Colorado, Boise State and UC Davis Aggies football
- Khari Jones, Arena Football League and Canadian Football League quarterback and sports reporter
- Bryan Lee-Lauduski, former quarterback for Iowa Barnstormers
- Brad Lekkerkerker, offensive lineman for the Oakland Raiders of the NFL
- Cory Lekkerkerker, offensive lineman for the Los Angeles Chargers of the NFL
- Chris Mandeville, defensive back
- Rich Martini, former wide receiver for Oakland Raiders
- Casey Merrill, NFL defensive end
- Mike Moroski, NFL quarterback for the Atlanta Falcons and San Francisco 49ers
- Ken O'Brien, 11-year quarterback for the New York Jets and Philadelphia Eagles, first round selection in 1983 NFL draft
- J. T. O'Sullivan, former quarterback for the New Orleans Saints and Cincinnati Bengals
- Chris Petersen, former head coach for the University of Washington and Boise State
- Frank Scalercio, former head coach for Sonoma State Cossacks
- Colton Schmidt, punter for the Buffalo Bills
- Kermit Schmidt, NFL running back
- Elliot Vallejo, former player for Oakland Raiders
- Demario Warren, former head coach for Southern Utah Thunderbirds
- Mike Wise, NFL defensive end

=== Golf ===
- Brad Bell, professional golfer from Sacramento, California
- Scott Gordon, professional golfer who plays on the PGA Tour
- Matt Marshall, professional golfer from Carlton, Oregon
- Demi Runas, professional golfer who plays on the LPGA Tour

=== Soccer ===
- Max Arfsten, soccer player
- Quincy Amarikwa, former MLS player
- Ramon Martin Del Campo, retired Mexican soccer player
- Dirk Denkers, retired American soccer player who spent one season in both the NASL and MISL
- Joe Dickerson, MLS and FIFA international referee
- Ahmad Hatifi, current international soccer player for Afghanistan and a professional with the Oakland Stompers
- Elliott Hord, Sacramento Republic FC U-14 coach and former professional soccer player
- Nabilai Kibunguchy, professional soccer player and Kenyan international
- Nicolas Platter, goalkeeper coach for North Carolina FC
- Matthew Sheldon, player for Detroit City FC
- Jerome Watson, former U.S. soccer forward
- Matt Wiesenfarth, soccer player

=== Wrestling ===
- Urijah Faber, wrestler; retired professional mixed martial artist, formerly WEC featherweight champion and UFC bantamweight contender
- John Hennigan, professional wrestler known for his time in WWE as Johnny Nitro and John Morrison
- Tim Lajcik, retired mixed martial artist, stuntman, and actor

=== Other ===
- Alycia Moulton, tennis player
- Dave Scott, 6-time champion at Ironman World Championship
- Shiva Vashishat, cricket player

== Business ==
UC Davis Business Alumni

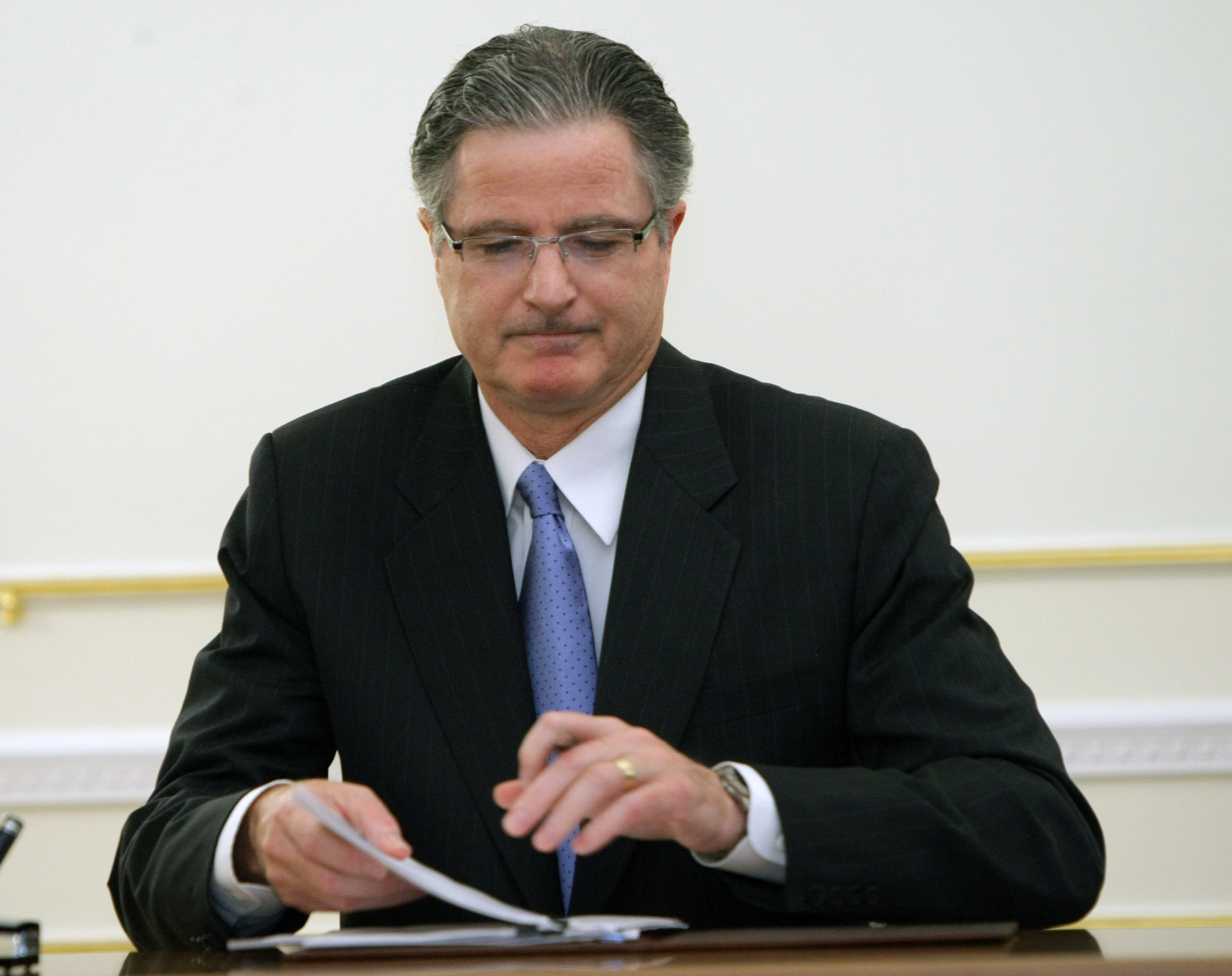
John Watson, B.A. 1978 – CEO of Chevron

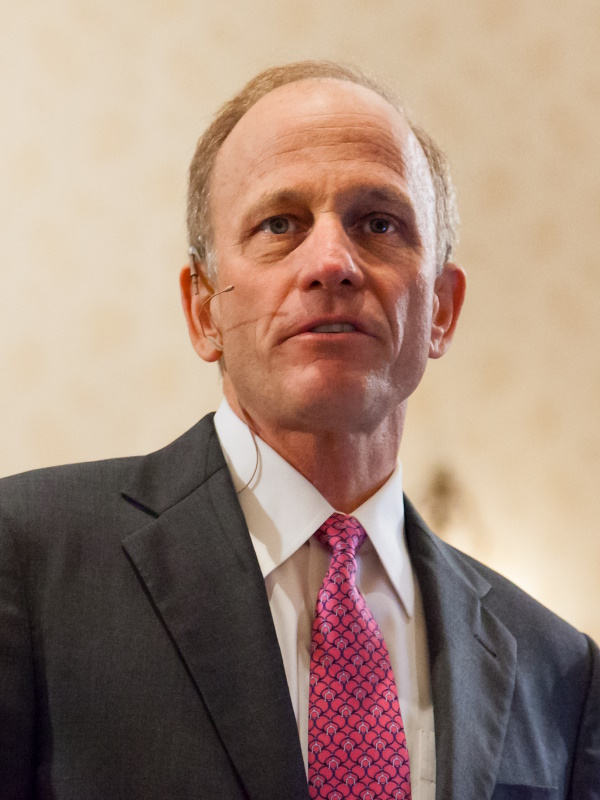
Robert B. Tucker, B.A. 1976 – author, consultant, and professional speaker

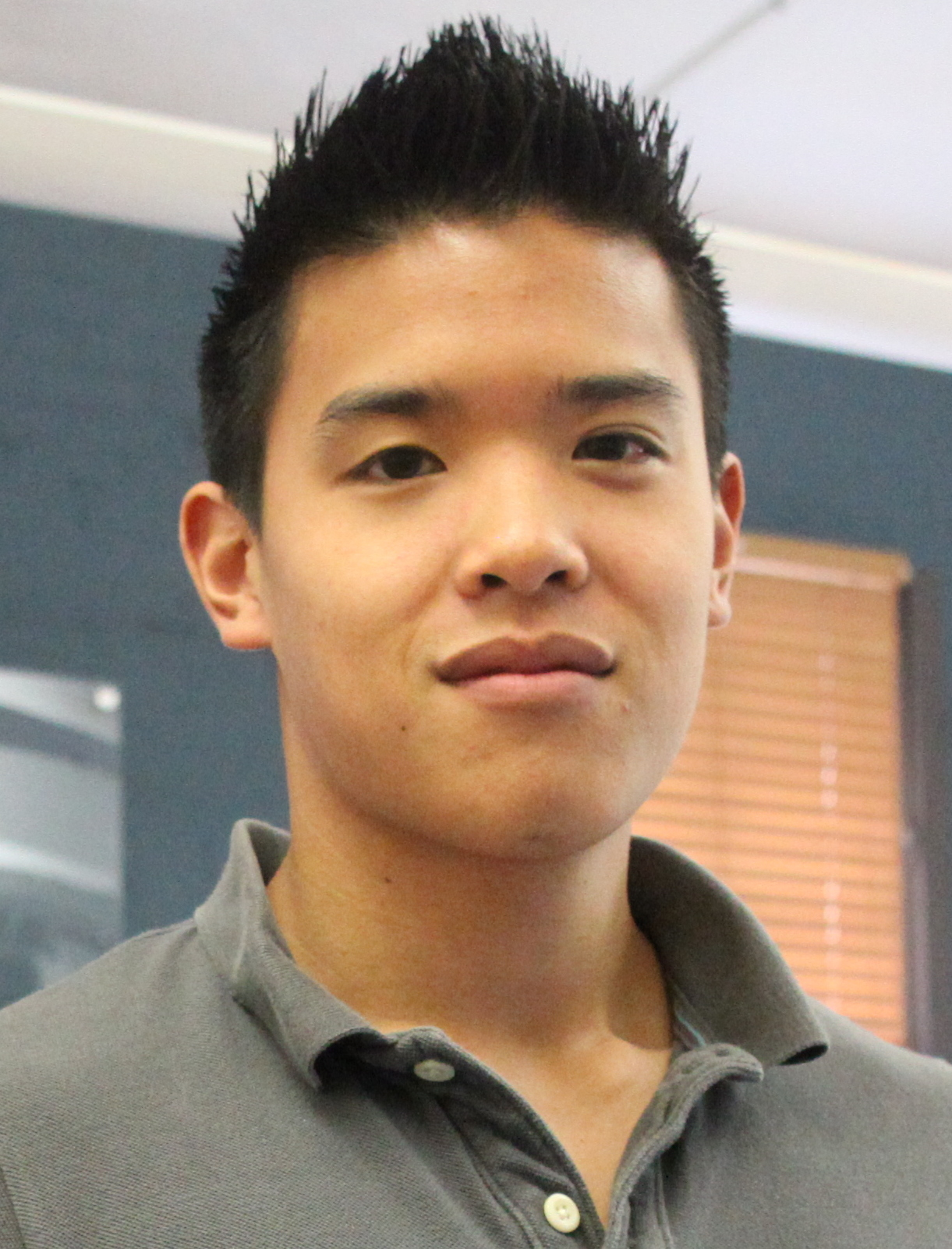
Daniel Ha – founder and CEO of Disqus

- Allison Arieff, senior content lead at IDEO, co-founder and former editor of Dwell magazine
- William L. Ballhaus, CEO of Blackboard, Inc.
- Riley P. Bechtel, billionaire, CEO of Bechtel
- Diane Bryant, COO of Google Cloud
- Alfred Chuang, co-founder and CEO of BEA Systems
- Lauren Elliott, internet entrepreneur, video game designer, co-designer of Carmen Sandiego game series
- Sean Ellis, founder of Qualaroo, coined growth hacking
- Ron Erickson, co-founder of Microrim, GlobalVision, Inc., and Egghead Software
- Bob Foster, past president of Southern California Edison; former Mayor of Long Beach, California
- Maurice J. Gallagher, Jr., CEO and chairman of Allegiant Air
- Adriana Gascoigne, CEO of Girls in Tech
- Kimberly Guilfoyle, Court TV and Fox News Channel anchor; ABC, CNN, and Fox News legal analyst/commentator
- Daniel Ha, co-founder and CEO of Disqus
- Oran B. Hesterman, president and chief executive officer of Fair Food Network
- Jeffrey Katz, CEO, NexTag; ex-CEO, Leapfrog; ex-CEO and founder, Orbitz
- Mike Kim, Head of Google for Startups (Asia-Pacific)
- Peter Lavelle, journalist, host of CrossTalk on the English-language TV channel of RT
- Jason Lucash, inventor and founder of Origaudio, Time Magazine's Top 50 Inventions of 2009, winner on ABC's show Shark Tank, and Entrepreneur's "Entrepreneur of the Year" for 2012
- Ken Mercurio, author and former nutrition labeling director at Nestle USA
- Jani Macari Pallis, CEO of Cislunar Aerodynamics, professor at University of Bridgeport
- Mark Publicover, CEO and founder of JumpSport, inventor of the first affordable trampoline safety net enclosure
- Keith Robinson, co-owner of the Hawaiian island of Niihau
- Ryan Roslansky, CEO of LinkedIn
- Zohra Sarwari, Muslim author, business coach, entrepreneur, and international speaker
- Michael A. Schwarz, chief economist at Microsoft
- Stratton Sclavos, chairman of the board, president and chief executive officer of VeriSign
- Tanya Seaman, founder of PhillyCarShare
- Rinki Sethi, former chief information security officer at Twitter
- Krishna Subramanian, entrepreneur, angel investor, and co-founder of BlueLithium
- Jeffrey Tarrant, founder of Candescent Films
- Thomas J. Tierney, chairman of eBay
- John Watson, former CEO of Chevron (2010–2018)

== Government ==
UC Davis Government Alumni

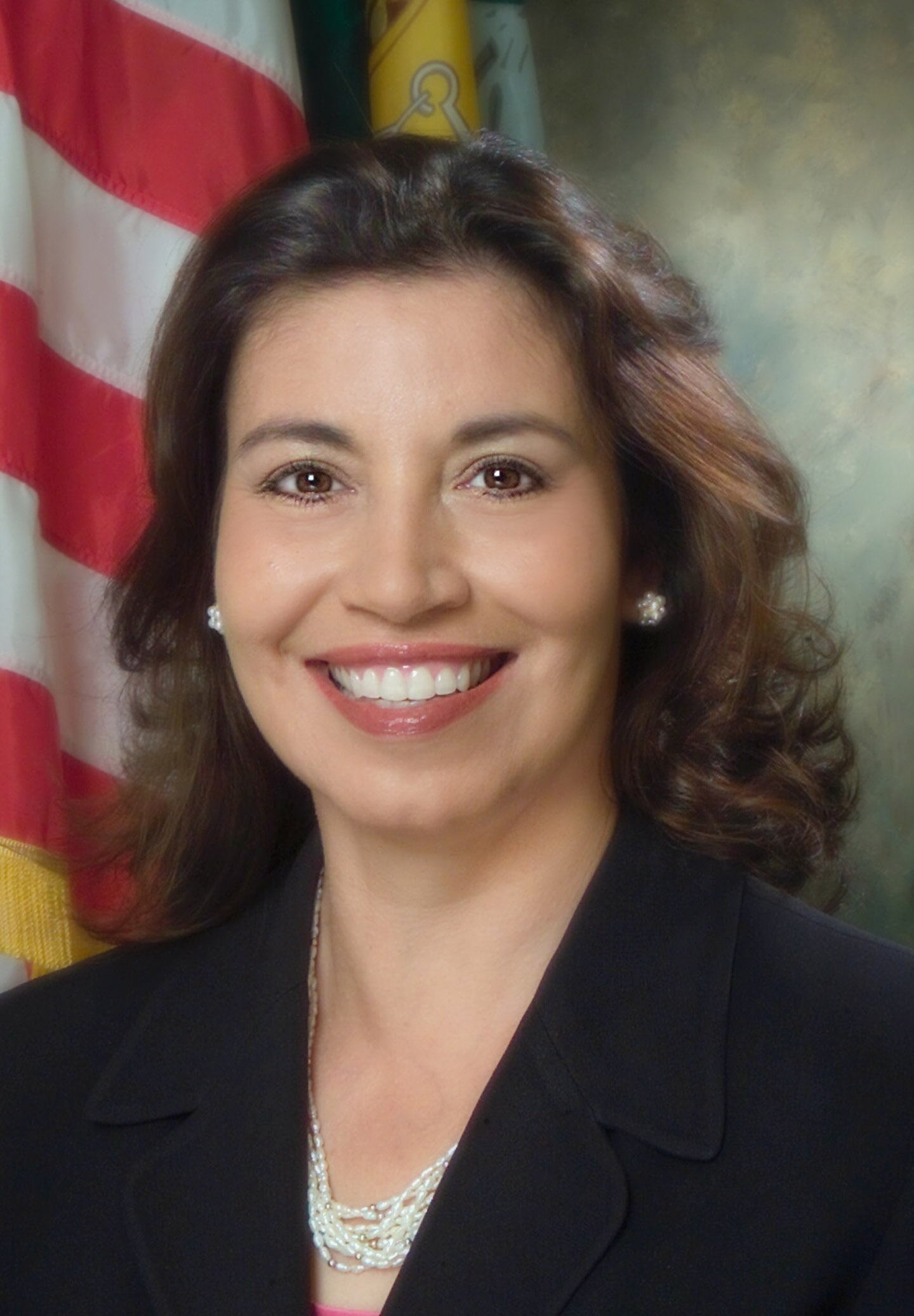
Anna Escobedo Cabral, B.A. 1987 – treasurer of the United States

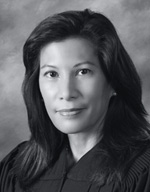
Tani Cantil-Sakauye, B.A. 1980, J.D. 1984 – chief justice of California

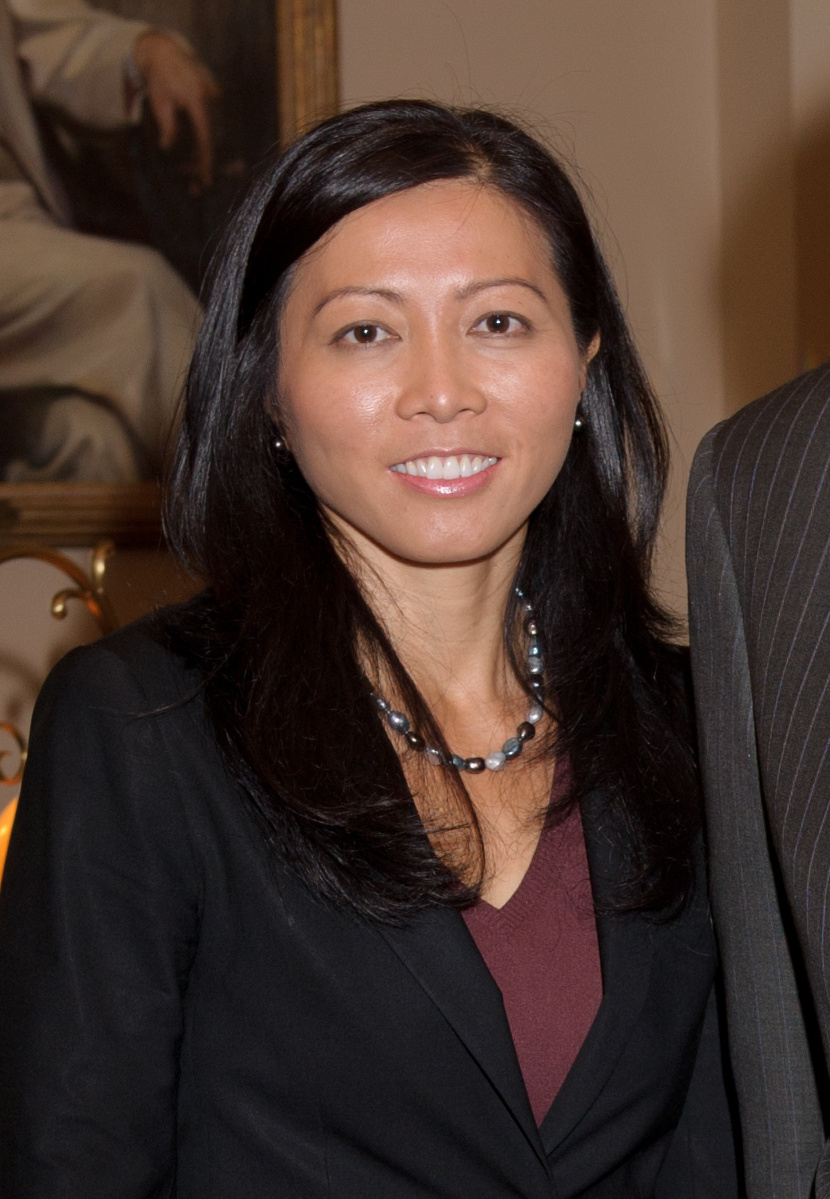
Miranda Du, B.A. 1991 – United States district judge

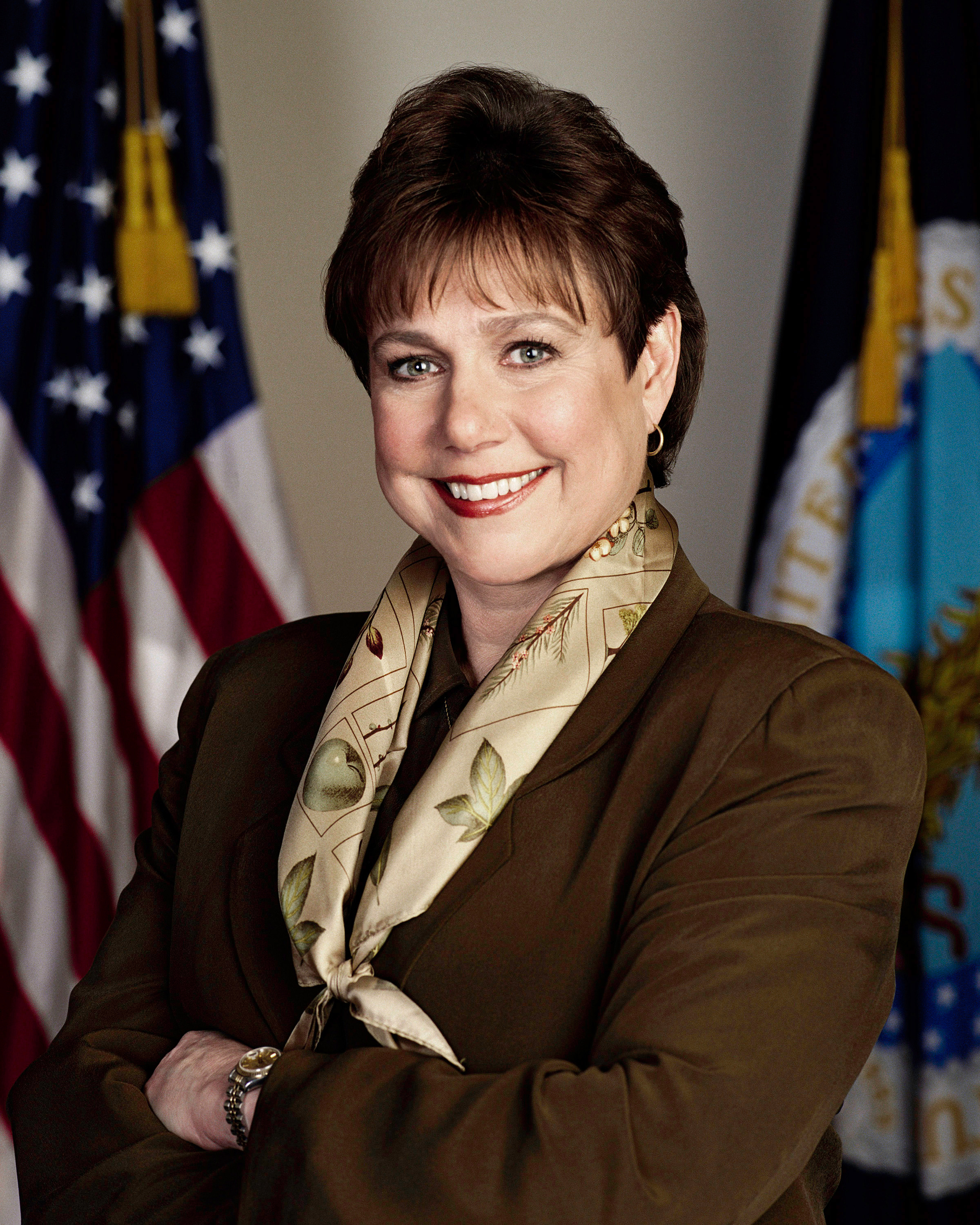
Ann Veneman, B.A. – former secretary of the United States Department of Agriculture

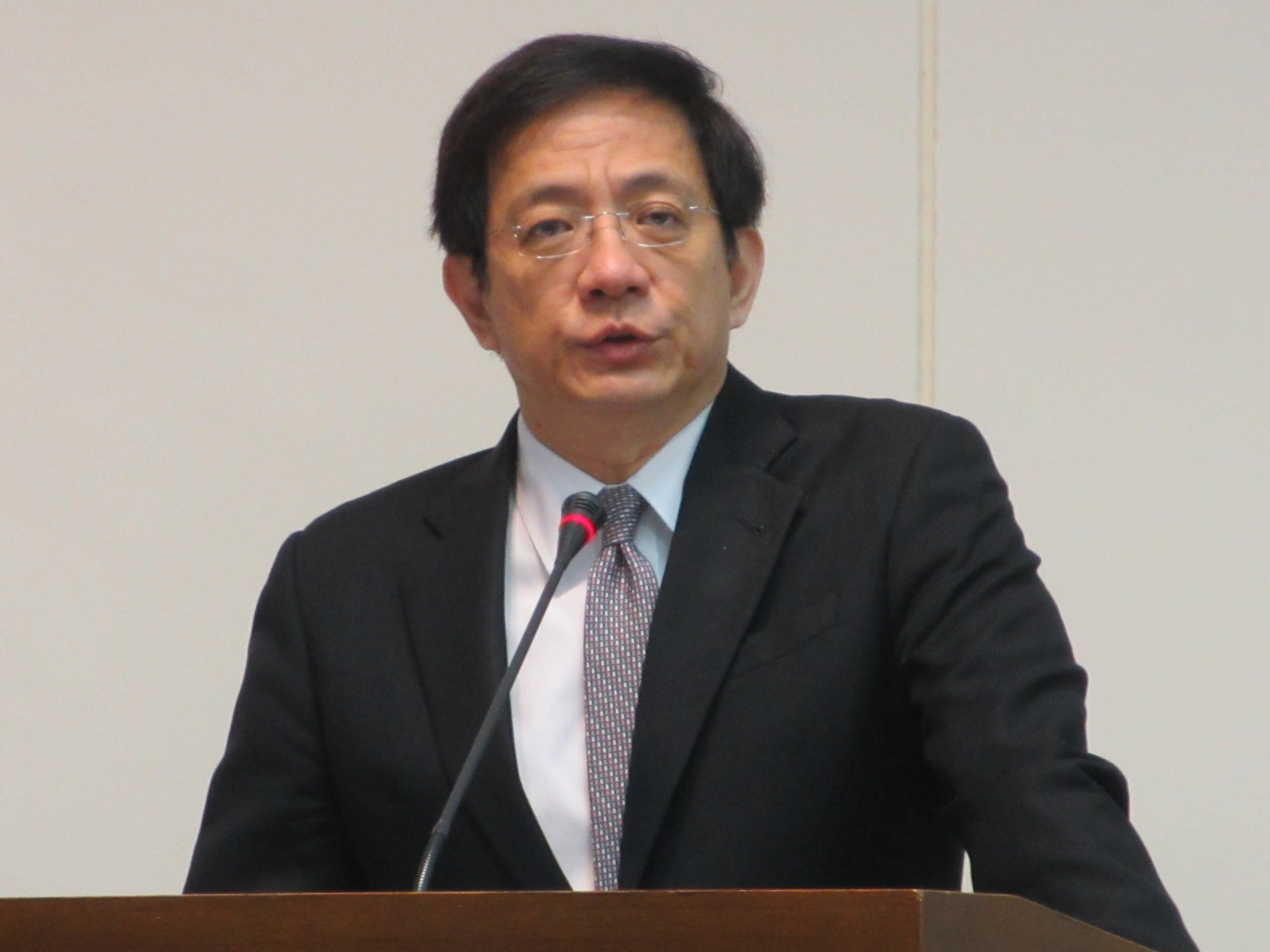
Kuan Chung-ming, M.A. 1984 – minister of the National Development Council (Taiwan)

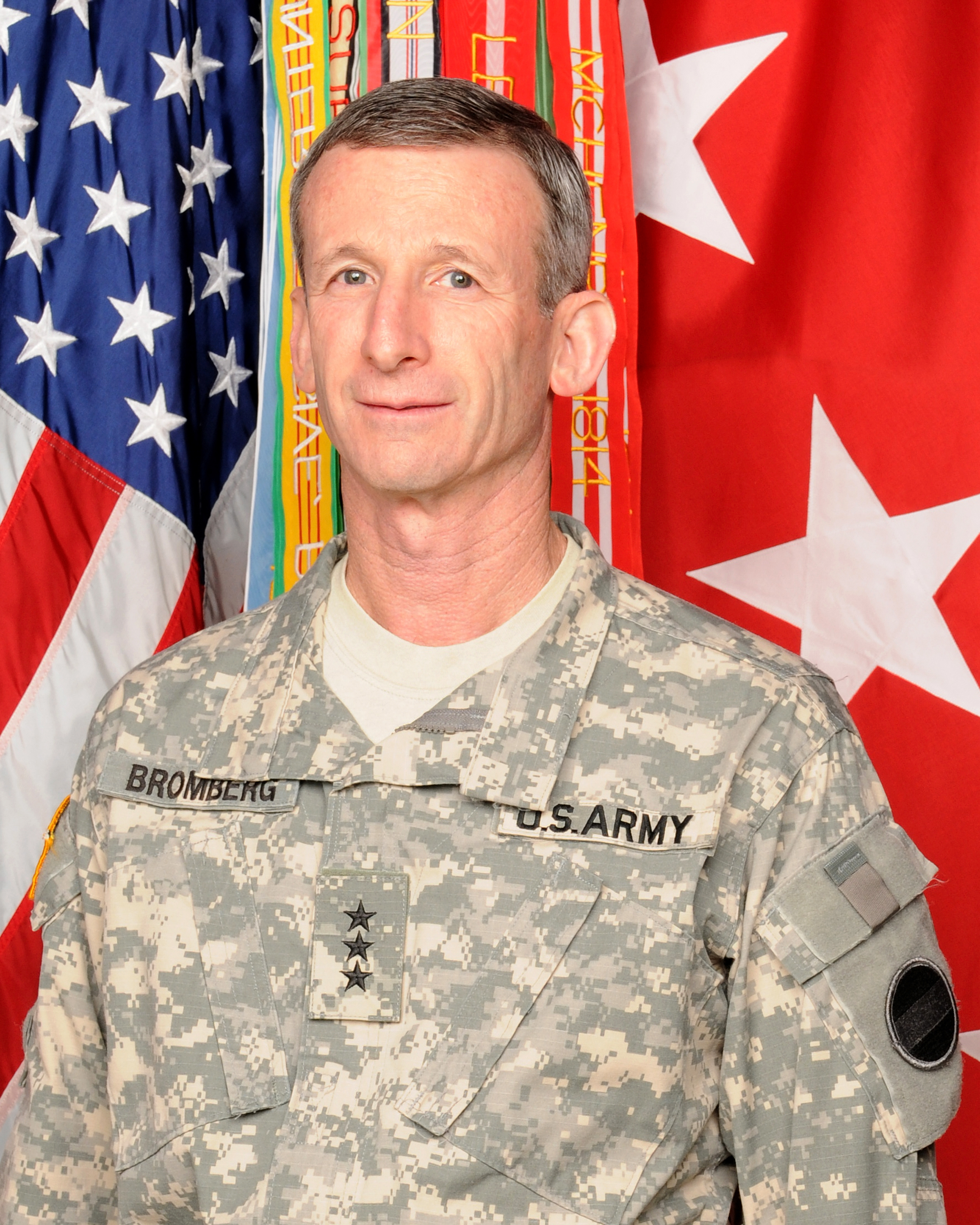
Howard B. Bromberg, B.S. – retired United States Army lieutenant general

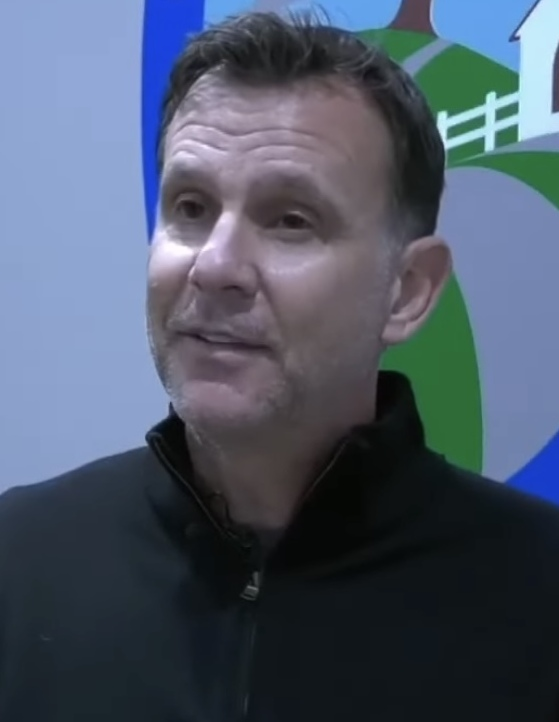
Cameron Smyth – Santa Clarita city councilman

=== Foreign officials ===
- Kuan Chung-ming, former minister of the Taiwanese National Development Council, current chair of the Department of Finance of the National Taiwan University
- James Lindesay-Bethune, 16th Earl of Lindsay, Scottish nobleman
- Mohsen Nourbakhsh, former governor of the Central Bank of Iran
- Mari Pangestu, Indonesian Minister of Tourism and Creative Economy
- Emais Roberts, Palauan politician and physician
- Roberto Sebastian, former secretary of the Department of Agriculture (Philippines)
- Kamal Stino, former deputy prime minister of Egypt
- Isabel García Tejerina, former Ministry of Agriculture, Food and Environment (Spain)
- Rosanna Wong, former convenor of the Executive Council of Hong Kong

=== Federal government ===
- Anna Escobedo Cabral, treasurer of the United States (2005-2009)
- Janice Eberly, former chief economist of the United States Department of the Treasury
- Michael Faulkender, U.S. deputy secretary of the treasury
- David J. Kappos, former director of the Patent and Trademark Office
- Julie MacDonald, former deputy assistant secretary for Fish and Wildlife and Parks at the United States Department of the Interior
- Lynn Okagaki, commissioner of Education Research in the Institute of Education Sciences
- Paul M. Igasaki, chair and chief judge of the Administrative Review Board at the U.S. Department of Labor
- Steven J. Law, U.S. deputy secretary of labor
- Jane A. Restani, judge on the United States Court of International Trade
- Richard Rominger, U.S. deputy secretary of agriculture
- Ann Veneman, former secretary of the U.S. Department of Agriculture, 2001–2005, later executive director of UNICEF
- Sue Ellen Wooldridge, former United States assistant attorney general

=== Ambassadors ===
- Leslie A. Bassett, U.S. ambassador to Paraguay
- Kathleen A. FitzGibbon, U.S. ambassador to Niger
- Anthony Godfrey, U.S. ambassador to Serbia
- Sheila Gwaltney, U.S. ambassador to Kyrgyzstan
- Scot Marciel, U.S. ambassador to Myanmar
- Erin Elizabeth McKee, U.S. ambassador to the Solomon Islands
- Howard Van Vranken, U.S. ambassador to Botswana

=== United States representatives ===
- Cal Dooley, former congressman, also president and CEO of National Food Processors Association
- Dave Loebsack, former congressman, Iowa, 2nd district
- George Miller, former congressman, California, 7th district
- Jimmy Panetta, congressman, California, 19th district
- Kim Schrier, Congresswoman, Washington, 8th district
- Jackie Speier, former congresswoman, California, 12th district (2008–2013), 14th district (2013–2023)

=== State government ===
- Luis Alejo, former California state assemblymember, 28th District; former mayor of Watsonville, California
- Marie Alvarado-Gil, California state senator, 4th district
- Charles Calderon, politician who served in both chambers of the California State Legislature
- Anthony Cannella, former California state senator, 12th District, former mayor of Ceres, California
- Tani Cantil-Sakauye, 28th chief justice of California
- Rebecca Cohn, former California state assemblymember, 24th District
- Dave Cortese, California state senator, 15th district, former Santa Clara County supervisor, former San Jose vice mayor/city councilmember
- Ellen Corbett, former California state senator and assemblymember, 10th District
- Jill Derby, former elected regent for the Nevada System of Higher Education
- Delaine Eastin, 25th state superintendent of Public Instruction of California
- Robert Fong, former member of the Sacramento City Council
- Dario Frommer, former California state assemblymember, 43rd District, Los Angeles
- Jeff Gorell, former California state assemblymember, 37th and 44th Districts
- Jani Iwamoto, former member of the Utah Senate, 4th District
- A. G. Kawamura, former California secretary of food and agriculture
- Alex Lee, California state assemblymember, 24th and 25th districts; youngest legislator in state history
- David C. Long, former member of the Indiana State Senate, 16th District
- Michael Machado, former California state assemblymember, 8th District
- Kerry Mazzoni, former California state secretary of education and assemblymember, 6th district
- Tony Miller, former California secretary of state
- Terry Morrow, former member of Minnesota House of Representatives, 23A District
- Pedro Nava, former California state assemblymember, 35th District
- Harold J. Powers, 36th lieutenant governor of California
- Ron Raikes, former senator in the Nebraska Legislature, 25th District
- Kevin Shelley, 28th California secretary of state
- Cameron Smyth, Santa Clarita city councilman and former California assemblymember, 38th District
- Charles Starr, politician who served in the Oregon State Senate and House of Representatives
- Arthur Torres, former California state senator, 24th District, and assemblymember, 56th District
- Phil Wyman, former California state senator, 16th District, and assemblymember, 34th District

=== Mayors ===
- Ruthlane Uy Asmundson, former mayor of Davis, first Filipina mayor
- London Breed, mayor of San Francisco, California
- Heather Fargo, former mayor of Sacramento, California
- Elihu Harris, 46th mayor of Oakland, California
- Darrell Steinberg, mayor of Sacramento, California

=== Judges ===
- Tony Agbayani, judge of the Superior Court of San Joaquin County, California
- Miranda Du, district judge on the United States District Court for the District of Nevada
- Delbert Gee, retired judge of the Superior Court of California in Alameda County
- Sharon L. Gleason, district judge on the United States District Court for the District of Alaska
- Paul W. Grimm, district judge on the United States District Court for the District of Maryland
- Paula A. Nakayama, retired associate justice of the Supreme Court of Hawaii
- Amy Oppenheimer, administrative law judge, California Unemployment Insurance Appeals Board
- Kristina Pickering, associate justice and former chief justice of the Supreme Court of Nevada
- Dean D. Pregerson, senior judge on the United States District Court for the Central District of California
- Jon Sands, chief federal public defender for the District of Arizona
- Craig F. Stowers, retired chief justice of the Alaska Supreme Court
- Steve White, judge of the Sacramento County Superior Court

=== Military ===
- Bradley Becker, retired United States Army lieutenant general
- Howard B. Bromberg, retired lieutenant general, United States Army deputy chief of Staff
- William H. Forster, retired United States Army lieutenant general
- Bonnie Burnham Potter, first female physician in the Navy Medical Corps to be selected for flag rank
- John M. Wood, retired major general in the United States Air Force; former commander of the Third Air Force

=== Other ===
- Connie Chan, San Francisco District 1 supervisor, chair of the Budget Committee and candidate for Congress, CA-11
- Andrew Do, member of Orange County Board of Supervisors
- John Quoc Duong, director of the White House Initiative on Asian Americans and Pacific Islanders (AAPIs)
- Hoang Tu Duy, Vietnamese-born American democracy activist
- Joseph Gutheinz, retired NASA employee who investigated stolen and missing Moon rocks
- Eric Mar, former San Francisco District 1 supervisor and president, San Francisco Board of Education; currently professor of Asian American studies at San Francisco State University
- Paul Miyamoto, sheriff of the City and County of San Francisco
- Angela E. Oh, attorney, teacher, and public lecturer best known for her role as spokesperson for the Korean-American community
- Mindell Penn, retired Richmond, California city councilwoman and PG&E executive
- Jim Rogers, former city councilmember for Richmond, California
- Larry Rogers, Jr., commissioner on the Cook County Board of Review
- Katy Tang, former San Francisco District 4 supervisor
- Monika Kalra Varma, director of Robert F. Kennedy Center for Justice and Human Rights

== Winemaking ==
- Amy Aiken, entrepreneur and winemaker
- Alberto Antonini, senior winemaker for the wineries of the Antinori and the Frescobaldi
- Kristen Barnhisel, winemaker
- Daniel Baron, winemaker
- Christian Moueix, French winemaker and president of JP Moueix
- Heidi Barrett, California winemaker and consultant
- Cathy Corison, winemaker
- Sarah Gott, winemaker
- Kathryn Kennedy, California winemaker
- Mia Klein, winemaker
- David Lake, Washington wine pioneer and Master of Wine
- Steve Matthiasson, California viticulturist and winemaker
- Aaron Pott, Napa Valley consultant winemaker
- Carol Shelton, winemaker
- Kay Simon, Washington winemaker

== Miscellaneous ==
- Dennis Banks, Native American leader
- John Lawrence Goheen, missionary and educator
- Peter A. Griffin, blackjack expert, one of the original seven members of the Blackjack Hall of Fame
- Jan Hamrin, founded the non-profit Center for Resource Solutions
- Paul Holes, former cold-case investigator for the Contra Costa County district attorney; known for his contributions to solving the Golden State Killer
- Maria Kang, fitness advocate and founder of the No Excuse Mom movement
- Randy Lew, professional poker player
- Laura Liswood, secretary general of the Council of Women World Leaders
- Luis Scott-Vargas, Magic: The Gathering player
- John Dragon Young, Hong Kong scholar of Chinese history

== See also ==
- List of University of California, Davis faculty
