= Michael Wang (scientist) =

American scientist

- Education: China Agricultural University (BA), University of California, Davis (PhD)
- Known for: Vehicle & Fuel Technologies
- Awards: SAE Fellow, DOE Joint Hydrogen and Fuel Cells and Vehicle Technologies Programs Award, DOE Hydrogen Program R&D Award
- Scientific career
- Workplaces: Argonne National Laboratory
- Thesis: The Use of a Marketable Permit System for Light-Duty Vehicle Emission Control (1994)
- Website: https://www.anl.gov/profile/michael-wang

Michael Wang is director of the Systems Assessment Center of the Energy Systems Division at the Argonne National Laboratory. He is also a faculty associate in the Energy Policy Institute at The University of Chicago; a senior fellow at the Northwestern-Argonne Institute of Science and Engineering at Northwestern University.

Wang's research and expertise are in evaluating the energy and environmental impacts of vehicle technologies, transportation fuels, energy systems, and buildings technologies; assessing the market potentials of advanced vehicle technologies and new fuels; and examining transportation development in emerging economies such as China. He developed and applied the life-cycle analysis methods to the transportation sector. His contributions to mobility technology have been recognized by several institutions, including the U.S. Department of Energy and the Society of Automotive Engineers, which named Wang a fellow in 2019.

At Argonne, Wang leads development of the GREET (Greenhouse gases, Regulated Emissions, and Energy use in Technologies) model, a popular modeling tool for full life-cycle analysis of vehicle technologies, transportation fuels, energy systems, and building technologies. Over 43,000 individuals and organizations around the world–including governmental and non-governmental organizations, universities, automotive companies and energy companies–use GREET.

Wang has also advised several boards and committees. He served on the board of the San Francisco–based Energy Foundation and on the board of the Washington D.C.–based International Council for Clean Transportation. He is currently sits on the advisory board of the Institute of Transportation Studies of University of California, Davis. He was also the former chair of the Subcommittee on the International Aspects of Transportation Energy and Alternative Fuels of the U.S. Transportation Research Board.

== Early life and education ==
Wang received his Ph.D. in environmental science from the University of California, Davis in 1992. He also holds a master's degree in environmental science from UC Davis and a bachelor's degree in agricultural meteorology from the China Agricultural University.

Wang completed his postdoctoral studies at the Center for Transportation Analysis in Oak Ridge National Laboratory in 1992. He went on to join Argonne as a scientist in 1993.

== Research ==
=== Life cycle analysis and the GREET model ===
Wang leads the ongoing development of Argonne's GREET modeling tool. GREET simulates the energy use, emissions of greenhouse gases and air pollutants, and water use of vehicle technologies, fuel production options, energy systems, and buildings technologies, allowing researchers, government agencies, and companies to evaluate energy and environmental effects of various vehicle and fuel combinations and other technologies on a full life-cycle basis. GREET is being used by over 43,000 registered users worldwide. Users include governmental agencies in North America, Asia, and Europe, who uses GREET to help formulate transportation policies, such as low-carbon fuel and vehicle greenhouse gas emission regulations, and automotive companies developing environmentally sustainable vehicle technologies and fuels.

=== Conventional fuels and vehicle technologies ===
Wang has studied the energy and environmental effects of petroleum fuels and alternative fuels for use in internal combustion engine vehicles in early 1990s. He examined liquid fuels such as gasoline and diesel and gaseous fuels such as compressed natural gas and liquefied petroleum gas that are produced from petroleum and natural gas. His detailed analyses include oil and natural gas fields, petroleum refineries, and the supply chain of liquid and gaseous fuels. More recently, he has examined high octane fuels for their efficiency and emission performance and methane leakage of the natural gas supply system.

=== Biofuels and renewable fuels ===
Wang and his team at Argonne published extensively in the area of addressing energy and environmental effects of biofuels and renewable fuels including first-generation biofuels such as corn-based ethanol, soybean-based biodiesel, and sugarcane-based ethanol, second-generation biofuels such as cellulosic biomass-based biofuels, and other biofuels and renewable fuels such as algae-based biofuels, waste-to-energy technologies to produce renewable natural gas. Wang's LCA results for biofuels and renewable fuels are cited extensively by governmental agencies, companies, and researchers, shown by the fact that Wang has been repeatedly ranked among the most influential people in the biofuels field.

=== Electric, fuel cell, and hybrid electric vehicles ===
Wang first published LCA results of battery electric vehicles in late 1980s when he was in graduate school in University of California, Davis. He identified that the electricity generation types and electric vehicle efficiency were the two most important factors determining energy and environmental performance of battery electric vehicles. He first addressed different hydrogen production pathways and their effects on fuel-cell vehicle energy and environmental performance. More recently, he has worked on battery supply chains to examine energy, environmental, and economic effects of battery production, use, and recycling on the overall energy and environmental performance of battery electric vehicles.

=== Transportation development in developed and emerging economies ===
Wang has also studied how new vehicle technologies and new fuels are introduced in the U.S., developed economies and emerging economies like China. His studies explore and suggest technical and policy solutions that could help the public and private sectors in emerging countries on how to manage emissions and mitigate the environmental impact of vehicles. Wang has collaborated with international organizations such as the International Energy Agency, the International Transport Forum, the International Civil Aviation Organization and in individual countries including China, Brazil, Canada, Japan, Korea, and European Union member states.

== Honors and awards ==
- Received USCAR Team Award, 2013
- Named one of the Top 100 People in Bioenergy by Biofuels Digest, 2016, 2012, 2010
- Received DOE's Joint Hydrogen and Fuel Cells and Vehicle Technologies Programs Award in 2013
- Received DOE's Hydrogen Program R&D Award in 2008 and 2005

== Membership ==
- Fellow of the Society of Automotive Engineers, 2019
- Argonne distinguished fellow, 2016
- Member of the Transportation Energy Committee, Transportation Research Board, National Research Council, USA
