= Jeff Werber =

American veterinarian and veterinary medical journalist

- Education: Doctor of Veterinary Medicine; University of California, Davis, 1984; Bachelor of Science, Zoology; University of California, Berkeley, 1976
- Occupations: Veterinary physician veterinary medical journalist

Jeff Werber is an American veterinarian and veterinary medical journalist. Werber has hosted the television series Lassie's Pet Vet, as well as appearing as a pet-topic contributor on such programs as The Dr. Oz Show, Rachael Ray, and Fox & Friends.

== Early life ==
Werber first developed a passion for veterinary medicine during his high school days, volunteering at a local animal clinic. This experience led Werber to pursue a bachelor's degree in Zoology, which he earned from the University of California, Berkeley in 1976. He went on to earn his Veterinary degree at the University of California, Davis in 1984.

== Veterinary career ==
Werber established Century Veterinary Group in 1988, a Los Angeles, California animal hospital which he then sold to Mars/ VCA.

He was a founding officer of the Association of Veterinary Communicators. He also served as a member of the legislative committee for the California Veterinary Medical Association.

He previously served pet stores, such as Puppy Love in the Beverly Center, but the practice of selling puppy mill pets in pet stores has since been outlawed in the state of California. He has worked with the Delta Society and Canine Companions for Independence, among others.

=== Celebrity clientele ===
Werber has often referred to himself as a "Veterinarian to the Stars." Past and present celebrity clients of his include Britney Spears, Julia Roberts, Ben Affleck, Eddie Murphy, Paula Abdul, Rod Stewart, Mark Wahlberg, Patrick Dempsey, Mandy Moore, Jennifer Love Hewitt, Drea de Matteo, Ron Perlman, Lori Loughlin, Emmy Rossum, and Judy Greer.

In an interview with The Hollywood Reporter, Greer revealed her fondness of Werber's work. "I drive very far out of my way to take my dog to him because it’s worth it, and I have a feeling that everyone in the waiting room feels the same way,” adding that Werber is "interested in the least invasive and most natural remedies first.”

== Media career ==
Werber began his venture into veterinary journalism in 1987, making his television debut in as a contributor to Hour Magazine, a syndicated talk show hosted by Emmy Award-winning actor Gary Collins. He continued on as a frequent pet-topic contributor on ABC's Home Show in the early 1990s. Since then, Werber has gone on to serve as a frequent contributor to many broadcast outlets across the nation. He has served as the Pet Medical editor on multiple radio programs, and has appeared on Oprah, CNN, Fox News Channel, and MTV, among others.

=== Television host ===
In 1996, Werber gained notoriety as host of the popular Animal Planet series Petcetera. The program included segments about dogs, cats, birds and other more exotic animals. Werber often welcomed other animal experts for in-studio visits, as well as other animals. His excellence in hosting earned him a nomination for a CableACE Award in 1996.

Werber landed a new hosting opportunity in 2007 as the main personality of the PBS program Lassie's Pet Vet, a 30-minute program about pet health, lifestyle, and communities. The program often included on-location stories as well as tips from Werber that covered helpful information on topics such as traveling with your pet, pet grooming, and occasional trivia.

In 2012, Werber was slated to serve as a host on a new television series titled The Vets, a program hosted by a panel of veterinary experts that included Werber, along with veterinarians Ernie Ward, Ruth MacPete, and Justine Lee. The program was designed to raise the awareness of pet owners about pet health issues, similar in style to the popular daytime television show The Doctors. A pilot episode for the series was filmed; however, the series has yet to air.

=== Other appearances ===
In 2012, Werber appeared on The Dr. Oz Show to discuss dental hygiene in dogs. Since the beginning of 2013, Werber has appeared on local network affiliates of ABC, CBS, and Fox in Los Angeles to discuss various pet health topics. On a national level, Werber has appeared on television programs such as The Better Show and Fox & Friends. He has also been a useful resource for national news websites, including The Associated Press's Big Story and Disney's Babble.

=== Media awards ===
During his time as a contributor for pet-related stories for the CBS Morning News in Los Angeles, Werber was honored for excellence in pet coverage, winning an Emmy Award in 1997.
