= Zohra Sarwari =

Afghan-American author and entrepreneur

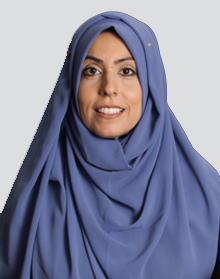
- Born: Afghanistan
- Education: AA, BA (Psych.), MBA, Master of Islamic Studies
- Occupations: International Author, International Speaker, Life and Business Coach, Entrepreneur, and Publisher
- Spouse: Married
- Website: www.zohrasarwari.com

Zohra Sarwari is an Afghan Muslim author, life and business coach, entrepreneur, and international speaker living in Orlando, Florida, United States. She is the author of more than 16 books and many E-books.

== Early life ==
Sarwari was born in Kandahar, Afghanistan and moved to America at the age of 6 with her parents. Her family spoke little English when they first arrived and started out working in low-paying jobs to make ends meet. She later attended public schools in New York, Virginia and California.

== Career ==
- In a Southern California InFocus interview she was exemplified as a working mother; homeschooling her three children while also pursuing her career. Her workload includes both running her own website offering life and business coaching services, and studying for a Bachelor of Arts degree in Islam.
- She has participated in the Meet the Author Program of ISNA She has been interviewed on Ariana International, Noor TV, and Payame Afghan TV
- Her book, 9 Steps To Achieve Your Destiny, has been reviewed in Azizah and Al-Jumuah magazines.
- She spoke at the Fit Muslimah Summit (2008).
- Zohra Sarwari is a member of Islamic Writers Alliance. Zohra Sarwari has been interviewed on Radio Islam as well where she talked about her new published books.
- She has been interviewed by Productive Muslim as a "Productive Muslimah". Zohra's recently published books can also be seen on MuslimReview Online.
- She has been interviewed on CBS News as a Muslim Speaker. Zohra did an interview for Fox News She has done numerous Radio Shows as well.
- Zohra did an article for MuslimMatters.org MuslimMatters.org.
- She has been interviewed on FOX NEWS.
- She was awarded "The Best Woman of 2009" by Noor TV.
- She was interviewed by KIMT CBS news.
- She is also supporting a Hifz school By Charity Right.
- Sarwari runs a publishing company called Eman Publishing.

== Selected works ==
=== Books ===
- 9 Steps To Achieve Your Destiny (Revised Edition)
- Are Muslim Women Oppressed?
- Imagine that Today is YOUR Last Day
- NO! I AM NOT A TERRORIST!
- Powerful Time Management Skills for Muslims
- Speaking Skills Every Muslim Must Know
- Who Am I?
- The Amazing Kid Entrepreneur
- The Key Strategies That Can Make Anyone A Successful Leader
- A Chance To Live
- Reading Curriculum
- The Power of Reading
- Pre-K Curriculum
- K-Curriculum
- 100 Hadiths for Kids Ages 7-9
- 100 Hadiths for Kids Ages 10-12
- 25 Stories with Moral for Kids Ages 7-9 -Short Stories with Great Morals for Muslims
- The Inheritance A Journey To China
- The Inheritance A Journey To Russia
- The Inheritance A Journey To Afghanistan
- The Inheritance A Journey To Africa

=== Articles ===
- Why Do Muslim Women Wear the Headscarf (Hijab)?
- How to Pass an Interview
- How to Do More and Give More
- 4 Tips to Improve Your Concentration
- 6 Ways to Decrease Stress
- The Best Jobs For Teens
- 5 Powerful Tips to Improve Teen Self Esteem
- How to Become a Great Speaker
- How to Manage Your Time
- Should I Home School?
- How to Survive College
