= Katherine A. Flores =

Physician and advocate for Latinx medical professionals

Katherine A. Flores (born 1953) is a family physician and an Associate Clinical Professor in Family Medicine at the University of California, San Francisco School of Medicine, in the United States. She is one of the founding members of the National Hispanic Medical Association. Flores founded a range of programs focused on increasing the number of culturally competent doctors serving the Latino communities in California's Central Valley. The programs support traditionally underserved student populations to successfully pursue education and medical careers. These educational programs include the California Borders Health Education and Training Center (HETC) program, Partnerships for Health Professions Education (PHPE), and the Hispanic Centers of Excellence (HCOE), the California Health Professions Consortium, and the Latino Center for Medical Education and Research. The Latino Center for Medical Education and Research is the home of Junior Doctors Academy and Doctors Academy, programs that support middle and high school students as they pursue education and careers in medical fields. She received a James Irvine Foundation Leadership Award in 2010.

== Childhood and family life ==
Flores' family migrated from Mexico to the United States, where they worked as farm laborers. Born in Fresno, California, USA, Flores' mother died when she was just an infant. She was raised by her grandparents, and worked alongside them at agricultural jobs from about age four to 16.

Her childhood and early adult experiences inspired Flores to enter the medical field. Her grandfather lost his leg to a diabetes-related infection, as a result of the medical professionals who treated him not taking his living situation into account. She witnessed how the lack of Latino medical professionals in the San Juaquine Valley regularly led to misunderstandings that impacted the health of the region's substantial Latino population. Following those experiences, Flores became interested in representation of the Latino among medical workers. Additionally, after earning admission and full scholarship to Stanford University, Flores found college a struggle. In particular, she missed her family and community. Flores has stated that the support she received from two classmates kept her in school. She also got involved with Latino advocacy and farmworkers' rights, including marching with Cesar Chavez, and began working with Latino organizations on the state and national level. She focused on increasing the number of medical professionals who are Latino. These experiences convinced Flores that she could go to medical school and contributed to her belief that helping other students succeed would also be part of her life's work.

She married a professor of teacher education, Juan Flores. They have two children.

== Education ==
Flores completed her undergraduate degree in Human Biology from Stanford University in 1975 and her medical degree from the University of California, Davis School of Medicine in 1979. After medical school, Flores returned to Fresno for her residency, a fellowship, and eventually entering her own private practice in 1983.

== Career ==
As a partner in a bilingual family medicine practice in Fresno, CA, Flores serves a diverse population. Through her additional leadership of several large institutional medical education programs, as well as seats on advisory committees on the state and national levels, Flores aims to narrow the gap between the large percentage of the population in California's Central Valley that identifies as Latino, and the small number of Latino medical personnel.

One year after joining her private practice, in 1984, Flores took on her Associate Clinical Professor roll at UCSF School of Medicine, Department of Family and Community Medicine. In 1996, she founded the Latino Center for Medical Education and Research at UCSF, and is still the director there in 2021. From 1993 to 1999 Flores was the assistant dean of the University of California, San Francisco Fresno Medical Education Program.

Beyond her private practice and work at UCSF, Flores has long been active in other organizations that work on recruiting, training, and retaining medical personnel to work with Latino and other underserved populations. She collaborates with many partners across the Central Valley to recruit and train medical care workers with migrant farmworker backgrounds and from other underrepresented backgrounds. From 1993 to 1999, Flores was the principal investigator and project director at the California Area Health Education Center, an organization that focuses on scaffolding a health professions workforce for serving underserved communities. After attending the White House Health Care Reform Task Force meetings in 1993–1994, Flores was one of the ten Latino participants who went on to found the National Hispanic Medical Association. She was one of the Association's Leadership Fellows in 1999, and went on to serve on the board of the organization, including serving as secretary and later chairwoman. She also was with the California Health Education and Training Center from 1992 to 2007. With other medical specialists, Flores founded the California Health Professions Consortium in 2006, aiming to diversify the healthcare workforce. In 2013, California Governor Jerry Brown appointed Flores to the California Healthcare Workforce Policy Commission.

Some of the programs Flores has created focus on school success even before college. The Junior and High School Doctors Academies are run through a partnership between California State University, Fresno, and local school districts. It began at Sunnyside High School in 1999, and expanded to Caruthers and Selma high schools in 2007. The program recruits students from low-income families in the Fresno area as early as seventh grade, and supports them through high school and college. With special classes daily, as well as tutoring and internships, these programs focus on increasing students' self-confidence and study skills. In a school district with a reported twenty-five percent graduation rate in the early 2000s, Doctors Academies sustained a one hundred percent graduation rate for students who stuck with the program.
