= Mahmoud Solh =

Lebanese economist and scientist

Mahmoud Solh (born Beirut, Lebanon) is a Lebanese agricultural economist and genetic scientist who was formerly the Director General of the International Center for Agricultural Research in the Dry Areas, ICARDA based in Beirut, Lebanon.
