= Bruce A. Manning =

Bruce A. Manning is a professor of environmental chemistry at San Francisco State University (SFSU).

== Education and early career ==
Manning earned a B.S. in environmental science at the University of Massachusetts Amherst in 1985 and a Ph.D. in environmental chemistry from the University of California, Davis in 1993.

Manning was a postdoctoral scientist at the USDA U.S. Salinity Laboratory in Riverside CA and the University of California, Riverside.

== Research ==
Manning's work applies X-ray techniques such as X-ray diffraction, fluorescence, and absorption spectroscopy to environmental chemistry problems and materials chemical research. His research interests include soil chemistry, surface analysis, mineralogy, remediation, inorganic chemical analysis, and computational chemistry.

His research has been funded by NSF, USDA, and DuPont. Manning was a Research Corporation Cottrell College Science Award Fellow from 2001-2005.
