= Nancy Butler Songer =

American academic

Nancy Butler Songer is the Associate Provost of STEM Education at the University of Utah . Songer was a 2019-2020 Fulbright Scholar with the Ministry of Science, Technology, Innovation, and Communication in Brazil. Songer was previously Dean of the School of Education at Drexel University and the University of Utah. Songer was a Professor of Science Education and Learning Technologies at The University of Michigan for 18 years (1996-2014). Songer received a Presidential Faculty Fellow Award from President William J. Clinton in 1995. Her work focuses on the design of educational innovations for promoting critical thinking in science, environmental awareness, and increased interactivity and participation in science careers.

== Education ==
Songer earned a BS in Biological Sciences from the University of California, Davis, an MS in Developmental Biology From Tufts University and a Ph.D. in Science Education and Learning Technologies from the University of California, Berkeley, working with Marcia Linn.

== Research interests ==
Her work is focused in these areas: (1) Urban Science, Technology, Engineering, and Mathematics (STEM) education. Over many years, Songer and her research teams conducted research studies focused on fostering engaged critical thinking in STEM disciplines with a primary focus on students and teachers in urban schools, including the Detroit Public Schools and the School District of Philadelphia. (2) Strategic simplification. Recognized by software designers and others, strategic simplification codifies the necessary thought process to simplify complex ideas into high-integrity, usable knowledge for non-scientific and younger audiences. Using these techniques, Songer and her team have developed eight learning technology tools and eight curricular units for 4-10th grade students that promote accessible complex thinking about focal ideas. (3) International STEM Education reform, including current work in Egypt associated with the STEM Teacher Education and School Strengthening Activity (STESSA)project in partnership with 21st Partnership for STEM Education (21PSTEM) and funded by the United States Agency for International Development (USAID), a 2019 Fulbright Scholars Award in Brazil, and a 2013 Fulbright Specialists Award focused on STEM Education in Turkmenistan.
