= Mike Kim (executive) =

Korean-American business executive (born 1983)

- 김준
- Born: 1983; California, United States
- Education: University of California, Davis (BA)
- Occupation: Business executive
- Years active: 2007–present
- Title: Head of Google for Startups (Asia-Pacific)

Michael Kim (Korean: 김준; born 1983) is a South Korean and American business executive. He is the co-founder of Korea Legacy Committee (KLC), a nonprofit organisation to fight homelessness and aging. He is the Head of Google for Startups APAC.

== Early life and education ==
Kim grew up in Piedmont, California. He attended the University of California, Davis and graduated in 2006.

== Career ==
In the mid 2000s, he worked at LinkedIn, Monster.com, Zynga. In 2014, he relocated to Seoul to join Baedal Minjok, South Korea’s top food-delivery company.

In 2015, Kim co-founded the Korea Legacy Committee together with Jeena Ko. The organisation hosts events and fundraisers to assist poverty facing South Korea's elderly population.

In 2016, he joined Google as an APAC Partnerships Manager at Google for Startups.
