= Hans Ostrom =

American literary scholar

Hans Ansgar Ostrom
- Born: January 29, 1954 (age 72); Sierra City, California, U.S.
- Education: University of California, Davis
- Occupations: Author, editor, educator

Hans Ansgar Ostrom (born January 29, 1954) is an American scholar, currently a professor of African American Studies and English at the University of Puget Sound (1983–present). He is known for his authorship of various books on African-American studies and creative writing, and novels including Three to Get Ready, Honoring Juanita, and Without One, as well as The Coast Starlight: Collected Poems 1976–2006.

== Works ==
- The Coast Starlight: Collected Poems 1976-2006 (Indianapolis: Dog Ear Publishing, 2006) ISBN 978-1-59858-102-7
- Honoring Juanita: A Novel (Congruent Angle Press, 2010).
- Co-editor, with J. David Macey, The Greenwood Encyclopedia of African American Literature (Westport: Greenwood Press, 2005): 5 volumes.
- A Langston Hughes Encyclopedia (Westport: Greenwood Press, 2002);
- Langston Hughes: A Study of the Short Fiction (New York: Twayne, 1993);
- With Wendy Bishop and Katharine Haake, Metro: Journeys in Writing Creatively (New York: Longman, 2001)
- Subjects Apprehended (Johnstown, Ohio: Pudding House Press, 2000);
- Three to Get Ready (Oakland: Cliffhanger, 1991).
- Co-editor, with Wendy Bishop, The Subject Is Story: Essays for Writers and Readers (Boyton-Cook/Heineman, 2003).
- "To War Again" (poem), Perspectives: A Journal of Reformed Thought
- "The Green Bird" (short story), Ploughshares (Winter 1986)
- "Guest Post: Hans Ostrom on the Next Decade in Book Culture", Critical Mass, January 8, 2010
- Without One: A Novel (Congruent Angle Press, 2012).
- With William Haltom, Orwell's "Politics and the English Language" in the Age of Pseudocracy, New York: Routledge/Taylor & Francis, 2018. ISBN 9781351013871
- With Wendy Bishop, Colors of a Different Horse: Rethinking Creative Writing Theory and Pedagogy. Urbana: National Council of Teachers of English, 1994. ISBN 978-0814107164
- With J. David Macey, Forgotten African American Firsts: An Encyclopedia of Pioneering History. Westport: Greenwood Publishers, 2023.ISBN 978-1-4408-7535-9

== Sources ==
- "Hans Ostrom", Contemporary Authors, New Series, Vol. 43 (Detroit: Gale Research, 1998)
- Choice, December 1993, review of Langston Hughes: A Study of the Short Fiction, p. 605
- S. A. Vega Garcia, Choice, October 2002, review of A Langston Hughes Encyclopedia, p. 257
- Review of The Greenwood Encyclopedia of African American Literature, Library Journal, 2005
- Review of The Greenwood Encyclopedia of African American Literature, School Library Journal, March 2005
- "Hans Ostrom", in Directory of American Poets and Fiction Writers (New York: Poets and Writers, 1998–present)
- Wendy Bishop, Thirteen Ways of Looking for a Poem (New York: Longman, 1999); includes several poems by Ostrom
- Will Hochman, "The Ongoing Legacy of Wendy Bishop Is In Our Stories: Review of The Subject is Story: Essays for Writers and Readers, Edited by Wendy Bishop and Hans Ostrom", Across the Disciplines: Interdisciplinary Perspectives on Language, Literature, and Writing (2004)
- Donald, David Herbert (September 1, 1996). "Good Race Men: Review of Short Stories of Langston Hughes". The New York Times.
- Greenwood Press: Greenwood Encyclopedia of African American Literature (2005), edited by Hans Ostrom and J David Macey: excerpts from multiple reviews: http://www.greenwood.com/catalog/GR2972.aspx
- ERIC abstract of Colors of a Different Horse: Rethinking Creative Writing Theory and Pedagogy, edited by Wendy Bishop and Hans Ostrom.
- Rita Dove, "Poet's Choice", Washington Post (column by Rita Dove), May 20, 2001, includes "Emily Dickinson and Elvis Presley in Heaven", a poem by Hans Ostrom.
