= Martin Tolich =

New Zealand sociologist and ethicist (born 1957)

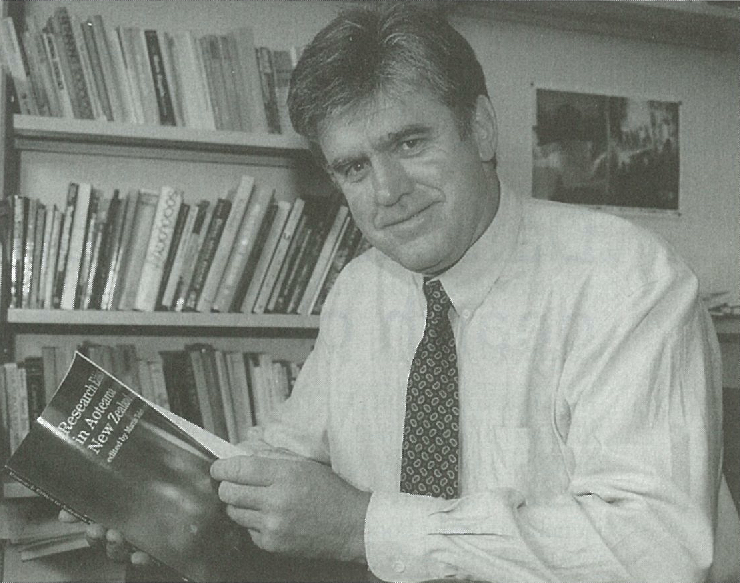
- Tolich in 2001
- Born: 8 June 1957; Auckland, New Zealand
- Education: University of Auckland; University of California, Davis
- Scientific career
- Fields: Sociology
- Website: Profile on University of Otago (archived)

Martin Tolich (born 8 June 1957) is a New Zealand sociologist and ethicist.

== Career ==
Tolich specialises in qualitative research methods and research ethics committees. He earned a master's degree in sociology from the University of Auckland and completed his PhD at the University of California, Davis in 1991. He was a lecturer in sociology at Massey University from 1992 to 2004. In 2005 he transferred to the University of Otago to establish that university's first sociology major programme. Tolich was appointed Associate Professor at the University of Otago in 2009. He retired from teaching in 2022.

== Research ethics ==
Tolich served as the deputy chair of the Massey University human ethics committee from 1997. In 2002 he joined the Manawatū-Whanganui Health and Disability ethics committee. In 2004 the Minister of Health appointed Martin Tolich chair of the newly established Multi-region health and disability ethics committee, where he served until 2009. In 2011 Tolich and his colleague Dr Barry Poata Smith were awarded a three-year Marsden grant to study the "Tensions around ethics review and Māori consultation".

Tolich is the founder of the Aotearoa Research Ethics Committee (previously the New Zealand Ethics Committee), a not-for-profit independent ethics committee, serving any researcher not eligible for health or institutional ethics review.

== Personal life ==
Born in Auckland, Tolich now lives in Dunedin. He married Derrith Bartley in 1983. The couple have two children.

== Publications ==
- Tolich, M. (Ed.). (2016). Qualitative ethics in practice. Walnut Creek, CA: Left Coast Press.
- Sieber, J.E., & Tolich, M.B. (2013). Planning ethically responsible research (2nd ed.). Thousand Oaks, CA: SAGE.
- Tolich, M., & Davidson, C. (2011). Getting started: An introduction to research methods. Auckland, New Zealand: Pearson.
- Davidson, C., & Tolich, M. (Eds.). (2003). Social science research in New Zealand (2nd ed.). Auckland, New Zealand: Pearson Education New Zealand.
