= Tim Lee (comedian) =

American stand-up comedian and biologist

- Born: Tim Xtreme Lee
- Education: UC San Diego; UC Davis
- Occupation(s): Comedian, biologist
- Website: Official website

Tim Xtreme Lee is an American stand-up comedian and biologist living in southern California.

== Early life and education ==
Tim Lee's father gave him the middle name Xtreme, hoping his son would grow up to be a stunt man. Lee rejected that path and focused on the sciences for most of his life; studying ecology and evolution at UC San Diego, where he graduated magna cum laude in biology in 1993. He went on to complete his PhD at UC Davis, developing simulation and analytical models of population dynamics, before becoming a comedian.

== Career in comedy ==
Lee has become popular on YouTube with over 4.5 million views on his videos. His standard method of presentation is performing a "parody of a science seminar" complete with visual aids.
