= Sarah Myhre =

American climatologist

- Born: Washington, US
- Education: University of California, Davis; University of Western Washington
- Known for: Climate science and activism
- Scientific career
- Fields: Climate science, marine ecology

Sarah Myhre is a climate scientist who uses geology to analyze ancient marine ecosystems and how they reacted to sudden climate changes in Earth's history. She is also an outspoken advocate for both social justice and science, emphasizing that climate change must be tackled alongside misogyny and social injustice. Myhre strives to help those most affected by climate change, but who lack the platform to speak. Myhre is also a founding board member of 500 Women Scientists, an organization that aims to make science more inclusive.

== Early life and education ==
Myhre is a fifth-generation Washingtonian who grew up in Seattle. She immersed herself in the outdoors throughout her childhood, whether it was skiing on the North Cascades mountains or exploring tide pools with her marine scientist aunt. Myhre comes from a family with many engineers.

Myhre attended Western Washington University, receiving a BS in biology. During her undergraduate years, she studied marine ecology. She performed field work in Costa Rica, monitoring the recovery of a sea urchin species that helps coral reefs thrive. Her later undergraduate studies took her to Bermuda and Hawaii where she worked for NOAA's Coral Reef Ecosystem Program. Myhre says that her studies in Costa Rica brought to light the unique obstacles that women face when trying to succeed in science. She said she experienced "sexual assault, physical abuse, and institutional negligence".

In 2013, Myhre was a Robert and Patricia Switzer Foundation Fellow studying climate change and coastal and marine conservation. In 2014, Myhre completed a PhD in ecology from University of California, Davis. Her new research area combined her previous interests; she studied geology to analyze ancient marine ecosystems and how they reacted to sudden climate changes in Earth's history.

== Career ==
From 2015 to 2019, Myhre was a research associate at the University of Washington's School of Oceanography where she continued her analysis of how marine life adjusted to past abrupt climate changes.

Myhre was also a Kavli Fellow with the National Academy of Science and a senior fellow in Project Drawdown at the Breakthrough Institute, a research center that focuses on environmental solutions.

Myhre is now widely published in marine ecology and climate change. A large body of her work concerns the ecosystems off the coast of California, where she takes a palaeoecological approach to understanding Earth's history of climate change. For example, she uses samples of Earth's sediment, as well as marine fossils to piece together when certain changes occurred in the climate and affected marine organisms.

Since 2022, Myhre has worked as the program director for climate advocacy and democracy reform at the Glaser Progress Foundation. She believes that "a healthy and safe community is a non-partisan goal", regardless of whether the threat is climate change or respiratory viruses.

In 2018, Myhre founded a startup, the Rowan Institute, which aimed to make an impact on the world through scientific leadership. Additionally, she is a founding board member of 500 Women Scientists where she advocates for social justice and science.

== Honors and awards ==
Myhre was named one of the most influential Seattleites of 2017 by Seattle Magazine. She was also listed in 2018 as one of "30 More Women Who Run [Seattle]" by Seattle Met.
