= Ken Mercurio =

American business executive and author

- Born: c. 1958 (age 67–68); Petaluma, California, United States
- Education: University of California, Davis, UCLA
- Occupations: Business executive, author
- Known for: Expert in nutrition labeling

Ken Mercurio is an American business executive and author. He is best known as an expert in nutrition labeling and for having survived and recovered from a serious cycling accident.

== Early life and education ==
Mercurio was born in Petaluma, California around 1958. He graduated from University of California, Davis, home to the U.S. Bicycling Hall of Fame, with a degree in nutrition science. His master's degree is also in nutrition, from the University of California, Los Angeles.

== Career ==
Mercurio worked 31 years for Carnation and Nestlé USA. He held many positions culminating in director of nutrition and food-product labeling, which included involvement with the U.S. delegation to the United Nations Codex Committee on Food Labeling and service on the Institute of Food Technologists Expert Committee on Functional Foods.

While working for Nestle, Mercurio was a member of the American College of Nutrition, the California Nutrition Council (serving as president in 1984), the Institute of Food Technologists, and the Society for Nutrition Education. He was a founding board member of the International Food Information Council and was a board member of the International Life Sciences Institute.

== Personal life ==
He is the father of two children and resides in Monroe, Ohio. He had lived most of his life in the Los Angeles area.

Mercurio continues to endurance-ride his bike despite his permanently stiff neck and near-death bike accident.

== Bibliography ==
Head Over Wheels – a ‘lucky stiff’ turns tragedy into a cycling triumph is his first book and focuses on his comeback from a near-death broken neck.

He also authors an ongoing blog about bicycling safety. Mercurio has been published in three scholarly journals:

- "Effects of Fiber Type and Level on Mineral Excretion, Transit Time, and Intestinal Histology" (Kenneth C. Mercurio, Patricia A. Behn) Journal of Food Science. Vol. 46, No. 5, pp. 1462–1477, 1981
- "Effects of Processing on the Bioavailability and Chemistry of Iron Powders in a Liquid Milk-Based Product" (R.A. Clemens, K.C. Mercurio) Journal of Food Science. Vol. 46, No. 3, pp. 930–932, 1981
- "Nutritive and Sensory Evaluation of 20 Year Old Nonfat Dry Milk" (Kenneth C. Mercurio, Virginia A. Tadjalli) Journal of Dairy Science Vol. 62, No. 4, pp. 633–636, 1979
