= Elvira de Mejia =

American food scientist

- Education: Instituto Politécnico Nacional (BS, PhD); University of California, Davis (MS)
- Scientific career
- Fields: Food science
- Workplaces: University of Illinois at Urbana–Champaign

Elvira de Mejia (born in 1950) is a biochemist and food scientist, currently working as a professor of food sciences and human nutrition at the University of Illinois at Urbana–Champaign. She is an expert in the areas of food science, food toxicology, and chemoprevention.

== Education ==
De Mejia earned a Bachelor of Science degree in biochemical engineering from the National Polytechnic Institute in Mexico. She went on to receive a master's degree in food science and technology from the University of California, Davis and a Ph.D. in plant biotechnology from the National Polytechnic Institute.

== Research ==
De Mejia's work has focused on bioactive food components, especially proteins and flavonoids. Her research touches on the health benefits of compounds in certain foods such as legumes, oilseeds, and vegetables.

Her lab has also studied the molecular mechanisms responsible for certain biological effects of teas used in folk medicines. For instance, De Mejia's 2007 study found that consuming 0.5 liters of yerba mate tea increases activity levels of the enzyme that produces HDL cholesterol, and lowers levels of LDL cholesterol. Study participants who drank mate tea had a 10% increase in the level of cardioprotective enzyme PON1, a precursor to HDL, compared to others drinking milk or coffee. De Meija and others found in a 2009 study that catechins and theaflavins found in tea may reduce the risk of various types of cancers.

De Mejia, working with a team including Benito O. de Lumen, Vermont P. Dia, and others, has also shown that lunasin, a peptide found in soy and some cereal grains, has the ability to inhibit the aberrant inflammation that can occur in chronic diseases, including cancer. This discovery was a part of research attempts to create purified lunasin through a more inexpensive means.

In 2025, De Meija and her team at the University of Illinois Urbana-Champaign studied how fermenting beans and lentils with probiotic bacteria could make them more nutritious. They found the best fermentation conditions for legumes to increase antioxidant and antidiabetic properties, as well as their protein levels.
