= Peter J. Salzman =

American computer hacker

Peter J. Salzman was a computer hacker and former senior member of the hacking group, Legion of Doom, in the 1980s. He was the first hacker apprehended during Operation Sundevil and was caught while serving in the United States Air Force as a computer cryptography specialist.

Salzman was the founder and many time president of the Linux Users Group of Davis. He finished a Ph.D. at University of California, Davis in physics, doing a dissertation on the semi-classical theory of gravitation, a subtopic of quantum gravity. He is also the author and former maintainer of the popular guides Using GNU's GDB Debugger and Linux Kernel Module Programming Guide.

He co-authored (along with Norman Matloff) a popular book on computer program debugging called "The Art of Debugging with GDB", which was published on April 15, 2008.

Salzman finished a Master of Quantitative Finance at Baruch College. He worked as a quantitative developer for Fitch Ratings and Fitch Solutions before becoming a quantitative analyst for Algorithmics. He is currently a quantitative analyst for IBM.
