= List of University of California, Davis faculty =

This page lists notable faculty (past and present) of the University of California, Davis.

== Arts and music ==
- Robert Arneson, professor emeritus of art, known for ceramics, artist of the Eggheads sculptures scattered through the UC Davis campus
- Larry Austin, professor of music, composer, and later taught at University of South Florida and University of North Texas
- Ross Bauer, professor emeritus of music
- Anna Maria Busse Berger, chair of music department
- Ruby Cohn, professor of comparative drama (late)
- Roy De Forest, professor emeritus of art, painter, and sculptor
- Jesse Drew, professor in cinema and technocultural studies
- Lynn Hershman Leeson, filmmaker, professor of technocultural studies
- Ruth Horsting, professor emerita of art (taught from 1959–1971), known for sculpture
- Theodore Cyrus Karp, professor of music (moved to Northwestern before retirement)
- Manuel Neri, professor emeritus of art, taught 1965–1990
- Bob Ostertag, professor of technocultural studies
- Richard Swift, professor emeritus, founder of Department of Music
- Wayne Thiebaud, professor emeritus of art, awarded the National Medal of Arts
- Richard Aaker Trythall, professor of music, Guggenheim Fellow (1967)
- William T. Wiley, former art professor

== Biological sciences ==
- Daniel I. Axelrod, professor of botany (late)
- Richard M. Bohart, professor of entomology (late)
- George Delahunty, professor of biology
- Theodosius Dobzhansky, professor emeritus of evolutionary biology, 1971–1975
- Jonathan Eisen, professor of evolution and ecology
- Stanley Barron Freeborn, UC Davis chancellor and entomologist, namesake of Freeborn Hall and the mosquito species Anopheles freeborni
- Ermias Kebreab, professor of animal sciences
- Lynn Kimsey, professor of entomology
- Paul Knoepfler, professor of cell biology and human anatomy
- Robert Laben, professor of animal sciences (late)
- Johanna Schmitt, botanist and professor of evolution and ecology
- Arthur Shapiro, professor of entomology, evolution and ecology
- Tracy I. Storer, professor emeritus, founder of Department of Zoology
- Charles W. Woodworth, professor emeritus of entomology (1891–1930), founder of UCB Entomology Division, credited with founding the Dept. of Entomology at the Agricultural Experiment Station
- Pamela Ronald, distinguished professor of plant pathology
- Jonathan M. Scholey, Distinguished Professor Emeritus of Molecular and Cellular Biology

== Chemistry ==
- R. David Britt, professor of chemistry
- Edwin G. Krebs, founding chairman and professor of the department of biological chemistry 1968–1977, winner of the Nobel Prize in Medicine
- Julie A. Leary, professor of chemistry
- Philip Power, professor of chemistry, Royal Society

== Communications and media ==
- Charles Berger, professor of communication

== Earth sciences ==
- Gerard Bond, professor of geology
- Alan Hastings, professor of ecology
- Louise H. Kellogg, professor of earth and planetary sciences
- Isabel P. Montañez, professor of earth and planetary sciences
- Eldridge M. Moores, professor emeritus of geology, now the earth and planetary sciences
- Donald L. Turcotte, professor emeritus of earth and planetary sciences
- Geerat J. Vermeij, professor of geology, MacArthur Fellowship

== Economics ==
- Colin Carter, professor of agricultural economics
- Gregory Clark, professor of economics
- Alan M. Taylor, professor of economics and finance

== Engineering ==
- Kandiah Arulanandan, professor of civil engineering (late)
- Kyriacos A. Athanasiou, professor of bioengineering
- Jeannie Darby, professor of civil and environmental engineering
- Richard C. Dorf, professor emeritus of electrical and computer engineering
- Andrew A. Frank, professor of mechanical and aeronautical engineering
- M. Saif Islam, professor of electrical and computer engineering
- Linda P.B. Katehi, professor of electrical and computer engineering; UC Davis chancellor (2009–2016)
- Brian Launder, professor of mechanical and aerospace engineering (now at the University of Manchester)
- Neville C. Luhmann Jr., professor of electrical and computer engineering
- Paul Moller, professor emeritus of mechanical and aeronautical engineering
- John D. Owens, professor of electrical and computer engineering
- Ning Pan, professor of biological and agricultural engineering
- Jinyi Qi professor at the Department of Biomedical Engineering
- George Tchobanoglous, professor emeritus of civil and environmental engineering

== English ==
- Joshua Clover, associate professor of English
- Lucy Corin, professor of English
- Lynn Freed, professor of English
- Sandra Gilbert, professor emerita of English, former president of the Modern Language Association
- Sandra McPherson, professor emerita of English
- Karl Shapiro, professor, English Department, Pulitzer Prize for poetry, 1945
- Gary Snyder, professor emeritus of English; Bolligen Prize, Pulitzer Prize
- Joe Wenderoth, associate professor of English

== Food sciences ==
- William Vere Cruess, professor of food science (late)
- M. R. C. Greenwood, professor emerita of nutrition, president of the University of Hawaii
- Gordie C. Hanna, professor of agronomy (late)
- Lucille Shapson Hurley, (1922–1988), former professor of nutrition
- Emil M. Mrak, professor of food science; UC Davis chancellor (1959–1969)
- Ann C. Noble, professor of food science, inventor of the "Aroma Wheel"
- Harold Olmo, professor of viticulture

== History ==
- David Brody, professor emeritus of history
- William W. Hagen, professor of history
- Ari Kelman, professor of American and environmental history
- Barbara D. Metcalf, professor emerita of history
- Andrés Reséndez, historian
- Simon Sadler, professor of art history
- Eric Rauchway, professor of American history

== Law and government ==
- Diane Marie Amann, professor of law (now at Georgia Tech)
- Vikram Amar, associate dean for academic affairs (School of Law), constitutional law scholar
- Edgar Bodenheimer, professor of law (late)
- Alan Brownstein, professor of law; Boochever and Bird Chair for the Study and Teaching of Freedom and Equality
- Abre' Conner, director of the Center for Environmental and Climate Justice at the NAACP
- Joel Dobris, professor of law
- Robert W. Hillman, professor of law
- Edward Imwinkelried, professor of law (co-author, Scientific Evidence)
- Kevin Johnson, dean, School of Law
- Miguel Méndez, professor of law
- Rex R. Perschbacher, professor of law
- Cruz Reynoso, professor of law; associate justice, California Supreme Court (1982–1987); Presidential Medal of Freedom (2000)
- Martha West, professor emerita of law

== Mathematics ==
- Dmitry Fuchs, professor of mathematics
- Greg Kuperberg, professor of mathematics
- Washek Pfeffer, emeritus professor of mathematics
- Albert Schwarz, professor of mathematics
- Joseph Teran, professor of applied mathematics
- William Thurston, professor of mathematics, later moved to Cornell University, Fields Medalist award
- Craig Tracy, professor of mathematics, American Academy of Arts & Sciences, Pólya Prize, Norbert Wiener Prize
- Jessica Utts, professor of statistics, later moved to University of California, Irvine
- Roger J-B Wets, professor emeritus of mathematics

== Medicine ==
- David Amaral, professor of psychiatry
- Richard Coss, emeritus professor of psychology
- Gregory M. Herek, professor of psychology
- Leah Krubitzer, professor of psychology
- Peter Robert Marler, professor emeritus of neurobiology
- Jonna Mazet, professor of epidemiology, director of the UC Davis One Health Institute
- A. Hari Reddi, distinguished professor of orthopedic surgery
- Christian Sandrock, professor of pulmonary, critical care, and sleep medicine
- Marc B. Schenker, professor, Department of Public Health Sciences
- Ivan R. Schwab, professor of ophthalmology
- Robert Sommer, professor emeritus of psychology
- G. Ledyard Stebbins, professor emeritus of genetics, National Medal of Science
- Ross Thompson, distinguished professor of psychology
- Larry N. Vanderhoef, professor, College of Biological Sciences; UC Davis chancellor (2004–2009)
- Yu-Jui Yvonne Wan, Distinguished Professor and Vice Chair of Research for the Department of Pathology and Laboratory Medicine
- Rachel Whitmer, professor of epidemiology

== Physics ==
- Steve Carlip, professor of physics
- Zachary Fisk, professor of physics
- Veronika Hubeny, professor of physics

== Social sciences, sociology, anthropology, and cultural studies ==
- Nicole W. Biggart, professor of management and sociology
- Fred L. Block, professor of sociology
- Angie Chabram-Dernersesian, professor of Chicana/o studies and cultural studies
- Darrell Hamamoto, professor of Asian American studies
- Sarah Blaffer Hrdy, professor emerita of anthropology
- Lynne Isbell, primatologist, professor of anthropology
- Suad Joseph, professor of anthropology and women and gender studies
- William B. Lacy, professor emeritus of Human Ecology; vice provost emeritus for University Outreach and International Programs
- Smadar Lavie, professor of anthropology
- John Lofland, professor emeritus of sociology
- Henry McHenry, professor of anthropology; UC Davis Prize; elected fellow, California Academy of Sciences
- Zoila S. Mendoza, professor and chair of Native American studies
- Jacob K. Olupona, professor of African and African American studies, later at Harvard University
- Rhacel Parrenas, professor of sociology, later at Brown University
- Robyn Rodriguez, professor in Asian American studies
- Hulleah Tsinhnahjinnie, assistant professor of Native American studies and director of the C.N. Gorman Museum
- Aram Yengoyan, professor of anthropology

== Other ==
- Francisco X. Alarcón, lecturer in Spanish
- Berni Alder, professor emeritus of applied science, National Medal of Science recipient
- Marc Blanchard, professor of critical theory and comparative literature
- Andy Bloom, Olympic shot putter
- Carol Cartwright, former vice chancellor for academic affairs
- Steven C. Currall, dean of graduate school of management
- Gerald Dworkin, professor of philosophy
- John Freeman, visiting professor of international relations, 1985–1990
- James R. Griesemer, professor of philosophy
- Andrew Hargadon, professor of technology management
- Irva Hertz-Picciotto, professor of environmental and occupational health
- Ralph Hexter, professor of classics and provost
- Theodore L. Hullar, former chancellor
- Lincoln Hurst, professor of religious studies (late)
- Amy Block Joy, Cooperative Extension Specialist, Emeritus
- Amina Mama, professor and director of women and gender studies
- Zeev Maoz, distinguished professor of political science, international relations expert
- Norman Matloff, professor of computer science
- Prasant Mohapatra, distinguished Professor in Computer Science and vice chancellor for research
- Phillip Rogaway, professor of computer science (RSA Award 2003)
- Robert Torrance, professor of comparative literature
- Keith David Watenpaugh, professor of human rights studies

== See also ==
- List of University of California, Davis alumni
