= Perschbacher =

Perschbacher is a surname. Notable people with the surname include:

- Rex R. Perschbacher (c. 1946–2018), American legal scholar
- Wesley John Perschbacher (1932–2012), American writer and academic
