= Bill Dodge =

American lawyer

- Born: William S. Dodge; Nigeria

Academic background
- Education: Yale University (BA, JD)

Academic work
- Discipline: Law
- Sub-discipline: International law Business law
- Institutions: University of California, Hastings College of the Law; UC Davis School of Law; The George Washington University Law School

William S. Dodge is an American legal scholar working as the Lobingier professor of comparative law and jurisprudence at the George Washington University Law School. He is professor of law emeritus at the UC Davis School of Law.

== Early life and education ==
Dodge was born in Nigeria, where his parents were stationed while serving in the Peace Corps. Shortly after he was born, his family returned to the Marin Headlands in Northern California, where Dodge spent the remainder of his childhood. Dodge earned a Bachelor of Arts degree in history from Yale University in 1986 and a Juris Doctor from the Yale Law School in 1991.

== Career ==
After graduation from law school, he served as law clerk for William A. Norris of the Ninth Circuit Court of Appeals, and then Harry Blackmun of the Supreme Court. In 2011 and 2012, Dodge served as an international law counselor to the legal adviser of the Department of State, Harold Hongju Koh.

Dodge served as acting associate academic dean and professor at University of California, Hastings College of the Law. In August 2024 he joined the faculty at the George Washington University Law School as the Lobingier professor of comparative law and jurisprudence. Dodge's scholarship focuses on international law and business law. He has published at least 21 articles in major law reviews. His article "The Historical Origins of the Alien Tort Statute: A Response to the Originalists" in the Hastings Law Journal has been cited 168 times. In Sosa v. Alvarez-Machain, Justice David Souter writing for the Court cited his article "The Constitutionality of the Alien Tort Statute: Some Observations on Text and Context," published in the Virginia Journal of International Law. Justice Sonia Sotomayor cited his article “Corporate Liability Under Customary International Law,” published in the Georgetown Journal of International Law in her dissent in Jesner v. Arab Bank, PLC.

== See also ==
- List of law clerks for the second seat of the Supreme Court of the United States
- Wiliam S. Dodge Papers at SSRN
