= Ernst Levy (jurist) =

- Born: 23 December 1881; Berlin, Prussia
- Died: 14 September 1968 (aged 86); Davis, California, US
- Education: Humboldt University of Berlin
- Spouse: Zerline Wolff (m. 1909)
- Children: 2, including Brigitte
- Scientific career
- Fields: History of law
- Doctoral advisor: Emil Seckel

Ernst Levy (23 December 1881 – 14 September 1968) was a German American legal scholar and historian of law. He earned a doctorate in law at the University of Berlin in 1906 and began his teaching career at the Humboldt University of Berlin in 1914. After serving in the army, Levy was named Professor of Roman Law at the Goethe University Frankfurt, where he taught from 1919-1922, followed Otto Lenel as Professor of Roman Law at the University of Freiburg from 1922-1928, and then taught at the University of Heidelberg from 1928-1935. Being Jewish, he was forced to retire in 1935, and decided to emigrate from Nazi Germany to the University of Washington in the United States, where he was a Professor of Law and History from 1937 to 1952.

Born in Berlin, Levy studied law at both the University of Freiburg and the Humboldt University of Berlin, earning his doctorate under Emil Seckel in 1906. He briefly worked at the Amtsgericht in Oranienburg, and served in World War I in the artillery before earning a professorship at Frankfurt. Due to the Nuremberg Laws he had to retire in 1935, and then moved to the United States. During his career Levy was managing editor of the Zeitschrift der Savigny-Stiftung für Rechtsgeschichte for nine years and was granted a Guggenheim Fellowship. Levy also served as "magister" of the Riccobono Seminar at the Catholic University of America in 1944. He was a prolific scholar and was the recipient of honorary degrees from both the University of Frankfurt and the University of Heidelberg in 1949.
