= Miguel Méndez (disambiguation) =

Miguel Méndez (1930–2013) was a Mexican American author.

Miguel Méndez is also the name of:

- Miguel Méndez (legal scholar) (c. 1943–2017), professor of law
- Miguel Abadía Méndez (1867–1947), president of Colombia
- Miguel Méndez (baseball)
- Miguel Méndez (basketball)
