= Steven C. Currall =

American psychological scientist and academic administrator

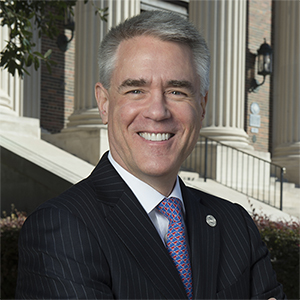

7th President of the University of South Florida
- In office July 1, 2019 – August 2, 2021
- Preceded by: Judy Genshaft
- Succeeded by: Rhea Law

Provost and Vice President for Academic Affairs at Southern Methodist University
- In office January 1, 2016 – June 30, 2019
- Preceded by: Paul W. Ludden
- Succeeded by: Elizabeth G. Loboa

Personal details
- Born: Kansas City, Missouri
- Education: Baylor University (BA); London School of Economics (MSc); Cornell University (PhD)

Steve C. Currall is an American psychological scientist and academic administrator, and served as the seventh president of the University of South Florida. He previously served as provost and vice president for academic affairs at Southern Methodist University from January 1, 2016. From 2009 to 2014, Currall served as Dean of the UC Davis Graduate School of Management. He has also held leadership roles at University College London and Rice University. On March 22, 2019, Currall was named to succeed Judy Genshaft as president of the University of South Florida, and took office July 1, 2019. He announced his resignation due to health and family reasons on July 19, 2021.

== Background ==
Currall was born in Kansas City, Missouri, and is an alumnus of Center High School. Currall graduated from Baylor University with a Bachelor of Arts in psychology in 1982. He then graduated from London School of Economics with a Master of Science in social psychology in 1985 and from Cornell University with a Ph.D. in organizational behavior in 1990.

=== Career ===
In January 2016, Steven C. Currall became the provost and vice president of academic affairs at Southern Methodist University (SMU). As provost, he oversaw all aspects of academic activity at SMU including seven academic units: Cox School of Business, Dedman College of Humanities and Sciences, Dedman School of Law, Meadows School of the Arts, Lyle School of Engineering, Perkins School of Theology, and Simmons School of Education and Human Development, as well as Central University Libraries, the Office of Research and Graduate Studies, satellite campuses, and other academic programs. At SMU, Currall was the David B. Miller Endowed Professor and held academic appointments in the Cox School of Business, Dedman College of Humanities and Sciences and the Lyle School of Engineering.

Previously, Currall was the vice-chairman of the board of directors and member of the executive committee for the 10-campus University of California Global Health Institute. He also served on the board of directors of the San Francisco Bay Area Council and the California Life Sciences Association.

At the University of California, Davis, Currall served as senior advisor to the chancellor for strategic projects and initiatives, during which he co-chaired a campus-wide strategic visioning exercise to position UC Davis as the "University of the 21st Century." He also led planning for an additional campus in the Sacramento metropolitan area. Currall served as the dean of the UC Davis Graduate School of Management, leading the school to the highest MBA program ranking in its history.

At University College London, he was the founding chair of the Department of Management Science and Innovation in the Faculty of Engineering Sciences, where he was also a vice dean.

For 12 years, he served as a professor at Rice University and held the William and Stephanie Sick Professorship of Entrepreneurship in the George R. Brown School of Engineering. He founded the Rice Alliance for Technology And Entrepreneurship.

At the invitation of the President's Council of Advisors on Science and Technology, Currall was a member of the Nanotechnology Technical Advisory Group. He has been a grantee on $21,533,893 in external funding of which over 78% came from referred research grants from the National Science Foundation (NSF) and National Institutes of Health. Currall was lead author of a book on university-business-government collaboration entitled, Organized Innovation: A Blueprint for Renewing America's Prosperity (Oxford, 2014). Based on a study funded by the NSF, the book is the culmination of a 10-year research project on interdisciplinary research involving science, engineering, and medicine. He has served as a member of several editorial review boards such as Academy of Management Review, Academy of Management Journal, and Organization Science.

Currall is on the board of the University Advisory Committee, Cancer Prevention and Research Institute of Texas (CPRIT) of Texas. In 2007, Texas voters approved a State of Texas constitutional amendment establishing CPRIT and authorizing the state to issue $3,000,000,000 in bonds to fund groundbreaking cancer research and prevention programs.

=== Awards ===
- Fellow, American Association for the Advancement of Science.
- Grand Velocity Award for Academic Entrepreneurship, Kelley School of Business, Indiana University, Bloomington, 2006.
- Entrepreneur of the Year Award®, Ernst & Young's regional Supporter of Entrepreneurship category, 2005.
- Price Foundation Innovative Entrepreneurship Educator Award, Stanford University Technology Ventures Program (School of Engineering), 2004.
- Halliburton Foundation Award of Excellence for professionalism in education, research and service to students, Jones Graduate School, Rice University, 1995.
- Rotary International Fellowship, London School of Economics and Political Science, 1984–85.
- Significant Sig, Sigma Chi Fraternity , 2020
