= Laura Liswood =

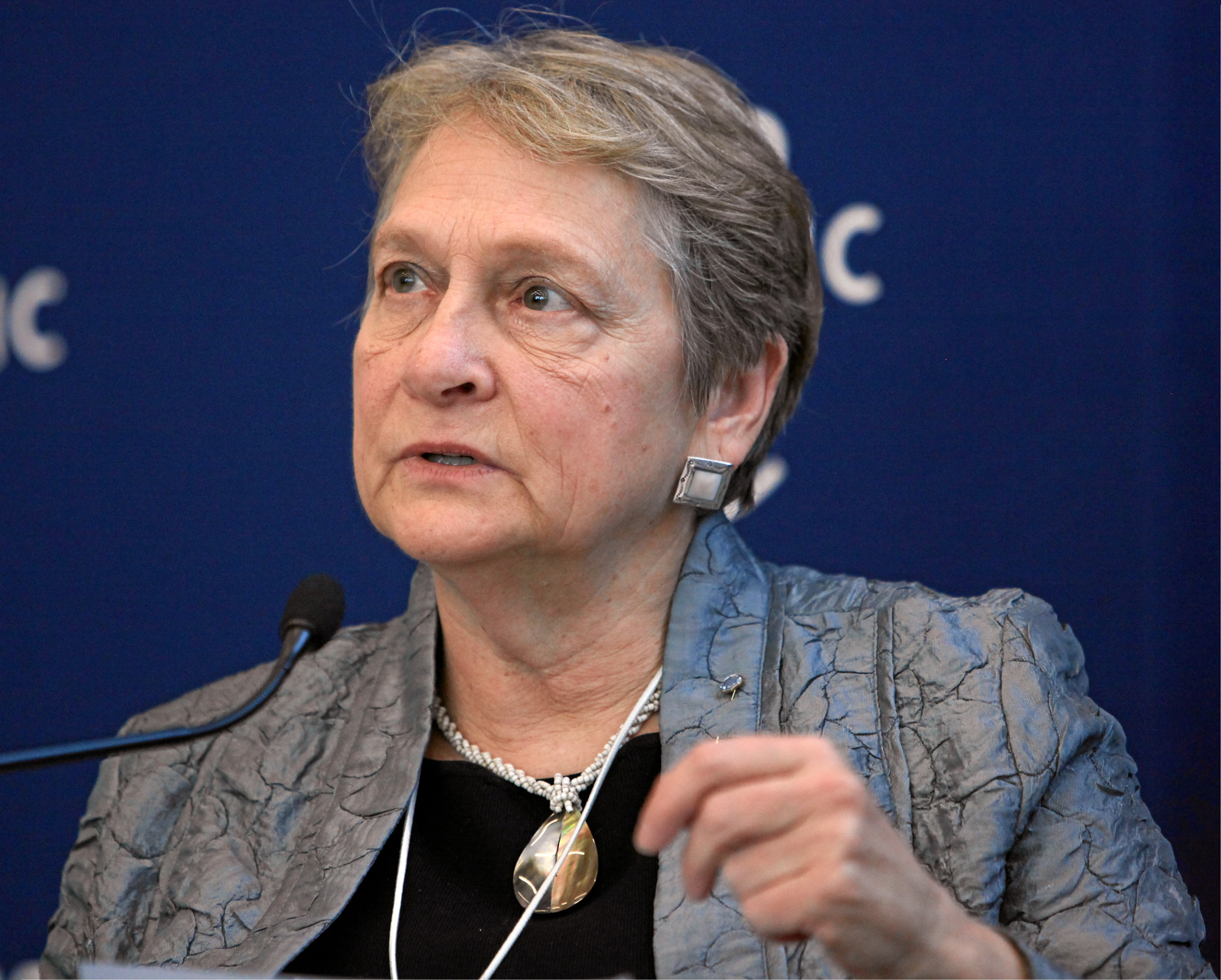
- Liswood in 2012
- Born: Laura Ann Liswood; March 8, 1950 (age 76); Sacramento County, California, U.S.
- Education: California State University, San Diego (BA); University of California, Davis (JD); Harvard University (MBA)
- Occupations: lawyer, author
- Known for: co-founder, Council of Women World Leaders
- Website: www.lauraliswood.com

Laura Ann Liswood (born March 8, 1950) is a speaker, author, and advisor focused on leadership and diversity in the women's community. She is Secretary General of the Council of Women World Leaders, which is composed of 95 women presidents, prime ministers, and heads of government.

== Education ==
Liswood holds a B.A. from California State University, San Diego, a J.D. from the University of California, Davis School of Law, and an M.B.A. (1976) from Harvard Business School,

== Career ==
Liswood's professional experience includes CEO/President of the American Society for Training and Development (ASTD), executive-level consulting at the Boston Consulting Group to Fortune 500 and international companies, and executive positions at Rainier National Bank and at Group W Cable, a subsidiary of Westinghouse Broadcasting and Cable. She received the Westinghouse Award of Excellence for her contributions to women and minorities in the workplace. She has held management positions in the airline industry, including general manager for Pacific Northwest and for TWA.

From 1992-1996, as director of the Women's Leadership Project, Liswood identified global leadership contributions by women heads of state. She interviewed 15 current and former women presidents and prime ministers, which is chronicled in her book and video documentary, Women World Leaders (1996, 2007 and 2009, HarperCollins). Her quest was to find out what it would take for a woman to become President of the United States.

In August 1996, she co-founded the Council of Women World leaders with President Vigdís Finnbogadóttir of Iceland. It is the only organization in the world dedicated to women heads of state and government.

In 1997, Liswood co-founded The White House Project, which is dedicated to electing a woman to political office. Her work with women presidents and prime ministers was the inspiration for the Project, which seeks to change the cultural message in the United States about women as leaders.

In 2000, the U.S. Secretary of Defense appointed her to a three-year term on the Defense Advisory Committee on Women in the Services (DACOWITS).

In 2001, Liswood was named Managing Director, Global Leadership and Diversity for Goldman Sachs, a premier global investment bank. Then from 2002 to 2015, Liswood held the position of Senior Advisor at Goldman Sachs, a global investment bank.

After the events of September 11, 2001, Liswood joined the Washington, D.C. Metropolitan Police Department reserve police force, and retired as a sergeant in 2014.

A former commissioner of the City of Seattle's Women's Commission, Liswood was the owner/publisher of Seattle Woman and is the founder of May's List, a bipartisan political donor network emphasizing women's leadership in the political arena.

== Publications ==
Liswood is the author of Serving Them Right (Harper Business 1991). Liswood's latest book, The Loudest Duck, is a business guide that explores workplace diversity and uses practical stories to offer an alternate, nuanced approach to diversity to create a truly effective workplace for all (Wiley & Sons, November 2009).
