= Christian Sandrock =

Swiss-American physician and professor

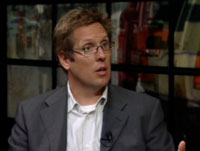
- Sandrock in 2006
- Born: Christian Erik Sandrock; November 17, 1969 (age 56); Cleveland, Ohio
- Citizenship: Switzerland · United States
- Education: Rutgers University (B.A.); Lund University (MPH); Georgetown University (M.D.)
- Occupations: Physician, professor
- Years active: 1996-present
- Employer: UC Davis

Christian Sandrock (born November 17, 1969) is a Swiss-American physician. Throughout his career, Sandrock has contributed to news organizations, newspapers, and magazines, including CNN and the San Francisco Chronicle, as a medical expert. He currently serves as Director of Critical Care at UC Davis Medical Center, Professor of Medicine at University of California, Davis, and as a Board Member at the Mondavi Center.

== Early life and education ==
Sandrock holds an undergraduate degree in English from Rutgers University, a M.D. from Georgetown University, and a Masters in Public Health from Lund University in Sweden. Sandrock received the Pellegrini Scholarship from the Swiss Benevolent Society of New York between the years of 1992 and 1996. Sandrock speaks English and German.

== Career ==
=== Medical practice ===
Beginning in 1996, Sandrock completed his internship, residency, and fellowships at UC Davis. His Infectious Diseases & Pulmonary and Critical Care fellowships were completed in 2005. As of 2020, Sandrock currently serves as the Director of Critical Care, Vice Chair for Quality and Safety, Division Vice Chief of Internal Medicine, and as a Professor of Medicine at University of California, Davis. Sandrock co-founded the long COVID clinic at UC Davis Medical Center.

Sandrock is a former Yolo County Public Health Deputy Health Officer, where he has previously discussed the pertussis outbreak in California in 2010-2011.

Sandrock currently serves as a Board Member at The Mondavi Center, the performing arts center financed by American winemaker Robert Mondavi.

=== Media ===
During various avian influenza outbreaks since the 2000s, the SARS-CoV-1 outbreak, and the COVID-19 pandemic, Sandrock provided expert opinions on vaccines, long COVID, and outbreak management to news organizations in the San Francisco-Bay Area and nationally. National publications include CNN, Newsweek, HuffPost, and Runner's World. Additional publications include the San Francisco Chronicle, SFGate, and FOX40.

In 2021, Sandrock partnered with the company Safer Planet to test and promote their product V-Go, an iPhone attachable product with UV-C light that can be used to sanitize surfaces and inactivate bacteria. He served as Safer Planet's medical advisor.

== See also ==
- List of University of California, Davis faculty
