= Monika Kalra Varma =

- Education: University of California, Davis School of Law (King Hall)
- Scientific career
- Workplaces: Robert F. Kennedy Center for Justice and Human Rights

Monika Satya Kalra Varma is the Director of the Robert F. Kennedy Center for Justice and Human Rights (RFK Center). Varma is on the editorial board of the François-Xavier Bagnoud Health and Human Rights journal at Harvard University. She serves on the advisory board for the Global India Fund. Previously, Varma worked for the International Criminal Tribunal for the former Yugoslavia in The Hague, Netherlands. She received her Juris Doctor degree from the University of California, Davis School of Law, and published "Forced Marriage: Rwanda's Secret Revealed," 11 U.C. Davis Journal of Law & Policy 197-221 (2001).
