= UC Davis School of Law =

Public law school in Davis, California, US

University of California, Davis School of Law
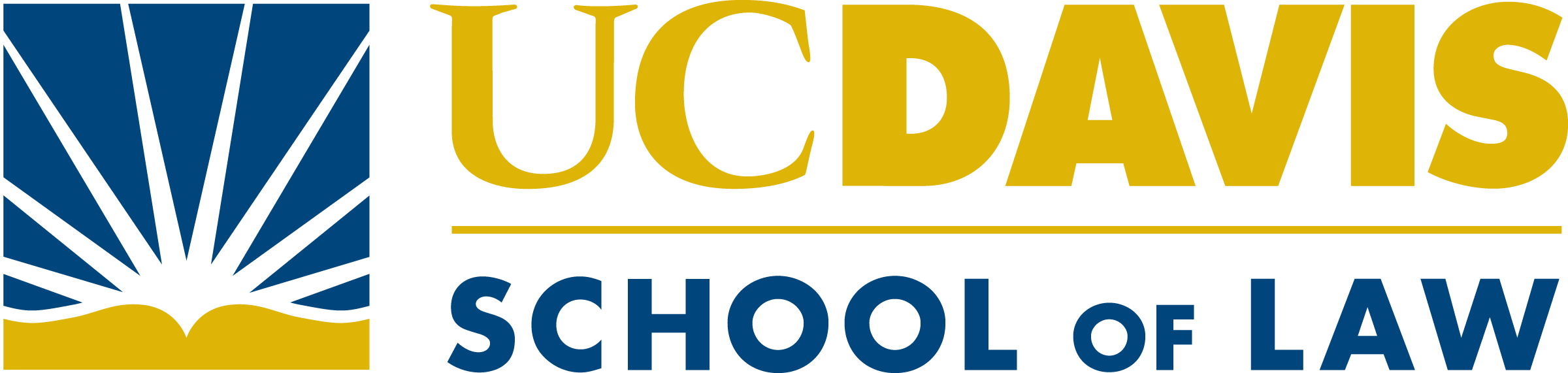
- Motto: Fiat lux (Latin)
- Parent school: University of California
- Established: 1965
- School type: Public
- Parent endowment: $2.2 billion (2021)
- Dean: Jessica Wilen Berg
- Location: Davis, California, U.S. 38°32′09″N 121°44′57″W
- Enrollment: 622
- Faculty: 62
- USNWR ranking: 52nd (tie) (2026)
- Bar pass rate: 93% (July 2025 1st time takers)
- Website: law.ucdavis.edu
- ABA profile: Standard 509 Report

The University of California, Davis School of Law is the professional graduate law school of the University of California, Davis. The school received ABA approval in 1968. It joined the Association of American Law Schools (AALS) in 1968.

UC Davis School of Law is one of five law schools in the University of California system, with a total enrollment of around 600 students. The school is located in King Hall, a building named after Martin Luther King Jr.

== History ==
In July 1962, the Regents of the University of California approved a plan for a law school at the University of California, Davis. Edward L. Barrett, Jr., was appointed as UC Davis Law's first dean on July 1, 1964.

Barrett hired Mortimer Schwartz as the first law librarian, so that a law library could be established right away, and for the founding faculty, hired Daniel Dykstra, Edgar Bodenheimer, Brigitte Bodenheimer, Edward Rabin, and Frank Baldwin.

UC Davis School of Law opened in a temporary space in fall 1966 and moved to a permanent building in fall 1968. For its first entering class in fall 1966, the new law school received 340 applications, accepted 150, enrolled 78, and awarded 68 J.D. degrees in June 1969.

The assassination of Martin Luther King Jr. on April 4, 1968 caused several students and faculty members to suggest renaming the law school after him. Instead, the building housing the law school was formally dedicated as Martin Luther King Jr. Hall on April 12, 1969. The featured speaker was Chief Justice Earl Warren.

== Rankings and academics ==
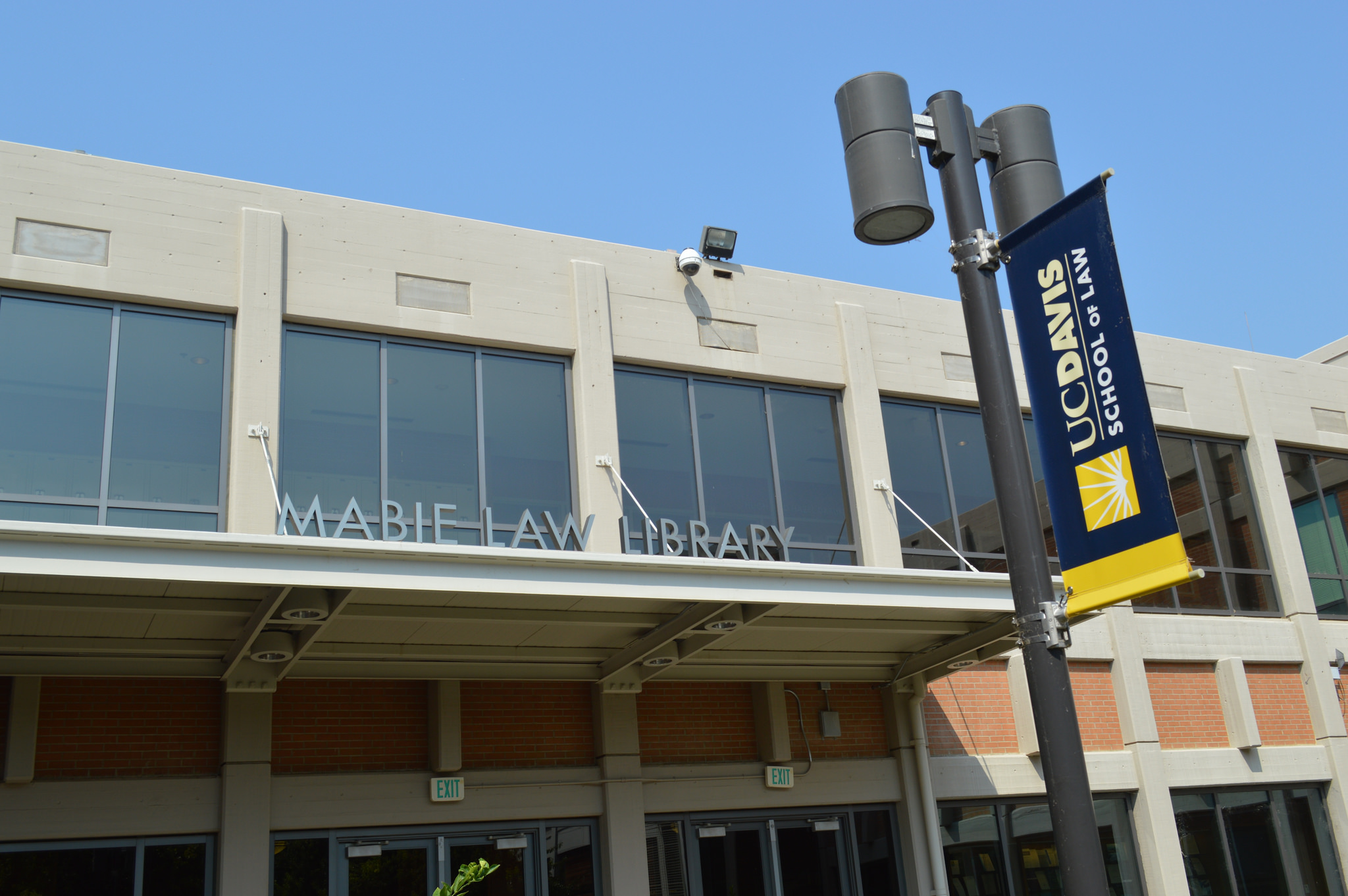
Mabie Law Library

In 2025, U.S. News & World Report ranked UC Davis 50th among all law schools in the United States.

For diversity among the five law schools in the UC system, UC Davis was named the second-most diverse after UC Hastings by U.S. News & World Report. Princeton Review placed UC Davis Law tenth in the nation for faculty diversity in the 2009 version of its annual law ranking. It is listed as an "A−" in the March 2011 "Diversity Honor Roll" by The National Jurist: The Magazine for Law Students.

It is listed as an "A" (#16) in the January 2011 "Best Public Interest Law Schools" ratings by The National Jurist: The Magazine for Law Students.

UC Davis has been ranked as the fifth most-expensive public law school in the nation by U.S. News & World Report. It is also ranked first for providing the most financial aid.

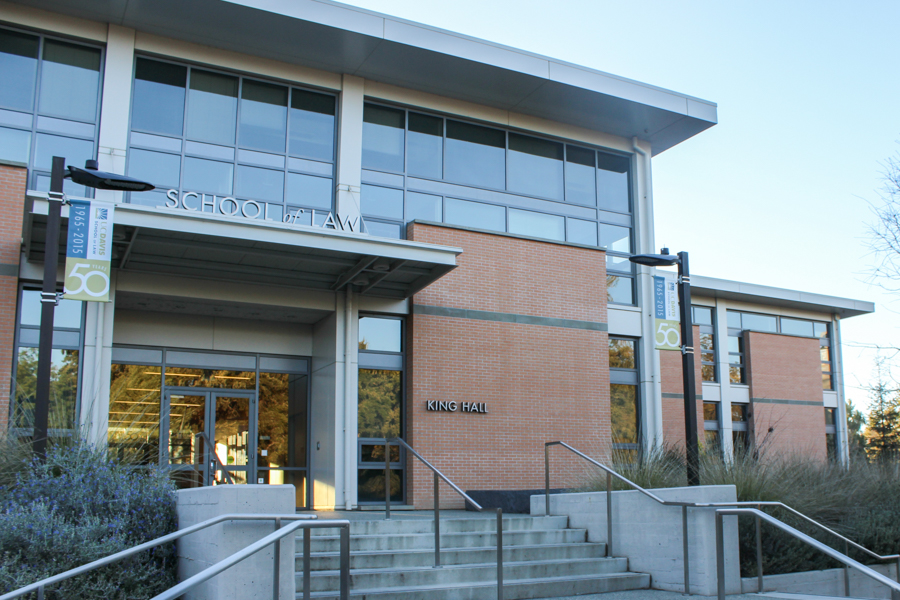
Main Entrance to King Hall

UC Davis grants the second-most in financial aid in the country. UC Davis Law's King Hall Loan Repayment Assistance Program (LRAP), founded in 1990 to help alumni working in relatively low-income public-service law careers to repay student loans, was the first loan repayment assistance program established at any UC law school.

According to Brian Leiter's Law School rankings, Davis ranks 18th in the nation for scholarly impact as measured by total academic citations of tenure-stream faculty.

=== Bar passage rates ===
Based on a 2001-2007 6 year average, 79.4% of UC Davis Law graduates passed the California State Bar exam. In 2009, 89% of first-time test takers passed the California bar.

For July 2012, 78.9% of first-time test takers passed the California bar exam. For July 2013, 85.0% of first-time test takers passed the California Bar Exam.

For July 2014, 86% of first-time test takers passed the California bar exam.

== Employment ==
According to King Hall's official ABA-required disclosures, 94% of the Class of 2025 obtained full-time, long-term, JD-required employment nine months after graduation. King Hall's under-employment score is 4%, indicating the percentage of the Class of 2025 unemployed, pursuing an additional degree, or working in a non-professional, short-term, or part-time job nine months after graduation.

== Costs ==
The total cost of attendance (indicating the cost of tuition, fees, and living expenses) at King Hall for the 2024-2025 academic year is $83,011 for California residents and $95,256 for non-residents.

== Expansion ==
The law school completed a $30 million expansion project in 2011. The project has added an additional wing to the law school's current building, increasing assignable space by nearly 30 percent to provide for additional classrooms, offices, and a new courtroom, named the Paul and Lydia Kalmanovitz Appellate Courtroom in honor of a $1 million gift to the project from the Kalmanovitz Charitable Foundation. The courtroom is used by the U.S. Court of Appeals for the Ninth Circuit, California Supreme Court, and California Court of Appeal.

== Noted people ==
=== Faculty ===
- Vikram Amar, Daniel J. Dykstra Distinguished Professor of Law, scholar of constitutional law, federal courts, and civil procedure
- Jessica Wilen Berg, dean and professor of law
- Alan Brownstein, professor of law emeritus
- Gabriel "Jack" Chin, professor of law, specialist in fields of immigration law and criminal procedure
- Joel Dobris, professor of law emeritus, scholar of trusts, wills, and estates
- Angela P. Harris, professor of law emerita, critical legal theory scholar
- Robert W. Hillman, professor of law emeritus
- Edward Imwinkelried, professor of law emeritus
- Kevin Johnson, distinguished professor, Mabie-Apallas Professor of Public Interest Law and Chicana/o Studies, specialist in civil rights, immigration, and Chicano/a rights law
- Miguel Méndez, professor of law emeritus, evidence law scholar (dec.)
- Rex R. Perschbacher, Daniel J. Dykstra Endowed Chair, lecturer (1981–2016), dean of the law school (1998–2008), professor emeritus (2016–2018). Professor of law, civil procedure, professional responsibility, legal ethics and clinical application of legal education. (dec.)
- Cruz Reynoso, associate justice of the California Supreme Court 1982–1987, professor emeritus. (dec.)
- Martha West, former associate dean; professor of law emerita
- William S. Dodge, professor of law emeritus, international law, international transactions, and international dispute resolution

=== Alumni ===
- Damon Alimouri, criminal defense and civil rights attorney
- Tani Cantil-Sakauye, the 28th chief justice of the Supreme Court of California
- Craig F. Stowers, associate justice (and 18th chief justice) of the Supreme Court of Alaska (dec.)
- Kristina Pickering, associate justice of the Supreme Court of Nevada
- Clint Bolick, associate justice of the Supreme Court of Arizona
- Kelli Evans, associate justice of the Supreme Court of California
- F. Philip Carbullido, associate justice of the Supreme Court of Guam; chief justice 2003-2008
- Luis Alejo, California State Assemblymember and Monterey County supervisor
- Charles Calderon, California State Assemblymember, former majority leader of the California State Senate
- Sharon L. Gleason, chief judge, United States District Court for the District of Alaska
- Elihu Harris, former mayor of Oakland, California
- Ryan T. Holte, judge, United States Court of Federal Claims
- Paul Igasaki, chief judge and chair of the U.S. Department of Labor Administrative Review Board; deputy chief executive officer of Equal Justice Works; former chair of the U.S. Equal Employment Opportunity Commission (EEOC), appointed by President Clinton
- Gus Lee, American author and ethicist
- Laura Liswood, co-founder of the Council of Women World Leaders; senior advisor, Goldman Sachs
- George Miller, Democratic congressman; Ranking Member, United States House Committee on Education and Labor
- Angela E. Oh, activist, former chair of U.S. Senator Barbara Boxer's Federal Judicial Nominations Committee
- Dean D. Pregerson, judge, United States District Court for the Central District of California; son of Judge Harry Pregerson
- Jane A. Restani, chief judge, United States Court of International Trade
- Jim Rogers, city councilman, City of Richmond, California
- Jon Sands, chief federal public defender for the District of Arizona
- Anna Slotky, actress
- Gary D. Solis, adjunct professor of law, Georgetown University Law Center
- Darrell Steinberg, mayor of Sacramento, California State Senate President Pro Tem, (D-Sacramento)
- Arthur Torres, California State Senator; former chairman of the California Democratic Party
- Monika Kalra Varma, director, Robert F. Kennedy Memorial Center for Human Rights (RFK Center)
- Steve White, former presiding judge, Sacramento County Superior Court; former inspector general of the California Department of Corrections and Rehabilitation
