= Brigitte Bodenheimer =

German American jurist (1912-1981)

Brigitte M. Bodenheimer
- Born: Brigitte Marianne Levy; September 27, 1912; Berlin, Prussia
- Died: January 7, 1981 (aged 68); Davis, California, US
- Education: Washington School of Law; University of Heidelberg
- Spouse: Edgar Bodenheimer (m. 1935; died 1981)
- Scientific career
- Fields: Legal studies

Brigitte Marianne Levy Bodenheimer (September 27, 1912 – January 7, 1981) was a German American jurist. Specializing in family law, she was a professor at S.J. Quinney College of Law and UC Davis School of Law.

Born in Berlin to Ernst Levy and Zerline Wolff, Bodenheimer graduated from the University of Heidelberg in 1934. Being Jewish, she immigrated from Nazi Germany that same year and continued her legal education at Columbia Law School (where she met her husband Edgar Bodenheimer) and later University of Washington School of Law.
