= Damon Alimouri =

American criminal defense attorney

- Born: San Gabriel Valley, California, U.S.
- Education: University of Southern California (BA, Political Science and Philosophy); UC Davis School of Law (JD)
- Occupation: Attorney
- Years active: 2016–present
- Known for: Criminal defense, civil rights litigation, representing activists and public figures
- Website: https://alimourilaw.com/

Damon Alimouri is an American criminal defense attorney. Based in Pasadena, California, Alimouri is known for his work on cases involving civil rights, activism, and notable clients.

== Early life and education ==
Alimouri was born around 1990 and raised in San Gabriel Valley, California. Alimouri's father emigrated from Iran. He earned a Bachelor of Arts degree in Political Science and Philosophy from the University of Southern California (USC), where he served as Executive Editor of Ilios: The Undergraduate Journal of Political Science and Philosophy. He graduated from UC Davis School of Law (King Hall). During law school, he interned at the Sacramento County Public Defender’s Office and worked with the Prison Law Office. After law school, Alimouri clerked at the Los Angeles County Public Defender’s Office.

== Career ==
Alimouri initially worked for a criminal defense attorney in Pasadena before founding The Law Office of Damon Alimouri. He represented Thomas Dooley, the nephew of Meghan, Duchess of Sussex in 2019, who was charged with felony resisting arrest. He represented Miguel Antonio, an activist with Refuse Fascism, who was monitored and recorded by an Los Angeles Police Department (LAPD) confidential informant during anti-Trump protest planning meetings at Echo Park United Methodist Church. Antonio was charged with misdemeanors including obstructing public movement, failure to disperse, and failure to comply with a law enforcement order for blocking a freeway in downtown Los Angeles. The first jury trial resulted in a deadlocked jury, with a new trial scheduled. Alimouri described the LAPD surveillance as "unjust and outrageous". He defended members of the "Justice 8," a group of activists charged with felonies related to confronting alleged harassers of street vendors in San Bernardino County. Alimouri initially represented Vanessa Carrasco. Carrasco was initially denied bail. Carrasco ultimately accepted a plea agreement. He later represented Edin Enamorado.

Alimouri represented rapper Boosie Badazz in a firearm possession case after his May 2023 arrest in San Diego. Boosie was initially charged by the state after police, tipped off by an Instagram Live video, found a Glock pistol in his vehicle during a traffic stop. The state charges were dismissed, but federal authorities charged him under 18 U.S.C. § 922(g)(1). He was released on a $50,000 bond. He attended the 2024 BET Hip Hop Awards with Hatch and Blanco. In July 2024, Alimouri and Blanco won a dismissal citing the 9th Circuit's U.S. v. Duarte ruling, which deemed the felon-in-possession statute unconstitutional for non-violent felons post-Bruen (2022). Boosie was the first to have his case dropped under the new ruling. However, prosecutors refiled charges and he accepted a plea agreement with the government in August 2025.

In May 2024, Alimouri represented the family of Isael Orellana, a La Puente man shot and injured by Los Angeles County Sheriff’s deputies, in a lawsuit against the department filed in October 2024. The family alleged that Orellana was experiencing a mental health crisis during the incident, and Alimouri argued that deputies used excessive force. The lawsuit followed an incident where Orellana was shot after allegedly raising a metal paint roller toward deputies, which the Sheriff’s Department described as a weapon.

== Views and advocacy ==
In 2020, he praised the concept of mental health diversion laws as progressive but criticized the Los Angeles County DA’s office under Jackie Lacey for opposing diversion. He cited a case where he represented a schizophrenic graduate student charged with felony stalking; despite prosecutorial opposition, a judge approved diversion. Alimouri expressed concerns about Los Angeles County District Attorney Nathan Hochman's focus on incarceration and high prison sentences rather than probation and rehabilitation. Alimouri cited a case involving his client who faces vandalism and burglary charges after an incident where he allegedly broke into a home, hid in a bathroom, and called for police. Despite no injuries, theft, or prior criminal record, the prosecution offered only a plea deal that would send his client to California state prison.
