= Jessica Wilen Berg =

American attorney

Jessica Wilen Berg is an American attorney and specialist in Bioethics and Public Health Law. She is Dean and Professor of Law at the University of California, Davis School of Law. She previously served as co-Dean at Case Western Reserve University School of Law, the first female co-Dean or Dean in the law school's 129-year history. She is a reference book author in the area of informed consent.

== Education ==
Berg graduated as a Bachelor of Arts from Cornell University in 1991. In 1994, she graduated with a Juris Doctor (JD) from Cornell Law School. She undertook consecutive positions as a fellow at the Institute for Law, Psychiatry and Public Policy at the University of Virginia School of Law (1994), fellow at the Center for Biomedical Ethics, University of Virginia School of Medicine (1994), and Scholar in Excellence at the University of Massachusetts School of Medicine (1996-1996). In 2009 she completed a Masters in Public Health (MPH) at Case Western Reserve University School of Medicine.

== Career ==
Berg taught at several law schools in the US. She was a Fellow at the Center for Biomedical Ethics and the Institute for Law, Psychiatry and Public Policy at the University of Virginia (1994), and a Scholar in Excellence at the University of Massachusetts Medical School (1995 - 1996).

In 1999 she became assistant professor at Case Western University School of Law, where she has successively been Associate Professor (2003), Professor of Law, Bioethics and Public Health (2005–present), Tom J.E. and Bette Lou Walker Professor of Law (2014 to date)/ She is also associate director of the Institute for Global Security Law & Policy (2006 - 2007), associate director of the Law-Medicine Center (2006 - 2014), and co-Dean (2013 - present), together with professor Michael Scharf.

She was Director of Academic Affairs and member of the working group on Healthcare Organizational Ethics of the Institute for Ethics and Emerging Technologies, and Secretary of the Council on Ethical and Judicial Affairs for the American Medical Association. As part of an academic group with Max Mehlman and others, in 2006 she was a recipient of a large NIH research grant to develop guidelines for the use of human subjects in genetic research. In 2008, Berg was named Health Policy Researcher of the Year by the Health Policy Institute of Ohio, and she received the Case Western Reserve University Mather Spotlight Award for Excellence in Research in 2009.

== Works ==
=== Papers ===
Her most-cited academic articles are:

- Wynia, M. K.; Latham, S. R.; Kao, A. C.; Berg, J. W.; Emanuel, L. L. (1999-11-18). "Medical professionalism in society". The New England Journal of Medicine. 341 (21): 1612–1616. doi:10.1056/NEJM199911183412112. PMID 10577119.
- Berg, J. W.; Appelbaum, P. S.; Grisso, T. (1996). "Constructing competence: formulating standards of legal competence to make medical decisions". Rutgers Law Review. 48 (2): 345–371. PMID 16086484.
- Doukas, D. J.; Berg, J. W. (2001). "The family covenant and genetic testing". The American Journal of Bioethics. 1 (3): 3–10. doi:10.1162/152651601750417784. PMID 11954587. S2CID 25185076.

=== Books ===
- Berg, Jessica W.; Appelbaum, Paul S. (2001). Informed consent : legal theory and clinical practice. Oxford: Oxford University Press. ISBN 978-0-19-974778-8. OCLC 253007374. The book has been recommended as a professional reference source on the theory and practice of informed consent.
