= Jon Sands =

Jon M. Sands (born 1956) has been the Federal Public Defender for the District of Arizona since 2004. He served as the chair of the Federal Defender Sentencing Guidelines Committee and chair of the Defender Services Advisory Group. He was formerly co-chair of the Federal Defender Legislative Committee and is currently a member of the Federal Defender Sentencing Guidelines Committee.

Sands graduated magna cum laude from Yale University in 1978, with an undergraduate degree in history. He received a J.D. with honors from the UC Davis School of Law in 1984. From 1984 through 1985, he was a law clerk for Judge Mary M. Schroeder of the Ninth Circuit Court of Appeals.

Sands currently teaches Criminal Procedure and Advanced Criminal Procedure at the Sandra Day O'Connor College of Law. Sands has served as Special Counsel to the United States Sentencing Commission, and prior to joining the Federal Public Defender's office, he was with the Phoenix law firm of Meyer, Hendricks, Victor, Osborn, and Maledon.
