= Judy Genshaft =

American professor and university president

6th President of the University of South Florida
- In office July 5, 2000 – June 30, 2019
- Preceded by: Betty Castor
- Succeeded by: Steven C. Currall

Personal details
- Born: January 7, 1948 (age 78) Canton, Ohio, U.S.
- Spouse: Steven Greenbaum
- Education: University of Wisconsin at Madison (BA); Kent State University (MA, PhD)
- Profession: University president

Judy Lynn Genshaft (/ˈɡɛnˌʃæft/; born January 7, 1948) is the former President of University of South Florida, where she served from 2000 to 2019. She stepped down from the position in July 2019 after a 19-year tenure.

== Early life and education ==
Genshaft was born and raised in Canton, Ohio, in 1948. Her father, a Russian immigrant, fled to the United States because of conscription. Her mother is a Canton native with family roots in Russia.

She graduated from University of Wisconsin at Madison with a Bachelor of Arts in social work and psychology in 1969. She completed her master's degree in 1973 and doctorate in 1975 at Kent State University in school counseling and counseling psychology, respectively.

== Career ==
Genshaft joined the faculty of Ohio State University in 1976 as an assistant professor in school psychology. She was the chair of the Department of Educational Services and Research at Ohio State from 1987 to 1992, rising to the role of chair of OSU's senate from 1990 to 1991.

In 1992, Genshaft became dean of the school of Education at the University at Albany. After a national search and recommended by the search committee, Hitchcock promoted her to Vice President of Academic Affairs. She became the provost at the university at Albany in 1997.

=== President at University of South Florida ===
Genshaft began her tenure as president of USF in July 2000.

From 2000 to 2007, USF grew federally-funded research 213 percent, reported to be the fastest rate of any university in the country.

Genshaft named NFL Hall of Famer Lee Roy Selmon as USF's director of athletics in May 2001.

Following the September 11, 2001 attacks, USF professor Sami Al-Arian was interviewed by Fox News commentator Bill O'Reilly regarding his connections to Ramadan Shalah, leader of the Islamic Jihad Movement in Palestine. The interview led to bomb threats and the resulting evacuation of a campus building, and in October 2001, Genshaft placed Al-Arian on paid administrative leave and prohibited him from entering USF property, saying she believed his presence would compromise campus security. On Dec. 19, 2001, USF's board of trustees voted 12 to 1 in favor of a resolution that President Genshaft act should dismiss Al-Arian "as quickly as university processes will allow." The next day, the university's provost sent Al-Arian an intent to terminate for cause letter. Both the Faculty Senate and the United Faculty of Florida condemned the proposed termination on grounds of academic freedom. The UFF also said campus security concerns were exaggerated. After his response to the termination letter, Genshaft decided to leave Al-Arian on paid leave while investigations continued. The FBI arrested Al-Arian on February 26, 2003. The government alleged Al-Arian was the North American leader of the Palestinian Islamic Jihad (PIJ) and had raised funds and organized activities to support the murder of more than 100 people. He was charged with racketeering and conspiracy to commit murder. Six days later, Genshaft fired Al-Arian. Al-Arian eventually pled down to providing support to members of the Palestinian Islamic Jihad and was sentenced to 57 months in prison.

In 2002, Genshaft created a new honors college for USF, which had previously only had an honors program. The college was named the Judy Genshaft Honors College and a building opened in May 2023.

Genshaft fired medical school dean Robert Daugherty in October 2003 after he allegedly violated university rules when he requested that his staff contribute to the campaign of state House Speaker Johnnie Byrd.

During Genshaft's tenure, the University of South Florida moved the six-year graduation rate from 48% to 73%. The four-year graduation rate increased from 24% to 61%.

She received $879,506 in compensation for the 2015–2016 academic year, ranking her as the 11th highest paid university president in the United States. After 2015, her contract was renewed year-to-year rather than spanning five years. In March 2017, USF's board of trustees voted to provide her with a total compensation package $924,547, including a base salary of $505,837 with 37% of the total package tied to performance. Under Florida law, state funding for the president's salary is capped at $200,000. USF uses private funding to make up the difference.

In 2017, adjunct faculty at USF protested Genshaft and the university for opposing efforts to unionize adjunct faculty. The protesting adjunct professors were supported by Hillsborough County Commissioner Pat Kemp.”

By 2018, USF had met 11 of the 12 metrics for the "full preeminence standard" set by the Florida Board of Governors. Four-year graduation rates at USF improved from 20% in the early 2000s to 60% in 2018. Also in 2018, Genshaft wrapped up the university's fundraising campaign after reaching $1 billion in commitments.

In June 2019, Genshaft and her husband, Steven Greenbaum, donated $20 million to USF for the construction of a new honors college. She also donated $3 million to endow a deanship for the honors college.

=== Community involvement ===
During her tenure, she served as chairperson of the Tampa Bay Partnership and the Greater Tampa Chamber of Commerce. She also served as a director of American Momentum Bank and as chairperson of the Division I NCAA Board of Directors and of the American Council on Education Board.

=== Retirement ===
Genshaft retired as president of USF in July 2019. After retiring as president, she was named president emerita.

== Recognition ==
Genshaft received leadership awards from Princess Sirindhorn of Thailand. She has received an honorary degree from Yeungnam University and Saint Ignatius of Loyola University. In 2012, the USF marching band dedicated its first half time show of the 2012–13 season to her.

== Personal life ==
Genshaft married Steven Greenbaum in 1989 and has two sons. Genshaft's brother is Neil Genshaft, chief executive officer of Fresh Mark. Genshaft decided not to live in the on-campus residence, the 9,000-square-foot Lifsey House, and lives in the Tampa Palms neighborhood near campus.
