= Colin Carter =

American professor (born 1954)

Colin A. Carter
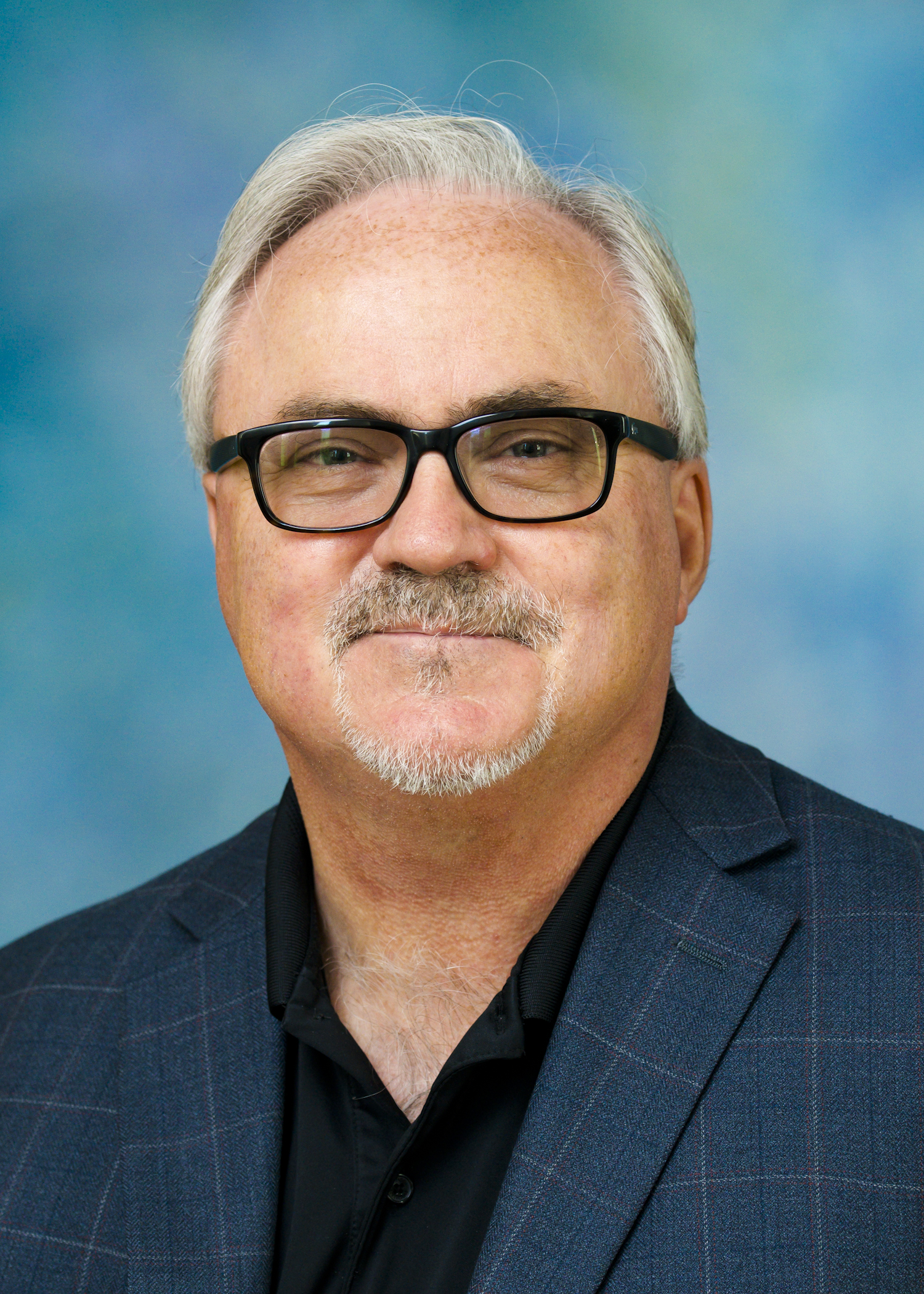
- A photo of Colin Carter from May 2015.
- Born: January 30, 1954 (age 72); Sexsmith, Alberta, Canada

Academic background
- Education: University of Alberta, University of California, Berkeley

Academic work
- Discipline: Agricultural economics
- Institutions: University of California, Davis

Colin Andre Carter (born January 30, 1954) is Distinguished Professor Emeritus of Agricultural and Resource Economics at the University of California, Davis. His research/teaching interests include international commodity trade, agricultural policy, and price formation and competition in commodity markets.

Carter is an Albertan. He was born and raised on a grain farm in Sexsmith, Alberta, Canada. He obtained a BA in economics and an MS in Agricultural Economics from the University of Alberta. He then studied at University of California, Berkeley where he completed an MA in economics and a Ph.D. in Agricultural Economics in 1980. From 1980 to 1986, he was a Professor in Agricultural Economics at the University of Manitoba, before moving to the University of California Davis. He is currently Distinguished Professor Emeritus at UC Davis, where he worked for over 35 years.

Carter has published more than 175 research papers, and has authored or edited 15 books. He has published in the areas of international trade, commodity markets, agricultural policy, futures and options markets, the economics of China's agriculture, and the economics of agricultural biotechnology. Colin has received a number of professional awards for Quality of Research Discovery; for Quality of Communication, and for Distinguished Policy Contribution. In 2001, he won the American Agricultural Economics Association (AAEA) award for "Outstanding Essay for the 21st Century" for Will China Become a Major Force in World Food Markets?, co-authored with Scott Rozelle. Carter was named Fellow of AAEA in 2000 in recognition of his contributions to the field of agricultural economics.

Carter has written a textbook on Futures and Options Markets and at UC Davis taught an undergraduate class on futures and options markets and a graduate class on international commodity trade. In 2013, he was listed as one of the 15 Commodity-Friendly professors.

Since 1985, he has travelled extensively to China, studying China's domestic commodity markets and China's participation in the international agricultural market. In 1988, with Professor Funing Zhong from Nanjing Agricultural University, he published one of the first books to explain the economic effects of the decollectivization of China's agriculture. Colin has published numerous journal articles on China including “Advances in Chinese Agriculture and its Global Implications” in 2012 with Zhong and Zhu.

Carter has taken an active role in national and international professional societies. From 1986 to 1989, he held a 3-year fellowship in international food systems from the Kellogg Foundation. Colin served as chair of the UC Davis Department of Agricultural and Resource Economics from 1998 to 2001. He also served as Chair of the University of California's Giannini Foundation of Agricultural Economics. from 1998–1999, 2000, and 2009–2009. From 2018 to 2020, Professor Carter was Chair of the Research Council of the J.P. Morgan Center for Commodities, University of Colorado Business School.

Carter has extensive litigation experience as an economics expert witness, dealing with the following commodities: wheat, corn, barley, rice, orange juice, hogs, cattle, onions, strawberries, tomatoes, potatoes, tuna, broiler chickens and pesticides. He has worked on a number of legal cases involving the economics of commodity markets and he has testified in court and in three different countries and in front of domestic and international trade tribunals. Colin has worked on a number of international antidumping cases as an expert witness. He has written numerous economic reports for litigation purposes and has been deposed over thirty times as an economics expert. Often, his analysis involves estimating economic damages or measuring the market impacts of international commodity trade. He has also testified on the economics of state-trading monopolies such as the former Canadian Wheat Board.

== See also ==
- List of University of California, Davis faculty
