= Robert W. Hillman =

Distinguished Professor of Law Emeritus at UC Davis School of Law

Robert W. Hillman (born 12 April 1949) is a Distinguished Professor of Law Emeritus at UC Davis School of Law, where he held the Fair Business Practices and Investor Advocacy Chair until his retirement in 2020. He is a scholar in the fields of international business transactions, securities regulation, legal ethics, and corporate and partnership law who has served as a consultant to the World Bank's Chinese University Development Project, as a member of the Advisory Group for the American Law Institute's Restatement (Third) of the Law of Agency, and a member of the California State Senate's Blue Ribbon Task Force on Shareholder Litigation. He has taught at Duke, NYU, Georgia, Florida State, and the University of International Business and Economics in Beijing. His many publications include the books Hillman on Lawyer Mobility: The Law and Ethics of Partner Withdrawals and Law Firm Breakups , (Aspen, 2d ed. 1998; Little Brown, 1st ed. 1994) and Law Firm Breakups: The Law and Ethics of Grabbing and Leaving, (Little, Brown & Co. 1990), The Revised Uniform Partnership Act (Thomson Reuters)(co-authored), Securities Regulation: Cases and Materials (Aspen)(co-authored), as well as numerous scholarly articles in leading law journals.

In 2006, he led an International Senior Lawyers Project Team providing support for the Liberian government in the renegotiation of an iron ore development contract with Arcelor Mittal. He provided additional support to the Liberian government in its negotiation of natural resource contracts, particularly in the rubber and iron ore industries.

He recently has been called upon by media for expert commentary on issues including the collapse of Dewey LeBoeuf, the federal bailout of American Insurance Group and securities regulation.

He received a B.A. in Political Science from California State University, Long Beach in 1970 and a J.D. from Duke University School of Law in 1973, where he was editor-in-chief of the law journal.
