= Jonathan M. Scholey =

Jonathan M. Scholey (born 1955 in Yorkshire, England) is a cell biologist and distinguished professor emeritus from the department of molecular and cellular biology at the University of California, Davis. He worked on the cell biology of motor proteins, notably mitotic and intraflagellar transport (IFT) motors, and the mechanisms of mitosis and ciliogenesis. He taught undergraduate and graduate classes in biochemistry, biophysics and cell biology.

== Education and career ==
He earned a B.Sc. in Cell and Molecular Biology with first-class honors from King's College London, Biophysics Department / MRC Cell Biophysics Unit in 1977, where his personal tutors were the muscle biophysicist, Dr Gerald Offer and the evolutionary cell biologist, Dr Tom Cavalier-Smith. He then pursued doctoral studies at the MRC Laboratory of Molecular Biology and Trinity College, Cambridge, completing a Ph.D. in Molecular Biology in 1981 under the supervision of the biochemist, Dr Jake Kendrick-Jones. His doctoral research focused on the regulation of myosin-2 motors, which function in muscle contraction and cytokinesis, by calcium ions and light chain phosphorylation.

From 1982 to 1986, Scholey held a traveling postdoctoral fellowship from the Medical Research Council, and a basic science exchange fellowship from the British Heart Foundation and American Heart Association, to work on a project aimed at identifying novel proteins important for mitotic spindle function in the lab of the cell biologist, Dr J. Richard McIntosh at the Department of MCDB, University of Colorado, Boulder. In the McIntosh lab, he and his coworkers found that kinesin motors localize to mitotic spindles, and contributed to the identification of cytoplasmic dynein by isolating it from Caenorhabditis elegans, an organism that lacks motile cilia and flagella. This postdoctoral research formed the foundation of his subsequent research on mitotic motor proteins.

In 1986 Scholey was appointed a staff scientist on the faculty of the Division of Molecular and Cell Biology at the National Jewish Hospital and Research Center in Denver, where, as a Basil O'Connor Starter Scholar, he first established his independent research group which, with advice from the Kappler-Marrack immunology lab, focused on developing monoclonal antibodies that inhibit kinesin motor activity. In 1989 he moved his group to the University of California, Davis, joining the Departments of Zoology and Molecular and Cellular Biology, where he remained until his retirement in 2015. There he taught courses in biochemistry, biophysics and cell biology and, with members of the iBiology team, developed a "flipped" cell biology course. He also worked as a visiting Fulbright Scholar teaching in the Department of Molecular Biology and Genetics at Bosphorus University in Istanbul, Türkiye.

He was elected chair of the 1996 Gordon Research Conference on Motile and Contractile Systems. He served on the Editorial Boards of The Journal of Biological Chemistry, Molecular Biology of the Cell, and Cytoskeleton, and during 2012-2015 he was a member of the NIH Cell Biology study section (Nuclear and Cytoplasmic Structure, Function and Dynamics). In 2017 he was inducted as a Fellow of the American Society for Cell Biology (ASCB)

== Research ==
The research of the Scholey lab focused on the molecular mechanisms underlying mitosis and ciliogenesis, with particular emphasis on the roles of motor proteins notably kinesins and dyneins. An early contribution to the field was the development and sharing of monoclonal antibodies that inhibit kinesin-driven motility and were used; (i) to help identify the kinesin superfamily motor domain; (ii) to demonstrate that kinesin-1 contributes to the organization of the interphase endomembrane system; and (iii) to provide evidence that kinesin-1 associates with mitotic spindle-associated endomembranes.

In mitosis research, based mainly on studies using Drosophila syncitial embryos, he became a proponent of the theory that kinesin-5 motors are bipolar homotetramers with pairs of motor domains at opposite ends of a central rod,, capable of mediating a sliding filament mechanism. This mechanism is proposed to allow kinesin-5 to cooperate with other mitotic motors to orchestrate several aspects of mitotic spindle function, e.g. anaphase B spindle elongation. Scholey lab research on mitotic motors and spindle mechanics extended to the mathematical modeling of aspects of mitosis and to an interest in mitotic spindle membranes.

In the field of ciliogenesis, his laboratory discovered and characterized heterotrimeric kinesin-2, an anterograde motor which they found to be essential for ciliary assembly on swimming sea urchin embryos. In parallel research using Chlamydomonas, the Rosenbaum lab discovered intraflagellar transport and found that heterotrimeric kinesin-2 transports protein complexes essential for ciliogenesis (named IFT particles) to the ciliary tips. Scholey and colleagues went on to demonstrate that kinesin-2 exists in both heterotrimeric and homodimeric forms in Caenorhabditis elegans sensory neuronal cilia, where the two forms cooperate with the retrograde motor, dynein-2, to drive intraflagellar transport (IFT) which contributes to the delivery of tubulin to the ciliary tips and to the structural and functional diversity of sensory cilia.
