= Alan Brownstein =

American legal scholar

Alan E. Brownstein
- Born: c. 1947 (age 78–79); United States
- Education: Antioch College (BA); Harvard Law School (JD)
- Scientific career
- Fields: Constitutional law, The First Amendment
- Workplaces: University of California, Davis School of Law

Alan E. Brownstein (born c. 1947) is Professor of Law and the Boochever and Bird Chair for the Study and Teaching of Freedom and Equality at the UC Davis School of Law (King Hall). Before becoming a professor, he clerked for Judge Frank M. Coffin of the United States Court of Appeals for the First Circuit. Professor Brownstein is well known for his scholarship on the Establishment Clause of the First Amendment. He has frequently commented on the intersection of religion and civil liberties with regard to marriage equality and Proposition 8. He serves on the legal committee of the ACLU of Northern California.

He received a B.A. in Political Science and Psychology from Antioch College in 1969 and a J.D. from Harvard Law School in 1977.
