= Jinyi Qi =

Chinese professor of biomedical engineering

Jinyi Qi (祁锦毅) is a professor at the Department of Biomedical Engineering in the University of California, Davis. He was named Fellow of the Institute of Electrical and Electronics Engineers (IEEE) in 2014 for contributions to statistical image reconstruction for emission-computed tomography. He graduated from Tsinghua University.
