= Amy Block Joy =

American academic

Amy Block Joy is an Emerita Professor at the University of California, Berkeley. She is best known for exposing fraudulent activity in a California nutrition education program. She specializes in nutrition and health disparities of diverse populations, nutritional ecology, and ethics. She is an author and advocate for whistleblowers and employee rights. Joy was formerly a Cooperative Extension Specialist, Emeritus at the University of California, Davis

== Career ==
Amy Block Joy earned a bachelor's degree in Biochemistry and Bacteriology from the University of California, Berkeley in 1974 and a Ph.D. in Nutritional Sciences from the University of California, Berkeley in 1979. The following year she was hired as a University of California, Berkeley campus Specialist in Nutrition. She took a sabbatical to the London School of Hygiene and Tropical Medicine in 1992. There she developed a proposal to help poor families improve their economic and nutritional well-being, which was subsequently funded by the US Department of Agriculture.

Upon her return to the US, she joined the University of California, Davis faculty in the Department of Nutrition. From 1994, Joy was director of the UC Food Stamp Nutrition Education Program, which provided nutrition education to low-income families throughout California. In 2007, Joy stepped down as director of the program.

She was reassigned to a one-woman department, Nutritional Ecology, exploring topics including nutritional controversy, health impacts on the environment, nutritional policies, and food safety. Joy is now a professor emerita at the University of California, Berkeley, where she also serves as the president of the UC Berkeley Emeriti Association.

== Whistleblower report ==
In August 2006, Joy filed a whistleblower report over fraudulent activities within the UC Food Stamp Nutrition Education Program. UC Davis reached a settlement with Joy over retaliation for whistleblowing, paying her $89,611. An investigation by the university and the US Department of Agriculture verified many of her allegations. As a result, the California Department of Social Services withheld $2.3 million in funding from UC Davis and the program's participating counties, and one of her colleagues was charged with theft. She claims that the theft was covered up by administrators that looked to the perpetrator for help in acquiring equipment for the faculty. The retaliation included trying to scapegoat Joy for the incident.

In 2010, she received a settlement from UC Davis. She has since published several books on her experience, including Whistleblower published in 2010 by Bay Tree Press, in addition to two further self-published works. The Routledge edited volume Fight the Tower: Asian American Women Scholars’ Resistance and Renewal in the Academy called her experience “one of the most well-known cases of whistleblowing in academia”.

== Published work ==
In 1985, she published "California EFNEP Evaluation Study" at Berkeley. It was the first experimentally-designed study of the effectiveness of nutrition education and discussed in the book New Directions for Evaluation.

In 2006, she published the first cost-benefit analysis to measure cost effectiveness of nutrition education in California. The analysis is discussed in the 2016 version of Community Health Nursing: Caring for the Public's Health.

Joy has authored three books about her whistleblower experience:

- Whistleblower (Bay Tree Publishing, ISBN 9780981957753)
- Retaliation (self-published by CreateSpace, OCLC 880358227)
- Blowback: The Unintended Consequences of Exposing a Fraud (self-published by CreateSpace, ISBN 978-1542999663)

She began writing books in order to educate future whistleblowers.

She is an associate editor of California Agriculture, a peer reviewed journal. She has also published articles in Compliance and Ethics Professional.
