= Joel Dobris =

American lawyer

- Born: c. 1940 (age 85–86)
- Education: Yale University; University of Minnesota Law School
- Scientific career
- Fields: Trusts and Estates
- Workplaces: University of California, Davis School of Law

Joel C. Dobris (born c. 1940) is a Professor of Law at the UC Davis School of Law (King Hall). Dobris is one of the most cited legal academics in the country in the area of the law of Wills, Trusts, and Estates. His book, Estates and Trusts, is a widely used textbook at American law schools.

He received a B.A. in English from Yale College in 1963 and an LL.B. from the University of Minnesota Law School in 1966.
