= Richard Coss =

American psychologist and academic

Richard Gerrit Coss
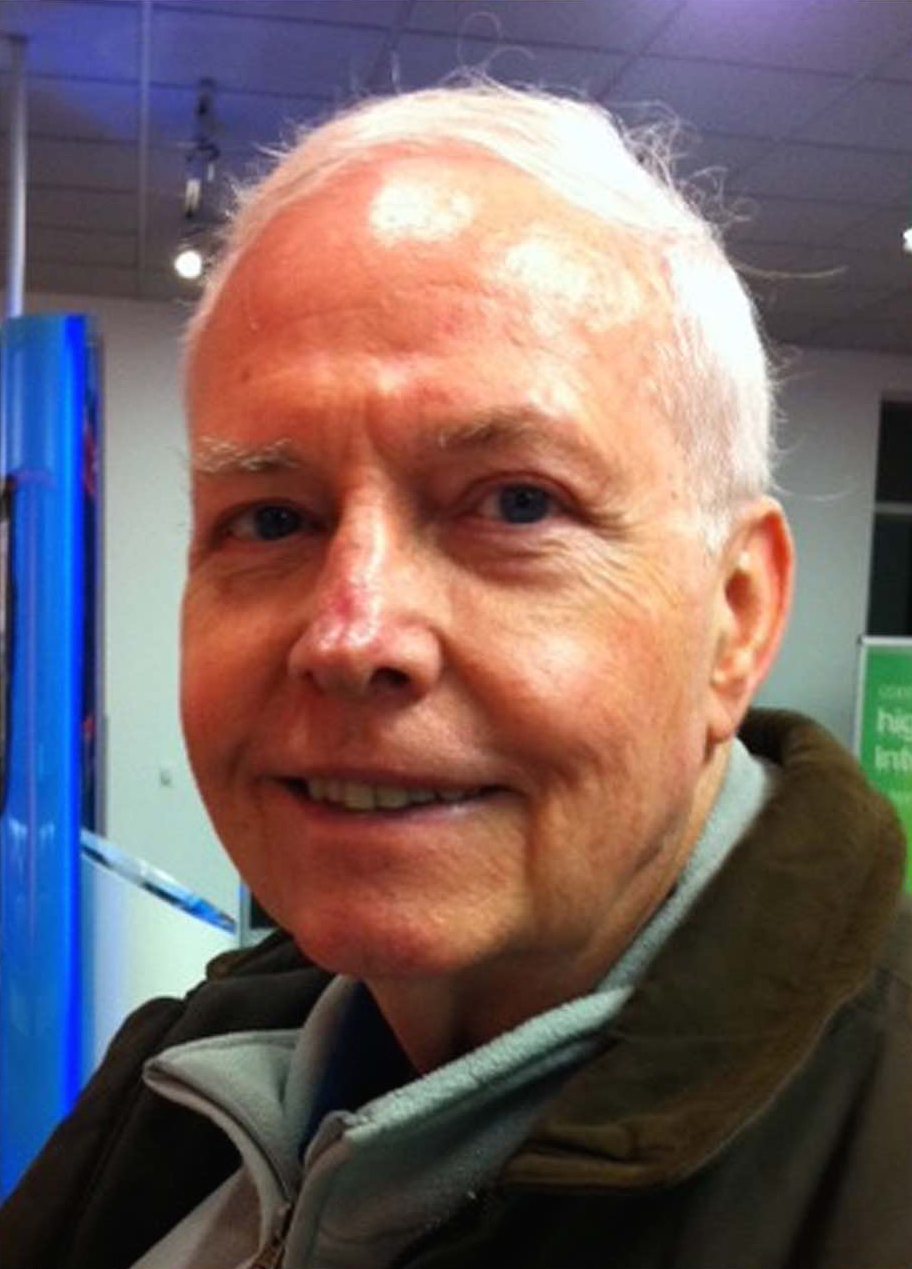
- Occupations: Evolutionary psychologist and academic

Academic background
- Education: B.S. in Architecture; M.A. in Design; PhD in Comparative psychology
- Alma mater: University of Southern California; University of California; University of Reading

Academic work
- Institutions: University of California

Richard Gerrit Coss is an American evolutionary psychologist and academic. He is a professor emeritus of Psychology at the University of California, Davis.

Coss is a Fellow of the Association for Psychological Science.

== Education and career ==
After completing his early education, he enrolled at the University of Southern California and graduated in 1962 with a major in Industrial Design in the School of Architecture. Later in 1966, he earned his master's degree in design from the University of California, Los Angeles. In 1973, he completed his Ph.D. in Comparative psychology at the University of Reading in the UK.

Coss is a professor emeritus of Psychology at the University of California, Davis.

== Research ==
Coss' work analyzed the antipredator behavior of different species in both field and laboratory conditions as model systems for understanding the development of innate behavior and aesthetic preferences in the context of human evolutionary history.

=== Behavioral evolution and environmental aesthetics ===
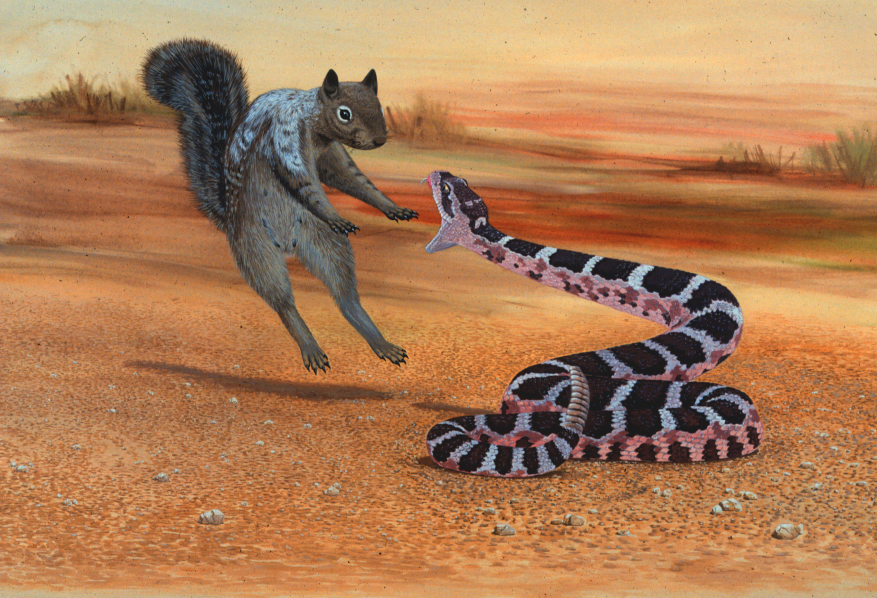
Painting by Richard Coss (1981) derived from video showing a female California ground squirrel jumping back after being struck in the face by a rattlesnake. The low facial swelling observed afterwards prompted research on adaptive variation in ground squirrel physiological resistance to rattlesnake venom.

Coss published a monograph in 1965 that described his visual perception research based on his theory that human ancestors were the prey of predators for a sufficient evolutionary time to engender innate recognition of predator features including two-facing eyes, sharp teeth, and claws. Subsequently, he posited that recognizing such specific provocative shapes enhanced emotional arousal in a manner that have had an impact on works of art, architecture, and product design.

=== Innate pattern recognition ===
Coss elucidated that the salient effects of glossy and sparkling surface finishes attract infants and toddlers, increasing the possibilities of endangering their life by drowning or suffocation from plastic bags and described that viewing water has calming effects on adults. Furthermore, he discovered that wild California ground squirrels, white-faced capuchin monkeys, and bonnet macaques are capable of recognizing their snake predators by their size and scale patterns and, for bonnet macaques, their leopard predators by the spots on their coat. He later documented that young human infants are visually attracted reliably to snake-scale and leopard-spot patterns.

=== Dendritic spine plasticity ===
Coss evaluated the provocative effects of two-facing eyes in humans and worked on the brain development and behavior of jewel fish which led his work to a cover article in Science. His joint study with A. Globus revealed that, due to social deprivation, the formation of dendritic branches in the optic tectum was arrested as was the experience-based shortening of dendritic spine stems.

=== Evolutionary constraints ===
Coss also conducted a research series to explore the sources of natural selection mediating human brain evolution. This led to experiments measuring flight distances of wild horses in Arizona and African zebras to an approaching human. The lower fear of wild horses compared with zebras led to his hypothesis that extensive human hunting in Africa might have led to an arm's race for more competent hunting by humans to counter the increasingly evasive ability of wary prey.

== Bibliography ==
=== Books ===
- Coss, Richard G. (1965). Mood Provoking Visual Stimuli: Their Origins and Applications (Thesis). Los Angeles: University of California. OCLC 5332767.
- Coss, Richard G., ed. (2005). Environmental Awareness: Evolutionary, Aesthetic & Social Perspectives. Dubuque, IA: Kendall/Hunt. ISBN 0-7575-2011-1.

=== Selected articles ===
- Coss, Richard G. (June 1968). "The ethological command in art". Leonardo. 1 (3): 273–287. doi:10.2307/1571871. JSTOR 1571871.
- Coss, Richard G.; Perkel, Donald H. (September 1985). "The function of dendritic spines: A review of theoretical issues". Behavioral and Neural Biology. 44 (2): 151–185. doi:10.1016/S0163-1047(85)90170-0. PMID 2415102.
- Coss, Richard G. (1999). "Effects of relaxed natural selection on the evolution of behavior". In Foster, Susan A.; Endler, John A. (eds.). Geographic Variation in Behavior: Perspectives on Evolutionary Mechanisms. Oxford: Oxford University Press. pp. 180–208. doi:10.1093/oso/9780195082951.003.0013. ISBN 978-0-19-508295-1.
- Coss, Richard G. (2003). "The role of evolved perceptual biases in art and design". In Voland, Eckart; Grammer, Karl (eds.). Evolutionary Aesthetics. Springer. pp. 69–130. doi:10.1007/978-3-662-07142-7_4. ISBN 978-3-662-07142-7.
- Coss, Richard G. (2017). "Drawings of representational images by Upper Paleolithic humans and their absence in Neanderthals reflect historical differences in hunting wary game". Evolutionary Studies in Imaginative Culture. 1 (2): 15–38. doi:10.26613/esic.1.2.46.
- Coss, Richard G.; Keller, Craig M. (June 2022). "Transient decreases in blood pressure and heart rate with increased subjective level of relaxation while viewing water compared with adjacent ground". Journal of Environmental Psychology. 81 101794. doi:10.1016/j.jenvp.2022.101794.
