= Andrew Hargadon =

Professor Andrew Hargadon is the Charles J. Soderquist Chair in Entrepreneurship and a professor of Technology Management at the Graduate School of Management, University Of California, Davis.

Professor Hargadon is the founding director of the Center for Entrepreneurship and the Energy Efficiency Center at UC Davis. His research focuses on the effective management of innovation and entrepreneurship, particularly in the development and commercialization of sustainable technologies. Professor Hargadon is the author of How Breakthroughs Happen: The Surprising Truth About How Companies Innovate, which was published by Harvard Business School Press in 2003.

Professor Hargadon earned his Ph.D. from Stanford University's School of Engineering, and was named Boeing Fellow and Sloan Foundation Future Professor of Manufacturing. He received his B.S. and M.S. in Stanford University's Mechanical Engineering Department.
