= Joseph Teran =

American mathematician (born 1977)

Joseph M. Teran
- Born: 1977 (age 48–49)
- Education: UC Davis (BS 2000); Stanford (PhD 2005)
- Known for: Scientific computing
- Scientific career
- Fields: Applied mathematics
- Workplaces: University of California, Davis, University of California, Los Angeles
- Doctoral advisor: Ronald Fedkiw

Joseph M. Teran is an American professor of applied mathematics at the University of California, Davis. His research considers numerical methods for partial differential equations based on classical physics, including applications in virtual surgery and movie special effects.

He played a role in simulating snow and ice in the film Frozen, collaborating with Disney's animators.

== Education and career ==
After graduating from the University of California, Davis, in 2000, Teran completed a Ph.D. at Stanford University in 2005. His dissertation, Novel Finite Element Algorithms With Applications To Skeletal Muscle Simulation, was supervised by Ronald Fedkiw.

He was a postdoctoral researcher at the Courant Institute of Mathematical Sciences from 2005 to 2007, and a faculty member at the University of California, Los Angeles from 2007 to 2020. In 2020 he returned to the University of California, Davis as a professor of mathematics.

== Recognition ==
Teran's accolades include:

- 2018: Fellow of the American Mathematical Society
- 2012: Distinguished Alumni Scholar in Computer Science at Stanford University
- 2011: Presidential Early Career Award for Scientists and Engineers
- 2010: Young Investigator Award from the Office of Naval Research
- 2008: Recognized as one of the "20 Best Brains Under 40" by Discover Magazine
