= Ermias Kebreab =

Eritrean animal scientist and ecologist

- Education: University of Asmara; University of Reading
- Occupations: Animal scientist, ecologist

Ermias Kebreab is an Eritrean animal scientist and ecologist. He is the Sesnon Endowed Chair Professor in the department of animal science at the University of California, Davis.

Kebreab attended the University of Asmara, earning his BS degree in biology in 1987. He then attended the University of Reading, earning his MS degree in integrative biology in 1991, and his PhD degree in ecological modeling in 1998. In 2011, he co-published the article Production Performance and Nitrogen Flow of Shaver White Layers Housed in Enriched or Conventional Cage Systems.
