= Martha West =

American law professor

- Born: 1946 (age 79–80); Pomona, California
- Education: Brandeis University (AB); Indiana University Maurer School of Law (JD)

Martha Smeltzer West (born 1946) an American attorney and legal scholar who served as general counsel for the American Association of University Professors and Professor Emerita at the UC Davis School of Law. In 1998, she won California's first federal grant under the Violence Against Women Act, using the money to found the Family Protection and Legal Assistance Clinic at UC Davis Law School. West was the lead author of the 2005 white paper "Unprecedented Urgency: Gender Discrimination in Faculty Hiring at the University of California" and of the 2006 AAUP report "Organizing around Gender Equity."

== Early life and education ==
In 1946, West was born in Pomona, California. In 1967, West earned a Bachelor of Arts degree in history from Brandeis University. In 1974, West earned a Juris Doctor from Indiana University Maurer School of Law.

== Career ==
West clerked for Judge Jesse E. Eschbach. In 1974, West joined Ice Miller in Indianapolis and practiced labor and employment law.

In Fall 1982, West began her teaching career in law at UC Davis School of Law. West emphasized in Employment Discrimination, Labor Law, and Sex based Discrimination. West served as Associate Dean of the law school between 1988 and 1992.

From 1997 through 2005, West served on the Davis Joint Unified School District Board of Education, over which she presided in 2001 and 2004.

In 1998, West created the Family Protection and Legal Assistance Clinic at UC Davis Law School, for which she received California's first federal grant under the Violence Against Women Act. According to the Association of American Law Schools, "The clinic's initial funding came in the form of a federal Violence Against Women Act grant awarded to only one such program per state for the purpose of strengthening civil legal assistance for victims of domestic violence." She also worked to obtain childcare on campus. Finally, in 1989, UCD provided $75,000 for a graduate student lottery to fund childcare for graduate students.

After the passage in 1996 of California's anti-affirmative-action Proposition 209, West became concerned that the University of California system was hiring fewer women faculty. Due to her initiative, the California Legislature held hearings on this matter in 2001, 2002, and 2003.

In 2005, West was lead author of the report, (based in part on those legislative hearings) "Unprecedented Urgency: Gender Discrimination in Faculty Hiring at the University of California." The New York Times described the report as follows:

- A new report by four professors at the University of California at Davis has found that despite an unusual hiring wave and a steady increase in the number of women in the Ph.D. applicant pool, the University of California still lags in hiring women...Martha West, the lead author of the new report, who has worked on the issue for years, said that as the number of women earning Ph.D.'s increased, the rate of female faculty hiring should be growing much faster than currently.

The report noted that UC faculty hiring of women had fallen below levels from the mid-nineties, even though women were receiving a larger percentage of PhDs awarded: "In the 1995-96 academic year, women were 36 percent of UC's hires, but in the 1999-2000 academic year, after the passage of Prop. 209, 25 percent of faculty hires were women."

In 2006, the American Association of University Professors (AAUP) released its own, broader, report on gender equity in faculty hiring at more than a thousand American colleges and universities. West co-authored the report's first section, "Organizing around Gender Equity."

Having retired from full-time teaching in 2007, in 2008 West became the AAUP's General Counsel, a two-year position leading AAUP's legal staff. West had previously had other roles at AAUP, including chairing AAUP's Legal Defense Fund (1998–2002), chairing a subcommittee that drafted the AAUP's Statement of Principles on Family Responsibilities and Academic Work (2001), and serving as a member of their Committee A on Academic Freedom and Tenure (2002–05).

Among the legal issues the AAUP addressed during West's tenure was the Attorney General of Virginia's climate science investigation, which the AAUP described as a "threat to academic freedom." West (on behalf of the AAUP), together with the American Civil Liberties Union of Virginia, wrote a letter offering legal advice and assistance:

It is the University's obligation to protect academic freedom by seeing that legal tools such as the CID are not used to intimidate scientists whose methods or tools are controversial. We therefore urge you to take advantage of Virginia Code § 8.01-216.18(B), under which the university may petition the circuit court to modify or set aside the CID. We stand ready to assist if we may be of use to the University in this process.

The University of Virginia, which had originally planned to comply with the request for documents, instead retained legal counsel. In 2012, the Supreme Court of Virginia upheld UV's contention that the Attorney General had no legal authority to demand the records in this case.

== Awards ==
- 1990 Ruth E. Anderson Award (awarded annually by the UC Davis Women's Center for advocacy on behalf of women on campus and in the city of Davis).
- 1991 named "Outstanding Woman of the Year in Education" by the Sacramento YWCA.
- 1997 UCDSL Distinguished Teaching Award.
- 2000 Frances Newell Carr Award (from Women Lawyers of Sacramento).
- 2002 California NOW Award for outstanding women in education.
- 2011 Indiana University School of Law's Academy of Law Alumni Fellows.
