= Wesley John Perschbacher =

American author and professor

Wesley John Perschbacher was an author and professor at Moody Bible Institute in Chicago, Illinois where he retired. The son of Garfield Clayton Perschbacher and Rienskje Basstra, Wesley was born August 20, 1932, in Grand Rapids, Michigan. He was a graduate of Grand Rapids School of Bible and Music, Calvin College, and Trinity Evangelical Divinity School. He died July 31, 2012, in Bloomington, Indiana.

== Works ==
- Refresh Your Greek, 1989 ISBN 978-0802433527
- The New Analytical Greek Lexicon, 1990 ISBN 978-0943575339
- New Testament Greek Exegesis, 1992 ASIN B0006F1XRI
- Refresh Your Greek Practical Helps for Reading the New Testament, 1994 ASIN B000M8IV0G
- New Testament Greek Syntax: An Illustrated Manual, 1995 ISBN 978-0802460448
- Word Pictures of the New Testament Vol. 1, 2003 ISBN 978-0825436406
- Word Pictures of the New Testament Vol. 2, 2005 ISBN 978-0825436413
