= William B. Lacy (sociologist) =

American sociologist

- Education: Cornell University; Colgate University; University of Michigan
- Scientific career
- Fields: Sociology of Science, Agricultural Research, Extension Systems, science policy, Biotechnology, Biodiversity, and The Democratization of Food Systems.
- Workplaces: University of California, Davis; Cornell University; Pennsylvania State University; University of Kentucky; Colgate University

William B. Lacy is an American sociologist and academic administrator whose research focuses on science policy, agricultural research and extension, biotechnology, and biodiversity. He is Professor Emeritus of Human Ecology and Vice Provost Emeritus for University Outreach and International Programs at the University of California, Davis.

He is a Fellow of the American Association for the Advancement of Science and former president of Rural Sociological Society, the Agriculture, Food and Human Values Association and the Association of International Education Administrators.

== Education ==
Lacy earned a Bachelor of Science degree in the School of Industrial and Labor Relations from Cornell University in 1964. He went on to receive a master's degree in higher education administration from Colgate University in 1965. He later earned a second master's degree in sociology and social psychology in 1971 and a Ph.D. in the same field in 1975, both from the University of Michigan.

== Career ==
Before joining UC Davis, Lacy held senior academic and administrative positions at Cornell University, Pennsylvania State University, the University of Kentucky and Colgate University.

From 1994 to 1998, he served as Director of Cornell Cooperative Extension and Associate Dean in both the College of Agriculture and Life Sciences and the College of Human Ecology.

He was previously Assistant Dean for Research at Penn State's College of Agricultural Sciences from 1989 to 1994.

At the University of Kentucky, he directed the Food, Environment, Agriculture, and Society in Transition (FEAST) Program also served as the Academic Ombudsman . He also was the Director of Upper-class Housing on the Dean of Students staff at Colgate University from 1967 to 1969.

In 1999, Lacy was appointed as the inaugural Vice Provost for University Outreach and International Programs (UOIP) at the University of California, Davis. He held the position until July 2014, after which he continued as a professor of sociology in the Department of Human Ecology. Lacy played a key role in establishing the New Initiatives/Seed Grant Program, which distributed over $1.5 million in internal funding and leveraged more than $30 million in external grants.

He also oversaw the UC Davis Education Abroad Center and championed programs that significantly increased student participation in international education. He chaired and founded the University of California Senior International Leader's Council (2002-2005).

He served as Interim Chair of the Department of Human Ecology from 2017 to 2019 and retired from the university in 2021.

Lacy served as president of several professional organizations, including the Rural Sociological Society from 1998 to 1999, the Agriculture, Food, and Human Values Society (1993), and the Association of International Education Administrators (2010–2011).

He participated in a number of national commissions and committees, among them the Commission on International Initiatives of the Association of Public and Land-Grant Universities, the Commission for Internationalization and Global Engagement of the American Council on Education, and the Budget Committee of the Extension Committee on Organization and Policy of the National Association of State Universities and Land-Grant Colleges, which he chaired from 1996 to 1998.

He also chaired the Legislative Subcommittee of the Experiment Station Committee on Organization and Policy of the National Association of State Universities from 1992 to 1993.

== Awards and honors ==
He is a Fellow of the American Association for the Advancement of Science (AAAS) and the recipient of two Fulbright administrative awards, which enabled international research visits to Brazil in 2001 and Japan in 2010.

He also received a 2004 award from the German Academic Exchange Service (DAAD) and the Senator Paul Simon Spotlight Award in 2009 for his work advancing academic partnerships in Cuba and Iran.

In 2021, he received The Richard B Haynes Distinguished Lifetime Achievement Award in Sustainable Agriculture, Agriculture and Human Values.

He is also received The Fred Buttel Outstanding Scholarly Achievement Award, Rural Sociological Society in 2013. He received the annual Award for Excellence in Research from Rural Sociological Society in 1990. In 2014, he received The Timothy J. Rutenber Award in recognition of outstanding and dedicated service from Association of International Education Administrators.

== Research ==
Lacy’s research spans over four decades, focusing on the sociology of science, agricultural research and extension systems, science policy, biotechnology, biodiversity, and the democratization of food systems.

His early work explored the organization of agricultural scientific enterprises, including their transition under pressures of globalization and commercialization.

A prominent area of his scholarship addresses the implications of biotechnology in agriculture, including issues related to academic capitalism, ethical considerations, and power asymmetries in knowledge production.

His publications have examined how large agribusiness corporations influence scientific agendas and policy, often marginalizing public interest concerns.

In his more recent work, Lacy has turned attention to local food systems, food sovereignty, and the role of citizen and public science in achieving equitable and sustainable food futures.

He argues that centralized, industrial food systems are inefficient, environmentally damaging, and socially inequitable. Instead he promotes the revitalization of community-based food systems that prioritize local control, democratic participation, and ecological stewardship.

His research has been cited in interdisciplinary fields, and he has authored or co-authored more than eighty journal articles and book chapters, as well as several books, including Science, Agriculture and the Politics of Research and Plants, Power and Profit.

His article, "Local Food Systems, Citizen and Public Science, Empowered Communities, and Democracy" (2023), provides a comprehensive review of the challenges and opportunities facing global food systems, serving as a call for systemic transformation through inclusive science and policy.

Lacy's work has been supported by major institutions, including the U.S. Department of Agriculture, the National Science Foundation, the U.S. Agency for International Development, the Ford Foundation, the W.K. Kellogg Foundation, and the University of California.

== Selected publications ==
=== Books and Journals ===
- Busch, L.M; Lacy, W.B (20 June 2019) [1983]. Science, Agriculture, And The Politics Of Research (1st ed.). Routledge. p. 303. doi:10.4324/9780429305467. ISBN 978-0367302177.
- Busch, L.M; Lacy, W.B (1984). Food Security In The United States (1st ed.). CRC Press. p. 430.
- Lacy, William B.; Bokemeier, Janet L.; Shepard, Jon M. (1983). "Job Attribute Preferences and Work Commitment of Men and Women in the United States". Personnel Psychology. 36 (2): 315–329. doi:10.1111/j.1744-6570.1983.tb01440.x. ISSN 1744-6570.
- Lacy, William B. (1978). "Interpersonal Relationships as Mediators of Structural Effects: College Student Socialization in a Traditional and an Experimental University Environment". Sociology of Education. 51 (3): 201–211. doi:10.2307/2112665. ISSN 0038-0407. JSTOR 2112665.
- Busch, L.M.; Lacy, W. B.; Burkhardt, J; Lacy, LR (1992). Plants, power and profit: social, economic, and ethical consequences of the new biotechnologies (1. publ. in paperback ed.). Cambridge, Mass.: Basil Blackwell. ISBN 978-1-55786-379-9.
- Making nature, shaping culture: plant biodiversity in global context. Our sustainable future. Lincoln: University of Nebraska Press. 1995. ISBN 978-0-8032-1256-5.
- Lacy, William B. (1994). "Biodiversity, cultural diversity, and food equity". Agriculture and Human Values. 11 (1): 3–9. doi:10.1007/bf01534442. ISSN 0889-048X.
- Lacy, William B. (2000). "Empowering Communities Through Public Work, Science, and Local Food Systems: Revisiting Democracy and Globalization*". Rural Sociology. 65 (1): 3–26. doi:10.1111/j.1549-0831.2000.tb00340.x. ISSN 0036-0112.
- Lacy, W. B.; Hendricks, J. (1980). "Developmental models of adult life: myth or reality". International Journal of Aging & Human Development. 11 (2): 89–110. doi:10.2190/10M5-W7QX-L6HD-MT8V. ISSN 0091-4150. PMID 7203660.
- Glenna, Leland L.; Lacy, William B.; Welsh, Rick; Biscotti, Dina (2007). "University Administrators, Agricultural Biotechnology, and Academic Capitalism: Defining the Public Good to Promote University–Industry Relationships". The Sociological Quarterly. 48 (1): 141–163. doi:10.1111/j.1533-8525.2007.00074.x. ISSN 0038-0253.
- Lacy, William (2022-11-30). "Local food systems, citizen and public science, empowered communities, and democracy: hopes deserving to live". Agriculture and Human Values. 40 (1): 1–17. doi:10.1007/s10460-022-10398-z. ISSN 0889-048X.
- Lacy, William B.; Croucher, Gwilym; Brett, André; Mueller, Romina (2017-06-06). "Australian Universities at a Crossroads". UC Berkeley: Center for Studies in Higher Education.
- Lacy, William B. (1981). "The Influence of Attitudes and Current Friends on Drug Use Intentions". The Journal of Social Psychology. 113 (1): 65–76. doi:10.1080/00224545.1981.9924350. ISSN 0022-4545. PMID 7218785.
