= Yu-Jui Yvonne Wan =

Woman liver researcher

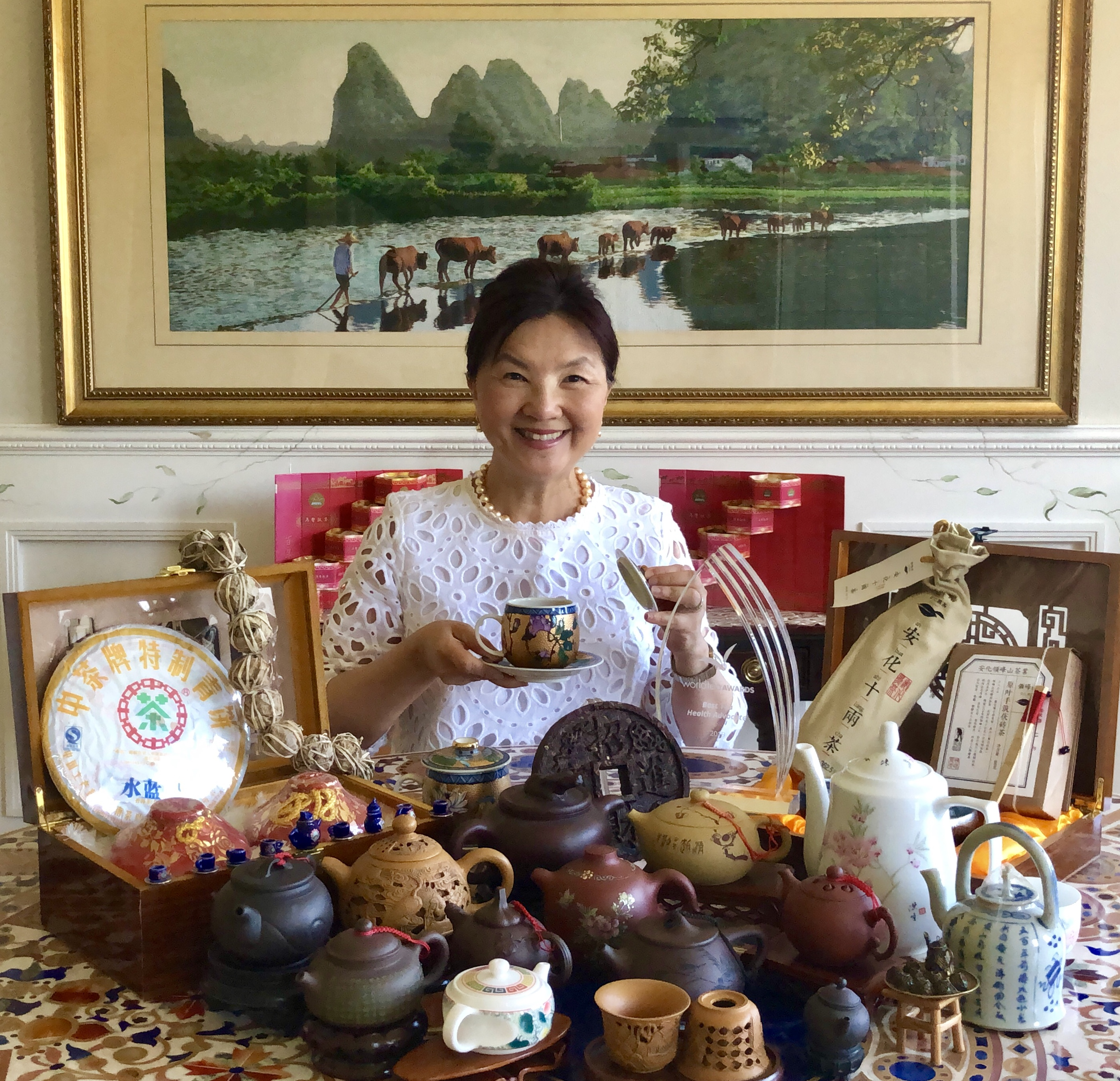
- Wan in 2019
- Born: Taipei, Taiwan
- Education: Taipei Medical University (BS); Drexel University (MS, PhD)
- Occupation: Distinguished professor
- Employer(s): University of California, Davis
- Known for: Nuclear receptor, retinoic acid, liver diseases, diet, and gut liver-axis

Yu-Jui Yvonne Wan is a Taiwanese biomedical scientist researching the diet-gut-liver-brain axis and development of disease. She had led the Liver Center at University of Kansas Medical Center and Department of Pathology at UC Davis.

== Early life and education ==
Wan was raised in Taipei. She attended the grade school named the National Taipei University of Education Experimental Elementary School and was awarded as an Outstanding Alumnus of that School. She continued her studies in the Taipei Municipal Jinhua Junior High School, followed by attending the Taipei Municipal Zhong Shan Girls High School. She then received her Bachelor of Science with honors from Taipei Medical University, School of Pharmacy in 1979. Wan was elected as the Outstanding Alumnus of TMU due to her academic achievements. After graduating from TMU, she continued to advance her education at Drexel University. She received a Master of Science degree in two years and a Ph.D. degree from the Drexel University two years later.

== Career ==
Wan started her independent scientific career in 1989 as a faculty member in the Department of Pathology at the University of California, Los Angeles (UCLA). She established her laboratory at Harbor UCLA, where she studied the roles of retinoic acid and nuclear receptors in liver health and disease development, funded by the NIH. She also performed clinical research for longer than a decade to understand the drinking issues related to gene polymorphisms in ethnic minority populations funded by the NIH. She rose from assistant to associate and then professor at UCLA before relocating to University of Kansas Medical Center in 2003.

In 2003, Wan served as a Professor for the Department of Pharmacology, Toxicology and Therapeutics at the University of Kansas Medical Center in Kansas City, Kansas. Wan was the director of the Liber Center and the Leader of the Cancer Biology Program starting in 2007. As the Founding Director of the Liver Center, she helped establish a human liver specimen bank containing over 800 specimens. She aided in obtaining a multi-million-dollar NIH Centers of Biomedical Research Excellence (COBRE) funding, which benefited many liver researchers in the Midwest, and enabled junior faculty to start their research laboratories and programs.

In 2012, Wan relocated to the University of California, Davis in Sacramento, California, with her appointment as Professor and Vice Chair of Research in the Department of Pathology and Laboratory Medicine. She became the 129th woman professor recruited to UC Davis. Her current research focus is the diet-gut-liver axis, which affects the development of metabolic dysfunction-associated steatohepatitis (MASH) and Hepatocellular carcinoma (HCC). She also studies the dietary effects via the gut microbiome influencing neuroplasticity and skin health, i.e., the diet-gut-brain or skin axis. Wan researched racial and ethnic disparities in metabolic dysfunction and Alzheimer disease through a million dollar grant from California Department of Public Health.

As the Vice Chair of Research for the Department of Pathology and Laboratory Medicine, she has contributed to increasing the department's research ranking at the national level by 25 positions since her induction as vice-chair in 2012.

In 2022, Wan was advanced to the University of California Distinguished Professor, the highest campus-level faculty title that can be bestowed.

== Awards and honors ==
In 2003, Wan was recognized as a Distinguished Women in Research for years of dedicated service to advancing medical research, presented by California Congresswoman Jane Harman. Between 2007 and 2010, she received the Joy McCann Professorship in recognition of contributions to biomedical research and mentoring programs. In 2009, she was recognized as the Women in Toxicology SIG Elsevier Mentoring Award from the Society of Toxicology for outstanding mentorship. In 2010, she received the Chancellor's Club Research Award at the University of Kansas. In 2019, Wan was awarded the Best Tea Health Advocate at the World Tea Expo for her lab's innovative work uncovering the beneficial effects of epigallocatechin-3-gallate present in tea. In 2020, Wan was honored with the Dean's Award of Excellence from the University of California, Davis due in part to her lab's contribution to producing novel nano drugs for liver treatment and prevention.
