= Rachel Whitmer =

Epidemiologist

Rachel A. Whitmer
- Education: University of Massachusetts Amherst; University of California Davis
- Known for: Alzheimer's and dementia research
- Scientific career
- Fields: Epidemiology
- Workplaces: Kaiser Permanente

Rachel A. Whitmer is an epidemiologist at the University of California, Davis. Whitmer is a professor in the UC Davis Department of Public Health Sciences and chief of the UC Davis Division of Epidemiology. She also works with Kaiser Permanente. Whitmer received her undergraduate degree from the University of Massachusetts Amherst, and her PhD from UC Davis.

Whitmer's research centers on the differing effects of dementia upon racial groups and age cohorts. Whitmer's findings have included a correlation between a woman's reproductive history and her chance of developing dementia. Another study led by Whitmer suggested a correlation between racism-related stress in African-American women and a higher risk of developing dementia. She is a primary investigator in the ongoing U.S. POINTER trial study of Alzheimer's led by the Alzheimer's Association.
