= Emil Seckel =

German jurist (1864–1924)

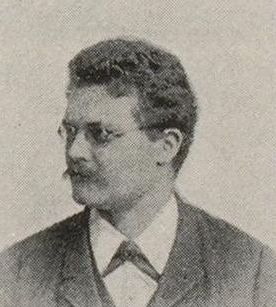
Portrait photo of Emil Seckel

Emil Seckel (10 January 1864, Neuenheim near Heidelberg – 26 April 1924, Todtmoos) was a German jurist and law historian.

Emil Seckel studied law at the University of Tübingen. Seckel professor in 1898. In 1901 Seckel took over the professorship for Roman law at the University of Berlin. On December 7, 1911, he became a member of the Prussian Academy of Sciences. In 1920, Seckel was appointed rector of the Humboldt University in Berlin as the successor to the historian Eduard Meyer. The chemist Walther Nernst succeeded him in 1921.

Seckel's main areas of research were jurisprudence and especially Roman law. The edition of the collection of the capitularies of Benedictus Levita was one of his central fields of work. The central management of the Monumenta Germaniae Historica assigned him the task of preparing the publication of a new edition in 1896 after the editor responsible Victor Krause suddenly died at the age of 31. Before his death Seckel had published more than a thousand pages of research on the sources, but was unable to present a new edition of Benedictus Levita.

His sons included the pediatrician Helmut Paul George Seckel (1900-1960), for whom the Seckel syndrome is named, and the art historian Dietrich Seckel.

== Literary works ==
- Beiträge zur Geschichte beider Rechte Mittelalter, 1898
- Gestaltungsrechte des bürgerlichen Rechts, 1903
