= Edgar Bodenheimer =

German American author & law professor (1908-1991)

- Born: March 14, 1908; Berlin, Prussia
- Died: May 30, 1991 (aged 83); Davis, California, US
- Education: Heidelberg University
- Occupation: Lawyer
- Spouse: Brigitte Levy (m. 1935; died 1981)

Edgar Bodenheimer (March 14, 1908 – May 30, 1991) was a German American author and professor of law in the United States.

== Biography ==
Bodenheimer was born in Berlin in 1908. He was educated at the University of Geneva, the Ludwig-Maximilians-Universität München, Heidelberg University, and the Friedrich Wilhelm University of Berlin. After receiving his J.U.D. from Heidelberg University in 1933, he immigrated to the United States to escape from the Nazis. Without an American legal degree, he began working for the firm of Rosenberg, Goldmark & Colin. He later got his LL.B. from the University of Washington in 1937.

His career started in 1940 as an Attorney for the U.S. Department of Labor, where he worked for two years before taking on the Principal Attorney position at the Office of Alien Property Custodian in Washington D.C.

In 1945, Edgar served in the Allies' "Office of Chief of Counsel for prosecution of Axis Criminality", OCCPAC, at the Nuremberg Trials, utilizing his degrees in both American and German law.

He joined the law faculty of the University of Utah in 1946, and became a professor at the Law School of University of California, Davis in 1966. Retiring in 1975, he continued writing and lecturing at UC Davis as Professor Emeritus until his death in 1991.

Works by Edgar Bodenheimer have been translated into Spanish, Portuguese, and Chinese.

A biography of Bodenheimer and his wife, Brigitte Levy Bodenheimer, Edgar and Brigitte: A German Jewish Passage to America, by their daughter Rosemarie Bodenheimer, was published in 2016.

== Selected works ==
- Jurisprudence, McGraw-Hill 1940
- Jurisprudence: The Philosophy and Method of the Law, Harvard University Press 1962.
- Jurisprudence: The Philosophy and Method of the Law (revised edition), Harvard University Press 1974.
- Treatise on Justice, Philosophical Library 1967.
- Power, Law, And Society; A Study of the Will to Power and the Will to Law, Crane, Russak 1972.
- Philosophy of Responsibility, Fred Rothman 1980.
