= Edward Imwinkelried =

American legal academic

Edward J. Imwinkelried
- Born: Edward John Imwinkelried; September 19, 1945 (age 81); San Francisco County, California, U.S.
- Education: University of San Francisco (BA, JD); The Judge Advocate General's Legal Center and School
- Employer(s): United States Army; University of San Diego; Washington University in St. Louis; University of California, Davis
- Military service
- Branch: United States Army
- Service years: 1970–1974
- Rank: Captain
- Unit: J.A.G. Corps
- Conflicts: Vietnam War

Edward John Imwinkelried (born September 19, 1945) is an American educator and law scholar. the Edward L. Barrett, Jr. Professor of Law Emeritus at the UC Davis School of Law (King Hall). Imwinkelried is the most cited legal academic in the country in the area of Evidence law. His book, Scientific Evidence, was cited twice by the U.S. Supreme Court in the ground-breaking evidence case, Daubert v. Merrell Dow Pharmaceuticals.

== Education ==
He received a B.A. (magna cum laude) in Political Science from the University of San Francisco in 1967 and a J.D. (magna cum laude) from the University of San Francisco School of Law in 1969.

== Military service ==
He graduated from The JAG School at the University of Virginia in June 1970 and commissioned an officer in the United States Army. From June 1970 to June 1971, he served as a Post Judge Advocate at the Rocky Mountain Arsenal in Denver, Colorado. He also served as a prosecuting attorney before United States Magistrate courts and as defense counsel in courts-martial. From August 1971 to 1972, he served as an Assistant Staff Judge Advocate for XXIV Corps and the 196th Light Infantry Brigade in Vietnam. He also served as a claims officer and summary court-martial officer. From July 1972 to June 1974, he served as an Instructor for the Criminal Law Division of the Judge Advocate General's School in Charlottesville, Virginia. He left the service in 1974 as a Captain.

== Academic career ==
From August 1974 to June 1979, he served as Professor of Law at University of San Diego School of Law teaching evidence, trial techniques, moot court, contracts, and legal writing. From January to May 1981, he was a visiting Professor of Law at the University of Illinois teaching legal profession. In the summer of 1981, he was a Professor of Law for the University of San Diego's program in Guadalajara, Mexico where he instructed Comparative Mexican-American Contract Law. From July 1979 to June 1985, he was a Professor of Law at Washington University School of Law, where he instructed evidence, trial techniques, scientific evidence, legal Ethics, and contracts.

In 1997, he was a visiting Professor of Law at the University of Houston in Houston, Texas. In 2003, he was a visiting Professor of Law at the University College Dublin in Dublin, Ireland.

In 2006, he was a visiting Professor of Law at Ohio State University Moritz College of Law in Columbus, Ohio.

From 1985 to 2013, he was a Edward L. Barrett, Jr. Professor of Law at UC Davis School of Law.

Since 2013, he has been Edward L. Barrett, Jr. Professor of Law Emeritus at UC Davis School of Law.
