= UC Davis Graduate School of Management =

Business school of UC Davis

Coordinates: 38.5406°N 121.7467°W

- Motto: Preparing Innovative Leaders for Global Impact
- Type: Public business school
- Established: 1981
- Dean: H. Rao Unnava
- Faculty: 38 tenured and tenure-track
- Postgraduates: 500 graduate business students
- Location: Davis, California, United States
- Alumni: 4,600
- Nickname: UC Davis GSM
- Website: gsm.ucdavis.edu
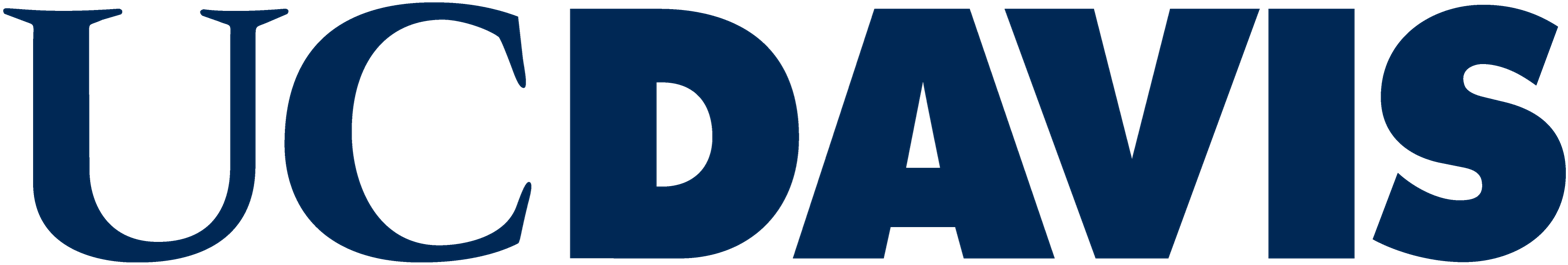

The UC Davis Graduate School of Management (GSM) is a graduate business school at the University of California, Davis. Established in 1981, its degree programs include Master of Business Administration (MBA), Master of Professional Accountancy (MPAc) and Master of Science in Business Analytics (MSBA). In addition to the full-time MBA program at the main campus in Davis, the school also has an online MBA program and programs for working professionals at satellite campuses in Sacramento and San Ramon.

The school's LEED Platinum certified facility, Maurice J. Gallagher, Jr. Hall, opened in September 2009.

The Dean of the Graduate School of Management, H. Rao Unnava, stepped down on July 1, 2026. Tom Smith, the Dean of the UC Davis School of Education, was appointed interim dean.

== Academics ==
UC Davis undergraduates can minor in technology management or accounting. GSM's executive programs include the Wine Executive program, jointly managed with the Department of Viticulture & Enology.

The school's teaching model combines case study, experiential learning, lecture and team projects.

=== Master of Business Administration ===
The in-person working professional programs are designed to be completed in three years, but may be "accelerated" to finish in two by taking additional classes. The MBA degree requires completing 72 hours of credit (24 courses) with a cumulative grade point average of 3.0 or better. MBA students at UC Davis may also seek to earn a joint degree such as a J.D./M.B.A., MBA/Doctor of Medicine (MD), MBA/Master of Science in Engineering (MSE), and MBA/Master of Science (MS) in Agricultural and Resource Economics.

MBA concentrations offered include: Accounting; Competitive Analytics and Technologies; Finance; Information Technology; General Management; Marketing; Technology Management; and Entrepreneurship. MBA specializations are offered in Agribusiness; Biotechnology; Corporate and Social Responsibility; Healthcare; High Tech; International Business; Non-Profit; Real Estate; Small Business; and Wine Industry.

The MBA curriculum is anchored by IMPACT, a new, two-part capstone course designed to sharpen writing, speaking and critical-thinking abilities. IMPACT teams work on 10-week projects for clients ranging from multinational Fortune 500 firms to ultra-fast-paced Silicon Valley start-ups.

GSM has an online MBA program with the same standards and credit hours, and also offers working professional MBA programs in Sacramento and San Ramon in addition to the two-year, full-time MBA program at the main campus in Davis.

=== Master of Professional Accountancy ===
In 2012 UC Davis became the first University of California school to offer a master's degree in professional accountancy. The MPAc program requires students to pass an examination after advancing to candidacy, and at the end of all coursework, in order to receive the degree.

=== Master of Science in Business Analytics ===
In fall 2017, the school launched a master's degree in Business Analytics at its UC Hastings extension campus in San Francisco.

== Research centers ==
- Institute for Innovation and Entrepreneurship - Under the direction of Professor Andrew Hargadon.
- Center for Investor Welfare and Corporate Responsibility - Under the direction of Professor Brad M. Barber, engaged in research related to investor welfare, corporate fraud, white-collar crime, corporate ethics and social responsibility. The Center advocates for improved corporate practices, educates investors through research and outreach.

== Student life ==
- Associated Students of Management (ASM) provides the framework for incorporating student ideas into the MBA program, networking with alumni, engaging in philanthropic activities, and coordinating extracurricular and social events.
- Big Bang! is the annual UC Davis Business Plan Competition organized by MBA students. The competition promotes new business development, technology transfer and entrepreneurship on campus and in Northern California. Over 20 thousand dollars are awarded to the winners of the competition each year.
- MBA Challenge for Charity (C4C) supports the Special Olympics and family-related local charities.
- Net Impact offers programs to help its members broaden their business education, refine leadership skills, pursue professional goals and build their network.
- Various intramural sports teams that compete against other teams on campus in recreational sports such as flag football, soccer, basketball, and inner tube water polo.

== Rankings ==
Business school rankings

U.S. MBA Rankings
- Bloomberg (2025): 43
- U.S. News & World Report (2026): 55

== See also ==
- List of United States business school rankings
- List of business schools in the United States
- Informs: Analytics and OR/MS Education
