= John D. Owens =

American electrical engineer

- Education: University of California, Berkeley, BS (1995); Stanford University, PhD (2003)
- Scientific career
- Fields: Electrical engineering
- Workplaces: University of California, Davis
- Thesis: Computer Graphics on a Stream Architecture (2003)
- Doctoral advisor: William J. Dally and Pat Hanrahan

John D. Owens is an American computer engineer, known for his work in GPU computing. He is Child Family Professor of Engineering and Entrepreneurship in the Department of Electrical and Computer Engineering at University of California, Davis.

== Education ==
John Owens received his Ph.D. in electrical engineering in 2003 from Stanford University under the supervision of William J. Dally and Pat Hanrahan.

== Awards and honors ==
Owens was elected to the Class of 2021 IEEE Fellows "for contributions to heterogeneous parallel computing". He was elected an AAAS Fellow in 2020 "for fundamental contributions to commodity parallel computing, particularly in the development of GPU algorithms, data structures, and applications."

In 2007, his paper "Scan Primitives for GPU Computing" won the Best paper award at Graphics Hardware.

== Selected publications ==
- Owens, John D.; Luebke, David; Govindaraju, Naga; Harris, Mark; Krüger, Jens; Legohn, Aaron; Purcell, Timothy (March 2007), "A Survey of General‐Purpose Computation on Graphics Hardware" (PDF), Computer Graphics Forum, 25 (1): 80–113.
- Owens, John D.; Houston, Mike; Luebke, David; Green, Simon; Stone, John E.; Phillips, James C. (2008-05-01), GPU Computing (PDF), IEEE Computer Society, pp. 879–899.
- Rixner, Scoot; Dally, William J.; Kapasi, Ujval; Mattson, Peter; Owens, John D. (2000), "Memory Access Scheduling" (PDF), Proceedings of the 27th International Symposium on Computer Architecture: 126–138.
