= Kevin Johnson (lawyer) =

American law professor

Kevin R. Johnson
- Born: United States

Academic background
- Education: University of California, Berkeley (BA); Harvard University (JD)

Academic work
- Discipline: Immigration law, Criminal procedure, Critical race theory, Refugee law
- Institutions: University of California, Davis School of Law

Kevin R. Johnson is a professor and former Dean at the UC Davis School of Law (King Hall). Before becoming a professor, he was a student at Harvard Law School, where he served as an editor of the Harvard Law Review, served as a clerk to Judge Stephen Reinhardt of the United States Court of Appeals for the Ninth Circuit, and worked for law firm Heller Ehrman White & McAuliffe. Johnson joined the faculty at the UC Davis School of Law (King Hall) in 1989, was named Associate Dean in 1998, and the Dean from 2008 to 2024. Of Mexican American ancestry, he is the first Latino to head a law school in the UC system.

Dean Johnson is a scholar in civil rights, chicano/a studies, and immigration law. He serves on the board of the Mexican American Legal Defense and Education Fund, and as the president of the board of directors of Legal Services of Northern California. Johnson was a senior immigration advisor to President Barack Obama during his presidential candidacy, and contributes to the influence immigration law blog, ImmigrationProf

He received a B.A. in Economics from the University of California, Berkeley and a J.D., magna cum laude, from Harvard Law School.

== Selected publications ==
- Johnson, Kevin R. (2002). "The End of "Civil Rights" as We Know It?: Immigration and Civil Rights in the New Millennium". UCLA L. Rev. 49 (5): 1481–1511.
- Johnson, Kevin R. (2017). "Immigration and civil rights in the Trump administration: Law and policy making by executive order". Santa Clara Law Review. 57 (3): 611–665.
- Johnson, Kevin R.; Cuison-Villazor, Rose (May 2, 2019). "The Trump Administration and the War on Immigration Diversity". Wake Forest Law Review. 54 (2): 575–616.
