= Georgetown Journal of International Law =

- Discipline: International law
- Language: English
- Edited by: David Cervantes

Publication details
- Former names: Georgetown Journal of Law and Policy in International Business
- History: 1968-present
- Publisher: Georgetown University Law Center (United States)
- Frequency: Quarterly

Standard abbreviations
- Bluebook: Geo. J. Int'l L.
- ISO 4: Georget. J. Int. Law

Indexing
- ISSN: 1550-5200
- LCCN: 2004250066
- OCLC no.: 55022895

Links
- Journal homepage; Online archive

The Georgetown Journal of International Law is a law review published by Georgetown University Law Center. It is among the world's most influential international law journals.

== Overview ==
The Georgetown Journal of International Law (GJIL) is one of the nation's top resources for scholars and practitioners in the field of international law.

The journal was established in 1968 as the Georgetown Journal of Law and Policy in International Business. Nowadays, The Georgetown Journal of International Law publishes on a variety of topics, such as human rights, international humanitarian law, international security, trade, investment, business, taxation, international criminal law, and intellectual property; it also sponsors a bi-annual symposium.

GJIL publishes four issues per year, including one special issue typically covering developments in international trade law.

== Membership ==
Today, GJIL employs approximately 100 second- and third-year law students—about 50 in their graduating year who serve in editorial positions and 50 in intermediate years who serve as staff. The staff collect and check sources, performing technical edits and checking for typographical errors. The upperclass students are tasked with administering the Journal's daily operations.

In order to gain journal membership, first-year students are permitted to participate in the Write On competition after completing their final exams in the spring semester. The competition is administered by the Georgetown Law Office of Journal Administration.

Students are offered positions on GJIL based on a combination of Write On score, first-year grades, and optional personal statements.
