= Miguel Méndez (legal scholar) =

American professor (c.1943–2017)

Miguel A. Méndez
- Méndez in the 1970s
- Born: c. 1943
- Died: May 25, 2017 (aged 74)
- Education: George Washington University (AB); George Washington University Law School (JD)
- Scientific career
- Fields: Evidence, criminal law, criminal procedure
- Institutions: University of California, Davis School of Law

Miguel A. Méndez (c. 1943 – May 25, 2017) was a professor of law at the University of California, Davis, School of Law (King Hall). Before joining the Davis faculty, he was the Adelbert H. Sweet Professor of Law at Stanford University Law School, where he was on the law faculty from 1977 to 2009. Before starting his teaching career, he was a legislative assistant to U.S. Senator Alan Cranston (D-CA), staff attorney with the Mexican American Legal Defense and Education Fund, deputy director of California Rural Legal Assistance and attorney with the Office of the Public Defender of Monterey County.

He received an A.B. in international affairs and Latin American studies from George Washington University in 1965 and a J.D. from George Washington University Law School in 1968. Méndez died on May 25, 2017, at his home in San Carlos. He was survived by two daughters, Arabela and Gabriela.
