= Rex R. Perschbacher =

American academic

Rex R. Perschbacher (c. 1946 – 2018) was the Daniel J. Dykstra Endowed Chair at UC Davis School of Law, where he presided as Dean from 1998 to 2008. In addition to his impressive career as a legal scholar, he was credited with leading "an intellectual renaissance" at the Law School and with spearheading the King Hall Expansion and Renovation, a $30 million effort to upgrade the Law School's Martin Luther King Jr. Hall.

Perschbacher taught at UC Davis from 1981 until 2016, with an emphasis on the areas of Civil Procedure, Professional Responsibility, and Clinical teaching. He received the law school's Distinguished Teaching Award in 1992, and a Special Citation Affirmative Action and Diversity Achievement Award in 2001.

He received an A.B. in philosophy from Stanford University in 1968 and a J.D. from UC Berkeley School of Law in 1972, where he was Articles Editor for the California Law Review and elected to the Order of the Coif. Perschbacher served as law clerk to Alfonso J. Zirpoli of the United States District Court for the Northern District of California. He entered private practice with Heller, Ehrman, White & McAuliffe in San Francisco before teaching at UC Berkeley, the University of Texas, Santa Clara University, and the University of San Diego law schools. He published articles in the areas of civil procedure, professional responsibility and lawyers' negotiations, and was co-author of United States Legal System: An Introduction (1st and 2d eds.); Cases and Materials on Civil Procedure (1-5th eds.); California Civil Procedure; California Legal Ethics (1-6th eds.) and Problems in Legal Ethics (3-8th eds.). He served on the board of directors of the Legal Services of Northern California and on the Governing Committee on Continuing Education of the Bar from 2000 to 2003.
