= The Cochran Firm =

US law firm

The Cochran Firm is a law firm in the United States founded in 1968 by Johnnie Cochran in Los Angeles.

== History ==
In 1997, Cochran partnered with Samuel A. Cherry Jr., Keith Givens, and Jock M. Smith. The partnership of Cochran Cherry Givens and Smith provided the framework which launched The Cochran Firm. With the first offices located in Los Angeles and New York, The Cochran Firm expanded into a national law firm with regional offices across the U.S., giving the firm the ability to represent clients in multiple states.

In 2007, the firm was ranked as the 141st largest law firm in the United States on the National Law Journal 250 with nearly 3,000 attorneys. The Cochran Firm primarily does civil plaintiff and criminal defense work. The firm has been named to the National Law Journal Plaintiff's Hot List which compiles the United States' top plaintiffs' firms.

In 2020, the firm had 33 offices in 15 states.

== Civil practice ==
The firm maintains a civil law division representing plaintiffs who have suffered a personal injury due to the negligence or wrongful conduct of others. The firm handles products liability, medical malpractice, mass torts, pharmaceutical litigation, and premises liability. The Cochran Firm has received verdicts and settlements totaling over $45 billion. The partners of the firm have won 11 verdicts in excess of $100 million, more than 35 over $10 million and hundreds of verdicts or settlements in excess of $1 million.

In 2004 one of the founding partners, Jock Smith, helped his client retain a verdict of $1.6 billion, the largest jury verdict in 2004.

In 2008 an attorney in the California office, Brian T. Dunn, achieved a landmark decision from the California Supreme Court in the case of Yount v. City of Sacramento. In 2013 in a separate case, Dunn achieved a $4.4 million settlement in the case of Marine Sergeant Manual "Manny" Loggins, a Marine stationed at Camp Pendleton, who was shot and killed by Orange County Sheriff's Deputy Darren Sandberg in the presence of Loggins' children.

In civil rights and police misconduct cases, The Cochran Firm often works alongside public figures and groups, such as the Rev. Jesse Jackson, Rev. Al Sharpton, and Black Lives Matter. In addition to wrongful death and personal injury, the firm also pursues other types of civil litigation such as Securities and Exchange fraud.

== Criminal defense practice ==
The Cochran Firm also has a criminal defense section. Notable clients include Sean "Puffy" Combs, O. J. Simpson, Snoop Dogg, Michael Jackson, Tupac Shakur, Todd Bridges, Riddick Bowe, Jim Brown and Latrell Sprewell. More recently the firm was counsel in the acquittal of former HealthSouth CEO, Richard Scrushy of all white collar charges in a $2.7 billion company earnings overstatement—the only successful defense of a defendant charged under the Sarbanes–Oxley Act. The firm also represented the family of a 15-year old shot by Akron police.

== Controversy ==
After Cochran's 2005 death, there were questions about changes in the firm's mission and personnel and whether the new criminal division would weaken the firm's traditional emphasis on civil cases, particularly civil rights and police abuse cases. There was concern in the Los Angeles black community about "white folks taking over Johnnie Cochran's firm". Brian Dunn, is the senior partner of the Los Angeles office.

Despite past controversy, The Cochran Firm remains a national legal presence. In 2013 Cochran's daughter, Tiffany Cochran Edwards, was interviewed about the continuing legacy of the firm and the pride her father would feel for the firm's work.
