= Ann O'Leary =

American political advisor, attorney and nonprofit leader (born 1971)

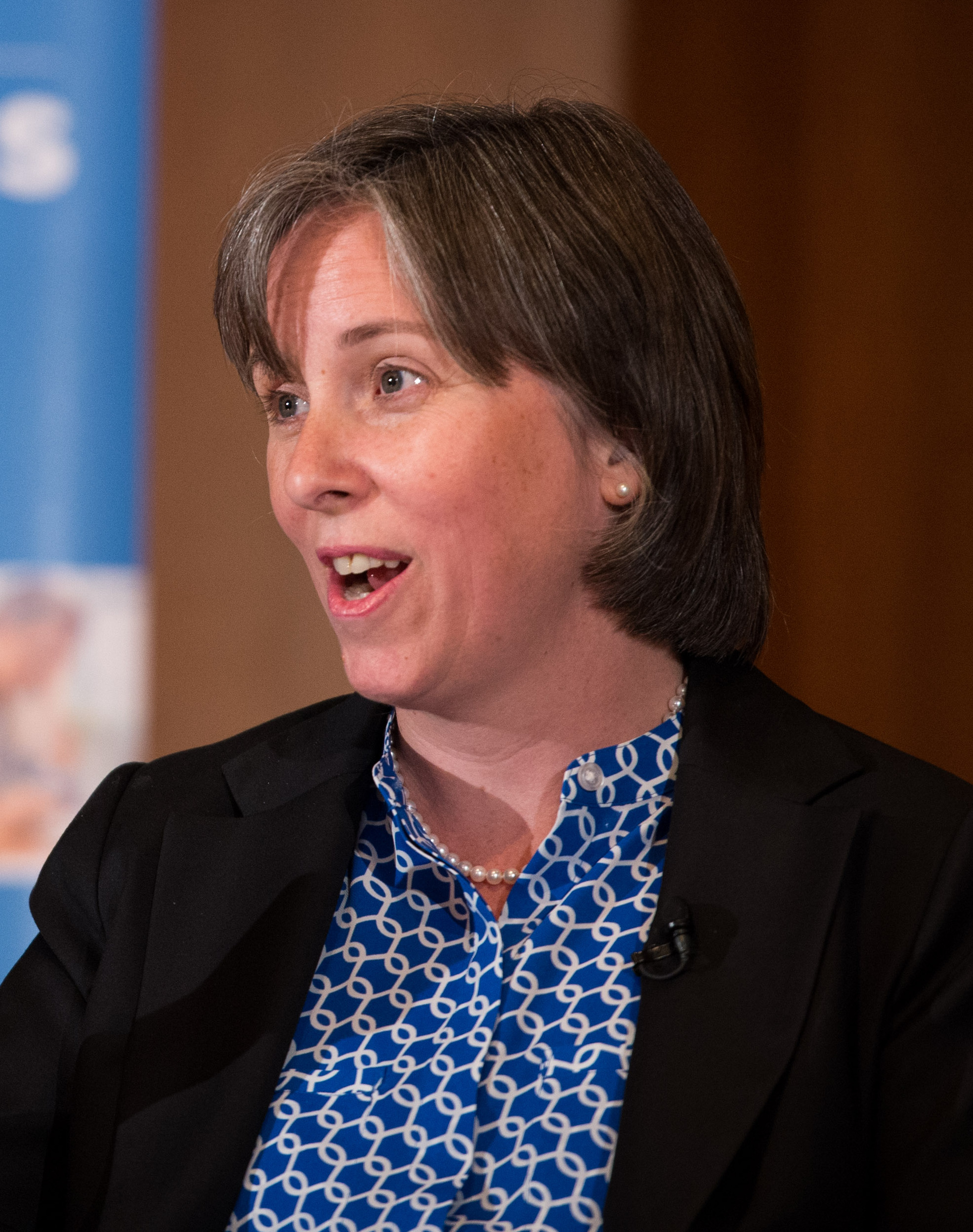
- Born: 1971 (age 54–55); Orono, Maine, U.S.
- Education: Mount Holyoke College (BA); Stanford University (MA); University of California, Berkeley (JD)
- Political party: Democratic
- Spouse: Goodwin Liu (m. 2002; sep. 2016)
- Children: 2

Ann M. O'Leary (born 1971) is an American political advisor, attorney, and nonprofit leader, who served as Chief of Staff to California Governor Gavin Newsom and as co-chair of the Governor's Task Force on Business and Jobs Recovery. Between 2021 and 2026, she was a partner at the international law firm Jenner & Block, before joining OpenAI as vice president of global policy.

O'Leary previously served as co-executive director of the Clinton-Kaine Transition Project, after serving as a senior policy advisor to Hillary Clinton's 2016 Presidential Campaign. After the 2016 Presidential election, she became a partner in the Silicon Valley office of an international law firm, where her practice focused on strategic consulting and crisis management.

Over her career, O'Leary has helped to establish several non-profit organizations promoting progressive policy on income inequality, health care, education, and workforce development. Early in her career, she served as legislative director to Senator Hillary Clinton and worked in the White House and the U.S. Department of Education.

== Early life and education ==
O'Leary was born and raised in Orono, Maine. She is the daughter of Charles John "Chick" O'Leary, a union leader, and Pamela Braley O'Leary, a social worker. She is of Irish descent.

After graduating from Orono High School, O'Leary attended Mount Holyoke College, where she was a member of the College Democrats. She earned a B.A. in critical social thought in 1993, a M.A. from the Stanford Graduate School of Education in 1997, and a J.D. from the University of California, Berkeley, School of Law in 2005.

== Career ==
=== Clinton administration ===
O'Leary began her career as a volunteer in the Clinton administration. She later worked as a Special Assistant to the President at the White House Domestic Policy Council. She also advised First Lady Hillary Clinton, acting as a liaison between Hillary Clinton's and President Bill Clinton's policy teams. In an August 2000 memo to Bill Clinton's Domestic Policy Adviser Bruce Reed, O'Leary urged the government to consider an executive order banning federal contractors from discriminating on the basis of sexual orientation, similar to one issued in 1941 by President Franklin D. Roosevelt banning them from race-based discrimination.

=== United States Senate ===
From 2001 to 2003, O'Leary was Hillary Clinton's Senate aide and legislative director. She oversaw a "wide range of issues," including passage of the 9/11 Victims Compensation Fund and the Medicare Prescription Drug, Improvement, and Modernization Act.

=== Legal career ===
Following her service in the U.S. Senate, O'Leary attended and graduated from the University of California, Berkeley School of Law in 2005. She clerked for Judge John T. Noonan, Jr. of the U.S. Ninth Circuit Court of Appeals. Following her judicial clerkship, O'Leary served as a deputy city attorney for the City of San Francisco, where she provided counsel to city agencies and served on the City Attorney's Affirmative Litigation Task Force. As a deputy city attorney, she helped develop the strategy to combat predatory lending practices by payday lenders, which resulted in a $7.5 million settlement for low-income victims.

=== Public policy ===
In 2008, O'Leary was appointed as a Lecturer and the founding executive director of the Center on Health, Economic & Family Security at the University of California, Berkeley School of Law. From 2008 to 2015, she also served as a Senior Fellow with the Center for American Progress. She published work regarding a variety of policy issues, including the international competitiveness of the American workforce. After President Barack Obama was elected, O'Leary advised his transition team on early childhood education.

In 2011, O'Leary was appointed as a senior vice president at Next Generation, a non-profit organization promoting progressive policy to address economic inequality and climate change.

O'Leary was recognized for her policy leadership in 2015 as one of Politico's Top 50 Thinkers, Doers, and Visionaries Transforming American Politics.

=== 2016 Hillary Clinton presidential campaign ===
During the 2016 United States presidential election, O'Leary served as one of three senior policy advisors to Hillary Clinton, focusing on developing policy related to health, education, labor, and economic security. For her role in the campaign, O'Leary was named to the Politico Top 50 list for a second consecutive year.

In August 2016, O'Leary was appointed as co-executive director of Clinton's transition team in Washington, D.C.

=== Post-2016 law practice ===
After the 2016 election, O'Leary joined the Silicon Valley office of international law firm Boies Schiller Flexner LLP, as a partner, where her practice focused on strategic consulting and crisis management. She has advised multiple high-profile organizations, including the Silicon Valley Community Foundation as it investigated and navigated allegations of a toxic work environment. A team of lawyers led by O'Leary published a report that found "many allegations from current and former employees were substantiated," and made recommendations for reform that were adopted by the Foundation's board in full.

O'Leary also represented numerous clients on a pro bono basis, including law professors in defending California's Sanctuary City laws, the National Women's Law Center in combating workplace sexual harassment, and Mark Barnes and Leana Wen in providing a public-health perspective to a case involving Connecticut's response to the threat of an Ebola outbreak.

In 2021, she joined Jenner & Block as one of the founding partners of its San Francisco office. In 2026, she left the firm to join OpenAI as vice president of global policy.

=== Chief of Staff to the Governor of California ===
On November 9, 2018, three days after Election Day, Governor-elect Gavin Newsom announced O'Leary as his incoming chief of staff.

In this role, O’Leary has championed several key administration initiatives, including an increase in California's earned income tax credit, expanded child care and paid family leave, subsidies to help families afford health insurance, new investments to build housing and reduce homelessness, and the promotion of civil rights, including Newsom's decision to halt capital punishment in the state.

In addition to serving as the Governor's highest-ranking advisor, O’Leary also led the Governor's energy strike team in the aftermath of devastating wildfires, which led to both safety improvements and new measures to fight climate change, including the Governor's executive order that requires that all new cars and passenger trucks sold in the state be zero-emission vehicles by 2035.

O’Leary co-chaired the Governor's Task Force on Business and Jobs Recovery after the onset of the COVID-19 pandemic. The task force released its final report in November 2020.

On December 21, 2020, O'leary resigned as Chief of Staff. Her resignation was announced along with the hiring of lobbyist Jim Deboo, who was selected to serve as Executive Secretary.

== Personal life ==
In 2002, O'Leary married Goodwin Liu, now a justice on the California Supreme Court. They have two children. On August 30, 2016, O'Leary and Liu announced in a joint statement that they were separating.
