= 2006 California Courts of Appeal election =

The 2006 California Courts of Appeal election was held November 7. The judges of the California Courts of Appeal are either approved to remain in their seat or rejected by the voters. All of the judges kept their seats.

== Results ==
The following results are from the California Secretary of State.

=== District 1 ===
==== Division 1 ====
Presiding Justice James Marchiano
Vote on retention	Votes	Percentage
Yes	792,381	44.21%
No	240,407	13.41%
Invalid or blank votes	759,437	42.37%
Totals	1,792,225	100.00%
Voter turnout	70.24%	

Associate Justice Sandra Margulies
Vote on retention	Votes	Percentage
Yes	813,712	45.40%
No	220,607	12.31%
Invalid or blank votes	757,906	42.29%
Totals	1,792,225	100.00%
Voter turnout	70.24%	

==== Division 2 ====
Associate Justice Paul Haerle
Vote on retention	Votes	Percentage
Yes	743,102	41.46%
No	257,672	14.38%
Invalid or blank votes	791,451	44.16%
Totals	1,792,225	100.00%
Voter turnout	70.24%	

Associate Justice James Richman
Vote on retention	Votes	Percentage
Yes	750,345	41.87%
No	247,222	13.79%
Invalid or blank votes	794,658	44.34%
Totals	1,792,225	100.00%
Voter turnout	70.24%	

==== Division 3 ====
Presiding Justice William McGuiness
Vote on retention	Votes	Percentage
Yes	769,962	42.96%
No	234,754	13.10%
Invalid or blank votes	787,509	43.94%
Totals	1,792,225	100.00%
Voter turnout	70.24%	

Associate Justice Peter Siggins
Vote on retention	Votes	Percentage
Yes	735,319	41.03%
No	256,576	14.32%
Invalid or blank votes	800,330	44.66%
Totals	1,792,225	100.00%
Voter turnout	70.24%	

==== Division 4 ====
Presiding Justice Ignazio Ruvolo
Vote on retention	Votes	Percentage
Yes	733,266	40.91%
No	265,706	14.83%
Invalid or blank votes	793,253	44.26%
Totals	1,792,225	100.00%
Voter turnout	70.24%	

Associate Justice Patricia Sepulveda
Vote on retention	Votes	Percentage
Yes	776,792	43.34%
No	227,692	12.70%
Invalid or blank votes	787,741	43.95%
Totals	1,792,225	100.00%
Voter turnout	70.24%	

Associate Justice Maria Rivera
Vote on retention	Votes	Percentage
Yes	779,408	43.49%
No	229,521	12.81%
Invalid or blank votes	783,296	43.71%
Totals	1,792,225	100.00%
Voter turnout	70.24%	

==== Division 5 ====
Presiding Justice Barbara Jones
Vote on retention	Votes	Percentage
Yes	807,489	45.06%
No	202,917	11.32%
Invalid or blank votes	781,819	43.62%
Totals	1,792,225	100.00%
Voter turnout	70.24%	

=== District 2 ===
==== Division 1 ====
Associate Justice Robert Mallano
Vote on retention	Votes	Percentage
Yes	1,031,863	41.55%
No	462,711	18.63%
Invalid or blank votes	988,842	39.82%
Totals	2,483,416	100.00%
Voter turnout	53.47%	

Associate Justice Frances Rothschild
Vote on retention	Votes	Percentage
Yes	989,965	39.86%
No	482,828	19.44%
Invalid or blank votes	1,010,623	40.69%
Totals	2,483,416	100.00%
Voter turnout	53.47%	

==== Division 2 ====
Presiding Justice Roger W. Boren
Vote on retention	Votes	Percentage
Yes	1,028,388	41.41%
No	430,774	17.35%
Invalid or blank votes	1,024,254	41.24%
Totals	2,483,416	100.00%
Voter turnout	53.47%	

Associate Justice Victoria Chavez
Vote on retention	Votes	Percentage
Yes	1,100,744	44.32%
No	398,166	16.03%
Invalid or blank votes	984,506	39.64%
Totals	2,483,416	100.00%
Voter turnout	53.47%	

==== Division 3 ====
Associate Justice Patti Kitching
Vote on retention	Votes	Percentage
Yes	1,055,073	42.48%
No	404,996	16.31%
Invalid or blank votes	1,023,347	41.21%
Totals	2,483,416	100.00%
Voter turnout	53.47%	

Associate Justice Richard Aldrich
Vote on retention	Votes	Percentage
Yes	1,037,867	41.79%
No	413,865	16.67%
Invalid or blank votes	1,031,684	41.54%
Totals	2,483,416	100.00%
Voter turnout	53.47%	

==== Division 4 ====
Presiding Justice Norman L. Epstein
Vote on retention	Votes	%
Yes	953,107	71.1%
No	388,246	28.9%
Invalid or blank votes		
Totals		100.00%
Voter turnout	70.24%	

Associate Justice Thomas L. Willhite
Vote on retention	Votes	%
Yes	931,558	70.4%
No	392,957	29.6%
Invalid or blank votes		
Totals		100.00%
Voter turnout	70.24%	

Associate Justice Nora M. Manella
Vote on retention	Votes	%
Yes	979,479	72.2%
No	377,896	27.8%
Invalid or blank votes		
Totals		100.00%
Voter turnout	70.24%	

Associate Justice Steven Suzukawa
Vote on retention	Votes	%
Yes	946,486	71.7%
No	375,318	28.3%
Invalid or blank votes		
Totals		100.00%
Voter turnout	70.24%	

==== Division 5 ====
Associate Justice Richard M. Mosk
Vote on retention	Votes	%
Yes	875,283	66.7%
No	437,336	33.3%
Invalid or blank votes		
Totals		100.00%
Voter turnout	70.24%	

Associate Justice Sandy R. Kriegler
Vote on retention	Votes	%
Yes	950,658	73.0%
No	352,287	27.0%
Invalid or blank votes		
Totals		100.00%
Voter turnout	70.24%	

==== Division 6 ====
Presiding Justice Arthur Gilbert
Vote on retention	Votes	%
Yes	922,473	70.6%
No	385,861	29.4%
Invalid or blank votes		
Totals		100.00%
Voter turnout	70.24%	

==== Division 7 ====
Presiding Justice Dennis M. Perluss
Vote on retention	Votes	%
Yes	870,683	66.8%
No	433,826	33.2%
Invalid or blank votes		
Totals		100.00%
Voter turnout	70.24%	

Associate Justice Fred Woods
Vote on retention	Votes	%
Yes	943,274	72.2%
No	364,495	27.8%
Invalid or blank votes		
Totals		100.00%
Voter turnout	70.24%	

Associate Justice Laurie D. Zelon
Vote on retention	Votes	%
Yes	924,529	70.1%
No	394,646	29.9%
Invalid or blank votes		
Totals		100.00%
Voter turnout	70.24%	

==== Division 8 ====
Presiding Justice Candace D. Cooper
Vote on retention	Votes	%
Yes	966,668	72.7%
No	363,240	27.3%
Invalid or blank votes		
Totals		100.00%
Voter turnout	70.24%	

Associate Justice Madeleine Flier
Vote on retention	Votes	%
Yes	937,365	70.5%
No	393,789	29.5%
Invalid or blank votes		
Totals		100.00%
Voter turnout	70.24%	

=== District 3 ===
Associate Justice Coleman A. Blease
Vote on retention	Votes	%
Yes	423,827	70.2%
No	179,947	29.8%
Invalid or blank votes		
Totals		100.00%
Voter turnout	70.24%	

Associate Justice Fred K. Morrison
Vote on retention	Votes	%
Yes	445,015	73.8%
No	158,134	26.2%
Invalid or blank votes		
Totals		100.00%
Voter turnout	70.24%	

Associate Justice Kathleen Butz
Vote on retention	Votes	%
Yes	435,606	72.0%
No	169,506	28.0%
Invalid or blank votes		
Totals		100.00%
Voter turnout	70.24%	

Associate Justice Tani Cantil-Sakauye
Vote on retention	Votes	%
Yes	419,230	70.4%
No	176,795	29.6%
Invalid or blank votes		
Totals		100.00%
Voter turnout	70.24%	

=== District 4 ===
==== Division 1 ====
Presiding Justice Judith McConnell
Vote on retention	Votes	%
Yes	1,039,051	73.5%
No	375,589	26.5%
Invalid or blank votes		
Totals		100.00%
Voter turnout	70.24%	

Associate Justice Patricia D. Benke
Vote on retention	Votes	%
Yes	1,040,010	75.2%
No	343,890	24.8%
Invalid or blank votes		
Totals		100.00%
Voter turnout	70.24%	

Associate Justice Richard D. Huffman
Vote on retention	Votes	%
Yes	1,017,127	74.3%
No	353,211	25.7%
Invalid or blank votes		
Totals		100.00%
Voter turnout	70.24%	

Associate Justice Judith L. Haller
Vote on retention	Votes	%
Yes	1,016,790	74.5%
No	348,454	25.5%
Invalid or blank votes		
Totals		100.00%
Voter turnout	70.24%	

Associate Justice Cynthia G. Aaron
Vote on retention	Votes	%
Yes	967,672	71.2%
No	393,082	28.8%
Invalid or blank votes		
Totals		100.00%
Voter turnout	70.24%	

Associate Justice Joan K. Irion
Vote on retention	Votes	%
Yes	943,357	69.8%
No	410,059	30.2%
Invalid or blank votes		
Totals		100.00%
Voter turnout	70.24%	

==== Division 2 ====
Associate Justice Art W. McKinster
Vote on retention	Votes	%
Yes	994,093	73.9%
No	352,637	26.1%
Invalid or blank votes		
Totals		100.00%
Voter turnout	70.24%	

Associate Justice Betty A. Richli
Vote on retention	Votes	%
Yes	1,001,627	74.3%
No	347,537	25.7%
Invalid or blank votes		
Totals		100.00%
Voter turnout	70.24%	

Associate Justice Jeffrey King
Vote on retention	Votes	%
Yes	942,365	70.4%
No	398,051	29.6%
Invalid or blank votes		
Totals		100.00%
Voter turnout	70.24%	

Associate Justice Douglas P. Miller
Vote on retention	Votes	%
Yes	1,001,261	74.7%
No	340,153	25.3%
Invalid or blank votes		
Totals		100.00%
Voter turnout	70.24%	

==== Division 3 ====
Associate Justice Kathleen E. O’Leary
Vote on retention	Votes	%
Yes	987,566	73.0%
No	367,110	27.0%
Invalid or blank votes		
Totals		100.00%
Voter turnout	70.24%	

Associate Justice Raymond J. Ikola
Vote on retention	Votes	%
Yes	962,120	72.0%
No	375,428	28.0%
Invalid or blank votes		
Totals		100.00%
Voter turnout	70.24%	

=== District 5 ===
Associate Justice Thomas A. Harris
Vote on retention	Votes	%
Yes	331,103	74.2%
No	115,207	25.8%
Invalid or blank votes		
Totals		100.00%
Voter turnout	70.24%	

Associate Justice Rebecca A. Wiseman
Vote on retention	Votes	%
Yes	329,733	73.6%
No	118,782	26.4%
Invalid or blank votes		
Totals		100.00%
Voter turnout	70.24%	

Associate Justice Betty L. Dawson
Vote on retention	Votes	%
Yes	307,237	69.1%
No	137,811	30.9%
Invalid or blank votes		
Totals		100.00%
Voter turnout	70.24%	

Associate Justice Stephen J. Kane
Vote on retention	Votes	%
Yes	328,617	73.9%
No	116,461	26.1%
Invalid or blank votes		
Totals		100.00%
Voter turnout	70.24%	

Associate Justice Brad R. Hill
Vote on retention	Votes	%
Yes	328,020	74.3%
No	113,785	25.7%
Invalid or blank votes		
Totals		100.00%
Voter turnout	70.24%	

=== District 6 ===
Presiding Justice Conrad L. Rushing
Vote on retention	Votes	%
Yes	286,120	75.0%
No	95,711	25.0%
Invalid or blank votes		
Totals		100.00%
Voter turnout	70.24%	

Associate Justice Nathan D. Mihara
Vote on retention	Votes	%
Yes	288,961	76.1%
No	91,101	23.9%
Invalid or blank votes		
Totals		100.00%
Voter turnout	70.24%	

Associate Justice Richard J. McAdams
Vote on retention	Votes	%
Yes	283,549	75.3%
No	93,305	24.7%
Invalid or blank votes		
Totals		100.00%
Voter turnout	70.24%	

Associate Justice Wendy Clark Duffy
Vote on retention	Votes	%
Yes	305,083	80.0%
No	76,289	20.0%
Invalid or blank votes		
Totals		100.00%
Voter turnout	70.24%	
