= Mariano-Florentino Cuéllar =

American lawyer and political scientist (born 1972)

Tino Cuéllar
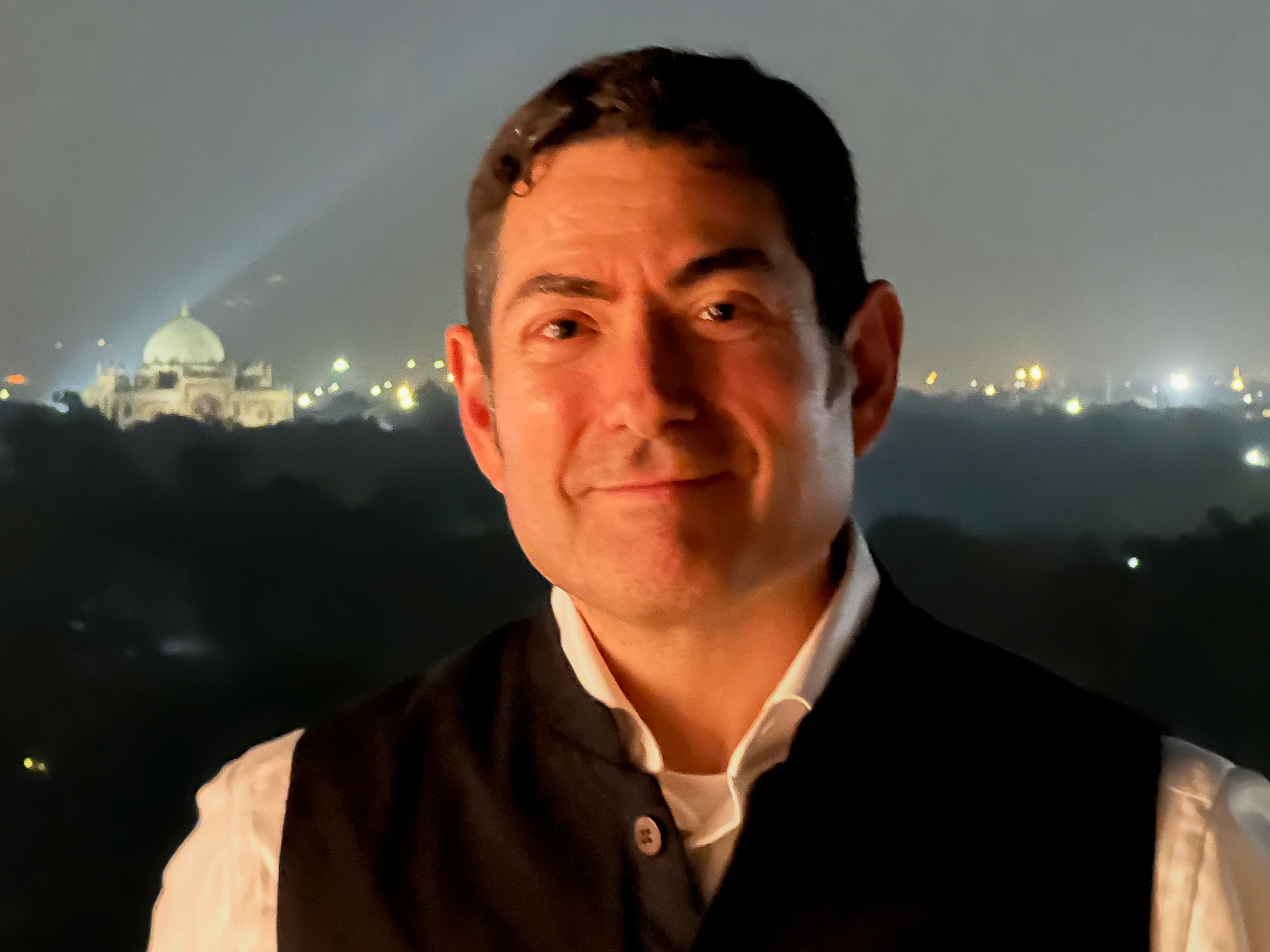

10th President of the Carnegie Endowment for International Peace
- In office October 31, 2021 – July 1, 2026
- Preceded by: William J. Burns
- Succeeded by: Avril Haines

Justice of the Supreme Court of California
- In office January 5, 2015 – October 30, 2021
- Appointed by: Jerry Brown
- Preceded by: Marvin R. Baxter
- Succeeded by: Patricia Guerrero

Personal details
- Born: Mariano-Florentino Cuéllar; July 27, 1972 (age 54) Matamoros, Mexico
- Party: Democratic
- Spouse: Lucy Koh
- Children: 2
- Education: Harvard University (BA); Yale University (JD); Stanford University (MA, PhD)

Mariano-Florentino "Tino" Cuéllar (born July 27, 1972) is an American scholar, jurist, former government official, and executive who is the Cameron Schrier Family Professor of Law at Stanford University and Chief Global Affairs Officer at Anthropic. He was previously the 10th president of the Carnegie Endowment for International Peace, a justice of the Supreme Court of California, the director of Stanford's Freeman Spogli Institute for International Studies, and an executive branch appointee in the Clinton, Obama, and Biden administrations. He has chaired the board of the William & Flora Hewlett Foundation and serves on the Harvard Corporation.

== Early life and education ==
Cuéllar was born in Matamoros, Tamaulipas, Mexico. He attended schools in Mexico and the U.S., including a Catholic school in Brownsville, Texas. At age 14, he immigrated with his family to Calexico, California, where he attended and later graduated from Calexico High School.

Cuéllar graduated with a Bachelor of Arts, magna cum laude, from Harvard University in 1993, a Juris Doctor degree from Yale Law School in 1997, and a Doctor of Philosophy degree in political science from Stanford University in 2000. In law school, Cuéllar co-founded a not-for-profit organization providing opportunities for students to teach English in underserved communities, and spent summers working at the U.S. Senate and the President's Council of Economic Advisers.

== Professional career ==
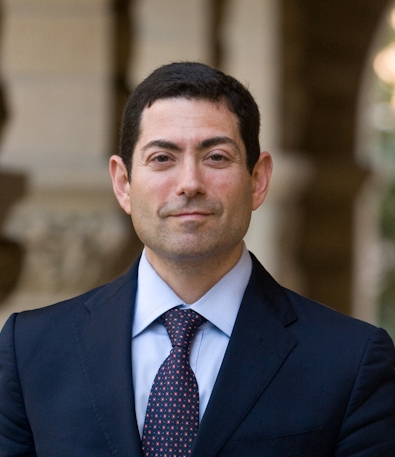
Mariano-Florentino Cuéllar in 2013

After law school, Cuéllar worked at the U.S. Department of the Treasury and clerked for Chief Judge Mary M. Schroeder on the U.S. Court of Appeals for the Ninth Circuit.

He joined the faculty of Stanford Law School in 2001. He was named Professor of Law and Deane F. Johnson Faculty Scholar in 2007 and Professor (by courtesy) of Political Science in the School of Humanities and Sciences in 2010, and became Stanley Morrison Professor of Law in 2012. At Stanford, he also served as co-director of the university's interdisciplinary Center for International Security and Cooperation (CISAC), working with former Los Alamos National Laboratory Director Siegfried Hecker.

In 2013, he was chosen to succeed former Stanford president Gerhard Casper as director of the Freeman Spogli Institute for International Studies, Stanford's principal institution for research and education on international affairs, and CISAC's parent organization. During the years he led the Freeman Spogli Institute and CISAC, Cuéllar grew the Institute's faculty, launched university-wide initiatives on global poverty and on cybersecurity, expanded Stanford's role in nuclear security and arms control research and policy, increased support for global health and governance projects, and broadened opportunities for student and faculty research abroad.

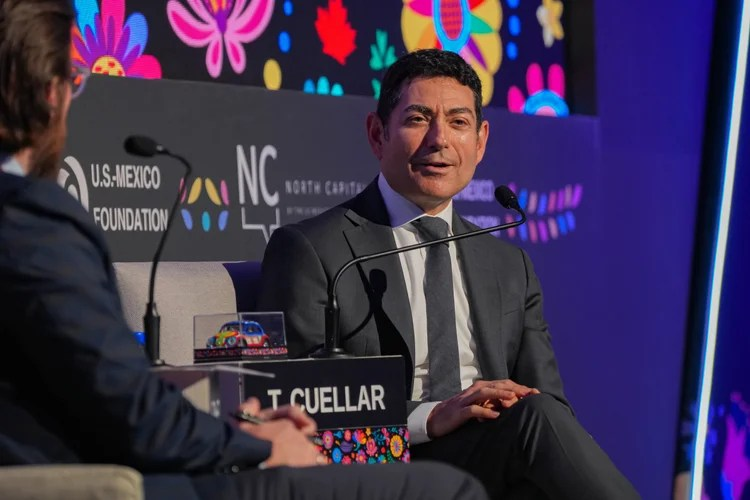
Mariano-Florentino Cuéllar in 2025 at the North Capital Forum

Cuéllar is a scholar of public law, complex organizations, and political economy whose research and teaching explore problems in administrative law and democracy, artificial intelligence and the law, international affairs, and public health and safety. His publications include Government by Algorithm (ACUS, 2020; co-authored); Administrative Law: The American Public Law System (West, 2020, 2014; co-authored); Governing Security (Stanford University Press, 2013); and numerous articles on administrative agencies, democracy, regulatory and criminal enforcement, public health law, law and development, the history of institutions, technological change, international law, and domestic and international security. He has taught undergraduate, graduate, and law students.

During 2009 and 2010, Cuéllar took leave from Stanford and served as Special Assistant to President Obama for Justice and Regulatory Policy at the White House Domestic Policy Council. While at the White House, he led the Domestic Policy Council's work on criminal and civil justice, public health and safety, and immigration. He was involved in negotiating bipartisan passage of the Fair Sentencing Act, the Food Safety Modernization Act, and the Family Smoking Prevention and Tobacco Control Act, and repeal of the military's Don't Ask/Don't Tell policy. He also coordinated the Food Safety Working Group, a new inter-agency effort revamping federal food safety efforts. Before working at the White House, Cuéllar was a member of the Obama-Biden Transition Project, where he co-directed the working group on immigration, borders, and refugee policy.

U.S. Education Secretary Arne Duncan selected Cuéllar to serve as co-chair of a national commission on education excellence in 2011. On February 19, 2013, the 27-member Commission delivered a unanimous report to Duncan raising serious concerns about the state of American public education. To reduce the nation's achievement gaps, the report recommended local, state, and federal reforms addressing school finance and efficiency, teaching and learning opportunities, early childhood education, and other areas.

In 2011, Cuéllar was mentioned as a possible candidate for consideration by California Governor Jerry Brown to fill the vacancy on the California Supreme Court created by the retirement of Justice Carlos R. Moreno. Initially, Cuéllar was not interested in a judicial appointment. Brown ultimately nominated Goodwin Liu, who was confirmed to the court that year.

On July 22, 2014, Brown nominated Cuéllar to the California Supreme Court, filling a vacancy created by the retirement of Justice Marvin Baxter. He was given the highest possible rating, "exceptionally well-qualified", by the California State Bar's independent Judicial Nominations Evaluation Commission.

On August 28, 2014, the California Commission on Judicial Appointments unanimously confirmed Cuéllar. He was sworn in on January 5, 2015. During his tenure, he was mentioned as a potential U.S. Supreme Court nominee to fill the vacancy created by Justice Antonin Scalia's death.

On September 16, 2021, the Carnegie Endowment for International Peace announced that Cuéllar would succeed William J. Burns as its next president after Burns was appointed CIA director. He stepped down from the California Supreme Court before assuming his new position. During the Biden administration, he concurrently served on the State Department's Foreign Affairs Policy Board and the President's Intelligence Advisory Board.

In January 2026, Cuéllar was appointed a member of Anthropic's Long-Term Benefit Trust, the company's independent governance structure. In August 2026 he stepped down from the Long-Term Benefit Trust to begin a new role as Anthropic's chief global affairs officer, leading public policy and global strategy and managing relationships with the US government as well as other countries where Anthropic provides services.

== Academia and philanthropy ==
Beginning in 2004, Cuéllar held several leadership positions at Stanford University. In addition to serving as director of the Freeman Spogli Institute and leading CISAC, he led the Stanford Cyber Initiative, and earlier the Honors Program in International Security Studies. He chaired the Center for Advanced Study in the Behavioral Sciences's board of directors, and also chaired the board of the Stanford Institute for Innovation in Developing Economies (Stanford Seed) at the Stanford Graduate School of Business. He was Stanford University's principal commencement speaker in 2017. On February 10, 2019, he was elected to the Harvard Corporation (the President and Fellows of Harvard College). He chaired the board of the William and Flora Hewlett Foundation from 2021 to 2026 and was a member of the board from 2014 to 2026.

== California Supreme Court ==
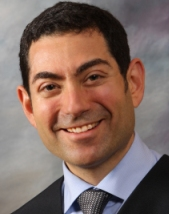
Cuéllar's official California Supreme Court photo in January 2015

Cuéllar served on the Supreme Court of California from January 2015 to November 2021. His record has been described as reflecting a "practical view of the law that shows in both his questions during hearings and in his written rulings". Cuéllar "wrote some of the court's highest profile rulings and led an effort to break down language barriers in courthouses throughout the state". His opinions include:

In re Kenneth Humphrey (2021), finding unconstitutional the practice of conditioning an arrested person's freedom solely on whether the person can afford to post bail.

United Auburn Indian Community v. Newsom (2020), holding that California's Constitution and separation of powers jurisprudence empower the governor to represent the state in matters involving the federal government, including by lawfully participating in a cooperative federalism arrangement administered by the U.S. Department of the Interior, because of "the Governor's historical practice of concurring under a variety of federal statutes, the legislatively enacted expectation that the Governor represent the state's interests in negotiations or proceedings involving the federal government, and the absence of any explicit constitutional or statutory limits on the Governor's power to concur".

SoCalGas Cases (2019), ruling that businesses affected by the release of methane and other gases from the Aliso Canyon gas leak cannot recover in negligence for purely economic losses, because recovery for such losses generally requires a "special relationship" and "the ripple effects of industrial catastrophe on this scale in an interconnected economy defy judicial creation of more finely tuned rules".

De la Torre v. CashCall (2018), concluding that interest rates on consumer loans can be so high that they become "unconscionable" and therefore void under California law.

T.H. v. Novartis Pharmaceuticals (2017), finding that a manufacturer of a brand-name drug may be liable for injuries blamed on chemically equivalent generic drugs manufactured by other companies, even if the original manufacturer divests itself of any interest in the brand-name drug.

Association of California Insurance Companies v. Jones (2017), finding that the California Insurance Commissioner has broad authority under the Unfair Insurance Practices Act to establish standards governing estimates of the replacement costs for homes destroyed by wildfires and other threats.

People v. Buza (2018, dissent), disagreeing with the majority's ruling that California could constitutionally impose a requirement, without further judicial process, that all felony arrestees provide DNA samples to the state upon arrest and explaining why California courts have a continuing responsibility to interpret and apply relevant state constitutional provisions even when related federal constitutional provisions exist.

In his dissent in Cleveland National Forest Foundation v. San Diego Association of Governments (2017), Cuéllar wrote that San Diego's multi-decade regional transit plan did not adequately disclose its failure to contribute materially to the achievement of California's greenhouse gas emissions reduction goals to avert climate change despite the feasibility of reasonable alternatives that could have achieved greater compliance with California's climate related goals.

== Legal reform ==
Before serving in the judiciary, Cuéllar was elected to the American Law Institute (ALI) in 2008 and to the ALI Council in 2014. He has worked on several ALI projects, including Model Penal Code: Sentencing, Principles of Government Ethics, and Restatement Fourth, The Foreign Relations Law of the United States. In 2010, President Barack Obama appointed Cuéllar to the council of the nonpartisan U.S. Administrative Conference, an independent agency dedicated to improving the efficiency and fairness of federal administrative procedures. From 2010 until his appointment to the judiciary in 2015, he also served on the board of directors of the Constitution Project, a nonprofit think tank whose goal is to build bipartisan consensus on constitutional issues affecting the rule of law and criminal justice.

== Personal life ==
Cuéllar is married to United States Circuit Judge Lucy Koh of the United States Court of Appeals for the Ninth Circuit. They have two children.

== See also ==
- Barack Obama Supreme Court candidates
- Joe Biden Supreme Court candidates
- List of Hispanic and Latino American jurists
- List of justices of the Supreme Court of California
- Foreign Affairs Policy Board

== Select publications ==
=== Books ===
- Cuéllar, Mariano-Florentino (2013). Governing Security: The Hidden Origins of American Security Agencies. Stanford, CA: Stanford University Press. ISBN 978-0-8047-7069-9.

=== Selected articles ===
- The Fractured Superpower, Foreign Affairs, September 6, 2022 (co-authored with Jenna Bednar)
- Cuéllar, Mariano-Florentino & Huq, Aziz (2020). "Economies of Surveillance" (PDF). Harv. L. Rev. 133: 1280–1336.
- Cuéllar, Mariano-Florentino (2018). "From Doctrine to Safeguards in American Constitutional Democracy". UCLA L. Rev. 65: 1398–1428.
- Cuéllar, Mariano-Florentino (2017). "Beyond Weber: Law and Leadership in an Institutionally Fragile World" (PDF). Stan. L. Rev. 69: 1781–1793.
- Cuéllar, Mariano-Florentino (2014). "Administrative War". Geo. Wash. L. Rev. 82: 1343–1445. SSRN 2529882.
- Cuéllar, Mariano-Florentino (2014). "Modeling Partial Agency Autonomy in Public Health Policymaking". Theoretical Inquiries in Law. 15 (2): 471–505. doi:10.1515/til-2014-0209. S2CID 73573493.
- Cuéllar, Mariano-Florentino (2012). "The Political Economies of Immigration Law". U.C. Irvine L. Rev. 2: 1–90.
- Cuéllar, Mariano-Florentino (2009). ""Securing" the Nation: Law, Politics, and Organization at the Federal Security Agency, 1939–1953". U. Chi. L. Rev. 76: 587–717.
- Cuellar, Mariano-Florentino (2005). "Rethinking Regulatory Democracy". Admin. L. Rev. 57: 411–500.
- Cuellar, Mariano-Florentino (2004). "Reflections on Sovereignty and Collective Security". Stan. J. Int'l L. 40: 211–257.
- Cuéllar, Mariano-Florentino (2003). "The Tenuous Relationship Between the Fight Against Money Laundering and the Disruption of Criminal Finance". J. Crim. L. & Criminology. 93: 311–465.

== Video ==
- Appearances on C-SPAN

Legal offices
Preceded by Marvin Baxter	Associate Justice of the Supreme Court of California; 2015–2021	Succeeded by Patricia Guerrero
