= Yount v. City of Sacramento =

- Supreme Court of California

Decided May 19, 2008
- Full case name: Steven Yount v. City of Sacramento, et al.
- Citation(s): 43 Cal.4th 885; 183 P.3d 471

Holding
- The plaintiff's claims were barred under Heck v. Humphrey, 512 U.S. 477, 129 L. Ed. 2d 383, 114 S. Ct. 2364 (1994), to the extent that they alleged that the defendant officer was not entitled to use any level of force against the plaintiff because the plaintiff's acts of kicking, spitting, and refusing to co-operate with the officers justified the officers in using reasonable force to subdue him. However, the plaintiff's claims were not barred by Heck v. Humphrey to the extent that they alleged that the defendant officer was not justified in using deadly force against the plaintiff in response to the plaintiff's acts of resistance.

Court membership
- Chief Justice: Ronald M. George
- Associate Justices: Marvin A. Baxter, Joyce L. Kennard, Ming W. Chin Carlos R. Moreno, Carol A. Corrigan, Kathryn M. Werdegar

Case opinions
- Majority: Baxter, joined by George, Kennard, Chin, Moreno, and Corrigan
- Concurrence: Werdegar

Yount v. City of Sacramento was a decision of the California Supreme Court, which significantly expanded the rights of a convicted arrestee subjected to excessive force during arrest. The case was brought by Brian T. Dunn of The Cochran Firm in California, on behalf of Steven Yount when Yount was shot by a Sacramento police officer after being handcuffed during a DUI arrest.

== Background ==
During the early morning hours of March 10, 2001, Steven Yount, the plaintiff in the Yount case, left his home, got into his car and drove to a 7-Eleven store in Sacramento to purchase alcohol. Yount had already consumed beer and liquor that morning and was very drunk. A security guard in the parking lot of the 7-Eleven called police after he observed the visibly-intoxicated Yount attempting to get back into his vehicle. Sacramento Police Department Officer Samuel Davis arrived at the 7-Eleven, approached Yount's car, and asked him to step out of the vehicle.

He complied with Davis's request to get out of the car but refused to get inside the patrol vehicle. After some effort, Davis was able to secure Yount in the backseat of his patrol vehicle. In the backseat of the patrol vehicle, Yount shouted obscenities and racial slurs at Davis and kicked and banged his head against the side and window of the patrol vehicle.

With the assistance of two security guards in the area, Davis was able to pull Yount out of the patrol vehicle, handcuff him, and place him back inside the patrol vehicle. After he was placed back inside the patrol vehicle, he continued to shout and kick and bang his head against the doors of the vehicle. Sacramento Police Department Officers Debra Hatfield, Daniel Swafford, and Thomas Schrum responded to the 7-Eleven to assist Davis.

Schrum opened the door of Davis's patrol vehicle to ask Yount for identification. When Schrum opened the door of the patrol vehicle, Yount popped out of the vehicle, attempted to move right in Schrum's face, and continued to yell and curse at the officers. Schrum forced Yount back into the patrol vehicle. Yount continued yelling obscenities at the officers and banging on the patrol vehicle while kicking his legs at Schrum. Swafford tased Yount.

After Swafford deployed the Taser, Yount became more violent and continued to yell obscenities and racial slurs at the officers. Yount also kicked out the window of Davis's patrol vehicle. The officers decided to restrain Yount's legs before they placed him into a different patrol vehicle. When they attempted to pull Yount out of Davis's patrol vehicle, Yount refused to co-operate and resisted the officers' efforts to remove him from the vehicle.

The officers eventually managed to pull Yount out of the patrol vehicle. After the officers pulled him out of the patrol vehicle, Davis stumbled and fell to the ground. Yount kicked him and spat at him. Davis got on top of Yount, who was continuing to struggle and shout, and the officers were able to secure Yount's legs with ankle restraints. He continued to resist the officers by kicking and spitting at them. Schrum pulled out what he thought was a Taser and fired it at the back of Yount's thigh. Then, Schrum realized that he had mistakenly grabbed his firearm, instead of his Taser. Yount sustained a gunshot wound to his left buttock.

== Civil rights case ==
After the incident, Yount was charged with resisting arrest in violation of California Penal Code, section 148, and driving under the influence. He pleaded no contest to and was convicted of both offenses. After the conclusion of the criminal proceedings, Brian T. Dunn, an attorney at The Cochran Firm, specializing in civil rights cases, filed a civil action on Yount's behalf against Schrum and the City of Sacramento in the Sacramento County Superior Court, alleging a claim for violation of civil rights under Section 1983 of Title 42 of the United States Code, among others. The complaint alleged that Schrum had shot him without justification and violated his constitutional rights.

The defendants argued that the 42 U.S.C. 1983 claim was a collateral attack on the conviction for resisting arrest and so was barred by Heck v. Humphrey, 512 U.S. 477, 129 L. Ed. 2d 383, 114 S. Ct. 2364 (1994). That was a US Supreme Court decision that held that a plaintiff is barred from prosecuting a 42 U.S.C. 1983 action if the successful resolution of the action would necessarily imply the invalidity of a criminal conviction of the plaintiff.

The issue was whether a finding in favor of Yount on his 42 U.S.C. 1983 claim would "necessarily imply the invalidity" of his criminal conviction for resisting arrest. Submitted to the California Supreme Court for decision. The appeal was briefed and argued by Dunn.

== Decision ==
The California Supreme Court held that the civil claims were barred to the extent that they alleged that Schrum was not entitled to use any force during the incident, as the use of resistance justified the use of reasonable force in response to his actions. The Court further held, however, that the civil claims were not barred, as to the use of deadly force, as it was not reasonable under the circumstances. The conviction for resisting arrest did not, by itself, provide a justification for the use of deadly force.

In holding that success on the claim of excessive deadly force would not necessarily imply the invalidity of his conviction for resisting arrest, the California Supreme Court analyzed the relationship between his acts of resistance and Schrum's misconduct. The Court began its analysis by noting that Officer Schrum was justified in using "reasonable force" against Mr. Yount, who was kicking, spitting, and refusing to co-operate with the officers in the moments prior to the shooting. Consequently, to the extent that his claims alleged that he was not resisting or obstructing the officers and that the officers were not justified in using any level of force against him, they would be inconsistent with his conviction for resisting and so were barred by Heck.

The California Supreme Court also noted, however, that he had alleged that the use of deadly force was excessive under the circumstances and not justified by his acts of resistance during the incident. The Court held that to the extent that his claims were based on Schrum's unjustifiable use of deadly force, the claims were not barred under Heck because the evidence did not support the use of deadly force against Yount. His criminal conviction for resisting arrest, standing alone, did not establish a justification for Schrum's use of deadly force against him. Accordingly, Yount's claim that the use of deadly force was not a reasonable response to his acts of resistance did not call the validity of his conviction for resisting arrest into question.

== Legacy ==
The decision has been followed by a number of courts confronted with cases involving similar facts, including the California Court of Appeals, the Ninth Circuit Court of Appeals, and federal district courts in California.
