= California Supreme Court Historical Society =

The California Supreme Court Historical Society (CSCHS) describes itself as "a non-profit public benefit corporation dedicated to recovering, preserving, and promoting California’s legal and judicial history, with a particular emphasis on the State’s highest court."

It is chaired by Patricia Guerrero, the chief justice of California.

== Activities ==
The California Supreme Court Historical Society's principal activity is historical research on the California Supreme Court. To this aim, it compiles and publishes oral histories of retired judges. Furthermore, the society conducts educational programs, assists with exhibitions, court tours, and the archiving of historical materials.

== Publications ==
It publishes an annual scholarly journal titled California Legal History, and also publishes a biannual called CSCHS Review.

California Legal History is a scholarly journal that publishes research, articles, and edited oral histories.

CSCHS Review addresses a variety of topics including legal histories, biographies, judicial decisions, and book reviews.

== Selma Moidel Smith writing competition ==
The Selma Moidel Smith writing competition is a law student writing competition in California legal history, which aims to promote research and writing on the California Supreme Court and the state's legal history.
