= Jenna Bednar =

American political scientist

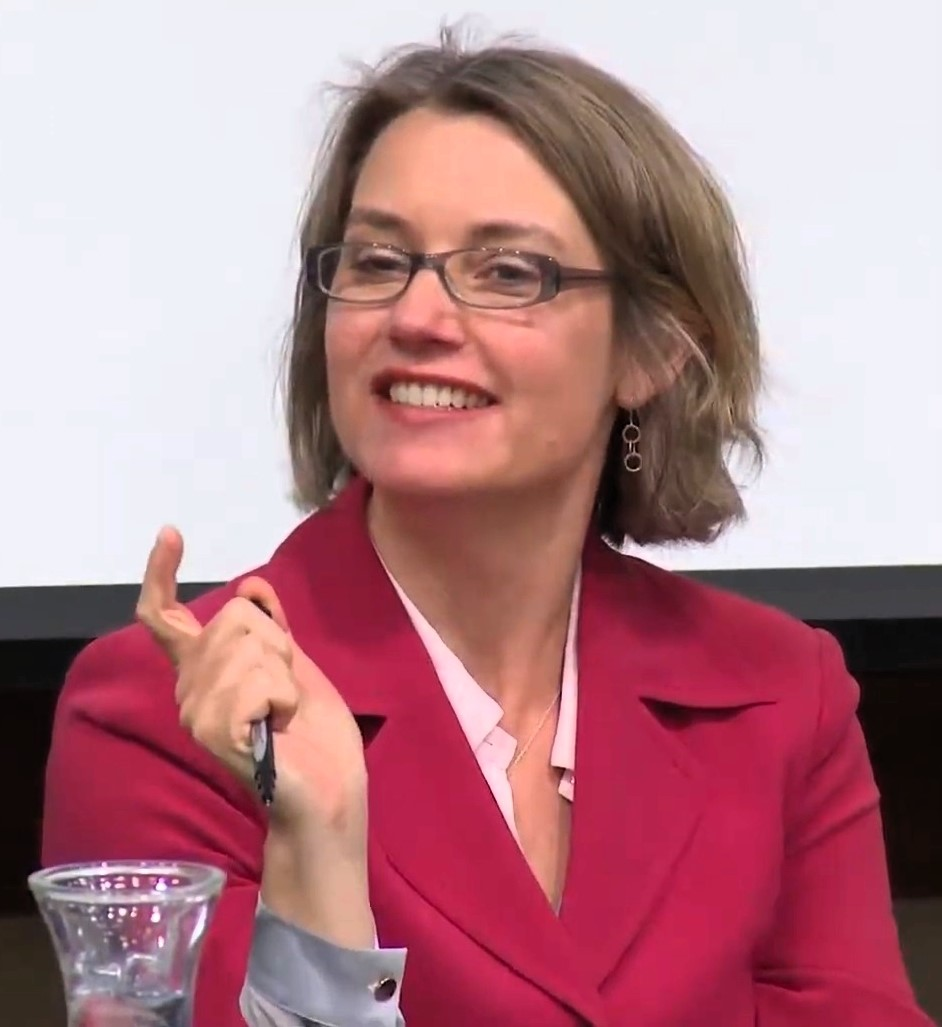
- Bednar in 2017
- Education: Stanford University; University of Michigan
- Scientific career
- Workplaces: University of Michigan
- Thesis: The federal problem : the political economy of federal stability (1998)

Jenna Bednar is an American political scientist currently serving as Professor of Public Policy at the University of Michigan. In 2019, her book The Robust Federation: Principles of Design received the American Political Science Association's Martha Derthick Book Award.

== Early life and education ==
Bednar was an undergraduate at the University of Michigan. She moved to Stanford University as a doctoral researcher, where she earned a PhD in 1998. Her doctorate investigated the political economy of federal stability. After graduating, she worked at the University of Iowa.

== Research and career ==
Bednar studies the political mechanisms that give rise to stabilities in federal states. She has studied how institutions maintain and distribute authority. Her research showed that the distribution of authority by a constitution can be meaningless if governments do not abide by them. With a focus on the United States, she has examined how the federal government takes advantage of state governments.

In 2009, Bednar published The Robust Federation, Principles of Design, a book which examines how federal constitution can produce resilient governments. The book is mainly theoretical, and was inspired by the writings of the Founding Fathers of the United States. In 2019, The Robust Federation: Principles of Design was awarded the American Political Science Association Martha Derthick Book Award.

== Publications ==
=== Books ===
- Bednar, Jenna (2009). The robust federation : principles of design. Cambridge, UK: Cambridge University Press. ISBN 978-0-511-46431-7. OCLC 313651876.
- Ferejohn, John; Rakove, Jack N.; Riley, Jonathan (October 8, 2001). Constitutional Culture and Democratic Rule. Cambridge University Press. ISBN 978-0-521-79370-4.
- Bednar, Jenna; Page, Scott (February 2007). "Can Game(s) Theory Explain Culture?: The Emergence of Cultural Behavior Within Multiple Games". Rationality and Society. 19 (1): 65–97. doi:10.1177/1043463107075108. S2CID 14181429.

=== Articles ===
- The Fractured Superpower, Foreign Affairs, September 6, 2022 (co-authored with Mariano-Florentino Cuéllar)
