= Kelli Evans =

American judge (born 1968 or 1969)

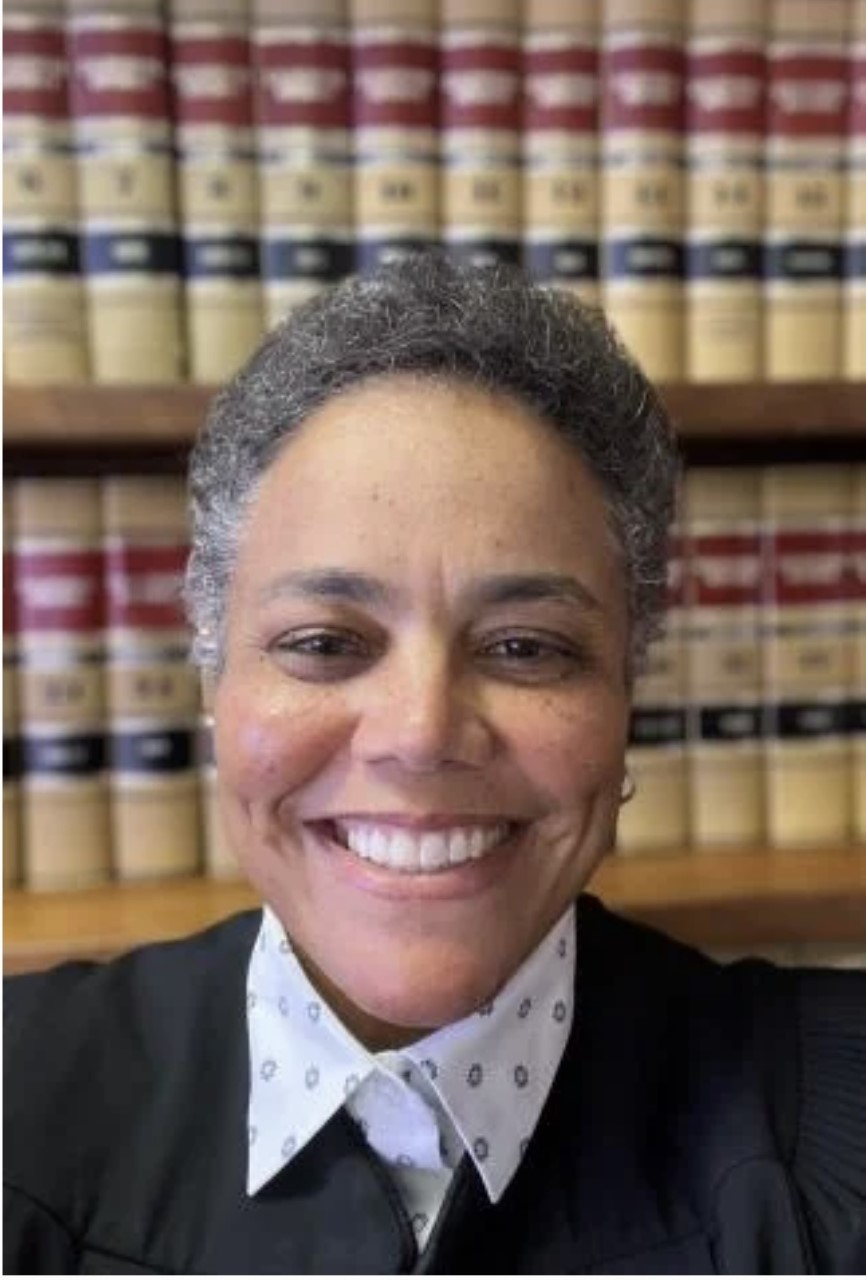

Associate Justice of the California Supreme Court
- Incumbent
- Assumed office January 2, 2023
- Appointed by: Gavin Newsom
- Preceded by: Patricia Guerrero

Personal details
- Born: 1968 or 1969 (age 57–58)
- Party: Democratic
- Spouse: Terri Shaw
- Children: 1
- Education: Stanford University (BA); University of California, Davis (JD)

Kelli Evans (born 1968 or 1969) is an American lawyer who serves as an associate justice of the Supreme Court of California. She previously served as a judge of the Alameda County Superior Court.

== Education ==
Evans received a Bachelor of Arts from Stanford University in 1991 and a Juris Doctor from UC Davis School of Law in 1994.

== Career ==
In 1995, Evans served as the assistant public defender in the Sacramento County Public Defender's Office. From 1998 to 2001, she was a senior trial attorney at the United States Department of Justice Civil Rights Division. From 2001 to 2004, she was an associate with Relman and Associates in Washington D.C. and partner at Independent Assessment & Monitoring LLP from 2006 to 2010. From 2010 to 2013, she was the associate director of the ACLU of Northern California, where she previously served as an attorney from 1995 to 1998. From 2014 to 2017, she served as the senior director for the administration of justice at the California State Bar and from 2017 to 2019, she was special assistant to the attorney general at the California Department of Justice. Evans was a member of the Cleveland Police Monitoring Team. Evans served as a federal court monitor overseeing that the Oakland, California, police department complied with a consent decree that required civil rights reforms. Prior to being appointed to the bench, Evans was chief deputy legal affairs secretary in the Office of Governor Newsom. Evans served as a judge of the Alameda County Superior Court from 2021 to 2023.

=== California Supreme Court ===
On August 10, 2022, California Governor Gavin Newsom nominated Evans to serve as an associate justice of the Supreme Court of California, to the seat to be vacated by Patricia Guerrero, who has been nominated to serve as chief justice. She is the first openly lesbian associate justice, and the second out African-American to serve on the court. On November 10, 2022, the Commission on Judicial Appointments voted unanimously to approve Evans to the California Supreme Court. She was sworn into office on January 2, 2023. As of 2023, with her swearing in, Black justices make up half of the associate justices on the court. She is the first openly LGBTQ Woman and first LGBTQ Woman of Color to serve on the court.

== Personal life ==
Evans is a Democrat. Evans and her wife, Terri Shaw, have a daughter in college and live in Oakland.

== See also ==
- List of African-American jurists
- List of LGBT jurists in the United States
- List of LGBT state supreme court justices in the United States

Legal offices
Preceded by Patricia Guerrero	Associate Justice of the California Supreme Court; 2023–present	Incumbent
