= Patricia Guerrero =

American judge (born 1971)

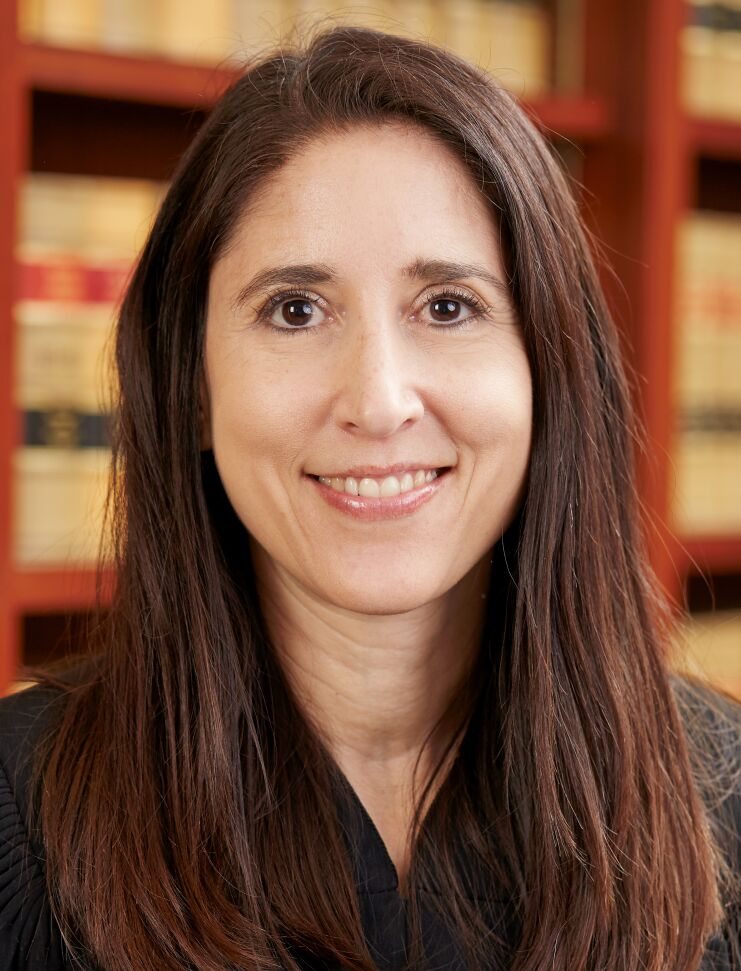
- Official portrait, 2023

29th Chief Justice of California
- Incumbent
- Assumed office January 2, 2023
- Appointed by: Gavin Newsom
- Preceded by: Tani Cantil-Sakauye

Associate Justice of the California Supreme Court
- In office March 28, 2022 – January 1, 2023
- Appointed by: Gavin Newsom
- Preceded by: Mariano-Florentino Cuéllar
- Succeeded by: Kelli Evans

Associate Justice of the California Court of Appeal for the Fourth Appellate District Division One
- In office December 14, 2017 – March 27, 2022
- Appointed by: Jerry Brown
- Preceded by: Alex McDonald
- Succeeded by: Julia C. Kelety

Judge of the San Diego County Superior Court
- In office May 21, 2013 – December 13, 2017
- Appointed by: Jerry Brown
- Preceded by: Gonzalo P. Curiel
- Succeeded by: William Wood

Personal details
- Born: December 7, 1971 (age 54) California, U.S.
- Party: Democratic
- Education: University of California, Berkeley (BA); Stanford University (JD)

Patricia Guerrero (born December 7, 1971) is an American judge who is the 29th chief justice of California and served as an associate justice of the Supreme Court of California from March 2022 through December 2022. Guerrero was previously an associate justice of the California Court of Appeal for the Fourth District, Division One from 2017 to 2022, a judge on the San Diego County Superior Court from 2013 to 2017 and an assistant U.S. attorney in the United States District Court for the Southern District of California from 2002 to 2003. On August 10, 2022, Guerrero was nominated to the position of chief justice of California by Governor Gavin Newsom. She is a Democrat.

== Education ==
Guerrero was born in California to parents from Mexico. She was raised in the Imperial Valley. At the age of 16, Guerrero worked at a grocery store. Guerrero graduated from the University of California, Berkeley in 1994. She earned a Juris Doctor from Stanford Law School in 1997.

== Career ==
Guerrero performed pro bono work as a member of the Immigration Justice Project advisory board. From 2002 to 2003, Guerrero served as an assistant U.S. attorney in the Southern District of California. She joined the law firm of Latham & Watkins as an associate and was promoted to partner in 2006.

== Judicial service ==
In 2013, Guerrero became a judge on the San Diego County Superior Court and served as the supervising judge for its family law division in 2017. Later in 2017, she became an appellate justice on the Court of Appeal for the Fourth District, Division One, the state intermediate appellate court with jurisdiction over appeals from San Diego County and Imperial County.

In February 2022, Guerrero was nominated by California Governor Gavin Newsom to replace Associate Justice Mariano-Florentino Cuéllar on the Supreme Court of California, after Cuéllar stepped down to become president of the Carnegie Endowment for International Peace. Guerrero was approved by a 3-0 vote of the Commission on Judicial Appointments on March 22, 2022 and is the first Latina to serve on the Supreme Court of California. On August 10, 2022, Governor Newsom nominated Guerrero to serve as the chief justice of California. On August 26, she was confirmed by the Commission on Judicial Appointments. As of November 11, 2022, following the 2022 election, she was retained by California voters to be elevated as the chief justice with 70% of an affirmative vote. She was sworn in as chief justice on January 2, 2023.

Justice Guerrero gave the 2025 State of the Judiciary address to the California Legislature reaffirming the CA judicial branch's commitment to uphold its responsibilities to serve the public in a pursuit to justice for all Californians.

Guerrero also serves as the chair of the California Supreme Court Historical Society, a non-profit organization that primarily conducts historical research on the California Supreme Court.

Legal offices
Preceded by Mariano-Florentino Cuéllar	Associate Justice of the California Supreme Court; 2022–2023	Succeeded by Kelli Evans
Preceded by Tani Cantil-Sakauye	Chief Justice of California; 2023–present	Incumbent
