= Tani Cantil-Sakauye =

American judge (born 1959)

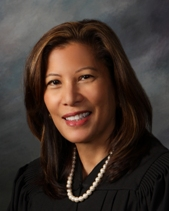

28th Chief Justice of California
- In office January 3, 2011 – January 1, 2023
- Appointed by: Arnold Schwarzenegger
- Preceded by: Ronald M. George
- Succeeded by: Patricia Guerrero

Personal details
- Born: Tani Gorre Cantil; October 19, 1959 (age 67) Sacramento, California, U.S.
- Party: Republican (before 2018); Independent (2018–present)
- Spouse: Mark Sakauye
- Children: 2
- Education: Sacramento City College (AA); University of California, Davis (BA, JD)

Tani Gorre Cantil-Sakauye (née Cantil; born October 19, 1959) is an American lawyer and jurist who was the 28th Chief Justice of California and is the president/CEO of the Public Policy Institute of California. She was nominated by Governor Arnold Schwarzenegger to serve as chief justice on July 22, 2010, and retained in office by California voters on November 2, 2010, she was sworn in on January 3, 2011 as California's first Filipino and first woman of color to serve as California's Chief Justice. Prior to her appointment as chief justice, Cantil-Sakauye had served in judicial offices on California's appellate and trial courts. On July 27, 2022, she announced she would retire and not run for another 12 year term on the court in November and stepped down on January 1, 2023, leaving Governor Newsom to appoint her replacement. On September 28, 2022, the Public Policy Institute of California announced that Cantil-Sakauye would become its president and chief executive officer, effective January 2023. In September 2023, the Judicial Council of California voted unanimously to name the new Sacramento County courthouse after Cantil-Sakauye.

== Early life and education ==
Born in Sacramento, California, as Tani Gorre Cantil, she was raised in the Land Park neighborhood of Sacramento. In 1977, she earned her high school diploma from C. K. McClatchy High School, and in 1978 her Associate of Arts from Sacramento City College, where she played competitive tennis and won awards in debate. In 1980, she graduated with a Bachelor of Arts degree from the University of California, Davis. In 1984, she received her Juris Doctor degree from UC Davis School of Law. Cantil-Sakauye is of mixed descent. Her Hawaii-born father, Clarence, was of Filipino and Portuguese ancestry, while her mother, Mary Gorre, was Filipino.

== Legal career ==
Upon graduation from law school in 1984, Cantil was unable to find a job in law, so she became a blackjack dealer in Reno, Nevada. At the time, the Sacramento County Public Defender's Office had refused to hire her because of her young age. Later that same year, Deputy District Attorney Russell Hom (a future Sacramento County Superior Court Judge) recruited Cantil to come to the Sacramento County District Attorney's Office.

In 1988, Cantil left the District Attorney's office to become a Deputy Legal Affairs Secretary to Governor George Deukmejian. The next year, Deukmejian appointed Cantil as a Deputy Legislative Secretary.

== Judicial career ==
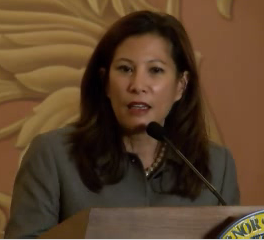
Cantil-Sakauye speaking at the swearing-in of Justice Goodwin Liu.

In 1990, Deukmejian appointed her as a Judge of the Sacramento Municipal Court. In 1997, Governor Pete Wilson appointed her as a Judge of the Sacramento County Superior Court. She served there until 2005, when Governor Arnold Schwarzenegger appointed her as an Associate Justice of the California Third District Court of Appeal to succeed Daniel Kolkey. In the November 7, 2006, election she was retained by the voters.

On July 21, 2010, Schwarzenegger nominated Cantil-Sakauye, at the time a Republican, to succeed retiring Chief Justice Ronald M. George on the California Supreme Court. On August 25, 2010, the three-member California Commission on Judicial Appointments unanimously approved her nomination as the next chief justice of California. In the November 2010 general elections, voters retained her for a 12-year term as chief justice.

During her time on the appellate court, Cantil-Sakauye has served as: a member of the Judicial Council, where she was vice chair of the Rules and Projects Committee; chair of the Advisory Committee on Financial Accountability and Efficiency for the Judicial Branch; co-chair of the Judicial Recruitment and Retention Working Group; and a member of the California Commission on Impartial Courts. She has served as President of the Anthony M. Kennedy American Inns of Court, an organization promoting civility, ethics, and professionalism in the practice of law. Beginning in 2007, she also served as a Special Master, selected by the Supreme Court to hear disciplinary proceedings before the Commission on Judicial Performance.

As Chief Justice, Cantil-Sakauye has pursued a number of policy initiatives. These include bail reform and decriminalizing minor traffic offenses, improved funding for courts and the bar, and civil discourse education for students. Finally, she has argued why she feels it is important that U.S. Immigration and Customs Enforcement not make arrests at state courthouses.

On July 27, 2022, Cantil-Sakauye announced she will retire at the end of her term on January 1, 2023.

=== Bail reform ===
In 2016, Cantil-Sakauye led the effort at bail reform and to reclassify minor traffic infractions as civil instead of criminal to promote fairness of the law. In March 2016, she outlined the scope of her initiative in a speech. In January 2017, she reiterated her concern of the impact of bail on those who cannot afford to pay. In June 2017, a reform bill progressed in the California State Assembly. However, in July 2017 critics expressed concern that the current bail system best serves the goal of ensuring court attendance. In August 2017, a settlement in Solano County, California, promised a degree of reform. Also in August 2017, the State Legislature declined to address in the current session the broader reform sought by the chief justice.

On August 28, 2018, Governor Brown signed into law a "no cash" bail bill, SB10. The bail reform act reflected advice from the Chief Justice's bail reduction task force. Bail bond business owners critical of the new law contend the state will struggle to replace their services.

=== Court and bar funding ===
In 2017, Cantil-Sakauye advocated for additional court funding. In July 2017, she explained that a history of inadequate funding has compromised services to the public, and in San Francisco has led to cuts at the courthouse. However, the Legislature has so far failed to provide the sought after increase in funding for the courts.

In September 2016, Cantil-Sakauye addressed the related matter of funding for the State Bar of California. In October and November 2016, a legislative stalemate led to a compromise budget for the Bar.

=== Civil discourse education ===
In 2012, Cantil-Sakauye launched an initiative, called "Power of Democracy," to support civil discourse education for students, and to emphasize the importance of jury trials as a matter of civics.

=== Immigration agents at courthouses ===
In March 2017, Cantil-Sakauye cautioned about the unintended consequences of arrests of undocumented immigrants by federal agents at California state courthouses. She has stated her concern that victims of crime will avoid the police and testifying in trials if they fear arrest at the courthouse. This would undermine the law enforcement goal of protecting communities, a view echoed by other judges and prosecutors. In August 2018, she made a further statement opposing a recent set of arrests by ICE at state courthouses.

=== UC Berkeley enrollment freeze ===
In 2022, Canti-Sakauye upheld a lower-court order that forced UC Berkeley to cut its enrollment numbers after a group of Berkeley residents sued the university. The Berkeley residents claimed that UC Berkeley was violating the California Environmental Quality Act by expanding its enrollment numbers.

== Judicial legacy ==
Before her current roles, Cantil-Sakauye was the 28th Chief Justice of California (2011–2022). She made history as the first person of color and the second woman to lead the state's judiciary. During her tenure, she was noted for her efforts in bail reform, decriminalizing minor traffic offenses, and protecting immigrants from federal enforcement at state courthouses.

== Post-judicial career ==
On September 28, 2022, the Public Policy Institute of California announced that Cantil-Sakauye would become its president and chief executive officer, effective January 1, 2023. She also serves as a Neutral Mediator and Arbitrator with ADR Services, Inc.

On September 19, 2023, it was announced that the Sacramento Superior Court's new downtown courthouse would be named after Cantil-Sakauye.

== Personal life ==
In 1994, she married Mark Sakauye, a since-retired Sacramento Police Department Japanese-American lieutenant. They have two daughters.

In December 2018, Cantil-Sakauye left the Republican Party and registered as a No Party Preference voter. She cited the confirmation of Justice Brett Kavanaugh and an increasing discomfort with the direction of the GOP as reasons.

== See also ==
- List of Asian American jurists
- List of justices of the Supreme Court of California

== Videos ==
- California chief justice afraid courthouse immigrations raids 'will be the end of justice' (video 1:03 mins). Sacramento Bee. March 27, 2017.
- California's Chief Justice tells ICE to stay out of courtrooms (video 1:12 mins). Sacramento Bee. August 22, 2017.
- Appearances on C-SPAN

Legal offices
Preceded by Ronald M. George	Chief Justice of the California Supreme Court; 2011–2023	Succeeded by Patricia Guerrero
