= Goodwin Liu =

American judge (born 1970)

- 劉弘威
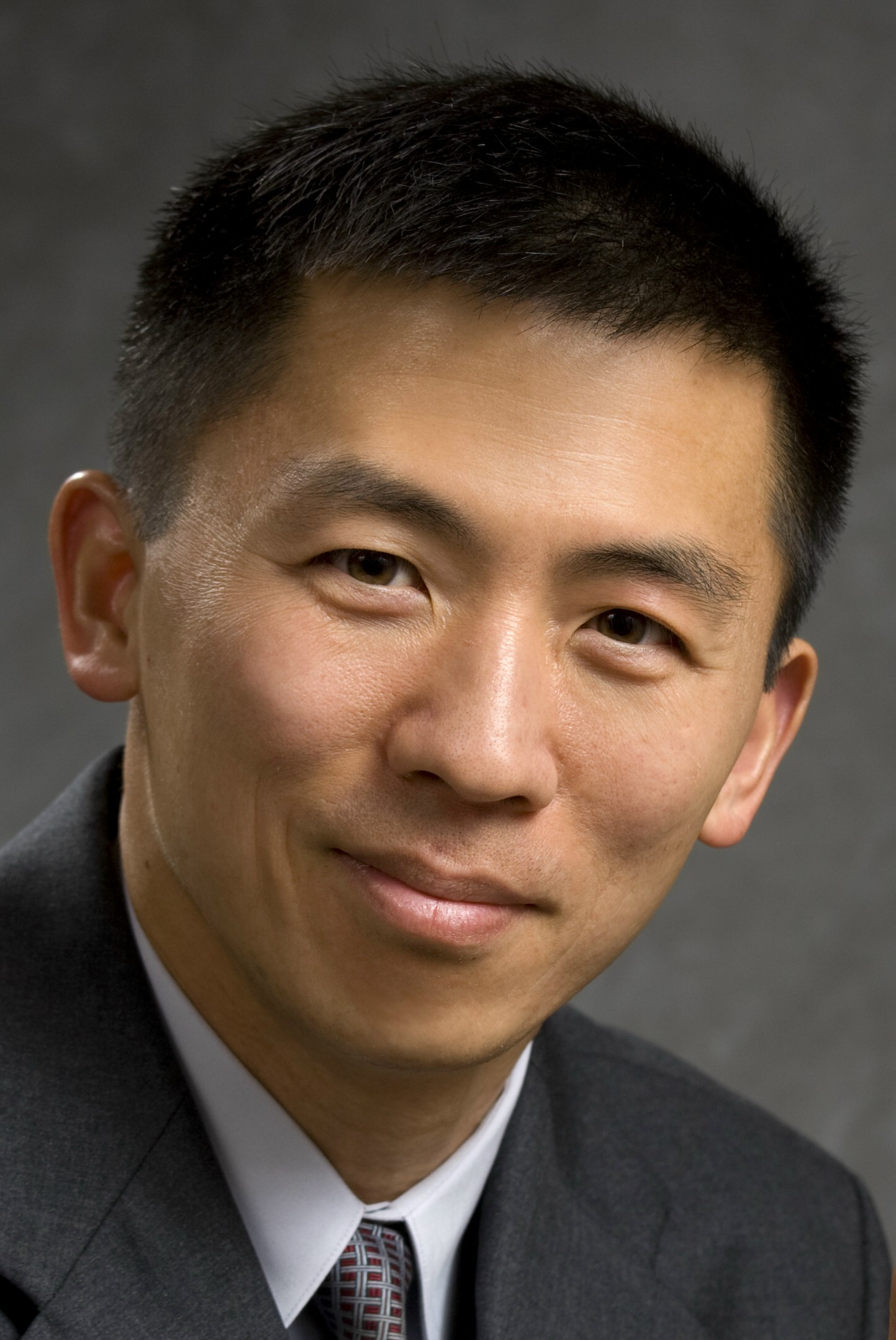
- Liu in 2010

Associate Justice of the California Supreme Court
- Incumbent
- Assumed office September 1, 2011
- Appointed by: Jerry Brown
- Preceded by: Carlos Moreno

Personal details
- Born: Goodwin Hon Liu; October 19, 1970 (age 55) Augusta, Georgia, U.S.
- Party: Democratic
- Spouse: Ann O'Leary (m. 2002; sep. 2016)
- Domestic partner: Jane Kim (2016–present)
- Education: Stanford University (BS); Lady Margaret Hall, Oxford (MPhil); Yale University (JD)

Chinese name
- Traditional Chinese: 劉弘威
- Simplified Chinese: 刘弘威
Transcriptions
Standard Mandarin
- Hanyu Pinyin: Liú Hóngwēi
- Bopomofo: ㄌㄧㄡˊㄏㄨㄥˊㄨㄟ
Southern Min
- Hokkien POJ: Lâu Hông-ui

Goodwin Hon Liu (Chinese: 劉弘威; pinyin: Liú Hóngwēi; born October 19, 1970) is an American jurist who has served as an associate justice of the Supreme Court of California since 2011. Before his appointment by Governor Jerry Brown, he was a professor of law and associate dean at the University of California, Berkeley. As of 2025, Liu is the S. William Green Visiting Professor of Public Law at Harvard Law School.

The son of Taiwanese American immigrants, Liu graduated from Stanford University and earned a master's degree from the University of Oxford as a Rhodes Scholar. After graduating from Yale Law School, he served as a law clerk to Judge David Tatel and Justice Ruth Bader Ginsburg. On February 24, 2010, President Barack Obama nominated Liu to fill a vacancy on the U.S. Court of Appeals for the Ninth Circuit. For more than a year, Liu's nomination was delayed amid significant opposition from Republicans in the U.S. Senate. On May 19, 2011, the Senate failed to invoke cloture on Liu's nomination with the necessary supermajority in a 52–43 vote, and on May 25, 2011, Liu informed President Obama that he was withdrawing his name from consideration to the seat on the Ninth Circuit.

On July 26, 2011, Governor Jerry Brown nominated Liu to a seat on the Supreme Court of California, succeeding Associate Justice Carlos R. Moreno. Three days later, President Obama formally notified the Senate that he was withdrawing Liu's nomination for the federal Ninth Circuit Court of Appeals. Liu was sworn into the California Supreme Court on September 1, 2011.

== Early life and education ==
Liu was born in Augusta, Georgia, to a Taiwanese American family. His parents, Wen-Pen (劉文彬) and Yang-Ching Liu (蔡洋清), were Taiwanese doctors who immigrated to the United States from Taiwan as part of a program that recruited physicians in primary care to practice in rural areas. His older brother, Kingsway, is also a doctor. When Goodwin was three years old, the family moved to rural Clewiston, Florida, and he learned English for the first time while attending school there. (Note: Liu did not know how to speak English until kindergarten.) In 1977, they relocated to Sacramento, California, where he attended public schools. Liu performed well academically and joined the Cub Scouts in fourth grade.

Due to having a limited proficiency in English, Liu spent nights studying dictionaries to increase his vocabulary for the SAT. He was educated at Sacramento's Rio Americano High School and became the captain of its tennis team, ultimately graduating in 1985 at age 15 as valedictorian of his high school class. During his junior year of high school, he was mentored by state representative Bob Matsui, who sponsored Liu to be a page of the United States House of Representatives. After winning a statewide science competition at age 16, Liu was selected by California governor George Deukmejian to enroll in a special program at Lawrence Berkeley National Laboratory.

After high school, Liu studied biology at Stanford University with the intent to enter medical school. He received multiple distinguished awards as an undergraduate, (Note: Stanford awarded Liu its Lloyd W. Dinkelspiel Award for Outstanding Service to Undergraduate Education, the James W. Lyons Dean's Award for Service, the Booth prize for Excellence in Writing, the Walter Vincenti prize, a David Starr Jordan Scholarship, and the university's President's Award for Academic Excellence. The Dinkelspiel Award is the university’s highest award for undergraduate service.) was elected co-president of the student body, and worked as a reporter for The Stanford Daily. While reporting on hate speech codes for the school newspaper as a freshman, he met Stanford Law professor Gerald Gunther; Liu recalled that, during one meeting, Gunther "talked about Nazism. He talked about societies that are far less free than ours. That was an amazing experience." During his senior year in college, Liu was a student leader at the Haas School of Business working with Stanford president Donald Kennedy.

Liu graduated from Stanford with a Bachelor of Science (B.S.) in biology in 1991 and was elected to Phi Beta Kappa. He was admitted to Harvard Medical School and the UCSF School of Medicine. A year earlier, however, Kennedy personally recommended Liu for a Rhodes Scholarship for overseas study in England at Oxford University. After winning the scholarship, Liu decided to defer his enrollment into medical school.

As a Rhodes Scholar, Liu initially entered Lady Margaret Hall, Oxford, to begin a doctoral program in immunology, but decided against a medical career because "it was too far removed from the things that really moved me." He studied philosophy instead, graduating with a Master of Philosophy (M.Phil.) in psychology, philosophy and physiology in 1993. Liu then returned to the United States to attend Yale Law School, where he became an editor of The Yale Law Journal and received his Juris Doctor (J.D.) degree in 1998. In law school, he was a summer associate at the law firm of Covington & Burling and was a teaching assistant to professors Owen Fiss and Drew Days for civil procedure.

== Career ==
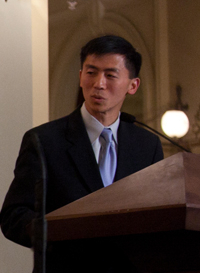
Liu speaking

After graduating from Yale, Liu served as a law clerk for Judge David S. Tatel of the U.S. Court of Appeals for the D.C. Circuit in 1998–1999, who Liu described as "without a doubt the most important mentor I’ve had in my legal career." He then became a special assistant to the deputy secretary of the U.S. Department of Education for a year and worked as a contract attorney at Nixon Peabody.

Liu clerked for Justice Ruth Bader Ginsburg of the U.S. Supreme Court, where among other things, he contributed a draft to her dissent in Bush v. Gore. He also was a senior program officer for higher education at the Corporation for National Service (AmeriCorps). He is also a former chair of the board of directors of the American Constitution Society.

He was a professor at University of California, Berkeley. He was elected to the American Law Institute in May 2008 and was elected to the ALI Council in May 2013. He currently serves as the chair of the ALI's committee on the Young Scholars Medal. He serves on the boards of the National Women's Law Center and the Alliance for Excellent Education.

=== Professorship ===
He took a job at the University of California, Berkeley School of Law, where he became Associate Dean and Professor of Law. In 2009 Liu was awarded the UC Berkeley Distinguished Teaching Award.

=== Nomination to the Ninth Circuit ===
So what's the lesson here? Is it that law students and young lawyers should be careful — careful about what you write, careful about what you say, careful about taking a position for fear of losing a future opportunity? Well, let me tell you, I have certainly said things, written things, that I later regretted. I have made mistakes I wish I could erase. We all have. But it would be wrong to conclude that the best way to go about life is to just play it safe.

— Goodwin Liu
American Constitution Society National Convention

On February 24, 2010, President Obama nominated Liu to a new judgeship seat on the Ninth Circuit created by the Court Security Improvement Act of 2007; which became effective on January 21, 2009. His nomination was filibustered by Republicans in the Senate and expired with the sine die adjournment of the 111th Congress. He was renominated to the same position on the first full day of the 112th Congress. On April 7, 2011, the Senate Judiciary Committee reported his nomination to the floor of the Senate by a party-line 10–8 vote.

However, Liu's nomination was harshly criticized by Senate Republicans for allegedly failing to disclose 117 of his more controversial writings and speeches. On April 6, 2010, Liu submitted the 117 requested items to the committee as a supplemental to the original questionnaire. The committee hearing had been postponed twice particularly due to Republican opposition to Liu's judicial qualifications and record. Liu defended his writings as a scholar by saying that "there's a clear difference between what things people write as scholars and how one would approach the role of a judge". On April 6, 2010, a letter was sent to the Senate Judiciary Committee Chairman Patrick Leahy by the seven committee Republicans to request a third postponement, which was subsequently rejected. Liu was also criticized for lack of trial-level experience. Prior to his nomination, Liu had not served as a judge and had argued only one case at the appellate court level as a lawyer.

Liu's criticism of Chief Justice John Roberts and especially his statement during Samuel Alito's Supreme Court nomination was targeted by Senate Republicans as proof of his lack of judicial temperament and partisanship. Liu later apologized and said that his words were "unduly harsh".

On May 17, 2011, Senator Harry Reid filed a cloture motion on Liu's nomination. On May 19, 2011, the Senate rejected cloture in a mostly party-line vote of 52–43, with all but one Democrat (Ben Nelson) voting in favor of cloture and all but one Republican (Lisa Murkowski) voting against. He became the first Obama judicial nominee to be successfully filibustered in the Senate. With the makeup of the Senate unlikely to change until after the 2012 election, Liu withdrew his name from consideration on May 25, 2011. On July 29, 2011, three days after California Governor Jerry Brown nominated Liu to a seat on the Supreme Court of California, President Obama formally notified the Senate that he was withdrawing Liu's nomination for the 9th Circuit. In a talk before The City Club of Cleveland on February 22, 2013, Liu commented that the confirmation process is "inherently a political process" and "the Constitution was designed to make it a political process." He noted, however, that the problem with the confirmation process is that it has become transformed into requiring 60 votes as opposed to a bare majority, which was not part of the Constitutional design.

=== California Supreme Court ===
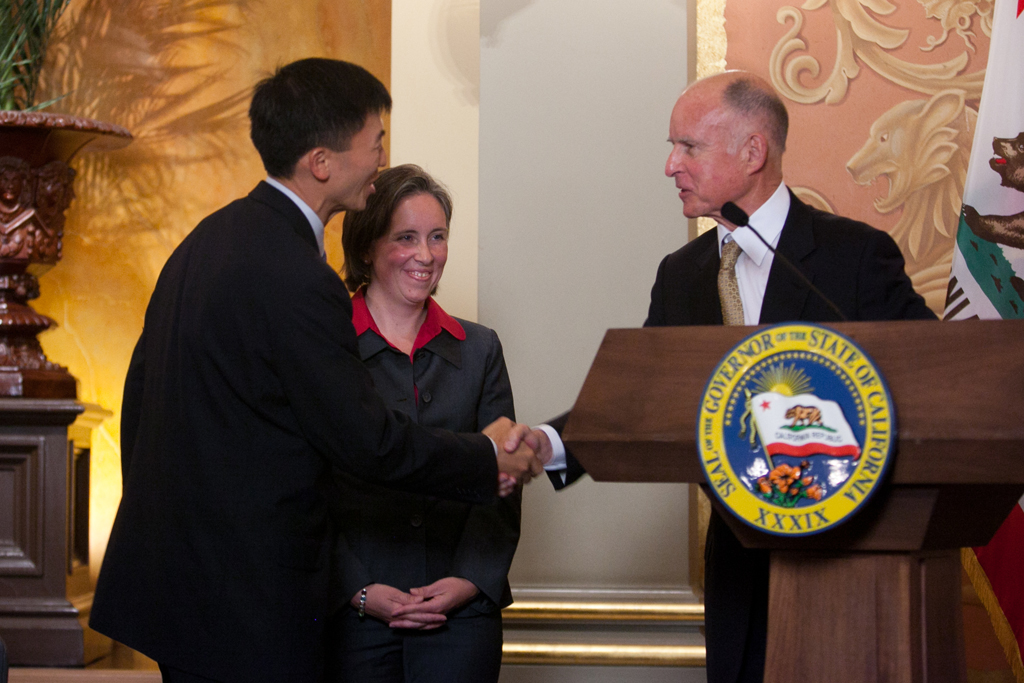
Justice Liu and his wife, Ann O'Leary, shaking hands with Governor Jerry Brown after his swearing-in ceremony.

On July 26, 2011, California Gov. Jerry Brown nominated Liu to a seat on the Supreme Court of California. In submitting his nomination, Brown said that "[Liu] is a nationally recognized expert on constitutional law and has experience in private practice, [in] government service and in the academic community. I know that he will be an outstanding addition to our state supreme court." Liu responded to his nomination with a prepared statement: "I'm deeply honored by Governor Brown's nomination and look forward to the opportunity to serve the people of California on our state's highest court."

On August 30, the state bar commission that screens all nominees gave Liu a "unanimously well qualified" rating, describing him as "brilliant, impartial, and with a work ethic second to none ... [h]e has an unwavering commitment to equal access to justice and will treat all litigants fairly, without regard to wealth or position in society." He was confirmed unanimously the next day by Chief Justice Tani Cantil-Sakauye, state Attorney General Kamala Harris, and Presiding Justice Joan Dempsey-Klein, the senior-most presiding justice serving on the California Court of Appeal. Ten witnesses testified in favor of his nomination and none testified against.

Liu was sworn in on September 1, 2011, and took the bench on September 6, sitting on a procedural issue regarding the controversial Perry v. Schwarzenegger case.

While the other justices employ five permanent staff as law clerks, Justice Liu has returned to the traditional use of recent law school graduates as one-year clerks.

As of November 11, 2022, following the 2022 election, he was retained by California voters to continue to serve as an associate justice with 69.2% of an affirmative vote.

==== Opinions ====
In his first year on the bench, Liu authored six decisions, all of them unanimous.

- Kirby v. Immoos Fire Protection, Inc.
- Dicon Fiberoptics, Inc. v. Franchise Tax Board
- United Teachers of Los Angeles v. Los Angeles Unified School Dist.
- Coito v. Superior Court
- National Paint & Coatings Assn., Inc. v. South Coast Air Quality Management Dist.
- Parks v. MBNA American Bank

He also authored the majority opinion in Apple v. Superior Court, where he ruled that online retailers can continue asking for credit card holder's information, such as telephone numbers and home addresses, when completing a transaction with a credit card. The complaint arose from the Song-Beverly Credit Card Act of 1971, which sought to protect consumer privacy when purchasing products in a store. Liu instead ruled for Apple, concluding that "because we cannot make a square peg fit a round hole, we must conclude that online transactions involving electronically downloadable products fall outside the coverage of the statute."

In 2015, Justice Liu joined in the California Supreme Court's unauthored opinion, In re Hong Yen Chang, which posthumously admitted Chang to the State Bar. Chang was denied admission to the bar by the court in 1890, due to the federal Chinese Exclusion Act. Justice Liu and the rest of the California Supreme Court abrogated the court's previous decision and held that "the discriminatory exclusion of Chang from the State Bar of California was a grievous wrong" that "denied Chang equal protection of the laws".

== Positions ==
Liu is socially liberal. He has written in favor of affirmative action, abortion rights, and same-sex marriage and has been critical of Bush-era waterboarding policy and the death penalty. In a 2008 article for the Stanford Law Review, Liu advocated a constitutional right to receive welfare. His positions are predominantly left-leaning; however, Liu has supported charter schools and government-funded vouchers for private schools, particularly if used as a tool to "promote racial diversity." Justice Liu has defended the California Supreme Court's practice of drafting its opinions before hearing oral arguments, as a gross mischaracterisation of its process.

Gerald Uelman, a professor and former dean of the University of Santa Clara School of Law, was impressed with Liu's work, saying "He displays a very independent streak. His opinions are very well thought out and well reasoned." Bob Egelko, a legal affairs reporter for the San Francisco Chronicle, agreed, saying that "his dissents come within the ideological boundaries of [the California Supreme Court], which is an institution that in general moves incrementally."

== Publications ==
Liu's recent work includes "Keeping Faith with the Constitution" (2009) (with Pamela S. Karlan and Christopher H. Schroeder); "Rethinking Constitutional Welfare Rights" in Stanford Law Review (2008); "History Will Be Heard: An Appraisal of the Seattle/Louisville Decision" in Harvard Law & Policy Review (2008); "Improving Title I Funding Equity Across States, Districts, and Schools," in Iowa Law Review (2008); "Seattle and Louisville" in California Law Review (2007); "Education, Equality, and National Citizenship" in Yale Law Journal (2006); and "Interstate Inequality in Educational Opportunity" in New York University Law Review (2006).

== Awards and memberships ==
In 2007, Liu's work won the Education Law Association's Steven S. Goldberg Award for Distinguished Scholarship in Education Law. In 2009, Liu won the UC Berkeley Distinguished Teaching Award. In 2020 he was elected to the American Philosophical Society.

== Personal life ==
Liu was married to Ann M. O'Leary, who was a senior policy adviser to the Hillary Clinton's 2016 presidential campaign. Liu and O'Leary had two children before announcing their separation in 2016. Liu had been rumored to be in a relationship with former San Francisco Supervisor Jane Kim, who was once his law student. Liu's father, Wenpen Liu, a medical doctor, is active in Taiwanese politics and the Taiwan independence movement, and is a main organizer in the Democratic Progressive Party overseas and head of the Sacramento office of the Formosan Association for Public Affairs.

== See also ==
- Barack Obama judicial appointment controversies
- Barack Obama Supreme Court candidates
- Joe Biden Supreme Court candidates
- List of Asian American jurists
- List of justices of the Supreme Court of California
- List of law clerks for the sixth seat of the Supreme Court of the United States

== Videos ==
- Appearances on C-SPAN

Legal offices
Preceded by Carlos Moreno	Associate Justice of the California Supreme Court; 2011–present	Incumbent
