= Supreme Court of California =

Highest judicial court in the U.S. state of California

Coordinates: 37.7806°N 122.4178°W

- Seal of the Supreme Court of California
- Interactive map of Supreme Court of California
- Established: 1849; 177 years ago
- Jurisdiction: California
- Location: San Francisco (Headquarters); Sacramento; Los Angeles
- Composition method: Gubernatorial nomination and confirmation by Chief Justice, Attorney General and a senior presiding judge of the Court of Appeal
- Authorised by: California Constitution
- Appeals to: Supreme Court of the United States (for matters involving U.S. federal law or the U.S. Constitution only)
- Judge term length: 12 years; renewable
- Number of positions: 7
- Website: supreme.courts.ca.gov

Chief Justice
- Currently: Patricia Guerrero
- Since: January 2, 2023
- Lead position ends: January 8, 2035

The Supreme Court of California is the highest and final court of appeals in the courts of the U.S. state of California. It is headquartered in San Francisco at the Earl Warren Building, but it regularly holds sessions in Los Angeles and Sacramento. Its decisions are binding on all other California state courts. Since 1850, the court has issued many influential decisions in a variety of areas including torts, property, civil and constitutional rights, and criminal law.

== Composition ==
Under the original 1849 California Constitution, the Court started with a chief justice and two associate justices. The Court was expanded to five justices in 1862. Under the current 1879 constitution, the Court expanded to six associate justices and one chief justice, for the current total of seven. The justices are appointed by the Governor of California and are subject to retention elections.

According to the California Constitution, to be considered for appointment, as with any California judge, a person must be an attorney admitted to practice in California or have served as a judge of a California court for 10 years immediately preceding the appointment.

Similar to the California Court of Appeals, the California Supreme Court fills vacancies by requiring approval from the Governor, two commissions, and the voters to select judges for 12-year terms. To fill a vacant position, the Governor must first submit a candidate's name to the Commission on Judicial Nominees Evaluation of the State Bar of California. The Commission on Judicial Nominees Evaluation (JNE) is the first official stage of review for the governor’s potential nominees. Established in 1979, the JNE was created in the wake of a controversial appointment by Lieutenant Governor Mike Curb, who was acting in the absence of Governor Jerry Brown. Lieutenant Governor Curb appointed a judge without the permission of the Bar or Governor Brown. This led to Governor Brown revoking the appointment and the California State Legislature creating Government Code Section 12011.5, requiring the JNE to review any governor-selected judicial candidates before they appear before the Commission on Judicial Appointments. Members of the JNE do not have to have previously practiced law to serve on the commission, but at least 80% of the commission must be currently practicing. There must also be at least one former judicial officer. These commission members work in small teams to investigate potential nominees within 90 days of the Governor’s decision.

Next, the Governor officially nominates the candidate, who must then be evaluated by the Commission on Judicial Appointments, which consists of the Chief Justice of California, the Attorney General of California, and a senior presiding justice of the California Courts of Appeal. The Commission holds a public hearing and if satisfied with the nominee's qualifications, confirms the nomination. The nominee can then immediately fill an existing vacancy, or replace a departing justice at the beginning of the next judicial term.

If a nominee is confirmed to fill a vacancy that arose partway through a judicial term, the justice must stand for retention during the next gubernatorial election. Voters then determine whether to retain the justice for the remainder of the judicial term. At the term's conclusion, justices must again undergo a statewide retention election for a full 12-year term. If a majority votes "no", the seat becomes vacant and may be filled by the Governor.

On the other hand, if a Justice chooses not to run for another term on the bench but still intends to finish their current term, the governor cannot immediately replace that justice. Instead, the governor only proceeds through the appointment process, and the nominee must wait until the end of the term of the retiring justice so that the nominee may be approved by voters.

California’s method of Supreme Court judicial selection is largely driven by gubernatorial appointment and voter retention, which is not the standard nationally. Several states, including Michigan, Texas, and Nevada, use contested elections with several candidates competing for a single seat. These systems are supported for maintaining more accountability among judges, though they have been criticized for potentially opening the door to corruption. Opponents of these elections argue that the financial donations necessary in campaigning can lead to favoritism and corruption among judges. There is no evidence of a significant relationship between campaign contributions and judicial decisions made by elected judges in Nevada or Texas, two states that use nonpartisan and partisan elections, respectively. However, in Michigan, where quasi-partisan judicial elections are used, there is evidence of such a relationship.

The electorate has occasionally exercised the power not to retain justices. Chief Justice Rose Bird and Associate Justices Cruz Reynoso and Joseph Grodin were staunchly opposed to capital punishment and were subsequently removed in the 1986 general election. Most notably, Chief Justice Bird was the target of a state-wide campaign to unseat her led by prominent Californian conservatives. These included the California Republican Party, the California District Attorney’s Association, and the Defeat Rose Bird organization. This coalition spent over $2 million in the year prior to the election in their coordinated campaign. While Chief Justice Bird had the support of hundreds of law professors, only about half of Sacramento County Bar Association lawyers felt the same, and about two-thirds of California’s lower court judges opposed her. She mostly faced widespread resistance among California voters because of her history with capital punishment, having reversed death penalty rulings on several occasions for procedural issues. Chief Justice Bird also dissented to previous decisions, arguing against striking anti-death penalty jurors for reducing accurate representation. She also faced public scrutiny for not extending California’s liability rules to drugs. While Chief Justice Bird’s supporters argued that her removal was an intimidation tactic that would harm judicial independence, they were ultimately unsuccessful as Chief Justice Bird lost her retention election. Newly reelected Governor George Deukmejian was then able to elevate Associate Justice Malcolm M. Lucas to Chief Justice and appoint three new associate justices (one to replace Lucas in his old post and two to replace Reynoso and Grodin).

=== Structure ===
Between 1879 and 1966, the court was divided by the state constitution into two three-justice panels, Department One and Department Two. The chief justice divided cases evenly between the panels and also decided which cases would be heard "in bank" (en banc) by the Court sitting as a whole. During the late 1920s, the court gradually transitioned to routinely hearing all appeals in bank, apart from two unusual exceptions in 1941 when it again tried to sit in departments. The 1966 formal abolition of the department system merely confirmed how the court had been actually operating for quite some time.

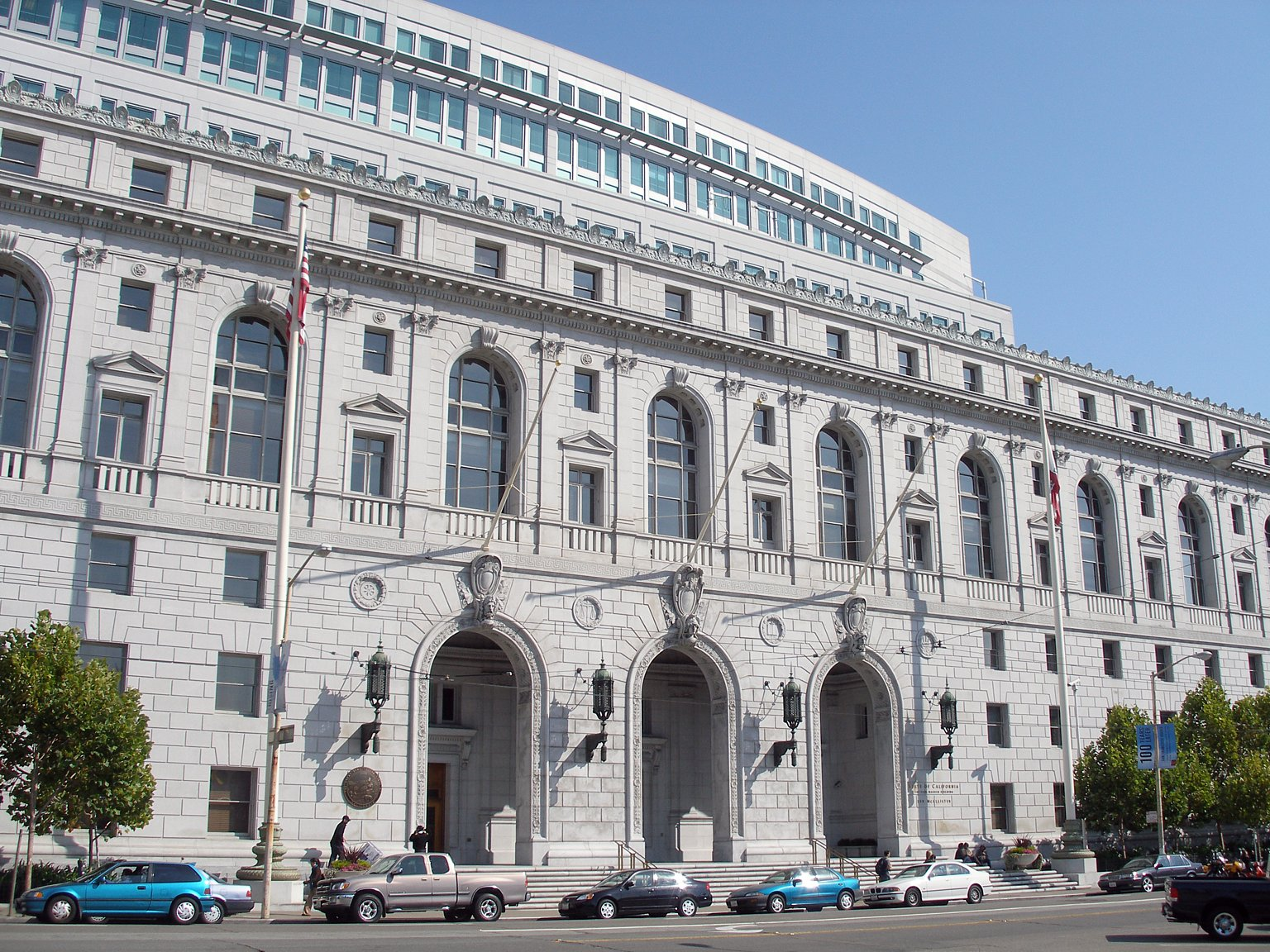
The Court's headquarters in San Francisco at the Earl Warren Building and Courthouse, which it shares with the Court of Appeal for the First District

Oral argument was mandatory only for in bank hearings of appeals, which meant that many appeals were decided by three-justice departments on the briefs alone. However, the state constitution required department decisions to be unanimous to produce a final judgment. Any dissent automatically triggered an in bank hearing. After a constitutional amendment in 1966, the Court currently sits in bank (all seven together) when hearing all appeals. When there is an open seat on the court, or if a justice recuses himself or herself on a given case, justices from the California Courts of Appeal are assigned by the chief justice to join the court for individual cases on a rotational basis.

The procedure for when all justices recuse themselves from a case has varied over time. For a 1992 case, the chief justice requested the presiding justice of a Court of Appeal district (different from the one where the case originated) to select six other Court of Appeal justices from his district, and they formed an acting Supreme Court for the purpose of deciding that one case. However, in a later case where all members of the Court recused themselves when Governor Schwarzenegger sought a writ of mandate (Schwarzenegger v. Court of Appeal (Epstein)), seven justices of the Courts of Appeal were selected based on the regular rotational basis, not from the same district, with the most senior one serving as the acting chief justice, and that acting supreme court eventually denied the writ petition. In a yet more recent case (Mallano v. Chiang) where all members of the Court recused themselves on a petition for review by retired Court of Appeal justices on a matter involving those justices' salaries (that apparently involved matters up to and including the 2016–2017 fiscal year), the Court ordered that six superior court judges be selected from the pool that took office after July 1, 2017, to serve as the substitute justices for the six sitting justices, with the senior judge among that group serving as the acting Chief Justice; that acting Supreme Court eventually denied the petition for review.

=== Membership ===
Name	Born	Start	Term ends	Appointer	Law school
Patricia Guerrero, Chief Justice	December 7, 1971 (age 54)	March 28, 2022 (Note: Took office as Chief Justice on January 2, 2023 after being elevated by Governor Newsom.)	2034	Gavin Newsom (D)	Stanford
Carol Corrigan	August 16, 1948 (age 78)	January 4, 2006	2030	Arnold Schwarzenegger (R)	UC Hastings
Goodwin Liu	October 19, 1970 (age 56)	September 1, 2011	2034	Jerry Brown (D)	Yale
Leondra Kruger	July 28, 1976 (age 50)	January 5, 2015	2030	Jerry Brown (D)	Yale
Joshua Groban	August 15, 1973 (age 53)	January 3, 2019	2038	Jerry Brown (D)	Harvard
Kelli Evans	July 9, 1968 (age 58)	January 2, 2023	2038	Gavin Newsom (D)	UC Davis
Vacant		October 31, 2025	2028		

==== Vacancy and pending nomination ====
Vacator	Reason	Vacancy Date	Appointee	Announcement Date
Martin Jenkins	Resignation	October 31, 2025	Pending	TBD

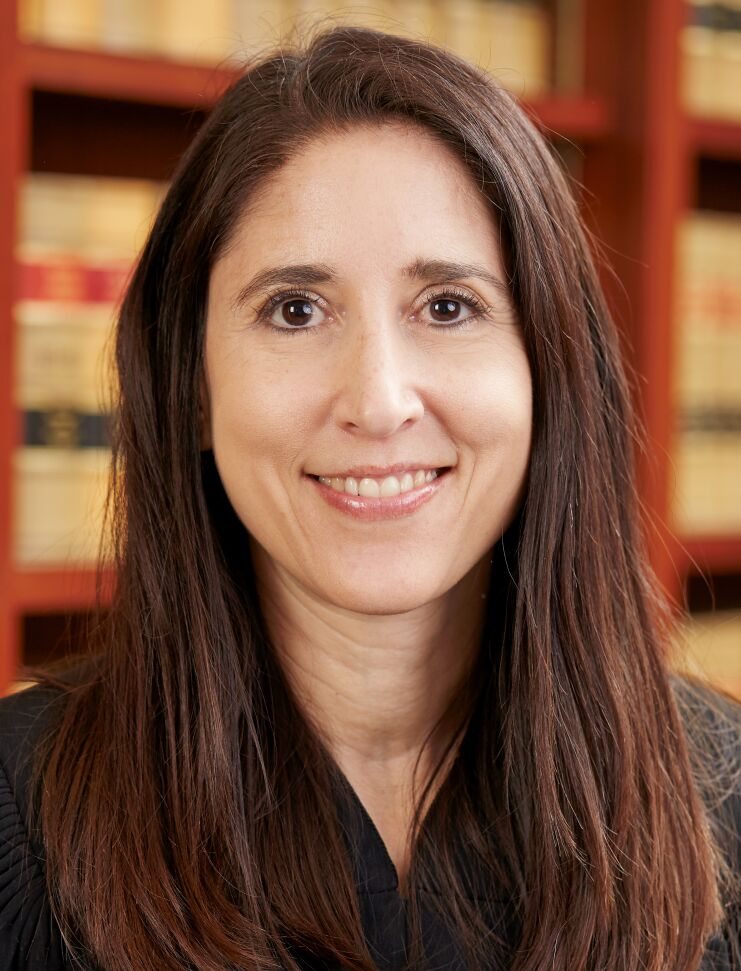
Chief Justice Patricia Guerrero

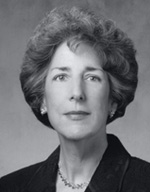
Associate Justice Carol Corrigan

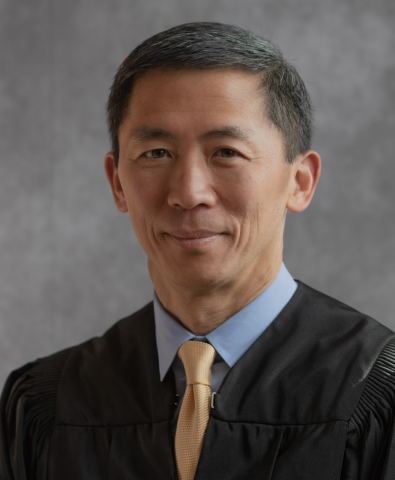
Associate Justice Goodwin Liu

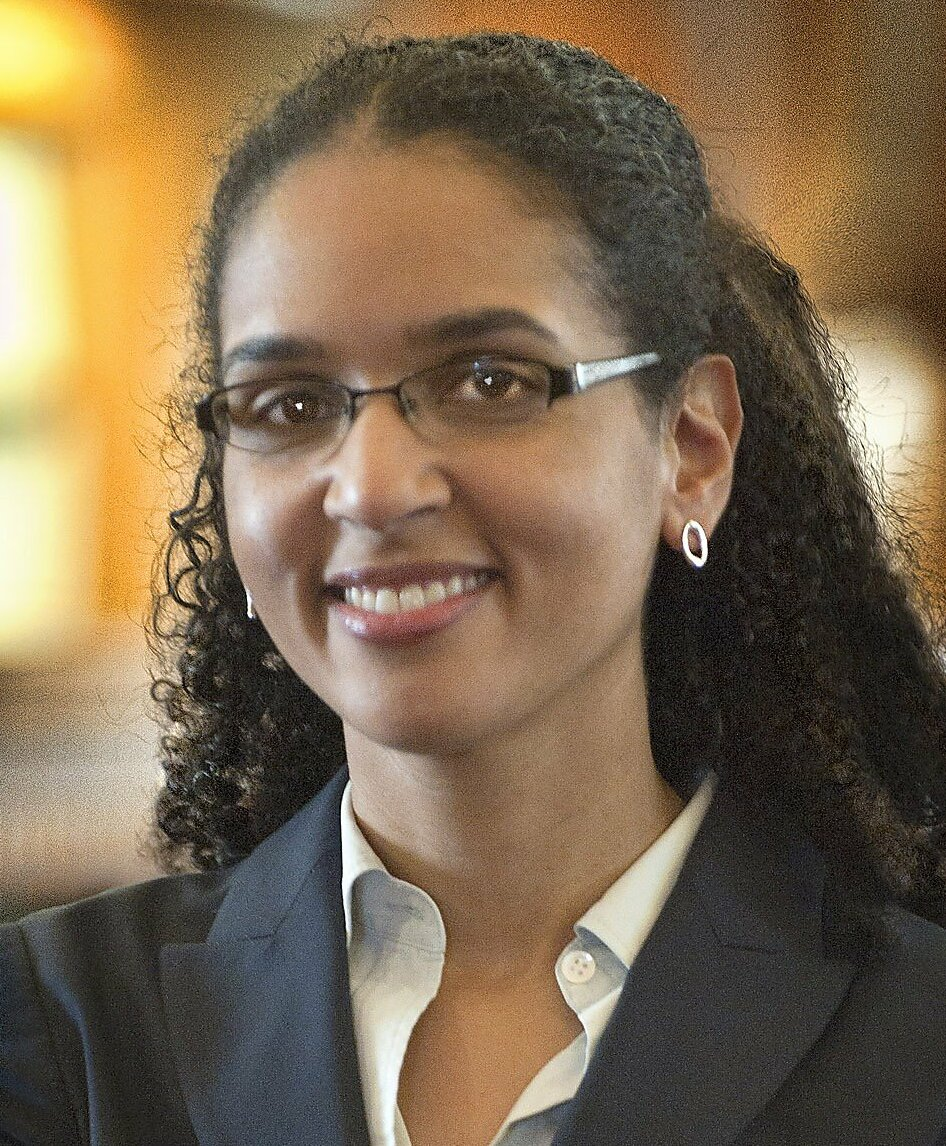
Associate Justice Leondra Kruger

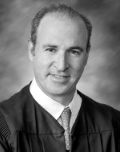
Associate Justice Joshua Groban

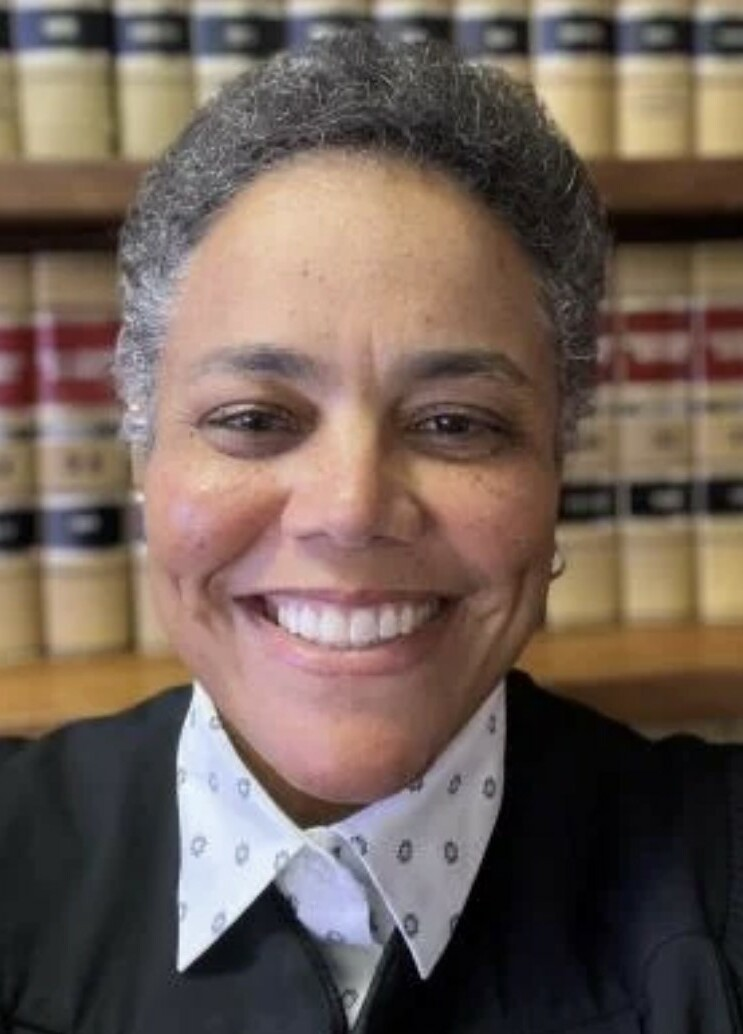
Associate Justice Kelli Evans

1 vacant seat

Five current justices were appointed by Democrats (Liu, Kruger, Groban, Guerrero, and Evans) and one by a Republican (Corrigan).

There are two African American (Kruger and Evans) justices, one East Asian American justice (Liu), two non-Hispanic white justices (Corrigan, Groban) and one Latina (Guerrero). One justice earned an undergraduate degree from a University of California school (Guerrero at Berkeley), four from private universities in California (Corrigan at Holy Names, and Liu, Groban and Evans at Stanford), and one from an out-of-state private university (Kruger at Harvard). Two justices earned their law degrees from a University of California law school (Corrigan at UC Law SF and Evans at Davis), one from a private California university (Guerrero at Stanford), and three from law schools at out-of-state private universities (Liu and Kruger at Yale, and Groban at Harvard).

The most recent addition to the court is Associate Justice Kelli Evans, who was sworn in on January 2, 2023, to replace then-Associate Justice Patricia Guerrero, who was elevated to chief justice. In 2023, Guerrero became the first Latina to serve as chief justice.

The court first had a female majority from 2011 to 2017. This majority had been achieved in 2011 after Republican Governor Arnold Schwarzenegger appointed Chief Justice Tani Cantil-Sakauye to the court, joining Justice Joyce L. Kennard (an appointee of Republican Governor George Deukmejian), Justice Kathryn Werdegar (appointed by Republican Governor Pete Wilson), and Justice Carol A. Corrigan (another Schwarzenegger appointee). When Kennard retired in 2014, Democratic Governor Jerry Brown preserved the female majority by appointing Leondra Kruger to succeed her; while this first female majority later ended with the 2017 retirement of Werdegar and appointment of Groban by Brown to succeed her, a second female majority was later established in 2022, upon the swearing-in of Guerrero to replace Mariano-Florentino Cuéllar.

== Operation ==
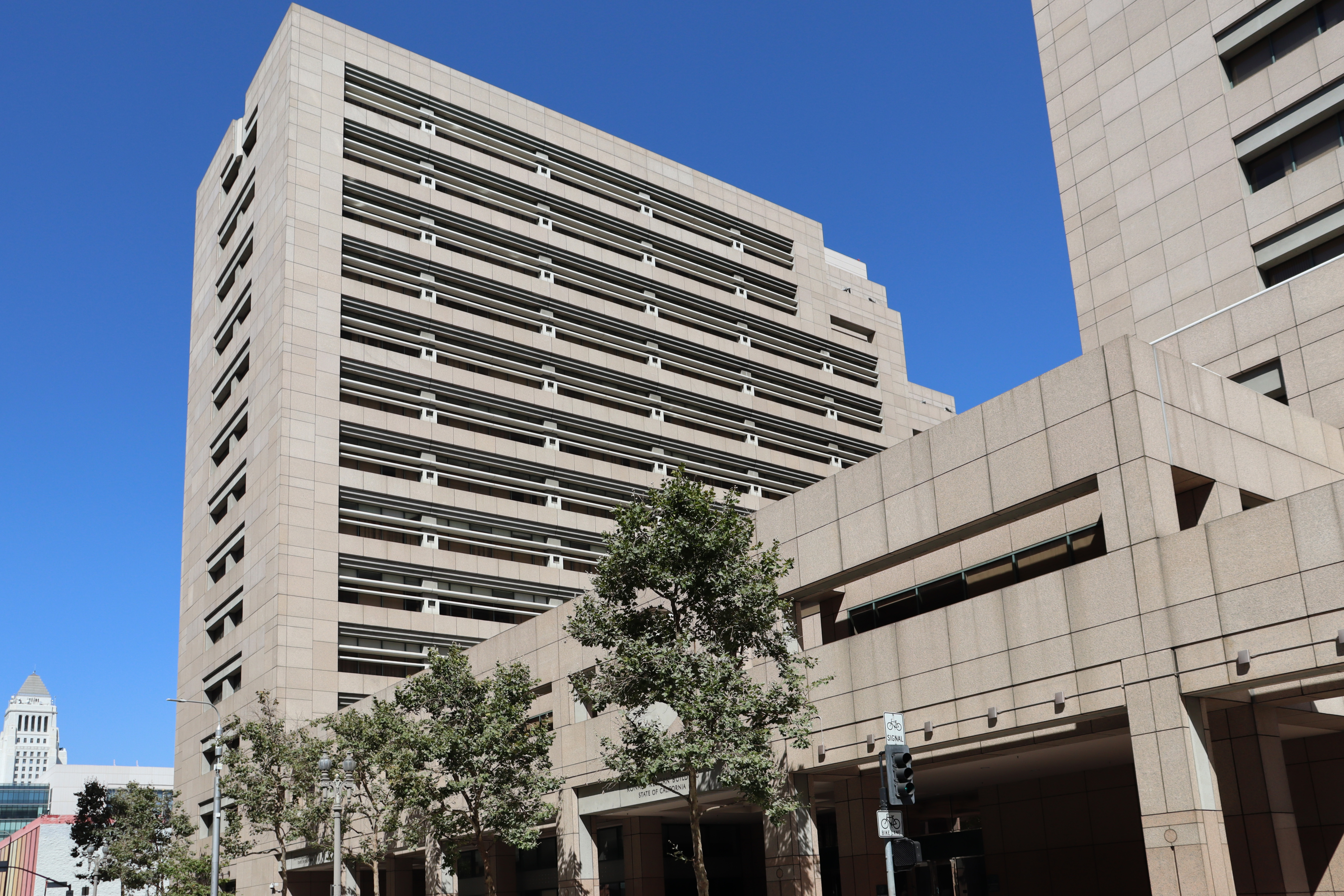
The Ronald Reagan State Building, the Supreme Court's branch office in Los Angeles, which it shares with the Court of Appeal for the Second District

=== Jurisdiction ===
The Constitution of California gives the Court mandatory and exclusive appellate jurisdiction in all cases imposing capital punishment in California, although the Court has sponsored a state constitutional amendment to allow it to assign death penalty appeals to the California Courts of Appeal. The Court has discretionary appellate jurisdiction over all cases reviewed by the Courts of Appeal; the latter were created by a 1904 constitutional amendment to relieve the Supreme Court of most of its workload so the Court could then focus on dealing with non-frivolous appeals that involved important issues of law.

According to research by Justice Goodwin Liu, each year the Court has averaged 5,200 petitions for writs of certiorari and 3,400 petitions for habeas corpus, plus 40 additional petitions from inmates already on death row. In an average year the Court will decide to hear 83 cases and will be required to hear appeals from 20 new inmates joining death row. Each week, the Court votes on 150 to 300 petitions, paying special attention to a staff-recommended "A list" as well as to certified questions from the United States Court of Appeals for the Ninth Circuit.

=== Internal procedure ===
The Court is open for business year-round (as opposed to operating only during scheduled "terms" as is commonplace in jurisdictions that observe the legal year). The Court hears oral argument at least one week per month, 10 months each year (except July and August). It has been headquartered in San Francisco since 1874. Since 1878, it has regularly heard oral argument each year at San Francisco (four months), Los Angeles (four months), and Sacramento (two months).

According to Justice Liu, when a case is granted review, the Chief Justice assigns the case to a justice, who, after the parties finish briefing, then prepares a draft opinion. Each justice writes a preliminary response to the draft opinion, and if the assigned justice is in the minority, she may ask the Chief Justice to reassign the case to someone in the majority. The Court then hears oral arguments and, immediately afterwards, meet alone to vote. The California Constitution requires suspension of the justices' salaries if the Court fails to then file a decision within 90 days. The Court issues unanimous opinions in 77% of cases, compared to 43% by the Supreme Court of the United States.

Throughout the year (including July and August), the justices have a conference every Wednesday the Court is not hearing oral argument, with the exception of the last week, respectively, of November and December (Thanksgiving and New Year's). New opinions are published online on Monday and Thursday mornings at 10 a.m. Paper copies also become available through the clerk's office at that time.

The Court is one of the few U.S. courts apart from the U.S. Supreme Court that enjoys the privilege of having its opinions routinely published in three hardcover reporters. The Court's Reporter of Decisions contracts with a private publisher (currently LexisNexis) to publish the official reporter, California Reports, now in its fifth series; note that the series number changes whenever the publisher changes, although the most recent changeover to the fifth series did not involve a change in reporter. West publishes California decisions in both the California Reporter (in its second series) and the Pacific Reporter (in its third series). (The New York Court of Appeals opinions are similarly published in three reporters.)

Each justice has five assigned chambers attorneys. Since the late 1980s, the Court has turned away from the traditional use of law clerks, and has switched to permanent staff attorneys. Justices Goodwin Liu and Leondra Kruger, however, have returned to the traditional use of recent law school graduates as one-year clerks for some of their staff positions. The Court has about 85 staff attorneys, some of whom are attached to particular justices; the rest are shared as a central staff. The advantage to this system is that the reduced turnover of staff attorneys (versus the traditional system of rotating through new law clerks every year) has improved the efficiency of the court in dealing with complex cases, particularly death penalty cases.

During its first half-century of operation, the Court struggled to keep up with its soaring caseload and very frequently fell behind, until the California Courts of Appeal were created in 1904. This resulted in provisions in the 1879 Constitution requiring the Court to decide all cases in writing with reasons given (to get rid of minor cases, it had often given summary dispositions with no reasons given) and requiring California judges to certify in writing every month that no matter submitted for consideration had been outstanding for more than 90 days, or else they will not be paid. To comply with the latter provision, the Court does not schedule oral argument until the justices and their staff attorneys have already studied the briefs, formulated their respective positions, and circulated draft opinions. Then, after the matter is formally "argued and submitted" before the Court, the justices can polish and file their opinions well before reaching the 90-day deadline. This differs sharply from the practice in all other federal and state appellate courts, where judges can schedule oral argument not long after written briefing is finished, but then may take many months (or even a year) after oral argument to file their opinions.

==== Historical procedure ====
In March 1885, the state legislature authorized the creation of the Supreme Court Commission to help with the Court's overwhelming backlog of pending appeals. The justices were initially allowed to hire three commissioners. Since oral argument was not mandatory except for in bank hearings of appeals, the justices began to assign cases to the commissioners which could likely be resolved on the briefs alone. The number of commissioners was expanded in five in 1889.

In retrospect, the commissioners can be seen as an important precursor of the law clerks and staff attorneys which the Court began to hire in the 1930s. In contrast to modern practice, where appellate justices are expected to take ownership of the opinions to which they sign their names and staff members are mere ghostwriters, the commissioners openly signed their opinions. Each of the approximately 4,400 appeals (3,700 reported, 700 unreported) handled by the commissioners was resolved by an opinion signed by one commissioner with the concurrence of two others. The opinions always ended in a recommended disposition, such as: "We find no error in the record and the judgment should be affirmed." Originally, this was followed by a one-line unsigned per curiam statement in the name of "The Court," such as: "For the reasons given in the foregoing opinion the judgment is affirmed." Starting in 1892, the three justices who reviewed and summarily adopted each commissioners' opinion began to also sign their names.

The commissioners were only partially successful in reducing the chronic backlog. The commission was also subject to heavy criticism as an unelected "auxiliary court". Attorneys who enjoyed appellate work but had difficulty holding onto judicial seats in partisan elections repeatedly bounced back and forth between serving as elected justices and unelected commissioners. After two more decades of debate, the state legislature recognized that the state needed to establish intermediate appellate courts and referred the issue to the electorate. In November 1904, Senate Constitutional Amendment No. 2 was approved by the state's voters, which abolished the Supreme Court Commission and created the California Courts of Appeal. All five commissioners were promptly appointed in 1905 to serve among the original nine justices of the Courts of Appeal.

=== Publication of opinions ===
Except for one decade at its founding, the Court has never been required by constitutional or statutory law to publish all its opinions. The Court currently chooses to publish all opinions as a matter of public policy, as disclosed in rule 8.1105(a) of the California Rules of Court. The original California Constitution of 1849 authorized the Court to publish all opinions that it "may deem expedient," and the current California Constitution of 1879 authorizes the Court to publish all opinions that it "deems appropriate." In 1850, a statute was enacted directing the Supreme Court to publish opinions in all cases, but in 1855, the Court began to direct that some opinions should not be reported, and this procedure was retroactively approved by the legislature in an 1860 statute. Over 1,800 unreported opinions were filed by the Court over the next 25 years (which includes the 700 unreported opinions filed by the commissioners). The Pacific Reporter started to collect and publish the Court's unreported opinions at its launch in 1883, and then the Court gave in and switched back to publication of all opinions. A small group of lawyers later recovered and compiled all the unreported opinions filed by the Supreme Court and the Supreme Court Commission before that point, which were published in a separate seven-volume reporter called California Unreported Cases starting in 1913. Despite its name, those cases are citable as precedent.

== Ancillary responsibilities ==
The Court supervises the lower courts (including the trial-level California superior courts) through the Judicial Council of California and the California Commission on Judicial Performance, and also supervises California's legal profession through the State Bar of California. All lawyer admissions are done through recommendations of the State Bar, which then must be ratified by the Supreme Court, and attorney discipline is delegated to the State Bar Court of California (although suspensions longer than three years must be independently decided upon by the Court). California's bar is the largest in the U.S. with 210,000 members, of whom 160,000 are practicing. In 2018 and in 2023, the Court issued reform directives regarding corrupt practices within the State Bar of California.

The court, with the assistance of the Reporter of Decisions, publishes the California Style Manual for use by the California Courts of Appeal and the superior courts.

== Reputation ==
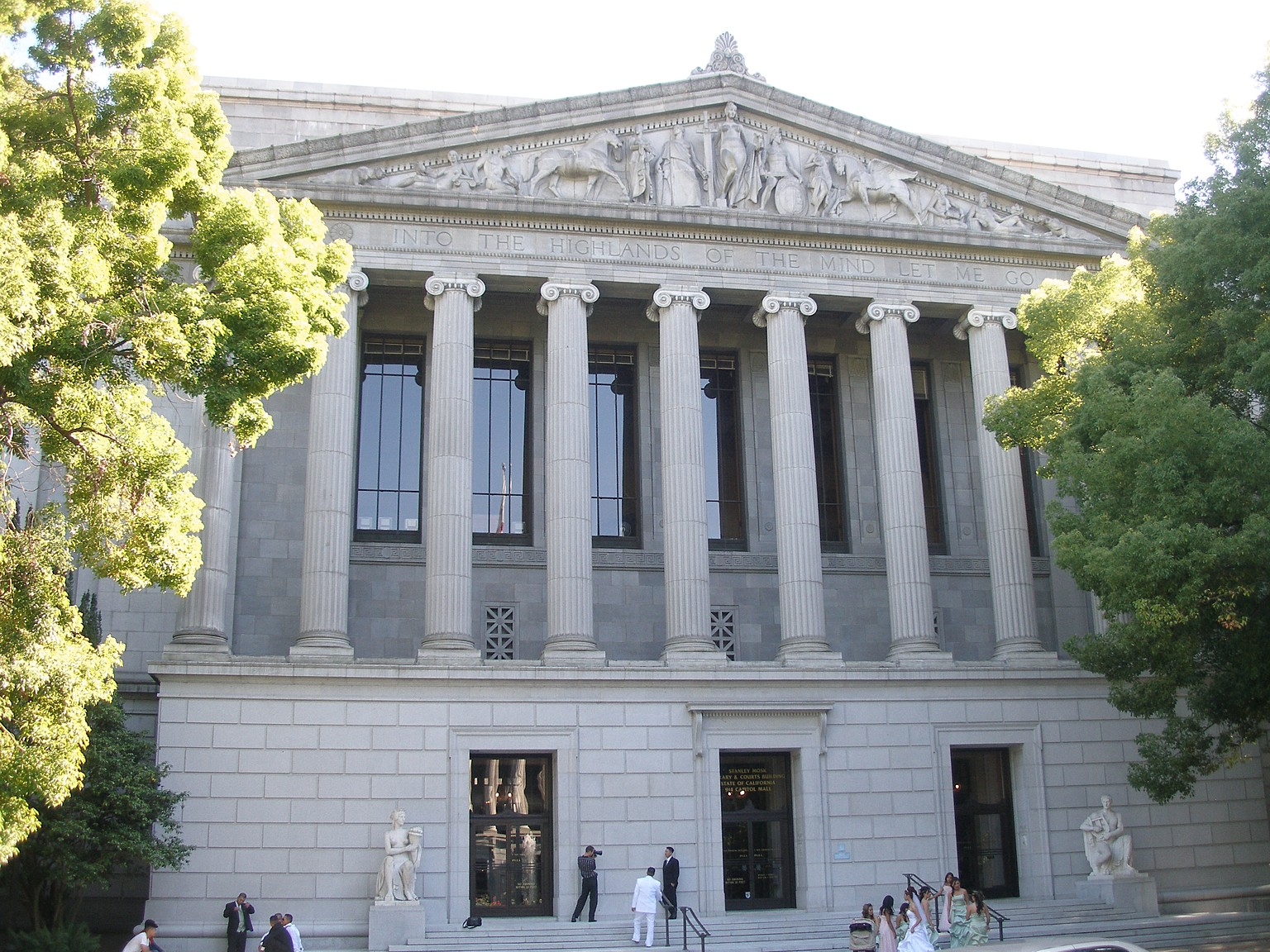
The Stanley Mosk Library and Courts Building, the Supreme Court's branch office in Sacramento, which it shares with the Court of Appeal for the Third District

As The Wall Street Journal stated, in 1972:

The state's high court over the past 20 years has won a reputation as perhaps the most innovative of the state judiciaries, setting precedents in areas of criminal justice, civil liberties, racial integration, and consumer protection that heavily influence other states and the federal bench.

Statistical analyses conducted by LexisNexis personnel at the Court's request indicate that the decisions of the Supreme Court of California are by far the most followed of any state supreme court in the United States. Between 1940 and 2005, 1,260 decisions of the Court were expressly followed by out-of-state courts (meaning that those courts expressly found the Court's reasoning persuasive and applied it to the cases before them).

Many important legal concepts have been pioneered or developed by the Court, including strict liability for defective products, fair procedure, negligent infliction of emotional distress, palimony, insurance bad faith, wrongful life, and market-share liability.

The major film studios in and around Hollywood and the high-tech firms of Silicon Valley both fall under the Court's jurisdiction. Thus, the Court has decided a number of cases by, between, and against such companies, as well as several cases involving Hollywood celebrities and high-tech executives.

The California Supreme Court and all lower California state courts use a different writing style and citation system from the federal courts and many other state courts. California citations have the year between the names of the parties and the reference to the case reporter, as opposed to the national standard (the Bluebook) of putting the year at the end. For example, the famous case Marvin v. Marvin, which established the standard for non-marital partners' ability to sue for their contributions to the partnership, is rendered Marvin v. Marvin (1976) 18 Cal.3d 660 [134 Cal.Rptr. 815, 557 P.2d 106] in California style, while it would be Marvin v. Marvin, 18 Cal. 3d 660, 557 P.2d 106, 134 Cal. Rptr. 815 (1976), in Bluebook style. The California citation style, however, has always been the norm of common law jurisdictions outside the United States, including England, Canada and Australia.

While the U.S. Supreme Court justices indicate the author of an opinion and who has "joined" the opinion at the start of the opinion, California justices always sign a majority opinion at the end, followed by "WE CONCUR," and then the names of the joining justices. California judges are traditionally not supposed to use certain ungrammatical terms in their opinions, which has led to embarrassing fights between judges and the editor of the state's official reporters. California has traditionally avoided the use of certain French and Latin phrases like en banc, certiorari, and mandamus, so California judges and attorneys use "in bank," "review," and "mandate" instead (though "in bank" has become quite rare after 1974).

Finally, the Court has the power to "depublish" opinions by the Courts of Appeal (as opposed to the federal practice of not publishing certain "unpublished" opinions at all in the federal case reporters). This means that even though the opinion has already been published in the official state reporters, it will be binding only upon the parties. Stare decisis does not apply, and any new rules articulated will not be applied in future cases. Similarly, the California Supreme Court has the power to "publish" opinions by the California Courts of Appeal which were initially not published.

== Important cases ==
The California Supreme Court has handed down important and influential decisions since 1850. Some of the most significant of these important and influential Court decisions are listed below in date ascending order. Most of the Court decisions that follow were landmark decisions that were among the first such decisions in the United States or the world.

- People v. Hall (1854): A case which held that Chinese persons may not testify against a white man, even if the white man is accused of murdering a Chinese person; effectively overturned by state law in 1873. The Hall case has been described as "containing some of the most offensive racial rhetoric to be found in the annals of California appellate jurisprudence" and "the worst statutory interpretation case in history."
- Houston v. Williams (1859): A leading case on the separation of powers under the California Constitution.
- Escola v. Coca-Cola Bottling Co. (1944): Then-Associate Justice Roger Traynor suggested in a now-famous concurring opinion that the Court should dispose of legal fictions like warranties and impose strict liability for defective products as a matter of public policy.
- Perez v. Sharp (1948): The Court overturned the statutory ban on interracial marriage as unconstitutional. Perez directly influenced the landmark U.S. Supreme Court decision on this issue, Loving v. Virginia (1967).
- Summers v. Tice (1948): The Court shifted the burden to the defense to disprove causation when it was clear that one of two defendants must have caused the plaintiff's injury, but it was not clear which one.
- Dillon v. Legg (1968): The Court radically expanded the tort of negligent infliction of emotional distress (NIED) beyond its traditional form, which historically had been limited to plaintiffs standing in the same "zone of danger" as a relative who was killed.
- Pacific Gas & E. Co. v. G. W. Drayage & Rigging Co., Inc. (1968): The Court held that parol evidence could be conditionally received by a trial court to determine if a contract was ambiguous when not ambiguous on its face. This decision has not been followed by the courts of any other state.
- Rowland v. Christian (1968): The Court abolished the old distinctions between different types of persons entering land and imposed a general duty of care in the context of the tort of negligence.
- People v. Belous (1969): The Court held the state's criminal statute prohibiting abortions to be unconstitutionally vague, in a 4–3 decision.
- People v. Anderson (1972): The Court relied upon the state constitutional clause prohibiting "cruel or unusual punishment" (note the difference from the federal Constitution's "cruel and unusual punishment" clause) to abolish capital punishment in California. The state electorate promptly overruled Anderson that same year with a popular initiative, Proposition 17, that kept the "cruel or unusual" clause but declared the death penalty to be neither cruel nor unusual.
- Pitchess v. Superior Court (1974): The Court held that criminal defendants have a right to access the arresting officer's personnel file when the defendant alleges in an affidavit that the officer used excessive force or lied about the circumstances of the arrest.
- Li v. Yellow Cab Co. (1975): The Court embraced comparative negligence as part of California tort law and rejected strict contributory negligence.
- Tarasoff v. Regents of the University of California (1976): The Court held that mental health professionals have a duty to protect individuals who are being threatened with bodily harm by a patient. The original 1974 decision mandated warning the threatened individual, but a 1976 rehearing resulted in a decision calling for a "duty to protect" the intended victim, which did not necessarily require that a potential victim be informed of the threat.
- Marvin v. Marvin (1976): The Court ruled in favor of the enforceability of non-marital relationship contracts, express or implied, to the extent that they are not founded purely upon meretricious sexual services. In other words, even though California does not recognize common law marriage, persons who cohabit for long periods of time and commingle their assets are allowed to plead and prove marriage-like contracts for support and division of property.
- Robins v. Pruneyard Shopping Center (1979): The Court found that the broad right to freedom of speech in the state constitution included an implied right to freedom of speech in private shopping centers. The U.S. Supreme Court in turn held that the state supreme court's decision did not amount to a "taking" of the shopping center under federal constitutional law.
- Sindell v. Abbott Laboratories (1980): The Court imposed market share liability on the makers of fungible hazardous products.
- Thing v. La Chusa (1989): The Court withdrew from the expansive form of NIED set forth in Dillon and imposed a rigid bright-line test for recovery in bystander NIED cases. The Thing decision included extensive dicta hostile to plaintiffs which more generally limited the scope of recovery for both the tort of negligence and emotional distress damages in California.
- Moore v. Regents of the University of California (1990): The Court held that patients do not have intellectual property rights in profits from medical discoveries made with their body parts.
- Wendland v. Wendland (2001): The Court held that in the absence of a legally recognized method of determining who should make medical decisions on the behalf of an incompetent patient, the constitutional right to life and right to privacy granted special protection to the incompetent person.
- Yount v. City of Sacramento (2008): The Court held that a criminal conviction does not limit an individual's right to bring civil action for deprivation of rights in cases of excessive use of force.
- In re Marriage Cases (2008): The Court held that sexual orientation is a protected class which requires strict scrutiny and under such scrutiny, laws prohibiting same-sex marriage are unconstitutional under the state constitution. The state electorate overturned the marriage portion of the decision that same year by enacting a popular initiative, Proposition 8, but left in place the discrimination protections.
- Silicon Valley Taxpayers' Assn., Inc. v. Santa Clara County Open Space Authority (2008): The Court unanimously held in a Proposition 218 ("Right to Vote on Taxes Act") case that courts must exercise their independent judgment in reviewing local agency legislative decisions adopting special assessments. The highly deferential standard of review before Proposition 218 became law was grounded in separation of powers. Because the constitutional provisions of Proposition 218 were of equal dignity to the separation of powers doctrine, it no longer justified allowing a local agency to usurp the judicial function of interpreting and applying the constitutional provisions that governed assessments under Proposition 218.
- People v. Diaz (2011): The Court held that the warrantless search of information in a cell phone was valid when incident to a lawful arrest. (The holding in Diaz was eventually repudiated by the United States Supreme Court in Riley v. California.)
- Dynamex v. Superior Court (2018): The Court abandoned the Control Test for the ABC Test and first ruled gig economy workers to be employees. Chief Justice Cantil-Sakauye penned this landmark decision. It led to AB5 which made it formalized and retroactive at the same time.

== Notable former justices ==
- Serranus Clinton Hastings, Chief Justice (1850–1852) (First Chief Justice, founded UC Law SF)
- Solomon Heydenfeldt, Associate Justice (1852–1857) (First Jewish justice to be elected by direct vote of the people)
- David S. Terry, Chief Justice (1857–1859) (Killed while attempting to assassinate his successor, Stephen Field)
- Stephen J. Field, Chief Justice (1859–1863) (Appointed by President Lincoln to the U.S. Supreme Court)
- Addison Niles, Associate Justice (1872–1880)
- Curtis D. Wilbur, Chief Justice (1923–1924) (Appointed by President Coolidge as U.S. Secretary of the Navy)
- Mathew Tobriner, Associate Justice (1962–1982)
- Roger J. Traynor, Chief Justice (1964–1970), Associate Justice (1940–1964) (Well-respected legal scholar; generally regarded as the greatest justice in the history of the Court)
- Stanley Mosk, Associate Justice (1964–2001) (Longest serving justice)
- Wiley W. Manuel, Associate Justice (1977–1981) (First African-American on the Court; well known for his pro bono work)
- Rose E. Bird, Chief Justice (1977–1987) (First woman appointed to the Court; only Chief Justice ever not to be retained by the electorate)
- Otto Kaus, Associate Justice (1981–1985)
- Allen Broussard, Associate Justice (1981–1991)
- Cruz Reynoso, Associate Justice (1982–1987) (First Latino on the Court)
- Janice Rogers Brown, Associate Justice (1996–2005) (Appointed by President G.W. Bush to the United States Court of Appeals for the District of Columbia Circuit)
- Ronald M. George, Chief Justice (1996–2011), Associate Justice (1991–1996)
- Mariano-Florentino Cuéllar, Associate Justice (2015–2021) (named president of the Carnegie Endowment for International Peace and chair of the board of the William and Flora Hewlett Foundation)
- Tani Cantil-Sakauye, Chief Justice (2011–2023) (first Asian American chief justice)

== List of chief justices ==
#	Name	Image	Term
1	Serranus Clinton Hastings		1849–1851
2	Henry A. Lyons		1852
3	Hugh C. Murray		1852–1857
4	David S. Terry		1857–1859
5	Stephen J. Field		1859–1863
6	W. W. Cope		1863–1864
7	Silas W. Sanderson		1864–1866
8	John Currey		1866–1868
9	Lorenzo Sawyer		1868–1870
10	Augustus L. Rhodes		1870–1872
11	Royal T. Sprague		1872
12	William T. Wallace		1872–1879
13	Robert F. Morrison		1879–1887
14	Niles Searls		1887–1889
15	William H. Beatty		1889–1914
16	Matt I. Sullivan		1914–1915
17	Frank M. Angellotti		1915–1921
18	Lucien Shaw		1921–1923
19	Curtis D. Wilbur		1923–1924
20	Louis W. Myers		1924–1926
21	William H. Waste		1926–1940
22	Phil S. Gibson		1940–1964
23	Roger J. Traynor		1964–1970
24	Donald R. Wright		1970–1977
25	Rose Elizabeth Bird		1977–1987
26	Malcolm M. Lucas		1987–1996
27	Ronald M. George		1996–2011
28	Tani Cantil-Sakauye		2011–2023
29	Patricia Guerrero		2023–present

== See also ==
- Judiciary of California
- Judicial Council of California
- Impeachment in California
- California Supreme Court Historical Society - a nonprofit organization that conducts historical research
