= Brooker (surname) =

Brooker is a surname. It may refer to:

== People ==
- Alex Brooker (born 1984), English journalist and presenter
- Barry Brooker (born 1941), Canadian gymnast
- Bertram Brooker (1888–1955), Canadian painter
- Bob Brooker (1926–1986), Australian rules footballer
- Charles Brooker, multiple people
- Chris Brooker (born 1986), English rugby union footballer
- Daphne Brooker (1927–2012), British model, costume designer and fashion professor
- Dawn Brooker (born 1959), British psychologist and professor
- Edward Brooker (1891–1948), Australian politician, 31st premier of Tasmania
- Frank Brooker (1875–1939), New Zealand rugby union footballer
- Gary Brooker (1945–2022), British musician
- Grace Brooker (born 1999), New Zealand rugby union and Australian rules footballer
- Greg Brooker (screenwriter), American screenwriter
- Greg Brooker (music producer) (born 1981), British music producer
- Ian Brooker (1934–2016), Australian botanist
- James Brooker (1902–1973), American pole vaulter
- Jaydon Brooker (born 2005), South African field hockey and cricket player
- John Brooker (1861–1947) founder of Brooker & Sons, Australian preserved fruit makers
- Justin Brooker (born 1977), Australian rugby league footballer
- Lee Carroll Brooker, American disabled Army veteran sentenced in 2014 to life in prison without parole for marijuana possession
- Lesley Brooker, Australian ornithologist
- Matt Brooker, British comics artist
- Mervyn Brooker (1954–2019), English cricketer and school headmaster
- Michael Brooker, Australian ornithologist
- Moe Brooker (1940–2022), African-American painter, educator and printmaker
- Moira Brooker (born 1957), British actress
- Patricia Brooker (1935–2015), English television personality (The Only Way Is Essex) and author
- Paul Brooker (born 1976), English footballer
- Richard Brooker (actor) (1954–2013), English actor and stunt performer
- Richard Melville Brooker (1909–1994), British Army lieutenant colonel, spy instructor and commando during the Second World War
- Robert Elton Brooker (1905–2001), American business executive, president of the Whirlpool Corporation and Montgomery Ward
- Sally Brooker, New Zealand inorganic chemist
- Scott Brooker, British puppeteer
- Steve Brooker (born 1981), English footballer
- Thomas Henry Brooker (1850–1927), politician in South Australia, brother of John
- Thomas Kimball Brooker (born 1939), American bibliophile, scholar and businessman
- Todd Brooker (born 1959), Canadian alpine ski racer and TV commentator
- Tom Brooker (1908–1988), Australian rules footballer
- Tommy Brooker (1939–2019), American football player
- Tony Brooker (1925–2019), British computer scientist
- Will Brooker, British writer and professor of film and cultural studies

== Fictional characters ==
- Emma Brooker, from the British soap opera Coronation Street

== See also ==
- Brookers
- Brookes
- Brooks (surname)
- Booker (disambiguation)
