= Broeker =

Broeker (alternative spelling include: Broecker, Bröker and Bröcker) is a German surname. It may be derived from the Old-German word for bridge, "Brück" or the personal name Broekaert (Flemish version of Burchard and its numerous variants) or be a habitational name for a person living in a marsh (Dutch: broek).

== Notable people with the surname ==
- Nick Broeker (born 2000), American football player
- Pat Broeker (born 1950), American member of the Church of Scientology
- Peter Broeker (1926–1980), Canadian Formula One driver
- Thomas Broeker (born 1985), German footballer

== See also ==
- Breuker
- Brooker (disambiguation)
