= Cannabis in Alabama =

Cannabis in Alabama is illegal for recreational use. First-time possession of personal amounts is a misdemeanor, punishable by up to a year in prison, a fine of up to $6000, and a mandatory six months driver's license suspension. Repeat offenses and possession with intent to sell are felonies.

Medical use was legalized in 2021 through a bill passed by the legislature and signed by Governor Kay Ivey. Previous bills enacted in 2014 (Carly's Law) and 2016 (Leni's Law) allowed only for the use of CBD oil to treat seizure disorders.

== History ==
=== Prohibition (1931) ===
Cannabis was banned in Alabama in 1931.

=== Carly's Law for CBD trials (2014) ===
In April 2014, Governor Robert Bentley signed Carly's Law, which permits the University of Alabama at Birmingham to provide non-psychoactive CBD oil to children with debilitating seizures as a clinical study. The legislation provided an affirmative defense for individuals or their caregivers to possess CBD oil of up to 3% THC.

=== Leni's Law to expand CBD allowance (2016) ===
Leni's Law was signed into law by Governor Bentley on May 4, 2016. It expanded the affirmative defense allowed under Carly's Law to include any individual who has a debilitating disease or condition involving seizures. As with Carly's Law, the THC content was not allowed to exceed 3%.

=== Failed attempts to legalize medical marijuana ===
In 2012, Representative Koven Brown, a Republican representing the state's 40th House District, introduced model legislation as "The Alabama Medical Marijuana Patients Rights Act," which would "authorize the medical use of marijuana only for certain qualifying patients who have been diagnosed by a physician as having a serious medical condition." In part, it enumerated 24 serious medical conditions, or any other "chronic or persistent medical symptom" that "substantially limits the ability of the person to conduct one or more major life activities as defined in the Americans with Disabilities Act of 1990 (Public Law 101-336)" which "if not alleviated, may cause serious harm to the patient's safety or physical or mental health." The bill died in committee. Three years later, it was reintroduced with minor changes in the State Senate as SB326 and sponsored by State Senator Bobby Singleton.

In 2015 state Senator Bobby Singleton proposed the Medical Marijuana Patient Safe Access Act, which would have allowed patients with 25 severe conditions to access medical cannabis. The bill was passed by the Senate Judiciary Committee with near-unanimous approval, but failed to reach the Senate floor. Senator Jabo Waggoner, head of the Senate Rules Committee, blocked the bills further progress, stating: "It is bad legislation... We don't need that in Alabama." High Times described the proposed bill as "the most impressive piece of legislation the South has seen in regards to establishing a statewide medical marijuana program".

In 2016, the Lee Carroll Brooker case brought national attention to Alabama's cannabis laws. The case, which gave 72 year old Brooker life without parole for marijuana possession, was described by Roy Moore as "excessive and unjustified".

=== Attempts to reduce penalties for non-medical use ===
In 2019, a bill by Bobby Singleton to reduce cannabis penalties advanced in the state senate. It would have eliminated the felony charge for a second personal use possession offense, saying instead that a person commits first-degree possession when they have two ounces (57 g) or more, and that first-degree possession is not a felony until the third conviction. Also, second-degree possession would have been reduced from a misdemeanor to a violation.

Also in 2019, a bill by Patricia Todd to reduce the penalty for possession was voted down in the House Judiciary Committee. Her bill would have made possession of 1 ounce (28 g) or less punishable only as a violation. A nearly identical bill by Dick Brewbaker advanced in the Senate Judiciary Committee by a 6-4 vote and moved to the Senate floor.

=== Medical use legalized (2021) ===
On May 17, 2021, Governor Kay Ivey signed into law Senate Bill 46, the Darren Wesley 'Ato' Hall Compassion Act. The bill allows the use of cannabis with a physician's recommendation for treatment of approximately 15 qualifying conditions listed in the bill. Patients can only use cannabis if a physician certifies that traditional medications have failed to improve the patient's condition. No sale of raw plant materials or food products such as cookies or candies are allowed. A 9% tax on gross sales of medical cannabis products is also required.

Senate Bill 46 passed the Senate on February 24, 2021, by a vote of 21–8, then passed the House on May 6, 2021, by a vote of 68–34, after Republican lawmakers staged a filibuster for nine hours on the House floor. The Senate then voted 20–9 to approve changes that were made by the House. The bill was sponsored by Tim Melson (R-Florence) in the Senate and Mike Ball (R-Madison) in the House.

=== Medical cannabis sales (2026) ===
The first medical cannabis sales in Alabama occurred in June 2026, after years of litigation.

== Gonzalez v. Raich amicus ==
Despite not allowing medical cannabis, on October 13, 2004, Alabama along with Mississippi and Louisiana filed an amicus brief protesting Gonzalez v. Raich, with Alabama stating: "The point is that, as a sovereign member of the federal union, California is entitled to make for itself the tough policy choices that affect its citizens."

== Legal code ==
Under Alabama Code, first-time "personal use" offenders can be charged with possession in the second degree, § 13A-12-214. That offense is classified as a misdemeanor, and the maximum penalty authorized is a one-year jail term (although it can be suspended with probation ordered) and a $6,000 fine.

Possession in the First Degree, § 13A-12-213, is charged for non-"personal use" (i.e. intent to sell) and second and subsequent "personal use" offenses. This charge is a Class C felony punishable with imprisonment of 1-to-10 years (there is a mandatory minimum of 1-year-and-1-day to serve which cannot be suspended by the judge) and $15,000 fine.

Sale of any amount is a Class B felony punishable with a 2- to 20-year sentence (with the 2 years being a mandatory minimum) and maximum $30,000 fine. Sale to a minor is punishable by a sentence of 10 years to life imprisonment and a maximum fine of $60,000.

As Alabama is a "smoke a joint, lose your license" state, any conviction for a cannabis offense is punished with a mandatory six month driver's license suspension.
