= Little Moltke Harbor =

Little Moltke Harbor (54°32′S 36°5′W) is a small bay between Pirner Point and the ice cliffs of Ross Glacier, lying 1 nautical mile (2 km) south of Moltke Harbor in the west side of Royal Bay, South Georgia. It was first surveyed by the German group of the International Polar Year Investigations, 1882–83, under K. Schrader. The name "Little Moltke", derived from nearby Moltke Harbor, was used for this feature by the sealers in South Georgia, and the full name, Little Moltke Harbor, was approved in order to indicate the nature of the feature.
