= Brooker =

Brooker may refer to:

== Places ==
- Brooker, Florida, United States, a town
- Brooker Creek, Florida - see Brooker Creek Headwaters Nature Preserve
- Brooker, South Australia, a locality in the District Council of Tumby Bay
- Hundred of Brooker, a cadastral unit in South Australia
- Mount Brooker, South Georgia Island

== Other uses ==
- Brooker (surname), a list of people and a fictional character
- Brooker Highway, Tasmania, Australia
- The Brooker Group, a Thailand-based listed company
- Brooker v Police, a Supreme Court of New Zealand case
