= Webb Glacier =

Webb Glacier may refer to:

- Webb Glacier (South Georgia)
- Webb Glacier (Victoria Land)
