= Dawn Brooker =

British clinical psychologist (born 1959)

Dawn Brooker MBE
- Born: 1959 (age 66–67)
- Education: University of Birmingham
- Scientific career
- Workplaces: University of Worcester; University of Bradford
- Thesis: Improving the quality of care for people with dementia (1997)
- Doctoral advisor: Tom Kitwood

Dawn June Ratcliffe Brooker (born 1959) is a British clinical psychologist and Professor Emeritus in Dementia Studies at the University of Worcester. In 2020 she was awarded an MBE for her services to dementia care. She founded the university's Association for Dementia Studies in 2009 and served as its director until March 2022.

== Education ==
Brooker received a BSc (Hons) in psychology from the University of Birmingham in 1981 and an MSc in clinical psychology in 1984, when she qualified as a clinical psychologist. She became interested in dementia because of her personal experiences, having grown up with a grandfather with dementia.

She worked in clinical and managerial posts in the National Health Service for 17 years before moving into academia in 1999. She first heard Tom Kitwood, a pioneer in dementia care who would eventually become her doctoral supervisor, speak at a conference in 1988. She completed her PhD at Birmingham in 1998. Her doctoral research focused on improving the quality of care for people with dementia.

== Research and career ==
In 2005, Brooker was awarded a personal chair at the University of Bradford, where she continued Kitwood's work on person-centred dementia care.

In 2009, Brooker founded the Association for Dementia Studies at the University of Worcester and became its founding director.

Brooker developed the VIPS framework for person-centred dementia care, which underpins the Care Fit for VIPS online toolkit.

In 2021, she led a National Institute for Health and Care Research (NIHR) funded study examining the sustainability of community-based Meeting Centres for people affected by dementia in Herefordshire, Worcestershire and Powys.

Brooker retired as director of the Association for Dementia Studies in March 2022 and continued as Professor Emeritus at the university.

Brooker is also co-editor, with Keith Oliver, of Open University Press's Reconsidering Dementia book series.

== Selected publications ==
=== Books ===
- Brooker, Dawn; Lillyman, Sue; Bruce, Mary (11 August 2022). Dementia Care (2nd ed.). Routledge.
- Brooker, Dawn; Latham, Isabelle (21 November 2015). Person-centred dementia care: making services better with the VIPS framework (Second ed.). London. ISBN 978-1-78450-170-9. OCLC 933754452.
- Brooker, Dawn, ed. (7 January 2019). Dementia reconsidered, revisited: the person still comes first. Kitwood, T. M. (Second ed.). London. ISBN 978-0-335-24802-5. OCLC 1079788401.
- May, Hazel; Edwards, Paul; Brooker, Dawn (2009). Enriched care planning for people with dementia: a good practice guide for delivering person-centred dementia care. London: Jessica Kingsley Publishers. ISBN 978-1-84310-405-6. OCLC 301879719.

=== Articles ===
- Brooker, Dawn (20 January 2024). "Person-Centered Dementia Care: The Legacy of Tom Kitwood". International Journal of Person Centered Medicine. 12 (2): 21–36. doi:10.5750/ijpcm.v12i2.1114.
- Brooker, Dawn (2003). "What is person-centred care in dementia?". Reviews in Clinical Gerontology. 13 (3): 215–222. doi:10.1017/S095925980400108X. ISSN 1469-9036.
- Brooker, D.; Duce, L. (1 November 2000). "Wellbeing and activity in dementia: A comparison of group reminiscence therapy, structured goal-directed group activity and unstructured time". Aging & Mental Health. 4 (4): 354–358. doi:10.1080/713649967. ISSN 1360-7863. S2CID 144845300.
- Brooker, D. (1 October 2005). "Dementia Care Mapping: A Review of the Research Literature". The Gerontologist. 45 (Supplement 1): 11–18. doi:10.1093/geront/45.suppl_1.11. ISSN 0016-9013. PMID 16230745.

== Awards and honours ==
- 2019 Universities UK Top 100 Lifesavers working in Higher Education
- 2019 National Dementia Care Award Lifetime Achievement Award
- 2020 Elected to the MBE in the Order of the British Empire
- 2022 University Fellowship, University of Worcester
