= Decarceration in the United States =

Overview article

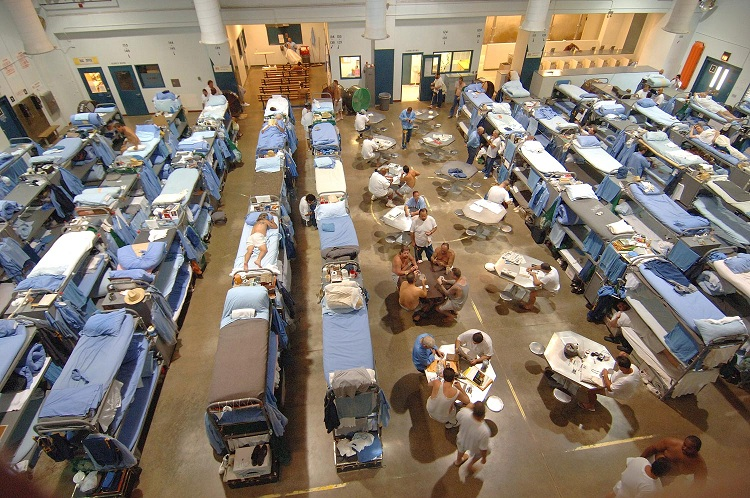
An overcrowded California state prison (July 2006)

Decarceration in the United States involves government policies and community campaigns aimed at reducing the number of people held in prisons and jails. Decarceration, the opposite of incarceration, entails reducing the rate of imprisonment at the federal, state and municipal level. A 2025 report from the Prison Policy Initiative states that there are nearly 2 million people incarcerated in the United States. The United States on average incarcerates more people per capita than any other independent democracy. The 2025 report shows that state prisons have 1,098,000 people incarcerated, local jails have 562,000, federal prisons and jails 204,000 and immigration detention centers have 48,000 incarcerated.

As of 2019, the US was home to 5% of the global population but 25% of its prisoners. Until the COVID-19 pandemic, the U.S. possessed the world's highest incarceration rate: 655 inmates for every 100,000 people, enough inmates to equal the populations of Philadelphia or Houston. The COVID-19 pandemic reinvigorated the discussion surrounding prison reduction as the virus posed a threat to the health of those incarcerated in prisons and detention centers where the ability to properly socially distance is limited. As a result of the push for criminal justice reform in the wake of the pandemic, as of 2022, the incarceration rate in the United States declined to 505 per 100,000, resulting in the United States no longer having the highest incarceration rate in the world, but still being in the top five.

== Decarceration efforts ==
Decarceration includes overlapping reformist and abolitionist strategies, from "front door" options such as sentencing reform, decriminalization, diversion and mental health treatment to "back door" approaches, exemplified by parole reform and early release into re-entry programs, amnesty for inmates convicted of non-violent offenses and imposition of prison capacity limits. While reforms focus on incremental changes, abolitionist approaches include budget reallocations, prison closures and restorative and transformative justice programs that challenge incarceration as an effective deterrent and necessary means of incapacitation. Abolitionists support investments in familial and community mental health, affordable housing and quality education to gradually transition prison and jail employees to jobs in other economic sectors.

"Multiple American states punish sexual offenses with chemical castration and allow chemical or surgical castration instead of prison time. Surgical castration of sex offenders virtually eliminates recidivism by castrated offenders; chemical castration is also effective." The American Civil Liberties Union opposes chemical castration as a violation of the Eighth Amendment ban on cruel and unusual punishment.

== Opposition ==
Opponents of decarceration include think tanks that assert mass decarceration would release violent criminals back onto the streets to re-offend; law enforcement organizations that argue drug decriminalization and legalization will escalate crime; prison guard unions that seek to preserve jobs and economic security; "tough on crime" lawmakers responding to public concerns about violent crime; and private prison contractors who contributed $1.6 million to candidates, parties and independent expenditures in the 2016 election cycle.

== Decarceration in the context of incarceration ==
=== Increased incarceration rates ===
According to 2018–2020 statistics, over 2.2 million people in the U.S. are incarcerated in prison, jail and detention centers, with 1.3 million inmates in state prison, 631,000 held in local jails under county and municipal jurisdiction, 226,000 in federal prisons and jails, 50,165 in immigrant detention centers and 48,000 in juvenile facilities. An additional 4.5 million people are under community supervision, either probation or parole. According to a survey distributed by the Pew Charitable Trusts in December 2015, "the number of accused and convicted criminal offenders in the United States who are supervised with ankle monitors and other GPS-system electronic tracking devices rose nearly 140 percent over 10 years," resulting in more than 125,000 people under electronic supervision in 2015, an increase from 53,000 in 2005.

The U.S. incarceration rate increased 700% between the 1970s and 2000s, when it went from 200,000 incarcerated in 1973 to its peak of 2.4 million in 2009. Initially fueled in the 1970s and 1980s by increases in violent crimes and property offenses, incarceration rates continued to escalate even after the crime wave subsided in the mid-1990s, with the U.S. government spending $270 billion to incarcerate prisoners in 2018.

Scholars say the reasons for the continued increase in incarceration rates include: "tough on crime" legislators articulating public fears triggered by several high-profile murders; the government's war on drugs in which communities of color saw increased arrests and prison sentences; and prison system stakeholders who benefitted economically from incarceration. Tough on crime campaigns led to the abolition of parole in some states, restrictions on the power of parole boards and harsher mandatory minimum sentencing laws, such as California's 1994 Three Strikes law, a ballot proposition (since amended) that imposed a 25 years to life sentence for multiple felony convictions.

=== Federal and state prison populations ===
Decarceration proponents point to the U.S.'s high incarceration rates when pushing for reforms to reduce what they call a racially skewed prison population that sees African Americans incarcerated disproportionately at five times or more the rate of whites.

In the most recent comprehensive Department of Justice statistical analysis, the Bureau of Justice Statistics in 2020 issued a report "Prisoners in 2018" that said between 2017 and 2018, the total prison population declined by 24,000 inmates, but still resulted in the incarceration of 1,465,200 inmates under federal and state jurisdiction. The combined state and federal imprisonment rate, excluding local jails, was 431 sentenced (federal and state) prisoners per 100,000 U.S. residents, constituting the lowest federal and state incarceration rate since 1996 when there were 427 sentenced prisoners per 100,000 residents. The report said the imprisonment rate fell 15% across the decade, dropping 28% (the lowest since 1989) among African Americans, 21% among Latinos, and 13% among whites.

In 2017, more than half (56%) of state prisoners sentenced to one year or longer were serving a sentence for a violent crime.

In 2018, Minnesota, Maine, Massachusetts, Rhode Island, and Vermont had the lowest imprisonment rates in the U.S., with fewer than 200 sentenced prisoners per 100,000 residents." In contrast, a total of 22 states reported imprisonment rates that exceeded the national average.

DOJ (2018 analysis): states with highest incarceration rates
Louisiana	Oklahoma	Mississippi	Arkansas	Arizona
695	693	626	589	559

(Sentenced prisoners per 100,000 residents)

At the end of 2017, fewer than 15% of sentenced state prisoners were serving time for drug sale or use (4% for possession).

Among sentenced state prisoners at year-end 2017, the most recent year for which crime-related data was available, an estimated three-fifths of Blacks and Hispanics (61% each) and nearly half of whites (48%) were behind bars for a violent offense.

At the same time, 23% of sentenced white prisoners in state prison were incarcerated for a property offense, compared to 13% of sentenced black and Hispanic prisoners. By the end of 2018, an estimated 3% of federal and state prisoners were 65 or older.

Male prisoners constituted 93% of the prison population; female prisoners 7%. Non-US citizens made up 7.7% of the prison population, comparable to 6.9% of the general population.

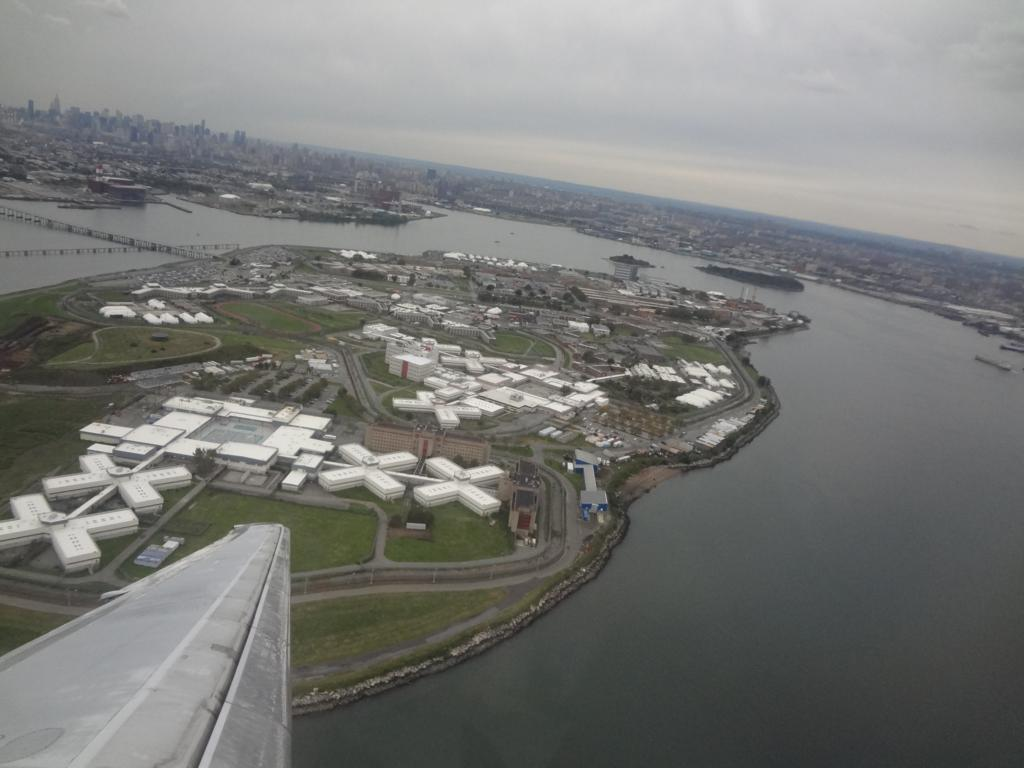
Rikers Island Jail, New York, 2012

=== Inmates held pre-trial ===
In 2020, the non-profit Prison Policy Initiative issued a report, "Mass Incarceration: The Whole Pie 2020", that said, based on the most recent census data and information from the Bureau of Prisons, an overwhelming majority of inmates in county and municipal jails were being held pre-trial, without having been convicted of a crime. The Pre-Trial Justice Institute noted, "Six out of 10 people in U.S. jails—nearly a half million individuals on any given day—are awaiting trial. People who have not been found guilty of the charges against them account for 95% of all jail population growth from 2000 to 2014."

In 2017, 482,100 inmates in federal and state prisons were held pre-trial.

Decarceration advocates contend the large pre-trial detention population serves as a compelling reason for bail reform anchored in a presumption of innocence. "We don't want people sitting in jails only because they cannot afford their financial bail," said Representative John Tilley (D) of Kentucky, a state that has eliminated commercial bail and relies on a risk assessment to determine a defendant's flight risk.

In March 2020, the Department of Justice issued its report, noting the county and municipal jail population, totaling 738,400 inmates, had decreased by 12% over the last decade, from an estimated 258 jail inmates per 100,000 U.S. residents in 2008 to 226 per 100,000 in 2018. For the first time since 1990, the 2018 jail incarceration rate for African Americans fell below 600 per 100,000, while the juvenile jail population dropped 56%, from 7,700 to 3,400.

In 2018, sixty-eight percent of jail inmates were behind bars on felony charges, about two-thirds of the total jail population was awaiting court action or held for other reasons.

Racial disparity is an enormous factor in bail, and its effect on pretrial detention is profound. Studies show that African Americans and Hispanics are more likely to be detained pretrial because of their inability to post bail, which increases the likelihood of conviction and longer sentences. The article "The Downstream Effects of Bail and Pretrial Detention on Racial Disparities in Incarceration" by Donnelly EA and Macdonald JM, highlights significant disparities based on race in the criminal justice system. The disparities are rooted in wealth-based bail systems that affect racial minorities, particularly African Americans and Hispanics. The findings are that because of lower median household incomes, the economic disparity often results in prolonged pretrial detention, which exacerbates racial disparities in incarceration and conviction rates.

== Trans-partisan support for decarceration ==
In "The Politics of Decarceration" (Yale Law Review, 2016) professor Rachel Barkow asserts that the call to decarcerate transcends party politics, with ideologically driven liberals and conservatives agreeing for different reasons the U.S. must reduce its prison population. For liberals or progressives, Barkow writes mass incarceration was born from structural racism, capitalism, and social inequality; for conservatives, it was a product of federal over-reach and bloated budgets that consumed too many tax dollars. While liberals focused on steering inmates back into productive societal endeavors, Barkow writes that conservatives embraced the notion of spiritual redemption or reconciliation over retribution.

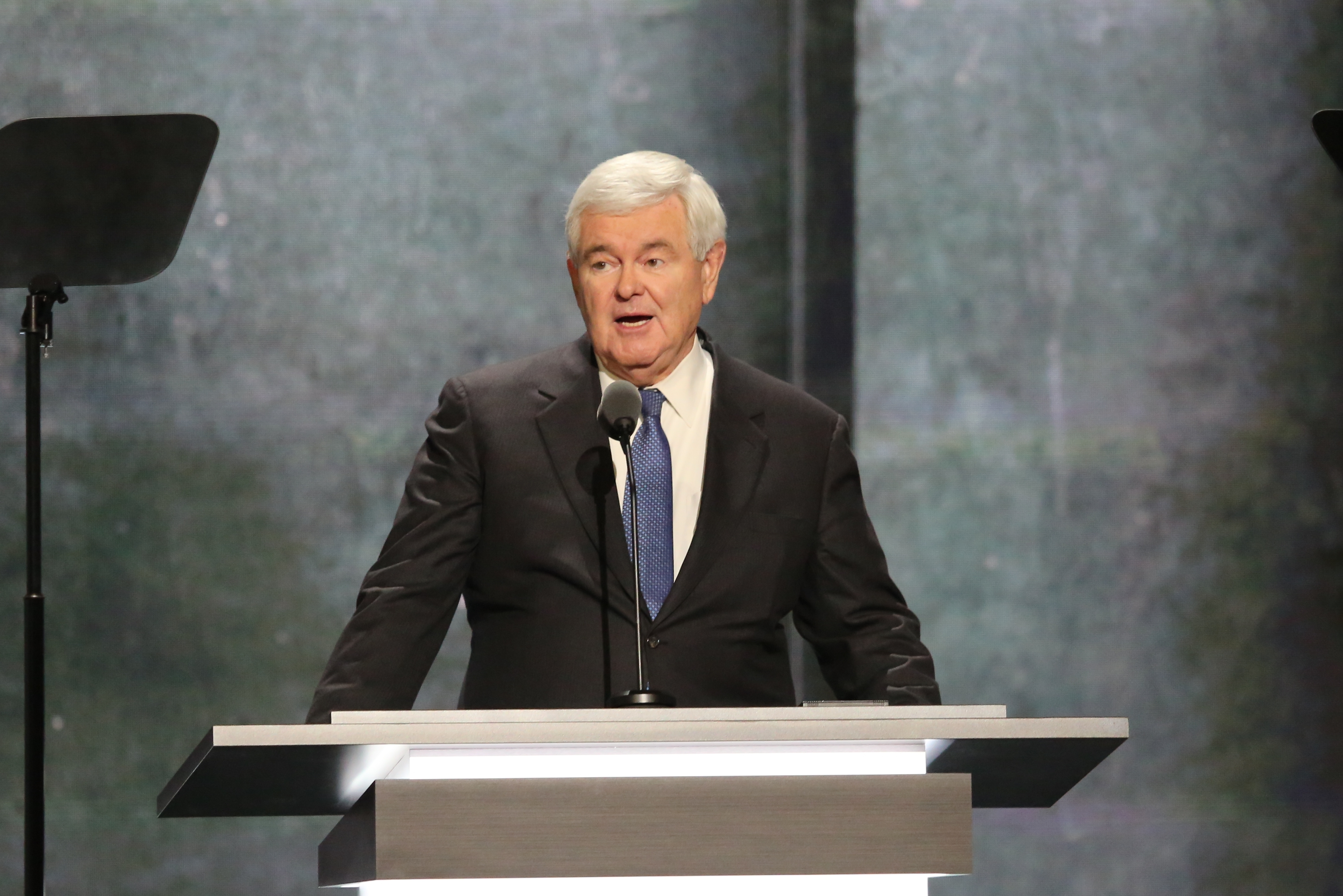
Former GOP House Speaker Newt Gingrich, a once law and order politician who joined with evangelicals to support prison reform

In contrast to bipartisanship, in which entrenched politicians and party leaders reach a compromise, Barkow says trans-partisanship is "led by ideological true-believers on the back benches, and distinct factions that converge on shared policy positions through separate, independent routes." Barkow traces the pivotal moment in transpartisanship back to 2012, when conservative politicians Newt Gingrich and Grover Norquist, influenced by Watergate felon and "evangelical celebrity" Charles Colson, issued a "Statement of Principles" that judged the American criminal justice system as broken with prisons and jail expenditures the fastest growing area of state budgets, second only to Medicaid expansion.

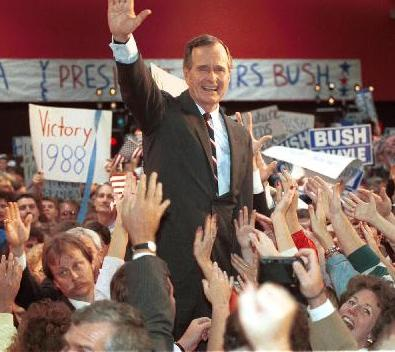
1988. Winning Presidential candidate George H.W. Bush.

The turn-around followed an era of bipartisan support for prison expansion, triggered, in part, by the 1988 presidential campaign in which Republican George Herbert Walker Bush defeated Democratic Party opponent Michael Dukakis, then Governor of Massachusetts, with a tough on crime platform buoyed by an independent expenditure group's broadcast of a commercial attacking Dukakis for governing a state that furloughed Willie Horton, an African-American prisoner who, upon his release from prison, raped a white woman and fatally stabbed her boyfriend.

Despite what critics called the race-based politics of the campaign, scholars assert Republicans and Democrats, in the years that followed, competed to see which party could prove tougher on crime, culminating with the passage of the 1994 crime bill signed by President Bill Clinton, that provided incentive grants for states to construct more prisons, "funded 100,000 more police officers, and supported grant programs that encouraged police to conduct drug-related arrests"—in what some have called an escalation of the war on drugs.

== Recidivism ==
In the Justice Department's "2018 Update on Prisoner Recidivism: a 9 Year Follow-up Period (2005–2014)" statisticians noted an 83% recidivism rate during a nine-year period following the 2005 release of prisoners across 30 states. An estimated 68% of released prisoners were arrested again within three years, with the highest recidivism rate among property offenders, who were more likely to be arrested than released violent offenders. To reduce the high rates of recidivism, the Department of Justice's Bureau of Prisons recommends correctional or carceral institutions adopt the following reforms to prepare early on for a prisoner's eventual re-entry into society:

- Inventory the inmate's needs (treatment for substance use; educational needs, risk of recidivism).
- Build a semi-autonomous school district within each prison (Prisoners who participate in high school, career, and technical programs have a 43% lower recidivism rate.).
- Integrate online education with classroom instruction (Distribute tablets.).
- Take advantage of the Second Chance Pell pilot program for educational opportunities.
- Provide opportunities for inmates to develop marketable job skills ("inmates who worked in prison industries were 24 percent less likely to recidivate").
- Make mental health a priority and offer cognitive behavioral therapy (CBT).
- Ensure inmates receive treatment for substance use disorders, including opioid use disorder.
- Encourage the maintenance of family ties through video conferencing; child-friendly visitation spaces; family reunification events.
- Include a gender-specific trauma treatment program for women inmates.
- Reduce solitary confinement for adult prisoners; eliminate solitary confinement for juveniles.
- Phase out and ultimately end the Bureau of Prison's use of private prisons.

The Bureau of Prisons was criticised by David E. Patton, executive director of the nonprofit Federal Defenders of New York. Patton alleged to The Washington Post in January 2020 that it has undermined the will of Congress to reduce the inmate population, arguing: "For decades it refused to exercise the authority given to it by Congress to release incarcerated people who were terminally ill, infirm, or otherwise suffered from extraordinary circumstances ... and for decades it has not provided enough vocational, educational, mental health, and substance abuse programming despite abundant need and lengthy waitlists." The newspaper reported that, according to Justice Department data, more than half of federal inmates do not receive treatment for substance use and over 80 percent were not able to take advantage of a technical or vocational course.

== E-carceration ==
In response to the shift from brick and mortar carceral institutions to what law enforcement termed "community control" under electronic monitoring, an oppositional movement pushed back, describing a widening net of "mass incarceration to mass surveillance" that threatened privacy and individual freedom while reinforcing social stratification, disrupting an individual's connections to the community and resulting in a subgroup of second-class citizens in the U.S., where African Americans are imprisoned at nearly six times the rate of white people. Michelle Alexander, author and civil rights advocate, refers to electronic ankle monitoring practices as the "Newest Jim Crow", increasingly segregating people of color under bail reform laws that "look good on paper" but are based on a presumption of guilt and replace bail with shackles as pre-trial detainees consent to electronic monitoring in order to be released from jail. "Entire communities could "become trapped in digital prisons that keep them locked out of neighborhoods where jobs and opportunity can be found," says Alexander, who advocates re-integration of individuals into the community via quality schools, jobs, drug treatment and mental health services as opposed to "high-tech management and control."

On the other hand, advocates of "community control" argue electronic monitoring is humane—sometimes allowing pretrial detainees, who have not been convicted yet but make up most of the local jail population, as well as offenders on probation and parole, an opportunity to live at home with their families, enjoying freedom to move from one room to the next rather than confined in a six-by-eight foot cell. Electronic monitoring, they argue, saves cash poor state valuable resources while benefitting offenders who can become productive. Says Ann Toyer of the Oklahoma Department of Corrections, "We get them back into the community where they can work, they pay taxes, they have access to community services ... If we can get them back into the community, get them working, they can pay for those services." In addition, proponents of electronic monitoring say the technology can be used to incapacitate violent criminals and reduce recidivism, though studies on the use of electronic monitors to reduce repeat offenses have produced mixed results.

== Black Lives Matter ==
In 2016, Black Lives Matter (BLM) in coalition with 60 organizations published a policy platform calling for decarceration in the United States through long-term investment in universal health care and public education, not incarceration. The Black Lives Matter Movement's policy statement supported reallocating federal, state, and local monies currently invested in "prisons, police, surveillance, and exploitative corporations into long-term safety strategies" such as jobs programs, employment training and restorative justice. The policy platform also addressed decarceration through community control of the police, including the power to hire and fire police officers, issue subpoenas in investigations of officer misconduct and determine disciplinary consequences.

In 2019, the LA County Board of Supervisors voted to cancel a near $2 billion contract to build a new 3,800-bed jail opposed by Black Lives Matter and other members of the grassroots organization Reform LA Jails. Patrisse Cullors, chair of Reform LA Jails and a co-founder of Black Lives Matter, told the press, "Really what we have is people living their lives, a lot of them living on Skid Row, a cycle of poverty, a cycle of drug addiction and mental illness, and then we have jails ... We don't have an in-between infrastructure." Opponents of the proposed jail asserted it would increase, rather than decrease the inmate population, and advocated for investments in services for communities of color. LA County Sheriff Alex Villanueva told reporters he thought the move was irresponsible because the existing jail did not have enough room for high security inmates.

=== Defund the police ===
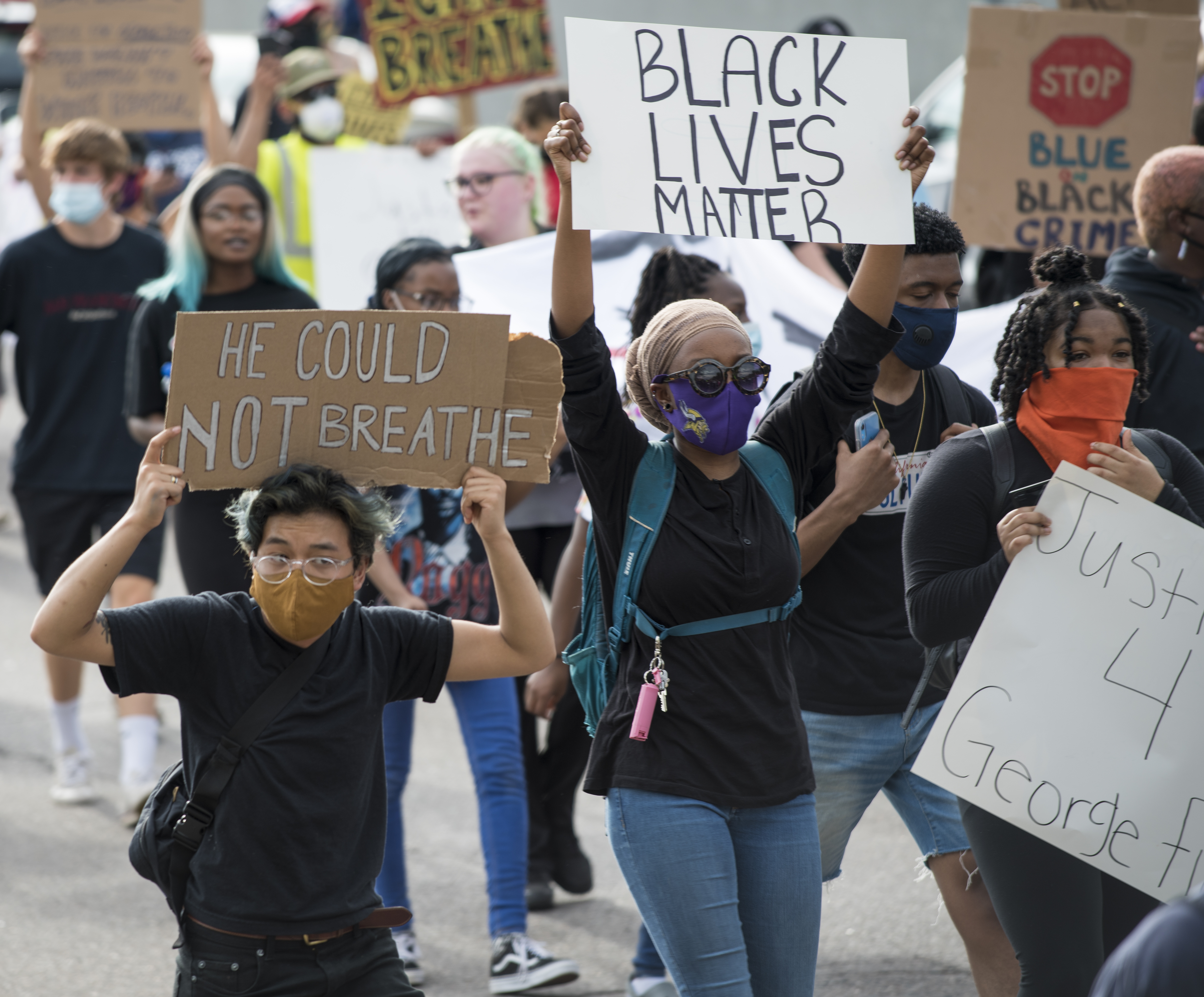
Protest against police violence and murder of George Floyd. Minneapolis, Minnesota. May 26, 2020.

On June 7, 2020, in the wake of global George Floyd protests and Black Lives Matter's call to "Defund the Police", the Minneapolis City Council voted to "disband its police department" to shift funding to social programs in communities of color. City Council President Lisa Bender said, "Our efforts at incremental reform have failed. Period."

Prior to the vote, Black Lives Matter circulated a petition to defund the police in response to massive nationwide protests over police violence and the murder of George Floyd, an unarmed Black man who was murdered by a white Minneapolis police officer who knelt on Floyd's neck for over nine minutes. Black Lives Matter, Critical Resistance and other grassroots organizations called on lawmakers to cut the budgets for law enforcement and invest instead in communities of color to "ensure Black people not only survive, but thrive."

Despite rising unemployment and municipal coffers devastated by the COVID-19 pandemic, many local governments—cutting housing and health care—continued to support robust funding for police, with Los Angeles budgeting $1.8 billion, almost half of the general fund, for the Los Angeles Police Department, New York maintaining a $6 billion police budget while cutting youth programs, and Philadelphia increasing its police budget by $14 million while cutting arts, recreation and library programs. Fox News host Tucker Carlson denounced calls to defund the police, saying that while he agreed with public outrage over Floyd's murder, the United States would fall apart without law enforcement, leaving "thugs" in charge to fill the power vacuum. Depending on one's perspective, the "defund the police" demand can be interpreted as police abolition or reallocation of municipal budgets to shift some money from law enforcement to underfunded social services.

== Decarceration during the COVID-19 pandemic ==
=== Detention centers ===
Amid the COVID-19 pandemic, with thousands of immigrants locked up at 200 U.S. detention centers, Amnesty International called on Immigration and Customs Enforcement (ICE) to "grant humanitarian parole to immigration detainees except in the most extraordinary of circumstances requiring ongoing detention." The global human rights organization accused ICE of concealing the number of detainees who had been exposed or contracted the virus, keeping the detainees, their lawyers, family members and general public in the dark about the spread of infections.

On March 26, 2020, ProPublica, a non-profit news agency, reported a confrontation occurred between guards and detainees at the SouthTexas Processing Facility, operated by federal contractor GEO Group, in which guards shot detainees with pepper spray after the detainees protested a lack of COVID-19 screening procedures for new arrivals. When contacted, "ICE referred reporters to a fact sheet, which provides information on how the detention center processes migrants" and said the staff daily reviews recommended guidelines from the Centers for Disease Control and Prevention on proper detention staff protocols.

In a May 8, 2020, Washington Post opinion piece entitled "We were left to sicken and die from the coronavirus in immigration detention. Here's how I got out," Nicolas Morales, a 37-year old undocumented immigrant detained for five months in New Jersey's Elizabeth Detention Center, an ICE-contracted facility run by CoreCivic, a private for-profit corporation traded on the New York Stock Exchange, explains his five-month ordeal ended after a federal judge declared COVID-19 posed a serious health risk inside the detention center. "We shared toilets, showers, sinks, communal surfaces and breathing air. We did not have hand sanitizer or masks. We could not disinfect our shared surfaces. We could not maintain any meaningful distance among us, let alone six feet of distance. We were never permitted outside; there is no meaningful outdoor space," writes Morales who participated in a hunger strike to protest detention center conditions. As of May 8, 2020, ICE still had not halted transfers of immigrants from one detention center to another, according to a Politico article, "'Like Petri Dishes for the Virus': ICE Detention Centers Threaten the Rural South".

On May 9, 2020, the Los Angeles Times reported that 70% or 792 of the 1,162 male inmates at Lompoc Federal Prison in California had tested positive for COVID-19, surpassing the 644 cases at the federal prison on Terminal Island, with Lompoc and Terminal Island prisons accounting for 47% of all federal inmates who tested positive. California has been the leading state in the number of cases, totaling 49,395, since June 25, 2021.

=== ACLU projection of COVID-19 incarceration fatalities ===
Partnering with epidemiologists, mathematicians and statisticians, the American Civil Liberties Union (ACLU) presented an epidemiological model suggesting that as many as 200,000 people could die from COVID-19—double the government estimate—if federal, state and local governments dismiss prison and jail inmates in the public health response. The ACLU predicted thousands of lives could be saved, as many as 23,000 people in jail and 76,000 in the larger community, if law enforcement stopped arrests for all but the most serious offenses and doubled the rate of release for those already arrested.

=== Police "Cite and Release" protocol ===
In a Washington Post editorial, Rosa Brooks, a law professor, author and former police reserve officer in Washington, D.C., described the job-related health risks when making an arrest:

I put my hands into strangers' pockets during searches; ran my fingers inside waistbands, bra bands and shoes; put handcuffs onto wrists and held those I was arresting by the arm as I escorted them to the patrol car. People coughed, sneezed, vomited and bled on me.

Brooks argued police agencies should immediately "suspend enforcement measures that require physical contact between law enforcement personnel and members of the public", unless not arresting or detaining someone poses an immediate danger of death or grave injury.

Several police departments adopted strategies to reduce arrests: Los Angeles, Seattle, San Francisco, Chicago, Philadelphia, Fort Worth, Denver, Miami, Nashville, Tucson and Rockford, with departments issuing citations and court summons, rather than making arrests for low-level or non-violent crimes ranging from "narcotics to theft to prostitution".

Decarceration proponents advocate for "cite and release" police protocols to become the post-COVID-19 norm in order to reduce the pretrial jail population.

=== The COVID Prison Project ===
The COVID Prison Project, composed of a group of public health scientists, is a database that provides real-time data on the state of the coronavirus pandemic within correctional facilities in the United States. According to the database, as of April 26, 2022, there had been 582,946 cases of COVID-19 among incarcerated persons in the US and 198,921 COVID-19 cases among staff working in prisons. From those cases, there had been 2,875 deaths of incarcerated individuals in prisons due to COVID-19 and 277 deaths of staff in prisons due to COVID-19.

=== Prison population changes ===
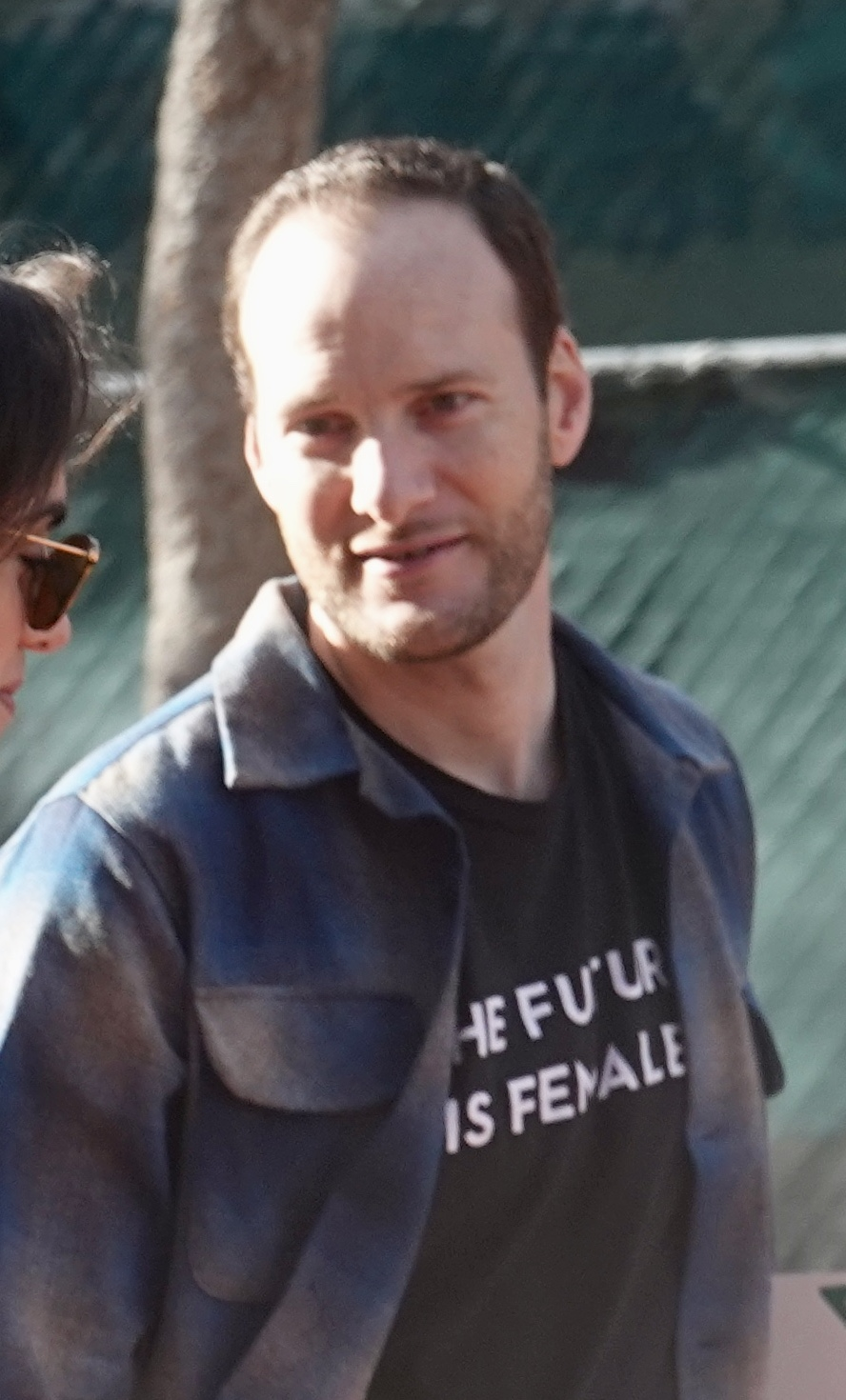
Chesa Boudin, SF District Attorney, wearing a The Future is Female shirt at 2019 Women's March San Francisco

In May 2020, the Prison Policy Initiative reported that dozens of counties had purposely decreased their jail populations to reduce the spread of COVID-19 among inmates, guards and their families. They lowered their jail populations so that inmates, who normally lived in close quarters, some of them sharing cells and double-bunking, could practice social distancing. County law enforcement released inmates nearing the end of their sentences on misdemeanor charges; inmates held on low-level and non-violent offenses; people over 60; pregnant women; inmates with health conditions; people held for technical violations of probation and parole. Examples of non-violent jail population reductions included: Hennepin County, Minnesota: 44%; Denver, Colorado: 41%; LA County, California: 30%; Maricopa County, Arizona: 30%; Mulltnomah County, Oregon: 30%; Anderson County, Tennessee, and Franklin County, Ohio: more than 30%; Philadelphia, Pennsylvania: 17%; Washington, D.C.: 21.8%.

Data published by the Prison Policy Initiative in early 2022 showed that state prison populations had fallen, but suggested this was due to fewer people being sent to prison, rather than more prisoners being released. Nationwide, prisons released 10% fewer people in 2020 than in 2019, despite the pandemic. The drop in prison admissions was a mostly unintended consequence of delays within the court system. The data also showed that despite policy changes early in the pandemic that engendered a decrease in jail populations, as of December 2021, jail populations were increasing, and in some cases were higher than before March 2020.

=== Activism by San Francisco district attorney Chesa Boudin ===
San Francisco District Attorney Chesa Boudin, son of imprisoned Weather Underground member David Gilbert, said he reduced his city's jail population by 40% during the COVID-19 outbreak. Boudin told Forbes magazine (March 2020), "We can move to quickly and safely reduce the jail population so that jails are only holding people who are presenting an active threat of violence to the community." During the COVID-19 pandemic, Boudin joined 30 other prosecutors, including Rachel Rollins, Suffolk County, Massachusetts; Larry Krasner, Philadelphia, Pennsylvania; and Joe Gonzales, Bexar County, Texas, in calling on local officials to "stop admitting people to jail absent a serious risk to the physical safety of the community."

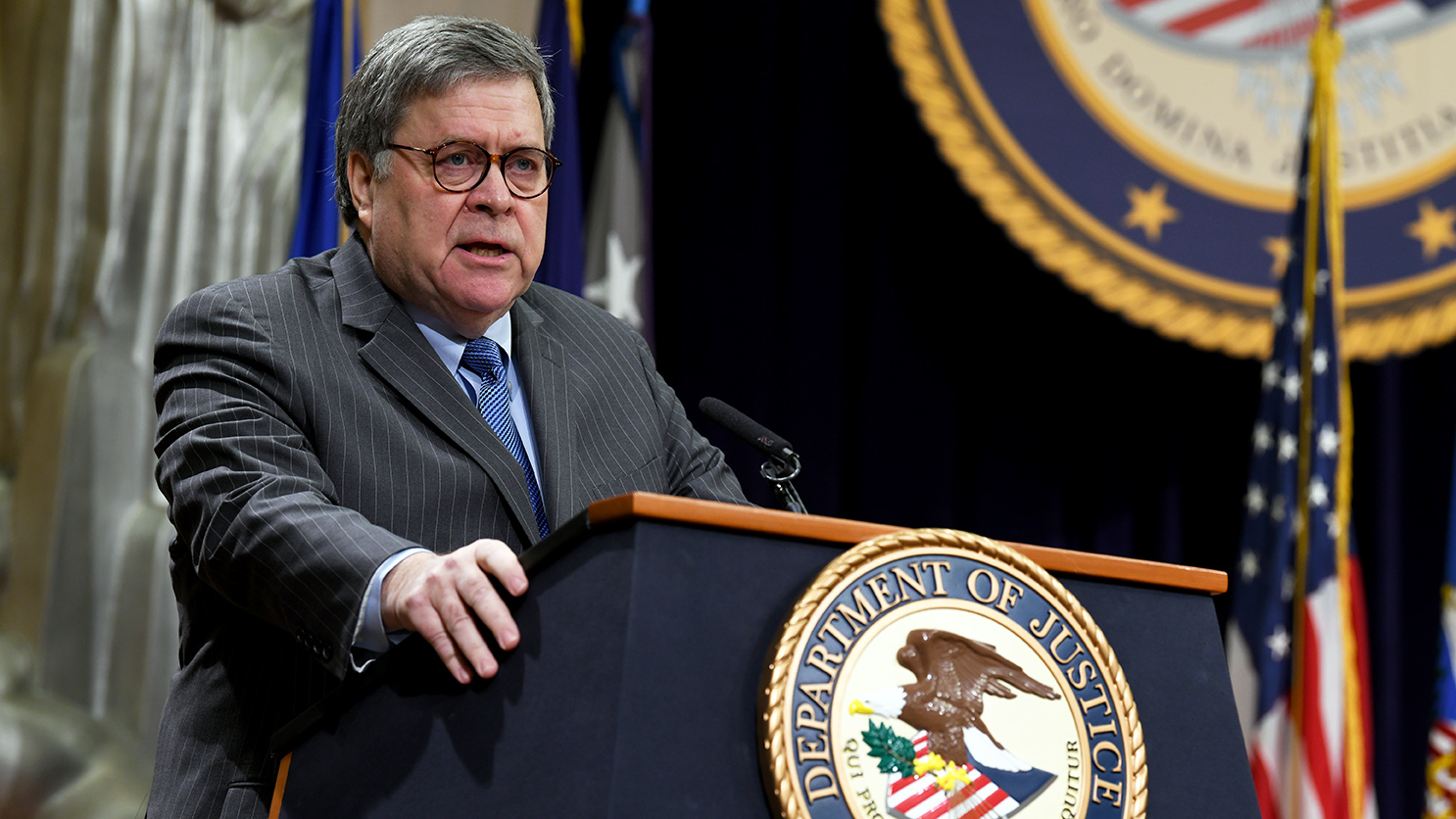
Attorney General William Barr announcing the establishment of the Presidential Commission on Law Enforcement and the Administration of Justice

Boudin campaigned for D.A. on a platform of eliminating cash bail, establishing a unit to re-evaluate wrongful convictions and refusing to assist Immigration and Customs Enforcement (ICE) with raids and arrests. The San Francisco Police Officers Association and other law enforcement groups spent $650,000 in an unsuccessful effort to defeat Boudin. Attorney General William Barr criticized Boudin and like-minded DA's, accusing them of undermining the police, letting criminals off the hook and endangering public safety. In an interview during the COVID-19 pandemic, Boudin questioned whether the nation "can safely continue the national system of mass incarceration. Why do we need to take people to jail for non-violent offenses if what they really need is drug treatment or mental health services?"

== Arguments against mass decarceration ==
=== Need for incapacitation ===
The Manhattan Institute, a pro-free market think tank espousing welfare and tort reform, opposes mass decarceration on the grounds that violent criminals must be incapacitated. Rafael Mangual, the institute's Deputy Director of Legal Policy, argues most inmates are held in state prisons, where a majority of inmates are serving time for violent crimes (murder, assault, rape, robbery or burglary), dwarfing the number of inmates convicted of drug and property crimes. Dramatically reducing the prison population to match the incarceration rates of Western Europe, Mangual argues, would require freeing large numbers of violent and repeat offenders for crimes the American public agrees should lead to incarceration. Reducing or eliminating sentences for violent criminals would endanger society, exposing the American people to criminals who are only likely to commit more violent acts once released.

The Department of Justice in its "2018 Update on Prisoner Recidivism: A 9-Year Follow-up Period (2005–2014)" examined the cumulative percentage of prisoners convicted of violent crimes who, upon release in 2005, were re-arrested during the following nine years for an offense of an equally violent nature.

Findings were as follows:

(2018) Bureau of Justice Statistics-Cumulative recidivism rate/violent offenders committing equally violent acts
1st yr.	2nd yr.	3rd yr.	4th yr.	5th yr.	6th yr.	7th yr.	8th yr.	9th yr.
11%	19%	24.5%	29.6%	34%	36.9%	39.5%	41.7%	43.4%

=== Rebuttal to incapacitation argument for mass incarceration ===
Danielle Sered, author of Until We Reckon: Violence, Incarceration and the Road to Repair serves as the Executive Director of Common Justice, a New York organization that suggests alternatives to prison for those charged with felonies. In her book, Sered writes, "If incarceration worked to secure safety, we would be the safest nation in all of human history. We would not be a nation where, by the most conservative estimates available, every year nearly three thousand young men of color are murdered before their twenty-fifth birthday; more than 57,000 children survive sexual violence; nearly half a million women are beaten in their relationships; nearly three million men are robbed or assaulted ..." In a March 2019, interview on radio show Democracy Now, Sered urged the nation to pursue new solutions—restitution, community service, amends to the victim—to the problem of violent crime, adding that the core drivers of violence: shame, isolation, exposure to violence and economic struggle are only accentuated in prison, perpetuating a criminogenic cycle of violence that allows no one, not the perpetrator nor the victim, to heal.

In "The Prison Paradox: More Incarceration Will Not Make Us Safer" Loyola University (Chicago) criminology professor Don Stemen argues that "in states with high incarceration rates and neighborhoods with concentrated incarceration, the increased use of incarceration may be associated with increased crime" resulting from a breakdown in family bonds, income deficit due to parental incarceration and greater resentment of law enforcement. According to Stemen, there is no evidence to show that higher incarceration rates lower violent crime rates. Whether prison itself is criminogenic is a question debated among criminologists, though Stemen argues prison may perpetuate criminal behavior because in prison inmates learn criminal habits and connect with criminal networks, only to eventually return to their communities without jobs or housing to face families torn asunder.

== Inmate substance use ==
In 2010, the National Center on Addiction and Substance Abuse issued a report on substance abuse among the country's prison and jail populations, noting that "65 percent of the nation's inmates meet certain medical criteria for substance abuse and addiction, but only 11 percent receive treatment for their addictions." The report, lamenting the lack of prison treatment programs as "inane and inhuman", said federal, state and local governments spend less than one percent of their correctional budgets on inmate substance use, even though alcohol and other drugs are common denominators in most crimes, "including 78 percent of violent crimes, 83 percent of property crimes and 77 percent of public order, immigration or weapons offenses as well as probation and parole violations"—with eight out of ten inmates involved to some degree with drugs or alcohol and those with addictions more likely to reoffend.

Susan E. Foster, the Center's Director of Policy Research and Analysis, criticized state governments for failing to address an obvious challenge within and beyond the walls of correctional or carceral institutions. "States complain mightily about their rising prison costs, yet they continue to hemorrhage public funds that could be saved if they provided treatment to inmates with alcohol and other drug problems and stepped up use of drug courts and prosecutorial drug treatment alternative programs." Specifically, the report recommended more substance use programs as alternatives to incarceration; addiction programs for inmates; mental health treatment for inmates with co-occurring mental health problems; follow-up care for released inmates with drug and alcohol addictions.

More recent studies on the relationship between substance use and incarceration also note the lack of mental health resources and call for "smart decarceration" efforts to address substance use disorders.

In a study for recidivism and mortality after in-jail buprenorphine treatment for opioid use disorder conducted by UMass Amherst between 2015 and 2019, a decrease in recidivism was found for those who had received the medication. Two Massachusetts jails, Franklin County Jail and Hampshire County Jail, compared the post-incarceration addiction, recidivism, and mortality rates between a facility that provided buprenorphine and one that did not. Participants from Franklin County Jail, which provided drug treatment, were found to have a lower overall rate of recidivism than Hampshire County Jail (48.2% and 62.5%) and a lower rate of recidivism after the first year of release.

== Adverse childhood experiences ==
In 2013, Kaiser Permanente and Centers for Disease Control conducted a study in which offenders (child abusers, sexual offenders, stalkers) were asked to fill out a questionnaire about adverse childhood experiences (ACEs)—exposure to violence; abuse; living with family members who used substances, mentally ill, suicidal or incarcerated—to determine if adverse childhood experiences (ACE's) played a significant role in mental health problems and criminal behavior. "Offenders reported nearly four times as many adverse events in childhood than an adult male normative sample." In order to decrease criminal recidivism, the study's authors recommended treatment interventions that focus on the ripple effects of early childhood trauma.

Additional research summarized in "Adverse Childhood Experiences and the Lifelong Consequences of Trauma" links ACEs—exposure to an acute event or series of traumatic events without an adequate adult buffer—to risky and destructive adult behavior, mental illness, and substance use, as well as reduced parenting abilities. The American Academy of Pediatrics suggests the salient question to ask dysfunctional adults is not, "What's wrong with you?" but "What happened to you?"

Rates of ACEs were high among inmate populations surveyed in 2012, with one in six male inmates in the U.S. having reported being physically or sexually abused before age 18, even more witnessing interpersonal violence and over half of male inmates reporting childhood physical trauma.

=== Trauma ===
In 2016, psychologist, researcher and writer Stephanie Covington began working with male inmates at California's Corcoran State Prison to address childhood trauma and its impact on the inmates' criminal behavior. The program, titled "Building Resilience", employed cognitive behavioral therapy (CBT), a therapeutic approach to identify triggering events and develop coping skills, in facilitated peer-groups to help inmates understand their early childhood trauma and the wounding effects of their adult traumatization of others. Together with therapist Robert Rodriguez, Covington authored "Exploring Trauma: A Brief Intervention for Men" which became the basis for the "Building Resilience" curriculum that Covington says guides inmates through examining their guilt, shame and anger to construct healthy relationships inside the prison walls and outside once they are released.

Gender differences in the association between trauma, PTSD, and how it relates to the incarceration of women are important considerations in decarceration conversations.

Studies show that women are arrested for qualitatively different crimes. Also, women are more likely to develop PTSD after experiencing trauma, more so than men. Even when those traumas are nonsexual, such as car accidents. A third reason that studies of incarcerated populations give for considering trauma of incarcerated populations of women is that women are more likely to report a history of trauma, particularly emotional, physical, and sexual abuse than male incarcerated populations.

Although women make up only 7 percent of the prison population. Black women are still approximately 6 times more likely to be incarcerated than white women, the same disparities as in male populations, for the reason discussed above (e.g. intense policing of neighborhoods where Blacks live).

Erica Shephard, a survivor of child abuse, domestic violence and multiple rapes is on Death Row in Texas, facing execution. She fled a violent marriage at 19 and sought refuge at a battered women's shelter. The shelter turned her way. Twenty-seven days later, she followed James Dickerson into a house where he robbed and killed a white woman. Erica had three children, was homeless and mentally ill. She had no prior record. The jury never heard of her mental illness, sexual assault or plight as a domestic violence survivor. They did not hear about her childhood, which was plagued by poverty and violence. They never learned about her trauma. With no prior convictions, no prior record. Erica was sentenced to death. She's been on death row for 26 years now, longer than her age when she was sentenced. You can read Erica's story on the Cornell Law School website.

=== Women in prison ===
In addition to working with male inmates, Covington developed a multi-week gender-responsive curriculum for California Institute for Women inmates (and other penal institutions) suffering psychological trauma from abusive relationships (2017)

Although women only constitute 7% of prison and jail inmates in the United States, the incarcerated female population of 231,000 (2019) is growing in recent decades at twice the rate of male incarceration. Even though 80% percent of women (113,000) in jails are mothers and primary caretakers, Yale law professor Judith Resik writes women are incarcerated further from their homes and families than male inmates, only to face the threat of sexual assault by male guards. These anxiety-producing conditions, according to mental health service providers, can compound pre-existing trauma experienced by female inmates, who are more likely than their male counterparts to have been the victims of physical or sexual abuse.

=== Comparison of female vs. male prison inmates ===
(Published at National Resource Center on Justice Involved Women, based on statistics from 2005 to 2015)

	Women	Men
Type of offense	Mostly commit property (28%) and drug offenses (24%) (Carson, 2015); About 1/3 are violent offenses(Carson, 2015), which are often targeted at a close relative or intimate partner (Van Dieten, Jones, & Rondon, 2014)	Less than half are property (19%) and drug-related (15%) (Carson, 2015); More than half (54%) commit violent acts (Carson, 2015
Type of trauma	Most common experiences include child and adult sexual violence and intimate partner violence (Miller & Najavits, 2012)	Most common past traumas include witnessing someone being killed or seriously hurt, and being physically attacked. (Miller & Najavits, 2012)
Relationships	Sense of self-worth is based on their connections with others (Bloom, Owen, & Covington, 2003)	Sense of self-worth defined by drive to become self-sufficient and autonomous (Bloom, Owen, & Covington, 2003)
Family role	Two-thirds of women in state prisons are mothers of a minor child (The Sentencing Project, 2015)	Less likely to act as the primary caretaker of children (The Sentencing Project, 2007)

According to Covington, women in custody are five times more likely than men to wrestle with mental health challenges, one in three female inmates is a victim of sexual abuse, more than one in two a victim of domestic violence and half tried to commit suicide. Covington believes in the ideal world only a handful of the most dangerous women inmates would be confined in prisons and jails; those who had been victimized would learn to live in the general population, grounding themselves in the present and learning to self-soothe.

The "Beyond Trauma" female gender-specific trauma therapy curriculum includes:

- Educating inmates about abuse; they may be unaware that they were victimized
- Normalizing reactions (It's okay to feel anger and resentment.) to abnormal abusive behavior
- Creating a safe environment to develop self-soothing skills to better cope with challenging behavior and avoid being re-triggered
- Affirming boundaries

Formal evaluation of trauma-informed therapy in correctional institutions is limited, though in a 2016 UCLA-sponsored pooled study of three sample groups (one using Covington's CBT curriculum) of racially diverse incarcerated women with an average of 14 prior arrests and exposure to at least two traumatic events (assault by a family member or stranger, serious/life-threatening accident or illness), social scientists Christine Grella and Nena Messina concluded gender-responsive trauma-based cognitive behavioral therapy showed significant improvements for the participants on scales measuring self-efficacy, substance use and community re-entry, stressing the importance of a continuing care model involving treatment in prison and upon release."

The Bureau of Prisons, at its women's prison in Danbury, Connecticut, offered a gender-responsive trauma treatment program.

== State laws and mandates to decarcerate ==
=== Brown v. Plata: California ordered to reduce state prison population ===
In 2011, the U.S. Supreme Court ruled in Brown v. Plata that California's overcrowded penitentiaries violated the Eighth Amendment's protections against cruel and unusual punishment. Built to house 85,000 inmates, the state prison population numbered 156,000, almost twice the appropriate amount in facilities where "lines for prison health clinics often snake 50 men deep" and "prison gymnasiums and classrooms are packed with three-tier prisoners' bunks." Upholding an order issued by a three-judge panel in a prisoner class action lawsuit, the Court ordered California to reduce its prison population by 46,000 inmates. In its decision, the Court concluded that overcrowding was the main cause for the inmates' inferior medical and mental health care. To comply with the ruling, the California Department of Corrections and Rehabilitation (CDCR) sent inmates to private prisons in other states like Mississippi, transferred inmates back to local jails, diverted inmates to rehabilitation and treatment programs and halted incarceration of parolees for noncriminal technical parole violations.

=== Mandatory minimums ===
Since the prison expansion era, 23 states have enacted laws to either revise downward mandatory minimum sentences or repeal laws related to non-violent offenses, such as drug use and sale. In addition, states have increased opportunities to earn good-time credit for early release and established specialized courts to sentence defendants to rehabilitation and treatment, rather than prison, for crimes resulting from mental health, domestic violence or drug problems. While some states like New York and New Jersey decreased their prison population, other states such as Louisiana and Alabama increased their incarceration rates.

Advocates of decarceration credit Maryland's 2016 Justice Reinvestment Act for dramatically reducing the state's incarceration rate. Under the legislation, nonviolent offenders are diverted from prison into drug treatment and other programs and mandatory minimums for drug offenses are eliminated.

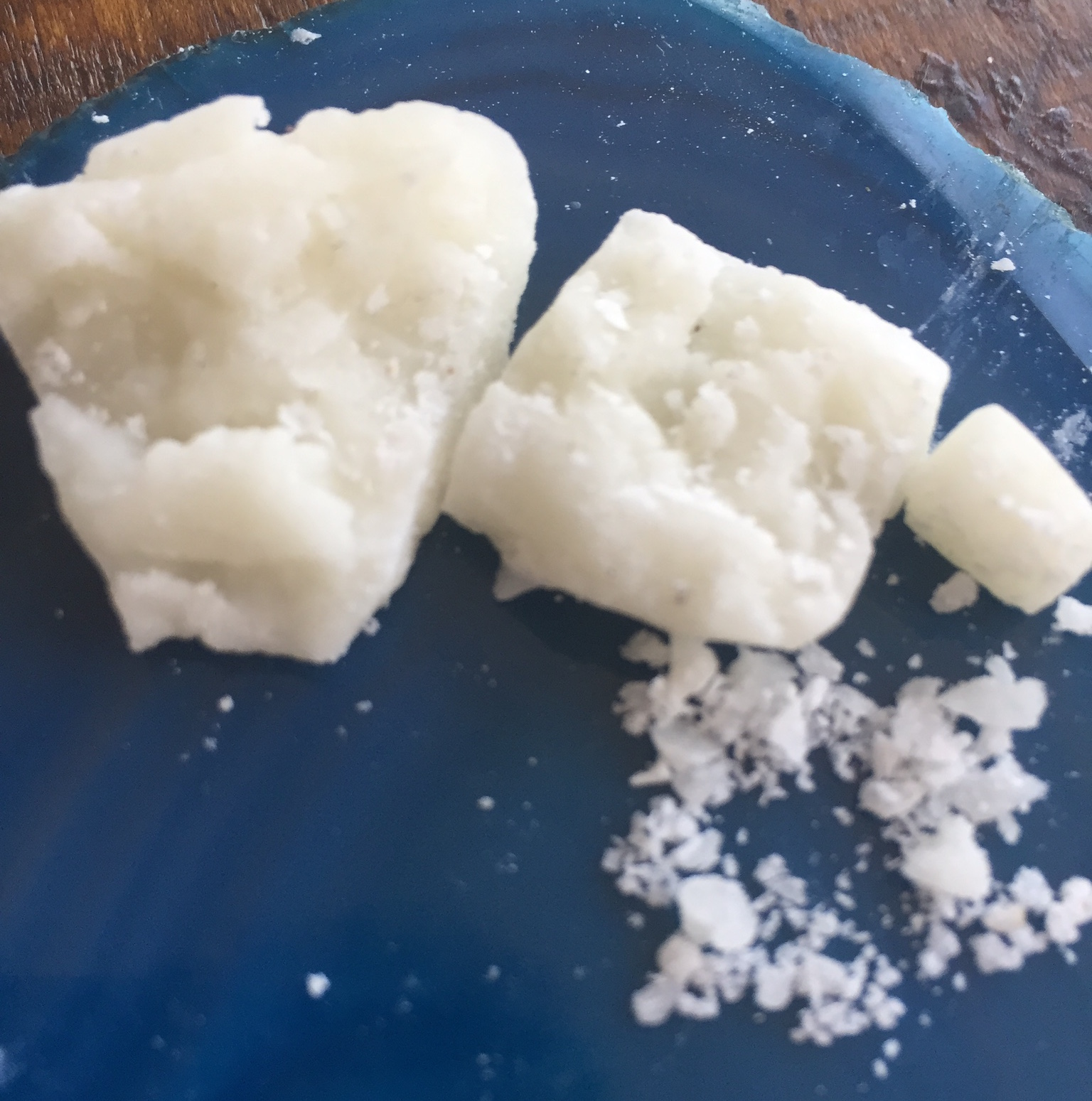
Two grams of crack cocaine

The First Step Act, signed by President Trump in 2018, allowed for the expedited release of around 30,000 inmates from federal prison. Some were terminally ill prisoners released under compassionate release. Some continue to serve out the remainder of their original sentence at home under the "home confinement" provisions of the act. Around 4,000 were released when the crack cocaine sentencing reform provisions of the Fair Sentencing Act of 2010 were given retroactive effect.

== Types of decarceration reforms ==
=== Smart Justice Campaign ===
In 2018, the American Civil Liberties Union launched the ACLU Smart Justice Campaign, a multi-year initiative to cut the U.S. prison population in half while addressing what it called racial disparities that in 2014 found the incarceration rate disproportionate for African Americans, with Black men incarcerated at nearly six times the rate of white men, and Black women incarcerated at twice the rate of white women. The campaign unveiled 50-State Blueprints, a "comprehensive, state-by-state analysis of how states can transform their criminal justice system and cut incarceration in half," noting that each state is different so a "one size fits all approach" will not be effective. Blueprint reforms include:

- Diversion for drug possession
- Reduction of average time served for various offenses
- Implementation of restorative justice programs to reduce juvenile confinement
- Publication of prosecution data to surface racial disparities

=== The Sentencing Project ===
The Sentencing Project, a non-profit criminal justice reform organization, highlights front end reforms "decreased prison admissions" and "reductions in criminal penalties" as key decarceration strategies adopted by Connecticut, Michigan and Rhode Island, all states that in 2016 had reduced their prison populations and decriminalized marijuana.

=== Decriminalization of marijuana ===
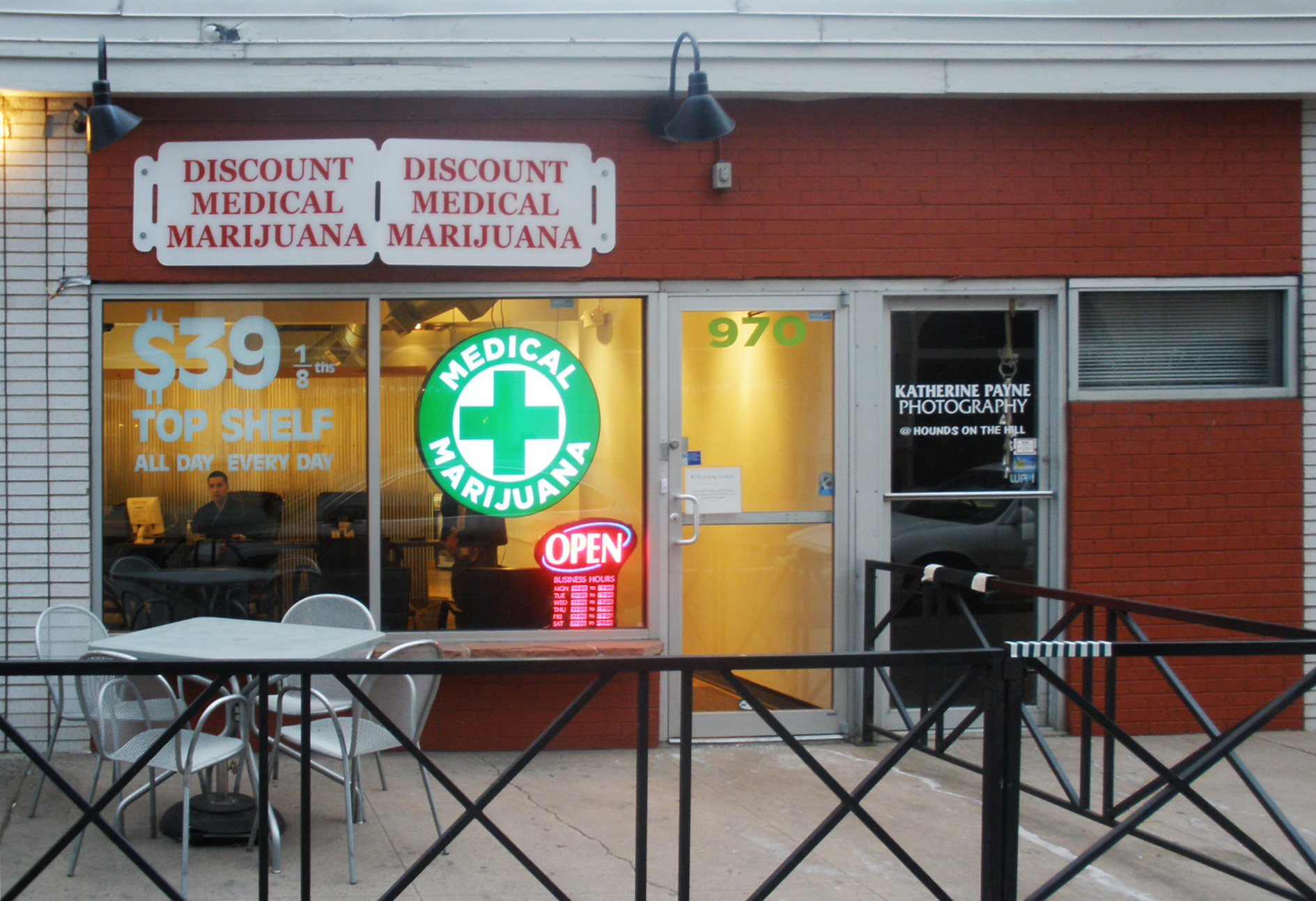
Medical marijuana shop in Denver, Colorado

In response to public outcries over the criminalization, arrest and incarceration of marijuana-related offenses, 50 localities and dozens of states—including Alaska, California, Colorado, Delaware, Illinois, Maine, Massachusetts, Mississippi, Missouri and Nebraska—have either legalized or decriminalized marijuana possession—often resulting in no arrest, prison time, or criminal record for the first-time possession of a small amount of marijuana for personal use. Despite the changes in state laws with a majority legalizing medical marijuana, marijuana remains illegal under federal law, the Controlled Substances Act (CSA) (21 U.S.C. § 811), which classifies cannabis as a highly addictive Schedule I drug (joining heroin and cocaine on that list) of no medical value that carries a possible misdemeanor or felony charge regardless of the amount of possession or sale.

According to the FBI, arrests for marijuana nationwide were on the rise in 2018, even though many states had legalized or decriminalized its use. Recreational marijuana use and sale was still illegal in most states.

The American Civil Liberties Union—charging Blacks are almost four times as likely as whites to be arrested for marijuana use—calls not only for legalization of marijuana but also expungement of drug offenses from criminal records, with reinvestment of public dollars in the communities most damaged as a result of the war on drugs, a government initiative that dramatically increased the sentences for drug use and sale.

David Mineta, Deputy Director with the government's National Drug Control Policy, says the criminalization of drug use and sale serves more than a punitive purpose. "Penalties, or even the threat of them, frequently spur individuals struggling with addiction or substance use to get the treatment they might never seek or receive on their own." Mineta points out that referrals to substance use recovery programs are often the result of court referrals. Law enforcement opponents of marijuana legalization argue recreational users too often drive under the influence, risking roadside safety, and that legalization creates a criminal black market for distributors exporting marijuana to states where it is still illegal.

=== Bail reform ===
Proponents of eliminating cash bail for misdemeanors and non-violent offenses argue cash bail creates two tiers of justice. One is for the rich who can either pay the bail themselves or pay a bonds person a percentage, 10–15% in cash, the rest in collateral, to put up the bail. The other is for poor people—often marginalized people of color—who struggle to pay rent and cannot afford to pay bail or a bonds person, leaving the less advantaged to live behind bars for days before being charged with a crime, and for months, even years, while they wait to be charged and tried in court. According to the non-profit Prison Policy Initiative, in 2016, 70% of the 646,000 people locked up in more than 3,000 local jails throughout the U.S were being detained pretrial. Advocates of no cash bail argue that money should not determine who can be released and who must remain behind bars, but whether the court deems the defendant's release poses a risk to the community's safety. The American Bar Association states, "Deprivation of liberty pending trial is harsh and oppressive, subjects defendants to economic and psychological hardship, interferes with their ability to defend themselves, and, in many instances, deprives their families of support.

An alternative to cash bail enables judges to release defendants on their own recognizance, sometimes conditioning the release on the defendant's participation in a diversion program, but requiring the defendant to sign an agreement promising to show up in court as required or face possible arrest or fine.

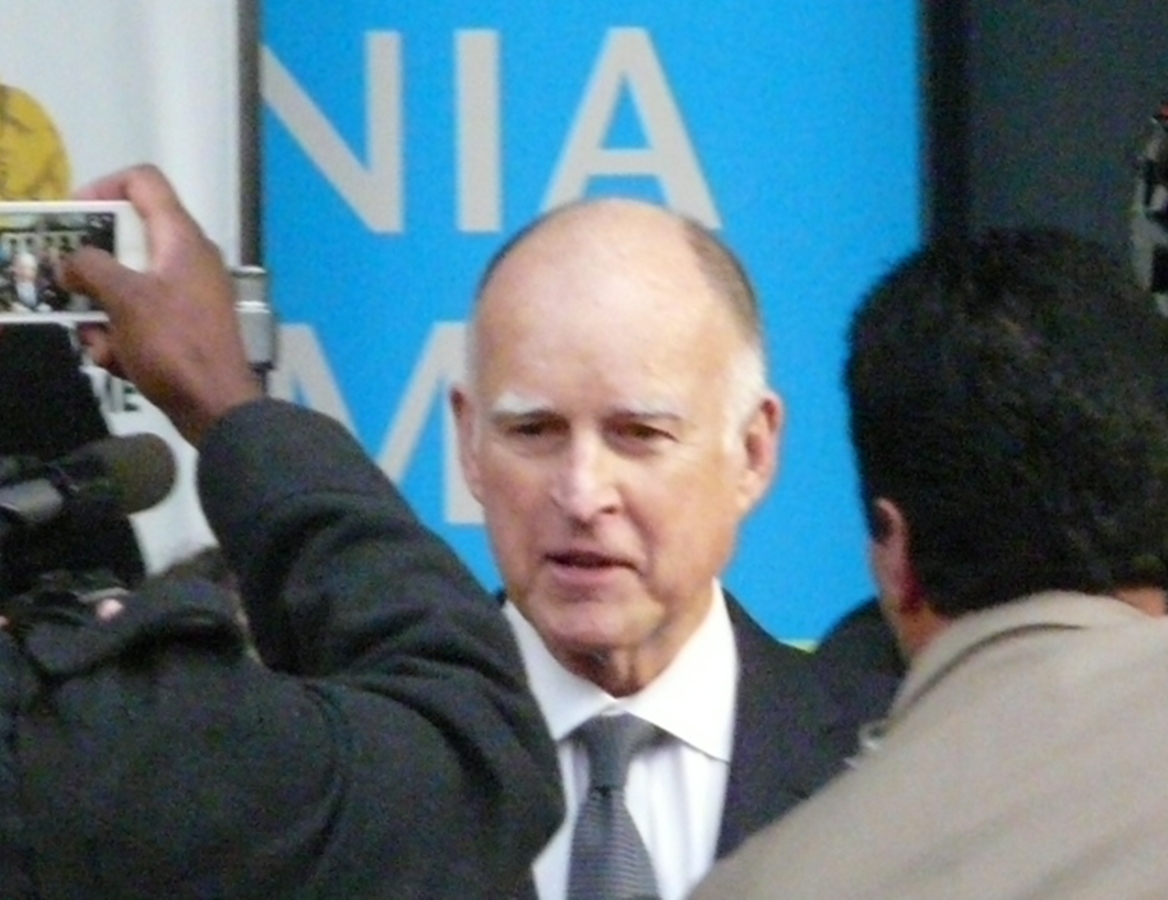
Former California Governor Jerry Brown signed major bail reform legislation.

On August 28, 2018, California Governor Jerry Brown signed into law the California Money Bail Reform Act, which directs local courts to rely on risk assessment tools, not cash bail, to decide whether to release felony arrestees on their own recognizance. Additionally, the law says the courts, with few exceptions, must allow pre-trial release for those arrested or detained for misdemeanors. Opponents of the act qualified a referendum for the November 2020 ballot to overturn the law that replaced bail for misdemeanors with a system based on public safety risk. Referendum supporters charge the bail reform law affords judges too much discretion in determining if bail is necessary and allows dangerous criminals to re-enter the community.

For most misdemeanors and nonviolent felonies, judges in New York are required to release people with the "least restrictive conditions necessary to reasonably assure" the person will appear in court on a specified date. For misdemeanors and non-violent crimes, cash bail is prohibited, unless the crimes involve sex trafficking, sex offenses, witness tampering, child pornography, vehicular assault or a charge that is alleged to have resulted in the death of another person. In other cases, it is a matter of judicial discretion to release or detain people, with or without pretrial conditions, such as electronic monitoring, participation in drug treatment programs or payment of bail.

On December 2, 2020, Hennepin County Attorney, Mike Freeman, announced that beginning January 1, 2021, he would no longer request bail for 19 felony level crimes including: fifth degree possession or sale of narcotics, dishonored check, and counterfeiting currency.

=== Economic justice ===
Decarceration advocates charge that prison guards unions have fueled escalating incarceration rates by contributing to initiative campaigns to repeal bail and parole reform. as well as to politicians who support tough on crime legislation, increased pay for guards and prison expansion. To address correctional officers union's concerns about job security, advocates of decarceration posit that "ensuring economic justice for those who lose their jobs, must go hand and hand with curtailing incarceration" and call on the government to ensure mass employment and job guarantees for displaced workers.

=== Green new deal for decarceration ===
In 2019, proponents of decarceration allied themselves with environmentalists to oppose the construction of a new prison on a mountaintop in Letcher County, Kentucky, jointly celebrating when the Trump administration deleted from its proposed 2020 budget $500 million to build the prison in Appalachia. In AJPH, a publication of the American Public Health Association, assistant professors Brett Story and Seth Prins write, "The devastation wrought by blowing up mountaintops to extract buried fossil fuels parallels the community ruin caused by forcibly removing residents from their neighborhoods to be warehoused in massive, faraway, high-security institutions." In their article "Connecting the Dots Between Mass Incarceration, Health Inequity, and Climate Change", the authors call for an alliance between opponents of mass incarceration and environmentalists to support a Green New Deal for decarceration that would redirect money for prisons and jails into housing and mental health. For rural cities and towns—where prisoners outnumber farmers and incarceration brings jobs to depressed coal mining areas, Story and Prins argue the economic benefits of prisons are questionable, fostering a dependence on carceral institutions and increased incarceration rates to the detriment of developing a more diverse economy.

=== Specialty courts ===
The Sentencing Project noted the "creation or expansion of specialty courts and/or other alternatives to incarceration" as one activity that helped several states to reduce their prison populations by between 14% and 25% over the course of a decade.

The State of Michigan in a 2018 report described its 188 problem solving courts as vehicles to provide substance use treatment, mental health and intense supervision as alternatives to sentencing offenders to state prison or local jails. In lauding the success of the problem-solving drug courts, the report notes that of the 2,984 2018 participants in a drug or sobriety program 65 percent had successfully completed the treatment, while 29 percent were discharged because they did not follow the rules or committed a new offense. Maintaining a steady job was a critical factor in whether the participants were successful. Graduates of the drug courts were two times less likely to be convicted of a new crime during the following three years.

Michigan's drug courts have changed over time to include a variety of models:

- Drug courts that address drug-related non-drunk driving felonies (Ten Key Components of Drug Courts)
- Sobriety courts that only take offenders driving under the influence (Ten Guiding Principles of Sobriety Courts)
- Hybrid courts using both an adult drug court and sobriety court model
- Juvenile drug court
- Healing to Wellness courts, with a cultural awareness component, in Native American communities
- Family dependency courts target child abuse and neglect cases involving parental substance use

=== Probation and parole reform ===
Decarceration advocates refer to "prison churn" or the revolving door in which at least one in four people who go to jail are arrested again within the same year—often those struggling with mental illness, substance use and poverty, problems that only worsen with prison time. Technical violations of probation or parole—missing an appointment with a parole officer, staying out past curfew, unpaid fees or fines—are the primary reasons for recidivism.

In response to the outsized role of technical violations, California implemented Senate Bill 678, which gives grants to county probation departments to implement restorative justice programs to reduce the number of people on probation who are sent back to prison.

The Chronicle for Social Changes, a non-partisan criminal justice news publication, reports that in the first year of implementation, the state probation violation rate declined by 23 percent or 6,182 prisoners, saving the state $179 million.

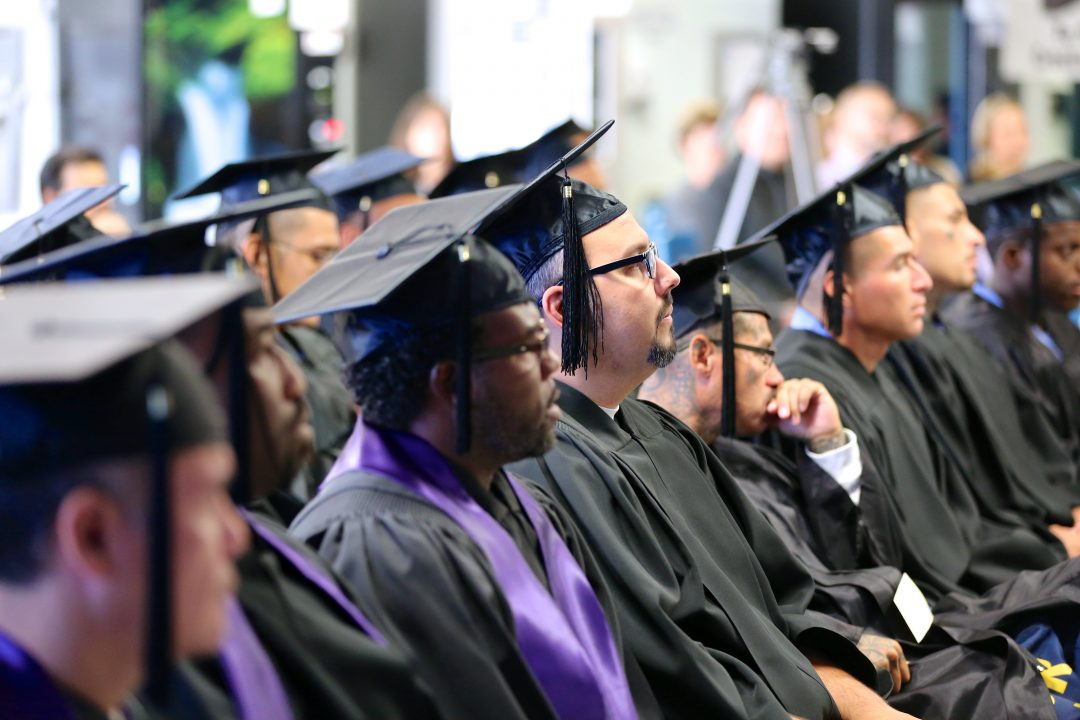
Creekside Adult School graduation ceremony at Mule Creek State Prison in northern California

=== Re-entry programs ===
In 2012, researchers with the Indiana Department of Corrections conducted a longitudinal five-year (2005–2009) follow-up study to analyze the role of an offender's education and post-release employment on recidivism among various categories of offenders (i.e., violent, non-violent, sex, and drug offenders). The research involved 6,561 offenders, which constituted 43.2 percent of a total of 15,184 offenders released from the Indiana Department of Correction. Research results revealed that recidivist offenders were more likely to be unemployed or under-educated—and that the employment status, age, and education level were the most significant predictors of recidivism, regardless of whether the offender had been convicted of a non-violent or violent offense. Of utmost importance was the offender's level of formal education because that was a critical factor in obtaining and sustaining employment to prevent a return to prison. The "post-release recidivism rate among offenders who had an education below high school was 56.4 percent among violent offenders, 56.8 percent among nonviolent offenders, 63.6 percent among sex offenders, and 51.7 percent among drug offenders."

In 2018, the Trump Administration's Department of Justice issued a skeptical review of the success of job-based re-entry programs, calling for randomized control trials to prove the effectiveness of programs touted as successful in reducing recidivism. The reviewer, David B. Muhlhausen, head of the National Institute of Justice—the research, development, and evaluation arm of the U.S. Department of Justice—identified several potential case management alternatives to job based re-entry programs, commenting, however, that more rigorous research and evaluation was needed to evaluate the efficacy of the case management programs.

== Black Women Working to Advance Healing Centered Justice ==
There are many nonprofit groups who deal with the issues of prison prevention for women and recidivism and create pathways that steer Black women and girls away from prison.

The National Black Women's Justice Institute (NBWJI) is one of them. It is an evidence and data-driven Black women-led (and Black voice-centered) national nonprofit "that leads research, capacity building, and public education to advance healing-centered policies and practices that dismantle pathways to criminalization and confinement...for Black women and girls who are directly impacted by the criminal and juvenile legal systems." They believe intersectionality is critical for eliminating racial and gender bias in the criminal legal system, and that creating opportunities for healing is the true meaning of justice.

The NBWJI conducts rigorous research that brings the experiences of Black women and girls affected by the criminal legal system to the forefront. (Note, they do not call it the criminal justice system because they believe true justice comes from healing.) The data and analysis provided by the organization are critically used by advocates, organizations, and policymakers "seeking to develop and implement programmatic and policy solutions centering the needs and experiences of Black women and girls" who have been affected by the criminal legal system.

Black women working on behalf of Black women are doing the work. However, more of the practices and suggestions they have learned from experience need to be implemented.

More than 26% of people arrested are Black; more than double our share of the total general population. Although there is much data and research about this, most of it focuses on the experiences of Black men. Given that in recent decades the incarceration rates of Black women have doubled the pace of Black men, it's critical that we examine more closely the experiences of Black women and the criminal legal system, particularly Black women who are serving extreme sentences, as they are often overlooked.

== Prison abolitionists ==
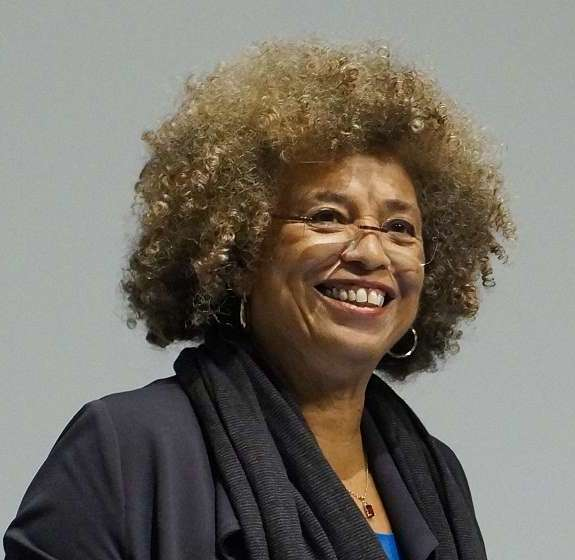
Angela Davis, author of Are Prisons Obsolete?

Led predominantly by modern-day Black feminists, the prison abolition movement was inspired, in part, by former UCLA professor and activist Angela Davis, who wrote and published a book in 2003 titled Are Prisons Obsolete?, which argues that the explosion of prisons and inmate populations are due, not to escalating crime rates which have declined in the last decades, but to institutionalized racism and racial scapegoating for economic woes. Incarceration becomes a vehicle, according to Davis, for theft of civil rights, particularly voting rights as an increasing number of African Americans are denied the right to vote in prison, and even after their release if they are convicted felons.

As evidence that prison abolitionism is gaining traction as a movement, advocates point to the creation of Critical Resistance, an organization that "seeks to build an international movement to end the prison industrial complex," the 2015 National Lawyers Guild passage of a prison abolition resolution and the Democratic Socialists of America (DSA) solidarity with Black Lives Matter in adoption of a platform calling for participating budgeting that divests from policing to invest in community resources, such as parks and housing. In the words of the New York City DSA chapter, "The work of prison abolition is the work of building a world in which we make prisons and police obsolete."

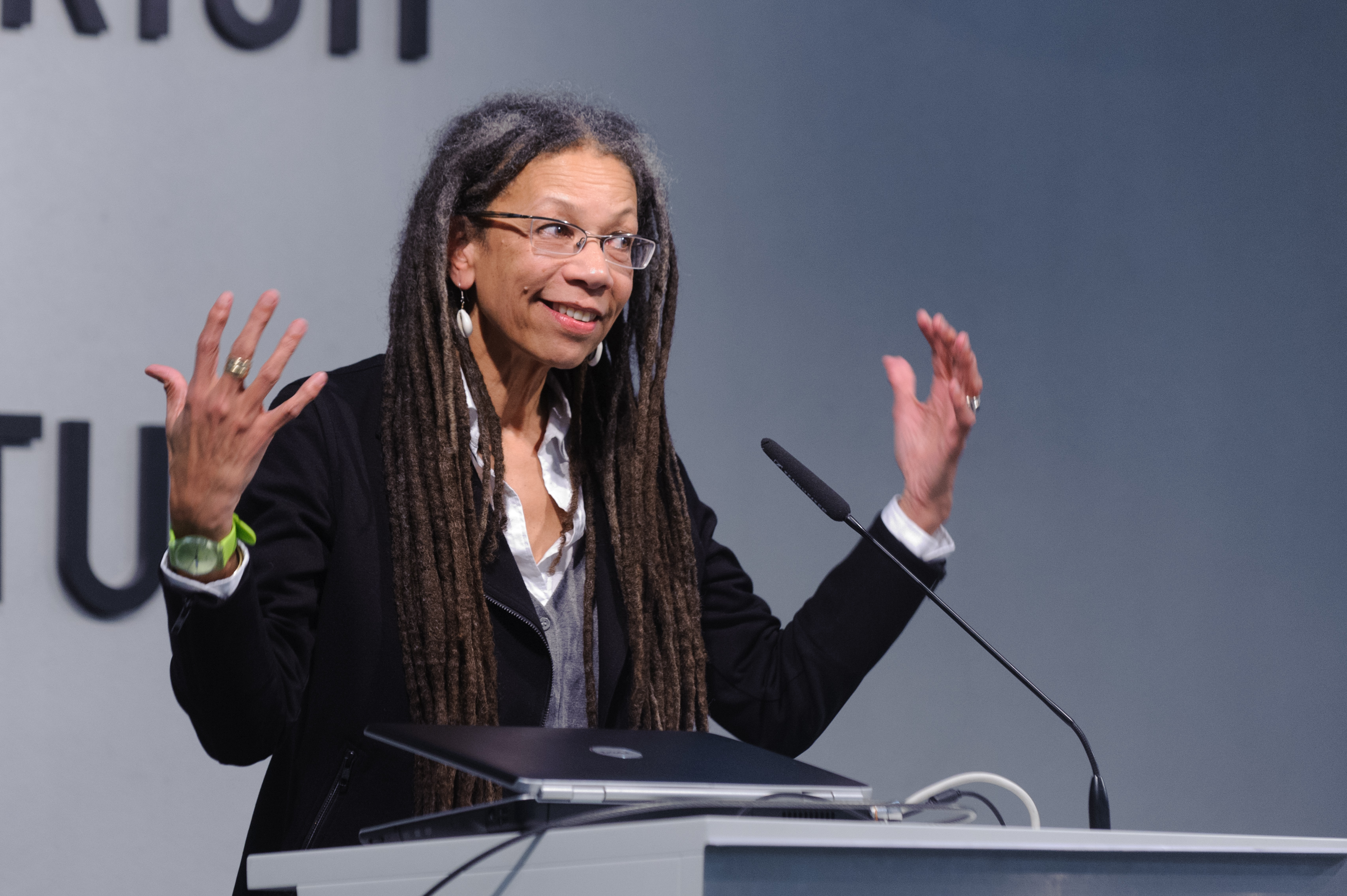
Ruth Wilson Gilmore, abolitionist and prison scholar, speaking at a conference in Berlin, Germany

Prison abolitionists—embracing the slogan "Stop, Shrink, Build"—challenge the use of punishment as a means of protecting society or making redress, pushing for the implementation of restorative and transformative justice programs in schools and counties to address crime prevention, justice and healing. Abolitionists, such as New York University professor Ruth Wilson Gilmore, author of Golden Gulag: Prisons, Surplus, Crisis, and Opposition in Globalizing California (2007), reject the presumption that some prisoners are good but others evil, that some deserve to be freed while others spend years behind bars, that prisons and jails are here to stay forever to insulate society from bad people and incapacitate violent criminals—or that "concrete steel cages" are solutions to social problems. Most people in prison, Gilmore says, will eventually be released, so society must not abandon violent offenders if the hope is to prevent future criminal behavior. In response to skeptics who argue prisons are needed to protect society against recidivist violent criminals, Gilmore says abolitionists do not expect to bulldoze prisons tomorrow, but to work on the entire ecology—health care, education, housing—that shapes a "precarious existence".

United States president, Joe Biden, has also called for the shutdown of private prisons. An executive order was issued on January 26, 2021, to halt the renewal of government contracts with private prisons. It is argued that these private prisons earn additional funding from the government by incarcerating more and holding prisoners for long periods of time, which influenced President Biden to order for the shutdown of said privately owned prisons.

=== Restorative justice ===
Restorative justice, adopted in schools and communities, rejects traditional retributive punishment—suspension, expulsion, humiliation—to focus on the rehabilitation of offenders through reconciliation with victims and the larger community that was harmed. In response to efforts to improve school safety through the use of metal detectors, video cameras, random backpack sweeps, uniformed police and referrals to other law enforcement in what critics term the "school-to-prison pipeline", large school districts in Los Angeles, Oakland and Denver, among others, have shifted from suspension and expulsions to restorative justice. Predicated on the belief that offenders can transform to become better people, the reconciliation process involves bringing the victim, offender and community members, professionals and volunteers, together to talk about what happened from multiple points of view and to create consensus on what the offender can do to make up for the harm caused and prevent similar future offenses and destructive patterns of behavior. Elements of restorative justice programs may also include: teen court, family conferencing, community-building circles, formal apologies, community service or personal service to the victim.

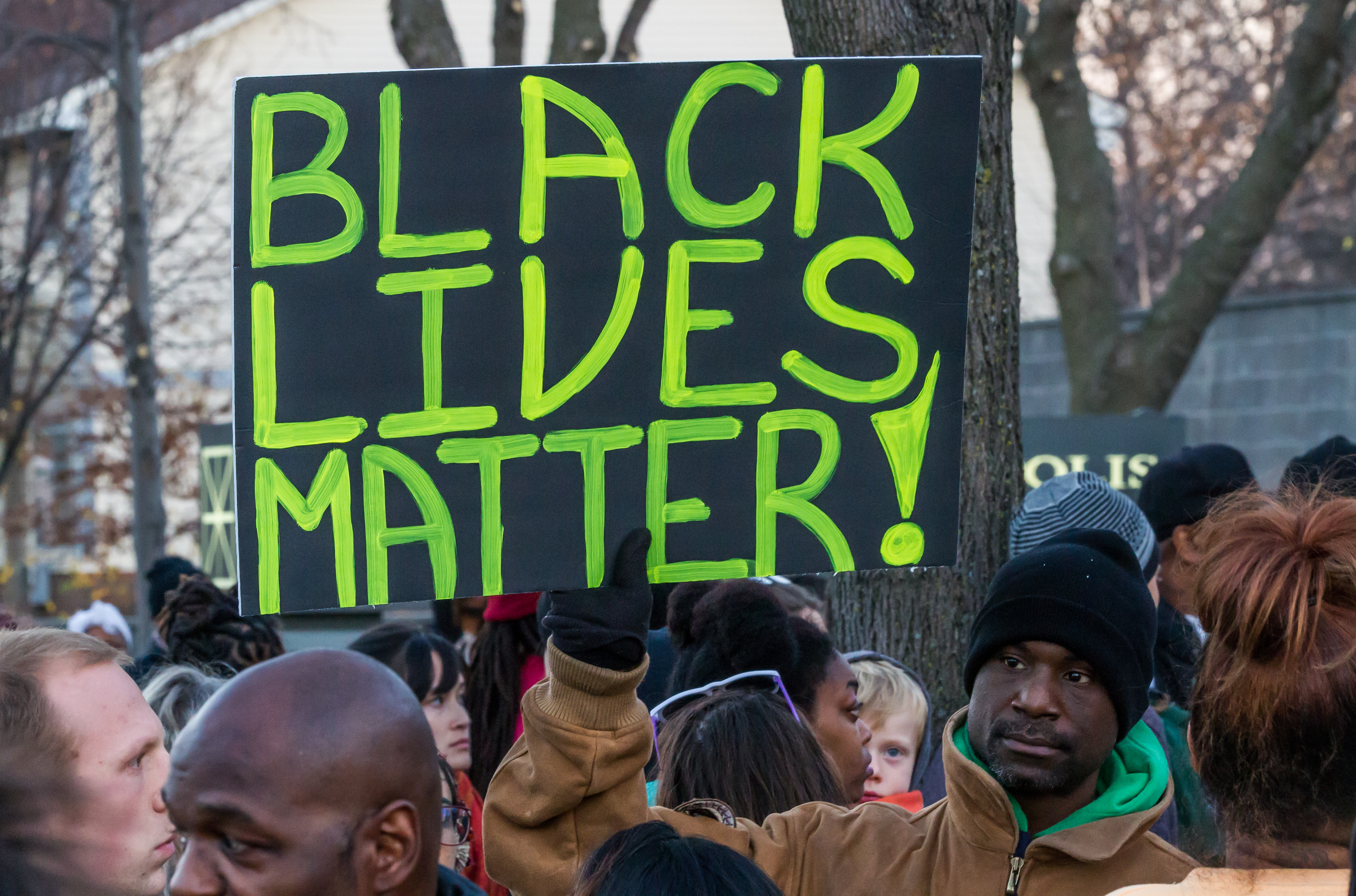
Minneapolis Protest of Officer Shooting of Jamar Clark, November 15, 2015

Restorative justice advocates say the process allows victims to exercise an active role in the resolution process, thus reducing feelings of anxiety and powerlessness.

=== Black Lives Matter at Schools ===
One of the 13 guiding principles of the Black Lives Matter movement is a commitment to restorative justice. Activists with Black Lives Matter at Schools, a coalition of students, teachers, parents and community members, want to end school zero tolerance policies that expel students for a single disruptive incident, and instead promote restorative justice. Black Lives Matter at Schools organized a national week of action in February 2018, to teach lessons about "structural racism" and the school to prison pipeline that it described as "more invested in locking up youth than in unlocking their minds."

=== Evaluations of restorative justice ===
In 2019, The West Ed Justice and Research Center published an evaluation of restorative justice after conducting a "comprehensive review" of research, interviewing experts and administering a survey to educators in the schools. The Center concluded published research "lacks the internal validity necessary to exclusively attribute outcomes" to restorative justice. The Center added, however, that preliminary evidence suggests the program may improve outcomes related to discipline, attendance, graduation, climate, and culture.

A Department of Justice 2017 study, "Effectiveness of Restorative Justice", concluded restorative justice programs demonstrated a moderate reduction in future delinquent behavior when compared to more traditional punitive juvenile approaches.

=== Transformative justice ===
Advocates of transformative justice believe government responses to crime—prisons, jails, police, courts—often lead to more violence, traumatizing what they describe as marginalized communities of color already targeted by the police. One of the tenets of transformative justice is that society must accept collective responsibility for violent crime; individuals are not born knowing how to murder, rape or torture–these are learned behaviors, not the product of a few "bad apples".

The relationship between adverse childhood experiences, violence, and sex was examined using a nationally representative sample...The data supported a linear trajectory, meaning increased childhood trauma was associated with increased risk for violence. Although men endorsed more violent behavior, the relationship between ACEs and violence was significantly stronger among women.

Rather than rely on a system that reproduces more violence inside the prisons and jails, as well outside in the community, advocates of transformative justice say they hope to prevent crime by addressing the social conditions that undergird criminal behavior while building the capacity of individuals and communities to address inequality and injustice.

Activists with Generation Five, an organization working to end inter-generational child sexual abuse, write in their 2007 report "Toward Transformative Justice" of the importance of survivor empowerment, public education, prevention and "cross movement building" in ending child abuse. The report stresses the significant role of the collective—a group of select community members engaged in ending child abuse by naming and defining child abuse, raising consciousness about what constitutes child abuse, developing a personal safety strategy for the child (food, shelter, freedom from physical abuse), as well as a political safety strategy (freedom from deportation, racist, sexist and homophobic attacks), an economic safety strategy (access to money) and public safety strategy (protection from the state and community violence), holding the child abuser accountable (amends) and supporting healing for all those involved in a specific case.

=== Justice reinvestment ===
Increased prison and jail populations, and the attendant costs to house inmates who, according to the Department of Justice (2010), too often return to prison within three years, has spurred lawmakers to tap into federal dollars under the Justice Reinvestment Initiative to rethink ever-expanding correctional budgets that consume dollars needed for other state priorities. Hence, the data-driven policy of justice reinvestment has gained traction, with states increasing funding for community programs—housing, substance use treatment, employment training, and family support for released offenders—that reduce recidivism and end crime. State Legislatures magazine reports a dozen states that pursued justice reinvestment have reduced their prison and jail populations, with Alabama, Idaho, Mississippi, Nebraska and Utah implementing reforms in 2014 and 2015 that collectively avoided estimated costs of more than $1.7 billion over the next 20 years. Darris Young, a former 17-year prison inmate and organizer with the Oakland-based Ella Baker Center—a group behind the "Books not Bars" network to close California's youth prisons—worked on the Justice Reinvestment Initiative to fund counseling, housing, employment and life skills training for offenders re-entering their community. "Why not invest in the resources that will help give people dignity and pride? If you have a stake in your community, you're less likely to be trying to tear down your community," said Young.

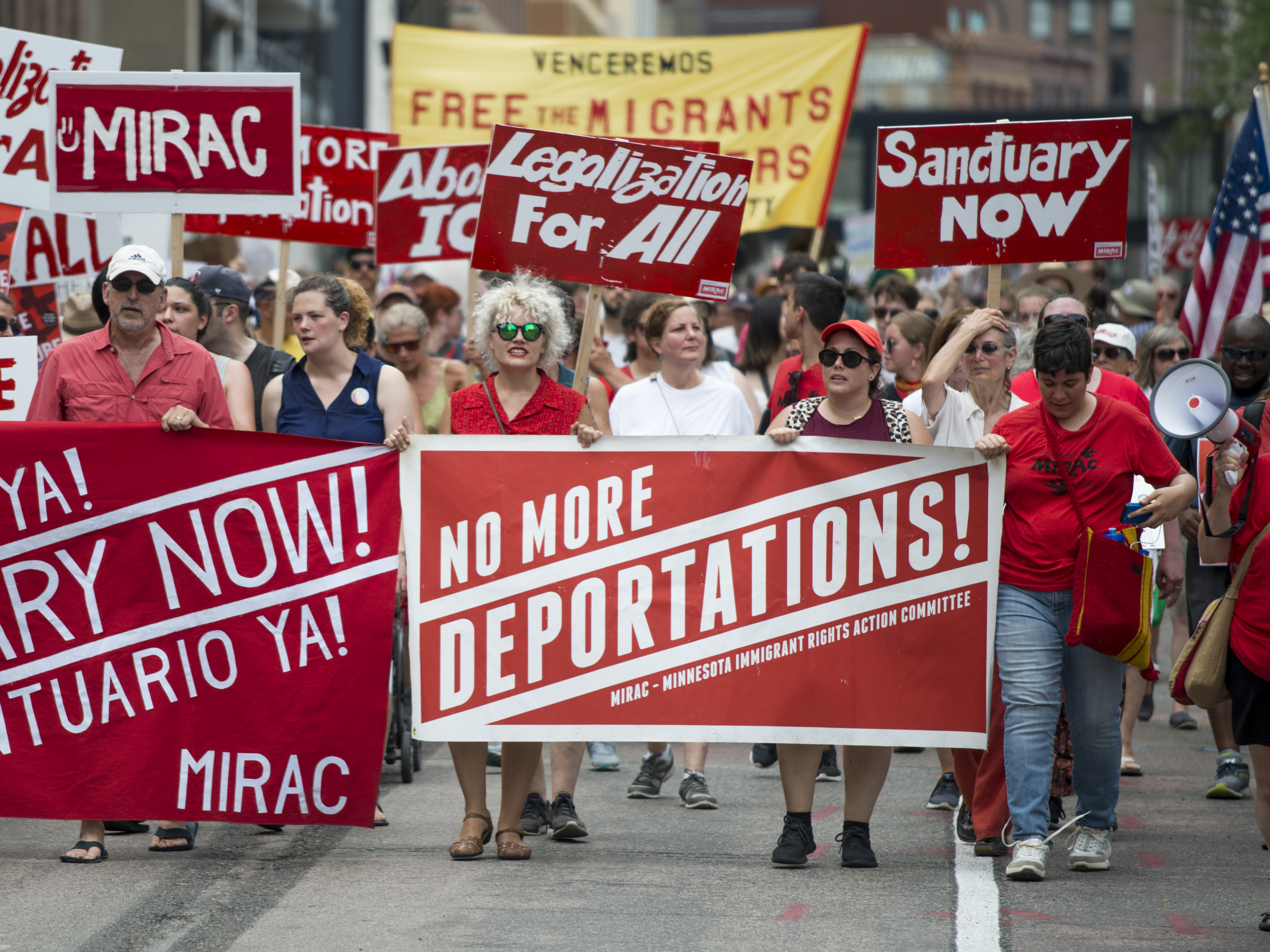
Abolish ICE Protest, Minneapolis, Minnesota, June 30, 2018

=== Movement to abolish ICE and divest from its contractors ===
While some decarceration proponents call for reducing the number of detainees in federal detention centers that detain 50,165 immigrants on an average day, other decarceration advocates want the detention centers closed and ICE abolished, charging that immigrant detention, an historic anomaly, strips migrants of their dignity.

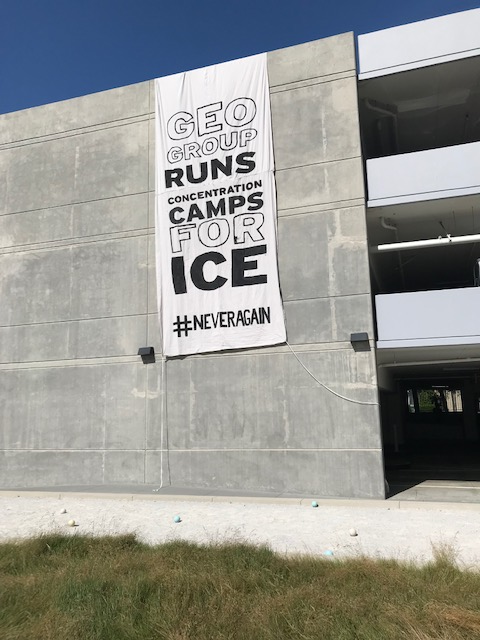
Sign hoisted by#Never Again during protest outside GEO Group's Century City office building in Los Angeles. August 5, 2019.

Demands to abolish the agency gained traction in the summer of 2018, at the height of public outrage over the Trump administration's "zero tolerance" immigration policy that led to thousands of children separated, some permanently, from their mothers and fathers at the U.S-Mexico border. Calls to abolish ICE, the agency that works with the U.S. Border Patrol to implement the Trump Administration's deportation orders, grew louder as New York Representative Alexandria Ocasio-Cortez rode to victory over an entrenched Democratic Party incumbent on the issue of immigrant rights. Declared Ocasio-Cortez, "It's time to abolish ICE, clear the path to citizenship, and protect the rights of families to remain together."

While most prisons are government-run facilities, ICE relies on private profit-making corporations to operate detention centers. ICE spent over $6 billion in 2019 to contract with publicly traded GEO Group, Core Civic and Management and Training Corporation to operate detention centers, some of them in California where a new California law—that went into effect after the contracts were signed—bars the operation of private prisons.

Politico reported in 2018 that, according to polls, a majority of voters—aside from the activist base of the Democratic Party—did not support calls to abolish ICE. Republicans in Congress passed a resolution in support of ICE, saying "calls to abolish ICE are an insult to these heroic law enforcement officers who make sacrifices every day to secure our borders."

=== Protests over detentions ===
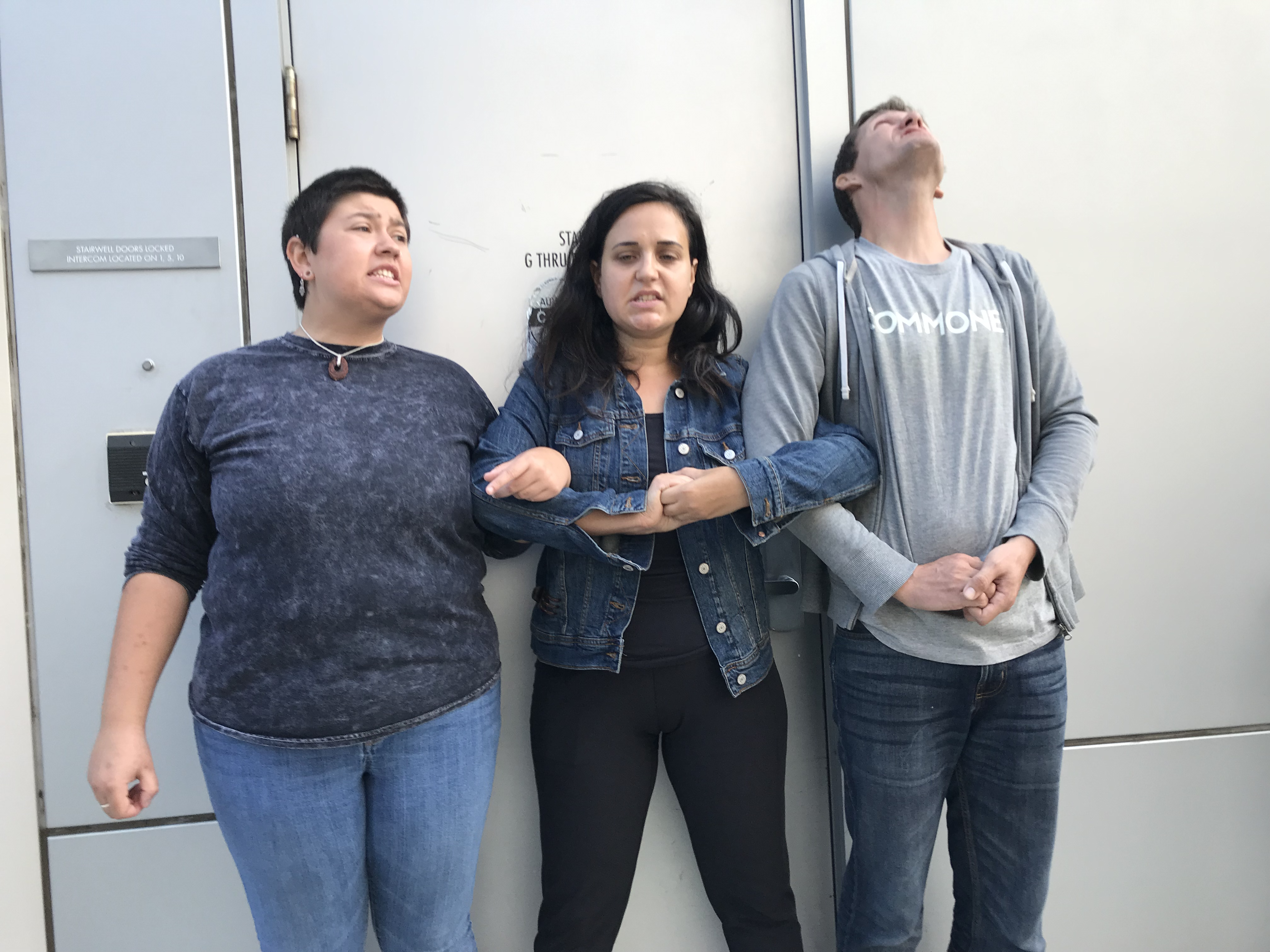
Protesters block doorway to GEO Group offices in Century City. August 5, 2019.

On August 5, 2019, the Jewish organization Never Again Action protested outside ICE contractor GEO Group's Century City headquarters, shutting down the building for five hours, resulting in several arrests. During the protest, a banner hung from a nearby parking garage read, "GEO Group runs concentration camps for ICE. #Never Again."

Activists—conducting similar protests in several U.S. cities—charged the largest private for-profit detention contractor with detaining immigrants under inhumane conditions.

GEO Group, under the "social responsibility" tab on its website, says the company "has always been committed to respecting the human rights of the persons entrusted to its care." In addition, GEO Group's website states the company acts "in compliance with all relevant governmental standards, national accreditation and certification standards."

Due to the controversies surrounding mass incarceration of immigrants in private for-profit detention centers, several banks, including Bank of America, Wells Fargo and JPMorgan Chase, announced they would no longer offer $2.4 billion lines of credit and term loans to GEO Group and CoreCivic. In November 2018, CalSTRS, the $220 billion California teachers pension fund, voted to divest from GEO Group and CoreCivic because of teacher member concerns about human rights violations in the contractors' detention centers. In November 2019, CalPERS, the $370 billion public employee pension fund, quietly divested from GEO Group and CoreCivic, as well.

== See also ==
- Federal Bureau of Prisons
- Impact of the COVID-19 pandemic on prisons
- The Marshall Project
- Prison Policy Initiative
- Social impact of the COVID-19 pandemic in the United States
