= Pirner Point =

Pirner Point (54°31′S 36°4′W) is a point marking the north side of the entrance to Little Moltke Harbor in Royal Bay, South Georgia. First surveyed by the German group of the International Polar Year Investigations, 1882–83, under Schrader, and named by them for Captain Pirner, commander of the expedition ship Moltke.
