= Solomon–Lautenberg amendment =

American federal anti-drug law

State compliance with Solomon–Lautenberg amendment States with compliant suspension policies States that have opted out

The Solomon–Lautenberg amendment is a U.S. federal law enacted in 1990 that urges states to suspend the driver's license of anyone who commits a drug offense. A number of states passed laws in the early 1990s seeking to comply with the amendment, in order to avoid a penalty of reduced federal highway funds. These laws imposed mandatory driver's license suspensions of at least six months for committing any type of drug offense, regardless of whether any motor vehicle was involved in the offense (thus the nickname "Smoke a joint, lose your license" laws, also referred to as "Possess a joint, lose your license" laws). As the amendment allows states to "opt out" without penalty, however, only three states continue to have such laws in effect as of 2021.

== Overview ==
The Solomon–Lautenberg amendment is named after its two main sponsors, U.S. Representative Jerry Solomon (R–NY) and U.S. Senator Frank Lautenberg (D–NJ). It was signed into law on November 5, 1990, as part of the 1991 Department of Transportation and Related Agencies Appropriations Act. (Note: The Solomon–Lautenberg amendment became law in 1990, was revised to fix erroneous language in 1991, and was further revised with minor changes in 1992. Some sources may refer to the law as having been passed in 1991.) The amendment urged states to enact laws requiring the "suspension for at least 6 months, of the driver's license of any individual who is convicted ... of any violation of the Controlled Substances Act or any drug offense". To urge states in this manner, the amendment required that a penalty be applied to states that did not either: (a) enact the stipulated license suspension policy; or (b) follow a procedure specified in the amendment to opt out. States that took neither of these actions faced a 5% cut in federal highway funding for fiscal years 1994 and 1995. The penalty was increased to 10% for states in non-compliance each year thereafter.

To comply with the amendment's opt-out provision, the legislature of a state is required to pass a resolution declaring its opposition to the suspension policy. The governor must then send written certification to the U.S. Secretary of Transportation stating that the resolution was approved and that the governor is opposed to the suspension policy. A state can then repeal its "Smoke a joint, lose your license" law without being penalized. In regards to the reason for requiring this, an official in the Bush administration explained: "This forces the states to be accountable. We're not going to force you, but if you don't want to do it, you'll have to be public about it."

The Solomon–Lautenberg amendment was criticized at the time by groups such as the National Governors Association and the National Organization for the Reform of Marijuana Laws, but received little attention leading up to the bill's passage. Speaking in support of his amendment, Representative Solomon stated:

Yes, we should do everything possible to interdict drugs coming into the country. Yes, we should provide adequate funds to treat addicts. And yes, we should jail – and in some cases even execute – those involved in the sale of drugs in this country. ... But let's not kid ourselves. That is not enough. ... Taking away driver's licenses in an automobile-oriented society will show that we are serious.

Senator Lautenberg stated:

The threat of losing driving privileges will give many prospective drug users a strong reason to think twice – particularly young people. ... It is an excuse for young teenagers to say no to drugs, an excuse to say, "No thanks, I'd rather preserve my driving privilege."

== State compliance ==
As of 2021, there are only three states that continue to suspend licenses per the amendment: Alabama, Arkansas, and Florida. As many as 19 states had "Smoke a joint, lose your license" laws at one time; states that have opted out after initially choosing to implement the suspension policy are California (1999), Wisconsin (2009), Oklahoma (2010), South Carolina (2011), Indiana (2014), Delaware (2014), Georgia (2015), Massachusetts (2016), Ohio (2016), Iowa (2018), Pennsylvania (2018), New York (2019), Mississippi (2019), New Jersey (2019), Virginia (2020), and Texas (2021).

By October 1994, all nineteen "Smoke a joint, lose your license" laws had been enacted. The remaining 31 states had all opted out, though some still chose to suspend licenses in some form (such as by suspending for three months instead of six).

An estimated 191,000 licenses were suspended for non-driving drug offenses in the year 2016, according to a report by the Prison Policy Initiative.

== Criticisms ==
"Smoke a joint, lose your license" laws have been criticized for a variety of reasons, including the fact that the punishment often has nothing to do with the crime. The severity of punishment is also considered to be excessive, due to the life-altering impacts that losing one's license can cause. Loss of driving privileges can lead to loss of employment, which a New Jersey study showed happened in 42% of suspension cases. In 45% of these cases, individuals were not able to find another job.

Many who lose their license also continue to drive, a number PPI estimates to be as high as a 75%. Drivers will then face even more severe punishments if caught, which further ties up police and other government resources.

Critics have also noted the severe impact on minorities and low-income communities that these suspensions can cause. In New Jersey, 16% of the state population is considered low income, while 50% of people with suspended licenses are classified as such. These individuals are then burdened by reinstatement fees that must be paid (up to $275 in Alabama), plus court fines and other fees. Car insurance rates can also rise, even for suspensions that had nothing to do with driving.

== Efforts to repeal ==
In 2017, U.S. Representative Beto O'Rourke introduced the Better Drive Act, a bill which sought to repeal the Solomon–Lautenberg amendment. To coincide with its introduction, more than 30 advocacy groups signed a letter calling for the amendment's repeal. Among the signatories of the letter was the NAACP, along with other civil rights, criminal justice reform, and addiction recovery organizations.
