= Webb Glacier (South Georgia) =

Glacier in South Georgia

- Location within South Georgia Island
- Location: South Georgia
- Coordinates: 54°32′S 36°10′W
- Length: 2 nmi (4 km; 2 mi)
- Thickness: unknown
- Terminus: Ross Glacier
- Status: unknown

Webb Glacier (54°32′S 36°10′W) is a glacier, 2 miles (3.2 km) long, flowing southeast from Mount Brooker into Ross Glacier on the north side of South Georgia. Surveyed by the South Georgia Survey, 1954–55. Named for Edgar Clive Webb, member of the SGS who, with Ian.M. Brooker, climbed Mount Brooker on January 30, 1955. This glacier forms part of the approach route to the mountain.

== See also ==
- List of glaciers in the Antarctic
- Glaciology
