= Booker =

Booker may refer to:

== Places ==
- Booker, Buckinghamshire, a hamlet in England
- Booker, Texas, a town in the United States
- RAF Booker, a Royal Air Force airfield from 1941 to 1963

== Arts and entertainment ==
- Booker (TV series), a spin-off of 21 Jump Street
- Booker (film), a 1984 American biographical short television film
- Booker Kudo (工藤 優作, Kudo Yusaku), a fictional character in Case Closed
- Booker Prize, a literary award presented annually for the best original full-length novel
- Booker, a character in the comic strip U.S. Acres
- Booker DeWitt, protagonist of the video game BioShock Infinite
- Booker Baxter-Carter, son of Raven Baxter in the television series Raven's Home

== Brands and enterprises ==
- Booker Group, the United Kingdom's largest food wholesale operator
- Booker Software, a software company headquartered in New York City
- Booker's, a bourbon produced by the Jim Beam distillery

== Roles ==
- Booker, one who plans the order of and events within professional wrestling matches
- Booking agent, or talent agent, a person who helps to arrange appearances by entertainers

== Other uses ==
- Booker (name), a list of people with the surname or given name
- M10 Booker, a armoured fighting vehicle of the United States Army
- United States v. Booker, a 2005 Supreme Court ruling permitting federal judges to depart from the United States Federal Sentencing Guidelines
- Booker (horse) Australian racehorse
