= Daphne Brooker =

- Born: Daphne Beacon; 8 June 1927; London, England
- Died: 2 February 2012 (aged 84)
- Occupations: Designer, academic

Academic background
- Education: Royal College of Art, Kingston University.

Academic work
- Institutions: Kingston University
- Main interests: Fashion design

Daphne Elizabeth Brooker (née Beacon, 8 June 1927 – 2 February 2012) was a British model, costume designer, and a professor and head of fashion at Kingston University for three decades, where she had "a leading role in the teaching of fashion".

== Early life ==
She was born Daphne Elizabeth Beacon on 8 June 1927 at the Ormond Maternity Home, 29 Blantyre Street, Chelsea, London, the elder child and only daughter of Charles Beacon, a chauffeur, and his wife, Mabel Elizabeth Beacon, née Mann (1891–1972), who were living in Battersea at the time.

She grew up and was educated in Kingston upon Thames in Surrey, her family having moved there when she was five years old. She went to Kingston School of Art from 1941 to 1945, followed by the Royal College of Art (RCA), where she received an ARCA diploma in design in 1948.

== Career ==
On leaving the RCA in 1948 she started work as an art teacher.

Brooker appeared on the front cover of Vogue in 1952, and appeared in the magazine several times, shot by photographers including Cecil Beaton, Anthony Denney and Norman Parkinson. However, she found modelling boring, and worked as a costume designer for some years.

She first taught at Walthamstow School of Art in east London, where her students included the fashion designers James Wedge, Marion Foale and Sally Tuffin, the film director Ken Russell and the musician Ian Dury.

In 1962 Brooker joined Kingston College of Art (in 1970, it merged with Kingston College of Technology in 1970 to create Kingston Polytechnic) as a lecturer, becoming head of fashion in 1963, and a professor in 1981. When she retired in 1992, the fashion department was "one of the most successful of its kind — in securing jobs for its graduates in the competitive world of design and in having paved the way for how fashion courses were subsequently taught."

Her students included the designers John Richmond, Richard Nott, and Soozie Jenkinson; Helen Storey, professor of science and fashion at the London College of Fashion; the BBC costume designer Jane Hartley; and the journalist Glenda Bailey.

== Personal life ==
On 21 July 1948, at Battersea Register Office, she married fellow RCA graduate, Maxwell Gervase Anderson Brooker (1927–2008), who was then a second lieutenant in the Royal Army Education Corps, and later became an artist and art teacher. They had one child, Caroline Sarah Brooker (born 1956), after which they bought a house in Canonbury in Islington, north London.

== Later life ==
In her later years she lived on Canonbury Road, Islington, London, and died at University College Hospital on 2 February 2012, of bronchopneumonia and chronic lymphocytic leukaemia.
