= Mount Brooker =

Mountain in South Georgia

Mount Brooker (54°30′S 36°14′W) is a mountain, 1,880 metres (6,170 ft) high, standing at the head of Webb Glacier and forming the last major summit in the southeast part of the Allardyce Range of South Georgia. The feature was identified as "Pic" (meaning Peak) or "Pikstock" by the German group of the International Polar Year Investigations, 1882–83. It was first climbed in 1955 by Ian M. Brooker, for whom it is named, and E.C. Webb, members of the British South Georgia Expedition, 1954–55, led by George Sutton.
