= Breuker =

Breuker is a surname. Notable people

- Henk Breuker (1914–2003), Dutch master turner
- Remco Breuker (born 1972), Dutch historian
- Willem Breuker (1944–2010), Dutch jazz bandleader

== See also ==
- Roger De Breuker (born 1940), Belgian professional road bicycle racer.
- Tim Breukers (born 1987), Dutch professional footballer
