= Prison Policy Initiative =

American criminal justice think tank

- Abbreviation: PPI
- Formation: 2001
- Type: Public policy think tank
- Headquarters: Northampton, Massachusetts, United States
- Executive Director: Peter Wagner
- Revenue: $692,752 (2018)
- Expenses: $459,448 (2018)
- Website: www.prisonpolicy.org

The Prison Policy Initiative (PPI) is a criminal justice oriented American public policy think tank based in Easthampton, Massachusetts. It is a non-profit organization, designated 501(c)(3) by the IRS.

It is the "leading public critic" of the United States Census Bureau's practice of counting prisoners as residents of the towns where they are incarcerated, and has conducted research in several states proving that this practice results in distortion of equal representation.

The organization produces reports that aim to show the scale of incarceration in the United States. The most well-known of these reports is the Whole Pie report, which provides a visual representation of all aspects of incarceration in the United States. It also produces "States of Incarceration", a report that compares the incarceration rate of every U.S. state to that of nearly every other country on the planet.

It also produces research and reports on specific aspects of the criminal legal system, including "States of Emergency: The Failure of Prison System Responses to COVID-19", "Rigging the jury: How each state reduces jury diversity by excluding people with criminal records", and "Eligible, but excluded: A guide to removing the barriers to jail voting". Annually, it also publishes a listing of criminal justice reforms that legislators are likely to take up in the upcoming legislative sessions.

== Census work ==
PPI published the first empirical, district-by-district analysis of the effects of Census Bureau methodology which counts prisoners as residents of towns containing prisons, not their pre-incarceration addresses, and has since been the leading critic of the practice (which it calls "prison gerrymandering") and the distortion of equal representation it causes. Executive director Peter Wagner has testified on the issue before the National Academies and the New York State Legislative Task Force on Demographic Research and Apportionment. The Census Bureau's scientific advisors at the United States National Research Council have now recommended that the Bureau begin to collect prisoners' home address information, and the New York Times editorial board has repeatedly supported PPI's calls for reform. Once an unknown issue, the problem of prisoner miscount has now been identified as "the most controversial issue for the 2010 census."

It has published reports about this issue, including, "Importing Constituents: Prisoners and Political Clout in New York", "Why the Census Bureau can and must start collecting the home addresses of incarcerated people", and "Phantom constituents in the Empire State: How outdated Census Bureau methodology burdens New York counties". It has also published the Democracy Toolkit, an internet tool designed for rural democracy activists, allowing them to use PPI's research procedures to study their own communities.

== Prison and jail telephone industry ==
PPI's multiple reports on the prison and jail phone industry explain why the industry must be regulated by the Federal Communications Commission. The reports explain that prison phone bills are so high because of a unique market failure: prison systems and local jails award monopoly contracts to the phone company that will charge the highest rates and share as much as 84% of the profits with the facility. The real customers, the families paying the hefty bills, are left entirely out of the decision-making process. In fact, both parties to these contracts profit from disregarding the interests of the actual consumers of prison telephone services. Aside from the high rates, fees also have an enormous impact on prison phone bills, making up 38% of the $1 billion annual price of calling home.

== Jail letter bans ==
The Prison Policy Initiative published the first-in-the-nation report on the new jail trend of banning letters from home and requiring loved ones to write on public postcards. The National Institute of Corrections called the report, "required reading for policy makers and anyone working with individuals in jail custody."

== Sentencing enhancement zones ==
Many states have laws that enhance sentences based on where an offense takes place. These laws aim to deter offenses near places such as schools, but when the protected areas are too big, the deterrence effect is lost and these policies end up increasing harmful racial disparities. The Prison Policy Initiative's research demonstrated that a Massachusetts drug law that set the penalty by where the offense is located—and not the harm caused by the offense—does not work, can never work, and has serious negative effects. The recommendations of the Prison Policy Initiative's two reports were endorsed by Massachusetts Governor Deval Patrick and led to a change in the law.

== See also ==
- Decarceration in the United States
- Incarceration in the United States
