= Tom Kitwood =

British psychologist and gerontologist

Thomas Marris Kitwood
- Born: 16 February 1937; Boston, England
- Died: 1 November 1998 (aged 61); Bradford, England
- Education: King's College, Cambridge; University of Bradford
- Occupations: Psychologist, gerontologist
- Known for: Person-centred dementia care Dementia Care Mapping

Thomas Marris Kitwood (16 February 1937 – 1 November 1998) was a British psychologist and gerontologist who established the person-centred approach to dementia care.

He founded the Bradford Dementia Group at the University of Bradford in 1992 and developed Dementia Care Mapping, an observational method for evaluating care quality in dementia settings. His 1997 book Dementia Reconsidered: The Person Comes First argued that the dominant biomedical model neglected the subjective experience of people with dementia, and proposed a framework centred on personhood and relationship. His work influenced dementia care policy and practice internationally, including the United Kingdom's NICE guidelines.

== Early life and education ==
Kitwood was born in Boston, Lincolnshire, the son of a local businessman. He won a rugby scholarship to King's College, Cambridge, where he read natural sciences and graduated in 1960. He then trained for the Church of England ministry and was ordained in 1962.

Kitwood took a teaching post at a church school on Lake Victoria in Uganda, where he met his wife Jenny Cooper, the daughter of missionaries. They had a son in Uganda and a daughter later in England. After Idi Amin's military coup in 1971, the family returned to Bradford. Kitwood left the clergy and enrolled at the University of Bradford, completing a doctorate in 1977 under Rom Harré with a thesis on adolescent values.

== Career ==
Kitwood joined the University of Bradford as a lecturer in 1979 and became senior lecturer in interdisciplinary human studies in 1992. He published Disclosures to a Stranger (1980), drawing on his doctoral research, and Concern for Others (1990), on the psychology of moral development.

His attention turned to dementia care in 1985, partly through his collaboration with Kathleen Bredin, who introduced him to the person-centred approach of Carl Rogers. Together they developed new models of dementia care and created Dementia Care Mapping, an observational tool for assessing care quality from the perspective of the person with dementia. In 1992 Kitwood founded the Bradford Dementia Group, which grew into a department offering undergraduate and postgraduate programmes. He was appointed Professor of Psychogerontology at Bradford shortly before his death in 1998.

== Person-centred dementia care ==
Kitwood argued that the prevailing approach to dementia care was dominated by a biomedical perspective that reduced the person to their neurological diagnosis. Under this model, behavioural changes were attributed solely to neurodegeneration, the subjective experience of the person with dementia received little attention, and care was primarily palliative. Kitwood contended that this framework left caregivers feeling powerless and offered no constructive basis for improving the quality of care.

In place of this, Kitwood proposed that personhood—which he defined as "a standing or status that is bestowed upon one human being, by others, in the context of relationship and social being"—should be the central concern of dementia care. Drawing on Martin Buber's concept of the I–Thou relationship and Rogers's core conditions of genuineness, unconditional positive regard, and empathy, Kitwood argued that attentive, respectful interaction could sustain the personhood of people with dementia even as their cognitive abilities declined.

He set out this framework in Dementia Reconsidered: The Person Comes First (1997), which was reviewed in the BMJ as a "sustained attack on what he terms the 'standard paradigm'" and a call for a model grounded in the social psychology of caregiving.

== Reception and legacy ==
Kitwood's person-centred approach has been the subject of extensive scholarly discussion. Trevor Adams published a critical review in the Journal of Advanced Nursing in 1996, identifying four key contributions while questioning elements of Kitwood's research methodology. Jan Dewing revisited his concept of personhood in 2008, examining its philosophical underpinnings and limitations. Higgs and Gilleard at University College London interrogated the concept from the perspective of moral philosophy, arguing that while Kitwood's framework was influential, its treatment of personhood required further theoretical grounding. Raineri and Cabiati extended Kitwood's ideas beyond dementia, applying them to relational social work more broadly.

A 2020 scoping review mapped 19 empirical studies applying Kitwood's framework in institutional settings, finding it remained the dominant theoretical basis for person-centred dementia care research. Dementia Care Mapping was tested in a cluster-randomised trial published in The Lancet Neurology, which found it reduced agitation in residents compared with usual care.

Kitwood's approach, alongside those of Naomi Feil and others, has influenced dementia care guidelines in several countries, including the UK's NICE guidelines and German dementia care standards. Practitioners in occupational therapy, music therapy, and related fields have adopted his model. Care providers internationally, including VivoCare, Care UK, and Helping Hands, cite Kitwood's principles in their care models.

After Kitwood's death, the Bradford Dementia Group was renamed the Centre for Applied Dementia Studies and continues to offer research and training programmes. A 384-page reader compiling his key writings with critical commentary was published by Open University Press in 2007. A revised edition of Dementia Reconsidered with updated commentary by Dawn Brooker and others appeared in 2019. In 2024, Karen Harrison Dening reflected on Kitwood's enduring relevance in an editorial for the British Journal of Community Nursing.

== Selected works ==
- What is Human? Inter-Varsity Press, 1970. ISBN 0851103510
- Disclosures to a Stranger: Adolescent Values in an Advanced Industrial Society. Taylor & Francis, 1980. ISBN 978-1000814002
- Concern for Others: A New Psychology of Conscience and Morality. Routledge, 1990. ISBN 978-0415043779
- The New Culture of Dementia Care. Hawker Publications, 1995. ISBN 978-1874790174
- Dementia Reconsidered: The Person Comes First. Open University Press, 1997. ISBN 978-0335198566
