= Greg Brooker (music producer) =

British music producer (born 1981)

- Born: March 31, 1981 (age 43); Guildford, Surrey, England
- Genres: Indie, metal, rock, electronica
- Occupation(s): Record producer, mixing engineer, mastering engineer
- Labels: Glasstone, Kitsuné, Lockjaw Records, Universal

Greg Brooker is a British music producer.

He has worked with indie, metal, rock, punk and electronica artists including: DeStijl featuring Peter Hook from Joy Division / New Order & Julie Gordon from Happy Mondays, You Love Her Coz She's Dead, Call The Doctor, Newton Faulkner, Akyra, Showing Off To Thieves, Space Fight, Sharp End First, Run From Robots, Electronic Deer, Soundisciples, Tiny Elvis, The Hurt Process.

Greg Brooker has worked on songs that have been featured on E4 tv's Skins (UK TV series) and EA Games Burnout Paradise, and has worked on releases that have charted in various countries.

== Discography ==
- Sharp End First – Songs For The Betrayed - 2006
- Showing Off To Thieves – Everyone Has Their Secrets - 2006
- The Doubtful Guest (2) – Volume Two - 2006
- You Love Her Coz She's Dead – Inner City - 2008
- Sharp End First – Rule The Day - 2008
- Young Hollywood (4) – Shotdown - 2008
- You Love Her Coz She's Dead – Young Tender Hearts Beat Fast - 2010
- Call The Doctor – Closer To Home - 2012
