= Ross Glacier =

Glacier in Antarctica

- Location within South Georgia Island
- Location: South Georgia
- Coordinates: 54°33′S 36°6′W
- Length: 6 nmi (11 km; 7 mi)
- Thickness: unknown
- Terminus: Royal Bay
- Status: unknown

Ross Glacier (54°33′S 36°6′W) is a glacier 6 miles (10 km) long, flowing east from the juncture of Allardyce and Salvesen Ranges to Little Moltke Harbour, Royal Bay, on the north coast of South Georgia. First mapped by the German group of the International Polar Year Investigations, 1882–83, and named for Sir James Clark Ross.

== See also ==
- List of glaciers in the Antarctic
- Glaciology
