= Lee Carroll Brooker case =

Case concerning a life sentence received by an Alabama man for marijuana possession

Lee Carroll Brooker is a disabled American army veteran from Cottonwood, Alabama, who was sentenced at age 75 to life in prison without parole after being convicted of marijuana possession in 2014.

== Life sentence ==
In 2011, Brooker was arrested and charged with trafficking marijuana after police visited his home in Cottonwood for unrelated reasons and noticed that he was growing marijuana behind his house. In October 2014, he was sentenced to life in prison without parole by a judge in Houston County. He was sentenced under Alabama's mandatory minimum laws, which dictate that someone caught possessing more than 2.2 pounds of a drug, and who had been convicted of certain felonies before, must be sentenced to life in prison without parole. More than 30 years prior to being convicted of marijuana possession, Brooker had been convicted of armed robbery in Florida for holding up multiple liquor stores. The 34 plants weighed a total of 2.85 pounds, although his lawyer argued that the usable amount was less than the 2.2-pound threshold. His son, Darren Lee Brooker, was found guilty of trafficking marijuana in 2013.

== Reaction and aftermath ==
On September 11, 2015, the Alabama Supreme Court denied Brooker's request for a review of his sentence. Alabama Chief Justice Roy Moore, although he concurred with the Alabama Supreme Court's decision in this case, later said that Brooker's life sentence was "excessive and unjustified". Brooker – represented by Bryan Stevenson – appealed to the Supreme Court of the United States, which rejected Brooker's appeal on April 18, 2016, a decision that let stand the Alabama Supreme Court's ruling.
