= Leonard Rapping =

American economist (1934–1991)

Leonard A. Rapping
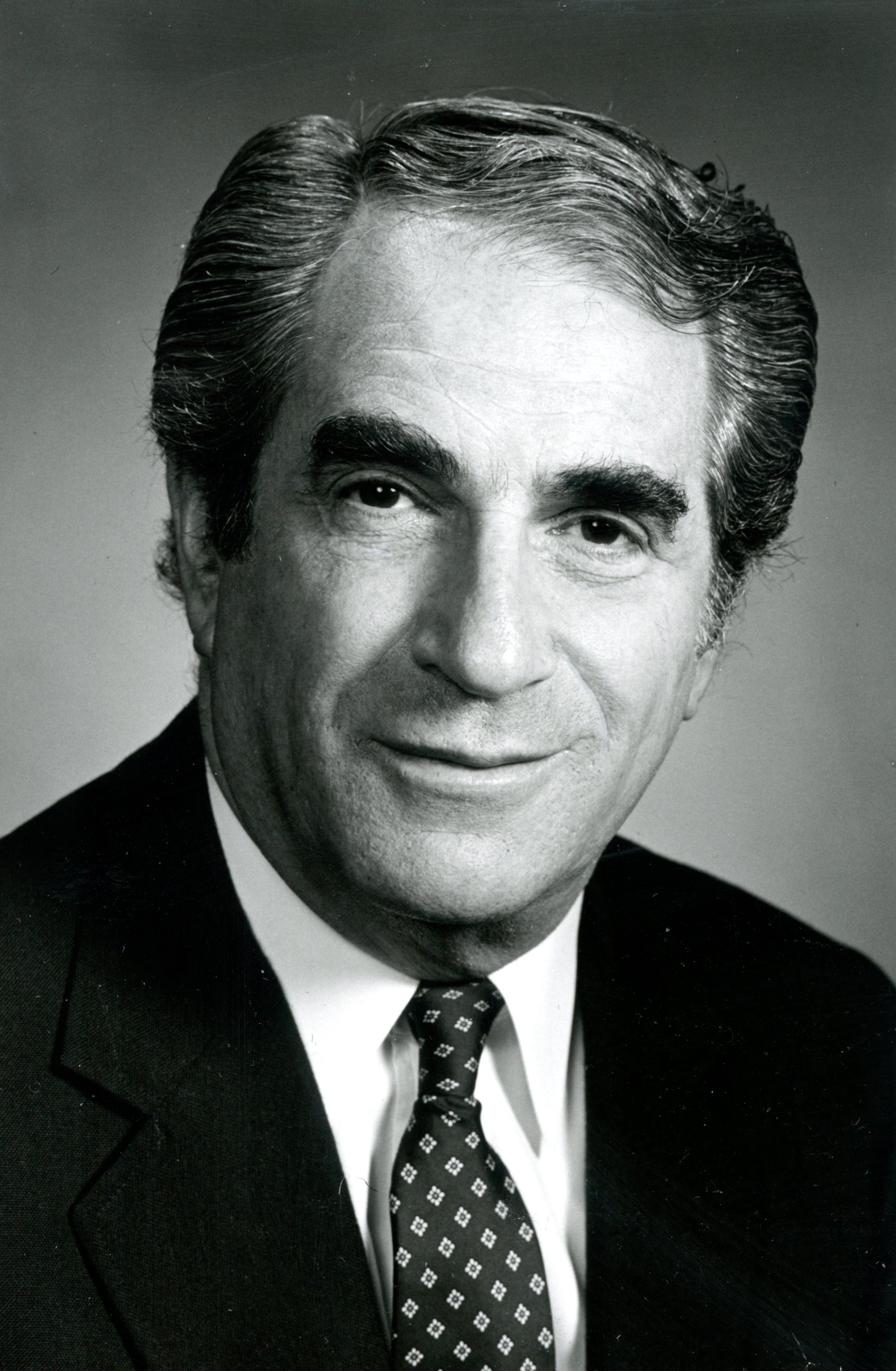
- Born: April 16, 1934
- Died: October 1, 1991 (aged 57)

Academic background
- Education: University of Chicago

Leonard Alan Rapping (April 16, 1934 – October 1, 1991) was an American economist, who advised several Federal agencies. He also helped develop theories on the interplay of human behavior and business cycles. He was most famous for his work with Robert E. Lucas which laid the foundations for real business cycle theory, which holds that the financial expectations of business executives and consumers help mold their decisions, therefore influencing economic outcomes. That theory helped analyze the 1970s phenomenon of "stagflation", in which prices rose despite economic stagnation and recession.

At the time of his death, Rapping was completing a book for the 20th Century Fund, called The Wage Crunch, on the social and economic effects of the slowdown in American wages in recent years.

== Career ==
Early in his career, Rapping held a laissez-faire view of a government's role in the economy but grew to believe capitalism needed regulation. He was highly critical of the supply-side policies of the Reagan administration, calling it a policy that "transfers money from the poor to the rich."

As a consultant and researcher, Rapping worked for the Rand Corporation, the Federal Bureau of the Budget, and the U.S. departments of Defense; Justice; Labor; and Transportation. He was with the Center for Naval Analysis, and Northwestern University's Transportation Center. Shortly before his death, Rapping served as Director of the National Academy of Science's Panel on Technology and Employment.

Rapping was Professor of Economics at the University of Massachusetts Amherst. Before that, he served on the faculty of Graduate School of Industrial Administration, Carnegie-Mellon University. He also taught at Brandeis University, University of Notre Dame, the University of Nevada, San Fernando State College, and UCLA.

Rapping obtained his bachelor's degree from UCLA, 1956, Phi Beta Kappa, Master of Arts, University of Chicago, 1958 and Doctor of Philosophy in Economics, University of Chicago, 1961.

== Family ==
The son of Joseph and Rose (née Scharfin), Rapping was born in Indianapolis. He had a sister, Hanna Lee Rapping Jutovsky, and a brother, Richard. From his marriage to Elayne Antler Rapping in 1960 (divorced 1973), Rapping had two children: his daughter, Alison Rapping, a leader and organizer in the social justice nonprofit sector; his son, Jonathan Rapping, a criminal defense attorney, and founder of Gideon's Promise. He married Judith Alt Wilson in 1980, becoming stepfather to her daughter and son.

== Selected publications ==
- Lucas, Robert E; Rapping, Leonard A (1972). "Unemployment in the Great Depression: Is There a Full Explanation?". Journal of Political Economy. 80 (1): 186–191. doi:10.1086/259872. JSTOR 1830142. S2CID 153360797.
- Robert E. Lucas, Jr.; Leonard A. Rapping (Sep–Oct 1969). "Real Wages, Employment, and Inflation". Journal of Political Economy. 77 (5): 721–754. doi:10.1086/259559. JSTOR 1829964. S2CID 154683563.
- McGuire, Timothy W; Rapping, Leonard A (1968). "The Role of Market Variables and Key Bargains in the Manufacturing Wage Determination Process". Journal of Political Economy. 76 (5): 1015–1036. doi:10.1086/259465. JSTOR 1830034. S2CID 154419354.
- Rapping, L. (1965). "Learning and World War II Production Functions". The Review of Economics and Statistics. 47 (1): 81–86. doi:10.2307/1924126. JSTOR 1924126.
- Pascal, Anthony H; Rapping, Leonard A. (1972). Racial Discrimination in Economic Life. The Rand Corporation, Lexington Books. ISBN 978-0-669-83352-2.
- Meyer, John (1963). "The Economic Value of the United States Merchant Marine. Allen R. Ferguson, Eugene M. Lerner, John S. Mc Gee, Walter Y. Oi, Leonard A. Rapping, Stephen P. Sobotka". Journal of Political Economy. 71 (6): 601–602. doi:10.1086/258828.
- Rapping, Leonard A. (1991). International Reorganization and American Economic Policy. Simon & Schuster. ISBN 978-0-8147-7416-8.
