= Allen Johnson (activist) =

American civil rights leader

- Occupations: Clergyman, activist
- Organization(s): Southern Christian Leadership Conference (SCLC); National Association for the Advancement of Colored People
- Political party: Democratic
- Movement: Civil Rights Movement; Peace movement

Allen Johnson was a leader in the Civil Rights Movement, an activist in the National Association for the Advancement of Colored People, and he was also a minister of religion. Johnson is the grandfather of Georgetown law professor Vida Johnson.

== Early life and family ==
Johnson was the son of the Reverend L. E. Johnson, the head pastor at Pratt Memorial United Methodist Church in Jackson, Mississippi. After heading the church for four years, L. E. Johnson became district superintendent of the Jackson District. Johnson was an officer in the United States Army.

== Minister ==
In 1963, Johnson, like his father once had, became the head pastor at Pratt Memorial United Methodist Church in Jackson, Mississippi. Johnson helped the church with fundraising and organization. Johnson organized an inspirational choir, a youth choir and a children's choir. With the fruits of Johnson's fundraising efforts, funds were used to pay off the church and parsonage indebtedness.

== Civil rights movement leader ==
=== Evers march ===
In 1963, after Medgar Evers was assassinated by white supremacists for his civil rights leadership, an estimated five thousand people marched from the Masonic Temple on Lynch Street to the Collins Funeral Home on North Farish Street in Jackson. Johnson, Dr. Martin Luther King Jr. and other civil rights leaders led the procession.

=== Southern Christian Leadership Conference ===
In 1966, Johnson hosted the Tenth Annual Southern Christian Leadership Conference at the Masonic Temple in Jackson. The theme of the conference was human rights - the continuing struggle. Those in attendance, among others, included: Dr. King, Edward Kennedy, James Bevel, Ralph Abernathy, Curtis W. Harris, Walter E. Fauntroy, C. T. Vivian, Andrew Young, The Freedom Singers, Charles Evers, Fred Shuttlesworth, Cleveland Robinson, Randolph Blackwell, Annie Bell Robinson Devine, Charles Kenzie Steele, Alfred Daniel Williams King, Benjamin Hooks, Aaron Henry and Bayard Rustin.

=== March Against Fear ===
Also, in 1966, Johnson participated in the March Against Fear, which is also known as the "Meredith March." At the closing rally near the Mississippi State Capitol in Jackson, Johnson preached alongside Dr. King. Dr. King spoke of his dream "that one day the empty stomachs of Mississippi will be filled, that the idle industries of Appalachia will be revitalized."

=== Klan bombing ===
In the fall of 1967, the Ku Klux Klan placed a bomb under the floor of a parsonage where Johnson and his family slept. The parsonage was connected to St. Paul's United Methodist Church in Laurel, Mississippi. However, no one was injured when the bomb exploded. Allen Johnson and his family were targeted because he was an activist in the National Association for the Advancement of Colored People and the larger civil rights movement. The bombing was part of several months of violence by the Ku Klux Klan in Mississippi. The morning after the bombing, Johnson's wife sent her children to school so that everyone in town knew that the Johnson family was not intimidated by the bombing.

=== NAACP ===
Johnson was active in the NAACP. At one time, Johnson was the Mississippi NAACP assistant field secretary. Through his participation in the NAACP, Johnson participated in the Mississippi Voter Registration and Education League (MVREL). In the spring of 1967, Johnson coordinated eight MVREL seminars to train people in voter registration.

=== Business leader ===
Johnson led a businessman's parade in Jackson and was beaten during that peaceful demonstration. Johnson recalled: "It was during this demonstration that this white man who struck me said, 'You cannot walk on our street.' We have heard them say, 'My state.' We want to say, 'Our state.' We have fought for it, we have bled for it, we are concerned, our children are in it, and we want to help it."

=== Political involvement ===
Johnson was interested in politics and considered running for public office. Around 1967, Johnson and Charles Evers decided to start a very quiet whispering campaign that encouraged blacks to vote for William Winter in the Mississippi's governor's race. The leaders whispered because any public expression of black support would have damaged a white candidate in the eyes of many white voters.

In 1968, with the support of the Mississippi AFL-CIO, Johnson coordinated workshops that taught African-Americans how to participate in local Democratic party meetings. Johnson and other activists aimed to send a delegation to the 1968 Democratic National Convention.

== Death and legacy ==
In 2013, United States Congressional Representative Bennie Thompson honored Pratt Memorial United Methodist Church and Johnson. Johnson's activism inspired his granddaughter, Vida Johnson, to go to law school.
