= Gary Kohlman =

American lawyer

W. Gary Kohlman
- Education: University of Michigan (B.A.); University of Michigan Law School (J.D.)
- Scientific career
- Fields: Criminal law, Criminal procedure, Labor law
- Workplaces: National Basketball Players Association
- Academic advisors: Yale Kamisar

Warren Gary Kohlman is the general counsel to the National Basketball Players Association and an American criminal defense attorney. Kohlman has represented several high-profile defendants and worked as a public defender for the Public Defender Service for the District of Columbia.

== Education ==
Kohlman earned a Bachelor of Arts from the University of Michigan in 1968 and then graduated from the University of Michigan Law School in 1971, where he was mentored by Professor Yale Kamisar. Kohlman was elected to the Order of the Coif, graduating in the top ten percent of his graduating class.

After law school, he worked as a judicial law clerk to the Honorable Samuel Roberts of the Pennsylvania Supreme Court.

== Legal career ==
=== Public defender ===
After clerking, Kohlman joined the Public Defender Service for the District of Columbia. He worked for PDS from 1973 to 1982, serving as the Training Director and as the Felony Trial Chief. While serving as training director, Kohlman trained Harvard Law Professor Charles Ogletree. DC Superior Court Judge Eugene N. Hamilton called Kohlman an outstanding trial attorney.

While with PDS, Kohlman argued before the United States Supreme Court.

=== Private practice ===
Kohlman worked in a private law practice with Mark J. Rochon Jr. and Michele A. Roberts. In 1995, Kohlman joined Bredhoff & Kaiser, a Washington DC law firm, where he worked until 2014.

In the 1980s, Kohlman defended FBI Agent H. Edward Tickel in a variety of criminal cases including robbing the FBI credit union. In 1985 to 1986, Kohlman represented Larry Wu-tai Chin, a Chinese-language translator for the Central Intelligence Agency, convicted of selling classified documents to the People's Republic of China. He represented John Jenrette in the wake of the ABSCAM investigation.

In the 1990s, Kohlman represented Conley D. Wolfswinkel as a part of the Keating Five scandal. He represented Terry Nichols in a Washington, DC matter. Kohlman represented two witnesses before Kenneth Starr's grand jury regarding the Lewinsky scandal.

In the 2000s, Kohlman defended Scott Ritter on charges of soliciting minors for sex online. In 2014, Kohlman—representing Northwestern University football students—cross-examined head coach Pat Fitzgerald in a case before the National Labor Relations Board. Lester Munston described his cross-examination as quiet and artful, eliciting exactly the type of proof that the players needed from Fitzgerald. The regional director of the NLRB who heard the case found that Northwestern scholarship football players were university employees and thus entitled to unionize. That decision is being appealed by Northwestern.

=== NBPA ===
In 2014, the National Basketball Players Association hired Kohlman as its new general counsel. Kohlman worked with Michele A. Roberts—who the current executive director of the NBPA—in the Public Defender Service for the District of Columbia and then worked together as partners in a private firm. In 2015, Kohlman alleged that the NBA age limit has racial undertones. He provided support to Thabo Sefolosha after he was arrested by the New York Police Department.

=== Law professor ===
Kohlman is an adjunct professor at Georgetown University Law Center where he teaches a course on federal white collar crime and is on the faculty of the Harvard Law School Trial Advocacy Workshop.

== Personal life ==
Kohlman is married to Washington, D.C.–based attorney, Lesley Zork. He has four children.

== Other organizations ==
Kohlman serves on the board of Gideon's Promise. He also serves on the board of JusticeAid. Kohlman has served on the board of trustees for the Public Defender Service for the District of Columbia.
