= Vida Johnson =

American criminal defense attorney

- Education: University of California, Berkeley (BA); New York University School of Law (JD)
- Occupations: Associate Professor of Law at Georgetown University Law Center; Criminal Defense Attorney
- Website: Georgetown Law Biography

Vida B. Johnson is an American criminal defense attorney and professor of law at Georgetown University Law Center. Johnson directs the Criminal Justice Clinic, and supervises attorneys in the E. Barrett Prettyman Post-Graduate Fellowship Program. Johnson regularly writes in the area of criminal law and procedure.

== Family and education ==
Johnson's grandfather, Dr. Reverend Allen Johnson, was a leader in the Civil Rights Movement in Mississippi. In 1967, the Johnson family home in Laurel, Mississippi was bombed by members of the Ku Klux Klan. Reverend Johnson and his family were targeted because he was an activist in the National Association for the Advancement of Colored People.

Vida Johnson was raised in San Diego, California. Johnson went to college at the University of California at Berkeley. Johnson earned her degree in American history. Johnson went on to law school at New York University School of Law. Johnson went to law school wanting to be a civil rights lawyer, following in the footsteps of her grandfather. After her first year of law school, Johnson worked at the Louisiana Crisis Assistance Center where she worked on class-action lawsuits on behalf of death row inmates at the Mississippi State Penitentiary. After her second summer, she interned at the San Francisco public defender's office. During her final year of law school, she worked in the Juvenile Defense Clinic at NYU Law. After law school, Johnson was an E. Barrett Prettyman fellow at Georgetown Law. As a fellow, she represented indigent adults in the D.C. Superior Court and supervised students in the Criminal Justice Clinic.

== Legal career ==
=== Public defender service ===
After her fellowship at Georgetown Law, Johnson began work as a public defender with the trial division of the Public Defender Service for the District of Columbia (PDS), where she worked for eight years. At PDS, Johnson handled serious felony cases. She tried numerous felony cases in D.C. Superior Court representing indigent clients facing charges including homicide, sexual assault, and armed offenses. Johnson eventually became a supervisor of the trial division and served as one of the PDS's two representatives to the D.C. Superior Court Sentencing Guidelines Commission.

=== Georgetown Law ===
In 2009, Johnson began working and teaching in the Juvenile Justice Clinic at Georgetown University Law Center. Johnson now works in the Criminal Justice Clinic (CJC) and Criminal Defense & Prisoner Advocacy Clinic (CDPAC). In her CDPAC and CJC role, she directs Juris Doctor students representing defendants facing misdemeanor charges in D.C. Superior Court.

Johnson is also a supervisor for the E. Barrett Prettyman Fellowship and Stuart Stiller Post-Graduate Fellowship Program. The E. Barrett Prettyman and Stuart Stiller Fellowship Program combines instruction in the Law Center's graduate school with representation of indigent clients in the local courts of the District of Columbia. It trains recent law graduates in both the academic and practical aspects of courtroom advocacy. The program aims to improve defense advocacy in the criminal justice system by providing able, devoted counsel under mature supervision for indigent defendants. The fellowships are awarded to three recent law graduates selected to participate in a two-year program leading to the LL.M. degree. In the program, Johnson supervises fellows handling felonies and misdemeanors.

== Writing and views ==
Johnson writes and teaches in the area of criminal law. In A Plea for Funds: Using Padilla, Lafler, and Frye to Increase Public Defender Resources, writes about Supreme Court case law around ineffective assistance of counsel and on how this line of cases impacts public defender offices.

Johnson does indigent criminal defense work because she believes there to be criminalization of the black community that replaced the Jim Crow segregation of her grandfather's time. Johnson appeared on C-SPAN to discuss criminal defense work.

Johnson supports the Black Lives Matter movement.

Johnson signed "Second chances: More harm than good?," a letter to the editor of The Washington Post, along with Professor Abbe Smith and Professor Kristin Henning. The letter criticized the "Second-Chance City" series and its negative portrayal of the Youth Rehabilitation Act.

Johnson, along with six other law professors, organized an open letter urging the U.S. Senate Committee on the Judiciary to reject the nomination of Senator Jeff Sessions (R-Ala.) for the position of U.S. Attorney General. More than 1,400 law school faculty members from 180 institutions signed the letter, including 1,226 law school professors from 179 campuses in 48 states. Johnson appeared on MSNBC to discuss the letter.

== Contributions to law reviews and scholarly journals ==
- Arresting Batson: How Striking Jurors Based on Arrest Records Violates Batson, 34 Yale L. & Pol'y Rev. 387 (2016).
- Presumed Fair? Voir Dire on the Fundamentals of Our Criminal Justice System, 45 Seton Hall L. Rev. 545 (2015).
- A Plea for Funds: Using Padilla, Lafler, and Frye to Increase Public Defender Resources, 51 American Criminal Law Review 403 (2014).
- When the Government Holds the Purse Strings but Not the Purse: Brady, Giglio, and Crime Victim Compensation Funds, 38 N.Y.U. Rev. L. & Soc. Change 491 (2014).
- Effective Assistance of Counsel and Guilty Pleas—Seven Rules to Follow, 37 The Champion 24 (2013).
- A Word of Caution: Consequences of Confession, 10 Ohio St. J. Crim. L. 213 (2012).
- A Primer on Crossing an Informant, 35 The Champion 40 (2011).
