= Ludlow Porch =

American humorist (1934–2011)

- Born: Bobby Crawford Hanson; October 11, 1934
- Died: February 11, 2011 (aged 76)

Ludlow Porch (October 11, 1934 – February 11, 2011), born Bobby Crawford Hanson, was an American radio humorist popular in the Southern United States. He was the author of many humor books, including Fat White Guys Cookbook and Who Cares about Apathy. His stepbrother was Lewis Grizzard.

== Biography ==
In 1971, Sports Illustrated was looking for five trivia experts to profile. Lewis Grizzard, Ludlow's stepbrother, had been a stringer for the magazine and told its editors about Ludlow. The magazine dispatched a writer to visit Ludlow. The writer came away convinced that Ludlow’s head was full of worthless information, and wrote about it.

The 1972 article got the attention of WSB radio in Atlanta, which asked the local celebrity to come on the air. Station officials at WRNG “Ring Radio” were listening, and invited Ludlow to visit for a week. Ludlow stated, “I came for a week and never left.”

Ludlow worked at WRNG for a decade, before jumping to WSB when Ring Radio switched to an all-news format. Ludlow was a regular at WSB for more than a decade.

Ludlow was a radio talk-show host for over 30 years, first on WRNG, now WCNN, later on WSB radio, and then on several stations in eight states in the Southeast. Ludlow often walked you down memory lane with a down-home sense of humor and a friendly style. He always ended his show with his famous saying, "Whatever else you do today, you find somebody to be nice to!" To show his appreciation to his regular "Wacko" listeners, Ludlow hosted an annual party for listeners to meet, greet, and eat.

Bill Sanders, president of the Georgia Association of Broadcasters for more than a quarter of a century, said of Ludlow Porch, "He's a true American humorist in the style of Will Rogers. Ludlow's view of the world is a little skewed from center and that difference from the ordinary guarantees peals of laughter. Ludlow lives to make people laugh...mostly at themselves."

Ludlow was inducted into the Georgia Radio Hall of Fame in 2007.

Ludlow owned Blue Ribbon Grill in Tucker, Ga. and had a degree from Atlanta's John Marshall Law School.

Ludlow died on February 11, 2011, after an extended illness.

== Books ==
- Porch, Ludlow (1981). A View from the Porch. Atlanta, Ga.: Peachtree Publishers. p. 184. ISBN 978-0-931948-17-6. OCLC 7730799.
- Porch, Ludlow (1983). The Cornbread Chronicles. Atlanta, Ga.: Peachtree Publishers. p. 189. ISBN 978-0-931948-48-0. OCLC 10280785.
- Porch, Ludlow (1984). There's Nothing Neat About Seeing Your Feet : The Life & Times of a Fat American. Atlanta, Ga.: Peachtree Publishers. p. 157. ISBN 978-0-931948-65-7. OCLC 11348261.
- Porch, Ludlow (1986). Weirdos, Winos & Defrocked Priests. Atlanta, Ga.: Peachtree Publishers. p. 180. ISBN 978-0-934601-05-4. OCLC 1036919194.
- Porch, Ludlow (1987). Who Cares About Apathy?. Atlanta, Ga.: Peachtree Publishers. pp. 115. ISBN 978-0-934601-30-6. OCLC 17311862.
- Porch, Ludlow (1988). Jonas Wilkerson was a Gravy-Suckin' Pig. Atlanta, Ga.: Longstreet Press. pp. 176. ISBN 0-929264-04-5. OCLC 19115542.
- Porch, Ludlow (1989). Honest, Officer, the Midget was on Fire When I Got Here. Atlanta, Ga.: Longstreet Press. p. 174. ISBN 0-929264-62-2. OCLC 20916751.
- Porch, Ludlow; Porch, Diane Cox (1990). The Fat White Guy's Cookbook. Atlanta, Ga.: Longstreet Press. p. 164. ISBN 978-0-929264-76-9. OCLC 22756322.
- Porch, Ludlow (1994). We're All in This Alone. Atlanta, Ga.: Longstreet Press. p. 144. ISBN 978-1-56352-171-3. OCLC 31801680.
- Porch, Ludlow (1997). You're Sittin' on Boomey! : The Best of Ludlow Porch. Atlanta, Ga.: Longstreet Press. p. 180. ISBN 978-1-56352-436-3. OCLC 39157201.
