= Melanie D. Wilson =

American academic administrator and law professor

Academic background
- Education: University of Georgia (BA, JD)

Academic work
- Discipline: Criminal procedure; Fourth and Sixth Amendments; prosecutorial ethics; juries
- Institutions: Atlanta's John Marshall Law School; University of Kansas; University of Tennessee; Washington and Lee University

Melanie D. Wilson is an American academic administrator and law professor serving as the dean and Roy L. Steinheimer Jr. Professor of Law of the Washington and Lee University School of Law since 2022. She is an expert on criminal procedure, the Fourth and Sixth Amendments, juries, and prosecutorial ethics. Wilson was dean and Lindsay Young Distinguished Professor of the University of Tennessee College of Law from 2015 to 2020 and its dean emerita from 2020 to 2022.

== Life ==
Wilson earned a B.A. in journalism with a minor in business, magna cum laude, in June 1987 from University of Georgia. She golfed during her undergraduate studies, was a member of its 1986 Southeastern Conference championship team, and an Academic All-American. She earned a J.D., magna cum laude in May 1990 from the University of Georgia School of Law. She was inducted into the Order of the Coif.

From January 1992 to August 1993, she was a federal judicial law clerk to Richard Cameron Freeman of the United States District Court for the Northern District of Georgia. She was an associate attorney for Eversheds Sutherland from September 1993 to February 1995. From March 1995 to April 1999, she was a Georgia assistant attorney general. She served as an assistant United States Attorney for the Middle District of Georgia from September 1999 to October 2001 and the Northern District of Georgia from October 2001 to May 31, 2005.

Wilson's scholarship focuses on criminal procedure, the Fourth and Sixth Amendments, juries, and prosecutorial ethics. She joined Atlanta's John Marshall Law School as an associate professor from June 2005 to July 2007. She joined the University of Kansas School of Law in June 2007 as an associate professor and was promoted to professor in May 2011. She served as its associate dean for academic affairs from June to August 2011 and December 2011 to June 2015. She was also its inaugural director of diversity and inclusion from January 1, 2014, to June 2015.

Wilson joined the University of Tennessee College of Law in July 2015 as its dean and Lindsay Young Distinguished Professor. She succeeded Doug Blaze. She was a dean emerita from July 1, 2020, to June 30, 2022. On July 1, 2022, she became the dean and Roy L. Steinheimer Jr., professor of law at the Washington and Lee University School of Law. She succeeded interim dean Michelle Drumbl.

She is the co-author of three books on criminal procedure and has published more than a dozen articles and essays addressing prosecutorial ethics and the Fourth and Sixth Amendments. She is a member of the American Law Institute. In 2024, she was chosen as the president of the Association of American Law Schools, succeeding Mark C. Alexander.

In 2026, Wilson’s leadership as a Dean was called into question following an article published by The Washington Post. The article highlighted her administration’s admission of Tate Weston, a student who pled guilty to sexual battery for an assault that occurred while he was enrolled at Tulane University in Louisiana. Weston’s victim contacted Wilson and other members of her administration in November 2024 disclosing the details of the assault and warning the administration that Weston posed a threat. Wilson and her administration allowed Weston to remain a student. Weston remained a student until November 2026.
