= Kristin Henning =

American lawyer

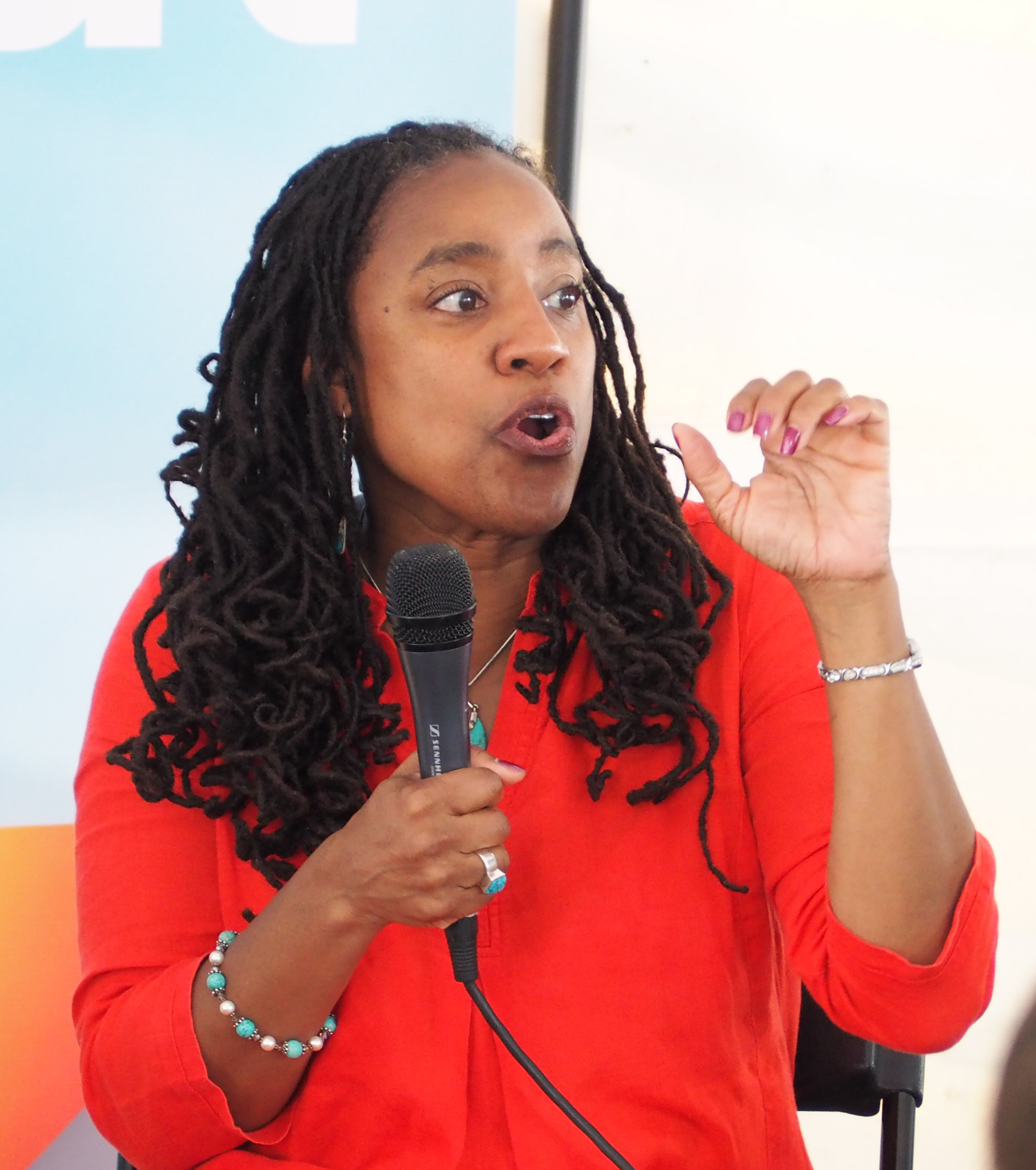
- Born: Kristin Nicole Henning
- Citizenship: American
- Occupations: Professor of Law; Author
- Board member of: Center for Children's Law and Policy; Mid-Atlantic Juvenile Defender Center (Director); American Law Institute's Restatement on Children and the Law (Adviser)
- Awards: Robert E. Shepherd, Jr. Award for Excellence in Juvenile Defense (2013); Shanara Gilbert Award; Juvenile Law Center's Leadership Prize (2021)

Academic background
- Education: Duke University (BA); Yale University (JD); Georgetown University (LLM)

Academic work
- Discipline: Legal scholarship
- Institutions: Georgetown University Law Center
- Main interests: criminal law, juvenile justice, family law, criminal procedure
- Website: https://www.rageofinnocence.com/

Kristin Henning is a professor of law at the Georgetown University Law Center, where she is the Blume Professor of Law and the director of the university's Juvenile Justice Clinic. She is best known for her work in juvenile defense and for her book, The Rage of Innocence: How America Criminalizes Black Youth. Henning also works with the National Juvenile Defender Center.

== Early life and education ==
Henning was born and raised in North Carolina. In 1992, Henning graduated from Duke University and received a Bachelor of Arts in English and African-American Studies. She then attended Yale Law School, where she received a Juris Doctor in 1995. In 2002, Henning earned a Master of Laws from Georgetown University Law Center.

== Career ==
In 1995, Henning was a Stuart-Stiller Fellow in the Criminal and Juvenile Justice Clinic at the Georgetown University Law Center. After her fellowship, Henning began working at the Public Defender Service for the District of Columbia. While working for the Public Defender Service, Henning helped organize a Juvenile Unit that was designed to meet the multi-disciplinary needs of children in the juvenile legal system and served as the lead attorney for the Juvenile Unit from 1998 until 2001.

In 2001, Henning began working at the Georgetown University Law Center. In 2013, the National Juvenile Defender Center awarded Henning the Robert E. Shepherd Jr. Award for Excellence in Juvenile Defense. At the Law Center, Henning is the Blume Professor of Law and the director of the university's Juvenile Justice Clinic. Henning served as the Law Center's Associate Dean for Clinics and Experiential Learning from 2017 to 2020. In 2020, amid the Black Lives Matter movement, Henning started Ambassadors for Racial Justice, a year-long program for defenders committed to challenging racial inequities in the juvenile legal system. In 2021, Henning was awarded the Leadership Prize from the Juvenile Law Center.

On September 28, 2021, Henning released her book The Rage of Innocence: How America Criminalizes Black Youth.

== Publications ==
=== Books ===
- The Rage of Innocence: How America Criminalizes Black Youth (Pantheon Books, September 28, 2021)
