= The Gault Center =

American nonprofit organization

- Abbreviation: NJDC
- Founder: Patricia Puritz
- Type: Nonprofit
- Purpose: Juvenile justice; Justice reform; Prison reform; Ending youth incarceration; School-to-prison pipeline
- Headquarters: 1350 Connecticut Avenue NW, Suite 304
- Location: Washington, D.C., United States
- Board of directors: Philip Inglima; Hank Stewart; Kenneth Schmetterer; Mariela Romero; Dr. Antoinette Kavanaugh; Randy Hertz; Anastacia Johnson; Patti Lee; Michael Pinard; Jim St. Germain
- Website: www.defendyouthrights.org
- Formerly called: National Juvenile Defender Center

The Gault Center, formerly the National Juvenile Defender Center or NJDC, is a nonprofit organization located in the United States that advocates for juvenile justice reform. NJDC changed names to The Gault Center in 2022.

== History ==
The American Bar Association Juvenile Justice Center eventually grew into the National Juvenile Defender Center. In 2005, Patricia Puritz founded NJDC as a standalone organization. In May 2015, Kim Dvorchak succeeded Puritz as the executive director of NJDC.

NJDC has advocated against the shackling of juveniles during court appearances and provides training for attorneys working with juveniles.

Throughout the COVID-19 pandemic, the NJDC argued for the release of detained juveniles for safety reasons.

== See also ==
- American juvenile justice system
- Juvenile court
- Juvenile delinquency in the United States
- Kids for cash scandal
- Prison–industrial complex
- School-to-prison pipeline
- Trial as an adult in the United States
- Youth incarceration in the United States
