= Atlanta's John Marshall Law School =

Private not-for-profit law school in Atlanta, Georgia, USA

Coordinates: 33°45′40.19″N 84°23′8.42″W

- Established: 1933
- School type: Private law school
- Dean: Martin L. Ellin
- Location: Atlanta, Georgia, U.S.
- USNWR ranking: 175-194 (lowest rank) (2026)
- Bar pass rate: 72.2% (July 2026 first-time takers of the Georgia bar exam)
- Website: johnmarshall.edu
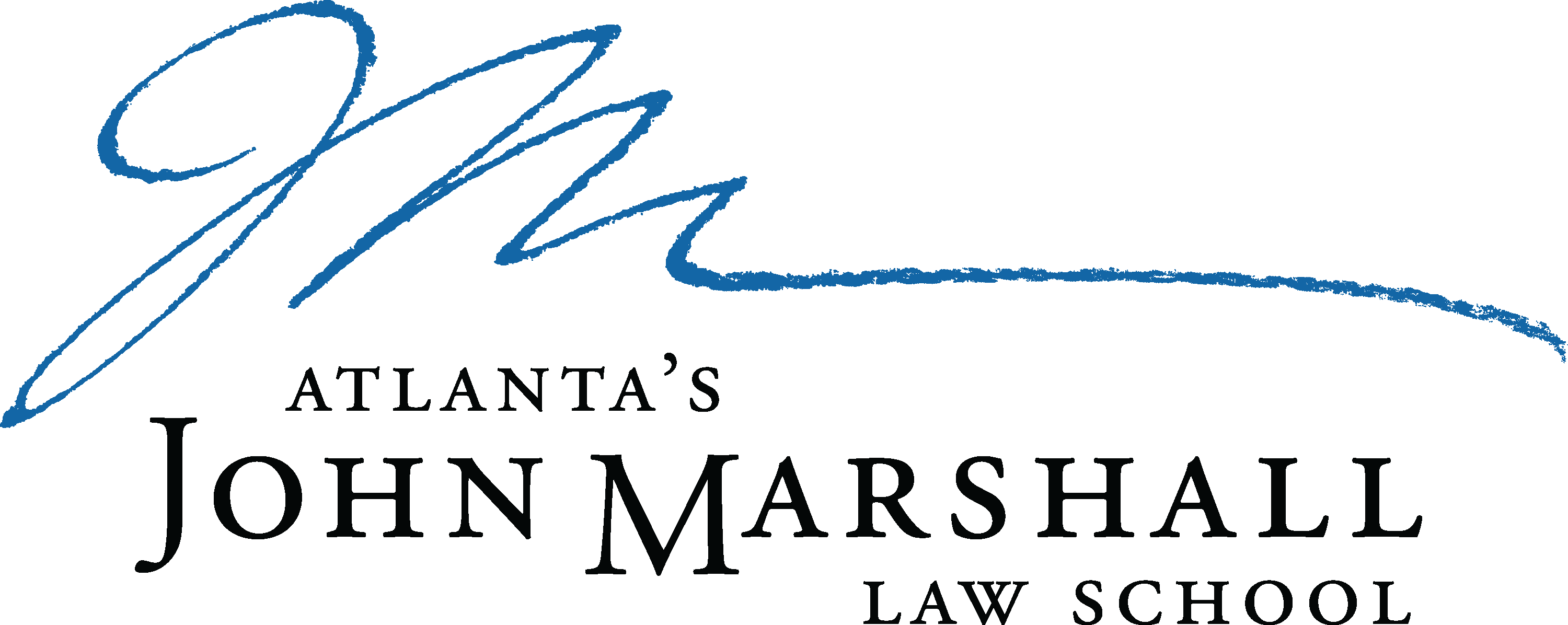

Atlanta's John Marshall Law School (AJMLS) is a private law school in Atlanta, Georgia, United States. It was founded in 1933 and named for John Marshall, the fourth chief justice of the Supreme Court of the United States. AJMLS is accredited by the American Bar Association.

== History ==
AJMLS was founded in 1933 in Atlanta and was among the first southern law schools to integrate. It received American Bar Association (ABA) approval in 2005. In October 2017, the ABA concluded that the Law School was not in compliance with ABA Standards 301(a), 309(b), and 501(a)/501(b), and in December 2018, the ABA placed the school on probation for "substantial" and "persistent" non-compliance with those standards. At its November 2019 meeting, the Council removed the Law School from probation. On May 15, 2020, the council of the American Bar Association’s Section of Legal Education and Admissions to the Bar determined AJMLS and nine other ABA law schools had significant noncompliance with Standard 316. This Standard was revised in 2019 to provide that at least 75% of an accredited law school's graduates who took a bar exam must pass one within two years of graduation. On February 26, 2021, the ABA's council posted that the school was now in compliance with the standard.

In late 2011, AJMLS opened a branch campus in Savannah, Georgia, named Savannah Law School. In March 2018, the Law School announced its branch campus in Savannah was no longer accepting applications for 2018 and offered its current students options to continue their legal education in Savannah, initiate an intra-campus transfer to the main campus in Atlanta, or seek to transfer or visit at a different institution.

In 2025, Atlanta's John Marshall Law School established the Criminal and Civil Justice Institute (CCJI) in partnership with Gideon's Promise and The Barristers Society. The institute was created to provide practical training, mentorship, and professional development opportunities for law students and early-career attorneys, with a focus on improving access to justice for underserved communities. The CCJI connects students and alumni with experienced attorneys through externships, internships, and mentorship programs designed to supplement classroom instruction with hands-on legal experience in criminal and civil practice. The institute also hosts workshops, seminars, and continuing legal education programs for students and practicing attorneys, particularly those in solo or small-firm settings. Through its partnerships, the Criminal and Civil Justice Institute seeks to support professional development, strengthen legal advocacy skills, and contribute to improved quality of legal representation in the Atlanta area and beyond.

== Campus ==
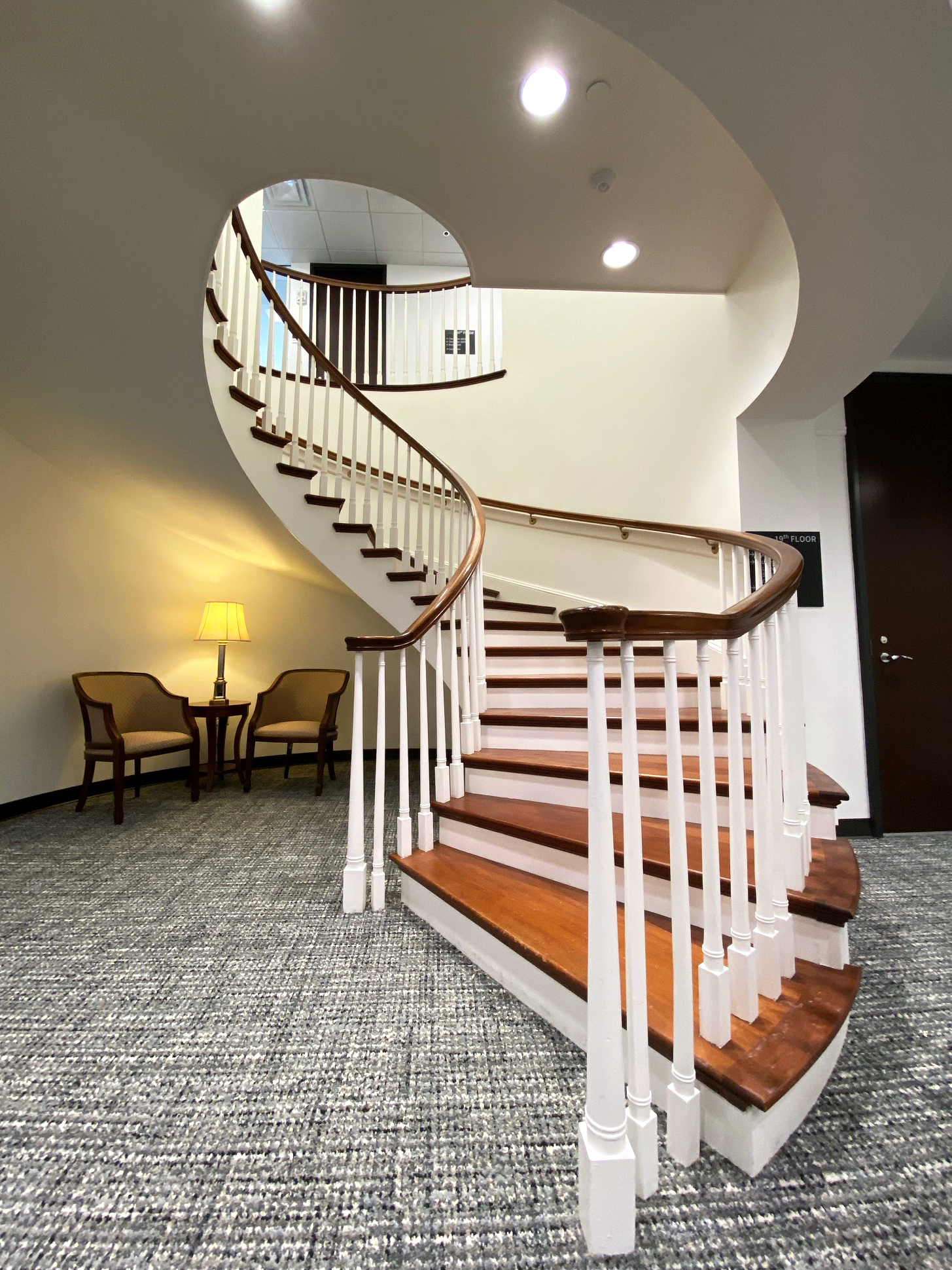
Internal staircase

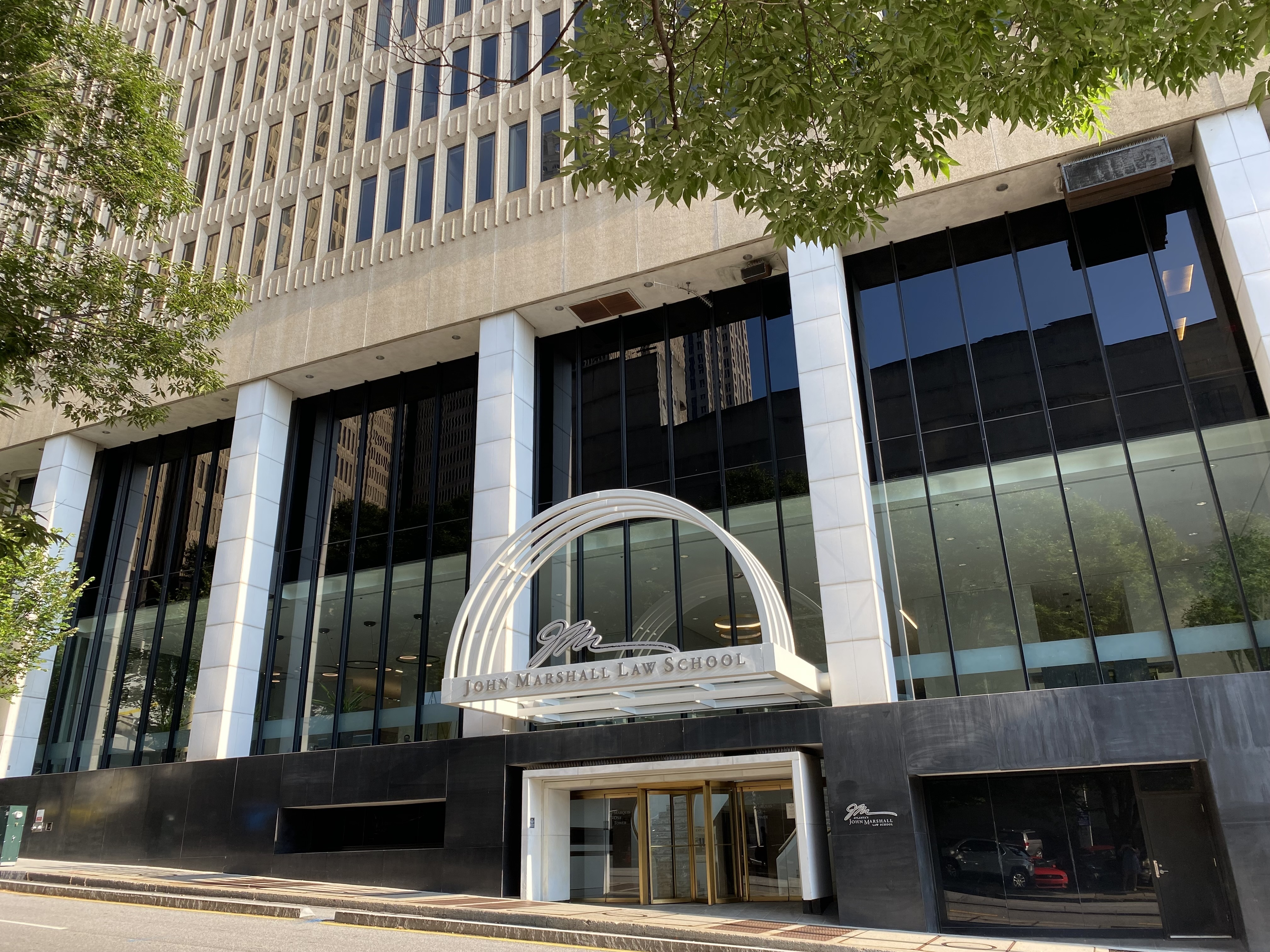
Street entrance

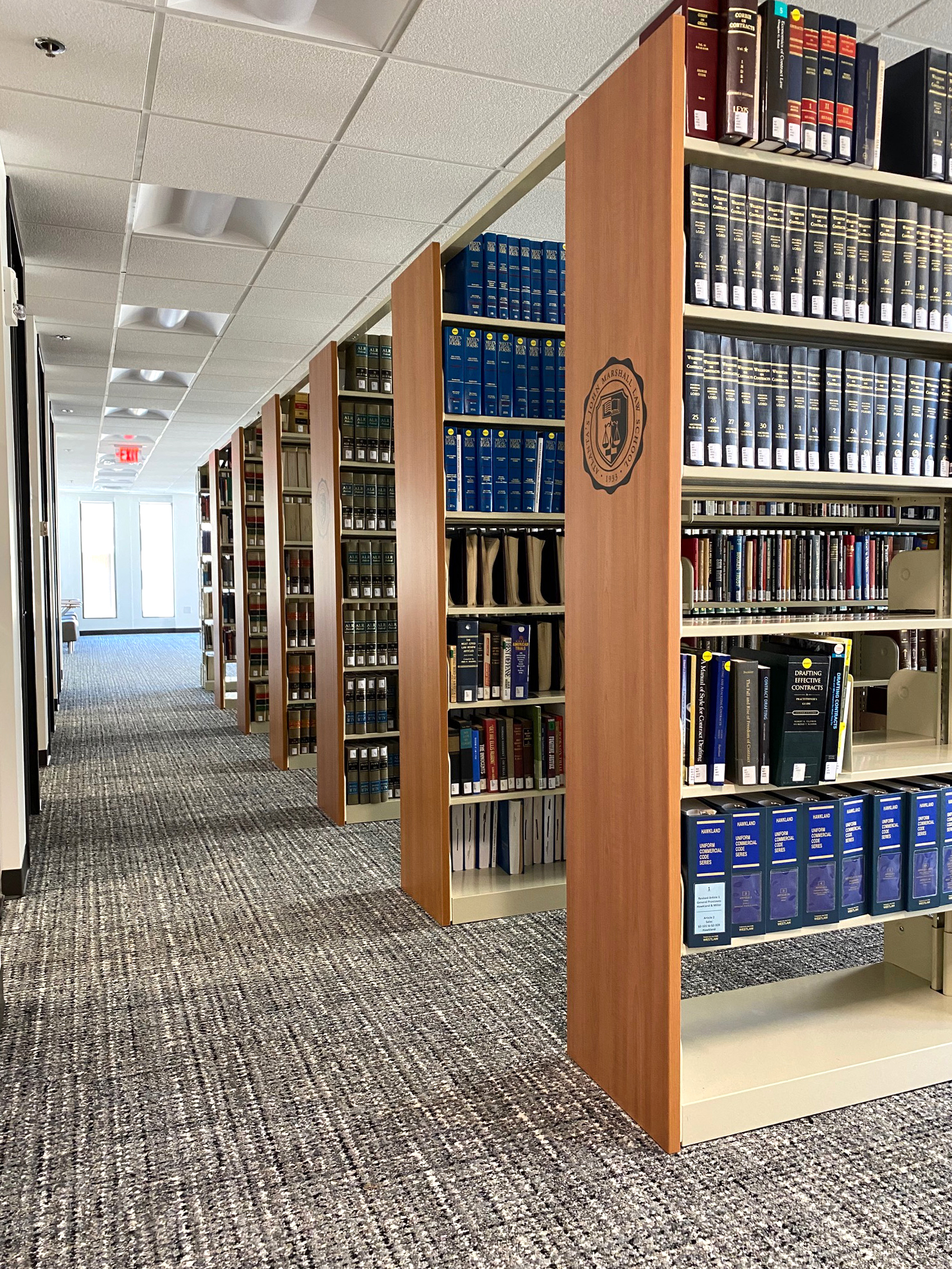
Library stacks

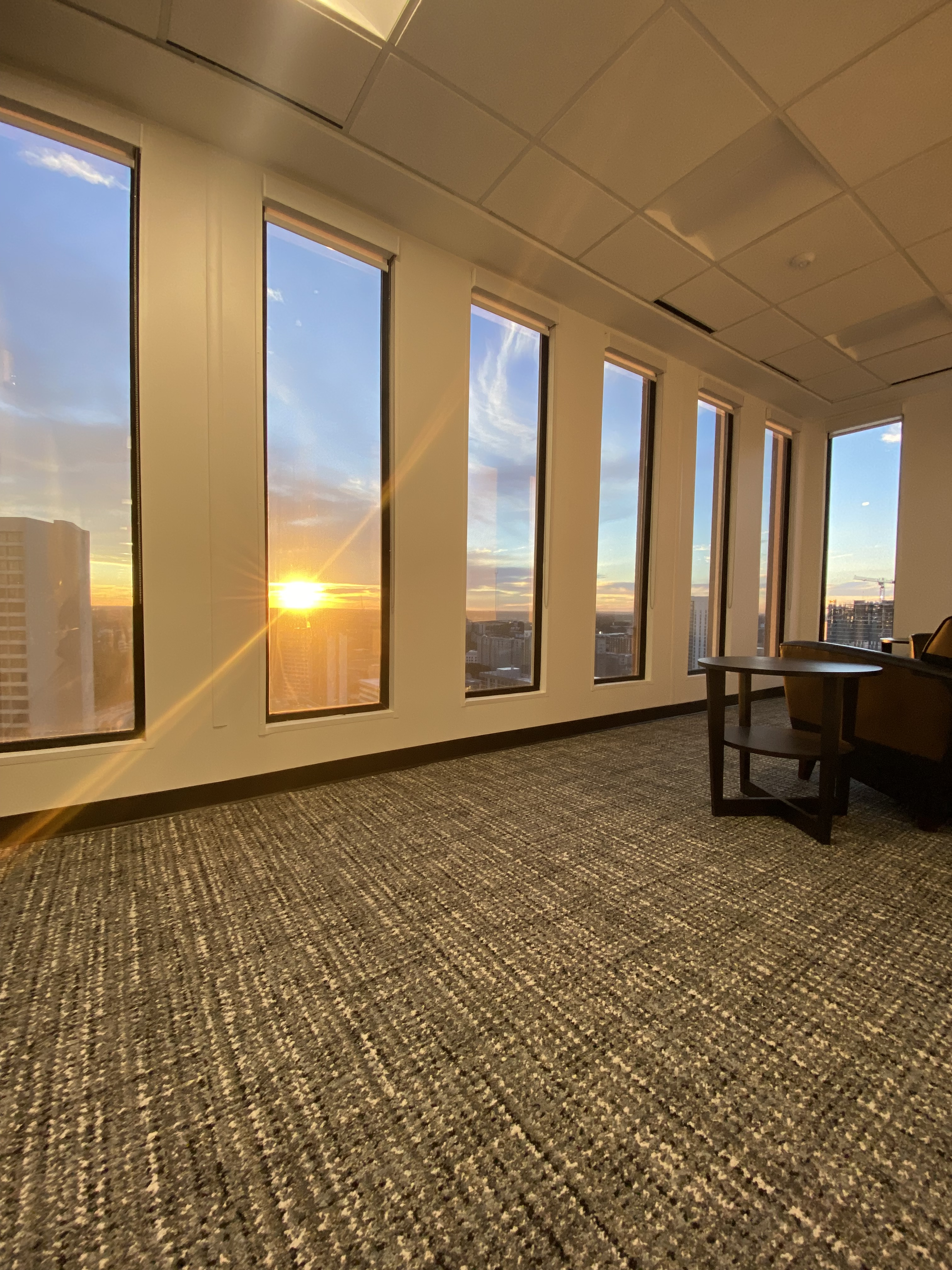
View from 18th floor

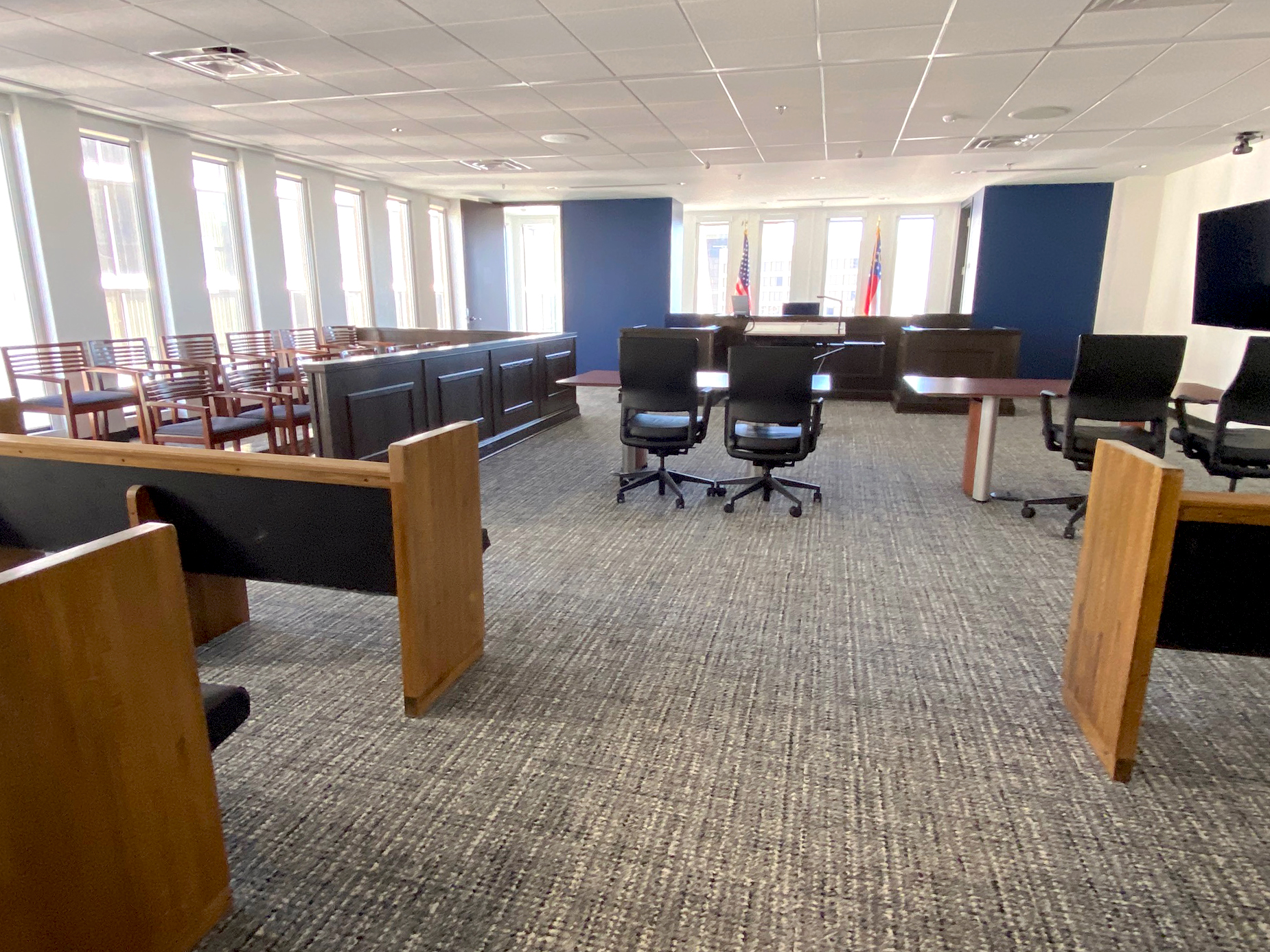
Teaching courtroom

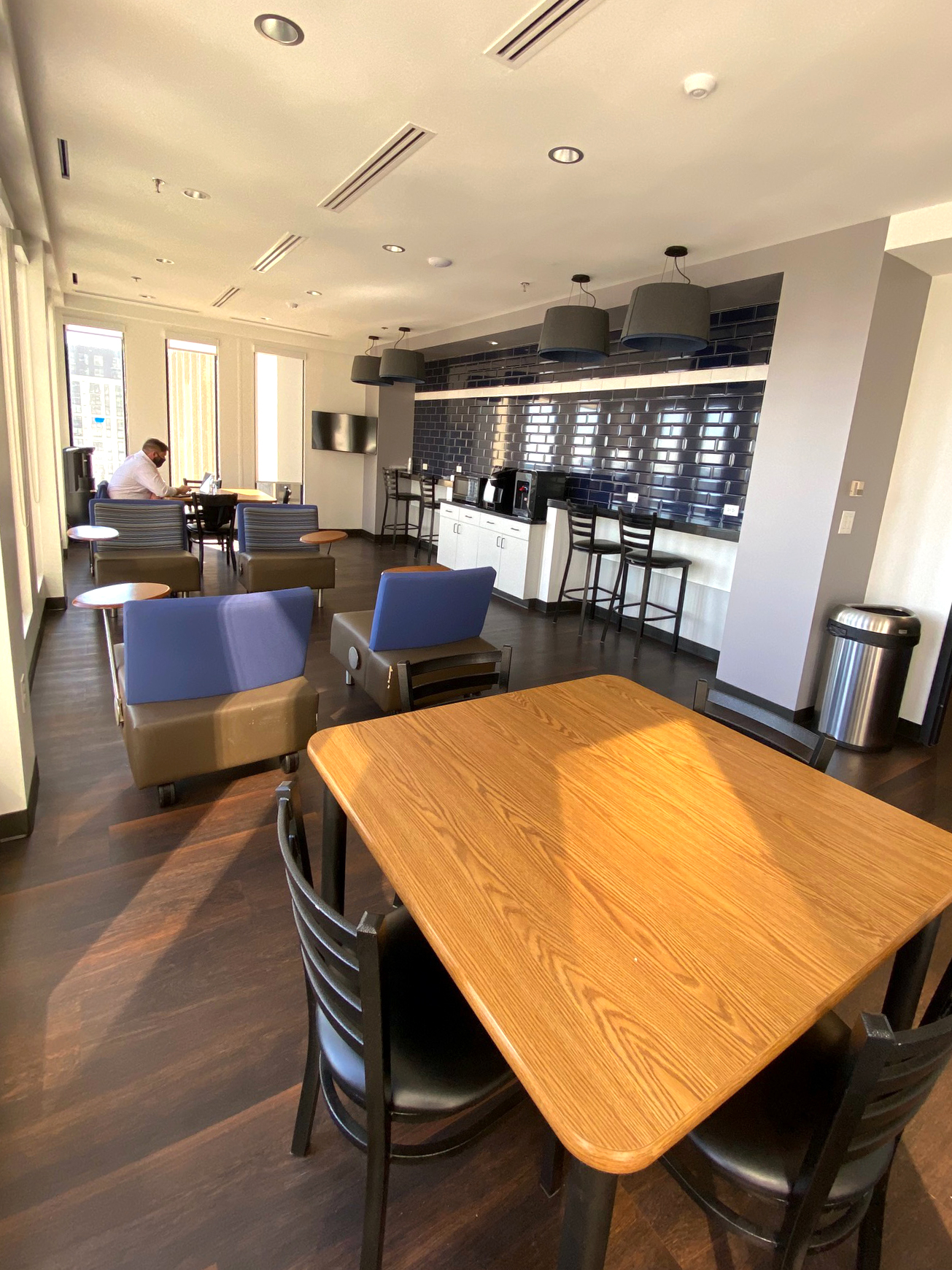
Student lounge and kitchen

After selling its Midtown Atlanta building in 2020, the Law School relocated to Peachtree Center in Downtown Atlanta. After a multi-floor construction project, the Law School took possession of its new campus on August 6, 2021. It is now housed in One Marquis Tower and comprises almost 60,000 square feet of classroom and office space, including a law library and courtroom. The construction project was completed in less than 24 weeks.

== Academics ==
AJMLS is accredited by the American Bar Association. AJMLS offers five J.D. programs: full-time day, part-time day, part-time evening, accelerated/spring start, and a Criminal Justice Certificate Program (led by MacArthur Genius Fellow, Jonathan Rapping). The Certificate Program had previously been offered as the Criminal Justice Honors Program from 2011 to 2018. AJMLS students may apply to co-enroll in the Certificate Program after successful completion of their first year curriculum.

=== Admissions ===
For the class entering in 2022, 45.8% of applicants were accepted, 27.6% of those accepted enrolled, and the enrolled students had an average 3.14 GPA (6 enrollees were not included in the GPA calculation) and an average 151 LSAT score.

=== Experiential learning ===
The experiential learning program at AJMLS combines classroom theory with direct experience by offering students firsthand exposure to the practice of law. The for-credit program consists of legal clinics, intensive externships, and other approved field placements.

Some placements involve criminal prosecution litigation and eligible students may apply for a Prosecuting Attorneys’ Council Third Year Practice Certificate under Georgia's Third-Year Practice Act.

== Student organizations ==
Students attending AJMLS may take part in many independent student organizations. These groups cover such interests as cultural diversity, academics, recreation, and professional and networking opportunities.

Student Organizations for the 2018-2019 Academic Year: Black Law Students Association (BLSA), Christian Legal Society, Charlotte E. Ray Legal Society (CERLS), Corporate and Business Law Society (CABLS), Criminal Law Society, Family Law Society, OUTLaws And Allies, Georgia Association of Women Lawyers (GAWL), Health Law Society, Law Journal, National Lawyers Guild, Phi Alpha Delta, Sports and Entertainment Law Society (SELS), SOLO Practitioners' Law Society, Student Bar Association.

== Employment ==
The ABA Employment Summary shows the total employment rate for 2022 graduates was 85.7% with 60.7% obtaining employment where bar passage is required. According to the report, four graduates were seeking employment while four were not seeking employment, 47 were known to be employed in some capacity (combined attorney and non-attorney employment) of which seven were employed in business & industry, nine were employed in government, two were employed in public interest organizations, and 34 were employed full-time where bar passage is required including one in a law firm of 501+ attorneys, two in firms of 101 - 250 attorneys, one in a firm with 51 - 100 attorneys, two in firms of 26 - 50 attorneys, four in firms of 11 - 25 attorneys, and 18 in firms of 1 - 10 attorneys.

ABA Employment Summary for 2022 Graduates
Employment Status	Percentage
Total Employed	85.71%
Employed - Bar Passage Required	60.71%
Employed - J.D. Advantage	7.14%
Employed - Professional Position	8.93%
Employed - Other Position	7.14%
Employed - Undeterminable	0%
Pursuing Graduate Degree Full Time	0%
Unemployed - Start Date Deferred	1.79%
Unemployed - Not Seeking	7.14%
Unemployed - Seeking	7.14%
Employment Status Unknown	0%
Total of 56 Graduates

== Costs ==
The total cost of attendance (indicating the cost of tuition, fees, and living expenses) at John Marshall for the 2017–2018 academic year is $70,304. The Law School Transparency estimated debt-financed cost of attendance for three years is $256,530.

== Notable alumni ==
- Neal Boortz (1977), author, former attorney, and former libertarian radio host
- Jon G. Burns, Speaker of the Georgia House of Representatives
- Doug Collins (JD, 2007), served as the U.S. representative for Georgia's 9th congressional district from 2013 to 2021 and was appointed United States Secretary of Veterans Affairs in 2025.
- Femi Gbajabiamila (JD), Nigerian lawyer and politician, Chief of Staff to the President of Nigeria since 2023
- Ludlow Porch, radio personality
- Ronald Ramsey Sr., an associate judge of the Traffic Division of DeKalb State Court in DeKalb County
- Nathan Wade lawyer in the Georgia election racketeering prosecution of Donald Trump and other alleged co-conspirators

== Notable faculty ==
- Jonathan Rapping
- Melanie D. Wilson, associate professor 2005–2007

== See also ==
- List of colleges and universities in metropolitan Atlanta
