= Public Defender Service for the District of Columbia =

Public defense organization in Washington DC

The Public Defender Service for the District of Columbia

Organization overview
- Organization executives: Heather Pinckney, Director of PDS; Rudolph "Rudy" Acree, Jr., Deputy Director of PDS
- Website: www.pdsdc.org

The Public Defender Service (PDS) for the District of Columbia provides legal defense to individuals on a court-appointed basis for criminal (at the trial and appellate levels) and delinquency cases indigent adult and juvenile defendants/ respondents. Its Mental Health Division provides representation to persons facing involuntary civil commitment based on allegations that the person is a danger to self or others as a result of mental illness. Its parole division represents parolees charged with violating parole and facing revocation before the United States Parole Commission. PDS also provides other legal-related services in DC.

== History ==
The organization began in 1960 when the United States Congress established the Legal Aid Agency for the District of Columbia (LAA) under the District of Columbia Legal Aid Agency Act for the purpose of representing people who could not afford an attorney in criminal, juvenile, and mental health proceedings. The Bar Association of the District of Columbia's Board of Directors devoted itself in 1955 to promoting the creation of a legal aid entity that would provide "competent and conscientious legal assistance" in a manner that would be "an inspiring example for other communities," issuing its "Report of the Commission on Legal Aid of the Bar Association of the District of Columbia" in 1958. Then-Chief Judge of the U.S. Court of Appeals for the District of Columbia E. Barrett Prettyman, using the report, led a group of lawyers who went to the United States Congress and advocated for the establishment of an office that would focus on more serious criminal cases, juvenile delinquency cases, and mental health cases. LAA would break with past practice by being entirely government-funded and would be completely independent from the executive, judicial, and legislative branches of government.

In 1963, the United States Supreme Court's decision in Gideon v. Wainwright recognized the constitutional right to counsel in criminal cases for people unable to afford their own attorneys in felony matters. Shortly thereafter, LAA leadership crafted the 1970 statute that established the current District of Columbia Public Defender Service (PDS), broadened the mandate to include the Appointment of Counsel Program (now the Defender Services Office) and the Offender Rehabilitation Division (now the Office of Rehabilitation and Development), and secured the apolitical role of the PDS Board of Trustees. PDS's mandate was to provide representation for up to sixty percent of the persons who are annually determined to be financially unable to obtain adequate representation. Those not represented by PDS are represented by private attorneys compensated through Criminal Justice Act (CJA). In 1974, the Law Enforcement Assistance Administration of the U.S. Department of Justice (DOJ) labelled PDS as an "exemplary project" and model for other jurisdictions.

PDS has been innovative in the delivery of legal services with the implementation of PDS's Correctional Services Program (services now provided by the Parole Division and the Institutional Services Program) in 1974, the Volunteer and Intern Program (now the Criminal Law Internship Program) in 1977, the Juvenile Services Program in 1982, a special litigation counsel position (now the Special Litigation Division and the Special Counsel to the Director for Legislative Affairs) in 1988/1989, the Community Defender Program (now the Community Defender Division) in 2000, and the Civil Legal Services Unit (now the Civil Legal Services Division) in 2001. PDS also established its Forensic Practice Group (FPG) in 2001 in response to its concerns that no current scientific method ensures the accuracy and reliability of many of the tools used to investigate and prove criminal cases and that across the nation, inconsistent practices are applied regarding such critical matters as who collects the evidence, how it is processed, and how it is interpreted.

== Organization ==
=== Trial Division ===
Attorneys in the Trial Division represent adults in criminal proceedings in the District of Columbia Superior Court and children in juvenile delinquency matters. Attorneys are assigned to specific levels of cases based on experience and performance. Some attorneys in the Trial Division handle cases involving DNA evidence, expert testimony, multiple-count indictments, and novel or complex legal matters. PDS attorneys provide representation in the majority of the most serious adult felony cases filed in D.C. Superior Court each year.

=== Appellate Division ===
Attorneys in the Appellate Division handle the appellate litigation generated in PDS cases, provide legal advice to Criminal Justice Act attorneys who require assistance in appellate matters, and respond to requests from the District of Columbia Court of Appeals for briefs in non-PDS cases involving novel or complex legal issues. Another important function of the Appellate Division is to provide a wide range of technical assistance and training to other PDS divisions.

=== Mental Health Division ===
Attorneys in the Mental Health Division (MHD) handle involuntary civil commitment cases that arise in DC Superior Court. PDS is initially appointed when a person is detained in a mental hospital upon allegations that the person is a danger to self or others as a result of mental illness. MHD lawyers also represent persons in post-commitment proceedings, including commitment reviews and outpatient revocation hearings, as well as in involuntary commitment proceedings of persons found incompetent to stand trial because of mental illness, and in matters relating to persons found not guilty by reason of insanity in DC Superior Court or United States district court cases. The lawyers in this division also provide information to the Council of the District of Columbia on proposed mental health and mental retardation legislation, conduct training sessions on the rights of mentally ill persons involved in civil commitment actions, and provide legal assistance to Criminal Justice Act lawyers appointed by the court to handle involuntary civil commitment cases.

=== Special Litigation Division ===
The Special Litigation Division handles a wide variety of litigation related to the constitutional rights of PDS clients and reforming systemic criminal justice system practices.

=== Parole Division ===
The Parole Division provides representation to DC Code offenders facing revocation before the United States Parole Commission and their appeals before the National Appeals Board. In addition, this division provides legal assistance to DC inmates housed throughout the country in Federal Bureau of Prisons facilities who write letters requesting counseling regarding parole eligibility matters and other related issues.

=== Community Defender Division ===
As part of PDS’s holistic approach to public defense, the Community Defender Division (CDD) provides services to adults and children, primarily those who are in the post-adjudication stage of a criminal or juvenile delinquency case in Superior Court. CDD provides its services through specialized programs for adult and juvenile clients. The Community Defender Division provides services through two programs: 1) the Juvenile Services Program (JSP) represents children at institutional disciplinary hearings at the District of Columbia's youth detention centers and works with community organizations to develop reentry programs that address the special needs of children; and 2) the Prisoner & Reentry Legal Services Program (PRLS) responds to the legal and social services needs of incarcerated persons and newly released individuals convicted of DC Code offenses.

=== Civil Legal Services Division ===
The Civil Legal Services Division (CLS) provides services addressing issues facing children in the juvenile delinquency system. CLS has a team of special education attorneys who are experts in advocacy under the federal Individuals with Disabilities in Education Act (IDEA). In addition, CLS addresses other rehabilitative needs of these children and of adult clients by providing representation in civil matters arising out of their criminal charges — public benefits entitlement, housing, child support, and health care services. CLS also provides consultation for attorneys with clients in the criminal justice system who face immigration consequences.

=== Investigations Division ===
The Investigations Division is composed of rigorously-trained, professional investigators who are in-house PDS staff members. Staff investigators provide support to the Trial, Appellate, Parole, Mental Health, Civil Legal Services, Community Defender and Office of Rehabilitation and Development divisions. Investigators assist PDS attorneys at all stages of a case beginning the day the case arrives to the agency. PDS investigators visit crime scenes, locate and interview witnesses, contribute to the development of defense theories, collect and analyze evidence, records and discovery materials and testify in court in relation to their investigations. As the PDS Criminal Law Internship Program falls under the purview of the Investigations Division, participating interns work closely with staff investigators. The Investigations Division is responsible for the provision of ongoing, accredited, external training to many investigators working in the District of Columbia in connection to the Criminal Justice Act. Staff investigators also provide additional external training at the local and national level, notably for the National Defense Investigator Association at its annual conferences.

== Legislation ==
The District of Columbia Courts, Public Defender Service, and Court Services and Offender Supervision Agency Act of 2014 (H.R. 4185) is a bill that would make changes to the District of Columbia Official Code that governs the D.C. Courts system.

== Notable alumni ==
- Barbara A. Babcock
- Corinne A. Beckwith
- Stephen Bright
- David Cicilline
- Tanya S. Chutkan
- Catharine F. Easterly
- Todd E. Edelman
- James Forman Jr.
- Stephen H. Glickman
- Kristin Henning
- Peter Hoagland
- Vida Johnson
- Cynthia E. Jones
- Alec Karakatsanis
- W. Gary Kohlman
- James Simon Kunen
- Amit Priyavadan Mehta
- Charles Ogletree
- Karl Racine
- Jonathan Rapping
- Michele A. Roberts
- Louis Michael Seidman
- Ronald S. Sullivan Jr.
- Ricardo M. Urbina
- Robert L. Wilkins
