= Jonathan Rapping =

American criminal defense attorney

Jonathan A. Rapping
- Born: Pittsburgh, Pennsylvania, U.S.
- Education: University of Chicago (AB); Princeton University (MPA); George Washington University Law School (JD)
- Occupation: President of Gideon's Promise
- Known for: Founding Gideon's Promise
- Spouse: Ilham Askia
- Children: Aaliyah Rapping, Lucas Rapping
- Parent(s): Elayne Rapping; Leonard Rapping
- Website: Gideon's Promise

Jonathan A. Rapping is an American criminal defense attorney, founder and president of Gideon's Promise, professor of law at Atlanta's John Marshall Law School, and visiting professor of law at Harvard Law School. Rapping received the MacArthur "Genius" Award in 2014.

Rapping regularly writes about issues related to criminal defense and the criminal justice system. He is a contributor for The Nation, TalkPoverty.org, the National Association For Public Defense, and The Huffington Post. He also maintains a blog called Fulfilling the Promise: Insights to Forging a Path to Meaningful Justice Reform.

== Early life, family and education ==
Rapping grew up in Pittsburgh, Pennsylvania. At a young age, Rapping went to demonstrations and protests with his mother, Elayne Rapping, a community organizer, activist and professor in Pittsburgh. Rapping's mother was particularly involved in the anti-war and women's movements. The experience of working with his activist mother taught Rapping about social justice, and trying to change things in the world that aren't fair or right. Friends of Rapping's family were arrested and he admired the lawyers who worked to keep them out of jail. After witnessing social justice activism as a young person, Rapping aspired to be a criminal defense attorney at a young age.

Rapping attended Allderdice High School in Squirrel Hill, and graduated in 1984. After high school, Rapping attended the University of Chicago where he earned a Bachelor of Arts degree in economics cum laude. People close to Rapping convinced him that he would incur tremendous debt if he went to law school, so he worked as a research assistant with the Federal Reserve Board in Washington, D.C. for two years, following in the footsteps of his father, Leonard Rapping, a well-known economist. Rapping earned a scholarship to attend the Woodrow Wilson School of Public and International Affairs at Princeton University where he earned a Master of Public Administration in 1992. Rapping's sister, Alison Rapping has spent her career in the non-profit sector, and is widely considered a leader in that realm. Both siblings attribute their commitment to social justice to the influence of their parents.

Right after graduating from Princeton and still unfulfilled, Rapping decided to attend George Washington University Law School. After his first year of law school at GWU, Rapping interned with the Public Defender Service for the District of Columbia, where he found his calling. He worked at PDS throughout law school.

While living in Washington, Rapping met and married his wife, Ilham Askia, who was teaching at an elementary school and then spent two years at a charter high school for court involved children. Askia was born in Buffalo, New York and every man in her family has been a subject of the criminal justice system. Askia's father went to Attica Correctional Facility when she was five years old. She helped raise her younger brother who ended up in prison. Askia became a teacher to break the school-to-prison pipeline, but soon questioned how much of a difference she could make on the front end. This led to her joining Rapping to start Gideon's Promise and, ultimately, to become the organization's Executive Director, where she advocates for attacking the pipeline on the back end.

== Legal career ==
=== Public defender ===
After law school, Rapping worked as a staff attorney for The Public Defender Service for the District of Columbia (1995–2004), where he served his final three years as training director. From 2004-2006, Rapping was the training director for the Georgia Public Defender Standards Council.

From 2006-2007, he served as training chief for the New Orleans Office of the Public Defender. In recognition of his work in New Orleans to rebuild the public defender system post-Hurricane Katrina, he was a co-recipient of the Lincoln Leadership Award, given by Kentucky's Department of Public Advocacy to honor leadership in national efforts to improve indigent defense.

=== Gideon's Promise ===
In 2007, Rapping created the Southern Public Defender Training Center, subsequently renamed Gideon's Promise, along with his wife, Ilham Askia. Named after the landmark 1963 Supreme Court case Gideon v. Wainwright, Gideon's Promise teaches public defenders to work more effectively within the judicial system by providing coaching, training, and professional development as well as a supportive network of peers and mentors from around the country. Rapping received a grant to help start the center from George Soros' Open Society Foundations.

Since its founding, the organization has grown from a single training program for sixteen attorneys in two offices in Georgia and Louisiana, to a multi-tiered enterprise with over 300 participants in more than 35 offices across 15 mostly Southern states. An initial three-year "Core" program for new public defenders has since expanded into a comprehensive model that includes programs for graduates of the initial Core program as they continue their development, public defender leaders, trainers and supervisors, and law students. Further, the organization is unique in that it intervenes at the trial stage, rather than after conviction, where challenges to criminal injustice often take place.

In 2013, HBO Films produced a documentary called Gideon's Army, based in part on the Gideon's Promise program and highlighting participants in the program.

Gideon's Promise has won numerous awards including Emory University's 2014 Martin Luther King, Jr. Community Service Award, the Southern Center for Human Rights' 2013 Gideon's Promise Award, The National Association of Sentencing Advocates and Mitigation Specialists 2013 Sentencing Project Award, and the American College of Trail Lawyers' 2011 Emil Gumpert Award.

In 2014, Rapping became the Director of Strategic Planning and Organizational Development for the Maryland Office of the Public Defender. In 2014, Rapping earned a MacArthur Foundation "Genius Fellow."

=== Law professor ===
Since 2007, Rapping has also been an associate professor at Atlanta's John Marshall Law School. In 2015 he was promoted to full Professor. Rapping is also a visiting associate professor of law at Harvard Law School. In 2009, Rapping was selected as one of Harvard Law School's Wasserstein Public Interest Fellows in recognition of his contribution to the public interest legal arena. In 2013, Rapping was the Public Interest Scholar in Residence at Touro Law Center.

== Contributions to scholarly and professional journals ==
- Grooming Tomorrow's Change Agents: The Role of Law Schools in Helping to Create a Just Society, 12 Ohio St. J. Crim. L. 465 (2015).
- The Revolution Will Be Televised: Popular Culture and the American Criminal Justice Narrative, 41 New Eng. J. on Crim. & Civ. Confinement 5 (2015).
- Retuning Gideon's Trumpet: Telling the Story in the Context of Today's Criminal-Justice Crisis, 92 Tex. L. Rev. 1225 (2014).
- Reclaiming Our Rightful Place: Reviving the Hero Image of the Public Defender, 99 Iowa L. Rev. 1893 (2014).
- What Does A Client Have the Right to Demand?, 10 Tenn. J.L. & Pol'y 113 (2014).
- The Role of the Defender in A Racially Disparate System, Champion, July 2013, at 50.
- Implicitly Unjust: How Defenders Can Affect Systemic Racist Assumptions, 16 N.Y.U. J. Legis. & Pub. Pol'y 999, 1000 (2013).
- Who's Guarding the Henhouse? How the American Prosecutor Came to Devour Those He Is Sworn to Protect, 51 Washburn L.J. 513, 514 (2012).
- Redefining Success As A Public Defender: A Rallying Cry for Those Most Committed to Gideon's Promise, Champion, June 2012, at 30.
- Street Crimes, Stress, and Suggestion: Helping the Jury See What the Witness Did Not, Champion, June 2011, at 22, 23.
- National Crisis, National Neglect: Realizing Justice Through Transformative Change, 13 U. Pa. J.L. & Soc. Change 331 (2010).
- Evidence Blocking: How the Defense Can Define the Legal Landscape at Trial, 33 Am. J. Trial Advoc. 1, 1 (2009).
- You Can't Build on Shaky Ground: Laying the Foundation for Indigent Defense Reform Through Values-Based Recruitment, Training, and Mentoring, 3 Harv. L. & Pol'y Rev. 161 (2009).
- A Picture's Worth a Thousand Words: Persuasion Through the Use of Visual Effects At Trial, The Advocate, Journal of Criminal Justice Education and Research, Kentucky Department of Public Advocacy, Vol. 31, Issue No. 4, Oct. 2009.
- Directing the Winds of Change: Using Organizational Culture to Reform Indigent Defense, 9 Loy. J. Pub. Int. L 177 (2008).
- Building A Relationship With Your Client, The Advocate, Journal of Criminal Justice Education and Research, Kentucky Department of Public Advocacy, Vol. 27, Issue No. 6, Nov. 2005.

== Other writings ==
- The Limitation of Policy Fixes: Real Criminal Justice Reform Requires That We Change How We Think About Justice (personal blog), June 3, 2015.
- Gideon's Promise Works to Ensure Equal Justice For All, Nonprofit Voice, Georgia Center For Nonprofits, May 21, 2015.
- The Other Baltimore Story: Ronald Hammond and "Routine Injustice,' Talk Poverty, May 15, 2015.
- Challenging Judge Centered Culture, Fulfilling the Promise: Insights to Forging a Path to Meaningful Justice Reform (personal blog), April 6, 2015.
- Mississippi Judge Bars Public Defenders From Representing Clients, Talk Poverty, March 20, 2015.
- Indigent Defense is History, Fulfilling the Promise: Insights to Forging a Path to Meaningful Justice Reform (personal blog), March 18, 2015.
- Forgive Yourself Without Becoming Complacent; Dream Without Becoming Discouraged, National Association of Public Defense, February 9, 2015.
- Continuing the March of the Civil Rights Warriors in Selma, Talk Poverty, February 5, 2015.
- It's Not Just the Cops, The Nation, January 12, 2015.
- Need a Lawyer? Sell Everything, Talk Poverty, December 15, 2014.
- Ferguson and Staten Island: In Case Anyone Doubted the Public Needs Defending..., National Association of Public Defense, December 10, 2014.
- One of the Most Important Civil and Human Rights Battles of Our Time, Talk Poverty, November 10, 2014.
- Reviving the Hero Image of the Public Defender By Changing the Story of Our Clients, National Association of Public Defense, July 21, 2014.
- To All the Patriots Out There, and Especially Our Public Defenders, National Association of Public Defense, July 4, 2014.
- Gideon's Orchestra: It's Time For the Encore, National Association of Public Defense, May 27, 2014.
- The Special Few, National Association of Public Defense, April 9, 2014.
- Can We Be Committed To Both the Client and the Cause? Promoting Racial Justice Through Individual Representation, National Association for Public Defense, January 20, 2014.
- You Can't Get Upstream Without Swimming Against the Current, National Association for Public Defense, December 9, 2013.
- Who Will Heal the Public Defenders, National Association for Public Defense, October 7, 2013.
- The Role of the Defender in a Racially Disparate System, The Champion, National Association of Criminal Defense Lawyers (July 2103).
- The dog sniff cases: Amidst a Sigh of Relief, Additional Burden for Public Defenders," Justice Watch, Alliance For Justice, March 28, 2013.
- A Promise Worth Keeping, Huffington Post, March 18, 2013.
- Book Review: "Case Analysis: Winning Hard Cases Against the Odds," James McComas, The Champion, National Association of Criminal Defense Lawyers (April 2012).
- Should Courts Let Experts Testify on Eyewitness Identifications? Congressional Quarterly Researcher, October 14, 2011
- Don't Gut Public Defenders, Savannah Times, February 21, 2009

== Awards and recognition ==
- 2014 MacArthur Fellow
- 2015 Twenty People to Watch, Creative Loafing
- 2014 Purpose Economy 100, Inaugural Class
- 2014 INSPIRE Award, Cardozo Law School
- 2013 Distinguished Public Interest Lawyer in Residence, Touro Law School
- 2009 Wasserstein Public Interest Fellow, Harvard Law School
- Co-Recipient, 2007 Lincoln Leadership Award
- 2007 Soros Justice Advocacy Fellow
