= Lewis Grizzard =

American journalist (1946–1994)

- Born: October 20, 1946; Fort Benning, Georgia, US
- Died: March 20, 1994 (aged 47); Atlanta, Georgia, US
- Education: University of Georgia (ABJ)
- Occupations: Writer, humorist
- Spouse: 4
- Children: 1 (adopted)
- Writing career
- Period: 1969–1994

Lewis McDonald Grizzard Jr. (October 20, 1946 – March 20, 1994) was an American writer and humorist, known for his Southern demeanor and commentary on the American South. Although he spent his early career as a newspaper sports writer and editor, becoming the sports editor of the Atlanta Journal at age 23, he is much better known for his humorous newspaper columns in the Atlanta Journal-Constitution. He was also a popular stand-up comedian and lecturer.

Grizzard also published a total of 25 books, including collections of his columns (e.g. Chili Dawgs Always Bark at Night), expanded versions of his stand-up comedy routines (I Haven't Understood Anything Since 1962), and the autobiographical If I Ever Get Back to Georgia, I'm Gonna Nail My Feet to the Ground. Although much of his comedy discussed the South and Grizzard's personal and professional lives, it was also a commentary on issues prevalent throughout America, including relationships between men and women (e.g. If Love Were Oil, I'd Be About a Quart Low), politics, and health, especially heart health. Grizzard was also the stepbrother of the Southern humorist Ludlow Porch.

== Biography ==
Grizzard was born at Fort Benning, Georgia. His father, Lewis Grizzard Sr., was a soldier in the United States Army who served in both World War II and the Korean War, and was a sole survivor of a Chinese attack that wiped out his platoon. Lewis Sr. left his wife Christine, a school teacher, when Lewis Jr. was young, and mother and son moved in with Christine's parents in Moreland, Georgia, where Lewis spent the rest of his childhood. Grizzard recounted his often frustrating relationship with his father in My Daddy Was a Pistol and I'm a Son of a Gun, and blamed his father's difficulties in civilian life on what at the time was called "battle fatigue" and is now called post-traumatic stress disorder, saying, "Daddy came home from his second war" (the Korean War) "a complete mess, the Army did nothing to help him, and he died young." He began his writing early, publishing stories of his Little League team in the nearby Newnan Times-Herald, Newnan, Georgia.

Grizzard attended the University of Georgia in Athens, where he was a member of the Sigma Pi fraternity and Gridiron Secret Society. During his time in Athens, he became an avid Georgia Bulldogs fan. He studied journalism, but he shunned the school newspaper in favor of writing for the Athens Daily News. Before graduating with a bachelor's degree in journalism, Grizzard moved to Atlanta, joining the Atlanta Journal, and becoming the youngest-ever executive sports editor of the Journal at the age of 23. The executive editor of the Journal, Jim Minter, said that Grizzard was one of the "brightest minds" in American journalism. His time there included writing about the Marshall University football team tragedy and the Journal's coverage of Hank Aaron's 715th home run.

Grizzard left the Journal to become the executive sports editor of the Chicago Sun-Times. He later recalled this as the most miserable period of his life. His tenure included a controversy involving the removal of several news columns written by Lacy Banks, the Sun-Times' first African-American sports columnist, which resulted in Banks charging racism against Grizzard and led to Banks's subsequent firing. Although the newspaper, under editor Jim Hoge, supported Grizzard, a federal arbitrator reinstated Banks, and he criticized Grizzard as "racially insensitive". Grizzard, for his part, contended that the arbitrator did not understand the newspaper business, and he pointed out that he had replaced Banks with Thom Greer, who was also African-American, and who later became one of the first Black editors of a major daily newspaper. Grizzard felt this invalidated any charge of racism. One Chicago radio announcer who sympathized with Grizzard said that Grizzard had been pronounced "guilty by geography". Grizzard was also divorced for the second time while living in Chicago. Grizzard's career as a newspaperman in Chicago is recalled in If I Ever Get Back to Georgia, I'm Gonna Nail My Feet to the Ground.

In 1977, Grizzard returned to Atlanta as a columnist for the sports section of the Atlanta Constitution newspaper. After eight months, he switched to writing the humor/life column that eventually made him famous. He published this column about four days per week. At his peak, he was syndicated in 450 newspapers and made regular appearances on television and the stand-up comedy circuit. His popularity in Atlanta was such that the alternative newspaper Creative Loafing, in its annual "Best of Atlanta" poll, included the categories "Best Columnist" and "Best Columnist besides Lewis Grizzard".

Grizzard often drew criticism for his disparaging remarks about gay people and feminists, and his dislike for the New South and reflections on the "Old South" of his youth were frequently misinterpreted. Nevertheless, he was extremely popular in the South, and he had enduring popularity across the nation because of the perceived humor, humanity, patriotism, and "old-fashioned" values that permeated his writing. His frequent bewilderment by sociocultural trends in the 1980s and 1990s struck a chord with baby boom readers. Grizzard refused to use computers, writing every column or book on a regular typewriter. ("When I write, I like to hear some noise", he wrote.) He wrote New York Times Best Sellers, was profiled by The Washington Post and The New York Times, and appeared several times on The Tonight Show Starring Johnny Carson.

In 1984, Grizzard fulfilled the two remaining course requirements for his journalism degree from the University of Georgia. He made his acting debut on the sitcom Designing Women, in the episode "Oh Brother", which first aired on 18 January 1988. Grizzard played the role of Clayton Sugarbaker, the half-brother of Julia and Suzanne Sugarbaker. Clayton was a former mental patient aspiring to be a stand-up comedian.

Grizzard had a somewhat troubled life, battling alcoholism, and going through three divorces. He was voted "the Author From Hell" at a publishing convention for his behavior on book tours. He also suffered from a congenital heart defect — a valve problem. In his own words, "There are three little leaflets that control the flow of blood to the heart. I was born with only two of those leaflets. It was just after the Great War, so there may have been a shortage. Either that or my daddy didn't get a good toe-hold." His near-death after his third valve-replacement surgery in 1993 brought in over 50,000 letters from well-wishers. He later attributed his miraculous recovery to the prayers of his fans.

As Grizzard was working on his twenty-first book, and a few days after marrying for the fourth time, he died of complications of aortic mass and his fourth heart-valve surgery. Prior to his surgery, survival of which was 50–50, he was asked if he had any questions; his reply: "I just have one question: When's the next bus to Albuquerque?" Grizzard suffered from extensive brain damage following the nine-hour operation, according to cardiologist Randy Martin. He never regained consciousness, eventually had no brain activity and, according to his instructions, was allowed to die. In accordance with his wishes, his body was cremated, and some of his ashes were scattered at the 50-yard line of Sanford Stadium at the University of Georgia. The typewriter he used to author columns about the Atlanta Braves' 1991 "worst to first" season is on display in the library of the University of Georgia's Grady College of Journalism and Mass Communication, which has a scholarship in his name. Several journalism schools, including his alma mater, have classes in the "Grizzard" style of writing.

Grizzard never fathered any children, but he did adopt the daughter of his fourth wife.

A Lewis Grizzard Museum, featuring personal effects and professional memorabilia such as his typewriter, is now open in Moreland, Georgia. Originally housed in a gas station by a fan, it has been moved to a new, two-story museum complex (the former Moreland Mill).

== Published works ==
- Kathy Sue Loudermilk, I Love You: A Good Beer Joint Is Hard to Find and Other Facts of Life (1 December 1979) (collection of columns previously published in The Atlanta Journal-Constitution)
- Won't You Come Home, Billy Bob Bailey?: An Assortment of Home-Cooked Journalism for People Who Wonder Why Clean Underwear Doesn't Grow on Trees (1 November 1980) (collection of columns previously published in The Atlanta Journal-Constitution)
- Glory! Glory! Georgia's 1980 Championship Season: The Inside Story (1981) (Loran Smith with Lewis Grizzard)
- Don't Sit Under the Grits Tree With Anyone Else but Me (1 November 1981) (collection of columns previously published in The Atlanta Journal-Constitution)
- They Tore Out My Heart and Stomped That Sucker Flat (1 October 1982)
- If Love Were Oil, I'd Be About a Quart Low (1 October 1983)
- Elvis Is Dead and I Don't Feel So Good Myself (1 October 1984)
- Shoot Low Boys - They're Riding Shetland Ponies (1 October 1985)
- My Daddy Was a Pistol and I'm a Son of a Gun (1 October 1986)
- When My Love Returns From the Ladies Room, Will I Be Too Old To Care? (1 October 1987) (collection of columns previously published in The Atlanta Journal-Constitution)
- Don't Bend Over in the Garden, Granny - You Know Them Taters Got Eyes (1 October 1988)
- Lewis Grizzard on Fear of Flying (1 April 1989)
- Lewis Grizzard's Advice To The Newly Wed ... & the Newly Divorced (1 April 1989)
- Chili Dawgs Always Bark At Night (1 September 1989) (collection of columns previously published in The Atlanta Journal-Constitution)
- Does a Wild Bear Chip in the Woods? (1 May 1990)
- If I Ever Get Back to Georgia, I'm Gonna Nail My Feet to the Ground (1 October 1990)
- Don't Forget To Call Your Momma; I Wish I Could Call Mine (1 April 1991)
- You Can't Put No Boogie Woogie on the King of Rock and Roll (1 October 1991) (collection of columns previously published in The Atlanta Journal-Constitution)
- I Haven't Understood Anything Since 1962 and Other Nekkid Truths (1 October 1992)
- I Took a Lickin' and Kept on Tickin' and Now I Believe in Miracles (1 January 1994)

=== Posthumous collections ===
- The Last Bus To Albuquerque (1 September 1994) (collection of columns previously published in The Atlanta Journal-Constitution)
- It Wasn't Always Easy But I Sure Had Fun (1 November 1994) (collection of previously published material)
- Life Is Like a Dogsled Team ... If You're Not the Lead Dog, the Scenery Never Changes — The Wit and Wisdom of Lewis Grizzard (1 May 1995) (collection of previously published material)
- Grizzardisms: The Wit and Wisdom of Lewis Grizzard (1 June 1995) (collection of previously published material)
- Southern by the Grace of God — Lewis Grizzard on the South (1 May 1996) (collection of previously published material)

== Live comedy albums ==
- On the Road With Lewis Grizzard (1985)
- Live! (From Moreland to Moscow) (1986)
- Let's Have a Party! With Lewis Grizzard (1987)
- Addicted to Love (Live) (1989)
- Don't Believe I'da Told That (1991)
- The Best of Lewis Grizzard (1994) (collection of previously released material)
- One Last Time (1994)
- Alimony: The Bill You Get, for the Thrill You Got (1994)
- Lewis Grizzard (2001) (collection of previously released material)
- An Evening with Lewis Grizzard (2001) (DVD)
