= District of Columbia Courts, Public Defender Service, and Court Services and Offender Supervision Agency Act of 2014 =

- Long title: To revise certain authorities of the District of Columbia courts, the Court Services and Offender Supervision Agency for the District of Columbia, and the Public Defender Service for the District of Columbia, and for other purposes.
- Announced in: the 113th United States Congress
- Sponsored by: Del. Eleanor Holmes Norton (D, DC-0)
- Number of co-sponsors: 0

Codification
- U.S.C. sections affected: 5 U.S.C. § 5901

Legislative history
- Introduced in the House as H.R. 4185 by Del. Eleanor Holmes Norton (D, DC-0) on March 10, 2014; Committee consideration by United States House Committee on Oversight and Government Reform; Passed the House on July 14, 2014 (voice vote)

The District of Columbia Courts, Public Defender Service, and Court Services and Offender Supervision Agency Act of 2014 (H.R. 4185) is a bill that would make changes to the District of Columbia Official Code that governs the D.C. Courts system.

The bill was introduced and passed in the United States House of Representatives during the 113th United States Congress.

== Provisions of the bill ==
This summary is based largely on the summary provided by the Congressional Research Service, a public domain source.

The District of Columbia Courts, Public Defender Service, and Court Services and Offender Supervision Agency Act of 2014 would amend the District of Columbia Code to authorize the Executive Officer of the District of Columbia courts to:

- collect debts owed to the District of Columbia Courts because of erroneous payments made to current and former court employees, or any other debt; and
- purchase uniforms to be worn by certain nonjudicial employees of the District courts, so long as the cost of furnishing a uniform during a year does not exceed the amount applicable to the uniform allowance for federal employees.

The bill would amend the National Capital Revitalization and Self-Government Improvement Act of 1997 (NCRS-GIA) to authorize the Director of the Court Services and Offender Supervision Agency to develop and operate intermediate incentive programs for sentenced offenders.

The bill would make permanent the Director's authority to accept, solicit, and use on behalf of the Agency: (1) any monetary or nonmonetary gift, donation, bequest, or use of facilities, property, or services to aid or facilitate the work of the Agency; and (2) reimbursements from the District government for space and services provided, on a cost reimbursable basis.

The bill would amend the NCRS-GIA to:

- authorize the Public Defender Service for the District of Columbia, upon approval of the Board of Trustees, to accept and use public grants, private contributions, and voluntary and uncompensated (gratuitous) services to assist it. (Currently, the Service is authorized only to accept but not use these grants and contributions.); and
- deem members of the Board of Trustees, as of October 21, 1998, to be employees of the Service instead of District employees for purposes of any action brought against them.

== Congressional Budget Office report ==
This summary is based largely on the summary provided by the Congressional Budget Office, as ordered reported by the House Committee on Oversight and Government Reform on March 12, 2014. This is a public domain source.

H.R. 4185 would make changes to the District of Columbia Official Code that governs the D.C. Courts system. Based on information provided by the court system, Congressional Budget Office (CBO) estimates that the proposed changes would not have a significant effect on the federal budget. Enacting the legislation would affect direct spending because it would authorize the Court Services and Offender Supervision Agency (CSOSA) to accept and spend monetary gifts. Therefore, pay-as-you-go procedures apply. However, CBO estimates that the net effect on direct spending would be insignificant. Enacting H.R. 4185 would not affect revenues.

Under current law, the budget of the D.C. Courts system, including the Public Defender Service (PDS) and CSOSA, is funded by federal appropriations, and its expenditures are thus recorded in the federal budget. Among other changes, the bill would allow the D.C. Courts System to collect debts and erroneous payments owed by its employees, and to purchase uniforms for non-judicial employees. The bill also would allow CSOSA to operate incentive programs for prisoner education, accept and spend gifts, and receive reimbursement from the D.C. government for the use of office space in D.C. Courts facilities. Finally, the bill would allow the PDS to use unpaid volunteers. Based on information provided by the District of Columbia Courts, the PDS, and CSOSA, CBO estimates that the proposed changes would not have a significant effect on the federal budget.

H.R. 4185 contains no intergovernmental or private-sector mandates as defined in the Unfunded Mandates Reform Act and would impose no costs on state, local, or tribal governments.

== Procedural history ==
The District of Columbia Courts, Public Defender Service, and Court Services and Offender Supervision Agency Act of 2014 was introduced on March 10, 2014, by Del. Eleanor Holmes Norton (D, DC-0). The bill was referred to the United States House Committee on Oversight and Government Reform. The bill was ordered reported on July 3, 2014, alongside House Report 113-514. On July 14, 2014, it was passed by the House in a voice vote.

== Debate and discussion ==
According to the House Committee report on this bill, its purpose is to "provide increased flexibility for these three District entities, and will help them operate more efficiently and effectively."

Bill sponsor Eleanor Holmes Norton argued that the bill "will help make our local justice process more efficient and, therefore, more effective for the residents of the District."

== See also ==
- List of bills in the 113th United States Congress
- Public defender
- Government of Washington, D.C.
