= Antoinette Kavanaugh =

Antoinette Kavanaugh is a Forensic Clinical Psychologist based in Chicago, Illinois. She has been working as a forensic psychologist for over twenty years with specialized training within the fields of forensic psychology and law and research-evaluation methods.

== Education ==
Kavanaugh completed her undergraduate studies at Bowdoin College(1986-1990) where she earned a Bachelor of Arts in Psychology. In 1991, she enrolled in a doctorate program at Northwestern University Medical school, an APA-accredited program to complete the Clinical Psychology Program. Following the completion of her Ph.D., Kavanaugh would start a postdoctoral fellowship in the Forensic Psychology, Law, and Psychiatry program at the University of Massachusetts Medical Center (1997-1998).This fellowship offered comprehensive training in forensic clinical evaluations of both juveniles and adults, mental health case law, and practical applications of forensic theory.

== Career ==
In 2014, Kavanaugh became board certified by the American Board of Professional Psychology (ABPP in the specialty area of forensic psychology). She spent eleven years (1998-2009) as a Clinical Director in the Juvenile Justice Division for the Cook County Juvenile Court Clinic in Chicago, Illinois. During her time at Cook County Juvenile Court Clinic, she responded to court-ordered clinical evaluation requests, developing evaluation protocols, providing technical assistance to local jurisdictions that are interested in adopting her clinic's well respected model.

Her areas of specialization include:

- False Confessions
- Waive of Miranda Rights
- Fitness to Stand Trial
- Insanity and Diminished Capacity
- Emotional Damages
- Interrogative Suggestibility
- Capital Litigation
- Preparing Witnesses

=== Professional affiliations ===
She has served in the American Psychological Association's Committee on Legal Issues (COLI) and the executive committee of the American Psychology-Law Society (AP-LS), which is Division 41 of the APA. She also served as a chair for the Forensic Subcommittee of the Illinois Psychological Association. She currently is vice-chair at The Gault Center.

Her professional affiliations include: Illinois Psychological Association, Institute for Women in Psychology, and the American Psychological Association.

=== Research ===
Kavanaugh has been able to have twelve publications thus far in her career. Her research includes child welfare, criminal justice, juvenile justice agencies and reviewing research articles. Some of her recent reviews are: "Combined Effect of Peer Presence, Social Cues, And Rewards On Cognitive Control In Adolescents" (Breiner et al., 2018) and Reid Training: Does It Impact What Happens In The Interrogation Room?" a review on Police Training in Interviewing and Interrogation Methods: a Comparison of Techniques Used With Adult and Juvenile Suspects" (Cleary & Warner, 2015)

Some of her well known publications include "Evaluations for Sentencing of Juveniles in Criminal Court (Best Practices in Forensic Mental Health Assessments), which was published July, 2020 and Evaluations for Sentencing Juveniles in Criminal Court which was written in collaboration with Thomas Grisso published by the Oxford Press.
