= Elayne Rapping =

American critic and analyst (1938–2016)

Elayne Antler Rapping (December 24, 1938 – June 7, 2016) was an American critic and analyst of popular culture and social issues. She authored several books covering topics such as media theory, popular culture, women's issues, and the portrayal of the legal system on television. As a regular contributor to such publications as The Nation, The Progressive, and The New York Times, she wrote on a wide variety of cultural issues including film and movie reviews.

== Early life and education ==
Born in Chicago, she began studying at the University of Chicago, where she met and married a professor, Leonard A. Rapping. She earned a bachelor's degree at the University of California, Los Angeles, then moved to Pittsburgh when her husband took a position at Carnegie Mellon University. She insisted on taking courses at the University of Pittsburgh and earned her master's degree and doctoral degrees in English.

== Career ==
In 1967, she received the Andrew Mellon Fellowship. Rapping had two children, Jonathan and Alison. As an educator, Rapping was a professor of English and director of women's studies at Robert Morris College from 1970 to 1990, professor of communications at Adelphi University from 1991 to 1998, and professor of American studies at State University of New York at Buffalo until 2009. Rapping was the author of several books which address a range of topics from popular culture, television and society, gender issues, to media theory.

Her first book, The Looking Glass World of Nonfiction TV, was published in 1987. A collection of her essays and articles, Media-tions: Forays into the Culture and Gender Wars, was published in 1994, in which she took up such pop culture artifacts as soap operas, Madonna and Amy Fisher to set forth a new paradigm of feminism's interface with the media.

In 1996, Rapping published The Culture of Recovery: Making Sense of the Self-help Movement in Women's Lives, a book based on her personal investigations into the self-help groups for women. Her 2003 book, Law and Justice As Seen On TV, examines the significance and political impact of law-related television programming beginning with courtroom dramas in the 1940s up to the crime shows of the present. In his review of Law and Justice, educator Austin Sarat stated that Rappings's work "shows how valuable the analysis of popular culture can be in illuminating some of the most important legal and social issues of our time."

Rapping wrote extensively for a number of national publications including The Nation, The Village Voice, Cineaste, Jump Cut, and The Progressive, where she was a regular columnist for many years.

== Death ==
Elayne Rapping died in Atlanta, Georgia of breast cancer on June 7, 2016, aged 77.

== Books ==
- (1976) Processed Ideas and Packaged Dreams: The Manufacturing and Marketing of American Reality
- (1987) The Looking Glass World of Non-Fiction Television (ISBN 0-89608-282-2)
- (1992) The Movie of the Week: Private Stories, Public Events (ISBN 0-8166-2017-2)
- (1993) Gender and Media Theory: A Critique of the Backlash Model
- (1994) Media-tions: Forays into the Culture and Gender Wars (ISBN 0-89608-478-7)
- (1997) The Culture of Recovery: Making Sense of the Self-help Movement in Women's Lives (ISBN 0-8070-2717-0)
- (2003) Law and Justice as Seen on TV (ISBN 0-8147-7560-8)

== Articles ==
- "Unfree Women: Feminism in Doris Lessing's Fiction," Women's Studies, vol. 3, no. 1 (1975), p. 29-44.
- "Tupperware and Women," Radical America, vol. 14, no.6 (November–December, 1980), p. 39-50.
- "The View from Hollywood: The American Family and the American Dream," Socialist Review, vol. 13, no. 1 (January–February, 1983), p. 71-92.
- "The Magic World of Nonfiction TV," Monthly Review, vol. 35, no. 7 (December 1983), p. 71-92.
- "Under Fire" By Elayne Rapping and Robert Simon. Jump Cut no. 30 (March 1985), p. 70
- "Twice in a Lifetime: Consuming Families" Jump Cut no. 31, (March 1986), p. 3-4
- "Alice Doesn't Live Here Anymore," Media and Values (Summer 1987), p. 10-13.
- "Art and the U.S. Left," Monthly Review, vol.39, no. 1, (January 1987), p. 29-38.
- "Twice in a Lifetime," Jump Cut, no. 33 (1987) p. 2-4.
- "Hollywood's Youth Cult Films," Cineaste, vol. 16, no. 1-2 (1987–88) p. 14-28.
- "From Print to Film: The Filming of Joyce Carol Oates' 'Smooth Talk'," Cineaste, vol.15, no.1 (1987), p. 12-14.
- "Wall Street and Hollywood's Classic Tradition," Cineaste, vol.16, no. 3, (1988) p. 15-16.
- "Max Headroom: V-v-very Bigtime TV," Socialist Review, no.96 (1988), p. 31-45.
- "Liberation in Chains: The Woman Question in Hollywood," Cineaste, vol.17, no.1 (1989), p. 4-12.
- "The Future of Motherhood." In: Class and the Feminist Imagination, edited by Ilene Philipson and Karen Hansen, Temple University Press, (Fall 1989), p. 339-427.
- "Hooked on a Feeling: The Sociology of Self-Help" Nation, (November 1989).
- "Gender and Media Theory: A Critique of the Backlash Model," Journal of Social Philosophy, (Summer 1994), p. 7-22.
- "Karal Ann Marling's As Seen on TV," Journal of Communication, (Summer 1995), p. 211-215.
- "The Jane Austen Thing" The Progressive (July 1996), p. 37.
- "The Movie of the Week: Law, Narrativity, and Gender on Prime Time." In: Feminism, Media, and the Law, edited by Martha Fineman and Martha McCluskey. Oxford University Press US (1997) (ISBN 0-19-509629-0)
- "Ellen Comes Out: Media Events as Political Happenings," Z Magazine, (July–August, 1997).
- "Television and the Rise of the Victims’ Rights Movement," New York Law Review, (Summer 1999).
- "Textual Travel and Translation and an Age of Globalized Media," Journal of Social Philosophy, (Fall 1999).
- "Gender, Melrose Place and the Aaron Spelling Legacy." In: Mediated Women, edited by Marian Meyers. Hampton Press (1999).
- "What the Men Don't Know: Secrets of the Daytime Gender Ghetto." In: The Pleasures of Television, edited by Stanley Aronowitz and Patricia Clough. Minnesota UP. (1999).
- "Justice and Ideology on Prime Time TV," Studies in Law, Politics and Society, vol. 21, (2001)
- "Daytime Talk Shows and the Gendered Public Sphere." In: Women's Politics and Communication, edited by Liesbet van Zoonen and Annabelle Sreberny-Mohammadi. Hampton Press, (2001).
- "Aliens, Nomads, Mad Dogs and Road Warriors: The New Face of Criminal Violence on Tabloid TV." In: Mythologies of Violence in Postmodern Media, edited by Christopher Sharrett, Wayne State University Press, (2002).
- "Daytime Utopias: If You Lived in Pine Valley, You'd Be Home." In: Hop on Pop: The Politics and Pleasures of Popular Culture, edited by Henry Jenkins, Tara McPherson and Jane Shattuc. Duke University Press (2002) p. 47 (ISBN 0-8223-2737-6)
- "The Changing Face of Criminal Violence on Television." In: Reality TV: Remaking Television Culture, edited by Laurie Ouelette and Susan Murray, NYU Press. (2005).
- "Feminism and Daytime Soap Operas." In: Mediated Women, 2nd ed., ed Marian Meyers, Hampton Press. (2007)
- "The Magical World of Daytime Soap Operas." In: The Media/Cultural Studies Reader, edited by Douglas Kellner and Rhonda Hammer, Peter Lang Press (2009).
- "Media, Law and Celebrity," St. Louis Journalism Review, (Winter 2009).
- "Room For Debate: Do We Need Network TV?" New York Times, (February 27, 2009).
- "Room For Debate: What Does Broadcast News Do Right?" New York Times, (November 9, 2009).
- "TV Lawyers through History." In: Lawyers on Television: The Good, the Bad and the Ugly, edited by Michael Asimov, forthcoming, ABA Press (2009).
- "Room For Debate: When Hollywood Says 'Enough'." New York Times, (February 25, 2011).
- "Is It Harder To Be A Celebrity Now?" New York Times, (March 23, 2011).

== Television and video ==
- Swoons to Romance Novels, Paper Tiger Television 1983
- "Elayne Rapping Reads Soap Operas" As part of the Paper Tiger Television series: "Smashing the Myths of the Mass Media," 1985.
