= Randolph Blackwell =

American activist (1927–1981)

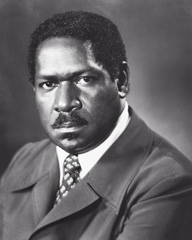
- Randolph Blackwell - Former Director (1977 – 1979) of the Minority Business Development Agency.
- Born: March 10, 1927; Greensboro, North Carolina
- Died: May 21, 1981 (aged 54)
- Occupation: Director of the Office of Minority Business Enterprise
- Known for: Veteran of the Civil Rights Movement
- Spouse: Elizabeth Knox Blackwell
- Children: 1

Randolph T. Blackwell (March 10, 1927 – May 21, 1981) was an American activist of the Civil Rights Movement, serving in Martin Luther King Jr.'s Southern Christian Leadership Conference, amongst other organizations. Coretta Scott King described him as an "unsung giant" of nonviolent social change.

In the late 1920s and early 1930s, Blackwell's father was active in Marcus Garvey's United Negro Improvement Association; Randolph attended association meetings with his father, and visited the prison where Garvey was held. In 1943, inspired by hearing Ella Baker speak, he founded a youth chapter of the NAACP in Greensboro. As a student in sociology at North Carolina A & T University (from which he graduated in 1949) he made an unsuccessful run for the state assembly. He earned a law degree from Howard University in 1953, took an assistant professorship at Winston-Salem Teacher's College and then became an associate professor in 1954 at Alabama A & M College, where he taught government.

While at Alabama A & M, Blackwell became a leader of the 1962 student sit-ins in nearby Huntsville, Alabama. He left academia in 1963 and became a field director in the Voter Education Project, an organization that promoted voter registration among blacks in the South. In March 1963, while attempting to register black voters in Greenwood, Mississippi with Bob Moses and Jimmy Travis of the Student Nonviolent Coordinating Committee, the car they were driving was fired on. Blackwell and Moses escaped injury but Travis was shot and hospitalized; the shooting brought national media attention to the struggle in the south, energized the civil rights movement, and forced the Kennedy administration to investigate. Blackwell became the program director of the Southern Christian Leadership Conference in 1964, but after a disagreement with Hosea Williams, he left the organization in 1966 and became the director of Southern Rural Action, an anti-poverty organization in the Deep South.

From 1977 to 1979, in the presidency of Jimmy Carter, Blackwell was director of the Office of Minority Business Enterprise in the U.S. Department of Commerce, but was beset there by charges of mismanagement.

In 1976, the King Center for Nonviolent Social Change gave him its Martin Luther King Jr. Nonviolent Peace Prize, and in 1978 the National Bar Association gave him their Equal Justice Award.
