= Gideon's Promise =

American nonprofit organization

- Formation: 2007
- Type: Nonprofit
- Purpose: Criminal defense organization
- Location: Atlanta, Georgia, United States
- Official language: English
- Website: gideonspromise.org
- Formerly called: Southern Public Defender Training Center

Gideon's Promise, named after the landmark case Gideon v. Wainright and formerly the Southern Public Defender Training Center, is a non-profit organization founded in 2007 with a fellowship from George Soros’ Open Society Foundations.

The organization is based in Atlanta, Georgia, and provides ongoing continuing education programs for law school students, new public defenders, senior public defenders, law school clinicians and chief public defenders. The organization partners with public defender offices around the country to implement best practices in public defense. In the fall of 2014, president and founder Jonathan Rapping partnered with the state of Maryland in an attempt to improve statewide public defense. Rapping was honored in 2014 as a MacArthur Fellow for his work with Gideon's Promise.
