= In re Kenneth Humphrey =

- Supreme Court of California
- Full case name: IN RE: KENNETH HUMPHREY, on Habeas Corpus.

Holding
- Undecided at Supreme Court. The Court of Appeal, First District, Division 2, California, held that setting money bail in an amount a defendant cannot possibly afford amounts to unconstitutional detention of a person before they have been convicted of a crime.

In re Kenneth Humphrey was a case decided by the California Supreme Court concerning whether it is a violation of due process and equal protection to imprison defendants prior to trial solely because they cannot afford to pay bail.

On March 25, 2021, the California Supreme Court affirmed the ruling by the District Court of Appeal in severely restricting the use of "cash bail" on defendants who could not afford it.

According to the Harvard Law Review (HLR), the decision provided "a significant substantive protection for indigent persons who might otherwise be jailed" due to their inability to pay their bail. Nevertheless, the HLR notes that the "court's decision left unresolved core questions about the role of public safety in" the state bail system, potentially limiting the ruling's impact on reducing "hardships posed by bail and pretrial detention".

== Background ==
In May 2017, Kenneth Humphrey was held in jail because he was unable to pay the $350,000 bail set after his arrest for allegedly robbing and threatening his neighbor.

At the time of Humphrey's arrest, California’s bail system enabled judges to set bail such that it would be unaffordable to the defendant, without a finding that the defendant would pose a threat to society. Bail reform advocates in California criticized this practice, arguing that it did not promote public safety and unfairly incarcerated the poor, while releasing wealthier defendants with similar charges.

Mr. Humphrey, represented by Paul Myslin and Chesa Boudin at the San Francisco Public Defender's Office as well as Alec Karakatsanis of Civil Rights Corps, appealed the bail determination and argued that it was unconstitutional for judges to set a bail amount without considering the defendant’s ability to pay or non-monetary alternatives.

== First District Court of Appeal Ruling ==
In January 2018, California’s First District Court of Appeal ruled in favor of Mr. Humphrey, holding that California’s money bail system violated due process and equal protection. The ruling required trial court judges to consider a defendant’s ability to pay as well as non-monetary options for release when determining a bail amount or setting conditions of release.

The opinion was authored by Presiding Judge Anthony Kline, joined by Judges Therese M. Stewart and Marla J. Miller. Following this order, Mr. Humphrey was released from jail in May 2018. Later that month the California Supreme Court agreed to review the case.

== California Supreme Court ==
On August 26, 2020, the Supreme Court granted precedential effect to Part III of the Humphrey appellate opinion, likely signaling the court's perspective on the issues of setting bail amounts based on a defendant's ability to pay, and the availability of non-monetary alternatives to bail. The date for oral arguments in the case has been delayed twice, first from December 2019 to February 2020, and then again to January 5, 2021.

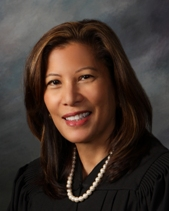
Tani Cantil-Sakauye, then serving as Chief Justice of California

During the pendency of the case, the Supreme Court requested briefing on the impact of Senate Bill 10 (Hertzberg, Stats. 2018, ch. 244), which abolished cash bail in favor of a risk-based pre-trial detention system. However, the American Bail Coalition, an industry association of bail bondsmen, funded a signature gathering effort for Proposition 25, a referendum on the November 2020 ballot to determine whether Senate Bill 10 should be approved by the electorate. Proposition 25 failed and Senate Bill 10 was rejected.

The court recently decided a related case, In re White, in which they held that, given that cash bail exists, a court may deny bail based on the assessment that the defendant will present a substantial threat to the community if released. A concurrence by Associate Justice Leondra Kruger, joined by Associate Justice Goodwin Liu, noted that White was moot, because the defendant pled guilty before the Supreme Court could decide on his case.

However the majority opinion (penned by Associate Justice Mariano-Florentino Cuéllar, joined by Chief Justice Tani Cantil-Sakauye and Associate Justices Ming Chin, Carol Corrigan, and Joshua Groban) used the present case to offer guidance to future courts. Similar logic could still lead the court to publish an opinion on the substance of Humphrey.

=== Decision ===
On March 25, 2021, the California Supreme Court affirmed the District Court of Appeal in severely restricting the use of "cash bail" on defendants who could not afford it. Defendants can still be detained based on articulable facts of: 1) their threat of danger to the community; 2) and risk of flight.
