= Cynthia E. Jones =

American attorney and academic

Cynthia Ellen Jones
- Citizenship: American
- Occupation: Professor of law
- Board member of: The Sentencing Project, president; Civil Rights Corps
- Awards: American Bar Association Meritorious Service Award (2011)

Academic background
- Education: University of Delaware (B.A.); Washington College of Law (J.D.)

Academic work
- Discipline: Legal scholar
- Institutions: American University Washington College of Law
- Main interests: criminal procedure, criminal law, racial justice, bail reform

Cynthia Ellen Jones is a criminal defense attorney and professor of law at the American University Washington College of Law specializing in criminal law and procedure as well as bail reform. Jones is an expert in racial disparities in the pretrial system and was previously the Director of the Public Defenders Service in Washington, D.C. She is a leading scholar in criminal procedure. In 2011, she was awarded the American University Faculty Award for Outstanding Teaching. Jones was the director of the Stephen S. Weinstein Trial Advocacy Program at the university. She has written three textbooks related to criminal law and procedure.

== Early life and education ==
Jones attended the University of Delaware, graduating with a Bachelor of Arts in 1986. She later attended Washington College of Law, graduating magna cum laude with a juris doctor in 1989.

== Career ==
After graduating law school, Jones worked as a law clerk for Hon. Frank E. Schwelb at the District of Columbia Court of Appeals from 1989 to 1990. Later, she worked as an associate at Dickstein, Shapiro and Morin. She was admitted to both the Pennsylvania Bar and the District of Columbia Bar, but she is not active in either. She worked as a public defender and was the executive director of the Public Defender Service and the deputy director of the D.C. Pretrial Services Agency. In 2001, Jones received the African Americans and the Law North Star Award. In 2018, she was awarded the University of Delaware College of Arts and Sciences Alumni Award.

Jones often speaks at events and has spoken at several notable events, including "The White House presents: A Cycle of Incarceration: Prison, Debt, and Bail Practices" and the Washington State Supreme Court Minority & Justice Commission symposium on "Pre-Trial Justice: Reducing the Rate of Incarceration". In 2008, she moderated a panel hosted by the American Constitution Society for Law and Policy regarding the role of judges in plea bargains. She also spoke on the American Constitution Society's 2014-2015 Supreme Court Review Panel.

Much of Jones' career has been focused on advocating for bail reform. She claims that bail systems increase racial and economic disparities. She also works with the Pretrial Racial Justice Initiative.

Jones teaches at the American University Washington College of Law. She received the American University Faculty Award for Outstanding Teaching in 2011 and the Teaching with Technology Award from the American University Center for Teaching Excellence. The university has also named a scholarship after her, the Professor Cynthia E. Jones Scholarship, which is awarded to an aspiring public defender.

In addition to her work as a professor, Jones is president of the board of directors of The Sentencing Project. She also sits on the board of the Civil Rights Corps.

== Publications ==
=== Books ===
- Henning, Taslitz, Paris, Jones, Podgor, Mastering Criminal Procedure I — The Investigative Stage, Carolina Academic Press (2nd edition 2014)
- Henning, Taslitz, Paris, Jones, Podgor, Mastering Criminal Procedure II — The Adjudicatory Stage, Carolina Academic Press (2nd edition 2014)
- Podgor, Henning, Garcia, and Jones, Criminal Law, Concepts and Practice (4th edition) Carolina Academic Press (2017)

=== Articles ===
- "Evidence Destroyed, Innocence Lost: The Duty to Preserve Evidence Under Innocence Protection Statutes", 42 Am. Crim. L. Rev. 1292 (2005)
- "The Right Remedy for the Wrongly Convicted: Judicial Sanctions for the Destruction of DNA Evidence", 77 Fordham L. Rev. 2893 (2009)
- "A Reason to Doubt: The Suppression of Evidence and the Inference of Innocence", 100 J. Crim. L & Criminology 415 (2010)
- "Confronting Race in the Criminal Justice System: The ABA Racial Justice Improvement Project", 27 Criminal Justice 12 (2012)
- "Give Us Free": Addressing Racial Disparities in Bail Determinations", 16 N.Y.U. J. Legis. & Pub. Pol'y 919 (2013)
- "I AM Ronald Cotton": Teaching Wrongful Convictions in a Criminal Law Class", 10 Ohio State J. Crim. L. 607 (2013)
- "The Biological Evidence Preservation Handbook: Best Practices for Evidence Handlers", National Institute of Standards and Technology, Technical Working Group (April 2013)
- "Disproportionate Pretrial Detention of Blacks and Latinos Drives Mass Incarceration" (co-author Nancy Gist), Huffington Post (2015)
- "Here Comes the Judge: A Model for Judicial Oversight and Regulation of the Brady Disclosure Duty", 46 Hofstra L. Rev 87 (2017)
- "Accused and Unconvicted: Fleeing from Wealth-Based Pretrial Detention", 82 Alb. L. Rev. 1063 (2019)

== Filmography ==
- 2010: Fighting Evidence with Evidence (writer and producer)
- 2016: BAIL in America: The Color of Pretrial Detention (executive producer)
