= Usual Cruelty =

2019 book on American legal system

- First edition
- Author: Alec Karakatsanis
- Genre: Law
- Publisher: The New Press
- Publication date: 2019

Usual Cruelty: The Complicity of Lawyers in the Criminal Injustice System (2019) is a non-fiction law book by civil rights lawyer Alec Karakatsanis. The book concerns injustice and inequality in the American legal system.

== Summary ==
After a brief introduction, the book is broken into three essays with citations and footnotes, written over the course of Karakatsanis' career.

=== The Punishment Bureaucracy ===
The first essay is "The Punishment Bureaucracy: How to Think About "Criminal Justice Reform"". It was published in the Yale Law Journal in 2019. In it, Karakatsanis describes perceived injustices of the American criminal system. These include cash bail, unequal treatment under the law, and a lack of rigorous evidence. He calls the criminal system "the punishment bureaucracy".

Although the system individually requires "beyond a reasonable doubt" before someone may be convicted, in aggregate, the system does not require this for its punishments. Karakatsanis argues there is no evidence that criminalizing drug use "address[es] any social ill whatsoever".

Karakatsanis argues that the outcomes the criminal system creates are the result of choices made by politicians, prosecutors, police, and "elites". He cites several examples that were or were not prosecuted, including waterboarding, the NSA's wiretapping program, Tim DeChristopher's non-serious bid on a federal land auction, the Killing of Eric Garner, and the prosecution of Ramsey Orta following the killing.

Karakatsanis cautions against reform that does not substantially shrink the criminal system's budget and influence. He recommends working with "deeper politics" rather than the "silo" of reforming prosecutors or prisons. Among others, he approves of programs that build power and employment for formerly incarcerated people, reparations for those harmed by punishment, and reducing the number of operational jails (thus reducing the number of people in prison).

=== The Human Lawyer ===
The second essay describes a fictional "human lawyer" who remembers the human beings affected by her career choices.

=== Policing, Mass Imprisonment, and the Failure of American Lawyers ===
The third essay argues that lawyers should dedicate their time to causes that match the values of the profession.

== Reception ==
The book was favorably reviewed by Bernice B. Donald in Law360. A former prosecutor in Slate agreed with the book. Karakatsanis was interviewed by National Public Radio. An excerpt of the introduction, focusing on cash bail, was published in Time.
