= CPOA =

CPOA may refer to:

- California Peace Officers' Association
- Chief Petty Officer Academy
