= 2019 New York bail reform =

State law reforming bail rules in New York, United States

The U.S. state of New York enacted bail reform, in an act that stood from January to June 2020. As part of the New York State Fiscal Year (SFY) Budget for 2019–2020, passed on April 1, 2019, cash bail was eliminated for most charges classified as misdemeanors or non-violent felonies. The law went into effect on January 1, 2020. It has been amended several times since then.

According to The New York Times, "While New Jersey, California, Illinois and other states have limited the use of bail, New York is one of the few states to abolish bail for many crimes without also giving state judges the discretion to consider whether a person poses a threat to public safety in deciding whether to hold them."

The reform was the subject of considerable public debate, and was opposed by several lawmakers, district attorneys, and police chiefs before its implementation. In the following years judges were given more discretion.

== Implementation ==
New York state judges reportedly started releasing criminal suspects in November 2019 due to the impending law implementation. It was estimated that 25,000 people would be released by the time the law took effect. In the first full year after implementation of the law, there were approximately 100,000 cases where adults were released instead of being held in custody or assigned bail. In one-fifth of those cases a released individual sustained a new arrest while the initial case was pending, most of which were for misdemeanors and nonviolent felonies. Individuals who were rearrested on violent felony charges accounted for nearly four percent of those 100,000 cases, and fewer than one-half of one percent of those released were arrested again for violent felony charges with a firearm.

The law has undergone several changes since implementation. In January 2020, Governor Andrew Cuomo signed legislation allowing judges to impose cash bail for more crimes and under more conditions (such as the defendant being on parole). Several changes to the law since then have given judges further discretion to set bail in some circumstances.

== Impact ==
A 2022 paper by researchers at University at Albany, SUNY examining the rise in crime in New York found that "the effect of bail reform on crime rate increases is negligible".

A June 2023 study from the Data Collaborative for Justice found that the bail reform reduced re-arrest rates after implementation. A follow-up study using a different methodology did not find any large impact in re-arrest rates in either direction.

A July 2020 analysis by the New York Post of NYPD data found that out of 11,000 people released from Rikers Island under the reform, only 31 (0.28%) were later suspected of a gun crime and only 1 person was charged.

== Reception ==
The reform is part of the larger movement to reform Bail in the United States. It was supported by the New York Civil Liberties Union, arguing that "a person’s wealth should not determine their liberty".

Several prosecutors and law enforcement officials criticized the law for taking away critical decision-making from judges, who no longer have "the discretion to set a higher bail for people with long arrest records" or have shown "other signs they might commit another crime." They also expressed concern that "some defendants released under the new rules will continue to commit crimes, and a few may try to intimidate potential witnesses."

Additional criticism came from communities impacted by a spate of antisemitic attacks in Brooklyn. One assailant, Tiffany Harris, was released without bail after attacking three Jewish women, and attacked another woman the next day. This and other attacks led some members of the local community to oppose the reforms.
