= Alec Karakatsanis =

American civil rights lawyer

- Born: November 7, 1983 (age 43); Pittsburgh, Pennsylvania, U.S.
- Education: Yale University (BA); Harvard University (JD)
- Website: Official website

Alec Karakatsanis (born November 7, 1983) is an American civil rights lawyer and author. He is the founder of Civil Rights Corps, a non-profit organization founded in 2016 that files civil rights lawsuits in the U.S. legal system. Karakatsanis' legal work has targeted, among other things, the American money bail system. He has written and spoken extensively about police and prison abolition and the negative impacts of copaganda, propaganda efforts to improve public perception about police and law enforcement. In 2016, Karakatsanis was awarded the Stephen B. Bright Award by Gideon's Promise and the Trial Lawyer of the Year Award by Public Justice. He has published several books including Usual Cruelty and Copaganda: How Police and the Media Manipulate Our News.

== Early life and education ==
Alec Karakatsanis was raised in Pittsburgh, Pennsylvania. He graduated from Yale University in 2005 with a degree in Ethics, Politics, & Economics. His exposure to critical social theory studies at Yale influenced his perspective on society. He enrolled at Harvard Law School in 2005, initially intending to focus on school desegregation and education policy. During his first year, volunteer work with Harvard Defenders shifted his focus to indigent criminal defense. He participated in the Criminal Justice Institute Clinic at Harvard. He was appointed the Supreme Court Chair of the Harvard Law Review. He earned his Doctor of Law from Harvard Law School in 2008.

== Legal career ==
After completing law school, Karakatsanis served as a judicial law clerk for United States District Judge Myron H. Thompson judge in the United States District Court for the Middle District of Alabama in Montgomery, Alabama. After the clerkship, he worked as an assistant Federal public defender in Alabama. He also practiced law at the Public Defender Service for the District of Columbia.

=== Equal Justice Under Law ===
Utilizing a seed grant from Harvard Law School's Public Service Venture Fund, Karakatsanis co-founded the legal nonprofit Equal Justice Under Law (EJUL) with law school classmate Phil Telfeyan in early 2014. The organization was operated frugally, with its founders minimizing expenses by staying with friends, sleeping on couches and floors, and preparing inexpensive meals.

=== Civil Rights Corps ===
Karakatsanis founded the legal nonprofit Civil Rights Corps in 2016 after leaving EJUL. He leads Civil Rights Corps, which is based in Washington, D.C., working on litigation related to prosecutorial misconduct, indigent defense and immigration enforcement.

== Litigation ==
He and his team have filed lawsuits targeting the use of money bail and other practices resulting in the pretrial detention of individuals unable to pay. He has expressed concern about the enforceability of settlements, noting that governments sometimes failed to follow through on agreed reforms, necessitating ongoing legal oversight and, at times, renewed litigation.

=== Fines and fees ===
Karakatsanis began investigating local courts in Alabama, observing cases in which individuals were jailed solely for unpaid fines and fees. He met Sharnalle Mitchell and Lorenzo Brown, both jailed for unpaid traffic tickets, and filed a federal lawsuit on their behalf. The city of Montgomery subsequently released all individuals held in similar circumstances and redesigned its municipal court system. Karakatsanis collaborated with the Southern Poverty Law Center on the settlement.

In July 2016, Civil Rights Corps and ArchCity Defenders received a settlement when the city of Jennings, Missouri agreed to pay $4.7 million to 2,000 people incarcerated in its jail for inability to pay traffic tickets and other minor fees.

=== Pre-trial imprisonment ===
In 2014 and 2015, Karakatsanis and his colleagues brought multiple class-action lawsuits against municipal courts across the United States, challenging wealth-based detention practices. These lawsuits led to policy changes in five cities and gained support from the federal Justice Department, which filed statements of interest supporting the position that fixed-amount bail schemes without consideration of indigence violated the Fourteenth Amendment. In January 2015, Karakatsanis filed a lawsuit on behalf of Christy Dawn Varden in Clanton, Alabama, challenging the city's bail policies, which required defendants to pay a fixed amount for release regardless of their financial situation. The suit argued that such policies discriminated against poor defendants by detaining them while wealthier individuals could pay for release. Clanton responded by agreeing to release most misdemeanor defendants without bail and to allow defendants to see a judge within 48 hours. Two months after her release she died from a drug overdose.

Karakatsanis then filed similar lawsuits in six additional jurisdictions across four states, representing individuals who remained jailed solely due to their inability to pay bail. The legal strategy centered on the Equal Protection Clause, contending that it was unconstitutional to detain people because they could not pay, while others in similar circumstances could go free if they had funds. In May 2016, CRC and partners filed a federal lawsuit against Harris County, Texas, regarding the jailing of misdemeanor defendants unable to pay bail. In April 2017, a federal judge granted a preliminary injunction halting the county's practices, resulting in the release of individuals charged with misdemeanors.

== Writings and commentary ==
Numerous U.S. media outlets have featured Karakatsanis' work, including The New Yorker, The Huffington Post, The Washington Post, The Marshall Project, and The New York Times. He has appeared on various podcasts.

He has provided commentary on the consequences of private prisons.

His book Usual Cruelty consists of three essays. He argues that lawyers have become blinded and thus complicit in the usual cruelty of the American criminal legal system. He writes: "The legal profession and the doctrines that it produces exhibit a willful blindness to the extent of the physical and psychological punishments that we perpetrate." One review provided commentary on his use of wordsmithing to provide commentary on the criminal legal system.

In 2025, he published a book titled "Copaganda: How Police and the Media Manipulate Our News." He believe the mainstream news media perpetuates fear of crime and a hero mythology around police. He refers to a "punishment bureaucracy" in the United States. He believes that the bureaucracy is a system that devotes an enormous amount of resources to policing certain laws when certain people break them, but overlooks that common offenses of the wealthy, like wage theft and corporate crimes.

== Selected publications ==
=== Books ===
- Copaganda: How Police and the Media Manipulate Our News. The New Press. April 15, 2025. ISBN 978-1-62097-853-5.
- Usual Cruelty: The Complicity of Lawyers in the Criminal Injustice System. New York: The New Press. 2019. ISBN 978-1-62097-527-5.

=== Law review articles ===
- "The Human Lawyer" (PDF). N.Y.U. Review of Law & Social Change. 34: 563–593. 2010.
- "United States v. Hungerford: Ninth Circuit Affirms Mandatory Sentence" (PDF). Harvard Law Review. 120 (7): 1988–1995. 2007. ISSN 0017-811X.
- "It is time to end poverty jailing." Pub. Admin. Rev. 75 (2015): 791.
- "Policing, Mass Imprisonment, and the Failure of American Lawyers". Harvard Law Review Forum. 128 (6). April 28, 2015.
- Sebastian, Thea L., and Alec Karakatsanis. "CHALLENGING MONEY BAIL IN THE COURTS." Judges' Journal 57.3 (2018).
- "The Punishment Bureaucracy: How to Think About "Criminal Justice Reform." Yale Law Journal Forum. Vol. 128. No. 1. 2019.
- "The Body Camera: The Language of Our Dreams." Yale JL & Liberation 4 (2024): 11-14.

=== News articles ===
- "President Obama's Department of Injustice". The New York Times. August 18, 2015. ISSN 0362-4331.
- "Why US v Blewett is the Obama Justice Department's greatest shame". The Guardian. July 23, 2013. ISSN 0261-3077.
- "Police Departments Spend Vast Sums of Money Creating 'Copaganda'" Jacobin. July 20, 2022

== Awards ==
- 2016: Trial Lawyer of the Year (Public Justice)
- 2016: Stephen B. Bright Award (Gideon's Promise)
- 2016: Emerging Leader Award (Johnson Institute for Responsible Leadership at the University of Pittsburgh)
- 2023: John F. Kennedy New Frontier Award
