= Civil Rights Corps =

Civil rights organization based in Washington D.C

- Founded: 2016
- Founders: Alec Karakatsanis
- Type: 501(c)(3) nonprofit organization
- Tax ID no.: 81-3422012
- Headquarters: Washington, D.C.
- Website: https://civilrightscorps.org/

Civil Rights Corps (CRC) is a Washington, D.C.-based nonprofit organization focused on civil rights work. CRC was founded in 2016 by Alec Karakatsanis. He had previously co-founded Equal Justice Under Law (civil rights organization). In 2017, the organization had ten staff members. At this time, they focused on litigation in two areas: the jailing of people who cannot afford to pay municipal fines and fees and the pre-trial detention of criminal defendants who cannot afford cash bail before trial. CRC has expanded into litigation and advocacy related to police and prosecutorial misconduct, jail conditions, and family separation cases.

== Litigation and advocacy ==
=== Pretrial detention ===
==== California ====
CRC and the San Francisco Public Defender's Office represented Kenneth Humphrey in his case where they argued that his pretrial detention was unlawful. They argued it was unconstitutional to keep him in jail pretrial just because he could not afford to pay the high bail. Their efforts led to the 2021 California Supreme Court ruling, In re Kenneth Humphrey, that held people cannot be detained solely for inability to pay bail and required courts to consider ability to pay and other options. Some legal scholars determined that Humphrey had largely no practical impact on pretrial incarceration.

CRC challenged Los Angeles Superior Court bail schedule in 2022. A superior court judge later found that cash bail was unconstitutional in most instances. In response, changes were made to the pretrial detention system. The executive director of the American Bail Coalition has accused CRC of bringing meritless lawsuits in select venues and damaging the criminal justice system.

In 2024, they litigated the pretrial detention of a man in San Mateo County alleging that it was unconstitutional. At that time, Gerald Kowalczyk alleged that he was unlawfully detained pretrial after being accused of using another person's credit card without authorization to purchase food. He had already pleaded no contest and served time in jail. But the Supreme Court of California still issued a ruling on the issue of his pretrial detention. CRC represented Kowalczyk in earlier proceedings and presented arguments to the California Supreme Court. The Court, reaffirming Humphrey, held that most defendants have a right to pretrial release and that judges cannot set bail amounts that are financially impossible to meet.

In 2025, CRC sued Riverside County, California to end cash bail and alleged dangerous conditions in the jails run by the Riverside County Sheriff's Department. Riverside County Sheriff Chad Bianco criticized the lawsuit.

==== Other states ====
From 2016 to 2018, CRC challenged cash bail practices across Alabama, Illinois, and Texas. In 2016, CRC, working with the Southern Poverty Law Center, challenged the bail practices in municipal courts in Alabama. In response, several cities in Alabama changed their bail practices and reduced the population in the jails. Some other related lawsuits included one in Cullman County, Alabama, and Randolph County, Alabama. CRC filed a lawsuit in Cook County, Illinois alleging that unaffordable cash bail violates the constitution. The chief judge of the Circuit Court of Cook County changed the policy of the Court's bail practices by requiring courts to consider whether "defendant has the present ability to pay the amount [of bail] necessary." In 2017, United States District Judge Lee H. Rosenthal found parts of Harris County, Texas's bail system to be unconstitutional, in a suit that had been brought by CRC and the law firm Susman Godfrey LLP. At the time, lawyers for Harris County argued they were already making changes to the bail system and their bail system complied with the Constitution and Texas criminal procedure laws. Harris County ultimately appealed the decision to the United States Court of Appeals for the Fifth Circuit who affirmed the unconstitutionality of the bail system, but placed limits on the release of defendants who were jailed at that time. CRC, with the ACLU, also challenged Dallas County, Texas's money bail system in 2018.

In 2019 and to the present, CRC continued its bail and pretrial detention litigation in Oregon, North Carolina, Missouri, Pennsylvania, Tennessee, and Maryland. Public defenders worked with CRC to challenge cash bail in Oregon in 2019. Washington County District Attorney Kevin Barton commented on the litigation: "Anytime that we tie what we do in the justice system to money, I think that should make people feel a little bit uncomfortable. I don’t think money should play a determining role in how someone is treated in the justice system." Barton further added that addressing everyone's right to release comes down to resources, which are often limited. They also filed a similar challenge in Alamance County, North Carolina. Also, in 2019, CRC challenged the cash bail system in St. Louis. A spokesman for the Court said the criminal courts follow applicable statutes in setting bail and welcomes federal review. In 2020, CRC represented a public defender who was allegedly fired in retaliation for criticizing the pretrial detention system in Montgomery County, Pennsylvania. That same year, they challenged the pretrial detention policies and related jail conditions in different parts of Tennessee: Hamblen County, Tennessee, and Nashville. In 2022, CRC, WilmerHale, and Georgetown University Law Center's Institute for Constitutional Advocacy and Protection sued Prince George's County, Maryland over their pretrial detention policies and procedures. The Washington Post editorial board wrote an editorial about the lawsuit and the underlying issues. U.S. District Judge Peter J. Messitte denied the plaintiff's request for injunctive relief against PG county. The United States Court of Appeals for the Fourth Circuit reversed the District Court. Messitte again denied the request for an injunction. In 2023, CRC and the Abolitionist Law Center filed a federal suit alleging that Allegheny County, Pennsylvania's use of probation detainers unconstitutionally jailed people without meaningful judicial review. The suit was before Nicholas Ranjan and he denied the request for an injunction. The case ultimately landed in the United States Court of Appeals for the Third Circuit where the ACLU filed an Amicus curiae brief. The Third Circuit found, in part, for the plaintiffs.

=== Court debt and fees ===
CRC has litigated debt collection and fine and fee practices in several states. In 2015, a lawsuit was filed against New Orleans for their debt collection practices. In response, some debt was waived by the courts. Later, the city of New Orleans' debt collection system was found to be unconstitutional by a federal court in 2018, which impacted the court funding system. The United States Court of Appeals for the Fifth Circuit found the system of collecting fines and fees was unconstitutional. In 2018, the CRC joined with the Georgetown Law's Institute for Constitutional Advocacy and Protection in a case against sheriffs in Oklahoma and a private debt collection company that worked on behalf of Oklahoma courts and sheriffs. They alleged that the company caused people to be arrested and jailed for unpaid court debt by requesting failure-to-pay warrants without ability-to-pay hearings. Aberdeen Enterprizes responded that they only collect debt owed and play no role in incarceration. CRC filed a class-action lawsuit challenging Maricopa County's marijuana diversion program and alleged that participants who could not afford program fees were kept in the program longer and subjected to additional drug testing. The litigation later resulted in a settlement. In 2024, Ferguson, Missouri, agreed to pay $4.5 million to settle a class action for unconstitutionally jailing thousands of people who could not pay fines and court costs. The suit was brought by CRC and St. Louis University School of Law Civil Litigation Clinic.

=== Jail conditions and privatization ===
In June 2020, CRC filed a lawsuit on behalf of inmates at the Prince George's County, Maryland jail that alleged unsanitary conditions and inadequate COVID-19 protections and sought the release of vulnerable inmates and to improve public health safety measures. As a part of their advocacy, they created a project called "Gasping for Justice," where celebrities and other people read sworn statements that detailed their experience inside the jail. The lawsuit was settled in 2021. During the COVID pandemic, CRC engaged in similar litigation and advocacy for inmates at the Cook County Jail.

==== Right to Hug project ====
The organization has litigated the "Right 2 Hug Project," challenging the corporations and jail policies that replace in-person family visits at jails with paid phone and video calls. CRC's work led some journalists to investigate who profits from jail phone calls in Kalamazoo, Michigan. In March 2024, CRC, Public Justice and the law firm Pitt McGehee, filed lawsuits in Genesee County and St. Clair County, Michigan, where they alleged a violation of the right to associate under the Michigan Constitution. Law enforcement and jail officials have argued that virtual-only visits are efficient use of resources and reduce the security risk of bringing in outsiders to the jail. In January 2025, the ACLU of Michigan led efforts to file Amicus curiae briefs in the St. Clair County case before the Michigan Court of Appeals. In January 2025, CRC filed a similar suit against Adams County, Colorado, that argued children have a right to hug incarcerated parents under the Colorado Constitution.

=== Police and prosecutorial misconduct ===
CRC has pursued ethics complaints against prosecutors in several jurisdictions. In 2017, CRC and the American Civil Liberties Union (ACLU) sued Orleans Parish District Attorney Leon Cannizzaro over fake subpoenas allegedly used to coerce victims and witnesses into interrogations. Several people in the lawsuit alleged they were jailed or threatened with jail for failing to cooperate. Cannizzaro responded that nobody was jailed or fined with the subpoenas. In 2020, an issue was pending before the United States Court of Appeals for the Fifth Circuit over whether the employees for the DA's office had absolute immunity over the use of the fabricated subpoenas. The panel on the Fifth Circuit rejected the DA's appeal, but they left open the possibility for immunity. In New York, CRC joined law professors and community groups to file grievances against prosecutors in Queens, New York who had judicial findings of misconduct but had not been publicly disciplined. This project included the publication of website. Lawyers for the city claimed that the professors had abused New York's grievance procedure. Civil Rights Corps, joining with others, filed a lawsuit in defense of law professors who’ve been threatened for filing the complaints. In 2022, District Judge Victor Marrero ruled that the professors are free publish their complaints online. In 2023, they brought an ethics complaint against Allegheny County District Attorney Stephen Zappala alleging political influence in charging decisions. The organization assisted a Nevada County, California public defender in identifying prosecution legal writing errors and filing a complaint with the California Supreme Court in 2025 regarding the alleged use of Generative AI in legal briefs filed by prosecutors that sought pretrial detention. The prosecution in that case acknowledges errors in the briefs, but denied the widespread use of AI.

CRC filed a federal civil rights lawsuit against three Pasadena, Texas police officers for allegedly fabricating evidence to wrongfully arrest and prosecute him for DWI. They represented a man in a federal lawsuit against three Harris County constable deputies after they conducted a warrantless no-knock entry into the wrong home in 2022, woke the couple at gunpoint, and held them despite initially doubting whether they had the correct address. The United States Court of Appeals for the Fifth Circuit rejected the deputies request for qualified immunity on the unlawful entry claim but rejected the excessive force claim.

=== Family separation ===
CRC has worked on child welfare issues in several states, including courtroom closures, safe haven laws, and secrecy laws. They have investigated the child welfare system in Durham County since 2023. In 2024, they filed lawsuits against government and judicial officials in Durham County, North Carolina over the closure of courtrooms where family separation may occur. In 2025, CRC co-authored amicus briefs in support of a finding of neglect against a mother who used Maryland's Safe Haven law. CRC provided written testimony to the Maryland Legislature in support of legislation that would require parental notification before an Child protective services investigation begins. In 2026, CRC filed a lawsuit arguing that Mississippi's strict child protective services court secrecy laws are unconstitutional because they prevent lawyers from accessing key records and allege that this results in the unnecessary detention of children and the separation of families.

== Notable attorneys ==
- Kiah Duggins worked as an attorney for CRC. Her work focused on challenging policing and bail practices in Tennessee, Texas and Washington, D.C. She died in the 2025 Potomac River mid-air collision.

== Awards and recognition ==
- CRC with the San Francisco Public Defender's Office received the Champion of Public Defense Award (2019) from the National Association of Criminal Defense Lawyers for their work on In re Kenneth Humphrey.
