= SAFE-T Act =

2021 Illinois statute

101st Illinois General Assembly
- Citation: Public Act 101-0652
- Passed: January 13, 2021
- Signed by: Governor J. B. Pritzker
- Signed: February 22, 2021
- Bill citation: HB 3653

Amended by
- Public Act 102-1104
- Status: In force

The Safety, Accountability, Fairness and Equity-Today Act, commonly known as the SAFE-T Act, is a state of Illinois statute enacted in 2021 that makes a number of reforms to the criminal justice system, affecting policing, pretrial detention and bail, sentencing, and corrections. The Act's section on pretrial detention, which took effect in full on September 18, 2023, is also known as the Pretrial Fairness Act.

== Background ==
Following the widespread George Floyd protests in the summer of 2020, the Illinois Legislative Black Caucus proposed an extensive legislative package that included criminal justice reforms alongside reforms in education, health care and human services, and economic policy. The Black Caucus decided to pursue their proposed criminal justice reforms as an omnibus bill, which they introduced and advanced when the legislature convened in January 2021.

The proposed omnibus criminal justice reform bill incorporated a number of proposed reforms in police training, rules, and oversight, pretrial court processes, sentencing, and corrections. The omnibus bill incorporated two prior legislative proposals: the Pretrial Fairness Act sponsored by Senator Robert Peters and a police certification reform proposal championed by Attorney General Kwame Raoul.

Proponents in the state legislature championed the bill as "a broad and ambitious initiative that takes a detailed look at sentencing reform, policing [and] violence reduction." The bill was opposed by the Illinois Law Enforcement Coalition and Republican lawmakers. After private negotiations, several provisions were removed from the bill, including a proposal to end qualified immunity for law enforcement.

The amended omnibus bill passed by a vote of 32–23 in the state Senate on January 13, 2021, and was later approved by the House. Governor J. B. Pritzker signed the bill into law on February 22, 2021, at a signing ceremony at Chicago State University.

== Provisions ==
=== Pretrial Fairness Act ===
The SAFE-T Act incorporated provisions from a previously proposed bill, the Pretrial Fairness Act. The most significant change in this section of the Act is the elimination of cash bail and its replacement with a new process for pretrial release, which was set to take effect on January 1, 2023. After legal challenges, the provision was upheld and took effect on September 18, 2023.

In the prior system, judges set an amount of "cash bail" or "money bond" for detained individuals. Detainees could be released prior to a trial if they paid the amount of bail. In the new system, the role of cash payments will be eliminated and judges will determine whether detained individuals pose a risk if released. Pretrial release can be denied by a judge after a hearing, "when it is determined that the defendant poses a specific, real and present threat to a person, or has a high likelihood of willful flight."

In addition to the abolition of cash bail, other pretrial reforms in the Act include:

- Establishment of a Pretrial Practices Data Oversight Board
- Establishment of a Domestic Violence Pretrial Practices Working Group
- Notification of pretrial hearing to victims of crimes
- Rules enabling the revocation of pretrial release under certain conditions

=== Policing reforms ===
The SAFE-T Act includes a range of reforms on policing practices and police accountability, including the following:

- Expansion of training for police officers
- Reforms to use of force policies, including limits on the use of deadly force, ban on chokeholds, requirement to provide aid after use of force, and requirement to intervene if other officers use excessive force
- Prohibition on purchasing specific types of military equipment for police use
- Requirement for all law enforcement agencies to use body cameras by 2025
- Requirements on reporting of deaths in police custody and use of force by police officers
- Reforms to police misconduct policies, including enhanced whistleblower protections, expansion of misconduct database, rules on the maintenance of police misconduct records, requirement to use of special prosecutors in officer-involved deaths, and removal of police discipline from collective bargaining process
- Establishment of new processes for decertification of law enforcement officers due to misconduct
- Increased funding and support for local law enforcement to adopt "co-responder" models where other first responders or mental health professionals accompany law enforcement, particularly in response to substance abuse and mental health concerns

=== Prison and sentencing reforms ===
The SAFE-T Act includes reforms concerning the rights of prisoners and other detainees, including:

- Increased support for pregnant prisoners
- Increased amount of "sentence credits" that prisoners serving a sentence of 5 years or more can earn for participation in programs such as work release or educational programs
- Creation and protection of detainees to make three free phone calls and to retrieve phone numbers from their mobile phones prior to the confiscation of the phone

The Act makes several reforms to sentencing policies by:

- Enabling defendants convicted of certain drug offenses to have those offenses treated as misdemeanors for the purpose of qualifying for diversion, deflection, or probation programs
- Allowing those on electronic monitoring and home detention to do certain additional tasks such as grocery shopping
- Reduces the amount of time that individuals must be on parole (officially called "mandatory supervised release") for certain offenses
- Narrowing the "felony murder" rule such that "a person cannot be charged with first-degree murder unless they, or one of the other participants in the crime, directly caused a death"; previously, "a person could be charged with first-degree murder even if neither they, nor their co-defendants, pulled the trigger"

The Act also ends prison gerrymandering in Illinois by requiring that people in prison are counted as residents of their last known address for the purpose of creating electoral districts. This provision takes effect in 2025, meaning that the first redistricting process to be affected by it will be in 2031.

=== Crime victims' compensation ===
The Act makes several amendments to the Crime Victims Compensation Act, designed to expand the definition of victims and make it easier for victims to apply for cash compensation.

=== Other provisions ===
The Act reforms several aspects of the state's vehicle code, including "end[ing] driver’s license suspensions for failure to pay automated camera tickets, traffic fines and abandoned vehicle fees."

== Reactions ==
The SAFE-T Act's passage made Illinois the first state in the United States to abolish cash bail as the standard of pretrial detention. House Speaker Emanuel Chris Welch framed the Act as part of a broader effort "to remedy inequalities" in light of the "past year's reckoning of racial injustice." In his signing statement, Governor Pritzker called the legislation "a substantial step toward dismantling the systemic racism that plagues our communities, our state and our nation and brings us closer to true safety, true fairness and true justice." The Act was largely lauded by advocates of criminal justice reform. Republican lawmakers and several law enforcement officials strongly opposed the legislation. By mid-2022, however, law enforcement opposition to the Act had slightly softened.

Ahead of the 2022 elections, the Pretrial Fairness Act has been the subject of significant criticism and some misinformation by opponents. Several widely distributed mailers, funded by conservative activists Dan Proft and Brian Timpone designed to appear as newspapers, characterized the end of cash bail in 2023 as "the end of days" and alleged that criminals would be released from prison. Opponents have also spread content on social media claiming that the law would create "non-detainable offenses" and similarly alleging that criminals would be released from prison. Social media content and conservative news outlets promoting these claims have likened the law to the fictional horror film series The Purge. Similar claims and Purge references have also been made by former Republican gubernatorial candidate Darren Bailey. These claims have been challenged and debunked by legal experts and fact-checkers. Advocates of the law have noted that there are no "non-detainable offenses" in Illinois law and argued that the Act ensures pretrial detention will no longer depend on "how much money a person has in their bank account."

Three elected prosecutors (called "state's attorneys" in Illinois) from Will, McHenry, and Kankakee counties filed lawsuits challenging the constitutionality of the Act. In 2023, the Illinois Supreme Court upheld the law.

== Implementation ==
=== Amendments ===
The Illinois legislature passed a set of amendments to the Act on December 1, 2022, which was signed into law by Governor Pritzker on December 6. Changes related to pretrial detention include a provision that those charged before January 1, 2023, would be able to stay on the old cash bail system or request to be moved to the new system, and "felonies and crimes such as kidnapping and arson to the charges that qualify someone to be detained while awaiting trial." Other changes "clarify court authority in controlling electronic monitoring and escape, outline specific guidelines for trespassing violations, and create a grant program to aid public defenders with increased caseloads."

=== Legal challenges ===
On December 28, 2022, in a case that combined 60 lawsuits, Kankakee County Chief Judge Thomas Cunnington ruled that the Act's provision ending cash bail violated the state constitution. The ruling only applies to some judicial districts in the state covered by the lawsuits, and the impact of the ruling on the immediate implementation of the law was unclear as the judge did not issue an injunction. After the ruling, Attorney General Kwame Raoul announced that the state would appeal the decision at the Supreme Court of Illinois. On December 31, 2022, the Court issued a temporary stay on the provision ending cash bail pending its review, "in order to maintain consistent pretrial procedures throughout Illinois." On July 18, 2023, the Court upheld the provision ending cash bail. The provision took effect on September 18, 2023.

=== Enforcement ===
In November 2026, the Illinois Law Enforcement Training and Standards Board decertified a East Carondelet police officer, marking the first use of the Act's new process for decertifying officers due to misconduct.

== See also ==
- Criminal justice reform in the United States
- Bail in the United States
