= 2020 California Proposition 25 =

Ballot proposition on the bail system

Proposition 25
- November 3, 2020
- Referendum to Overturn a 2018 Law That Replaced Money Bail System with A System Based on Public Safety Risk

Results
Choice	Votes	%
Yes	7,232,380	43.59%
No	9,358,226	56.41%
Valid votes	16,590,606	93.28%
Invalid or blank votes	1,194,545	6.72%
Total votes	17,785,151	100.00%
Registered voters/turnout	22,047,448	80.67%
County results
For
60%–70%
50%–60%
Against
80%–90%
70%–80%
60%–70%
50%–60%

Proposition 25, officially the Referendum to Overturn a 2018 Law That Replaced Money Bail System with A System Based on Public Safety Risk, is a California ballot proposition that appeared on the ballot for the general election on November 3, 2020. The "no" side prevailed, resulting in retention of the system of cash bail in the state.

The proposition was a veto-referendum that was placed on the ballot by the American Bail Coalition. Placed on the ballot via petition, it is a referendum on 2018's Senate Bill 10, which would have replaced the state's cash bail system with a risk assessment-based bail system, which uses an algorithm to determine whether a suspect should be released. SB 10 had been signed into law in August 2018, and had been scheduled to take effect on October 1, 2019.

A "yes" vote on Proposition 25 was to uphold the contested legislation to replace cash bail with risk assessments, and a "no" vote was to repeal the contested legislation, and continue the system of cash bail.

== Background ==
As of 2019, California used a cash bail system to release criminal suspects awaiting trial and to ensure that they return for their court dates. On August 28, 2018, then governor Jerry Brown signed SB10, which ended the use of cash bail, replacing it with a risk assessment. The American Bail Coalition, a trade association, organized and led the effort to repeal this legislation.

== Support ==
The California Democratic Party supported the Yes on Proposition 25 campaign, as did Governor Gavin Newsom and Assembly speaker Anthony Rendon. In addition, the Service Employees International Union and the California Medical Association supported Yes on Proposition 25.

== Opposition ==
Various groups argued against Proposition 25, and hence against SB10.

The California Peace Officers' Association and the California Bail Agents Association opposed SB10.

In addition, civil rights advocates argued that the algorithm should not be used for release decisions, and that SB10 did not sufficiently address supposed racial biases in the criminal justice system. The California Conference of the NAACP and Human Rights Watch opposed SB10 for similar reasons.

== Polling ==
Poll source	Date(s) administered	Sample size (Note: Key: A – all adults RV – registered voters LV – likely voters V – unclear)	Margin of error	For Prop. 25 (uphold bail reform law)	Against Prop. 25 (repeal bail reform law)	Undecided
UC Berkeley Institute of Governmental Studies/LA Times	September 13–18, 2019	3,945 (LV)	± 2%	39%	32%	29%

== Results ==
Choice	Votes	%
For	7,232,380	43.59
Against	9,358,226	56.41
Blank votes	1,194,545	-
Total	17,785,151	100
Registered voters/turnout	22,047,448	80.67
Source: elections.cdn.sos.ca.gov
