= The Sentencing Project =

American criminal justice advocacy group

- Abbreviation: TSP
- Formation: 1986; 40 years ago
- Type: Advocacy group
- Legal status: Active
- Headquarters: Washington, District of Columbia
- Executive Director: Kara Gotsch
- Website: www.sentencingproject.org

The Sentencing Project is a Washington, D.C.–based research and advocacy centre working for decarceration in the United States and seeking to address racial disparities in the criminal justice system. The organisation produces nonpartisan reports and research for use by state and federal policymakers, administrators, and journalists.

== History ==
The Sentencing Project grew out of pilot programs established by lawyer Malcolm C. Young in the early 1980s. In 1981, Young became the director of a project of the National Legal Aid & Defender Association (NLADA) designed to establish defence-based sentencing advocacy programs. In 1986, Young incorporated The Sentencing Project as an independent organisation to continue NLADA's program of training and development work. In the late 1980s, The Sentencing Project became engaged in research and public education on a broad range of criminal justice policy issues.

== Advocacy ==
The Sentencing Project works with other organisations and public officials to influence criminal justice policies at the federal, state, and local level. The Sentencing Project was part of a national coalition supporting the bipartisan Sentencing Reform and Corrections Act in the 114th Congress. The organisation's executive director testified before the Senate Judiciary Committee in support of the legislation.

In 2010, The Sentencing Project contributed to the passage of the Fair Sentencing Act, which reduced the disparities in sentences associated with convictions for possessing or trafficking in crack cocaine compared to powder cocaine. Representatives of the organisation have testified before Congress, the U.S. Sentencing Commission, the U.S. Commission on Civil Rights, and other government and scholarly meetings.

== Research ==
In 2016, The Sentencing Project was active in the national debate about racial and ethnic disparities in arrests, sentencing and incarceration, and has monitored and reported on the denial of voting rights to individuals with felony convictions. It consistently criticises what it considers the ineffectiveness and excessive public expense associated with mass incarceration and extended prison terms.

In 2016, the organisation produced a state-by-state breakdown on the disenfranchisement of citizens convicted of felonies entitled Six Million Lost Voters. It documented 6.1 million potential voters, including more than 4 million who had long since completed their sentences, unable to participate because of state laws disenfranchising them. Florida, a perennial swing state, led the country with 1.5 million people convicted of felonies who could not vote.

In recent years, The Sentencing Project has published reports and research on mandatory minimum sentences and their impact on judicial discretion; the increased reliance in the courts on life sentences, some without opportunities for parole; prison closures and repurposing; the impact of racial perceptions in criminal justice policy; the war on drugs and its collateral consequences; juvenile justice issues; women in prison; the children of prisoners and the long-term social impact of mass incarceration policies.

== Leadership ==
Marc Mauer has been the executive director of The Sentencing Project since 2005. He has authored a number of books, articles, and studies about the criminal justice system.

The Sentencing Project is governed by a 10-member board of lawyers, academics, and practitioners, chaired by American University law professor Cynthia E. Jones.

== See also ==
- Felony disenfranchisement in the United States
