= Equal Justice Under Law (civil rights organization) =

Civil rights organisation in Washington D.C

- Founded: 2014
- Founders: Phil Telfeyan; Alec Karakatsanis
- Type: 501(c)(3) nonprofit organization
- Tax ID no.: 46-2209985
- Purpose: Civil rights impact litigation
- Headquarters: Washington, D.C.
- Website: https://equaljusticeunderlaw.org

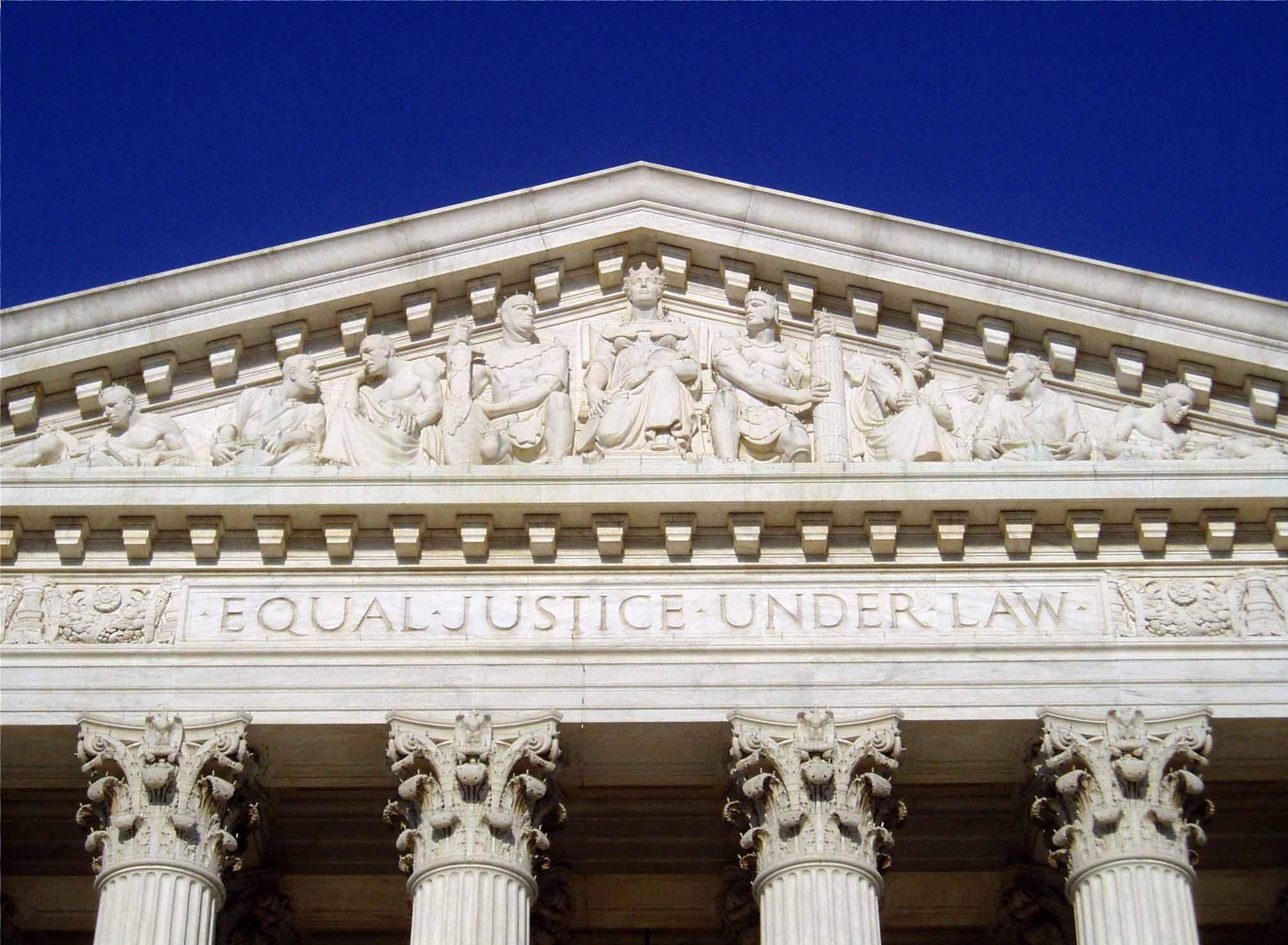
The inscription Equal Justice Under Law as seen on the frieze of the United States Supreme Court Building

Equal Justice Under Law is an American civil rights impact litigation nonprofit based in Washington, D.C., which accepts cases on a national basis. The organization was founded in 2014 by Alec Karakatsanis and Phil Telfeyan, two 2008 Harvard Law School graduates. The mission of Equal Justice Under Law is to achieve equality in the criminal system (especially wealth-based inequality) and break cycles of poverty for those involved with the legal system. The organization works on a range of issues, including money bail, fees for expungement, and suspension of driver's licenses. Equal Justice Under Law and its small team of lawyers seek to drive change in the legal system through impact litigation and class action lawsuits. The firm's work has received national attention in news outlets including The New York Times, The Washington Post, National Public Radio, USA Today, the San Francisco Chronicle, the Detroit Free Press, in addition to strong local coverage of its lawsuits.

Equal Justice Under Law received its initial funding from the Harvard Law School Public Service Venture Fund, which supports graduates of the law school in public service ventures. To support its continued operations, the organization is funded by individual donors and various grants for nonprofits fighting inequality in the legal system.

Co-founder Alec Karakatsanis left the organization in 2016 to found the Civil Rights Corps, building on Equal Justice Under Law's mission to fight for justice in the legal system. The other founder, Phil Telfeyan, has continued to serve as Executive Director in his absence.

As of September 2021, Equal Justice Under Law claims to have litigated on behalf of over 1.5 million class members in 16 states. The organization is seen as a leader in the fight against money bail, having been the first to successfully litigate a case challenging money bail on constitutional grounds. As of the end of 2020, it had filed 10 cases across multiple states, and the early successes led to further litigation by the ACLU and other major legal nonprofits. Equal Justice Under Law has been active in cases where poor criminal defendants have been jailed due to inability to post bond or pay fines.

The name of the organization is a reference to the frieze above the entrance of the United States Supreme Court Building.
