= California Peace Officers' Association =

Non-profit association

California Peace Officers’ Association
- Founded: 1921
- Headquarters: 2485 Natomas Park Drive, Suite 540; Sacramento, CA 95833
- Location: Sacramento, California
- Members: 25,000+
- Key people: Chief Neil Cervenka, President
- Website: cpoa.org

The California Peace Officers' Association (abbreviated CPOA) is a non-profit professional association dedicated to the training and leadership development of law enforcement officers of California. The organization, established in 1921, has a membership more than 25,000 officers and professional staff across municipal, county, state and federal law enforcement agencies in California. As of 2024–2025, CPOA is led by President Neil Cervenka, Chief of the Fort Bragg Police Department.

== Political positions ==
In 2014, CPOA opposed Proposition 47, which reduced punishments for nonviolent crimes in a bid to reduce overcrowding in state prison and fund recidivism programs.

In 2017, CPOA opposed a campaign led by California Lieutenant Governor Gavin Newsom to legalize marijuana in the state.

CPOA opposed California Senate Bill 54 (2017), which prevents state and local law enforcement agencies from using their resources on behalf of federal immigration enforcement agencies.

In March 2018, Attorney General Jeff Sessions spoke to the CPOA in opposition to California's sanctuary city laws, where he announced a federal lawsuit against the state's immigration laws.

In October 2019, Newsom signed a bill, AB 1215, which bans law enforcement from using facial recognition technology on body cameras. CPOA has opposed the bill, saying "threatens the future of effective policing and crime reduction".

== See also ==
- List of law enforcement agencies in California
