= Bail in the United States =

In the United States, bail is the practice of releasing suspects from custody before their hearing, typically on payment of a bail bond, which is money or pledge of property to the court which may be refunded if suspects return to court for their trial. Practices vary between states.

== General procedure ==
To protect a criminal suspect's interest in pretrial liberty, a bail hearing is required to be held in a "timely manner" before a judge after arrest. The exact time limit varies slightly depending upon the jurisdiction, but the U.S. Supreme Court has set an outer boundary of 48 hours.

The regular rules of evidence do not apply at a bail hearing. It is extremely difficult to complete an initial investigation and adequately prepare witnesses and documents for presentation in court within 48 hours of arrest. Unless the underlying crime is a cold case, victims and witnesses are usually traumatized and not ready to confront the suspect in open court. For these reasons, the prosecution typically proceeds by "proffer" alone. Instead of presenting witness testimony and documents that would be admissible at trial, the prosecutor merely makes an unsworn oral promise to the judge as to what the evidence will show as to the suspect's dangerousness, likelihood of guilt, and propensity to flee the jurisdiction. This procedure has been "uniformly" approved of by all federal courts of appeals and numerous state appellate courts.

However, this rule does not mean the prosecution has carte blanche. The prosecutor must present a proffer in the form of "reliable facts", ideally corroborated by various forms of evidence (which may lack a complete foundation but otherwise seem reliable), as opposed to vague "general assertions" about what the evidence "may" show at trial. The trial court retains the discretion to demand the presentation of admissible evidence if the proffer appears to be unreliable but the court is reluctant to release the defendant on his own recognizance.

The right to counsel attaches at the bail hearing, because it usually marks the start of adversarial judicial proceedings arising out of an arrest. However, the U.S. Supreme Court has never expressly held that the right to counsel must be honored at the bail hearing, as opposed to merely appointing counsel afterwards. Only ten states and the District of Columbia guarantee the right to counsel at all bail hearings, thirty states are "hybrid" states where it varies by county, and ten states expressly deny the right.

== History ==
Bail mechanisms were originally intended to allow someone charged with a crime to remain free until their trial (being presumed innocent) while ensuring that they would show up for it. A person's family or business acquaintances often had an interest in seeing them appear in court and would help to ensure that they did so. Some historians speculate that a shift towards the use of cash bail may have occurred with western expansion, as people became more transient and lacked connection with local family and community.

During the pre-independence era of the United States, bail law was based on English law. Some of the colonies simply guaranteed their subjects the protections of that law. In 1776, after the Declaration of Independence, those states that had not already done so enacted their own versions of bail law. For example, Section 9 of Virginia's 1776 Constitution originally stated, "excessive bail ought not to be required..." In 1785, Virginia added an additional protection to its constitution, "Those shall be let to bail who are apprehended for any crime not punishable in life or limb...But if a crime be punishable by life or limb, or if it be manslaughter and there be good cause to believe the party guilty thereof, he shall not be admitted to bail." Section 29 of the Pennsylvania Constitution of 1776 states that "Excessive bail shall not be exacted for bailable offences: And all fines shall be moderate."

In 1789, the same year that the United States Bill of Rights was introduced, Congress passed the Judiciary Act of 1789. That law specified which types of crimes were bailable and set bounds on a judge's discretion in setting bail. The Act provided that all non-capital crimes are bailable and that in capital cases the decision to detain a suspect prior to trial was to be left to the judge:

Upon all arrests in criminal cases, bail shall be admitted, except where punishment may be by death, in which cases it shall not be admitted but by the supreme or a circuit court, or by a justice of the supreme court, or a judge of a district court, who shall exercise their discretion therein.

The prohibition against excessive bail in the Eighth Amendment is derived from the Virginia Constitution. That prohibition applies in federal criminal prosecutions but, as the Supreme Court has not extended that protection to the States through the Fourteenth Amendment, the Eighth Amendment protection does not apply to defendants charged in state courts.

The creation of cash bail as a business is often dated to 1896, when San Francisco bartenders Peter P. McDonough and his brother Thomas McDonough began putting up bail money for patrons of their father's saloon. Eventually offering a wide variety of "services" to those arrested, McDonough became a central figure in the underworld and police corruption.

== Federal law ==
=== Bail Reform Act of 1966 ===
In 1966, Congress enacted the Bail Reform Act, which expanded the bail rights of federal criminal defendants by giving non-capital defendants a statutory right to be released pending trial, on their personal recognizance or on personal bond, unless a judicial officer determined that such incentives would not adequately assure the defendant's appearance at trial. In the event that further assurance was deemed necessary, the judicial officer was required to select an alternative from a list of conditions, such as restrictions on travel. When setting bail, judicial officers were required to consider a defendant's family and community ties, employment history, and past record of court appearances.

In non-capital cases, the Act did not permit a judge to consider a suspect's danger to the community; only in capital cases or after conviction is the judge authorized to do so. Individuals charged with a capital crime, or who had been convicted and were awaiting sentencing or appeal, were to be released unless the judicial officer had reason to believe that no conditions would reasonably assure that the person would not flee or pose a danger.

The 1966 Act did not provide significant benefits to those defendants who were required to post bail but lacked the financial means to raise and post bail. Due to the need to produce information about an arrested person in advance of bail hearing, the law also worked best for defendants who had access to lawyers who could help them compile that information in the short amount of time between arrest and hearing.

==== District of Columbia ====
The 1966 Act was particularly criticized within the District of Columbia, where all crimes formerly fell under federal bail law. In a number of cases, persons accused of violent crimes committed additional crimes when released on their personal recognizance. Even after being arrested on additional charges, some of those individuals were released yet again.

D.C.'s Committee on the Judiciary and Public Safety recommended that, even in non-capital cases, a person's dangerousness should be considered in determining conditions for release. The District of Columbia Court Reform and Criminal Procedure Act of 1970 allowed judges to consider dangerousness and risk of flight when setting bail in non-capital cases.

=== Bail Reform Act of 1984 ===
In a pivotal decision that legitimized changes in detention procedure in the United States, Congress repealed the Bail Reform Act of 1966 through its passage of the Bail Reform Act of 1984. This was codified at United States Code, Title 18, Sections 3141–3150. Unlike its predecessor, the 1984 Act law permits pre-trial detention of individuals based upon their danger to the community, not solely upon the risk of flight. 18 U.S.C. § 3142(f) provides that only persons who fit into certain categories are subject to detention without bail: persons charged with a crime of violence, an offense for which the maximum sentence is life imprisonment or death, certain drug offenses for which the maximum offense is greater than 10 years, repeat felony offenders, or if the defendant poses a serious risk of flight, obstruction of justice, or witness tampering. There is a special hearing held to determine whether the defendant fits within these categories; anyone not within them must be admitted to bail.

When persons charged with federal crimes are deemed to pose a risk to their communities, a judge must order pretrial detention.

==== Denial of bail ====
In a 1987 decision, United States v. Salerno, the Supreme Court upheld the 1984 Act's provision providing for pretrial detention based on community-danger. Under the Salerno ruling, pretrial detention without bail on the grounds of an arrestee's dangerousness is constitutional. According to the text of the decision, pretrial detention was considered to be a form of "regulation" rather than of "punishment".

Bail may also be denied if the funds used to post the bail likely came from an illegal source. If the source of the funds is illegal, it is deemed less likely that the posting of such funds as bail will ensure the defendant's appearance in court, and hence bail may be denied. The court may order a hearing called a Nebbia hearing to determine the source of the prospective bail funds before making a decision on bail.

==== Effect ====
A 1987 study of its immediate effects in the Eastern Federal District of California found little change in average detention length and overall detention rate before and after 1984, with rates of pretrial crime and failure to appear on the trial date remaining relatively low after the law's passing.

However, over time bail practices correlated with an increased number of people being held in U.S. jails. The number of unconvicted people held in U.S. jails increased by 59% between 1996 and 2014. Ninety-five percent of the total increase in U.S. jail populations has been due to the incarceration of unconvicted people, who represented 74% of the total jail population as of 2020. The use of pretrial detention at the federal level has risen from roughly 26% of defendants before 1984 (when the Bail Reform Act was passed) to 59% as of 2017 (excluding immigration cases). Detention rates are even higher in immigration cases.

=== Crimes against minors ===
In 2006, Congress passed the Adam Walsh Child Protection and Safety Act (AWA) which included amendments to the 1984 Act in response to a highly publicized case of sexual abuse and murder of a child. The amendments provide that any persons accused of a crime involving a minor must be confined, under curfew, and must report regularly to a law enforcement agency.

Critics of the AWA argue that Congress should change the amendments so that a defendant has the opportunity to challenge release conditions that include tracking and monitoring. They argue that the AWA violates defendants' constitutional rights and undermine the objectives of the 1984 Act by stripping defendants of their rights without significant benefit to the public. Critics propose that defendants charged with offenses that trigger the AWA should be permitted to attempt to prove that its strict pretrial release conditions are unnecessary in their individual cases.

== State laws ==
Bail laws vary from state to state. Generally, a person charged with a non-capital crime can be expected to be granted bail. Some states have enacted statutes modeled on federal law that permit pretrial detention of persons charged with serious violent offenses, if it can be demonstrated that the defendant is a flight risk or a danger to the community. Since 2014, New Jersey and Alaska have enacted reforms that have abolished cash bail for the majority of cases. These states now give defendants a supervised release or mandatory detention, with the conditions determined with a risk assessment.

As of 2008, only four states — Illinois, Kentucky, Oregon and Wisconsin — had abolished commercial/for-profit bail bonds by bail bondsmen and required deposits to courts instead. As of 2012, Nebraska and Maine joined in prohibiting surety bail bonds.

In 2021, Illinois abolished cash bail in a provision of the SAFE-T Act, which included a number of law enforcement reform measures. After legal challenges, the provision eliminating cash bail took effect in 2023.

Some states have very strict guidelines for judges to follow; these are usually provided in the form of a published bail schedule. These schedules list every single crime defined by state law and prescribe a presumptive dollar value of bail for each one. Judges who wish to depart from the schedule must state specific reasons on the record for doing so. Some states go so far as to require certain forfeitures, bail, and fines for certain crimes.

=== California ===
California uses a bail schedule system, and judges in state court are directed to refer to the bail schedule while also taking into account the defendant's criminal record and whether the defendant poses a danger to the community.

The California legislature attempted to eliminate cash bail entirely. In August 2018, Governor Jerry Brown signed into law a bill which sought replace all cash bail with pretrial detention based on court risk assessment beginning in October 2019. The bill was opposed by both defenders of the current system and advocates for change, including the American Civil Liberties Union and Human Rights Watch. In January 2019, that coalition gathered the required signatures to prevent the bill from going into effect and put the law to November 2020 voters as a California ballot proposition. 2020 California Proposition 25 resulted in a "no" majority and a successful veto of the change.

In California bail is heavily regulated by the California Penal Code, California Insurance Code and California Code of Regulations. All violations of the aforementioned constitute felony violations via California Insurance Code 1814 - including administrative regulatory codes such as record keeping, how solicitations are conducted, collateral and treatment of arrestees. Under California law it is a crime for a bail bondsman to solicit business at a county jail.

In March 2021, the California Supreme Court ruled In re Kenneth Humphrey that people cannot be detained simply because they cannot afford to pay cash bail. During the COVID-19 pandemic, California introduced a $0 cash bail for misdemeanors and some non-violent felonies to reduce the spread.

=== Illinois ===
In Illinois, after widespread activism that peaked during the George Floyd protests in 2020, the state legislature's Black Caucus included the "Pretrial Fairness Act", a proposal to eliminate cash bail and replace it with an alternative system, in its set of proposed criminal justice reforms. The measure was passed in 2021 as part of the omnibus SAFE-T Act. After legal challenges, it is set to take effect on September 18, 2023. In the new system, the role of cash payments will be eliminated and judges will determine whether detained individuals pose a risk if released. Pretrial release can be denied by a judge after a hearing, "when it is determined that the defendant poses a specific, real and present threat to a person, or has a high likelihood of willful flight."

=== New York ===
In 2023, The New York Times reported New York is the only state where judges are prohibited from explicitly assessing a defendant's "dangerousness" when setting bail.

=== Texas ===
By state law, "the ability to make bail is to be regarded, and proof may be taken upon this point."

Some courts in Texas, however, have determined bail in accord with a fixed schedule, without consideration of the defendant's ability to pay the scheduled amount.

=== Tennessee ===
In Tennessee, all offenses are bailable, but bail may be denied to those accused of capital crimes.

== Types ==
In the United States there are several forms of bail used, which vary from jurisdiction. "The dominant forms of release are by surety bond, i.e. release on bail that is lent to the accused by a bond dealer, and non-financial release."

- Surety bond: By a surety bond, a third party agrees to be responsible for the debt or obligation of the defendant. In many jurisdictions this service is provided commercially by a bail bondsman, where the agent will receive 10% of the bail amount up front and will keep that amount regardless of whether the defendant appears in court. The court in many jurisdictions, especially states that as of 2012 prohibited surety bail bondsmen – Oregon, Nebraska, Wisconsin, Illinois, Kentucky and Maine – may demand a certain amount of the total bail (typically 10%) be given to the court, which is known as surety on the bond and unlike with bail bondsmen, is returned if the defendant does not violate the conditions of bail. The bail agent guarantees to the court that they will pay the forfeited bond if a defendant fails to appear for their scheduled court appearances, so the third party must have adequate assets to satisfy the face value of the bond. In turn, the bond agency charges a premium for this service and usually requires collateral from a guarantor. The bail agent then posts a bond for the amount of the bail, to guarantee the arrestee's return to court.
- Recognizance: Accused who are released on recognizance do not have to pay any bail, but must promise to attend all required judicial proceedings and engage in no illegal activity or other prohibited conduct as set by the court. This is called "release on one's own recognizance" or "ROR".
- Unsecured bail: This is a release without a deposit but it differs from ROR in that the defendant must pay a fee upon breaching the terms of the bail. This is typically called an "unsecured appearance bond".
- Percentage bail. The defendant deposits only a percentage of the bail's amount (usually 10%) with the court clerk.
- Citation release, also known as cite out: This procedure involves the issuance of a citation by the arresting officer to the arrestee, which mandates that the arrestee appears at an appointed court date. Cite outs usually occur immediately after an individual is arrested and no financial security is taken.
- Property bond: The accused or a person acting on his behalf pledges real property having a value at least equal to the amount of the bail. If the principal fails to appear for trial the state can levy or institute foreclosure proceedings against the property to recover the bail. Used in rare cases and in certain jurisdictions. Often, the equity of the property must be twice the amount of the bail set.
- Immigration bond: Used when the defendant that been arrested is an illegal immigrant. This is a federal bond and not a state bond. The defendant deals directly with either the Department of Homeland Security (DHS) or the Bureau of Immigration and Customs Enforcement (ICE).
- Cash, typically "cash-only", where the only form of bail that the Court will accept is cash: Court-ordered cash bonds require the total amount of bail to be posted in cash. The court holds this money until the case is concluded. Cash bonds are typically ordered by the Court for the following reasons: when the Court believes the defendant is a flight risk, when the Court issues a warrant for unpaid fines, and when a defendant has failed to appear for a prior hearing. Cash bonds provide a powerful incentive for defendants to appear for their hearings. If the defendant does not appear as instructed, the cash bond is forfeited and a bench warrant is issued. If the defendant shows up for their scheduled court appearances, the cash is returned to the person who posted the bond. Anyone including the defendant can post a cash bond. If the defendant posts his own bond, the Court will deduct fines and costs from the bond before returning any balance.
- Pretrial services: A defendant is released to the supervision of a pretrial services officer, similar to a probation officer. In most cases defendants have no financial obligation to be supervised. The Pretrial Services Programs can include phone or in-person check-ins, drug testing, court date reminders, and any other condition the judges deems necessary.
- Combinations: Courts often allow defendants to post cash bail or surety bond, and then impose further conditions, as mentioned below, to protect the community or ensure attendance.
- Conditions of release: Many varied non-monetary conditions and restrictions on liberty can be imposed by a court to ensure that a person released into the community will appear in court and not commit any more crimes. Common examples include: mandatory calls to the police, regular check-ins with a Pretrial Services Program, surrendering passports, home detention, electronic monitoring, drug testing, alcohol counseling, surrendering firearms.
- Protective order, also called an 'order of protection' or restraining order: One very common feature of any conditional release, whether on bail, bond or condition, is a court order requiring the defendant to refrain from criminal activity against the alleged crime victim, or stay away from and have no contact with the alleged crime victim. The former is a limited order, the latter a full order. Violation of the order can subject the defendant to automatic forfeiture of bail and further fine or imprisonment.
- Stationhouse bail: In this case bail is set and can be paid by a defendant accused of a misdemeanor at the police station. This allows them to be released prior to appearing before a judge. Stationhouse bail uses a fixed amount in order to make bail for certain law violations.

== Criticism ==
Criticism of the practice of giving bail in the United States tends to be directed at the system of cash bail. A core assumption underlying the system of cash bail is the idea that defendants are more likely to avoid criminal activity and attend court if they have a negative financial incentive. Critics of the system of cash bail often argue that this assumption is incorrect. Low-cost alternatives that can increase appearances in court include automated court notification reminders via text messages.

Negative consequences of pretrial detention include damage to a defendant's job, loss of income, housing, family and community relationships, and custody of children. The weight of paying for bail premiums often falls on other family members, who may be faced with the choice of paying for bail premiums or necessities such as rent, food, and medicine. Pretrial incarceration may also increase the risk that defendants may be wrongly convicted or drawn further into crime.

As of 2017, approximately 450,000 people were being held in pretrial detention at any given time because they were denied bail or were unable to pay the amount of bail that had been set.

A 2015 study of a "large northern urban jurisdiction in the United States" found that women who were released on bond had their bond set on average 54% lower than the bond that men were required to pay for comparable offenses. Based upon their findings and a review of other articles that examined gender-based disparities in criminal prosecutions, the authors asserted that there is strong evidence that women were more likely than men to be treated leniently by the judicial system.

Studies have documented that "the field of bail produces patterned and predictable harms that disproportionally fall on the poor and people of color." The system has been shown to be affected by racial bias against Black and Latin American defendants as compared to white defendants. White defendants are more likely to be released and less likely to have financial bail set. A defendant's chance of being released pre-trial is affected by how wealthy they are, with the intersection of wealth and race working against people of color.

=== Wealth bias ===
Then California Senator Kamala Harris talks about wealth bias and bail reform in 2017.

A common criticism of the system of cash bail is that it creates a system where wealthier defendants are less likely to be incarcerated pre-trial than poorer defendants, even if they are accused of the same crime and pose the same risk to the community and judicial process.

In the high-profile cases of Bernie Madoff and Marc Dreier, the defendants avoided pre-trial detention despite huge flight risks, simply because they had the money to pay the court exorbitant sums. This is in accordance to the current interpretation of the Bail Reform Act of 1984, which allows the wealthy to avoid pretrial detainment by paying for highly restrictive measures that ensure constant supervision. This means that a poor defendant could end up held in jail while waiting for a trial, while a wealthy defendant would only face house arrest while waiting trial for the same offense. Bail reformists claim that this is a direct violation of the Fourteenth Amendment's Equal Protection Clause, which states that laws must be applied against all citizens equally.

=== Unnecessary incarceration ===
Reform campaigners argue that the cash bail system results in unnecessary detentions, and propose reforms that will reduce the jail population.

Advocates for harsher bail enforcement argue that low or no bail increases the risk that defendants may skip their trial (known as flight risk). However, a study conducted by Gerald R. Wheeler and Carol L. Wheeler published by the Review of Policy Research finds that this is hardly the case. The paper concluded that the flight risk of arrestees out on bail was extremely minimal, as only 2% of all defendants on pretrial leave avoided their trial date.

==== Socioeconomic effects ====
At the community level, pretrial detention has been found to negatively affect local labor markets, especially in areas with relatively high percentages of Black residents. Whether a result of pre-trial detention or not, incarceration has adverse individual-level effects, resulting in many defendants' inability to maintain employment, access mental and physical healthcare, and engage in constant communication with their family and friends.

Pretrial release conditions placed on youth are largely ineffective, often causing them to commit further crimes by violating the conditions. This means that bail conditions ultimately create a cycle of criminality, trapping juveniles into the prison system rather than helping them escape it. This effect on the youth community is a large reason why activists lobby for bail reform, seeking to prevent the next generation from being trapped in the school-to-prison pipeline. The VISTA bail bond program in Baltimore in the 1960s, which dealt with 16-20 year old defendants, suggested that while youth are more susceptible to negative consequences of pretrial release conditions, they are also more receptive to positive bail reform programs.

There exist socioeconomic arguments against bail reform as well. For example, one cost-benefit analysis of bail pricing using data from the 1981 Philadelphia Bail Experiment estimated optimal bail prices to be similar to higher levels before the Bail Reform Acts of 1966 and 1984.

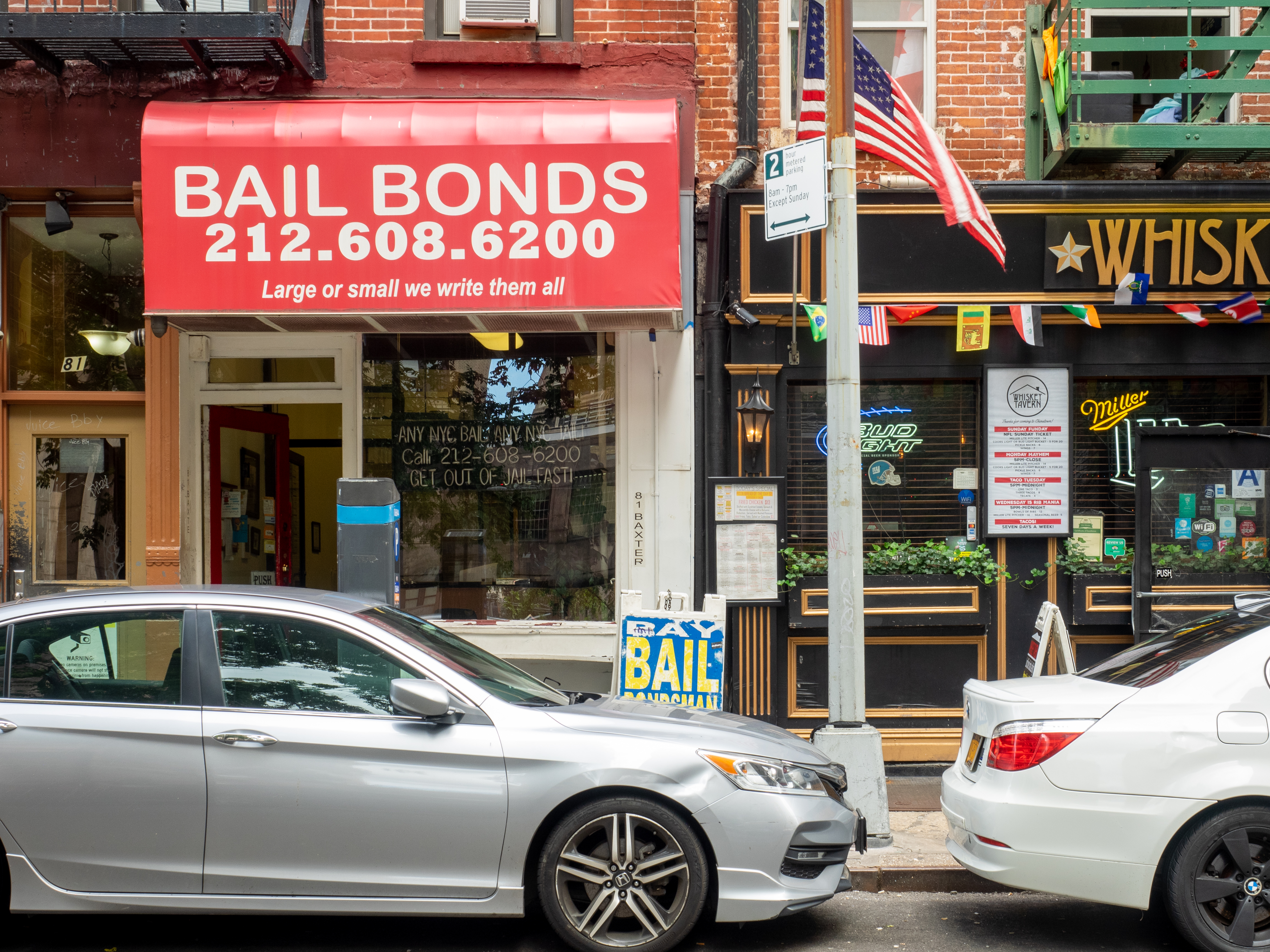
Bail bondsman located near the New York City Criminal Court in Manhattan, New York City

Even if it is eventually refunded, producing the bail money is a huge expense to the defendant and their family. The United States is one of the few countries in the world that permit defendants to use a bail bondsman. In return for a non-refundable payment, the bail bondsman will pay the bail amount and receive it when the trial is over. Bail bonds are a profitable industry, making $20 million a year in profit according to a 2012 study. Bail reform campaigners have criticized the bail bond industry for profiting off poor defendants and for creating perverse incentives by involving a for-profit industry in the judicial process, which is related to wider criticism of the prison-industrial complex.

==== Attorney access ====
An attorney's ability to defend their client is greatly hampered when their client is placed in pretrial detainment. Jailed defendants are difficult to work with due to restricted access and visiting hours, and have minimal time with their attorneys when compared to those who are granted pretrial release. This lack of coordination between the attorney and defendant makes it impossible to craft a strong defense, given that the defendant will often lack witness coaching. Defense attorneys that specialize in criminal trial have gone as far as to say that pretrial detention limits a defendant's ability to exercise their constitutional rights.

==== Juror bias ====
In 2014, a study done over 975 New Jersey cases tracked a defendant's ability to set bail and the outcome of their trial, and concluded that pretrial detention adversely impacts the length of sentencing in cases of conviction. That is to say, within the same offense type, those unable to post bail received longer sentences than those able to. There have also been other studies that indicate that pretrial detainment sets the odds against the defendant, reducing their chance of acquittal. Attorneys attest that jurors are almost always aware of defendants' bail status, which creates an implicit bias against their client.

=== Inconsistency ===
The bail system is further criticized for being arbitrary in how it is applied. Legally, bail determination is based on four factors: seriousness of the crime, ties to the community, the flight risk posed by the defendant, and the danger posed by the defendant to the community. California Penal Code section 1269b provides an example of the factors courts are directed to consider.

In reality, bail determination may also take into account extraneous factors. Some studies have found judicial bias, where a defendant's race, class, or gender affect bail. A 1984 study found that when judges were given specific policy guidelines, people with similar convictions were given similar bail amounts. There is concern that great variability across judges yields variability in decisions for identical candidates. The reason for such disparity is that different judges may assign different weights to factors such as flight risk or community ties. This is an oft cited reason as to why bail reform is necessary, as ambiguity in the bail decision-making process may lead to unfair and disparate outcomes.

Even for bail determination based on the danger posed by the defendant to the community, critics note that the government's definition of "dangerous" defendants who may not be allowed to go on bail have a tendency not to be dangerous or avoid their hearings at all, suggesting that the definition is too wide and needs to be reformed.

There is reason to believe that a correlation exists between class status and bail decisions. Recent analysis of data taken from Florida bail hearings revealed that indigent defendants with public defenders were more likely to be denied bail when compared to those with retained (hired) counsel, but that when they were awarded bail, it was set lower. Several suggested explanations for this result include higher skill level of retained counsel and prison overcrowding. Many prison systems face overcrowding in the modern area of mass incarceration, and setting unusually low bails appear to be the judge's way of relieving pressure for local prisons.

=== Effect on trials ===
Moreover, a court's decision to grant or deny bail has a direct impact on the outcome of a criminal case. Incarcerated defendants are significantly less able to prepare a legal defense compared with someone on bail who is unrestricted or perhaps conditionally restricted to home confinement. They are also unable to arrange meetings with suspected witnesses, and/or provide their attorney with important information about the case, thus creating logistical barriers. Furthermore, the paper finds that because more defendants are now less likely to be allowed a pretrial release, the prosecution's bargaining position is enhanced in plea negotiations, where incarcerated defendants are promised time off in exchange for their cooperation or plea of guilty. People that are denied bail are more likely to plead guilty whether or not they are actually guilty, and empirical research has found that pretrial detention can be particularly improperly coercive for people held on low-level charges, since their official sentences of incarceration would often be shorter than the time they are incarcerated pretrial Further, those denied bail and held pretrial are often sentenced to longer amounts of time than those who are granted pretrial release. In the juvenile justice context, being detained pretrial without bail has been found to have negative effects on downstream case outcomes such as dismissal, conviction, and sentencing, with the effects significantly harsher for Black youth than for their White and Hispanic counterparts.

=== Bias ===
Moreover, bail policies and bail decisions have been demonstrated to be applied disproportionately harmfully against black and Latino defendants, particularly males.

Test data from the bail bond market in New Haven, Connecticut, also shows the existence of discrimination based on race when bail is set for minority defendants. Specifically, black and Hispanic defendants generally received disproportionately high bail charges. In order to fight against racial discrimination, some suggest a "color-blind" bail solution that sets bail based on the average offender, regardless of race or gender.

== Reform ==
Bail reform generally refers to reform that aims to reduce or eliminate the use of cash bail.

The alternatives to cash bail include:

- Release without bail: Sometimes known as "release on recognizance" (ROR). The defendant is released with a pledge to appear in court and to not interfere with the judicial process. The only incentive they have to appear in court is the fact that failing to appear would be a criminal offense.
- Pretrial supervision: The defendant is released but subject to restrictions (such as electronic monitoring or house arrest).
- Compulsory detention: When cash bail has been abolished, it has led to more (but not most) defendants being detained without an offer of release through posting bail (if they could afford it). This is reserved for serious crimes, which would normally result in bail being too high for the defendant to pay unless they were wealthy.

=== Bail bond programs ===
In the 1960s, some volunteer bail reform projects emerged, advocating new pretrial services programs. For example, the Manhattan Bail Project was formed by the Vera Institute of Justice in 1961, to advance the theory that defendants with prominent ties to the community, such as a stable occupation or long marriage, could be confidently released on the strength of their promise to return. This concept was later termed release on recognizance (ROR). The New York city government eventually assumed oversight of the program, although the Vera Institute of Justice designed new ROR systems after defendants failed to appear. As of 2011, the Criminal Justice Agency (CJA) continues to provide ROR recommendations and oversee the status of released defendants.

Another reform program was the VISTA (Volunteers in Service to America) bail bond program, formed in Baltimore in 1968. The program defined a mathematical system to determine when a person charged with a crime was likely to voluntarily appear in court, such that the person might receive a personal recognizance bond. The system was organized around a point-based marker, where defendants earned points for positive merit and were deducted points for poor behavior.

A research program based in New York City tested the effects of a pretrial release agency and deposit bail. An analysis of the data accumulated over the course of the program indicated that the program was poorly executed by judges, and that bail reform initiatives were perceived by some judges as allowing preventive detention. In 2008, The New York Times wrote of the fees charged by bail bondsmen that "posting bail for people accused of crimes in exchange for a fee, is all but unknown in the rest of the world".

=== Abolition ===
As of March 2021, three states have abolished cash bail for the majority of court cases and one state has fully abolished cash bail starting January 2023. In 2014, New Jersey enacted reforms that took effect on January 1, 2017. All criminal defendants are now assessed with a point-based system to determine whether they should be released from custody, held in jail until trial, or subjected to alternative procedures (including house arrest, electronic monitoring, and, in limited cases, cash bail) to ensure public safety and the defendant's appearance in court. Alaska adopted a similar reform in 2016, which took effect in 2018. New York adopted a similar reform in early 2020, but this was largely rolled back in April of that year.

2020 California Proposition 25 vetoed the state legislature's proposed abolition of cash bail in the state.

In February 2021, Illinois became the first state to fully abolish cash bail. The SAFE-T Act was set to go into effect in January 2023, however a temporary stay was put in place on December 31, 2022. The law took effect in September 2023 after the Illinois Supreme Court ruled that the law is constitutional.

In March 2021, the California Supreme Court ruled that people cannot be detained simply because they cannot afford to pay cash bail.

=== Other proposals ===
Some reform proposals focus on not abolishing cash bail but reforming it. These include giving guidelines to judges or mandatory instructions to make sure cash bail is set in a more consistent way. The second solution, however, presents a problem in that it reduces the justice system's flexibility, and loses humanity. Many reformists prefer a more individualized bail procedure, citing the importance of considering circumstances and how no set of guidelines can adequately and fairly address every possible scenario. Fixing outcome disparity while retaining judicial flexibility remains a paradox that bail reformists have yet to solve, and is a point where many activists diverge. Another solution is to pass federal laws. This would mean amending the Bail Reform Act of 1984 to explicitly require courts to take into account a defendant's economic status.

In states where no reform has yet been acted, some organizations provide not-for-profit bail bonds to allow poor defendants to be released pre-trial.

Those who support decarceration in the United States want to abolish pretrial detention and restrictions entirely. This proposal is closely tied to the prison abolition movement.

=== Opposition ===
Bail reform may be difficult to implement because judicial officers may not want to take the risk of releasing an arrestee pretrial who may not show up for his trial, or may commit an additional crime while released pending trial, consequences for which the public might blame the judicial officer. Following the Waukesha Christmas parade attack, conservative commentators have highlighted the fact that Brooks was released on $1,000 bail two weeks prior to the attack, linking his case to nationwide bail reform efforts.

== See also ==
- Bail fund
- Bail bondsman
- 2019 New York bail reform
