= Bail =

Conditional release of a defendant with the promise to appear in court

Bail is a set of pre-trial restrictions that are imposed on a person charged with a criminal offence to ensure that they will not hamper the judicial process. Court bail may be offered to secure the conditional release of a defendant with the promise to appear in court when required. In some countries, especially the United States, bail sometimes includes a deposit of money or some form of property to the court by the person charged with an offence in return for the release from pre-trial detention. If the defendant does not return to court, the money is forfeited and the defendant may face additional criminal charges, such as failure to appear. If the defendant makes all their required appearances, the money is returned after the trial is concluded.

In other countries, such as the United Kingdom, bail is more likely to consist of a set of restrictions that the defendant will have to abide by for a set period of time. Under this usage, bail can be given both before and after charge. Bail offered before charge is known as pre-charge or police bail, to secure the defendant's release under investigation.

For minor crimes, a defendant may be summoned to court without the need for bail, or may be released on recognizance (promising to appear in court, with no bail required) following arraignment. For serious crimes, or for defendants who are deemed likely to fail to turn up in court, they may be remanded (detained) while awaiting trial. A defendant is given bail in cases where remand is not justified but there is a need to provide an incentive for the defendant to appear in court. Bail amounts may vary depending on the type and severity of crime the defendant is charged with; practices for determining bail amounts vary.

== Worldwide ==
=== Australia ===
Bail laws in Australia are similar to the laws of New Zealand and Canada, but are different in each state. Each state holds that there is a prima facie entitlement to bail for most charges upon application by a defendant. However, there is an exception when the charges are especially serious, such as drug trafficking, family violence or murder. In such cases, there is no entitlement to bail, and it must be argued as to what circumstances exist that justify a grant of bail.

In Victoria, bail may be refused to a defendant who faces a more serious charge unless the defendant demonstrates compelling reasons why bail should be granted. Compelling reasons may generally be established by demonstrating that jail is an unlikely outcome for the charge, or that bail conditions can be imposed that make re-offending unlikely. In cases where a defendant is charged with murder, terrorism or offending with a moderately serious charge while on bail, to become eligible for bail the defendant must prove exceptional circumstances. Exceptional circumstances are difficult to demonstrate, but may arise as a consequence of significant delay in a criminal prosecution.

=== Canada ===
People charged with a criminal offence in Canada have a constitutional right to reasonable bail (referred to as "judicial interim release" in the Criminal Code) unless there is some compelling reason to deny it. These reasons can be related to the accused's likelihood to skip bail, or to public danger resulting from the accused being at large. The accused may be denied bail because the public confidence in the administration of justice may be disturbed by letting the individual go free pending the completion of the trial or passing of sentence. Sureties and deposits can be imposed, but are optional.

=== Czech Republic ===
Notable Czech bail cases
- Radovan Krejčíř
  - charged with fraud (2004)
  - bail denied, following Krejčíř's complaint bail set at CZK 40 million (~€1.6 million), then denied by appellate court following state prosecutor's complaint
- David Rath
  - charged with accepting bribe (2012)
  - bail set at CZK 14 million (~€560,000)
- Michal Hala
  - charged with accepting bribe (2012)
  - bail set at CZK 4 million (~€160,000), but denied and returned by appellate court following prosecutor's complaint
- Randy Blythe
  - charged with intentionally inflicting bodily harm which resulted in death (i.e. manslaughter) (2012)
  - bail set at CZK 4 million, then doubled by appellate court following prosecutor's complaint
- Robert Rosenberg
  - charged with procuring prostitution, trafficking (2008)
  - bail set at CZK 600,000 (~€24,000)

Instead of remand, a court in the Czech Republic may decide to accept:

- a guaranty from a trustworthy person or association
- a written word of honor from the person charged
- surveillance by a probation officer
- bail

Bail can be considered when a charged person is held because of concern of possible escape or of a continuation of criminal activity. Bail cannot be considered where there is a concern of influencing witnesses or otherwise frustrating the proceedings. Bail is also excluded in case of 31 specified serious crimes (e.g. murder, grievous bodily harm, rape, robbery, public endangerment, etc.) when the person is held due to concern of continuation of criminal activity. Bail may be posted either by the charged person, or with his or her consent, by a third party, but this only after this third party has received a thorough briefing regarding the charges and reasons for custody and possible grounds for the forfeiture of the bail.

After the bail has been posted, the court must again review the grounds for bail, and must decide either to accept or refuse the bail. When accepting the bail, the court may also require the charged person to stay in the country.

The court may decide to rescind the bail if the charged person

- escapes, is in hiding or fails to report a change of address and thus frustrates the possibility of delivery of summons or other documents from the court, the prosecution or the police, or
- is at fault for failing to appear for a proceeding, which may not take part without him or her, or
- continues criminal activity, or attempts to finish the crime which they had attempted or threatened previously, or
- is evading execution of imprisonment sentence, court-ordered fine or other court-ordered punishment.

The court holds out on bail as long as the reasons for custody remain (which includes pending of the charges), and in case of conviction until the convict starts serving prison sentence, reimburses the criminal proceedings and/or pays court-ordered fine. In case that the court decided also on damages and the aggrieved party asks for it within three months, the bail or its part may be used also to reimburse the damages. Otherwise, the court returns the bail.

Both the prosecutor and the person in custody may challenge any decision on custody (including bail) by filing a complaint which leads to review by an appellate court.

=== Denmark ===
The possibility of posting bail is mentioned in passing in § 71, part 3, of the constitution of Denmark.

Anyone who is arrested must be put before a judge within 24 hours. If the arrestee cannot immediately be released, the judge must issue a decision, accompanied by grounds, as soon as possible and at the latest within three days, as to whether he is to be jailed, and, if he may be released against guaranty, determine the kind and size hereof. In the case of Greenland, this decision may be deviated from by law, insofar as it must be seen as required by spatial circumstances.

The possibility is further established in Retsplejeloven (the law relating to the administration of justice) § 765:

If the requirements for the use of pre-trial detention are present, but the purpose of the detention may be achieved by less invasive measures, the court, with the consent of the charged, makes a decision about a substitute for pre-trial detention.
Part 2. The court may thus decide, that the charged must (...) supply an economic guaranty for his presence at the court meeting and the carrying-out of any sentencing.

However, the practice is rarely used. For example, there were seven instances during the period 1973–1987.

=== France ===
In France, bail may be ordered by the examining magistrate or the judge of freedoms and detention within the framework of judicial control in French law (before the trial). It guarantees:

- The representation of the indicted person, the accuser or the accused in all the acts of the procedure and for the execution of the judgment, as well as, if necessary, the execution of the other obligations which were imposed on them. This part is restored if the person under examination has presented themselves to all the acts of the procedure, satisfied the obligations of the judicial control and submitted to the execution of the judgment;
- A payment in the order defined below. This part is returned in the event of dismissal in French criminal proceedings.

=== India ===
Indian law stresses the principles of presumption of innocence. The principle embodies freedom from arbitrary detention and serves as a bulwark against punishment before conviction. More importantly, it prevents the State from successfully employing its vast resources to cause greater damage to an un-convicted accused than he/she can inflict on society. While considering bail applications of the accused, courts are required to balance considerations of personal liberty with public interest. Accordingly, the granting of bail should be the rule rather than the exception. The Supreme Court has laid down in its judgements,

Personal liberty, deprived when bail is refused, is too precious a value of our constitutional system recognized under Article 21 that the crucial power to negate it is a great trust exercisable, not casually but judicially, with lively concern for the cost to the individual and community. To glamorize impressionistic orders as discretionary may, on occasions, make a litigation gamble decisive of a fundamental right. After all, the personal liberty of an accused or convict is fundamental, suffering lawful eclipse only in terms of procedure established by law.

The courts have also held that foreign nationals cannot be deprived of the right to seek bail. The Delhi High Court observed,

Law does not permit any differentiation between Indian Nationals and Foreign citizens in the matter of granting bail. What is permissible is that, considering the facts and circumstances of each case, the court can impose different conditions which are necessary to ensure that the accused will be available for facing the trial. It cannot be said that an accused will not be granted bail because he is a foreign national.

The Code of Criminal Procedure, 1973 does not define bail, although the terms bailable offence and non-bailable offence have been defined in section 2(a) of the Code. A Bailable offence is defined as an offence which is shown as bailable in the First Schedule of the Code or which is made bailable by any other law, and non-bailable offence means any other offence. A person who is arrested for a 'bailable' offence may secure bail at the police station, while those who fail to secure police bail and those arrested for non-bailable offences have to secure bail in court.

Sections 436 to 450 set out the provisions for the grant of bail and bonds in criminal cases. The amount of security that is to be paid by the accused to secure his release has not been mentioned in the code. Thus, it is left to the discretion of the court to put a monetary cap on the bond. The Supreme Court of India has delivered several cases wherein it has reiterated that the basic rule is – bail and not jail. One such instance came in State of Rajasthan, Jaipur v. Balchand alias Baliay which the Supreme Court decided on 20 September 1977, and held that the basic rule is bail, not jail, except where there are circumstances suggestive of fleeing from justice or thwarting the course of justice or creating other troubles in the shape of repeating offences or intimidating witnesses and the like by the petitioner who seeks enlargement on bail from the court. The bench of Krishnaiyer, V.R. had observed that when considering the question of bail, the gravity of the offence involved and the heinousness of the crime which are likely to induce the petitioner to avoid the course of justice must weigh with the court. Taking into consideration the facts of the case the apex court held that the circumstances and the social milieu do not militate against the petitioner being granted bail.

When a person accused of a crime is arrested, his statement is recorded and information such as the name, residence address, birthplace, charges filed are noted. The police officer may also check back the criminal record if any in the police station and ask for fingerprints to file a case against the accused. Under the Code of Criminal Procedure 1973 (First Schedule), offences have been classified as "bailable" and "non-bailable" offences. In the case of bailable offences, if the accused produces proper surety, and fulfils other conditions, it is binding upon the Investigating officer to grant bail. However, in case of a non-bailable offence, the police cannot grant bail; it can only be granted by a judicial magistrate/judge. The Investigating Officer must produce the accused before the judicial magistrate/judge concerned within 24 hours of his arrest. At that time, the accused has a right to apply for bail. Depending upon the facts of the case, the judge decides whether bail should be granted. If bail is granted the accused must deposit money with the court. Generally, for lesser crimes, a standard amount is asked to be deposited for awarding the bail.

There are some conditions put under section 437 of the Cr.P.C. wherein bail can be requested even for a non-bailable offence. In non-bailable cases, bail is not the right of the accused, but the discretion of the judge if regards the case as fit for the grant of bail, it regards imposition of certain conditions as necessary in the circumstances. Section 437(3) elaborates the conditions set by the law to get bail in non-bailable offences. The sub-section says that when a person accused or suspected of the commission of an offense punishable with imprisonment which may extend to seven years or more or of an offense under Chapter VI, Chapter XVI or Chapter XVII of the Indian Penal Code (45 of 1860) or abatement of, or conspiracy or attempt to commit, any such offense, is released on bail under sub-section (1). However, for that, the Court has the power to impose any condition which it considers necessary. Some conditions that the court may place while granting bail are to ensure that such person shall attend in accordance with the conditions of the bond executed under this Chapter, or to ensure that such person shall not commit an offence similar to the offence of which they are accused or of the commission of which they are suspected, or otherwise in the interests of justice.

=== Ireland ===
In Ireland, bail (Irish: bannaí, from Old Norse band, "binding") is when a person enters a written bond (recognisance), committing to appear before the court to answer the charges made against them. A person may be required to lodge money as part of their bail. A surety is a person who makes themselves responsible for a defendant coming to court. They promise to pay a sum of money to the court if the defendant does not appear as agreed; however, commercial bail bonding as in the U.S. is illegal.

There are three kinds of bail:

- Station bail: set by a Garda Síochána. A common condition is that the defendant must report to his/her local Garda station once or several times a day.
- Court bail: set by the judge in the District Court. The defendant (or his/her surety) must pay the court at least one-third of the amount of money promised in the bail bond.
- High Court bail: if the defendant is charged with a very serious crime, only the High Court can grant bail.

In People (AG) v O'Callaghan (1966), the Irish Supreme Court had ruled that the provisions of Article 40.4 of the Irish Constitution, which guarantees personal liberty and the principle of habeas corpus, meant that an individual charged with a crime could only be refused bail if they were likely to flee or to interfere with witnesses or evidence. The Sixteenth Amendment of the Constitution of Ireland, approved by referendum in 1996, provided that a court could refuse bail to a person charged with a serious offence where it feared that while at liberty they would commit a serious offence. The Bail Act 1997 was passed by the Oireachtas the following year, and it governs bail in the Republic.

=== New Zealand ===
In New Zealand, those charged with a criminal offence have a right to be released on bail with reasonable terms and conditions, unless there is a good reason for continuing to be held in custody.

When one is arrested the police decide whether to grant the person bail until their court date. After that the courts will have discretion whether to grant bail again, if the case is not resolved at the first court appearance.

When considering granting bail, the police and courts take into consideration factors such as: the persons likelihood of showing up to court, the nature of the offence, the persons past conduct, whether the person will offend again while out on bail, and the risk of evidence/witnesses being tampered with. Certain offences (such as violence, drug-dealing, or repeat offenders) automatically disqualify persons from being granted bail. People who have previously breached their bail or the conditions associated with it are less likely to be granted bail again.

=== United Kingdom ===
==== England and Wales ====
In the modern English bail system, monetary payments play a very small role. Securities and sureties can be taken as conditions for being granted bail, but these amounts are not excessive. Wider restrictions such as curfews, electronic monitoring, presenting at a police station, and limits on meeting specific people or going to specific places are more common conditions.

Bail is regulated primarily by the Bail Act 1976 and the Police and Criminal Evidence Act 1984, both of which have been heavily amended by later legislation such as the Policing and Crime Act 2017.

The Bail Act 1976 was enacted with the aims of creating more conditions by which defendants could be denied bail and also redefining the parameters of fulfilling bail. The Bail Act also nullified the recognizance system, removing the requirement of paying a specific amount of money and instead arresting defendants for failing to surrender. The Bail Act created a qualified right to be granted bail before conviction, except for when certain factors applied. This does not guarantee a person will get bail, but it places the onus on the prosecution to demonstrate why bail should be refused in preference to custody.

In England and Wales there are three types of bail that can be given:

- Police bail. A suspect is released without being charged but must return to the police station at a stated time. Normally this is limited to 28 days.
- Police to court. After being charged, the charged person is given bail but must attend their first court hearing at the date and Court stated.
- Court bail. After a court hearing, a charged person is granted bail pending further investigation or while the case continues.

==== Scotland ====
Bail can be granted by any of the courts of Scotland, with the final decision in solemn proceedings being with the High Court of Justiciary. All crimes are bailable, and bail should be granted to any accused person "except where there is good reason for refusing bail". The Bail, Judicial Appointments etc. (Scotland) Act 2000, an Act of the Scottish Parliament, had removed the previous restrictions on bail that meant that murder and treason were not ordinarily bailable. However, a person could be bailed when accused of these crimes on application of the Lord Advocate or by a decision of the High Court itself. The Criminal Proceedings etc. (Reform) (Scotland) Act 2007 reintroduced restrictions on the granting of bail by requiring exceptional circumstances to be shown when a person is accused of a violent, sexual or drugs offence, and they have a prior conviction for a similar offence.

In Scotland, the focus is normally for those who are opposed to bail to convince the courts that bail should not be granted, with the procurator fiscal given guidance to use the nature and gravity of an offence as grounds to oppose bail.

A person who is refused bail can appeal against the refusal to either the Sheriff Appeal Court for summary proceedings in the Sheriff Courts and Justice of the Peace Courts and solemn proceedings in the Sheriff Courts, or to the High Court of Justiciary when a case is on trial there. The High Court of Justiciary has final authority to decide all bail decisions, and will decide on bail appeals for cases before the High Court on first instance. A Procurator Fiscal or Advocate Depute can request the High Court to review any bail decision where they believe that bail should not have been granted.

=== United States ===
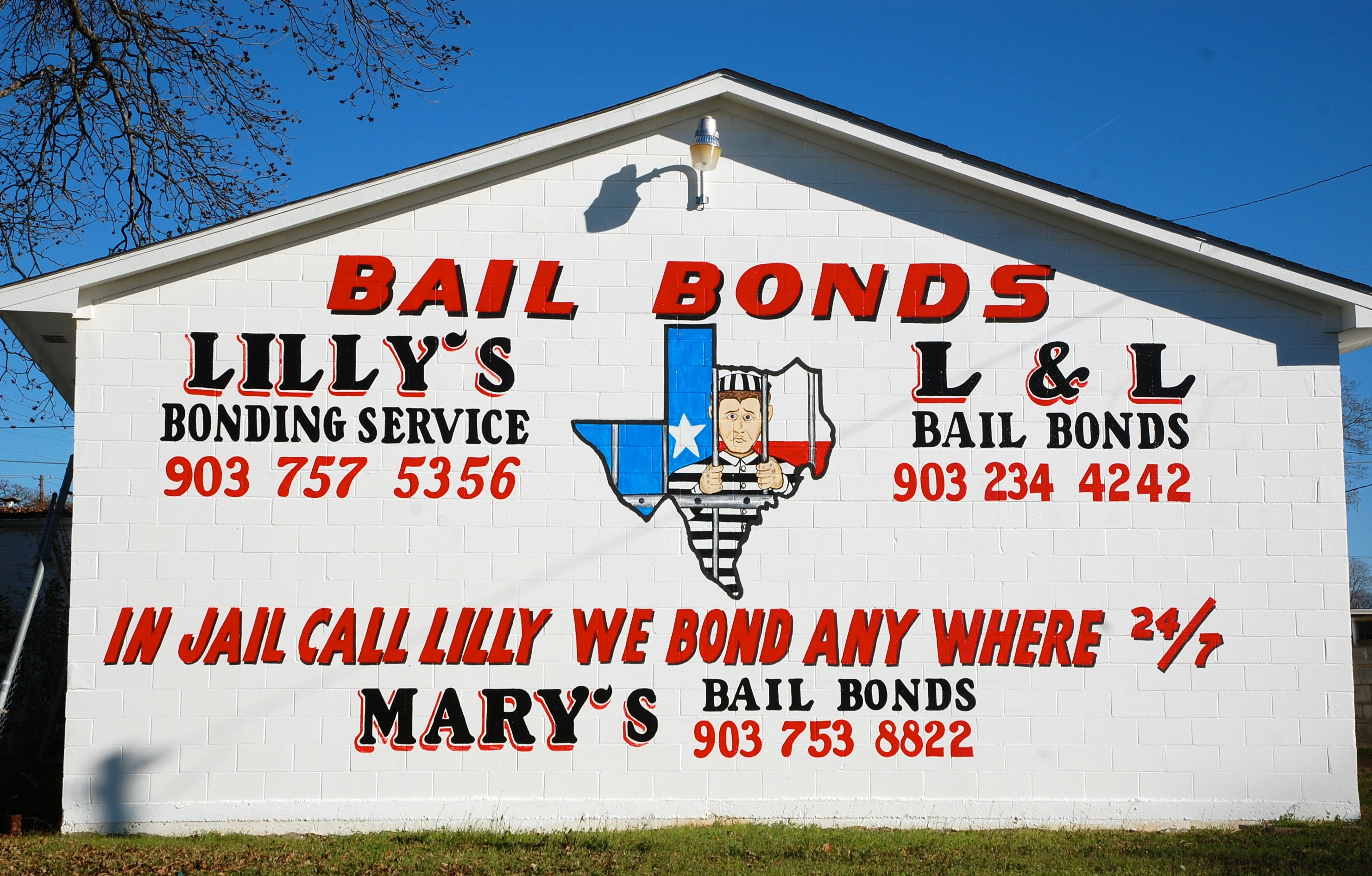
Bail bondsman in Longview, Texas.

The 8th Amendment to the United States Constitution states, "Excessive bail shall not be required", thus establishing bail as a constitutionally protected right. What constitutes "excessive" is a matter of judicial discretion, and bail can be denied if the judge feels that it will not aid in forcing the accused back to trial. Money bail is the most common form of bail in the United States and the term "bail" often specifically refers to such a deposit, but other forms of pre-trial release are permitted; this varies by state.

Many states have a "bail schedule" that lists the recommended bail amount for a given criminal charge. At the first court appearance (the arraignment), the judge can set the bail at the amount listed on the schedule or at a different amount based on the specific facts of the crime and the person accused.

A common criticism of bail in the United States is that the likelihood of a person charged with an offence being released is significantly affected by their economic status and systemic racial bias. Once detained pretrial, these economically disadvantaged people have been shown to experience conditions in jails that improperly induce guilty pleas (whether or not they are factually or legally guilty). In response, in 2014 New Jersey and Alaska abolished cash bail for all but a limited number of court cases; and in 2023, Illinois abolished cash bail. Though the California legislature attempted to eliminate cash bail in 2018, this change was vetoed by California Proposition 25 in November 2020. In 2019, New York passed bail reform legislation that took effect on 1 January 2020, eliminating cash bail for many misdemeanor and non-violent felony charges. However, this law was later narrowed by the governor due to public pushback led by prosecutors and law enforcement officials.

==== Bail bond ====
In the United States, it is common for bail to be a cash (or other property) deposit. Cash bail in other countries is more limited. Known as a bail bond or cash bail, an amount of money is posted so that the person charged with an offence can be released from pre-trial detention. Unless posted by a bail bondsman, this deposit is refunded if the person makes all of their required court appearances.

In 46 US states, a commercial bail bondsman can be paid to deposit bail money on behalf of a detained individual. This practice is mostly illegal in the rest of the world. In Germany, the use of bail bondsmen is legal if the court allows it in its decision to grant cash bail. Illinois, Kentucky, Oregon, and Wisconsin have outlawed commercial bail bonds, while New Jersey and Alaska rarely permit money bail.

== See also ==
- 2019 New York bail reform
- Bounty hunters
- Mainprise
- Seabury Commission
