= List of UC Berkeley School of Law alumni =

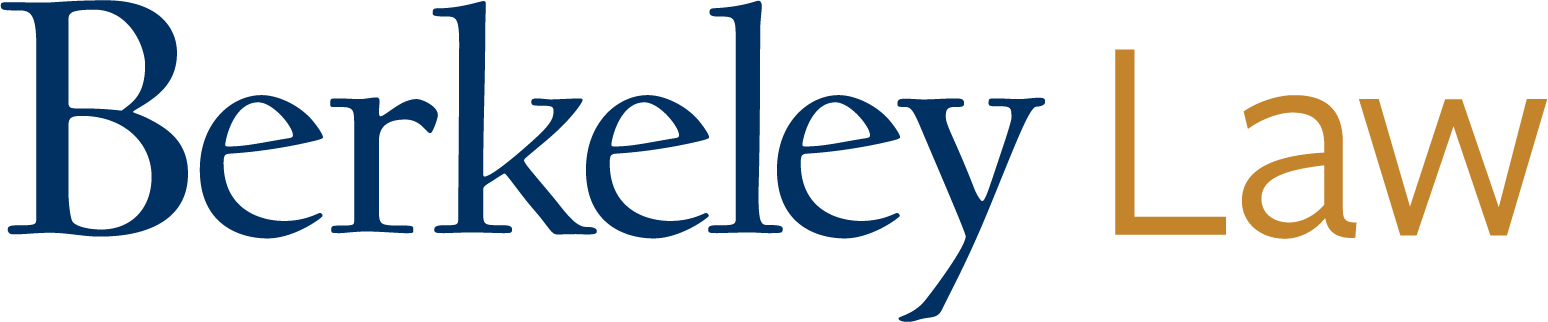

UC Berkeley School of Law has produced many influential alumni in law, government, business, academia and society.

The following are prominent alumni of Berkeley Law. Within each category below, alumni are listed by their graduation date from the law school. Alumni may appear more than once if they hold or have held roles that encompass multiple categories. Individuals were conferred with J.D. or LL.B. degrees unless otherwise noted in parentheses.

== United States government and politics ==
The following are Berkeley Law graduates who have served in prominent federal, state, and local government positions and/or important political roles.

=== Federal government ===
==== United States Cabinet and Executive Council ====
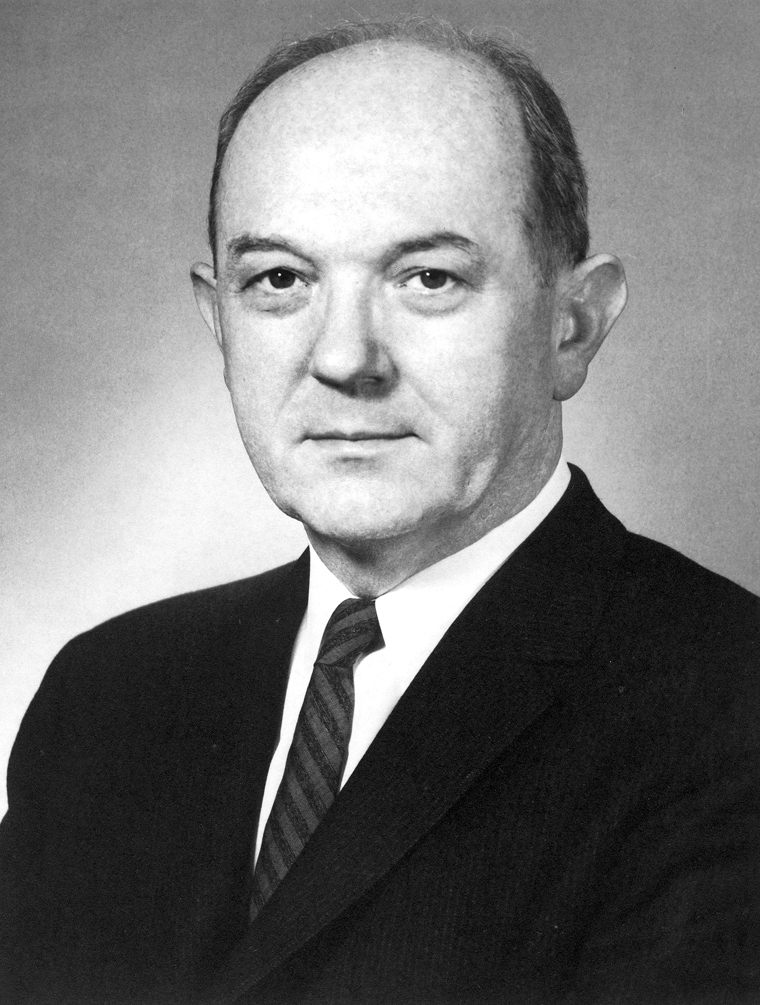
Dean Rusk '40, 54th U.S. Secretary of State

- Dean Rusk, 1940 – 54th United States Secretary of State (1961–1969)

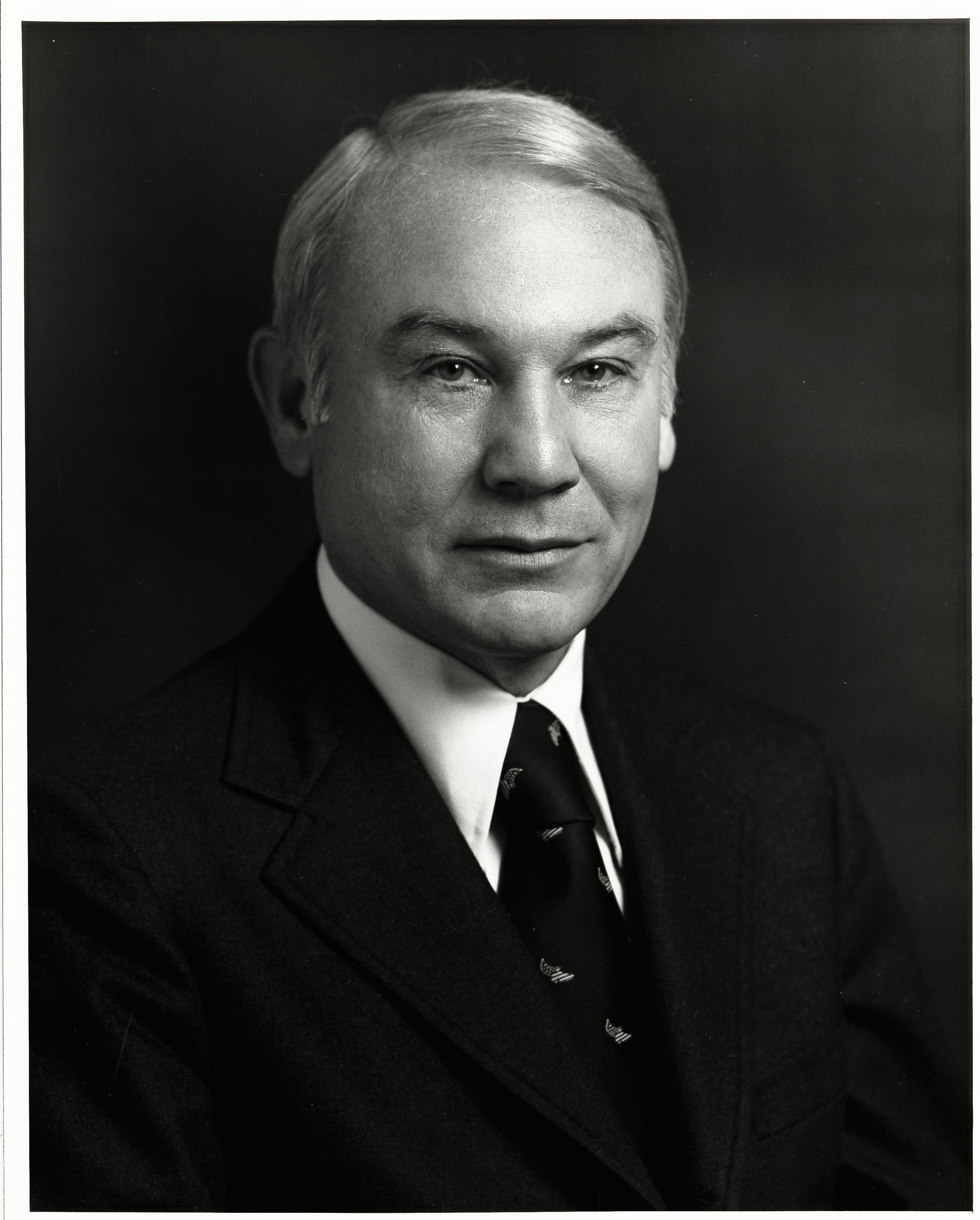
G. William Miller '52, 65th U.S. Secretary of the Treasury and 11th Chair of the Federal Reserve

- G. William Miller, 1952 – 65th United States Secretary of the Treasury (1979–1981) and 11th Chairman of the Federal Reserve (1978–1979)
- Edwin Meese III, 1958 – 75th United States Attorney General (1985–1988) and Counselor to the President (1981–1985)
- Neil Goldschmidt, 1967 – 6th United States Secretary of Transportation (1979–1981)
- Kenneth Wainstein, 1988 – 4th United States Homeland Security Advisor (2008–2009)
- Robert O'Brien, 1991 – 28th United States National Security Advisor (2019–2021)

==== United States Congress ====
===== Senators =====
- Pete Wilson, 1962 – United States Senator from California (1983–1991)
- Peter Welch, 1973 – United States Senator from Vermont (2023–)

===== Representatives =====
- Frederick C. Loofbourow, 1896 – member of the U.S. House of Representatives from Utah (1930–1933)
- Ralph R. Eltse, 1912 – member of the U.S. House of Representatives from California (1933–1935)
- Albert E. Carter, 1913 – member of the U.S. House of Representatives from California (1925–1945)
- J. Leroy Johnson, 1915 – member of the United States House of Representatives from California (1943–1957)
- Thomas Werdel, 1936 – member of the United States House of Representatives from California (1949–1953)
- Robert Condon, 1938 – member of the United States House of Representatives from California (1953–1955)
- John J. McFall, 1941 – House Majority Whip (1973–1977), member of the U.S. House of Representatives from California (1957–1978)
- John F. Baldwin, Jr., 1949 – member of the United States House of Representatives from California (1955–1966)
- Robert Leggett, 1950 – member of the United States House of Representatives from California (1963–1979)
- Thomas Gill, 1951 – member of the U.S. House of Representatives from Hawaii (1963–1965)
- Jerome Waldie, 1953 – member of the U.S. House of Representatives from California (1966–1975)
- Eni Faleomavaega, 1973 (LL.M.) – delegate to the U.S. House of Representatives from American Samoa (1989–2015)
- Peter Welch, 1973 – member of the United States House of Representatives from Vermont (2007–2023)
- Frank Tejeda, 1974 – member of the United States House of Representatives from Texas (1993–1997)

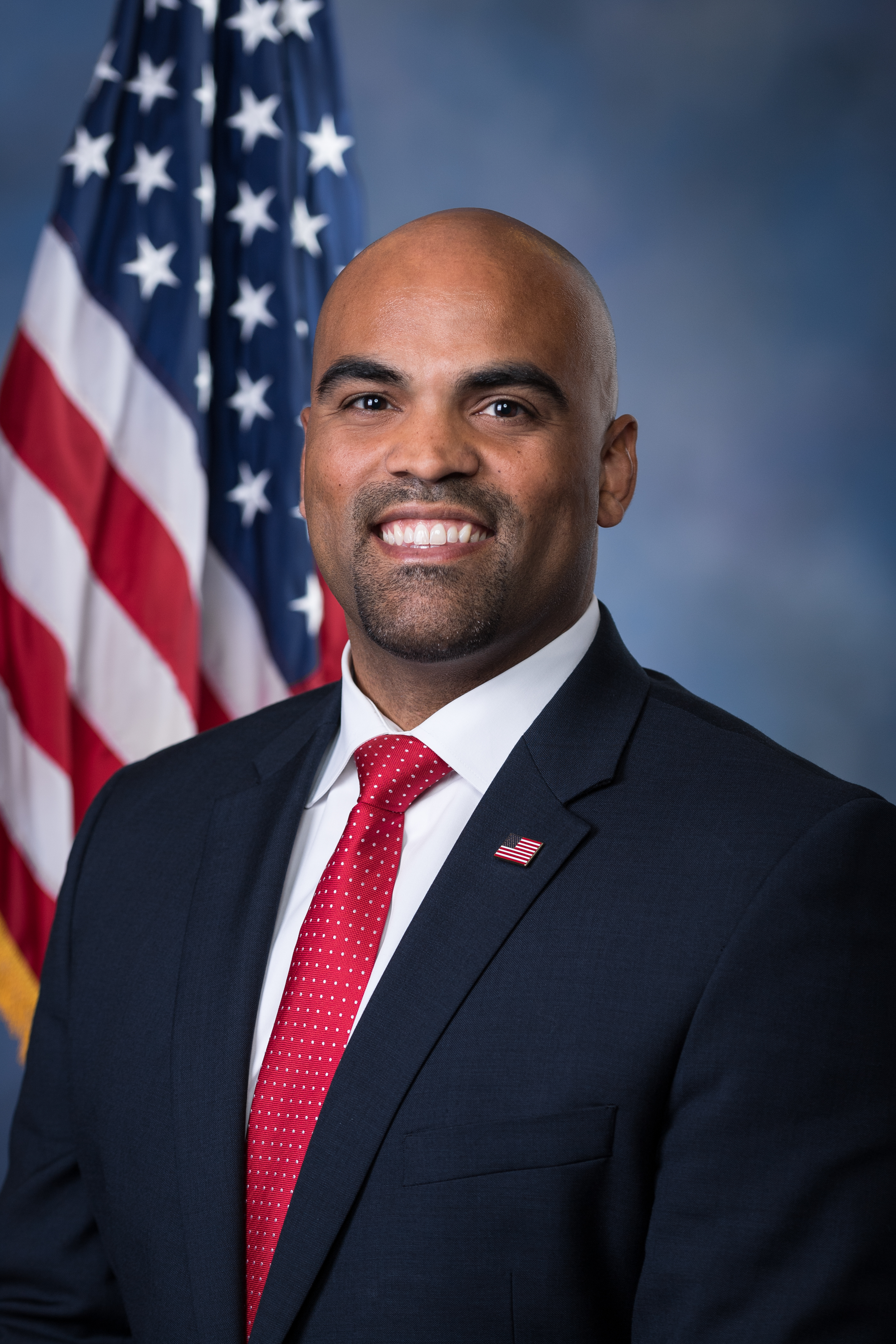
Colin Allred '14, U.S. Representative from Texas

- Colin Allred, 2014 – member of the United States House of Representatives from Texas (2018–)

===== Notable congressional staff =====
- Douglas Letter, 1978 – general counsel of the United States House of Representatives (2019–)
- Victoria Nourse, 1984 – counsel to the United States Senate Judiciary Committee (1990–1993) and a United States Committee to Investigate the Iran-Contra Affair (1987)
- Uttam Dhillon, 1987 – chief counsel and deputy staff director of the United States House Committee on Homeland Security (2003–2006), policy director of the House Republican Policy Committee (2002), and senior investigative counsel of the United States House Committee on Oversight and Reform (1997–1998)
- Linda Menghetti, 1990 – Chief Democratic (Minority) Trade Counsel in the United States Senate Committee on Finance (2000, counsel 1996–2000)
- Jelena McWilliams, 2002 – chief counsel and deputy staff director for the United States Senate Committee on Banking, Housing, and Urban Affairs (2015–2016)
- Ann O'Leary, 2005 – legislative director for Senator Hillary Clinton (2001–2003)
- Henry Stern, 2009 – former counsel for the House Energy and Commerce Committee

==== Department of Justice ====
- Annette Abbott Adams, 1912 – Assistant U.S. Attorney General (1920–1921); first woman to serve in this role
- Francis C. Whelan, 1932 – United States Attorney for the Southern District of California (1961–1964)
- John Michael Doar, 1949 – Assistant U.S. Attorney General for the Civil Rights Division (1960–1967)
- D. Lowell Jensen, 1952 – 21st United States Deputy Attorney General (1985–1986), United States Associate Attorney General (1983–1985), United States Assistant Attorney General for the Criminal Division (1981–1983)

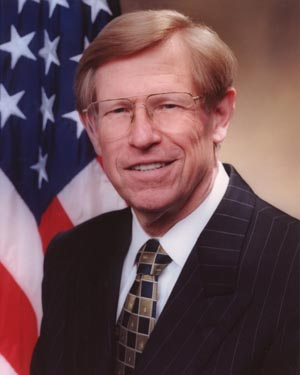
Theodore Olson '65, 42nd Solicitor General of the United States

- Theodore Olson, 1965 – 42nd Solicitor General of the United States (2001–2004)
- Billy Hunter, 1971 – United States Attorney for the Northern District of California (1977–1981)
- Douglas Letter, 1978 – director of the Civil Division Appellate Staff, associate counsel to President Bill Clinton, deputy associate attorney general, and senior counselor to Attorney General Eric Holder
- Bonnie S. Klapper, 1982 – notable Assistant United States Attorney for the Central District of California and the Eastern District of New York (1984–2012)
- Harry Litman, 1986 – United States Attorney for the Western District of Pennsylvania (1998–2001), Deputy Assistant U.S. Attorney General (1993–1998), and Assistant U.S. Attorney for the Northern District of California (1989–1993) and the Eastern District of Virginia (1993–1998)
- Uttam Dhillon, 1987 – acting administrator, Drug Enforcement Administration (2018–2020)

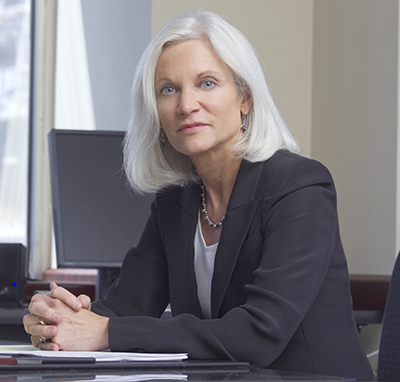
Melinda Haag '87, former U.S. Attorney for the Northern District of California

- Melinda Haag, 1987 – United States Attorney for the Northern District of California (2010–2017)
- Karin Immergut, 1987 – United States Attorney for the District of Oregon (2003–2009)
- Kenneth Wainstein, 1988 – United States Assistant Attorney General for the National Security Division (2006–2008) and United States Attorney for the District of Columbia (2004–2006)

==== Department of State ====
- John R. Phillips, 1969 – United States Ambassador to Italy (2013–2017), United States Ambassador to San Marino (2013–2017), and chair of the President's Commission on White House Fellowships (2009–2013)
- Michael Kozak, 1971 – noted diplomat who has served in various high-ranking roles in the U.S. Department of State since the 1970s; helped negotiate the Panama Canal Treaties and the Egypt-Israel, Nicaraguan Civil War, and Lebanese Civil War peace treaties; United States Ambassador to Belarus (2000–2003), Chief of the U.S. Interests Section in Havana (late 1990s), Acting Assistant Secretary of State for Western Hemisphere Affairs (2019–), Acting United States Special Envoy for Monitoring and Combating anti-Semitism (2012–2013), principal deputy Assistant Secretary of State for Inter-American Affairs, and senior advisory roles to the Assistant Secretary for Democracy, Human Rights and Labor
- Michael H. Posner, 1972 – Assistant Secretary of State for Democracy, Human Rights, and Labor (DRL) of the United States (2009–2013)

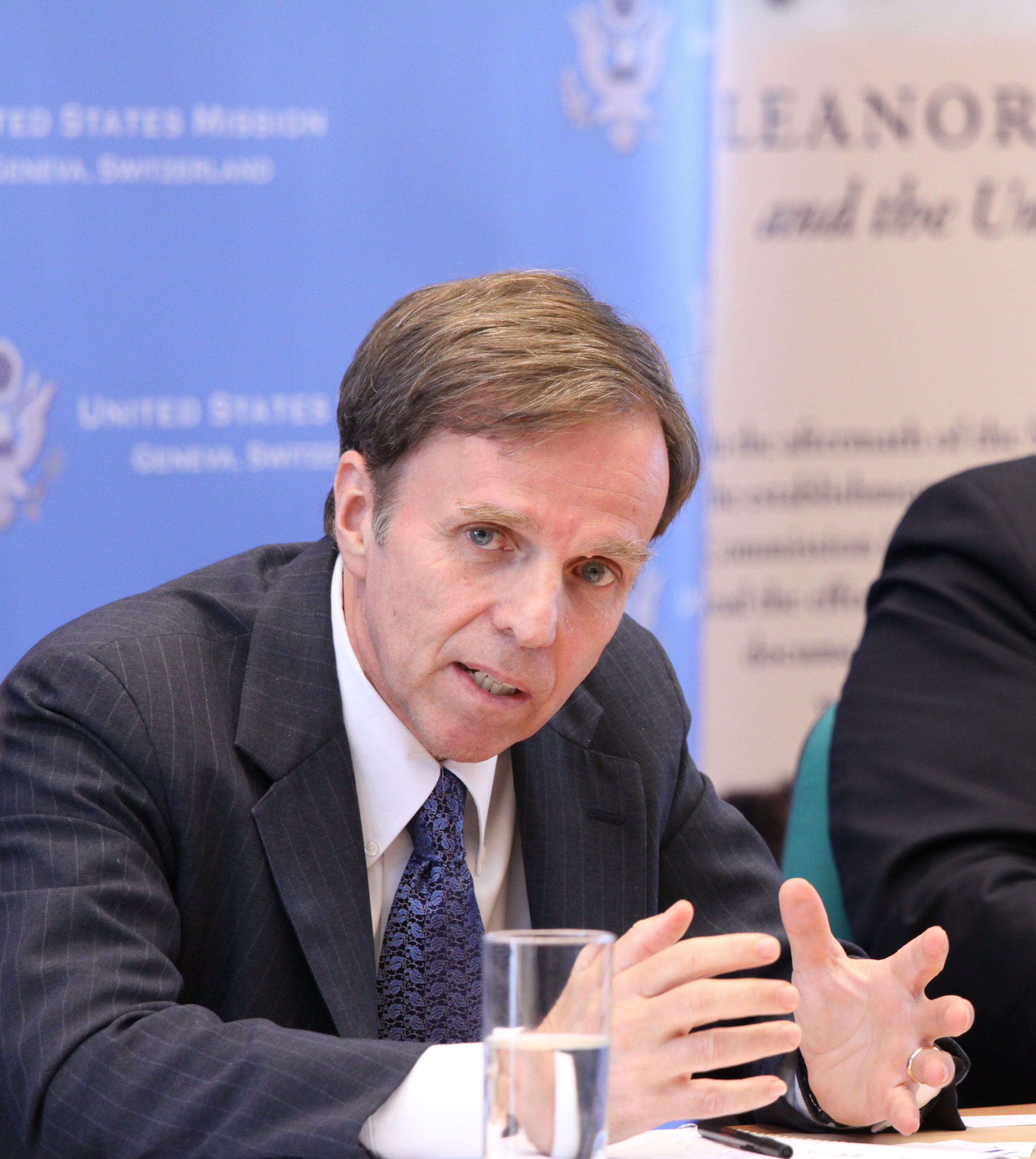
Michael Posner '72, former Assistant Secretary of State for Democracy, Human Rights, and Labor

- Daniel A. Clune, 1975 – United States Ambassador to Laos (2013–2016), Principal Deputy Assistant Secretary, Bureau of Oceans and International Environmental and Scientific Affairs (2010–2012), director of the U.S. State Department Office of Monetary Affairs (2005–2007), director of the U.S. State Department Office of Economic Policy and Public Diplomacy, deputy chief of mission and chargé d'affaires of the U.S. embassy in the Bahamas
- Frankie Reed, 1979 – United States Ambassador to Fiji, Kiribati, Nauru, Tonga and Tuvalu (2011–2015) and United States Consul in Melbourne, Australia (2015–)
- Robert S. Beecroft, 1988 – United States Ambassador to Egypt (2015–2017), United States Ambassador to Iraq (2012–2014), and United States Ambassador to Jordan (2008–2011)
- Jeff Bleich, 1989 – United States Ambassador to Australia (2009–2013)
- Robert O'Brien, 1991 – Special Envoy for Hostage Affairs (2018–2019) and co-chair of the Public-Private Partnership for Justice Reform in Afghanistan program (2007–2008)

==== Other federal departments and agencies ====
- Hugh S. Johnson, 1916 – administrator of the National Recovery Administration (1933–1934); served during the height of the Great Depression
- Mathew Tobriner, 1932 (J.S.D.) – chief attorney for the United States Department of Agriculture (1932–1936)
- Steven Walther, 1968 – vice chair of the Federal Election Commission (2020, commissioner 2008–)
- Michael Pack, 1970s – CEO and director of the U.S. Agency for Global Media (2020–2021), senior vice president of the Corporation for Public Broadcasting (2003–2006), and member of the National Council for the Humanities (2002–2005)
- Helane Morrison, 1984 – regional director of the United States Securities and Exchange Commission (1999–2007)
- Uttam Dhillon, 1987 – director of the Office of Counternarcotics Enforcement at the U.S. Department of Homeland Security (2006–2008)
- Kenneth Wainstein, 1988 – Under Secretary of Homeland Security for Intelligence and Analysis (2022–)
- David Kappos, 1990 – Undersecretary of Commerce for Intellectual Property and director of United States Patent and Trademark Office (2009–2013)
- Kenneth L. Marcus, 1991 – Assistant U.S. Secretary of Education for Civil Rights (2018–, 2003–2004), staff director for the U.S. Commission on Civil Rights (2004–2008), and General Deputy Assistant Secretary of Housing and Urban Development for Fair Housing and Equal Opportunity (2001–2004)
- Michael Mundaca, 1992 – Assistant Secretary of the Treasury for Tax Policy (2010–2011)

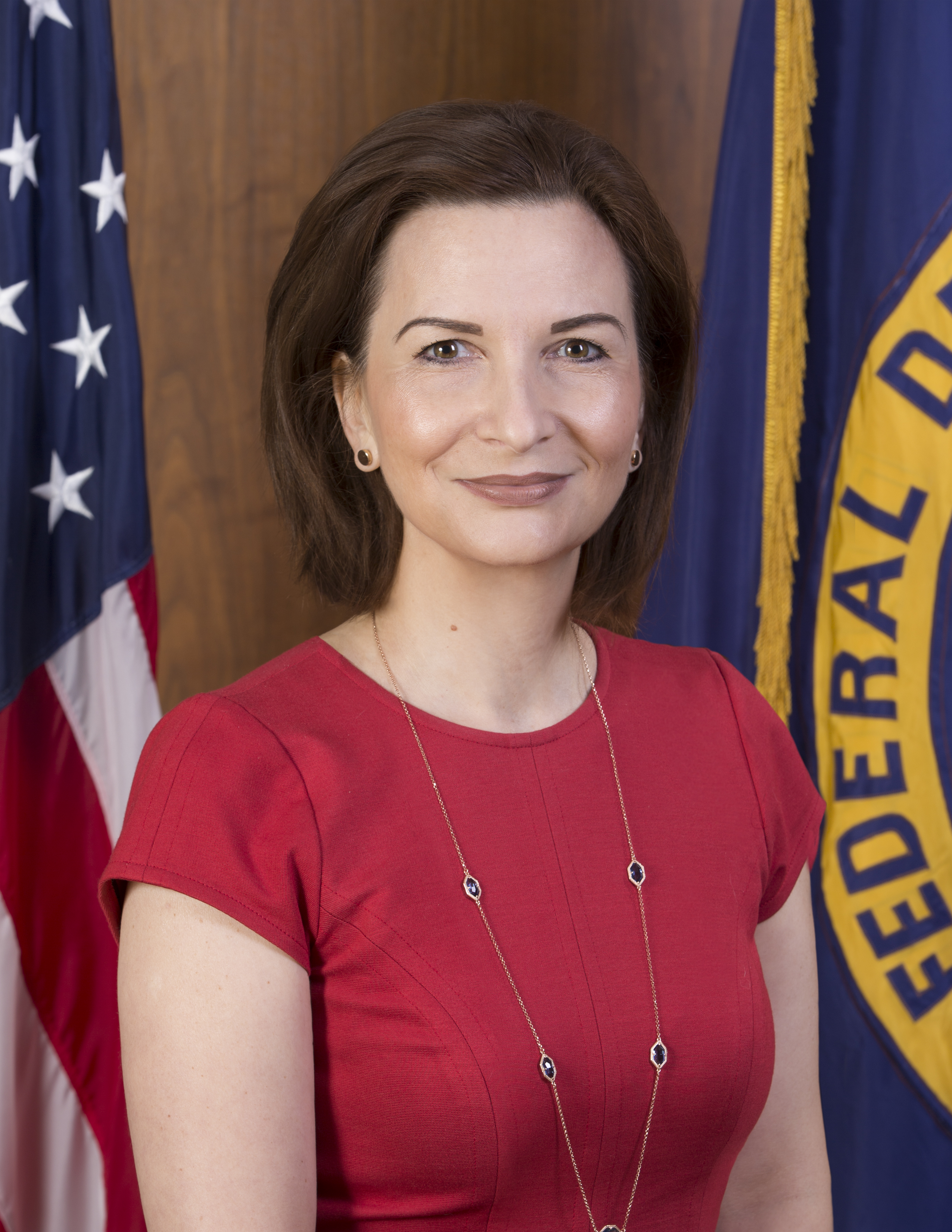
Jelena McWilliams '02, Chair of the Federal Deposit Insurance Corporation

- Jelena McWilliams, 2002 – chair of the Federal Deposit Insurance Corporation (2018–)
- Maya Rupert, 2006 – senior policy adviser to Secretary of Housing and Urban Development Julián Castro (2014–2017)

==== Executive staff ====
- Jerome Waldie, 1953 – executive director of the White House Conference on Aging (1980) and chair of the Federal Mine Safety and Health Review Commission (1978–1979)
- Richard L. Wright, 1960s – senior advisor on the task force that founded the Department of Energy during the Carter Administration
- Maria Echaveste, 1980 – deputy chief of staff to President Bill Clinton (1998–2001)
- Victoria Nourse, 1984 – counsel to Vice President Joe Biden (2014–2015)
- Jamie Fellner, 1990s – member of the National Prison Rape Elimination Commission (2004–2009)

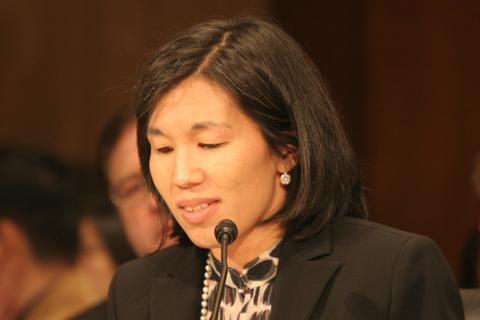
Nicole Wong '95, former Deputy Chief Technology Officer of the United States

- Howard Shelanski, 1992 – administrator of the Office of Information and Regulatory Affairs (2013–2017) and director of the Federal Trade Commission's Bureau of Economics (2012–2013)
- Nicole Wong, 1995 – Deputy Chief Technology Officer of the United States (2013–2014)
- Ann O'Leary, 2005 – advisor to President Barack Obama's transition team

=== State and territorial governments ===
==== Governors ====
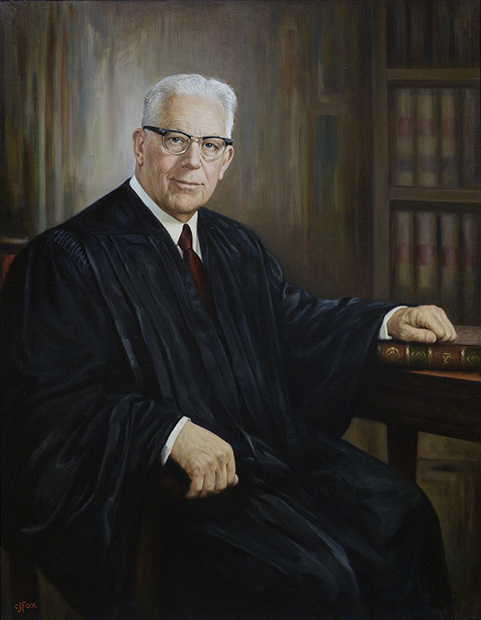
Earl Warren '14, 14th Chief Justice of the United States and 30th Governor of California

- Earl Warren, 1914 – 30th Governor of California (1943–1953)
- Walter Gordon, 1922 – 18th Governor of the United States Virgin Islands (1955–1958)
- Richard Lamm, 1961 – 38th Governor of Colorado (1975–1987)

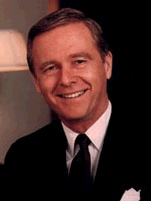
Pete Wilson '62, 36th Governor of California and former U.S. Senator for California

- Pete Wilson, 1962 – 36th Governor of California (1991–1999)
- Neil Goldschmidt, 1967 – 33rd Governor of Oregon (1987–1991)

==== State cabinet members ====
- Earl Warren, 1914 – 20th Attorney General of California (1939–1943)
- Thomas Gill, 1951 – 3rd Lieutenant Governor of Hawaii (1966–1970) and director of the Hawaii Office of Economic Opportunity (1965–1966)
- Richard L. Wright, 1960s – chief of staff to Governor of New Jersey Jim Florio
- David B. Frohnmayer, 1967 – 12th Attorney General of Oregon (1981–1991)
- Paul Bardacke, 1969 – 26th Attorney General of New Mexico (1983–1986)
- Eni Faleomavaega, 1973 (LL.M.) – 3rd Lieutenant Governor of American Samoa (1985–1989)
- David M. Louie, 1977 – 13th Attorney General of Hawaii (2011–2014)
- Kate Marshall, 1992 – 35th Lieutenant Governor of Nevada (2019–) and 21st Nevada State Treasurer (2007–2015)
- Jahna Lindemuth, 1997 – 31st Attorney General of Alaska (2016–2018)
- Sean Reyes, 1997 – 21st Attorney General of Utah (2013–)
- Jessica Wooley, 1997 – director of the Hawaii Office of Environmental Quality Control (2014–2015)
- Ann O'Leary, 2005 – chief of staff to Governor of California Gavin Newsom (2019–)

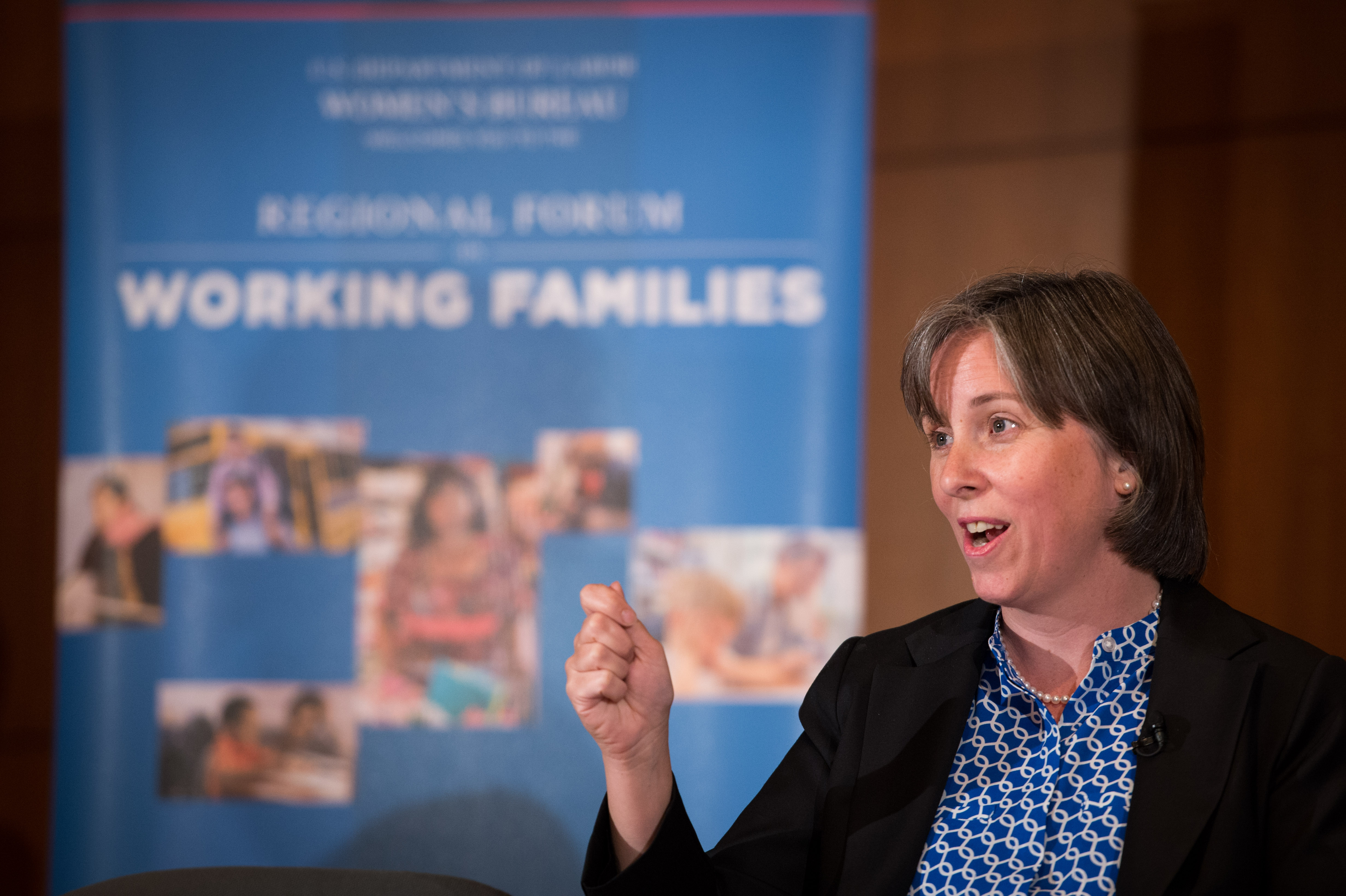
Ann O'Leary '05, Chief of Staff to the Governor of California

==== State and territorial legislators ====
- Selim M. Franklin, 1883 – member of the 13th Arizona Territorial Legislature (1885–1887); drafted legislation that founded the University of Arizona
- Albert Charles Wollenberg, 1924 – member of the California State Assembly (1939–1947)
- MacNeil Mitchell, 1929 – New York State Senator (1947–1964) and member of the New York State Assembly (1938–1946); chair of the New York State Senate Judiciary Committee; delegate to the 1960 and 1964 Republican Party National Conventions
- Thomas Werdel, 1936 – member of the California State Assembly (1943–1947); chair of the Judiciary Committee in the State Assembly
- Robert Condon, 1938 – member of the California State Assembly (1948–1952)
- Thomas W. Caldecott, 1939 – member, California State Assembly (1947–1967)
- John J. McFall, 1941 – member of the California State Assembly (1951–1956)
- John A. Nejedly, 1941 – California State Senator (1969–1980); chair of the California State Senate Committee on Natural Resources and Wildlife
- Melvin D. Close, Jr., 1950s – Speaker, Nevada General Assembly (1967–1968, member 1964–1970) and president pro tempore, Nevada Senate (1977 and 1981, state senator 1970–1982)
- Robert Leggett, 1950 – member of the California State Assembly (1961–1962)
- Thomas Gill, 1951 – member of the Hawaii House of Representatives (1959–1963)
- William Raggio, 1951 – Nevada State Senate Majority Leader (1987–1989 and 1993–2007; served as minority leader 1977–1979, 1983–86, in 1991 and in 2009; elected to the state senate 1972–2011); chair of the State Senate Finance Committee and the Legislative Committee on Education

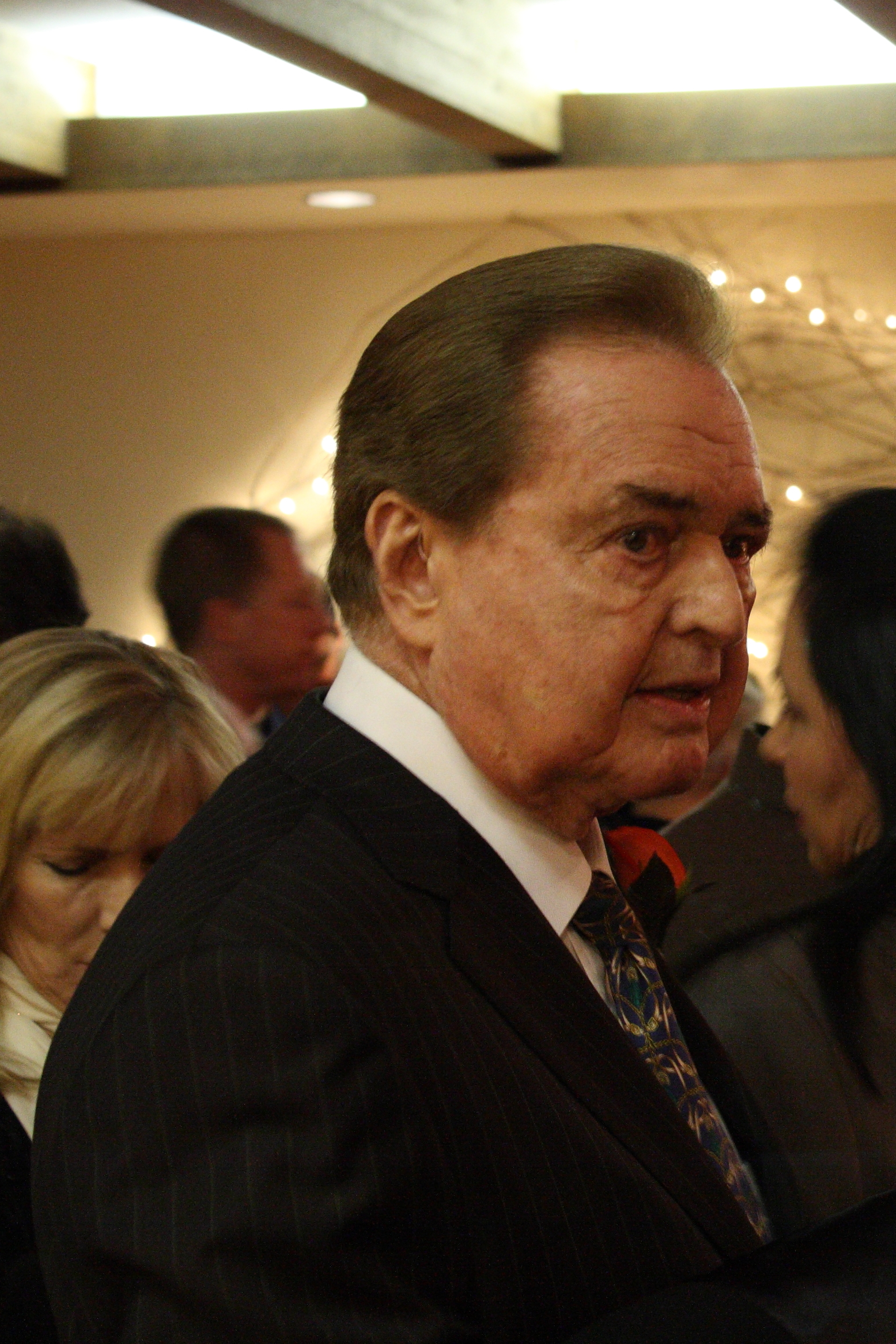
William Raggio '51 served as either Majority or Minority Leader in the Nevada State Senate for over 30 years.

- Jerome Waldie, 1953 – Majority Leader of the California State Assembly (1961–1966, served in the Assembly 1959–1966)
- Daniel Boatwright, 1959 – California State Senator (1980–1996) and member of the California State Assembly (1972–1980)
- Richard Lamm, 1961 – member of the Colorado Senate (1972–1975) and member of the Colorado House of Representatives (1964–1972)
- Pete Wilson, 1962 – member of the California State Assembly (1967–1971)
- Gabrielle LeDoux, 1973 – member of the Alaska House of Representatives from the 15th District (2005–2009, 2013–); chaired the Fisheries and the Community and Regional Affairs Committees
- Sandy Haas, 1974 – member of the Vermont House of Representatives (2005–)

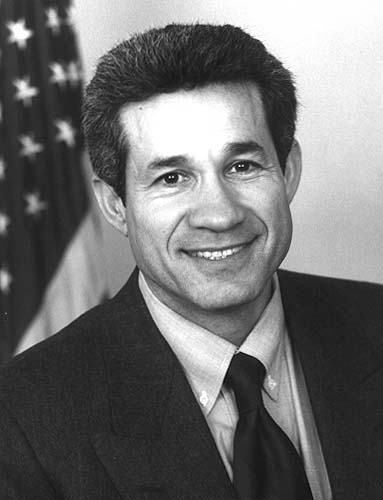
Frank Tejeda '74, former U.S. Representative and Texas State Senator

- Frank Tejeda, 1974 – Texas State Senator (1987–1993) and member of the Texas House of Representatives (1977–1987)
- Joe Simitian, 1977 – California State Senator (2004–2012), member of the California State Assembly (2000–2004)
- Juan Arambula, 1981 – member, California State Assembly (2004–2010)
- Nancy Turbak Berry, 1981 – South Dakota State Senator (2006–2010)
- Paul Krekorian, 1984 – member of the California State Assembly (2006–2010)
- John Hinck, 1990 – member of the Maine House of Representatives (2006–2012)
- Jessica Wooley, 1997 – member of the Hawaii House of Representatives (2009–2014)
- Catharine Baker, 2000 – member of the California State Assembly (2014–2018)
- Jeff Waldstreicher, 2003 – Maryland State Senator (2019–) and member of the Maryland House of Delegates (2007–2019)
- Jordan Cunningham, 2004 – member of the California State Assembly (2016–)
- Ben Allen, 2008 – California State Senator (2014–)
- Henry Stern, 2009 – California State Senator (2016–) and former senior advisor to California State Senator Fran Pavley

==== Other state and territorial officials ====
- Charles Stetson Wheeler, 1884 – Regent of the University of California (1892–1896, 1902–1907, and 1911–1923) and California Republican Party delegate to various Republican National Conventions in the early 20th century
- Jacobus tenBroek, 1938 (LL.B.) and 1940 (J.S.D.) – chair of the California Social Welfare Board (1960–1963)
- Spencer Mortimer Williams, 1948 – secretary of the California Human Relations Agency (1967–1970)
- Jerome Waldie, 1953 – member of the California Agricultural Relations Board (1981–1985)
- John P. Vukasin, Jr., 1956 – commissioner of the California Public Utilities Commission (1969–1974)
- Richard L. Wright, 1960s – member of Governor of New Jersey Jon Corzine's transition team
- David B. Frohnmayer, 1967 – president of the University of Oregon (1994–2009)
- Steven Walther, 1968 – former member of the Nevada State Advisory Committee to the United States Commission on Civil Rights
- Eleanor Nisperos, 1971 – deputy attorney general of the Northern Mariana Islands (2007–2011)
- Eni Faleomavaega, 1973 (LL.M.) – Deputy Attorney General of American Samoa (1981–1984)
- Michael S. Bernick, 1979 – director of the California Employment Development Department (1999–2004)
- Paul S. Edwards, 1991 (J.D.) and 1996 (Ph.D. in Jurisprudence and Social Policy) – deputy chief of staff for policy and communications for Governor of Utah Gary R. Herbert (2016–2019)
- Peter J. Aschenbrenner, 1971- Commissioner for the State of Alaska Commission on Judicial Conduct (2004–2012)

=== Local governments ===
==== Mayors ====
- John J. McFall, 1941 – mayor of Manteca, California (1949–1950)
- Daniel Boatwright, 1959 – mayor of Concord, California (1966–1968)
- Pete Wilson, 1962 – 29th mayor of San Diego (1971–1983)
- Kent Mitchell, 1964 – mayor of Portola Valley, California (1970s–1980s)
- Neil Goldschmidt, 1967 – 45th Mayor of Portland (1973–1979)
- Warren Widener, 1967 – first African-American mayor of Berkeley, California (1971–1979)
- Robert K. Tanenbaum, 1968 – mayor of Beverly Hills, California (1986–1994) and novelist
- Gabrielle LeDoux, 1973 – mayor of Kodiak Island Borough, Alaska (2001–2004)
- Ed Lee, 1978 – 43rd and first Asian-American mayor of San Francisco (2011–2017)

==== Local councils ====
- Alfonso Zirpoli, 1928 – member of the San Francisco Board of Supervisors (1958–1961)
- John J. McFall, 1941 – member of the Manteca City Council (1948–1949)
- Neil Goldschmidt, 1967 – City Commissioner for the Portland City Council (1971–1973)
- Warren Widener, 1967 – member of the Alameda County Board of Supervisors (1988–1992) and member of the Berkeley City Council (1969–1971)
- Susan Leal, 1975 – member of the San Francisco Board of Supervisors from the 8th District (1993–1997)
- Joe Simitian, 1977 – president of the Santa Clara County Board of Supervisors (2013–, supervisor 1996–2000) and Palo Alto City Councillor (1992–1996)
- John Gioia, 1982 – supervisor, Contra Costa County Board of Supervisors (1998–, served as chair of the board of supervisors in 2002, 2006, and 2010)
- Paul Krekorian, 1984 – Los Angeles City Councilmember (2010–)
- John Hinck, 1990 – member of the Portland, Maine City Council (2013–2017)
- Rafael Mandelman, 2000 – member of the San Francisco Board of Supervisors from the 8th District (2018–)
- Hillary Ronen, 2003 – member of the San Francisco Board of Supervisors from the 9th District (2017–)
- Jane Kim, 2009 – member of the San Francisco Board of Supervisors from the 6th District (2011–2019)

==== District attorneys ====
- Earl Warren, 1914 – district attorney of Alameda County (1925–1939)
- David John Wilson, 1919 – district attorney of Weber County, Utah (1928–1933)
- John A. Nejedly, 1941 – district attorney for Contra Costa County (1958–1969)
- D. Lowell Jensen, 1952 – district attorney of Alameda County (1969–1981)
- Thomas Orloff, 1970 – district attorney of Alameda County, California (1994–2009) who notably prosecuted the case surrounding the BART Police shooting of Oscar Grant

==== City attorneys ====
- Selim M. Franklin, 1883 – city attorney of Tucson, Arizona
- J. Leroy Johnson, 1915 – city attorney of Stockton, California
- David John Wilson, 1919 – county attorney of Weber County, Utah (1920–1925)
- George S. Ballif, 1924 – city attorney for Provo, Utah (1920s)
- John A. Nejedly, 1941 – city attorney for Walnut Creek, California (1948–1958)
- Spencer Mortimer Williams, 1948 – County Counsel for Santa Clara County (1952–1966)
- Mike Aguirre, 1975 – San Diego City Attorney (2004–2008)

==== Other local officials ====
- Charles Stetson Wheeler, 1884 – member of the Committee of Fifty which managed the reconstruction of San Francisco after the 1906 earthquake
- Harlan G. Palmer, 1913 – member of the Los Angeles Board of Water and Power Commissioners
- Dan Siegel, 1970 – member of the Oakland Unified School District board of directors (1998–2006) and legal advisor to Oakland, California Mayor Jean Quan (2011)
- Susan Leal, 1975 – Treasurer of San Francisco (1997–2004) and general manager of the San Francisco Public Utilities Commission (2004–2008)
- Ed Lee, 1978 – city administrator of San Francisco (2005–2011)
- Michael S. Bernick, 1979 – member of the BART board of directors
- Ricardo Garcia, 1995 – Public Defender for Los Angeles County
- Rafael Mandelman, 2000 – member of the City College of San Francisco board of trustees (to 2018)

=== Political figures ===
- D. Leigh Colvin, 1910s – Prohibition Party and Law Preservation Party candidate for United States Senate in 1916 and 1932, Mayor of New York City in 1917, Vice President of the United States in 1920, U.S. Representative in 1922, and President of the United States in 1936
- Earl Warren, 1914 – chair of the California Republican Party (1932–1938)
- Mathew Tobriner, 1932 (J.S.D.) – California Vice Chair of President Harry Truman's 1952 reelection campaign, and chair of Rep. Helen Gahagan Douglas's campaign for U.S. Senate
- Thomas W. Caldecott, 1940s – chair of the California Republican Party (1954–1956)
- Frank Mankiewicz, 1955 – press secretary for Robert F. Kennedy's 1968 presidential campaign and campaign director for George McGovern's 1972 presidential campaign
- Richard L. Wright, 1960s – National Finance Director for the Bill Bradley 2000 presidential campaign
- Jerry Brady, 1962 – Democratic Party nominee for Governor of Idaho in 2002 and 2006
- Frank Fahrenkopf, 1965 – chair of the Republican National Committee (1983–1989) and founder and co-chair of the Commission on Presidential Debates (1986–)
- Donald Segretti, 1966 – political operative for President Richard Nixon's Committee to Re-elect the President who was implicated in the Watergate scandal
- Karen Skelton, 1984 – political strategist, documentary filmmaker, and Democratic National Convention delegate; president of the Skelton Strategies political consulting firm and former manager of the Dewey Square Group public affairs firm
- Ann O'Leary, 2005 – senior advisor and transition team co-executive director for the Hillary Clinton 2016 presidential campaign
- Maya Rupert, 2006 – campaign manager for Julian Castro's 2020 presidential campaign

== International government and politics ==
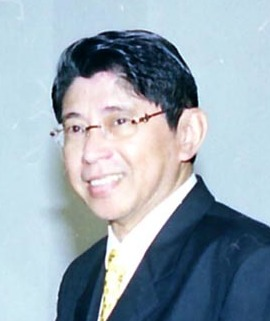
Wissanu Krea-ngam LL.M. '74, Deputy Prime Minister of Thailand

- Dobby Walker, 1942 – Observer, South African Truth and Reconciliation Commission
- Uriel Lynn, 1960s (LL.M.) – member of the Israeli Knesset (1984–1992) and director general of the Israeli Ministry of Energy and Infrastructure (1982–1984); while the Knesset, served as chair of the committees on Constitution, Law and Justice and Traffic Accidents, and of the subcommittees on Energy and Road Safety
- Wolfgang Hoffmann-Riem, 1965 (LL.M.) – representative, European Commission for Democracy through Law (2007)
- Stephen McCaffrey, 1971 – member, United Nations International Law Commission (1981–1991, served as Special Rapporteur for law on non-navigational uses of international watercourses 1985–1991) and counselor on international law for the U.S. State Department's Office of the Legal Adviser (1984–1985)
- Andrew Drzemczewski, 1974 (LL.M.) – head of the Legal Affairs and Human Rights Department, Council of Europe (2005–2016)
- Wissanu Krea-ngam, 1974 (LL.M.) and 1976 (J.S.D.) – Deputy Prime Minister of Thailand (2014–, 2002–2006) and secretary general to the Cabinet of Thailand (1996–2002)
- Theresia Degener, 1988 (LL.M.) – chair, United Nations Committee on the Rights of Persons with Disabilities and Awardee, Order of the Merit of Federal Republic of Germany, 2014
- Caroline Gooding, 1991 (LL.M.) – noted British disability rights advocate who served as special adviser to the British Disability Rights Commission (2000s) and as a member of Mayor of London Ken Livingstone's advisory cabinet
- Cho Kuk, 1995 (LL.M.) and 1997 (J.S.D.) – Minister of Justice of South Korea (2019) and Senior Secretary to the President for Civil Affairs of South Korea (2017–2019)
- Wang Junfeng, 2000 (LL.M.) and 2007 (J.S.D.) – Chinese Communist Party delegate to the 11th and 12th National Committee of the Chinese People's Political Consultative Conference, former member of the China Securities Regulatory Commission, and department head of the China Global Law Office
- Jaiveer Shergill, 2010 (LL.M.) – Indian National Congress politician and noted lawyer who has litigated cases before the Supreme Court of India
- Jan Franz Chan, 2018 (LL.M.) – member of the House of Representatives of the Philippines for Ako Bicol

== Judiciary ==
The following are Berkeley Law graduates who have served as appointed judges on international, federal, state and/or prominent criminal courts.

=== Federal courts ===
==== United States Supreme Court justices ====
- Earl Warren, 1914 – 14th Chief Justice of the United States (1953–1969)

==== Court of Appeals judges ====
- Oliver Deveta Hamlin, Jr., 1914 – judge of the United States Court of Appeals for the Ninth Circuit (1958–1963)
- Stanley Barnes, 1925 – judge of the United States Court of Appeals for the Ninth Circuit (1956–1970)

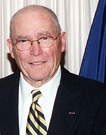
Harry Pregerson '50, former Judge, United States Court of Appeals for the Ninth Circuit

- Harry Pregerson, 1950 – judge of the United States Court of Appeals for the Ninth Circuit (1979–2015)
- J. Clifford Wallace, 1955 – judge of the United States Court of Appeals for the Ninth Circuit (1972–1996, served as chief judge 1991–1996)
- Richard Paez, 1972 – judge of the United States Court of Appeals for the Ninth Circuit (2000–)
- Marsha Berzon, 1973 – judge of the United States Court of Appeals for the Ninth Circuit (2000–)
- Evan Wallach, 1976 – judge of the United States Court of Appeals for the Federal Circuit (2011–)

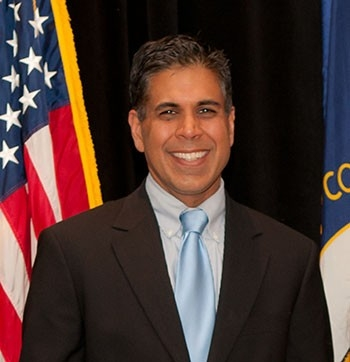
Amul Thapar '94, Judge, United States Court of Appeals for the Sixth Circuit

- Nicole Berner, 1992 – judge of the United States Court of Appeals for the Fourth Circuit (2024–)
- Amul Thapar, 1994 – judge of the United States Court of Appeals for the Sixth Circuit (2017–)
- Ana de Alba, 2007 – judge of the United States Court of Appeals for the Ninth Circuit (2023–)

==== District Court judges ====
- Harry Aaron Hollzer, 1903 – judge of the United States District Court for the Southern District of California (1931–1946)
- Oliver Deveta Hamlin, Jr., 1914 – judge of the United States District Court for the Northern District of California (1953–1958)
- Monroe Mark Friedman, 1920 – judge of the United States District Court for the Northern District of California (1952–1953)
- Walter Gordon, 1922 – judge of the United States District Court of the Virgin Islands (1958–1968)
- Albert Charles Wollenberg, 1924 – judge of the United States District Court for the Northern District of California (1958–1975)
- Sherrill Halbert, 1927 – judge of the United States District Court for the Eastern District of California (1966–1969) and the United States District Court for the Northern District of California (1954–1966)
- Martin Pence, 1928 – chief judge of the United States District Court for the District of Hawaii (1961–1974)
- Alfonso Zirpoli, 1928 – judge of the United States District Court for the Northern District of California (1961–1975)
- Gerald Sanford Levin, 1930 – judge of the United States District Court for the Northern District of California (1969–1971)
- Francis C. Whelan, 1932 – judge of the United States District Court for the Central District of California (1966–1978) and judge of the United States District Court for the Southern District of California (1964–1966)
- Lloyd Hudson Burke, 1940 – judge of the United States District Court for the Northern District of California (1958–1988)
- Myron Donovan Crocker, 1940 – chief judge of the United States District Court for the Eastern District of California (1966–1967, judge in 1966 and 1967–1981) and judge of the United States District Court for the Southern District of California (1959–1966)
- Thomas Jamison MacBride, 1941 – chief judge of the United States District Court for the Eastern District of California (1967–1979, judge on this court 1966–1967) and judge of the United States District Court for the Northern District of California (1961–1966)
- William Horsley Orrick, Jr., 1941 – judge of the United States District Court for the Northern District of California (1974–1985)
- Milton Lewis Schwartz, 1941 – judge of the United States District Court for the Eastern District of California (1979–1990)
- Edward Dean Price, 1947 – judge of the United States District Court for the Eastern District of California (1979–1989)
- Spencer Mortimer Williams, 1948 – judge of the United States District Court for the Northern District of California (1971–1987)
- William Perry Copple, 1951 – judge of the United States District Court for the District of Arizona (1966–1983)
- D. Lowell Jensen, 1952 – judge of the United States District Court for the Northern District of California (1986–1997)
- John P. Vukasin, Jr., 1956 – judge of the United States District Court for the Northern District of California (1983–1993)
- Alan Cooke Kay, 1960 – chief judge of the United States District Court for the District of Hawaii (1991–1999, judge 1986–2000)
- Lloyd D. George, 1961 – judge of the United States District Court for the District of Nevada (1992–1997)
- Thelton Henderson, 1962 – judge of the United States District Court for the Northern District of California (1990–1997)
- William B. Shubb, 1963 – chief judge of the Eastern District of California (1996–2003, judge 1990–1996 and 2003–2004)
- James Keith Singleton, Jr., 1964 – chief judge of the United States District Court for the District of Alaska (1995–2002, judge 1990–2005)
- Oliver Winston Wanger, 1966 – judge of the United States District Court for the Eastern District of California (1991–2006)
- Maxine M. Chesney, 1967 – judge of the United States District Court for the Northern District of California (1995–2009)
- Charles Breyer, 1966 – judge of the United States District Court for the Northern District of California (1997–2011)
- Linda Hodge McLaughlin, 1966 – judge of the United States District Court for the Central District of California (1992–1999)
- Richard Paez, 1972 – judge of the United States District Court for the Central District of California (1994–2000)
- Anthony W. Ishii, 1973 – chief judge of the United States District Court for the Eastern District of California (2008–2012, judge 1997–2008)

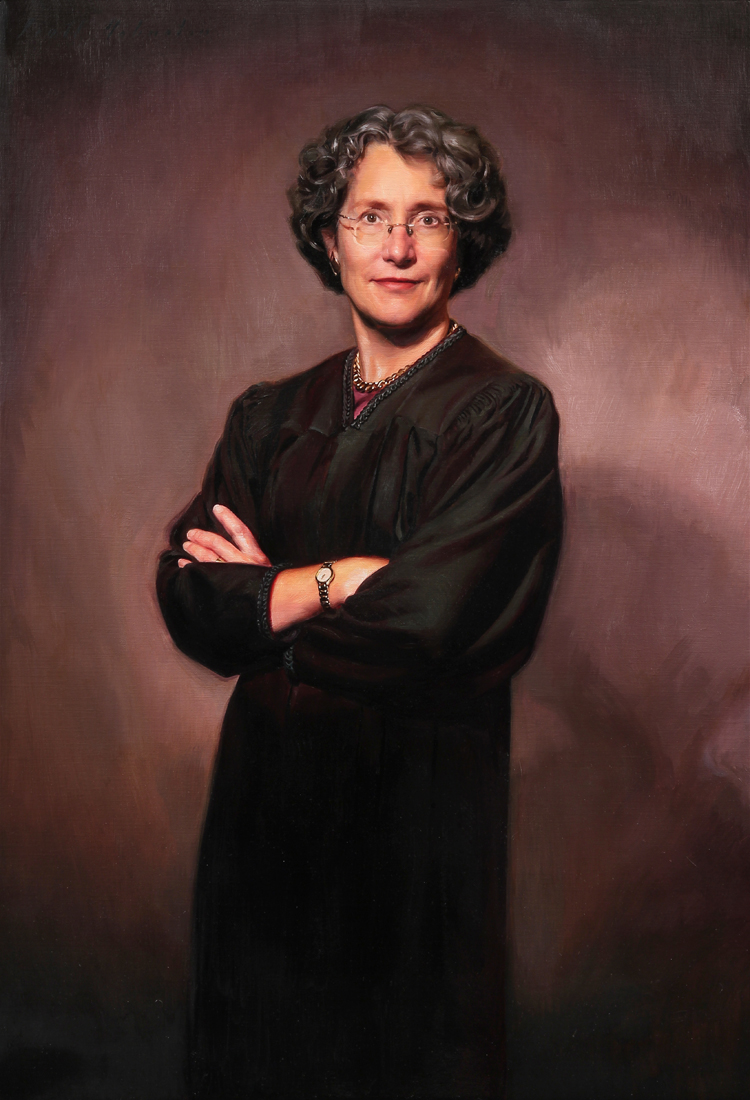
Claudia Ann Wilken '75, former Chief Judge, United States District Court for the Northern District of California

- Claudia Ann Wilken, 1975 – judge of the United States District Court for the Northern District of California (1993–2014)
- George B. Daniels, 1978 – judge of the United States District Court for the Southern District of New York (2000–)
- Richard G. Andrews, 1981 – judge of the United States District Court for the District of Delaware (2011–)
- Virginia A. Phillips, 1982 – chief judge of the United States District Court for the Central District of California (2016–, judge 1999–2016, Magistrate Judge 1995–1999)
- Michael W. Fitzgerald, 1985 – judge of the United States District Court for the Central District of California (2012–)
- Fernando L. Aenlle-Rocha, 1986 – judge of the United States District Court for the Central District of California (2020–)
- Trina Thompson, 1986 – judge, United States District Court for the Northern District of California (2022–)
- Karin Immergut, 1987 – judge of the United States District Court for the District of Oregon (2019–)
- Indira Talwani, 1988 – judge of the United States District Court for the District of Massachusetts (2014–)
- Fernando M. Olguin, 1989 – judge of the United States District Court for the Central District of California (2013–, Magistrate Judge 2001–2012)
- Jon S. Tigar, 1989 – judge of the United States District Court for the Northern District of California (2013–)

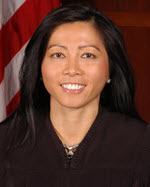
Miranda Du '94, former Chief Judge, United States District Court for the District of Nevada

- Miranda Du, 1994 – chief judge of the United States District Court for the District of Nevada (2019–2024, judge 2012–2019, 2024–)
- Amul Thapar, 1994 – judge of the United States District Court for the Eastern District of Kentucky (2008–2017)

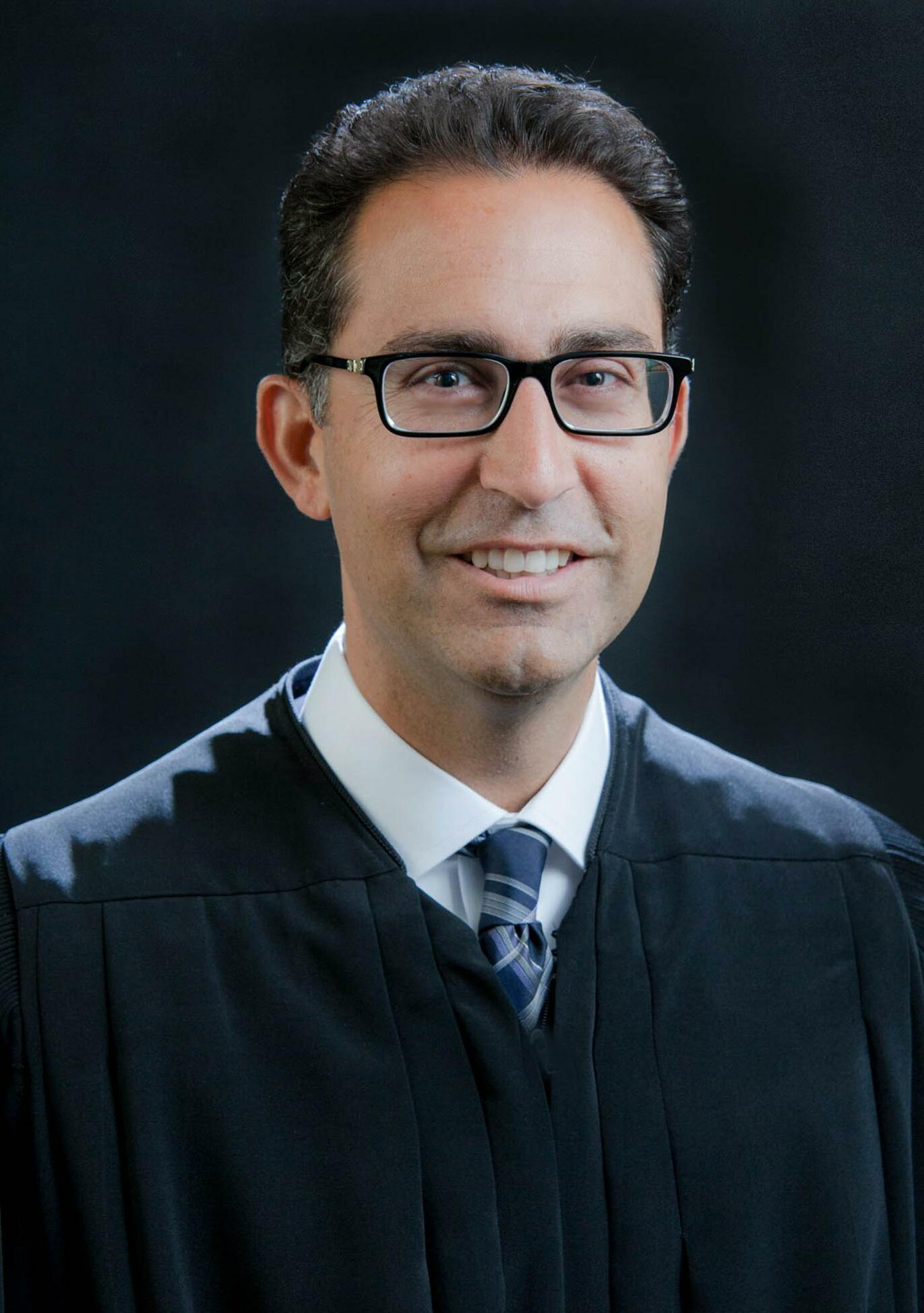
Vince Chhabria '98, Judge, United States District Court for the Northern District of California

- Vince Chhabria, 1998 – judge, United States District Court for the Northern District of California (2014–)
- Araceli Martínez-Olguín, 2004 – judge, United States District Court for the Northern District of California (2023–)
- Ana de Alba, 2007 – judge, United States District Court for the Eastern District of California (2022–2023)
- Sarala Nagala, 2008 – judge, United States District Court for the District of Connecticut (2021–)

==== Magistrate judges ====
- Lawrence R. Leavitt, 1969 – Magistrate Judge of the United States District Court for the District of Nevada
- Paul Lewis Abrams, 1983 – Magistrate Judge of the United States District Court for the Central District of California (2002–)
- Donna Ryu, 1986 – Magistrate Judge of the United States District Court for the Northern District of California (2010–)

==== Other federal judges ====
- David John Wilson, 1919 – judge of the United States Customs Court (now the United States Court of International Trade) (1954–1966)
- Thomas Jamison MacBride, 1941 – judge of the United States Foreign Intelligence Surveillance Court (1979–1980), judge of the Temporary Emergency Court of Appeals (1982–1987), and member of the Judicial Conference of the United States (1975–1978)
- Maurice B. Foley, 1985 – chief judge of the United States Tax Court (2018–, judge 1995–2018)

=== State courts ===
==== State Supreme Courts ====
===== State chief justices =====
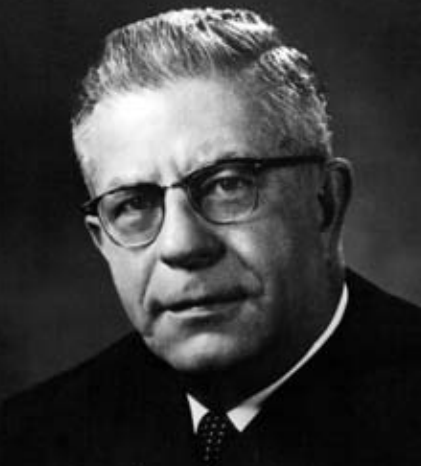
Roger J. Traynor '27, 23rd Chief Justice of California

- Roger J. Traynor, 1927 – chief justice of the Supreme Court of California (1964–1970)
- Rose Bird, 1965 – chief justice of the Supreme Court of California (1977–1987)
- Walter L. Carpeneti, 1970 – chief justice of the Supreme Court of Alaska (2009–2012)

===== State associate justices =====
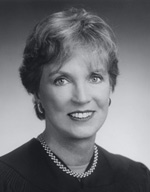
Kathryn Werdegar '62, Associate Justice of the Supreme Court of California

- Ira F. Thompson, 1909 – associate justice of the Supreme Court of California (1932–1937)
- Raymond E. Peters, 1920s – associate justice of the Supreme Court of California (1959–1973)
- Mathew Tobriner, 1932 (J.S.D.) – associate justice of the Supreme Court of California (1962–1982)
- Harry P. Glassman, 1950s – associate justice of the Maine Supreme Judicial Court (1979–1981)
- Hans A. Linde, 1950 – 79th Associate Justice of the Supreme Court of Oregon (1977–1990)
- Allen Broussard, 1953 – associate justice of the Supreme Court of California (1981–1991)
- Cruz Reynoso, 1958 – associate justice of the Supreme Court of California (1982–1987)
- Kathryn M. Werdegar, 1962 – associate justice of the Supreme Court of California (1994–2017)
- Linda Hodge McLaughlin, 1966 – associate justice pro tempore of the Supreme Court of California (1984)
- Walter L. Carpeneti, 1970 – associate justice of the Supreme Court of Alaska (1998–2013)
- Gregory J. Hobbs, Jr., 1971 – associate justice of the Supreme Court of Colorado (1996–2015)
- Cathy Silak, 1976 – associate justice of the Supreme Court of Idaho (1993–2001)
- Brent R. Appel, 1977 – associate justice of the Supreme Court of Iowa (2006–)
- Daniel Winfree, 1981 – associate justice of the Supreme Court of Alaska (2008–)
- Steven Gonzalez, 1991 – associate justice of the Washington Supreme Court (2012–)
- John A. Pearce, 1996 – associate justice of the Supreme Court of Utah (2015–)
- Matthew McDermott, 2003 – associate justice of the Supreme Court of Iowa (2020–)

==== State appellate judges ====
- James Keith Singleton, Jr., 1964 – judge of the Alaska Court of Appeals (1980–1990)
- Linda Hodge McLaughlin, 1966 – Judge pro tempore of the California Court of Appeal (1985)
- Walton J. Wood, 1900s – associate justice of the California Court of Appeal (1935–1945)
- Ira F. Thompson, 1909 – associate justice of the California Court of Appeal (1926–1932)
- Raymond E. Peters, 1920s – Presiding Justice of the California Court of Appeal (1939–1959)
- Mathew Tobriner, 1932 (J.S.D.) – associate justice of the California Court of Appeal (1959–1962)
- John Gabbert, 1934 – associate justice of the California Court of Appeal (1970–1974)
- Thomas W. Caldecott, 1940s – associate justice of the California Court of Appeal (1969–1984)
- William W. Bedsworth, 1971 – associate justice of the California Court of Appeal (1998–2010)
- Cathy Silak, 1976 – judge of the Idaho Court of Appeals (1990–1993)
- Keith K. Hiraoka, 1983 – judge of the Hawaii Intermediate Court of Appeals (2018–)

==== Superior Court judges ====
- Walton J. Wood, 1900s – judge of the California Superior Court of Los Angeles County (1921–1935)
- Harry Aaron Hollzer, 1903 – judge of the California Superior Court of Los Angeles County (1924–1931)
- Ira F. Thompson, 1909 – judge of the California Superior Court of Los Angeles County (1923–1926)
- Oliver Deveta Hamlin, Jr., 1914 – judge of the California Superior Court of Alameda County (1947–1953)
- Monroe Mark Friedman, 1920 – judge of the California Superior Court of Alameda County (1959–1971)
- Albert Charles Wollenberg, 1924 – judge of the California Superior Court of San Francisco (1947–1958)
- Sherrill Halbert, 1927 – judge of the California Superior Court (1949–1954)
- Martin Pence, 1931 – judge of the Third Circuit Court of the Territory of Hawaii (1945–1950)
- Harry P. Glassman, 1950s – judge of the Maine Superior Court (1972–1979)
- John P. Vukasin, Jr., 1956 – judge of the California Superior Court (1974–1983)
- Royce R. Lewellen, 1957 – judge of the California Superior Court of Santa Barbara County (1975–1990)
- James Keith Singleton, Jr., 1964 – judge of the Alaska Superior Court (1970–1980)
- Linda Hodge McLaughlin, 1966 – judge of the California Superior Court of Orange County (1982–1992)
- Oliver Winston Wanger, 1966 – pro tem Judge of the Superior Court of California of Fresno County (1988–1989)
- Walter L. Carpeneti, 1970 – judge of the Alaska Superior Court (1981–1988)
- Stephen Kaus, 1973 – judge of the California Superior Court of Alameda County (2012–)
- Lance Ito, 1975 – judge of the California Superior Court of Los Angeles County (1987–2015); presided during the O. J. Simpson criminal trial
- Virginia A. Phillips, 1982 – commissioner of the California Superior Court of Riverside County (1991–1995)
- Fernando L. Aenlle-Rocha, 1986 – judge of the California Superior Court of Los Angeles County (2017–2020)

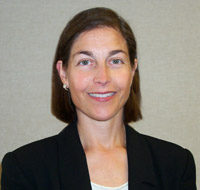
Karin Immergut '87, Judge of the United States District Court for the District of Oregon. Previously served as the U.S. Attorney for the District of Oregon and state circuit court judge.

- Karin Immergut, 1987 – judge of the Multnomah County, Oregon Circuit Court (2009–2019)
- Aaron Persky, 1990 – judge of the California Superior Court of Santa Clara County (2003–2018)
- Steven Gonzalez, 1991 – judge of the Superior Court of Washington for King County (2002–2012)
- Trina Thompson, 1986 – judge, Alameda County Superior Court (2003–2022)
- Jessica Delgado, 1998 – judge of the California Superior Court of Santa Clara County (2021–)
- Ana de Alba, 2007 – judge, Fresno County Superior Court (2018–2022)

==== Other state judges ====
- Eleanor Nisperos, 1971 – former Chief Administrative Law Judge of the California Unemployment Insurance Appeals Board; first Filipina admitted to practice law in California
- Justin Kidd, 2009 – Justice of the Peace of Marion County, Oregon (2021–)

==== Municipal judges ====
- Harlan G. Palmer, 1913 – judge of the Los Angeles Justice Court (1915–1918)
- Royce R. Lewellen, 1957 – judge of the Solvang, California Justice Court (1969–1975)
- Richard Paez, 1972 – judge of the Los Angeles Municipal Court (1981–1994)

=== International courts ===
- Wolfgang Hoffmann-Riem, 1965 (LL.M.) – judge of the Federal Constitutional Court of Germany (1999–2008) and Minister of Justice of Hamburg, Germany (1995–1997)
- Reynato S. Puno, 1968 (LL.M.) – 22nd Chief Justice of the Supreme Court of the Philippines (2006–2010) and 131st Associate Justice of the Supreme Court of the Philippines (1993–2006)
- Joan Donoghue, 1981 – president of the International Court of Justice (2021–) and judge of the International Court of Justice (2010–2021)
- David Caron, 1983 – Judge ad hoc of the International Court of Justice and member of the Iran-United States Claims Tribunal in The Hague, Netherlands
- Sir Rabinder Singh, 1986 (LL.M.) – the highest-ranking judge of Asian descent in British history and the first Sikh and youngest person to become a High Court judge in the United Kingdom. Served as Lord Justice of Appeal (2017–), Administrative Court Liaison Judge for Wales and the Midlands & Western Circuits (2017), presiding judge of the South Eastern Circuit (2013–2016), judge of the Queen's Bench Division of the High Court (2011–2013), Crown Court Recorder (2004–2011) and deputy High Court judge (2003). Member and president of the Investigatory Powers Tribunal (2016–, president since 2018)

== Academia ==
- Bernard E. Witkin, 1928 – expert on California law and founder of the Witkin law treatise sets
- George Marion Johnson, 1929 (LL.D.) and 1938 (J.S.D.) – dean and professor, Howard University School of Law, founder of the Howard Law Review Journal, founder and first vice chancellor, University of Nigeria (1960–1964), professor of law, Michigan State University School of Law, and professor of law and director of Pre-Admissions, University of Hawaii William S. Richardson School of Law
- Jacobus tenBroek, 1938 (LL.B.) and 1940 (J.S.D.) – professor of law and chair of the Department of Speech at UC Berkeley School of Law (1942–1968, department chair 1955–1968), noted for his legal writing on disability rights
- Hans A. Linde, 1950 – professor of law, University of Oregon (1954, 1959–1976), UCLA School of Law, Stanford Law School, New York University School of Law, University of Texas School of Law, and Willamette University; author of coursebooks in legislative and administrative legal processes
- Wolfgang Hoffmann-Riem, 1965 (LL.M.) – professor, Bucerius Law School of Hamburg, Germany
- Marc McGinnes, 1966 – professor, University of California, Santa Barbara Environmental Studies Program, and namesake of the McGinnes Environmental Law and Advocacy Scholarship at UCSB. Author of several conservation-related novels and the textbook Principles of Environmental Law
- Michael Tigar, 1966 – noted criminal defense and human rights lawyer and professor emeritus of the Duke University School of Law
- Oliver Winston Wanger, 1966 – co-founder, dean, and professor of the San Joaquin College of Law, professor at Humphreys College Laurence Drivon School of Law (1968–1969)
- Warren Widener, 1967 – president of the UC Berkeley Urban Housing Institute
- Gerald Horne, 1970 – African-American historian. John J. and Rebecca Moores Chair of History and African-American Studies at the University of Houston
- Stephen McCaffrey, 1971 – Legal academic specializing in international and environmental law; Carol Olsen Endowed Professor of International Law, McGeorge School of Law; professor, Southwestern University School of Law (1974–1977)
- Carol S. Bruch, 1972 – professor, UC Davis School of Law; famously challenged Richard A. Gardner's parental alienation syndrome theory in child custody cases in a 2001 paper
- Rex R. Perschbacher, 1972 – Daniel J. Dykstra Endowed Chair, professor of law, and former dean, UC Davis School of Law; professor at the UC Berkeley School of Law, University of Texas School of Law, Santa Clara University School of Law, and the University of San Diego School of Law

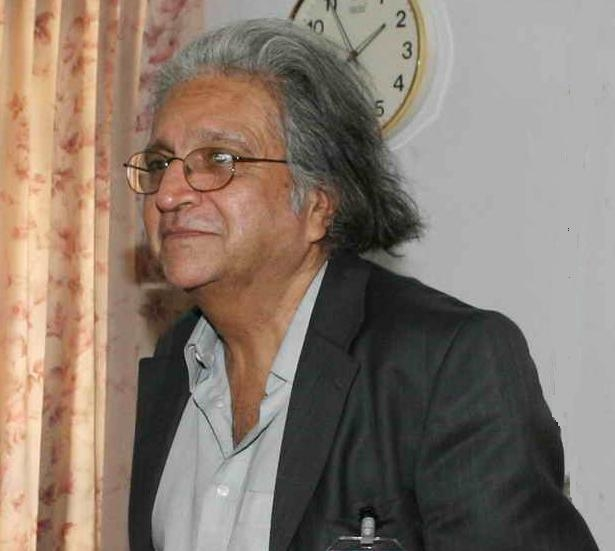
Upendra Baxi LL.M. '73 has served as dean, vice chancellor or professor at nine law schools in India, the United Kingdom, and the United States.

- Upendra Baxi, 1973 (LL.M.) – dean and vice chancellor, University of Delhi (1975–1978), president of the Indian Society of International Law (1992–1995), and Professor of Law, University of Warwick, University of Sydney, Duke University, American University, New York University School of Law, the University of Toronto, the West Bengal National University of Juridical Sciences, and the NALSAR University of Law, Hyderabad
- Samuel R. Gross, 1973 – Thomas and Mabel Long Professor of Law, University of Michigan Law School; noted for his work on false convictions and exonerations in the American judicial system, including United States Supreme Court litigation
- John A. Powell, 1973 – director of the UC Berkeley Othering and Belonging Institute, Robert D. Haas Chancellor's chair in Equity and Inclusion and Professor of African American Studies and Ethnic Studies at UC Berkeley School of Law, executive director of the Kirwan Institute for the Study of Race and Ethnicity at The Ohio State University, and executive director of the Institute on Race and Poverty at University of Minnesota Law School
- Bob Berring, 1974 – legal librarian and professor, UC Berkeley School of Law
- Richard Delgado, 1974 – professor at the University of Pittsburgh School of Law and noted expert in civil rights law and critical race theory
- Andrew Drzemczewski, 1974 (LL.M.) – professor of law, Middlesex University, Jagiellonian University, University of Notre Dame and London Metropolitan University
- Linda Greene, 1974 – Evjue Bascom Professor of Law, University of Wisconsin Law School (1989–), and vice chancellor, University of California, San Diego (2013–2014) and University of Wisconsin-Madison (1999–2004)
- Christopher Schroeder, 1974 – professor of the Duke University School of Law
- Steven Ferrey, 1975 – environmental law professor at Suffolk University
- Justus Weiner, 1975 – Distinguished Scholar in Residence at the Jerusalem Center for Public Affairs, former professor at Boston University School of Law, and former senior attorney in the Israeli Ministry of Justice
- Philip Alston, 1976 (LL.M.) – John Norton Pomeroy Professor of Law and co-chair of the NYU Center for Human Rights and Global Justice, New York University School of Law, United Nations Special Rapporteur on extrajudicial, summary, or arbitrary executions (2004–2010)
- Lea Brilmayer, 1976 – Howard M. Holtzmann Professor of International Law at Yale Law School
- Ira J. Kurzban, 1976 – author of the influential one-volume immigration law treatise Kurzban's Immigration Law Sourcebook; faculty member, University of Miami School of Law
- Cathy Silak, 1976 – founding dean of Concordia University School of Law
- Janet Cooper Alexander, 1978 – Frederick I. Richman Professor of Law, Stanford Law School
- André Bertrand, 1978 – French attorney and successful author of intellectual property treatises
- Eric Yamamoto, 1978 – professor of Law and Social Justice at the University of Hawaii at Manoa William S. Richardson School of Law
- Rebecca S. Eisenberg, 1979 – Robert and Barbara Luciano Professor, University of Michigan Law School
- James D. Gordon III, 1980 – president for planning and assessment and Marion B. and Rulon A. Earl Professor of Law, Brigham Young University J. Reuben Clark Law School
- Theresia Degener, 1980s (LL.M.) – professor of law, Protestant University for Applied Sciences Freiburg, visiting professor, UC Berkeley School of Law, and notable disability rights activist
- Richard Hyland, 1980 – International trade law professor at Rutgers Law School
- David Caron, 1983 – dean, King's College London School of Law and professor, Berkeley Law
- Valerie King, 1983 – computer scientist and professor at the University of Victoria
- Victoria Nourse, 1984 – Ralph V. Whitworth Professor of Law, Georgetown University Law Center (2019–), LQC Lamar Professor of Law, Emory University School of Law (2008–2010), and Professor of Law, New York University School of Law (2003), Yale Law School (2002), and University of Maryland School of Law (1996–1997)
- Jody Armour, 1986 – Roy P. Crocker Professor of Law, USC Gould School of Law
- Harry Litman, 1986 – constitutional law and national security law professor, UCLA School of Law; professor, University of California, San Diego; author of articles on constitutional law, criminal law, and federalism
- Donna Ryu, 1986 – Clinical Professor of Law, UC Hastings and associate director of the Women's Rights Employment Clinic, Golden Gate University School of Law
- Sir Rabinder Singh, 1986 (LL.M.) – Special Professor of Law at the University of Nottingham, professor of law at the London School of Economics, and lecturer at Queen Mary University of London

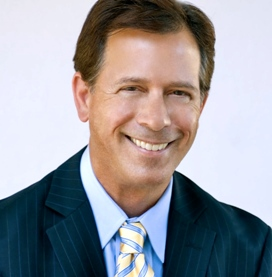
Michael H. Cohen '87, Assistant Professor of Health Law and Policy, Harvard School of Public Health

- Michael H. Cohen, 1987 – assistant professor of Health Law and Policy, Harvard School of Public Health, assistant professor, Harvard Medical School
- Kevin Quinn, S.J., 1988 – Jesuit, law professor and president of the University of Scranton (2011–2017)
- Francesco Parisi, 1988 (LL.M.) and 1990 (J.S.D.) – legal scholar and economist specializing in economic analysis of law; Oppenheimer Wolff and Donnelly Professor of Law at the University of Minnesota Law School, Distinguished Professor of Economics at the University of Bologna, and faculty member of the University of Milan
- Ugo Mattei, 1989 (LL.M.) – Italian and international legal scholar; Alfred and Hanna Fromm Professor of International and Comparative Law at the University of California, Hastings College of the Law; Professor of Civil Law at the University of Turin
- Nancy Combs, 1990s – Ernest W. Goodrich Professor, Cabell Research Professor, and director of the Human Security Law Center, William & Mary Law School
- Paul S. Edwards, 1991 (J.D.) and 1996 (Ph.D. in Jurisprudence and Social Policy) – executive director, Wheatley Institution at Brigham Young University and provost and executive vice president, Southern Virginia University
- Mark Lemley, 1991 – IP, patent, trademark, and antitrust law expert; William H. Neukom Professor of Law and director of the Program in Law, Science & Technology, Stanford Law School; served as professor of law at the University of Texas School of Law and as the Marrs McLean and Elizabeth Josselyn Boalt Professor of Law at UC Berkeley School of Law; author of the two-volume treatise IP and Antitrust
- Kenneth L. Marcus, 1991 – Lillie and Nathan Ackerman Professor of Equality and justice, City University of New York Baruch College (2010s–2018)
- Kimberly K. Smith, 1991 – noted historian and political science professor
- James Cavallaro, 1992 – founder and director, International Human Rights and Conflict Resolution Clinic, Mills Legal Clinic, and Stanford Human Rights Center, Stanford Law School
- Jennifer Rodgers, 1995 – Columbia Law School professor, CNN legal analyst, and Assistant U.S. Attorney for the United States Attorney for the Southern District of New York
- Gloria Nevarez, 1997 – adjunct professor of sports law, University of San Francisco (2004–2006)
- Tom Ginsburg, 1997 – Leo Spitz Professor of International Law, University of Chicago Law School
- Robert Chao Romero, 1998 (J.D.) –Associate Professor at the Chicana/o and Central American Studies, UCLA
- Colleen V. Chien, 2002 – professor of IP and patent law, Santa Clara University School of Law and senior adviser Chief Technology Officer of the United States Todd Park (2012–2014); noted for her research into patent assertion entities or "patent trolls"
- Will Youmans, 2003 – associate professor of the George Washington University School of Media and Public Affairs

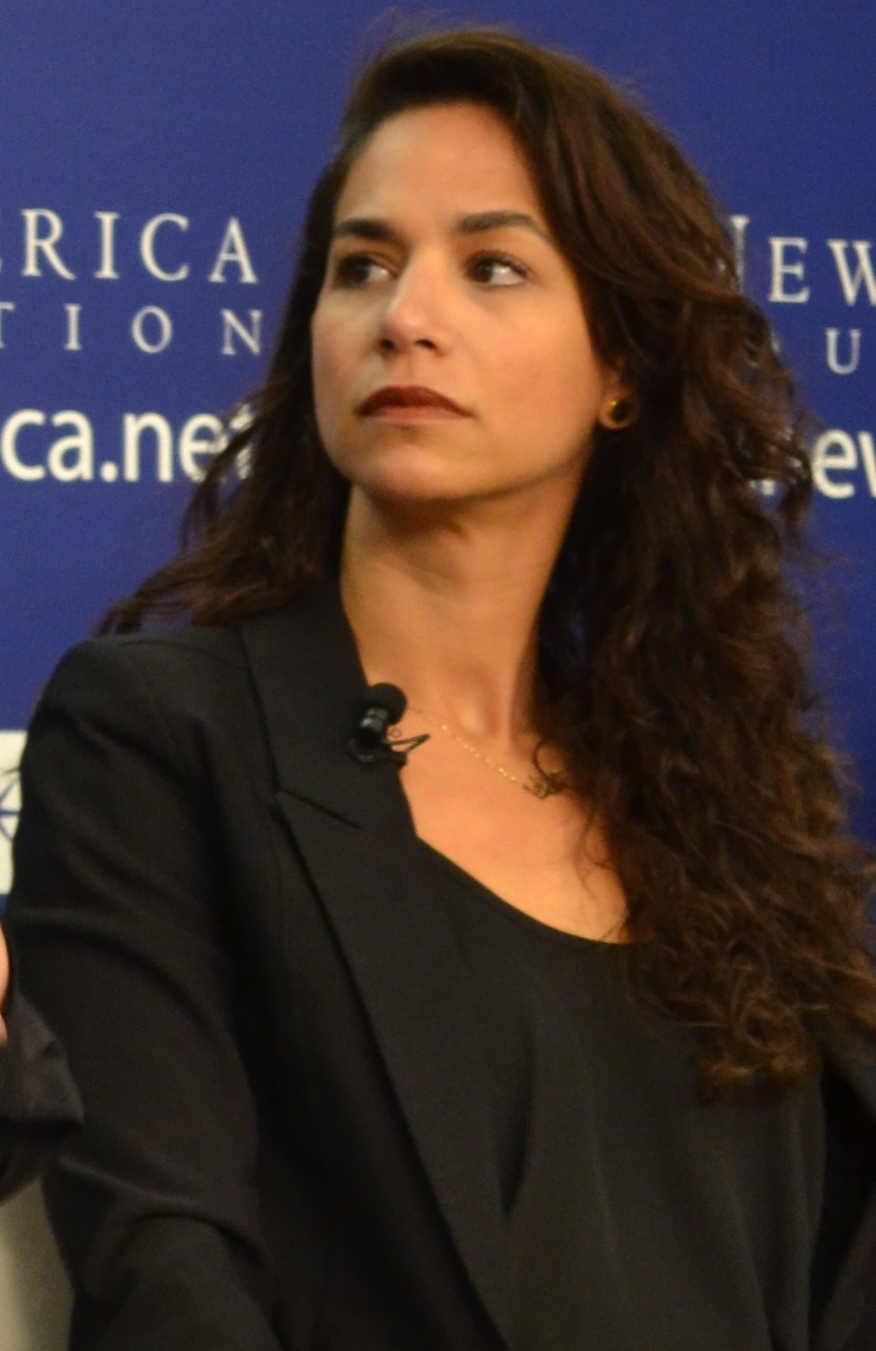
Noura Erakat '05, Palestinian-American legal scholar

- Noura Erakat, 2005 – Palestinian-American legal scholar, human rights attorney, assistant professor at George Mason University, board member of the Institute for Policy Studies and the Trans-Arab Research Institute, and policy advisor for Al-Shabaka: The Palestinian Policy Network
- Shawn Bayern, 2006 – professor, Florida State University College of Law and Duke Law School
- Veena Dubal, 2006 – professor, University of California, Irvine School of Law
- Aaron Perzanowski, 2006 – Thomas W. Lacchia Professor, University of Michigan Law School

== Business and technology ==
- Cyril Magnin, 1900s – chief executive, chairman, and president, Joseph Magnin Co., and general partner and chairman of Cyril Magnin Investments Ltd. and the Lilli Ann Corporation
- Robert L. Bridges, 1933 – director of the Bechtel Corporation and noted construction industry lawyer
- Howard Lincoln, 1965 – former chairman of Nintendo of America
- Larry Hillblom, 1969 – co-founder, DHL Express
- William S. Price III, 1981 – co-founder, Texas Pacific Group
- Nancy R. Heinen, 1982 – general counsel and senior vice president of Apple, Inc. (1997–2006)
- Paula Boggs, 1984 – executive vice president and general counsel of Starbucks Corporation (2002–2012) and vice president of Dell Inc.; served on President Obama's Committee on the Arts and Humanities and as a member of the White House Council for Community Solutions
- Helane Morrison, 1984 – general counsel and chief compliance officer, Hall Capital Partners LLC

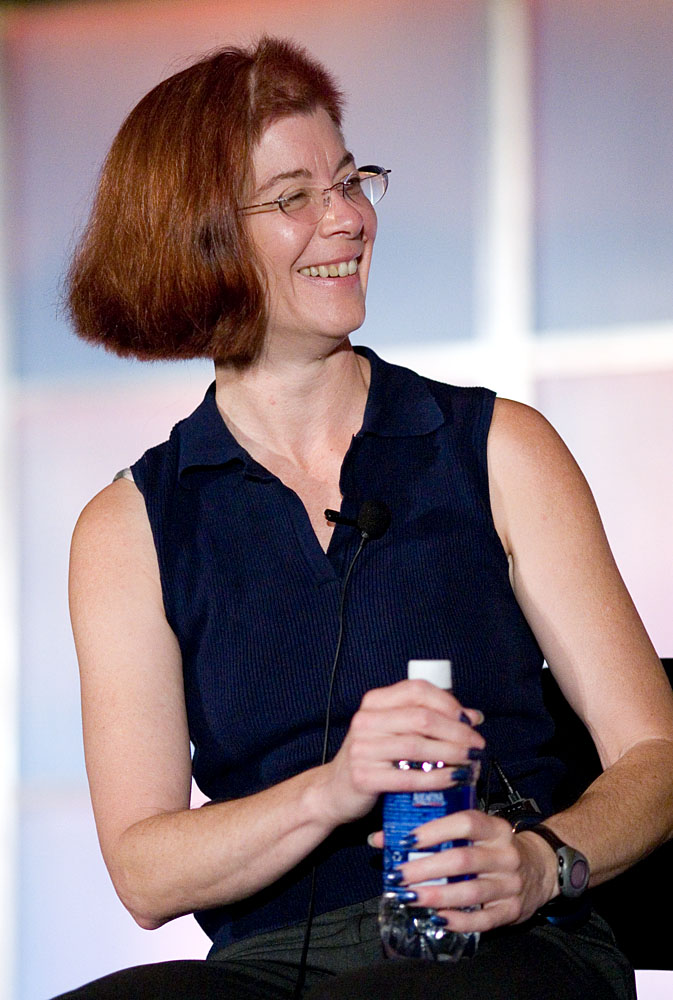
Mitchell Baker '87, CEO and executive chair of the Mozilla Corporation

- Mitchell Baker, 1987 – executive chair and CEO, Mozilla Foundation and Mozilla Corporation
- Stephanie Dorgan, 1988—founder of The Crocodile nightclub
- Louis Hsieh, 1990 – prominent Chinese businessman and attorney who serves or has served as independent director and audit chairman of direct sales corporation JD.com, chief financial officer of Chinese autonomous and electric vehicle company Nio, senior advisor, director, and president of Chinese private educational services provider New Oriental, managing director of UBS Capital Asia Pacific and Darby Asia Investors, and chief financial officer of Ario Data Networks
- Linda Menghetti, 1990 – vice president of the National Association of Manufacturers, CF Industries Holding, Inc., and the Emergency Committee for American Trade

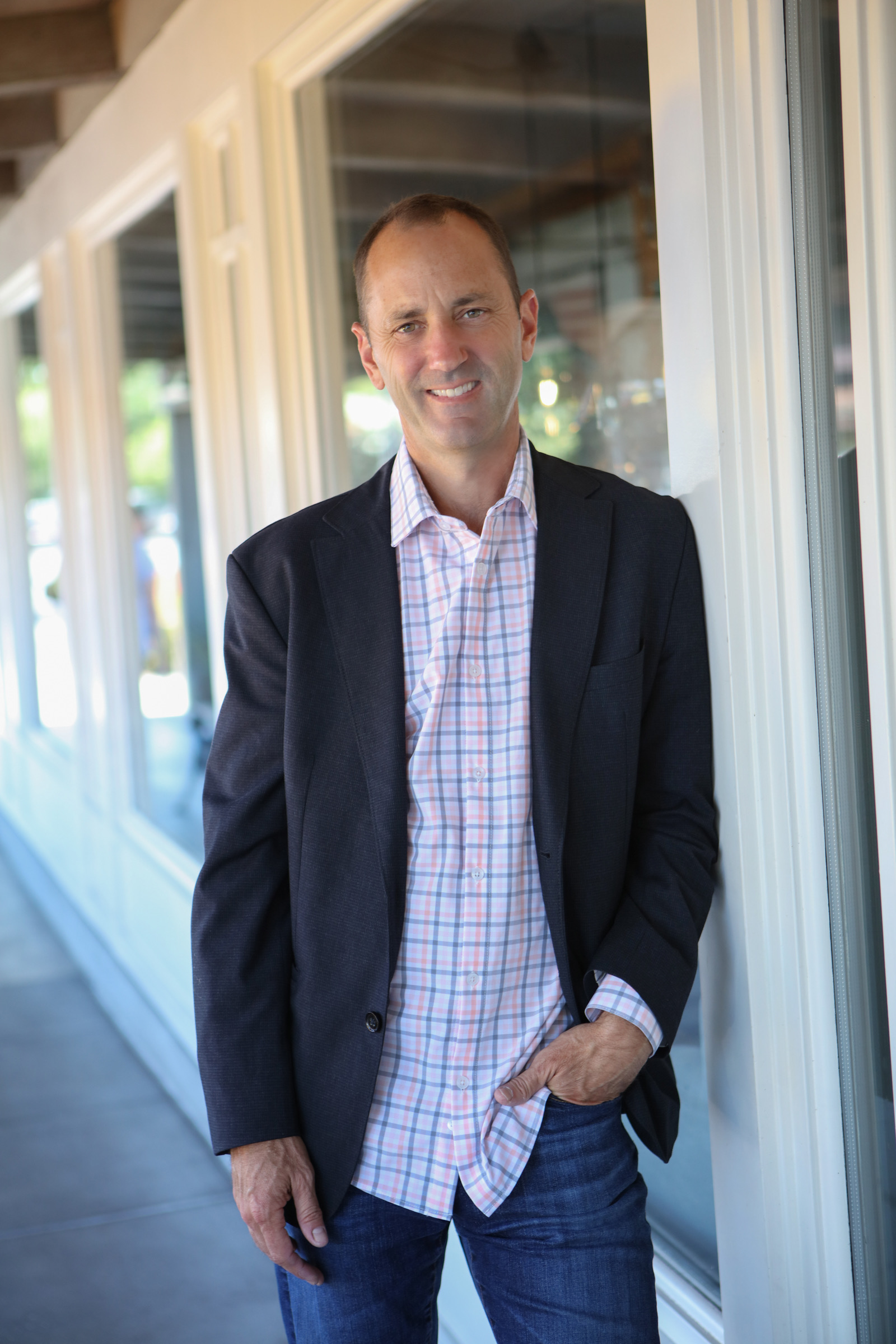
David Estrada '93, former Chief Legal Officer at GoogleX and VP of Government Relations at Lyft

- David Estrada, 1993 – chief legal officer at Nuro, former chief legal officer at Bird, Kitty Hawk Corporation, and Google X, and former vice president of government relations at Lyft
- Ken DeLeon, 1998 – notable Silicon Valley philanthropist and realtor
- Andrei Cherny, 2003 – CEO and co-founder of financial services company Aspiration, Inc., co-founder of progressive publication Democracy: A Journal of Ideas, chair, Arizona Democratic Party, Democratic nominee for Congress and State Treasurer of Arizona, and advisor to the Gore and Kerry presidential campaigns

=== Hospitality ===
- Eugene Selvage, 1920s – founder and owner of Lucky Lager Brewing Company and General Brewing Company, president of the California Brewers Association, and sponsor of the Lucky International Open
- Jess Jackson, 1955 – founder, Kendall-Jackson Wines
- Royce R. Lewellen, 1957 – founder, Lucas & Lewellen Vineyards of Santa Barbara County
- Richard L. Wright, 1960s – director, LaFollette Vineyard and Winery

== Nonprofit and non-governmental organizations ==
- Cyril Magnin, 1900s – president of the Port of San Francisco, president of the San Francisco Chamber of Commerce, regional treasurer for President Franklin D. Roosevelt's 1944 reelection campaign, and finance chair of President Lyndon B. Johnson's 1964 campaign in the California Democratic presidential primary
- Eloise B. Cushing, 1919 – major writing of the Soroptimist International's first Constitution and By-Laws
- Richard M. Leonard, 1932 – environmentalist and rock climber who served as president of the Sierra Club and the Save the Redwoods League
- Jacobus tenBroek, 1938 (LL.B.) and 1940 (J.S.D.) – noted disability rights activist and legal academic who organized the National Federation of the Blind and the International Federation of the Blind
- Dobby Walker, 1942 – first woman president of the National Lawyers Guild and leader in the Gray Panthers
- Al Bendich, 1955 – notable ACLU civil rights lawyer
- Royce R. Lewellen, 1957 – founding director, Pacific Conservatory of the Performing Arts Foundation and the Community Bank of Santa Maria, California
- Uriel Lynn, 1960s (LL.M.) – president of the Tel Aviv and Central Israel Chamber of Commerce and the Federation of Israeli Chambers of Commerce
- Richard L. Wright, 1960s – executive director of Amnesty International
- Alan Cooke Kay, 1960 – former director of the Legal Aid Society of Honolulu, Hawaii (1968–1971)
- Frank Fahrenkopf, 1965 – chief executive, American Gaming Association (1995–2013) and member of the board of trustees, Economic Club of Washington and Federal City Council
- Marc McGinnes, 1966 – notable environmental lawyer and legal academic who served as founding president of the Community Environmental Council, founding chief counsel of the Environmental Defense Center, and chair of the national Environmental Rights Day Conference in 1969, a precursor to the future Earth Day holiday
- Warren Widener, 1967 – former president, Berkeley Repertory Theatre
- Raymond Shonholtz, 1968 – founder of Community Boards and Partners for Democratic Change
- Gordon C. Strachan, 1968 – general counsel to the United States Ski and Snowboard Association and member of the Olympic Organizing Committee for the 2002 Winter Games
- Steven Walther, 1968 – co-chair of the American Bar Association Center for Human Rights, former ABA Representative to the United Nations, former chair of the Fellows of the American Bar Association, and former president of the State Bar Association of Nevada, the Western States Bar Conference, and the National Caucus of Bar Associations
- John R. Phillips, 1969 – co-director of the Center for Law in the Public Interest (CLIPI) in Los Angeles and founder of Taxpayers Against Fraud
- Michael Pack, 1970s – president and CEO of the Claremont Institute (2015–2017)
- Richard Paez, 1972 – executive director (1980–1981) and director of litigation (1978–1979, 1980–1981) of the Legal Aid Foundation of Los Angeles
- Andrew Drzemczewski, 1974 – secretary general, Association of the Friends of the International Institute of Human Rights and board member, European Human Rights Association

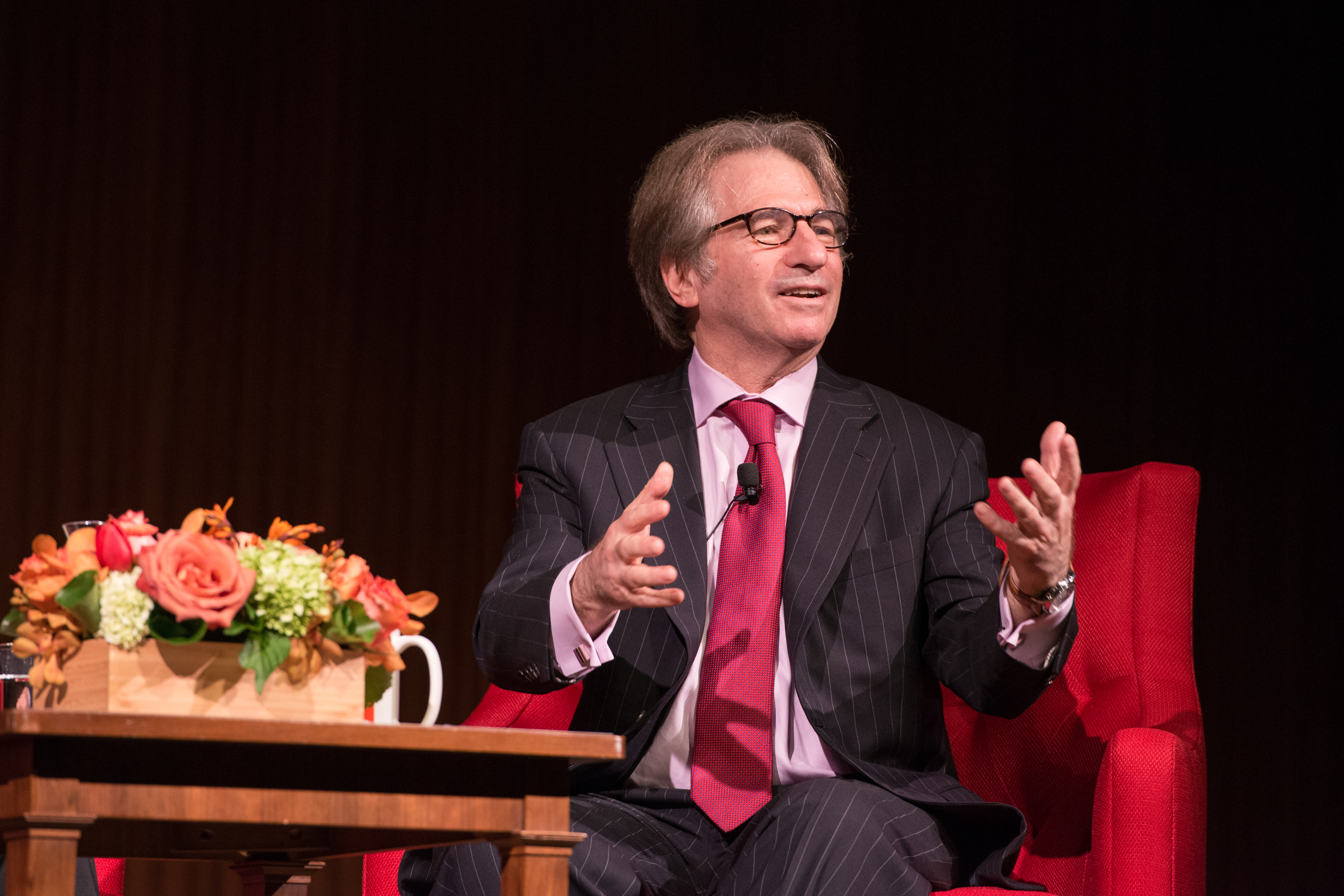
Barry Scheck '74, co-founder of the Innocence Project

- Barry Scheck, 1974 – co-founder of the Innocence Project
- Steven Ferrey, 1975 – legal advisor, World Bank
- Eva Paterson, 1975 – president and founder of the Equal Justice Society, vice president of the ACLU National Board, and chair of the California Coalition for Civil Rights; authored landmark U.S. Supreme Court lawsuits challenging state policies that prohibit race-conscious admissions

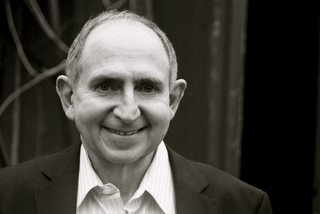
Ira Kurzban '76, Founder, Institute of Justice & Democracy in Haiti

- Ira J. Kurzban, 1976 – founder, Institute of Justice & Democracy in Haiti, board member, Immigrants' List, general counsel, American Immigration Lawyers Association (1987–1988)
- Cathy Silak, 1976 – president and CEO of the Idaho Community Foundation
- Joan Abrahamson, 1980 – founder of the Jonas Salk Foundation and the Jefferson Institute and assistant chief of staff to Vice President George H. W. Bush (1981–1985)
- Brad Adams, 1980s – executive director of the Asian Division of Human Rights Watch
- Fernando M. Olguin, 1989 – Education Program Director of the Mexican American Legal Defense and Educational Fund (1994–1995)
- Jamie Fellner, 1990s – senior counsel, Human Rights Watch
- Paul S. Edwards, 1991 (J.D.) and 1996 (Ph.D. in Jurisprudence and Social Policy) – vice president of academic affairs, Institute for Humane Studies (1999–2002)

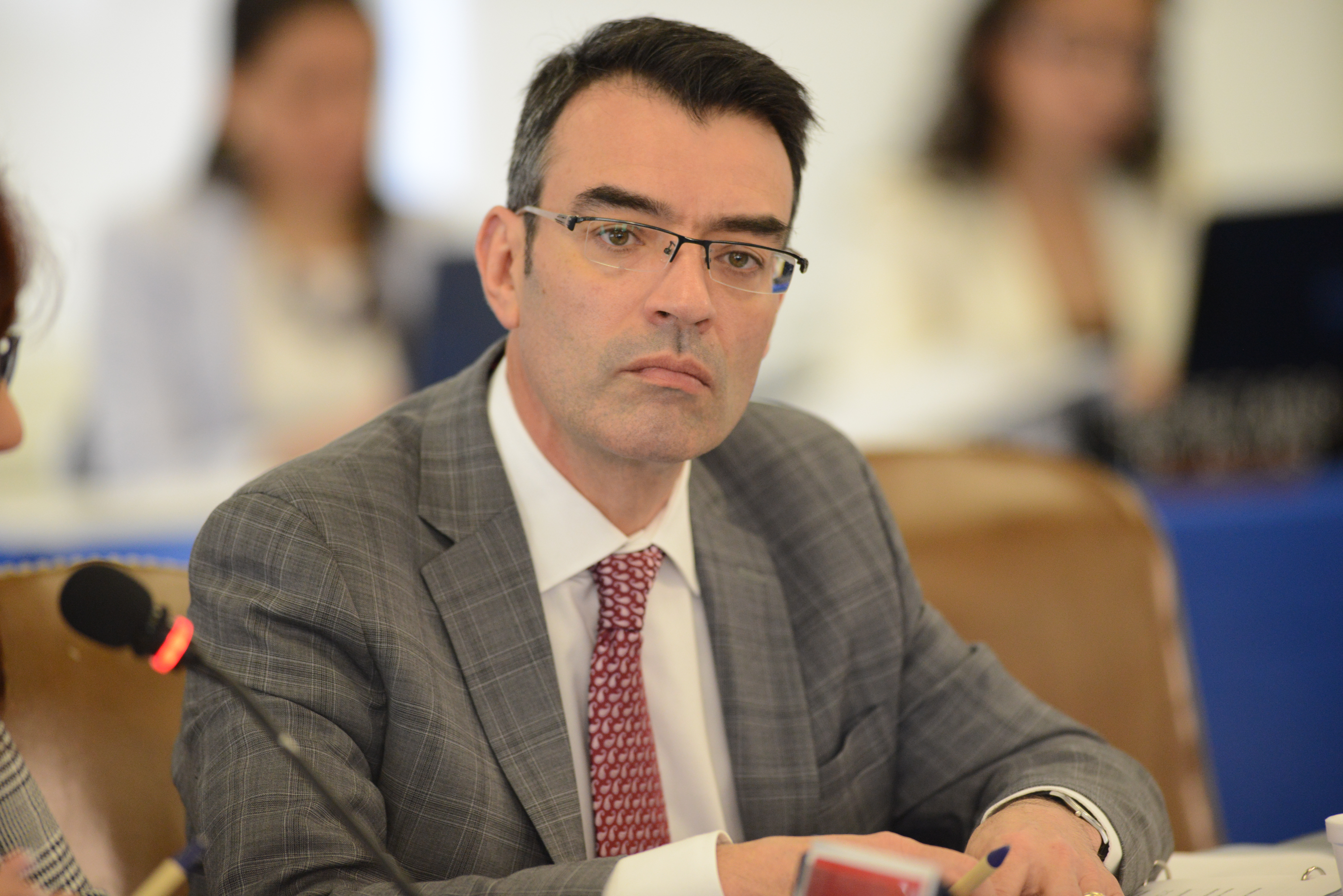
James Cavallaro '92, former president of the Inter-American Commission on Human Rights

- James Cavallaro, 1992 – president, Inter-American Commission on Human Rights (2016–2017), founder, Global Justice Center, director, Human Rights Watch and Center for Justice and International Law office in Rio de Janeiro
- Jill Escher, 1996 – president, Autism Society of America of the San Francisco Bay Area, president, National Council on Severe Autism, founder, Escher Fund for Autism
- Wang Junfeng, 2000 (LL.M.) and 2007 (J.S.D.) – former president of the All China Lawyers Commission and former director of the China Chamber of Commerce
- Jeff Waldstreicher, 2003 – chair of NARAL Pro-Choice Maryland, chair of the NAACP Legal Redress Committee, and Pro-Bono counsel for the Sierra Club
- Ann O'Leary, 2005 – executive director of the Center on Health, Economic, and Family Security at UC Berkeley School of Law (2008–2015) and senior fellow, Center for American Progress (2008–2015)
- Maya Rupert, 2006 – senior director and managing director of the Washington, D.C. office of the Center for Reproductive Rights, executive director of Opportunity First PAC, and policy director of the National Center for Lesbian Rights
- Anne Tamar-Mattis, 2006 – legal director and founder of interACT
- Heather McGhee, 2009 – president and Senior Distinguished Fellow at Demos, a progressive think-tank, and co-chair of an Americans for Financial Reform task force that helped develop the Dodd-Frank Wall Street reform package

== Private law practice ==
- Charles Stetson Wheeler, 1884 – notable San Francisco-based attorney who served as partner at Bishop, Wheeler and Hoefler LLP and Wheeler Bovie LLP.; represented various well-known clients including the Bank of British North America and Phoebe Apperson Hearst
- Walton J. Wood, 1900s – first public defender in United States history
- Melvin Belli, 1929 – a prominent attorney known informally as "The King of Torts"
- Annie Coker, 1929 – first African-American woman attorney in California
- Richard M. Leonard, 1932 – founding director and general counsel, Varian Associates
- Mathew Tobriner, 1932 (J.S.D.) – noted labor lawyer who founded Tobriner, Lazarus, Brundage and Neyhart LLP and represented the American Federation of Labor
- Whitney Robson Harris, 1933 – Nuremberg Trials prosecutor, United States Navy attorney, and namesake of the Whitney R. Harris World Law Institute at the Washington University School of Law
- Dobby Walker, 1942 – labor and criminal attorney who served as founding partner of Treuhaft, Walker and Burnstein LLP who notably represented individuals accused of crime for being Communists before the House Un-American Activities Committee and whistleblower John W. Powell; served on the defense team of Angela Davis during her murder trial
- Anna Pauline (Pauli) Murray, 1945 (LL.M.) – civil rights activist, women's rights activist, lawyer, and writer; first Black woman ordained as an Episcopalian priest
- Merrill Kenneth Albert, 1955 – noted lawyer and author
- John S. Martel, 1960 – noted San Francisco trial lawyer who consulted during the O. J. Simpson and Lyle and Erik Menendez trials
- Tony Serra, 1961 – civil rights lawyer who defended Huey Newton, Chol Soo Lee, and Raymond "Shrimp Boy" Chow in criminal court cases; notable for his involvement in tax resistance organizing
- Gary J. Aguirre, 1966 – noted United States Securities and Exchange Commission (SEC) investigator and whistleblower
- Larry W. Sonsini, 1966 – chairman of the Silicon Valley law firm Wilson, Sonsini, Goodrich & Rosati
- Steven Walther, 1968 – co-founder of Maupin, Gox and LeGoy LLP
- Dan Siegel, 1970 – civil rights attorney at the Oakland, California law firm Siegel and Yee and general counsel for Pacifica Radio

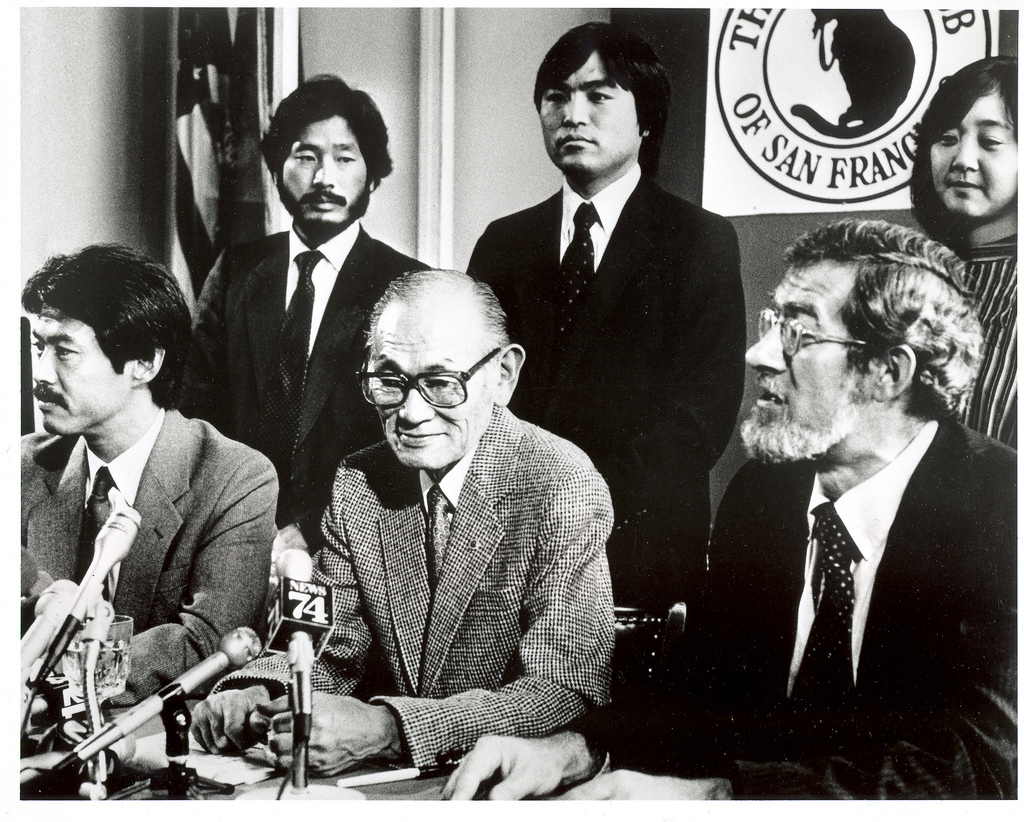
Dale Minami '71 (pictured on the far left), the lead litigator in the case that overturned Fred Korematsu's prior conviction in Korematsu v. United States

- Dale Minami, 1971 – leader of legal team that overturned the wrongful conviction of Fred Korematsu
- John L. Burris, 1973 – noted civil rights attorney
- Jack Palladino, 1975 – San Francisco-based private investigator and attorney notable for his work with the Peoples Temple tragedy, his defense of John DeLorean, whistleblower Jeffrey Wigand, singer Courtney Love, and musician R. Kelly
- Ira J. Kurzban, 1976 – noted immigration and civil rights lawyer; partner at the firm Kurzban Kurzban Tetzeli, P.A.; litigated several high-profile immigration cases before the United States Supreme Court and previously represented and prosecuted prominent Haitian government leaders

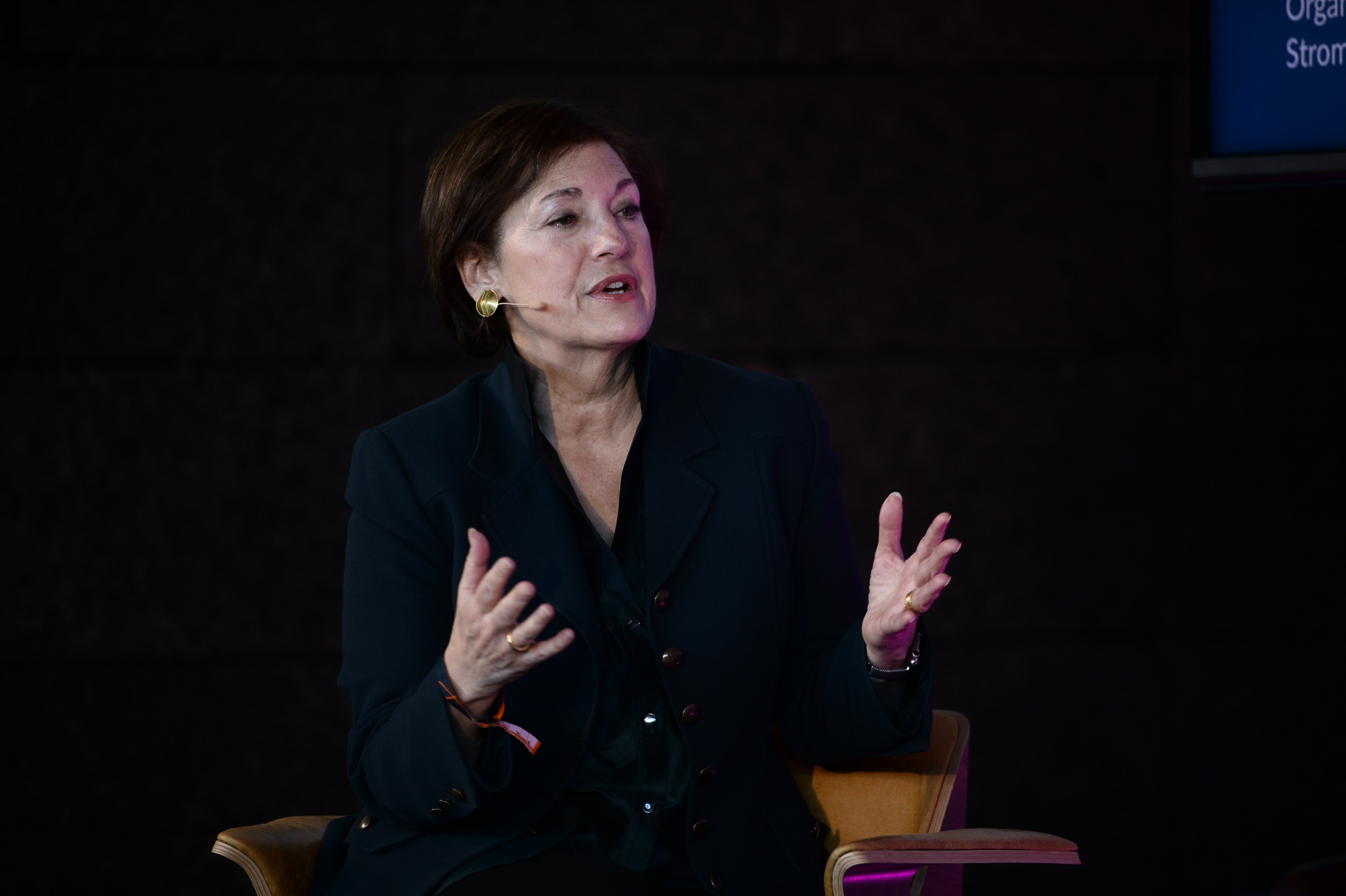
Zoë Baird '77, former partner at O'Melveny & Myers and president of the Markle Foundation

- Zoë Baird, 1977 – executive director of the Markle Foundation and former partner at O'Melveny & Myers LLP.; President Bill Clinton's first unsuccessful nominee for United States Attorney General in 1993
- Carl E. Douglas, 1980 – notable sports lawyer who defended O. J. Simpson in his murder case, rappers Tupac Shakur and Sean "Puffy" Combs, and actor Todd Bridges
- Eric Yamamoto, 1978 – litigator in the landmark U.S. Supreme Court case Korematsu v. United States
- Frederick Hertz, 1981 – notable San Francisco Bay Area attorney
- Kelly Moore, 1982 – lawyer who notably represented Guess (clothing) model and Playboy Playmate of the Year Anna Nicole Smith in several estate cases that went before the U.S. Supreme Court
- Marlys Edwardh, 1983 (LL.M.) – high-profile Canadian civil rights and criminal attorney and member of the Order of Canada
- Harry Litman, 1986 – personal counsel for CFPB Director Richard Cordray and Pittsburgh Mayor Thomas J. Murphy, Jr., and counsel to the Kerry-Edwards presidential campaign and the 2008 Obama-Biden presidential campaign
- Sir Rabinder Singh, 1986 (LL.M.) – co-founder of Matrix Chambers and King's Counsel
- Michael H. Cohen, 1987 – founder, Cohen Healthcare Law Group
- Kenneth Wainstein, 1988 – partner, Davis Polk & Wardwell LLP and former litigation co-chair of Cadwalader, Wickersham & Taft
- Mark Lemley, 1991 – noted IP, computer and internet, patent, trademark, antitrust, and remedies lawyer; founding partner of Durie Tangri LLP.

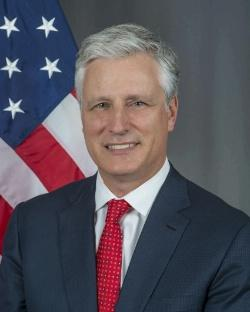
Robert C. O'Brien '91, 28th United States National Security Advisor

- Robert O'Brien, 1991 – managing partner of Arent Fox LLP, and founding partner of Larson O'Brien LLP.; represented Buzz Aldrin and the Democratic Republic of Timor-Leste, and served as counsel to Governor Scott Walker's 2016 presidential campaign and advisor to Senator Ted Cruz's 2016 presidential campaign
- Jahna Lindemuth, 1997 – managing partner, Dorsey & Whitney's Anchorage office, noted for her defense of the Fairbanks Four
- Wang Junfeng, 2000 (LL.M.) and 2007 (J.S.D.) – global chair and founding partner of King & Wood Mallesons, the largest international law firm based outside of the United States and the United Kingdom
- Matthew McDermott, 2003 – president of the Bellin McCormack P.C. law firm in Des Moines, Iowa.; represented the State of Iowa, the Iowa Republican Party and Governor of Iowa Kim Reynolds
- Ann O'Leary, 2005 – partner at Boies Schiller Flexner LLP (2016–2019)
- Pratik A. Shah, 2011 – co-director of Akin Gump's U.S. Supreme Court and Appellate Practice, who argued 13 cases in front of the U.S. Supreme Court, including United States v. Windsor

== Sports ==
- Walter Gordon, 1922 – first All-American football team member at UC Berkeley and the first African American graduate of Berkeley Law
- Kent Mitchell, 1964 – rowing coxswain who competed in the 1960 Olympics and 1964 Olympics, where he won a gold medal and a bronze medal, respectively
- Roy Eisenhardt, 1965 – former president, Oakland Athletics
- Howard Lincoln, 1965 – former CEO of the Seattle Mariners
- Billy Hunter, 1971 – former executive director of the National Basketball Players Association and former wide receiver for the Washington Redskins and Miami Dolphins of the National Football League
- Leigh Steinberg, 1973 – notable sports agent
- Michele A. Roberts, 1980 – executive director, National Basketball Players Association
- Rod Gilmore, 1986 – college football analyst for ABC Sports and ESPN
- Terdema Ussery, 1987 – former president and CEO of the Dallas Mavericks and former president of Nike Sports Management
- Gloria Nevarez, 1997 – Mountain West Conference commissioner (2023–present), West Coast Conference commissioner (2018–2022), and senior sports commissioner at the Pac-12 Conference, University of Oklahoma, UC Berkeley, and San Jose State University
- Greg Genske, 1998 – noted sports lawyer who serves as executive director, president, and lead negotiator of the Legacy Agency's baseball division
- Colin Allred, 2014 – linebacker for the Tennessee Titans of the National Football League

== Writing, radio, and television ==
=== Entertainment ===
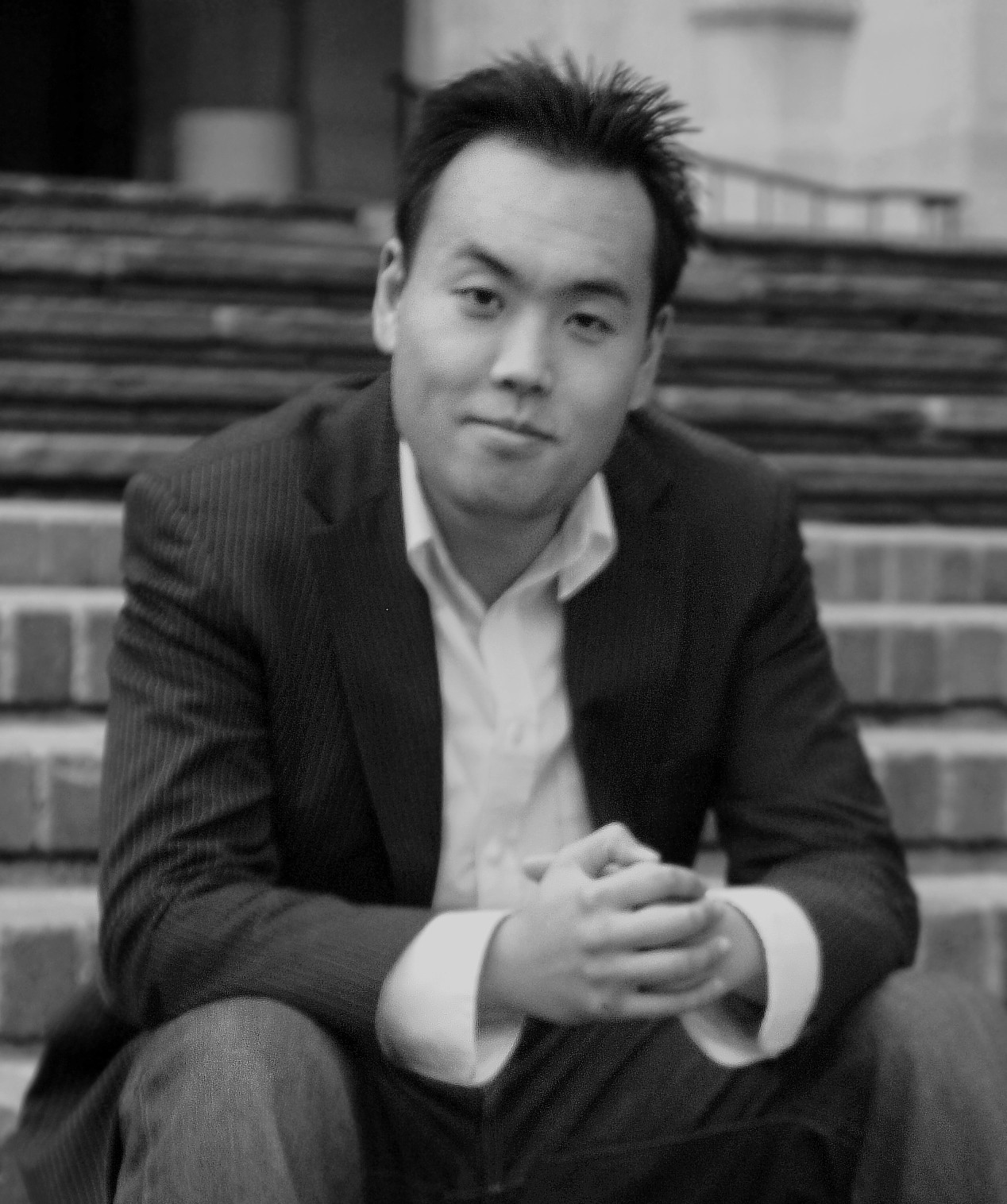
Timothy Tau LL.M. '17, notable writer, filmmaker and law professor

- Michael Raffetto, 1925 – actor who starred in NBC Radio series One Man's Family and I Love a Mystery
- Jonathan Shapiro, 1990 – award-winning television writer and producer of Boston Legal and The Practice and creator of the television show Goliath
- Will Youmans, 2003 – hip-hop artist and Arab-American television personality
- Jeff Rake, 1993 – television writer and creator of the shows Manifest and The Mysteries of Laura

=== Journalism ===
- Motoyuki Negoro, 1903 – strike leader and journalist for the Nippu Jiji and Hawaii Hochi
- Harlan G. Palmer, 1913 – publisher and owner of the Hollywood Citizen
- Frank Mankiewicz, 1995 – president of National Public Radio (1977–1983)
- Jerry Brady, 1962 – president and publisher of the Post Register
- Andrew Drzemczewski, 1974 (LL.M.) – legal correspondent for The London Times
- Jim Lobe, 1974 – Washington Bureau Chief, Inter Press Service (1980–1985, 1989–)
- Gary Pruitt, 1982 – president and CEO of the Associated Press (2012–) and former CEO (1996–2012), president (1995–2012), and board chairman (2001–2012) of McClatchy
- Harry Litman, 1986 – contributing columnist and opinion writer, The Washington Post, Los Angeles Times, The New York Times, and The Wall Street Journal; legal commentator on MSNBC, CNN, and Fox News; founder of the podcast Talking Feds
- Jennifer Rubin, 1986 – notable conservative columnist for The Washington Post, Commentary, PJ Media, Human Events, and The Weekly Standard
- Jami Floyd, 1989 – award-winning broadcast journalist and legal analyst; host of All Things Considered for WNYC New York Public Radio
- Paul S. Edwards, 1991 (J.D.) and 1996 (Ph.D. in Jurisprudence and Social Policy) – editor, Deseret News
- Jess Bravin, 1997 – United States Supreme Court correspondent and California Editor, Wall Street Journal, and notable reporter for The Los Angeles Times, the Washington Post, Harper's Bazaar, and Spy magazine
- Susan J. Elliott, 2003 – media commentator and author
- Heather McGhee, 2009 – political commentator, strategist, and contributor to NBC News and MSNBC
- Jonathan Singer, 2010 – progressive blogger for MyDD

=== Literature ===
- John S. Martel, 1960 – New York Times best-selling novelist
- David M. Alexander, 1970 – author of science fiction and mystery novels
- Leslie S. Klinger, 1971 – award-winning literary editor and annotator of classic genre fiction who also practices tax, real estate and business law
- Kelly Moore, 1982 – New York Times bestselling author of the books Deadly Medicine and Amber House
- Margaret Wilkerson Sexton, 2009 – NAACP Image and American Library Association award-winning author featured in The New York Times and Parade magazine
