= Helane Morrison =

American lawyer

Helane L. Morrison
- Education: Northwestern University (BS); UC Berkeley School of Law (JD)
- Occupations: Lawyer, businessperson
- Years active: 1984–present
- Known for: General Counsel, CCO and Managing Director at Hall Capital Partners LLC

Helane Morrison is an American businesswoman, lawyer and former regional director of the U.S. Securities and Exchange Commission. She has served as general counsel and chief compliance officer at Hall Capital Partners LLC since 2007.

== Early life and education ==
Morrison was born in Brooklyn, New York and received her bachelor's degree in journalism from Northwestern University. Morrison attended the University of California, Berkeley, School of Law where she was editor-in-chief of the California Law Review and earned her Juris Doctor in 1984. She was accepted to the State Bar of California in 1987.

== Career ==
Morrison began her law career in 1984 as a law clerk for Richard A. Posner of the United States Court of Appeals for the Seventh Circuit. In 1985, she served as a law clerk for Harry Blackmun of the United States Supreme Court. In 1986, Morrison joined the law firm of Howard, Rice, Nemerovski, Canady, Falk & Rabkin based in San Francisco. Morrison was named a partner of the firm in 1991 and remained with the firm until 1996.

Morrison joined the SEC in 1996 as the head of regional enforcement activities for the San Francisco District Office (later renamed the San Francisco Regional Office). In 1999, she was promoted to head of the office with the title of district administrator and then regional director. Morrison was responsible for overseeing the enforcement and examination programs under the office's jurisdiction, including Northern California, Oregon, Alaska, Montana, Idaho, Washington and Northern Nevada. Under Morrison, the San Francisco office brought several high-profile cases including fraud cases involving a subsidiary of McKesson HBOC and NextCard, as well as other cases alleging insider trading, violations by investment advisers and brokers, and the defrauding of senior citizens.

Morrison joined Hall Capital Partners LLC, a private investment company, in 2007 to serve as general counsel and chief compliance officer. She also serves as a managing director and member of the executive committee.

== See also ==
- List of law clerks for the second seat of the Supreme Court of the United States
