= Frederick Hertz =

- Born: 26 March 1878; Vienna, Austria
- Died: 20 November 1964 (aged 86); London, England
- Other names: Friedrich (Otto) Hertz, Germanus Liber
- Occupations: Sociologist, economist, historian

Frederick Hertz (until 1946 Friedrich (Otto) Hertz, a pseudonym also: Germanus Liber; * 26 March 1878 in Vienna, † 20 November 1964 in London) was a British sociologist, economist and historian of Austrian origin.

== Life and work ==
Hertz attended the Franz-Joseph-Gymnasium in Vienna and studied after the Matura (1897) law and economics at the University of Vienna. From 1901 to 1902, he continued his studies at the Ludwig-Maximilians-Universität München, In 1903, he was at the University of Vienna with a thesis on the discount and foreign exchange policy of the Austro-Hungarian Bank (1892–1902) PhD. During his studies, Hertz joined the Austrian Social Democrats.

Before graduation, he already worked as a freelance writer in Vienna. This he put on after the promotion. From 1905 to 1906, he was the editor of The Way. Weekly journal of politics and culture (Vienna-Leipzig). Then, he worked for a trade association and a Swiss insurance company. In 1914, he married Edith Hirsch, a physician, with whom he had two children.

In First World War, Friedrich Otto Hertz served in the Austro-Hungarian army, in the last two years of war in the Scientific Committee for the war economy of the k.u.k. War Ministry in Vienna. In the first twelve post-war years (up until 1930), Hertz worked as a Counselor with the title of a counselor at the Austrian Federal Chancellery in Vienna. He served as department head, in particular on the improvement of the relations of Austria to the UK, the US and with the successor states of the Austro-Hungarian monarchy and trade.

1930-1933 Hertz was a professor of world economy and sociology at the University of Halle-Wittenberg in Halle an der Saale (Saxony-Anhalt). After the takeover by the Nazis, he was dismissed from service (1 May 1933) and fled to Vienna, where he lived until 1938 as a private scholar. He was attacked by the Nazi regime as a "Jew, Freemason and pacifist" for his publications on issues of race and nationality.

In April 1938 he emigrated with his family to London and in 1946 he received British citizenship under the name of Frederick Hertz. During the war and postwar years he was active in leading positions in Austrian émigré organizations. Until his death he lived as a private scholar in London who gave lectures and talks.

== Selected works ==
- Modern theories of race (1904)
- Race and Civilization (1915)
- The production base of Austrian Industry (1918)
- Balance of payments viability and Austria (1925)
- Capital needs, capital and national income in Austria (1929)
- Nationality in History and Politics (1944)
- The economic problem of the Danubian States (1947)
- The Development of the German Public Mind, 3 volumes (1957–62)
