= John Martel (novelist) =

American novelist

John S. Martel is an American lawyer and novelist.

A former Air Force pilot, Martel graduated with a law degree from the University of California, Berkeley School of Law. He joined the San Francisco firm of Farella Braun & Martel in 1964. He has tried over a hundred trials, losing just four, and consulted for the Los Angeles District Attorney's Office on both the O. J. Simpson and Menendez trials. He successfully represented Robert Mondavi in the landmark case of Mondavi vs. Mondavi. He obtained the then-highest verdict in Virginia history in V.I.P. vs. SCM Corporation and successfully defended the Hearst Corporation in a three-month federal jury case, Pacific Sun vs. The Chronicle, the Examiner, et al. He is a former Regent of the American College of Trial Lawyers and has been frequently listed in Best Lawyers of American and Super Lawyer magazine. The "National Law Journal" listed him among the Top Ten Trial Lawyers in America. In 1988, he was awarded the San Francisco City and County Certificate of Honor by the Board of Supervisors in recognition of his achievement as a national trial lawyer and his work in behalf of the homeless. He entered the world of fiction in 1988 with the courtroom thriller Partners and followed that in 1995 with Conflicts of Interest. All of his novels, including The Alternate and Billy Strobe have been either regional or New York Times bestsellers. His most recent novel is "The American Lawyer," published in 2012. A former college athlete, Martel won the 100 meter hurdles in the U.S. National Masters Track and Field Championships in 1997, running the fastest time in the world for his age group.

== Bibliography ==
- Partners (1988)
- Conflicts of Interest (1995)
- The Alternate (1999)
- Billy Strobe (2001)
- The American Lawyer (2012)
- Driven: Investigating Nine Decades of Stop-at-Nothing Ambition (2024)
- "Now and Then" (CD—2008) original pop-rock songs performed by the composer
- "Country Hound" (CD—2008) original country-rock songs performed by the composer
