= Steven Ferrey =

Steven Ferrey is a contracts and environmental law professor at Suffolk University. He is the author of a contract and environmental law book, entitled Aspen, Examples and Explanations. He received his JD from University of California Berkeley and has been a full-time professor since 1989.

== Career ==
Currently, Ferrey is a Senior Counsel at the National Consumer Law Center as well as a professor at Suffolk University Law School.

He has served as a public member on a White House policy review panel (1978–79); as an advisor to the Office of Technology Assessment of the U.S. Congress; and as a member of the Governor's talk force on hazardous waste for the State of Massachusetts.

== Education ==
Ferrey received his BA from Pomona College and got his MA and JD from the University of California, Berkeley.

== Subjects ==
His subject expertise is in contracts, environmental law, and energy law.

== Articles ==
He has authored the following articles throughout his tenure:

- U.S. Carbon Regulation, in CLIMATE CHANGE: A GUIDE TO CARBON LAW AND PRACTICE (Global Law and Business, Paul Watchman ed., 2008)
- Renewable and Decentralized Energy Options: State Promotion in the U.S., in ENCYCLOPEDIA OF ENERGY ENGINEERING AND TECHNOLOGY (Barney L. Capehart ed., 2007)
- Net Metering, in ENCYCLOPEDIA OF ENERGY ENGINEERING AND TECHNOLOGY (Barney L. Capehart ed., 2007)
- Officer and Director Liability for Environmental Law Violations, in MINIMIZING LIABILITY FOR HAZARDOUS WASTE MANAGEMENT. (1998) (with Michael P. Last) (ALI-ABA Course of Study)
- Chapter, in ENCYCLOPEDIA OF THE CONSUMER MOVEMENT (1997)
- Financing, in IMPLEMENTATION OF SOLAR THERMAL TECHNOLOGY (1997)
- Chapter, in 18:1 PUBLIC UTILITIES LAW ANTHOLOGY (1995)
- Introduction, in XV (PT 1) PUBLIC UTILITIES LAW ANTHOLOGY (1993)
- The Successful Project: The Power Market, Economics and Tax Aspects, in HOT TOPICS IN GOVERNMENT REGULATION (Suffolk Univ. Law School Advanced Legal Studies, 1993)
- Chapter, in VENTURE CAPITAL MANUAL (Warren, Gorham & Lamont, 1990) (Lee, ed.)
