= Theresia Degener =

Theresia Degener (born 10 April 1961 in Altenberge, West Germany) is a jurist and professor of law at the Protestant University for Applied Sciences of the Rheinland-Westfalen-Lippe.

Degener is well known for being an outspoken victim of the Contergan Skandal, also known as the thalidomide disaster/tragedy, which makes reference to the drug thalidomide first marketed in 1957 in West Germany under the trade-name Contergan. The drug, first described as a mild sleeping aid, caused thousands of babies worldwide to be born with malformed limbs.

She is also a lead activist of the rights of Persons With Disabilities, and is the Chairperson of the UN Committee on the Rights of Persons with Disabilities.

She is also a member of the Human Rights Initiative Advisory Board of the Open Society Foundation.

== Education and personal life ==
Theresia Degener graduated from UC Berkeley School of Law, has worked at the Dutch Coalition on Disability and Development (DCDD) and is a Legal Expert advisor to the German Government. For her commitment to the Convention on the Rights of Persons with Disabilities and her contributions to advancing the rights of persons with disabilities, she was awarded in 2014 with the Order of Merit of the Federal Republic of Germany, by then-Federal President Horst Köhler.

Degener is married and has two children.
