= Andrew Drzemczewski =

Andrew (Andrzej Zbigniew) Drzemczewski (born 7 July 1951) is the former head of the Legal Affairs and Human Rights Department of the Parliamentary Assembly of the Council of Europe, Strasbourg, France.; visiting professor, School of Law, Middlesex University London since 2016.

== Education and professional qualifications ==
After having obtained his LL.B. law degree at the London School of Economics in 1972, he spent a year at the University of Warsaw, at its department of international law, as a British Council Scholar (1972–73), rounding of this cycle of studies at the UC Berkeley School of Law where he obtained an LL.M in International Law (Fulbright Research Scholar).

He subsequently returned to the LSE where he obtained, in 1981, his PhD, which was published by the Oxford University Press in 1983: European Human Rights Convention in Domestic Law: A Comparative Study. He also obtained, in 1974, the Diploma of the Strasbourg-based International Institute of Human Rights and was called to the English Bar in 1985 (member of the Honourable Society of the Middle Temple, London).

== Career at the Council of Europe ==
He worked for the Council of Europe since 1985.

As of April 2005, until his departure in 2016, he was head of the Legal Affairs & Human Rights Department of the Parliamentary Assembly of the Council of Europe.

Previous in-house experience includes work in the then Directorate of Human Rights (having worked on the reform of the European Convention on Human Rights between the years 1987 and 1994; he also headed a newly created section for co-operation with countries of Central and Eastern Europe, and was secretary to an ad hoc committee of experts responsible directly to the Committee of Ministers on CSCE (now OSCE), Human Dimension issues. He had principal responsibility for the organization of a ministerial conference on Human Rights, held in Rome in 1990).

Between the years 1995 and 1997 he was secretary to an informal working party on Protocol No.11 to the European Convention on Human Rights, under the co-chairmanship of the Deputy Secretary General (Peter Leuprecht) & the president of the European Court of Human Rights (Rolv Ryssdal), before becoming, in 1996, the head of the secretary general's Monitoring Unit, with responsibility to set up and launch the Committee of Ministers confidential monitoring procedure (compliance with commitments accepted by member States of the Council of Europe).

== Other functions/activities ==
Since 1986 he has been legal correspondent for "The Times" newspaper, London (Human Rights Law Reports, Strasbourg) and well over 400 of his law reports have been published to-date.

He is also a member of the Administrative Council of the International Institute of Human Rights, Strasbourg; member of Scientific Advisory Board of the European Yearbook on Human Rights and a member of the advisory board of the European Human Rights Association. Between 1994 and 2021 he was a visiting professor at the University of Strasbourg's Faculty of Law.

== Other professional experience ==
Before joining the Council of Europe in September 1985, Dr Drzemczewski undertook various types of legal work (within governmental and NGO circles), lecturing and consultancies around the world (inter alia, legal consultant to the Gulf Co-operation Council in 1981; legal advice and assistance in international human rights litigation to several NGOs, including the first-ever 3rd party intervention – by the POEU – in the case of Malone v UK (1984) before the European Court of Human Rights. He was also a founding member of INTERIGHTS.

From 1979 to 1985 he was senior lecturer in law at what is now the Metropolitan University, in London. For a period of 14 years (from 1981 to 1994) he taught “International Law of Human Rights” at the University of Notre Dame’s Summer Law Program in London (& was an Associate Professor at the University’s London Law Centre year-round program from 1982 to 1985).

== Publications ==
- European Human Rights Convention in Domestic Law. A Comparative Study (Oxford University Press, 1983 and 1985; reprinted in 1997)
- Human Rights: Cases and Materials (3 volumes, teaching material for students, London, 1982)
- "A major overhaul of the European Human Rights Convention control mechanism: Protocol No. 11", in Collected Courses of the Academy of European Law / Recueil des cours de l'Académie de Droit européen, Vol.VI (European University Institute, Florence – Martinus Nijhoff, 1995), Book 2, 1997.
- "The Council of europe and the Issue of Incorporation", Human rights in domestic law and development assistance policies of the Nordic countries, Martinus Nijhoff Publishers, 1989, ISBN 978-90-247-3743-7

He also co-edited "Domestic Implementation of the European Convention on Human Rights in Eastern and Western Europe", in volume 2 of the All-European Human Rights Yearbook (Engel Verlag 1992) 251 pages (French version issued in a special volume, No.4, of Revue Universelle des Droits de l'Homme, 1992).

'The election of judges to the European Court of Human Rights,' December 2025 - online https://opil.ouplaw.com/display/10.1093/law-mpeipro/e3367.013.3367/law-mpeipro-e3367

https://cons.judicial.gov.tw/docdata.aspx?fid=89&id=117082 2018 - video (later published: 'The role & authority of the ECtHR,' in Arabic Review… 2018 https://acihl.org/review.htm ).

- "Exclusion of the Russian Federation from the Council of Europe and the ECHR: an Overview", co-authored with Rick Lawson, in Baltic Yearbook of International Law, Vol. 21, 2022 (Brill/Nijhoff, 2023).

He has published widely and has written over 200 articles and case-notes on international and comparative law issues in numerous legal periodicals, with particular reference to human rights in Europe (in addition to the Human Rights Law Report, he writes regularly for The Times newspaper – see above).
