= Ken DeLeon =

Ken DeLeon (born July 13, 1972) is a Silicon Valley realtor, innovator, public speaker, philanthropist, and former attorney. He was born in Fort Lauderdale, Florida, and now resides in Palo Alto, California.

== Early life ==
DeLeon was born in Fort Lauderdale, Florida on July 13, 1972. DeLeon was 15 when his sister and only sibling — Jane, who helped raise him in Boca Raton, Florida — committed suicide in 1987.

== College and career ==
DeLeon earned a degree in mathematics and economics from the University of California, Santa Barbara, and graduated from the University of California, Berkeley, School of Law (Boalt Hall). After law school, he practiced law at Wilson Sonsini Goodrich & Rosati, a firm in Palo Alto catering to technology, life sciences, and other types of companies worldwide. DeLeon left the practice of law to work in real estate, and became an agent at Keller Williams Realty at its Palo Alto office. In June 2012, REAL Trends, Inc. and the Wall Street Journal announced that DeLeon was the nation's #1 real estate agent out of over 1.2 million agents, and the only Silicon Valley agent to ever be ranked the nation's top agent. Within three years, in June 2015, REAL Trends, Inc. and the Wall Street Journal announced that "The DeLeon Team", headed by DeLeon, was the nation's #1 real estate team.

San Jose Mercury News described DeLeon as "Silicon Valley's Real Estate Rockstar." Forbes referred to him as the "Top Silicon Valley Sales Agent."
