= Public-Private Partnership for Justice Reform in Afghanistan =

The Public-Private Partnership for Justice Reform in Afghanistan (PPP) is an organization established by the United States Department of State as a joint initiative with US private attorneys to provide support to the Afghan legal community. It was established by Condoleezza Rice in 2007 and continued under Hillary Clinton.

The PPP administers the Afghan LLM Scholarship Program to sponsor Afghan lawyers and judges to study abroad. The intent is for scholars to return and apply their skills in the Afghan legal sector. Members of the executive committee mentor the LLM Scholars and lead legal workshops in Afghanistan.
