= Eleanor Nisperos =

American lawyer

Eleanor Oducayen Nisperos is California’s first Filipina American female lawyer.

She completed her undergraduate education at the University of Hawaiʻi, and earned her law degree in 1971 from Boalt Hall University of California, Berkeley. The following year, she became the first Filipina admitted to practice law in California.

Nisperos served as the first president of the Filipino Bar Association of Northern California (FBANC) from 1981-1982. She initially worked as a Deputy Attorney General in San Francisco, California, before serving as an administrative law judge and presiding judge for the California Unemployment Insurance Appeal Board until her retirement. From 2007 to 2011, Nisperos served as Deputy Attorney General for the Northern Mariana Islands’ Office of the Attorney General.

== See also ==
- List of first women lawyers and judges in California
