= Judge Whelan =

Judge Whelan may refer to:

- Francis C. Whelan (1907–1991), judge of the United States District Courts for the Central and Southern Districts of California
- Máire Whelan (born 1956), judge of the Court of Appeal of Ireland
- Thomas J. Whelan (judge) (born 1940), judge of the United States District Court for the Southern District of California
