= People v. Lazarus =

2015 decision by the California Court of Appeals

- Court: California Court of Appeals
- Full case name: The People of the State of California, Plaintiff and Respondent v. Stephanie Ilene Lazaraus, Defendant and Appellant.
- Decided: July 13, 2015
- Citations: 238 Cal.App.4th 734, 190 Cal.Rptr.3d 195

Court membership
- Judges sitting: Audrey B. Collins, Thomas Willhite Jr. and Nora Margaret Manella

Case opinions
- Majority: Manella, joined by Collins, Willhite

People v. Lazarus, 238 Cal.App.4th 734, is a 2015 decision by the California Court of Appeals affirming the murder conviction of former Los Angeles police officer Stephanie Lazarus three years earlier. Lazarus, charged with killing a former love interest's wife in 1986; the crime had for years been believed to have been a botched burglary until it was reinvestigated in the late 2000s. She had argued that the age of some of the evidence used against her made it too stale to be used against her. She also cited issues with the search warrant and some of the evidence obtained, as well as violations of her due process rights during the investigation. Lastly Lazarus argued that she should have been allowed to introduce evidence that pointed to other suspects.

A panel of three judges unanimously held for the state on all those issues. In the opinion, Nora Margaret Manella identified no error by the trial court, and any that there might have been was harmless. Lazarus appealed to the state Supreme Court, which later in 2015 declined to hear the case. In 2018 she was automatically held liable for wrongful death, due to the conviction, in a civil suit brought by Rasmussen's parents. Lazarus continued to protest her innocence in the killing, but during a 2023 parole hearing admitted to it.

== Background ==
In February 1986, John Ruetten, a Southern California computer programmer, returned to his home in the Los Angeles neighborhood of Van Nuys from work one evening to find his wife, Sherri Rasmussen, a nursing supervisor at Glendale Adventist Hospital who taught classes at UCLA, dead on the floor, shot three times. The early investigation by the Los Angeles Police Department (LAPD) focused on evidence that suggested Rasmussen, who had stayed home from work that day, had interrupted a burglary in progress, leading the panicked thieves to shoot her and flee in her car, which was recovered 11 days later parked on a street two miles (3.2 km) away. The .38-caliber gun used was never recovered.

A bite mark on Rasmussen's shoulder complicated the burglary theory, as it suggested her assailant might have been female, while most burglars are men. No jewelry had been taken, but the recently-married couple's marriage certificate was. Rasmussen's parents tried to interest the police in Stephanie Lazarus, a former UCLA classmate of Ruetten's with a crush on him, as a suspect. She had later become a police officer herself, and Rasmussen had confided in her father Nels (but not her husband) about a confrontation with Lazarus over her marriage that led Nels to believe Lazarus was stalking Sherri. The LAPD detectives would not be dissuaded from their burglary theory and said Lazarus, whom Ruetten did not consider a suspect, had been cleared.

Beyond some efforts to match DNA from the blood evidence taken at the scene, there was little effort to investigate the cold case during the 1990s. In the early 2000s, DNA from the saliva in the bite mark turned out to have been left by a female, and later that decade detectives taking a fresh look at the case agreed Lazarus, by then an LAPD detective herself, was a strong suspect. Eventually a sample of her DNA was found to match that from the bite mark, and Lazarus was arrested in 2009 and charged with the murder after making admissions connecting her to it during a lengthy interview. She was convicted in 2012 after a trial that drew considerable media attention due to the length of time the case had gone unsolved, the love triangle element, and the defendant having herself been a serving police officer at the time of the crime up until her arrest, all of which seemed like aspects of fictional crime narratives.

== Trial ==
Over the next three years, Lazarus's lawyer Mark Overland filed motions to dismiss the case or exclude significant evidence. The first, in October 2009, sought to have the case, heard by Judge Robert J. Perry, dismissed on the grounds that the initial investigators had failed to identify Lazarus as a suspect. This failure had, the motion argued, affected Lazarus's due process rights adversely through the degradation of evidence, requiring dismissal under the truth-in-evidence provisions of the California Constitution. Prosecutors responded that Perry was required to apply federal standards, under which only an intentional delay could be considered prejudicial. Perry agreed, and let the case proceed.

Following that denial, Overland moved to quash the search warrants executed on Lazarus's home, vehicle and spaces she used at work, and suppress evidence from them. They were, he argued, based on stale information that did not sufficiently establish a nexus between the places searched and the likelihood of finding evidence there. Perry admitted he was "uncomfortable" admitting some of the seized evidence, in particular from Lazarus's personal computers and other electronic storage devices at her home, since either she had not had them or they had not existed at the time of Rasmussen's death. He deferred to the judge who issued the search warrants; thus, the good-faith exception to the exclusionary rule applied and all the evidence could be admitted.

Overland's next motion, heard late in 2010, sought to bar the use of Lazarus's statements during her Parker Center interview. He argued that, per the Garrity warning usually given to government employees under investigation, (Note: The warning, derived from the U.S. Supreme Court's holding in Garrity v. New Jersey that government employees whose terms of employment require them to cooperate with internal investigations retain their Fifth Amendment rights against compelled self-incrimination, but can still be disciplined by their employers for their refusal to cooperate, balances the state's interest in conducting thorough investigations of possible employee misconduct with the constitutional rights of the employees under investigation.) California law compelled her to answer questions as a police officer or face disciplinary action for refusing to cooperate with an investigation, entitling her to automatic use immunity for those answers. Perry sided with the prosecution, who argued that Garrity only applied where there was an active administrative proceeding, not the case at the time.

A year later, Perry denied the last of Overland's significant pretrial motions. Overland argued that MiniFiler, a new product to type Lazarus's DNA, differed enough from previous technology that she was entitled to a Frye hearing (Note: The Frye standard is a legal test to determine whether a particular technology used to obtain evidence is reliable enough to admit that evidence. It was established by Frye v. United States, a 1923 case where the prosecution sought to introduce evidence that the defendants' systolic blood pressure rose when he denied participation in a murder, suggesting he was being untruthful; the D.C. Circuit federal appeals court affirmed a lower-court ruling that that test had not yet gained enough supporting consensus among scientists to be admissible. It has since been superseded at the federal level by the Supreme Court's holding in Daubert v. Merrell Dow Pharmaceuticals, Inc. that the Federal Rules of Evidence set the standard for the admissibility of such evidence. Most states have followed suit, though some continue to use Frye. At the time of Lazarus's trial, California was one of them; in 2012, the California Supreme Court adopted a standard more in line with Daubert.) to determine whether its results were of sufficient scientific validity. Perry ruled that it was just another form of the PCR method commonly used to test DNA.

Trial began in early 2012. The prosecution built its circumstantial case around several pieces of evidence. The DNA from the saliva collected from the bite mark linked Lazarus to the crime, they argued. They further cited Lazarus's backup .38-caliber handgun as the likely source of the bullets. She had reported it lost to the Santa Monica police two weeks after the killing but not, as LAPD regulations required, to her own department, even though she had reported buying an apparent replacement for it to the department a month after the killing. Lastly the prosecution pointed to some of the statements in her pre-arrest interview to suggest that she was not over Ruetten's marriage to Rasmussen at the time and that she knew more about the case than she had initially claimed to.

In cross-examining the detectives and other technicians who had originally investigated the killing, Overland stressed the original burglary theory and pointed to evidence, such as the similar burglary that happened shortly thereafter, that he claimed supported it. He also highlighted evidence not analyzed, such as a bloody fingerprint on one of the walls, to suggest that other suspects had not been adequately excluded. He questioned whether it could be inferred that the weapon used was Lazarus's lost gun, as .38s were in wide use. Since the DNA from the bite mark was central to the prosecution's case, he attacked it vigorously, pointing to improper storage procedures and a hole the tube had left in an envelope that he said could have allowed Lazarus's DNA to be added to it later.

Overland presented his case-in-chief over two days, disputing the prosecution's theme of a lovelorn Lazarus. He presented friends of hers who denied that she was showing any signs of violence or despondence over her failed relationship with Ruetten at the time of the killing. Contemporary excerpts from her diary where Lazarus wrote of dating several different men were entered into evidence. Overland also reinforced his attack on the forensic evidence, calling as his last witness a fingerprint expert who said that some prints at the scene did not match Lazarus's.

Both prosecution and defense reiterated their themes in closing arguments. After showing the jury photographs of a beaten, bloodied Rasmussen, prosecutor Paul Nunez described Rasmussen as "prey caught in a cage with a predator." Overland dismissed the entire case as "fluff and fill", save for the "compromised" bite-mark DNA sample. He moved for a mistrial after Nunez reminded the jurors that Lazarus had provided no alibi for the time of the murder, since defendants' refusal to testify cannot be held against them. Perry denied this motion, saying he did not take Nunez's statement as directly suggesting Lazarus had refused to testify and thus her Fifth Amendment right against self-incrimination had not been violated.

In March, after several days of deliberations, the jury convicted Lazarus of first-degree murder. Later that month, she was sentenced to 27 years to life in prison. As of 2025 Lazarus is serving her sentence at the California Institution for Women in Corona.

== Appeal ==
Lazarus appealed her conviction in May 2013. Her attorney, Donald Tickle, argued that Perry had erred in ruling for the prosecution on all pretrial motions. Multiple precedents supported the defense arguments over the prosecution, Tickle said, and sometimes directly contradicted them. For instance, it had been held that the state cannot rely purely on the warrant's issuance by a judge to establish sufficient good faith that the search was constitutional. Perry, Tickle said, had also misread the primary California case Overland had relied on as not applying to evidence of third-party culpability in excluding evidence about the other burglary. But Tickle said other cases made clear the statute it interpreted did indeed cover that, and imposed a lower standard of admission than "remarkable similarities". The use of a .38 caliber weapon and a similar residence in both burglaries established a strong possibility of a common modus operandi for both crimes, Tickle said.

As a result of this ruling, Overland had been denied the opportunity to cross-examine Mark Safarik, an FBI expert on burglaries who testified last, telling the jury that the crime scene suggested a staged burglary, as opposed to a real one interrupted in progress. Since the prosecution had told the court at a sidebar prior to Safarik's testimony that they intended to limit their questioning to supporting this theory, Perry similarly limited the defense on cross. However, Tickle argued, since Safarik's own report had considered the other burglary, testimony about that should have been allowed.

=== Decision ===
A panel of three judges—Audrey B. Collins, Thomas Willhite Jr. and Nora Margaret Manella—heard oral argument in the case in June 2015. A month later, they unanimously upheld Lazarus's conviction.

The court's primary holding was that Lazarus and her attorneys had failed to establish that Perry's rulings resulted in any prejudice to her ability to mount an effective defense. Manella, writing for the panel, conceded at the outset that Perry had incorrectly agreed with the prosecution that delays resulting from negligence or neglect alone could not be considered prejudicial—in fact, she said, federal and state precedent called for a balancing test when there was evidence that an unintended delay in prosecution might adversely affect the defendant's ability to challenge the state's case. But in the instant case, she found that the state's explanations for the delays were reasonable enough, and that in turn Lazarus had not shown any reasonable likelihood of prejudice resulting from missing evidence and unavailable witnesses. "[The trial court]'s error did not affect the outcome", Manella wrote, pertaining to the absence of chain of custody records for the evidence. "As [it] observed, the passage of time was more likely prejudicial to the prosecution than the defense."

Perry had also properly denied the defense motion to suppress evidence obtained from the searches, since they were based on reasonable assumptions about possibly incriminating evidence that might still be in those places over two decades after the crime, per case law. Since none of the information in the search-warrant affidavit was known to be false or shown to have been stated with reckless disregard for its truth, the good-faith exception was validly applied.

"Appellant appears to believe that Garrity applies to any statement made by a police officer during an interview conducted by fellow law enforcement officials", Manella wrote with regard to Lazarus's interview. But it applies only to information coerced under the threat of termination in criminal investigations, as opposed to statements given where an officer "had no objectively reasonable basis to believe she was compelled to answer", as Perry had found. Lazarus had not been ordered to submit to the interview nor were Stearns and Jamarillo in her usual chain of command, or working for the LAPD's internal affairs unit. "The fact that she remained in the room answering questions does not support that she felt compelled, but only that she wished to allay suspicion by avoiding behaving in a manner that suggested guilt." Manella called Lazarus's argument that, regardless of what did or did not happen in the interview, California law compelled her to answer truthfully or be disciplined, a "novel proposition" that relied strongly on a case decided in 1939, 30 years before Garrity. That decision, while still good law, had been limited by Garrity and subsequent California law. "Appellant, herself a former internal affairs officer, would have been aware that in the absence of a formal complaint or the explicit advisement required ... she was under no danger of termination if she refused to cooperate". Nor did California's Public Safety Officers' Procedural Bill of Rights Act requiring officers to cooperate apply, since courts had previously held it applied only to administrative inquiries, not criminal investigations.

The panel agreed with Perry that the MiniFiler DNA kit was not sufficiently different from previous DNA test kits to have required a separate hearing on that issue—or that if it were, the defense had not offered sufficient evidence that it was. "[Lazarus] quoted the manufacturer's Website representing that MiniFiler would obtain DNA results from compromised samples that previously would have yielded limited genetic data," Manella observed, "but the fact that the company's marketing material promised that its product was better than other comparable products does not establish that this was a new methodology." Since the defense had not requested hearings on whether the DNA had been handled properly, it could not raise those issues on appeal. Even if it could have, the panel held that the DNA evidence was not so critical to the case that its exclusion would have made an acquittal more likely. Finally, the panel held, Perry properly limited the scope of Overland's cross-examination of Safarik. The differences between the later burglary nearby and the apparent one at the Ruetten home outweighed the similarities. "Cross-examining Safarik about a specific burglary that occurred on a later date in a different location would have had little bearing on the validity of his opinions and conclusions concerning the Rasmussen crime scene", Manella wrote.

The California Supreme Court declined to hear Lazarus's appeal.

== Subsequent developments ==
In the early 2020s, California passed a law allowing special consideration for parole for offenders who were under 26 when they had committed the crimes they were convicted of. Lazarus was eligible, and in 2023 applied for parole before she would otherwise have been able to. At the initial suitability hearing, she admitted to killing Rasmussen, which she had previously denied. The panel hearing it voted to grant her parole, but it was later rescinded by the full board after Governor Gavin Newsom ordered the decision reviewed. A 2025 request was denied after testimony from Ruetten and Rasmussen's surviving family about the lasting impact of her murder on their lives. The prosecutors in Lazarus's case also disputed her account of the crime, which she had described as a confrontation that grew physical to the point of her shooting Rasmussen, pointing to evidence that there had not been any protracted struggle and that the shooting had been planned.
