= Olin Wellborn =

American politician and judge (1843–1921)

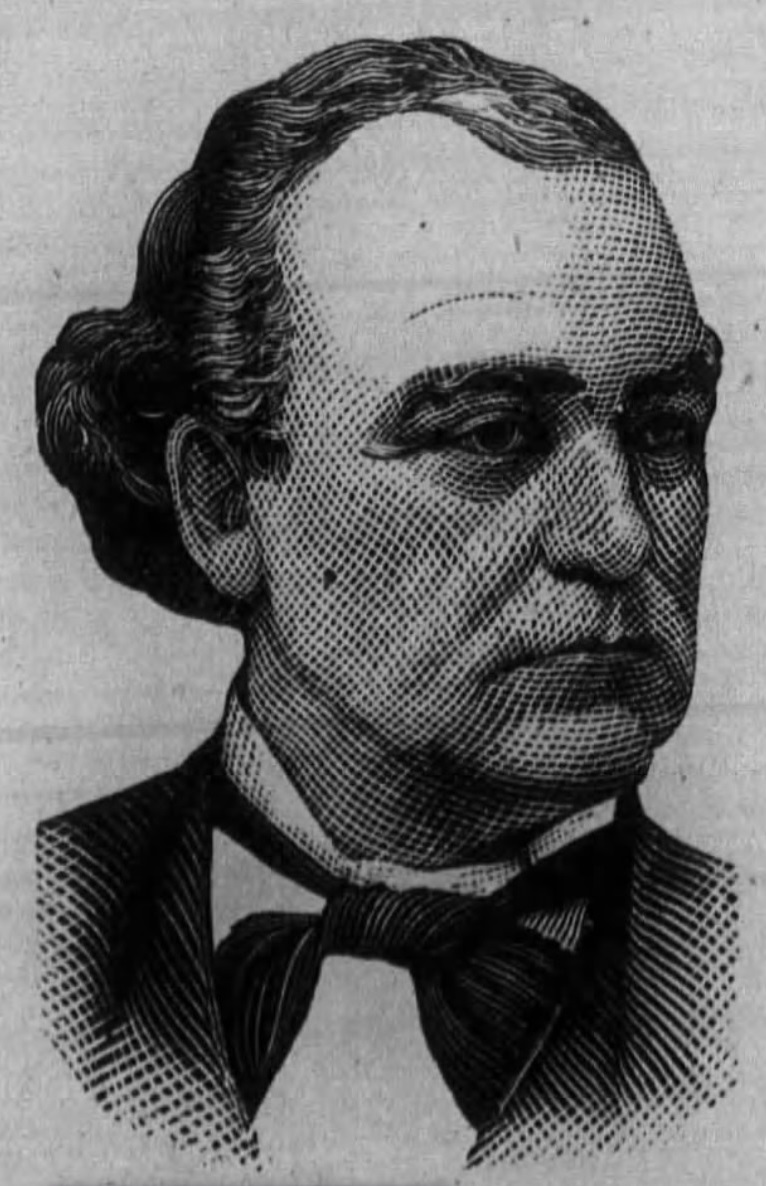
- Buffalo Weekly Express, January 21, 1886

Judge of the United States District Court for the Southern District of California
- In office March 1, 1895 – January 31, 1915
- Appointed by: Grover Cleveland
- Preceded by: Erskine Mayo Ross
- Succeeded by: Oscar A. Trippet

Member of the U.S. House of Representatives from Texas's 6th district
- In office March 4, 1883 – March 3, 1887
- Preceded by: Christopher C. Upson
- Succeeded by: Joseph Abbott

Member of the U.S. House of Representatives from Texas's 3rd district
- In office March 4, 1879 – March 3, 1883
- Preceded by: James W. Throckmorton
- Succeeded by: James H. Jones

Personal details
- Born: June 18, 1843 Cumming, Georgia, U.S.
- Died: December 6, 1921 (aged 78) Los Angeles, California, U.S.
- Resting place: Rosedale Cemetery; Los Angeles, California
- Party: Democratic
- Relations: Burton E. Green (son-in-law)
- Education: University of North Carolina at Chapel Hill; Emory University
- Occupation: Attorney

Military service
- Allegiance: Confederate States of America
- Branch/service: Confederate States Army
- Years of service: 1861–1865
- Rank: Captain
- Unit: 4th Georgia Cavalry
- Battles/wars: American Civil War

Olin Wellborn (June 18, 1843 – December 6, 1921) was a United States representative from Texas and a United States district judge of the United States District Court for the Southern District of California.

== Education and career ==
Born on June 18, 1843, in Cumming, Forsyth County, Georgia, Wellborn attended the common schools, the University of North Carolina at Chapel Hill and graduated from Emory University in 1862. He enlisted in the Confederate States Army in 1861 and served throughout the American Civil War, attaining the rank of captain in Company B, Fourth Georgia Cavalry. At the close of the war he settled in Atlanta, Georgia. He studied law, was admitted to the bar and entered private practice in Atlanta from 1866 to 1871. He continued private practice in Dallas, Texas starting in 1871.

== Congressional service ==
Wellborn was elected as a Democrat from Texas's 3rd congressional district and Texas's 6th congressional district to the United States House of Representatives of the 46th United States Congress and to the three succeeding Congresses, serving from March 4, 1879, to March 3, 1887. He was Chairman of the Committee on Indian Affairs for the 48th and 49th United States Congresses. He was an unsuccessful candidate for renomination in 1886 to the 50th United States Congress.

== Later career ==
Following his departure from Congress, Wellborn resumed private practice in San Diego, California from 1887 to 1893, and in Los Angeles, California starting in 1893.

== Federal judicial service ==
Wellborn was nominated by President Grover Cleveland on February 25, 1895, to a seat on the United States District Court for the Southern District of California vacated by Judge Erskine Mayo Ross. He was confirmed by the United States Senate on March 1, 1895, and received his commission the same day. His service terminated on January 31, 1915, due to his retirement.

== Death ==
Wellborn died on December 6, 1921, in Los Angeles. He was interred in Rosedale Cemetery (now Angelus-Rosedale Cemetery) in Los Angeles.

== Family ==
Wellborn's daughter married Burton E. Green, a co-founder of Beverly Hills, California.

== Sources ==
- United States Congress. "Olin Wellborn (id: W000272)". Biographical Directory of the United States Congress.
- "Wellborn, Olin - Federal Judicial Center". www.fjc.gov.
- This article incorporates public domain material from Biographical Directory of the United States Congress. Federal government of the United States.

U.S. House of Representatives
Preceded by James W. Throckmorton	Member of the U.S. House of Representatives from Texas's 3rd congressional district 1879–1883	Succeeded by James H. Jones
Preceded by Christopher C. Upson	Member of the U.S. House of Representatives from Texas's 6th congressional district 1883–1887	Succeeded by Joseph Abbott
Legal offices
Preceded by Erskine Mayo Ross	Judge of the United States District Court for the Southern District of California; 1895–1915	Succeeded by Oscar A. Trippet
