= Oscar A. Trippet =

American judge (1856–1923)

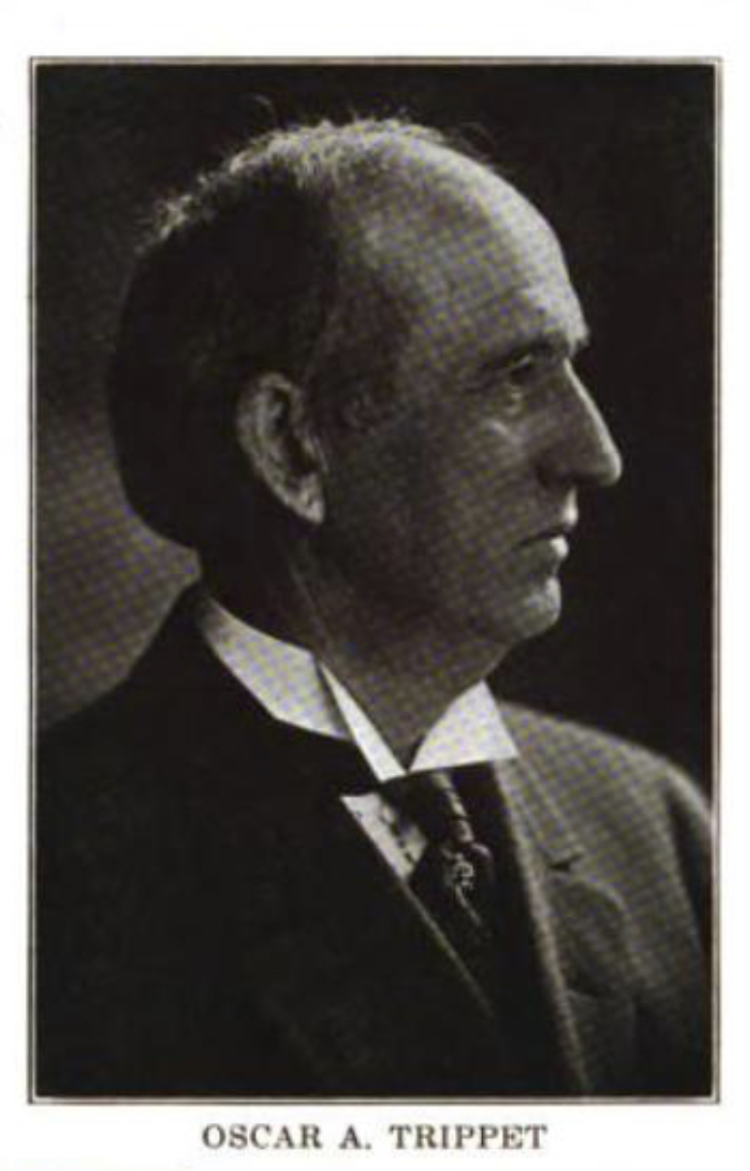

Judge of the United States District Court for the Southern District of California
- In office March 3, 1915 – July 15, 1923
- Appointed by: Woodrow Wilson
- Preceded by: Olin Wellborn
- Succeeded by: Paul John McCormick

Personal details
- Born: Oscar Alexander Trippet; March 6, 1856 Princeton, Indiana, U.S.
- Died: July 15, 1923 (aged 67) Lake Arrowhead, California, U.S.
- Education: Indiana State University, University of Virginia School of Law
- Occupation: Lawyer

Oscar A. Trippet (March 6, 1856 – July 15, 1923) was a United States district judge of the United States District Court for the Southern District of California. The Trippet Ranch gate of Topanga State Park is named for him, as his family owned the land through the first half of the 20th century.

== Education and career ==
Trippet attended local public schools, Indiana State Normal School, and the University of Virginia School of Law. Early in life he worked as a schoolteacher, farmer and high school principal. He entered private practice with his brother in Princeton from 1879 to 1887. He was a member of the Indiana Senate in 1886, elected on the Prohibition Party ticket and the youngest man elected to the state legislature to that time.

He moved to California in 1887 where he ran a private practice in San Diego, California from 1887 to 1901, and in Los Angeles, California from 1901 to 1915. His Los Angeles practice was Trippet, Chapman and Biby, in partnership with Ward Chapman, M. L. Chapman and J. E. Biby. The firm represented corporations including National Bank of California, California Vegetable Union, and the Economic Gas Company. One of his clients was Abbot Kinney, the storied founder of Venice of California. He was also chief counsel for the Home Telephone Company. He was president of the Los Angeles County Bar Association in 1911–12.

Trippet was nominated by President Woodrow Wilson on March 2, 1915, to a seat on the United States District Court for the Southern District of California vacated by Judge Olin Wellborn. He was confirmed by the United States Senate on March 3, 1915, and received his commission the same day. In 1916, Ambrose Collier was seated to a jury in Trippet's courtroom; Collier was "the first colored man to qualify in the history of the United States district court here for jury duty."

In 1917 he sentenced two members of the Ark of God cult to prison time. In 1919 he ruled on a patent case involving a machine and the peeling of peaches by use of caustic soda; the case had implications for the California produce business and canning industry. Also in 1919 he sentenced millionaire Hulett C. Merritt of Pasadena to five months in jail and a $5,000 fine for hoarding sugar in violation of wartime food restrictions. In 1920 he ruled that boxer Jack Johnson should be transported to Chicago from Los Angeles to face outstanding "white slavery" charges there. His service terminated on July 15, 1923, due to his death.

== Personal life ==
Born on March 6, 1856, in Princeton, Gibson County, Indiana, the son of Caleb and Mary Fentriss Trippet, Trippet was married to Cora Larimore of North Dakota in 1902. They had two children: Francis Oscar Trippet and Larimore Oscar Trippet.

Over Fourth of July weekend in 1892 Trippet was accidentally shot in the face by a friend during a hunting trip near Viejas Valley, California. The injuries were mostly superficial but there was some concern he would lose one eye. The cause of Judge Trippet's death was heart attack; he died during a weekend visit to a second home in Lake Arrowhead, San Bernardino, California. He was buried in Los Angeles. His estate was divided between his widow and only surviving son.

Judge Trippet's wife Cora was one of the founding organizers of the Hollywood Bowl. She died at age 94 in 1967. Trippet's son Oscar Trippet Jr. was a Stanford-educated lawyer who was involved in promoting the development of Los Angeles and civic organizations including the Hollywood Bowl Association and the Los Angeles Chamber of Commerce. Trippet's brother Will H. Trippet was a lawyer and judge in Montana.

The main entrance to Topanga State Park is named for Oscar Trippet and his family; they had owned the land that became "the centerpiece of the park." The land was acquired by the state of California in 1966. The family had previously donated an eight-acre section to the local Boy Scout Troop in honor of Judge Trippet's son, Larimore Oscar Trippet, who died young.

== Sources ==
Legal offices
Preceded by Olin Wellborn	Judge of the United States District Court for the Southern District of California; 1915–1923	Succeeded by Paul John McCormick
