= Jacqueline Nguyen =

American judge (born 1965)

- Nguyễn Hồng Ngọc
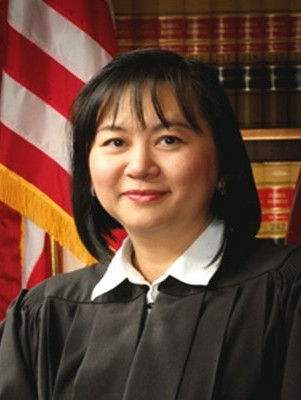

Judge of the United States Court of Appeals for the Ninth Circuit
- Incumbent
- Assumed office May 14, 2012
- Appointed by: Barack Obama
- Preceded by: Seat established

Judge of the United States District Court for the Central District of California
- In office December 4, 2009 – May 14, 2012
- Appointed by: Barack Obama
- Preceded by: Nora Margaret Manella
- Succeeded by: Fernando M. Olguin

Personal details
- Born: Hong-Ngoc Thi Nguyen; 1965 (age 60–61) Da Lat, South Vietnam (now Vietnam)
- Spouse: Pio Kim
- Education: Occidental College (BA); University of California, Los Angeles (JD)

Jacqueline Hong-Ngoc Nguyen (Vietnamese: Nguyễn Hồng Ngọc; born 1965) is an active United States circuit judge of the United States Court of Appeals for the Ninth Circuit, and the first Asian woman on a United States federal appellate court. She was identified as a potential Supreme Court nominee.

== Early life and education ==
Born Hong-Ngoc Thi Nguyen (Vietnamese: Nguyễn Thị Hồng Ngọc) in Da Lat, Vietnam, her father was a South Vietnamese Army major who had worked closely with U.S. intelligence officials during the Vietnam War, she has 6 siblings. Nguyen moved to the United States when she was 10 as a refugee, after the Fall of Saigon in 1975. She was airlifted with her family to Camp Pendleton where they lived in a tent city shelter and were provided support for several months before being resettled. They ultimately settled in the La Crescenta-Montrose area of Los Angeles. Her family later opened a doughnut shop in Glendale, California, where Nguyen worked everyday after school and the weekends to help her parents.

Nguyen earned her Bachelor of Arts degree in English in 1987 from Occidental College. She then earned a Juris Doctor from UCLA School of Law in 1991.

== Professional career ==
From 1991 until 1995, Nguyen worked in private law practice, specializing in civil litigation as a litigation associate at the firm Musick, Peeler & Garrett. In particular, she focused on commercial disputes, intellectual property and construction-defect cases. From 1995 until August 2002, Nguyen served as an Assistant United States Attorney in the Central District of California a federal trial court. She joined the U.S. Attorney's office in its Public Corruption and Government Fraud section, overseeing United States Department of Defense fraud prosecutions. In her final years in the U.S. Attorney's office, Nguyen also held the role of Deputy Chief of the General Crimes division, and trained new prosecutors in the Central District. In August 2002, Nguyen was appointed by then-California Gov. Gray Davis to be a Superior Court of Los Angeles County judge. Nguyen became the first-ever Vietnamese-American woman appointed to the Los Angeles County Superior Court. She had been based in Alhambra, California.

== Federal judicial service ==
=== District court service ===
On July 31, 2009, President Barack Obama nominated Nguyen to a seat on the United States District Court for the Central District of California, vacated by Judge Nora Margaret Manella, who resigned in 2006 to join the California Courts of Appeal. Senator Dianne Feinstein had recommended Nguyen's nomination. On September 23, 2009, Nguyen appeared before the Senate Judiciary Committee, which reported her nomination on October 15, 2009. On December 1, 2009, the United States Senate confirmed Nguyen by a 97–0 vote. She received her commission on December 4, 2009. On May 15, 2012, her service on the District Court terminated due to her elevation to the court of appeals.

=== Ninth Circuit service ===
On September 22, 2011, President Obama nominated Nguyen to the United States Court of Appeals for the Ninth Circuit. The Senate confirmed Nguyen by a 91–3 vote on May 7, 2012. She received her commission on May 14, 2012. She is the first Asian-American female to serve as a federal appellate judge. She is also the first Vietnamese-American federal judge, and the first Asian-Pacific American female federal judge in California. In 2012, she was speculated to be a candidate for the Supreme Court. In February 2016, The New York Times identified her as a potential nominee to replace Justice Antonin Scalia.

== Notable cases ==
On September 3, 2015, Nguyen granted relief to Edin Avendano-Hernandez, a transgender Mexican, because she showed adequate proof that she would likely face torture if deported back to Mexico. Nguyen was joined by Harry Pregerson and Barrington D. Parker Jr.

On December 29, 2017, Nguyen partially dissented when Stephen Reinhardt and Harry Pregerson blocked an execution due to the mental health of the criminal defendant.

On June 6, 2019, Nguyen ruled against Hyundai and Kia, ruling that they lied about their fuel economy and did not show that the California law would not apply.

On September 23, 2021, Nguyen reversed a ruling by District Judge David O. Carter that would have required Los Angeles to provide housing for the homeless on Skid Row. Nguyen ruled that there was not enough evidence to prove that plaintiffs had suffered racial or other types of discrimination.

On December 22, 2025, Nguyen authored the ruling upholding the convictions of Elizabeth Holmes and Sunny Balwani.

== Personal life ==
Nguyen's husband, Pio S. Kim, was also a federal prosecutor. She has two children.

== See also ==
- Barack Obama Supreme Court candidates
- Joe Biden Supreme Court candidates
- List of Asian American jurists
- List of first women lawyers and judges in California
- List of first women lawyers and judges in the United States

Legal offices
Preceded by Nora Margaret Manella	Judge of the United States District Court for the Central District of California; 2009–2012	Succeeded by Fernando M. Olguin
New seat	Judge of the United States Court of Appeals for the Ninth Circuit; 2012–present	Incumbent
