= Paul John McCormick =

American judge

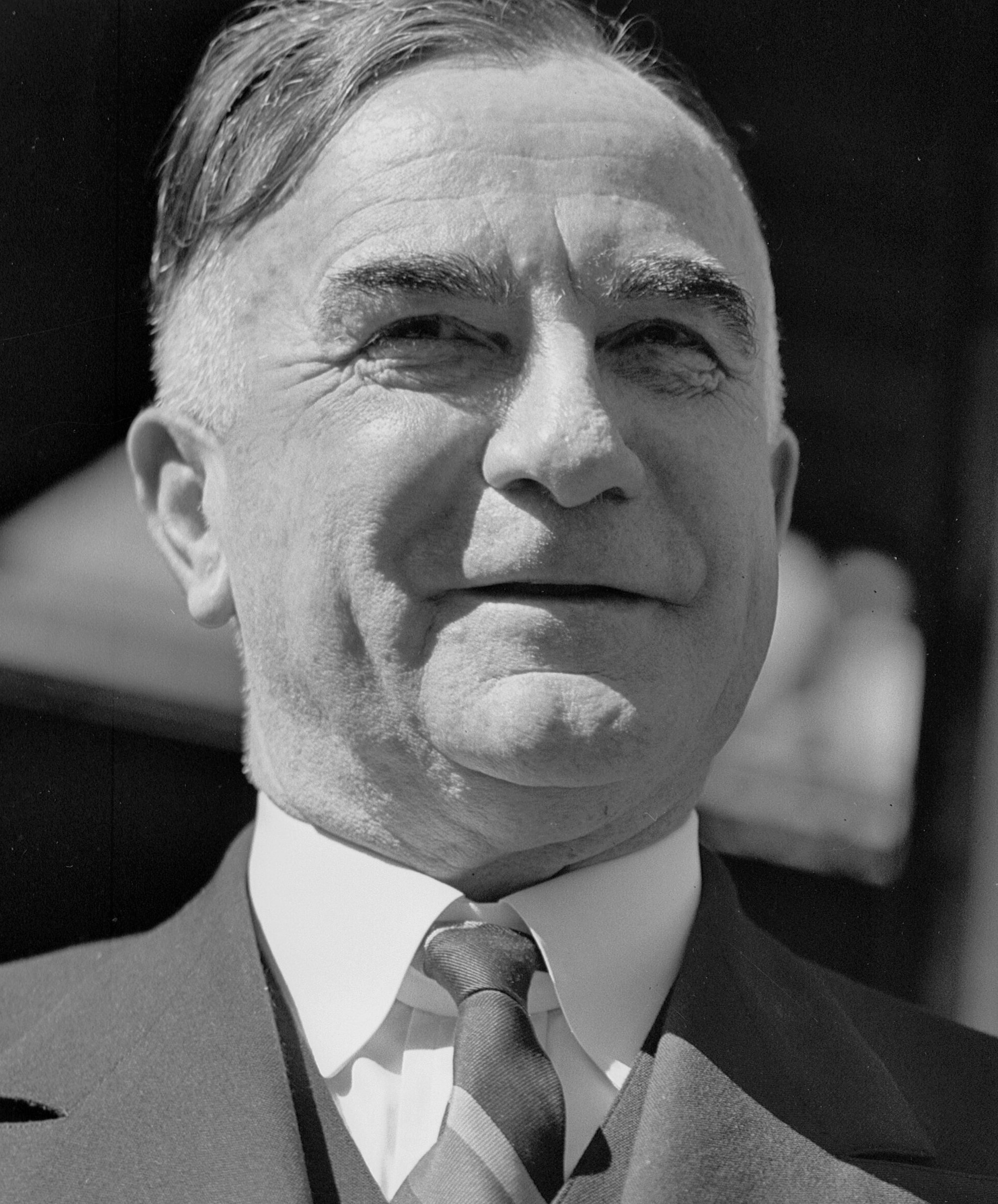
- McCormick in 1936

Senior Judge of the United States District Court for the Southern District of California
- In office September 1, 1951 – December 2, 1960

Chief Judge of the United States District Court for the Southern District of California
- In office 1948–1951
- Preceded by: Office established
- Succeeded by: Leon Rene Yankwich

Judge of the United States District Court for the Southern District of California
- In office February 11, 1924 – September 1, 1951
- Appointed by: Calvin Coolidge
- Preceded by: Oscar A. Trippet
- Succeeded by: Ernest Allen Tolin

Personal details
- Born: Paul John McCormick; April 23, 1879 New York City, New York, U.S.
- Died: December 2, 1960 (aged 81)
- Education: St. Ignatius College read law

Paul John McCormick (April 23, 1879 – December 2, 1960) was a United States district judge of the United States District Court for the Southern District of California.

== Education and career ==
Born in New York City, New York, McCormick attended St. Ignatius College (now the University of San Francisco) and read law to enter the bar in 1900. He was in private practice in Los Angeles, California from 1900 to 1905. He was an assistant district attorney of Los Angeles County, California from 1905 to 1910, thereafter serving as a Judge of the Los Angeles County Superior Court until 1921, and as an Associate Justice of the District Court of Appeal of California from 1921 to 1924.

== Federal judicial service ==
On February 7, 1924, McCormick was nominated by President Calvin Coolidge to a seat on the United States District Court for the Southern District of California vacated by Judge Oscar A. Trippet. McCormick was confirmed by the United States Senate on February 11, 1924, and received his commission the same day. He served as Chief Judge from 1948 to 1951. He assumed senior status on September 1, 1951, serving in that capacity until his death on December 2, 1960.

== Wickersham Commission ==
In 1929, President Herbert Hoover appointed McCormick as one of the eleven primary members of the Wickersham Commission on issues relating to law enforcement, criminal activity, police brutality, and Prohibition.

== See also ==
- James Stuart McKnight, Los Angeles City Council member sentenced by McCormick

== Sources ==
- Paul John McCormick at Courtlistener.com
- A short bio of Paul John McCormick at openjurist.org

Legal offices
Preceded by Oscar A. Trippet	Judge of the United States District Court for the Southern District of California; 1924–1951	Succeeded by Ernest Allen Tolin
Preceded by Office established	Chief Judge of the United States District Court for the Southern District of California; 1948–1951	Succeeded by Leon Rene Yankwich
