= Cain v. Universal Pictures Co. =

Copyright legal case

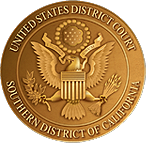
- Court: United States District Court for the Southern District of California
- Full case name: CAIN v. UNIVERSAL PICTURES CO., Inc., et al.
- Decided: December 14, 1942
- Citation: 47 F.Supp. 1013 (1942)

Court membership
- Judge sitting: Leon Yankwich

Keywords
- copyright infringement

Cain v. Universal Pictures Co. (1942) was the first case in the United States to define the doctrine of "scènes à faire" as it applies to copyright law. Judge Leon Rene Yankwich introduced the term.

== Background ==
The successful crime fiction writer James M. Cain, best known for his The Postman Always Rings Twice (1934), wrote the novel Serenade in 1937. It includes a torrid episode in a church where the main character, a singer, has taken refuge from a storm with a Mexican girl. In 1938 Cain sold a different story called Modern Cinderella to Universal Pictures. The studio began production in 1939, then found that they needed to adapt the plot to include a scene with the two stars, Irene Dunne and Charles Boyer. Several writers worked on alternative scenes under tight deadlines, and one in which the two characters take refuge from a storm in a church was adopted. After the film was released as When Tomorrow Comes, James M. Cain sued Universal Pictures, the scriptwriter and the movie director for copyright violation.

== Decision ==
The scriptwriter admitted that he had read Serenade when it was published in 1937, but said that he had not copied the church scene in book when writing the movie scene. The judge found that this admission of access was relevant, since inadvertent copying could have taken place, but that copyright violation also depended on there being enough similarity between the scenes in the book and the movie that a layman would recognize that there had been copying. In this, he found that the chaste scene in the movie bore no resemblance to the book and there was no infringement.

The judge observed that the concept of a couple taking refuge from a storm in a church was commonplace, dating to the first churches, and could not be subject to copyright. He noted that there were some similarities between the book and movie versions, such as playing the church piano, praying and suffering from hunger. He introduced the French term "scènes à faire" for these similarities, saying "it was inevitable that incidents like these and others which are, necessarily, associated with such a situation should force themselves upon the writer in developing the theme." He found against the plaintiff, but awarded no costs to the defendants.

== Results ==
The concept now known as "scènes à faire" has been used by both U.S. and U.K. courts. The term is used both in the sense of a scene that follows inevitably from a situation, or a standard scene that is always included in a particular genre of work. Another court said "Under the ... doctrine of scènes à faire, courts will not protect a copyrighted work from infringement if the expression embodied in the work necessarily flows from a commonplace idea." The concept has been extended to computer software, where some aspects may be dictated by the problem to be solved or by standards that must be met, or may be common programming techniques.
