= Nora Margaret Manella =

American judge from California

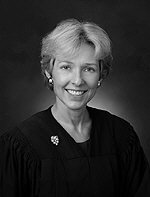

Judge of the United States District Court for the Central District of California
- In office October 22, 1998 – May 21, 2006
- Appointed by: Bill Clinton
- Preceded by: Mariana Pfaelzer
- Succeeded by: Jacqueline Nguyen

United States Attorney for the Central District of California
- In office January 3, 1994 – December 20, 1998
- President: Bill Clinton
- Preceded by: Lourdes Baird
- Succeeded by: Alejandro Mayorkas

Personal details
- Born: January 22, 1951 (age 75) Los Angeles, California, U.S.
- Education: Wellesley College (BA); University of Southern California Law School (JD)

Nora Margaret Manella (born January 22, 1951) was the Presiding Justice of the California Second District Court of Appeal, Division Four and a former United States district judge of the United States District Court for the Central District of California.

== Education and career ==
Born in Los Angeles, California, Manella received a Bachelor of Arts degree from Wellesley College in 1972 and a Juris Doctor from the University of Southern California Law School in 1975. She was a law clerk for Judge John Minor Wisdom of the United States Court of Appeals for the Fifth Circuit from 1975 to 1976. She was legal counsel to the Subcommittee on the Constitution, United States Senate Judiciary Committee from 1976 to 1978. She was in private practice in California from 1978 to 1982. She was an Assistant United States Attorney of the Central District of California from 1982 to 1990. She was a judge on the Los Angeles Municipal Court from 1990 to 1992, and on the Los Angeles Superior Court from 1992 to 1994. She was a Justice Pro Tem, California Court of Appeal in 1992. She was the United States Attorney for the Central District of California from 1994 to 1998.

== Federal judicial service ==
Manella first expressed an interest in serving as a judge on the United States Court of Appeals for the Ninth Circuit in 1995, when she wrote a June 7, 1995 letter to senior presidential advisor George Stephanopoulos expressing her interest in such a seat.

Manella never was nominated to the Ninth Circuit. Instead, on March 31, 1998, President Bill Clinton nominated Manella to be a United States District Judge of the United States District Court for the Central District of California that had been vacated by Mariana Pfaelzer. She was confirmed by the United States Senate on October 21, 1998, and received her judicial commission on October 22, 1998. Manella served in that capacity until May 21, 2006, when she resigned to join the California Court of Appeal, where she served in the 2nd District until her retirement on January 31, 2023.

== State judicial service ==
While sitting on the California Court of Appeal, Manella wrote for a unanimous panel that affirmed the 2012 conviction of Los Angeles police officer Stephanie Lazarus for the murder of a former boyfriend's wife.

== Personal life ==
Manella's father, Arthur Manella, was a tax lawyer and a founding partner of Irell & Manella.

Legal offices
| Preceded by Lourdes Baird | United States Attorney for the Central District of California; 1994–1998 | Succeeded by Alejandro Mayorkas |
| Preceded by Mariana Pfaelzer | Judge of the United States District Court for the Central District of California; 1998–2006 | Succeeded by Jacqueline Nguyen |
