= When Tomorrow Comes (film) =

1939 romantic drama film by John M. Stahl

- Directed by: John M. Stahl
- Screenplay by: Dwight Taylor
- Story by: "A Modern Cinderella" by James M. Cain
- Produced by: John M. Stahl
- Starring: Irene Dunne; Charles Boyer
- Cinematography: John J. Mescall
- Edited by: Milton Carruth
- Production company: Universal Pictures
- Distributed by: Universal Pictures
- Release date: August 11, 1939 (United States)
- Running time: 90 minutes
- Country: United States
- Language: English
- Budget: $1 million

When Tomorrow Comes is a 1939 American romantic melodrama film directed by John M. Stahl, and starring Irene Dunne and Charles Boyer. The screenplay concerns a waitress who falls in love with a man who later turns out to be a married concert pianist. Bernard B. Brown won the Academy Award for Best Sound.

A scene in the film where the two protagonists take refuge from a storm in a church was the subject of Cain v. Universal Pictures, a case in which the writer James M. Cain sued Universal Pictures, the scriptwriter and the director for copyright infringement. Judge Leon Rene Yankwich ruled that there was no resemblance between the scenes in the book and the film other than incidental "scènes à faire", or natural similarities due to the situation, establishing an important legal precedent.

== Plot ==
Philip Andre Chagal is a famous concert pianist who visits a restaurant where struggling waitress Helen works. Philip is immediately attracted to her and joins her at a union rally, and discovers Helen's left-wing political opinions when she suggests every union member goes on strike. After the meeting, Philip praises her speech and leadership skills, despite being anti-union himself, and they fall in love.

On a date in Long Island, the couple relax on Philip's boat when the weather turns violent. They disembark and take cover in Philip's summer home, but the storm becomes a hurricane. Helen and Philip kiss, and try to leave for the nearest town, eventually staying overnight in a church. Helen later discovers Philip is married and secretly leaves for the mainland. Philip tries to apologize and make Helen reconsider by introducing her to his wife Madeline. Helen hesitates, and Madeline pulls her aside, revealing she is heartbroken and guilty about a stillbirth she and Philip are still mourning five years later. Despite still being in love with the pianist, Helen ends the relationship.

== Cast ==
- Irene Dunne as Helen Lawrence
- Charles Boyer as Philip Chagal
- Barbara O'Neil as Madeleine Chagal
- Onslow Stevens as Jim Holden
- Nydia Westman as Lulu
- Nella Walker as Betty Dumont
- Fritz Feld as Nicholas

Uncredited roles include Frances Robinson, Helen Lynd, Kitty McHugh, Florence Lake, Dorothy Granger, Mary Treen, Harry C. Bradley, Milton Parsons, Addison Richards, George Humbert, Milburn Stone, Frank Darien, Gaylord Pendleton, Mickey Kuhn, and Ed Peil.

== Development ==
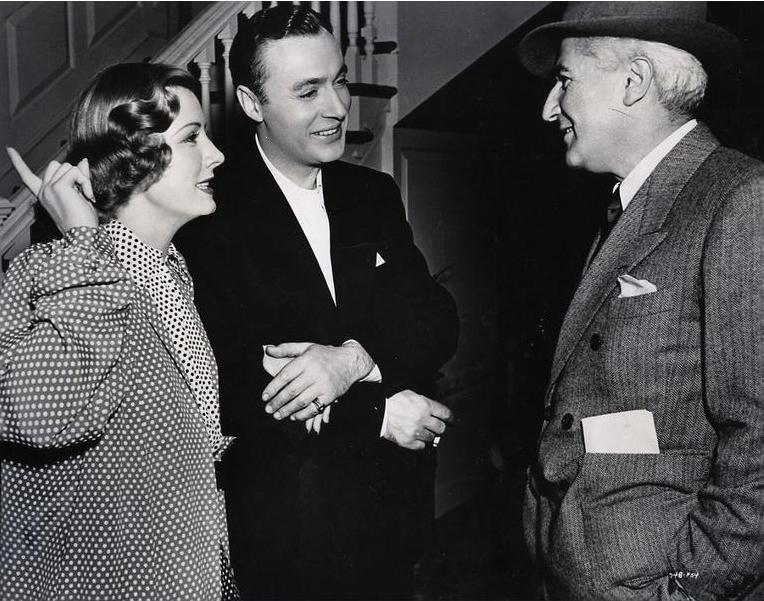
Dunne, Boyer and Stahl between filming.

Charles Boyer and Irene Dunne had previously starred together in Love Affair, Leo McCarey's romantic dramedy distributed by RKO Pictures. It was a surprise hit, despite its troubled production, and viewers enjoyed watching Dunne and Boyer's characters fall in love. Hollywood was excited about the newest popular team-up, but Boyer was just announced to star in All This, and Heaven Too and was supposedly prepping for Intermezzo. (Note: Boyer would not star or appear in Intermezzo, but All This, and Heaven Too would not be released until July the following year.) Dunne was waiting for Universal Pictures to find a new project for her because she "owed" them a movie, and might have been the cause of Boyer abandoning his new films just as Universal revealed they were developing a new film that might be a contender for everyone's new favorite couple. Dwight Taylor wrote an adaptation of A Modern Cinderella, an unpublished story James M. Cain had sold to Universal in November the year before, but had rewritten the story in a style that could fit the Dunne-Boyer mold. Boyer noticed his character shared allusions to Love Affair's Michel Marnet and only accepted the role if he would receive the same pay (estimated $100,000) for his appearance.

Filming took place in spring and was more relaxed than the Love Affair set, but Stahl was said to have lost 19 pounds (1.4 st) from the stress of retakes.

After the movie's release, Photoplay magazine's October issue featured two essays written by Boyer and Dunne about each other, in the style of a parlor game where a player who briefly left the room guesses the secret noun other contestants chose by asking questions like "If I were that person, what kind of car would I be?" The editor explained: "Surely, working together as they do and have done, and being analytical, intelligent people, each would give a clear-limned portrait of the other; unbiased, colorful, exciting." Boyer's essay, "Irene: As Seen By Charles Boyer", described Dunne in prose, while Dunne's essay, "Charles: As Seen By Irene Dunne", described Boyer under topical subtitles, but Wes D. Gehring pointed out both essays' frequent references to fine art, as well as Dunne personifying Boyer through French impressionism.

== Controversy ==
After the film's release, James M. Cain sued Universal Pictures, Taylor and Stahl for copyright infringement, arguing Taylor's deviation from A Modern Cinderella had sneaked in the church scene from his 1937 story Serenade, a story previously called "unfilmable". Taylor admitted he read Serenade during the time of its release but denied theft, whereas Stahl denied knowing of the story's existence. Cain lost the case in December 14, and Judge Leon Yankwich ruled there was no resemblance between the book's scenes and those in the film. Cain v. Universal Pictures Co. is noted as the first case in American law to use the scènes à faire doctrine.

== Reception ==
The movie was Universal's most successful film of 1939. Audiences appreciated seeing another film with the Boyer and Dunne pairing so soon after the first, but critical reaction was mixed to negative, seemingly not blaming the actors for their disdain. Frank S. Nugent wrote, "Boyer, with the charm that has made him one of our few authentic Matinée idols, and Miss Dunne, always a pleasant and sincere performer, are unequal to the task of bringing life and conviction to James Cain's made-to-order script." Philip Hartung called the ending "silly", but praised Barbara O'Neill for "doing an excellent piece of acting as the deranged wife." Franz Hoellering wrote, "It is a confused Charles Boyer-Irene Dunne vehicle which makes one wish to see Boyer again in an important picture and Irene Dunne as the brilliant comedienne she is." Time magazine bluntly wrote: "Cinemaddicts [sic] will not find it notable for novelty."

Some critical reception showed optimism. "It carries a hefty appeal to women [but] also provides strong entertainment for general audiences," Variety wrote, "Miss Dunne and Boyer are ideally teamed to provide a sincere and understanding romance, despite the obstacles presented for a happy conclusion." Daily Variety wrote, "It is the kind of love story, deep and rich and passionate, which John M. Stahl does better than any other producer-director in the business." The Hollywood Reporter said, "It is a thoughtful, painstaking film in its execution and will undoubtedly make its appeal to feminine sentimentality. But the opposite sex, too, will react to the gentle tug of its poignancy." Digest attempted—"Give John Stahl a triangle to play with, give him Irene Dunne and Charles Boyer for the sympathetic points of that triangle, and the result should spell money"—but then added: "It's just too bad that the writer, or writers, couldn't make up their minds what story they were telling."

Expected comparisons to Love Affair also followed. The Kansas City Times wrote, "[When Tomorrow Comes] does not have as much comedy in it as when Miss Dunne and Mr. Boyer presented last season when they co-starred in Love Affair." "There is something missing in When Tomorrow Comes[;] There isn't the sparkling wit of Love Affair," said The Brooklyn Daily Eagle. "It is the usual Hollywood Cinderella touch. And Charles Boyer and Irene Dunne, the leads, don't seem to miss it at all. [I]ndeed, [Stahl] has woven together the elements for a romance that is as near to actuality and as far from affection as that of the Love Affair starring effort of Boyer and Miss Dunne."

== Legacy ==
Although not an official remake, 1957's Interlude, directed by Douglas Sirk, was also based on Cain's story. (Note: Sirk cited Serenade as the title of his inspiration, but critic Tom Ryan argued both movies were actually based on Cain's The Root of His Evil.) It starred June Allyson and Rossano Brazzi.

== Bibliography ==
- Gehring, Wes D. (2006). Irene Dunne: First Lady of Hollywood. Scarecrow Press. ISBN 978-0810858640.
- Swindell, Larry (1983). Charles Boyer: The Reluctant Lover. Doubleday. ISBN 0385170521.
