= Fernando M. Olguin =

American judge (born 1961)

Judge of the United States District Court for the Central District of California
- Incumbent
- Assumed office January 16, 2013
- Appointed by: Barack Obama
- Preceded by: Jacqueline Nguyen

Magistrate Judge of the United States District Court for the Central District of California
- In office 2001–2012

Personal details
- Born: 1961 (age 64–65) Los Angeles, California, U.S.
- Education: Harvard University (BA); University of California, Berkeley (MA, JD)

Fernando Manzano Olguin (born 1961) is a United States district judge of the United States District Court for the Central District of California.

== Early life and education ==
Olguin was born in 1961, in Los Angeles. He earned a Bachelor of Arts degree in 1985 from Harvard University. In 1989, he earned a Master of Arts degree from the University of California, Berkeley and a Juris Doctor from UC Berkeley School of Law. After law school, Olguin served as a law clerk to Judge Charles Andrew Muecke of the United States District Court for the District of Arizona.

== Career ==
From 1991 to 1994, Olguin was a trial attorney in the United States Department of Justice. He then worked as the education program director at the Mexican American Legal Defense and Educational Fund from 1994 to 1995. From 1995 to 2001, Olguin worked as a partner at the law firm Traber, Voorhees & Olguin handling housing and employment matters.

=== Federal judicial service ===
From 2001 to 2012, Olguin served as a United States magistrate judge for the Central District of California.

On May 14, 2012, President Barack Obama nominated Olguin to serve as a United States District Judge for the Central District to fill the seat vacated by Judge Jacqueline Nguyen, who was elevated to the United States Court of Appeals for the Ninth Circuit. Olguin's nomination was reported by the United States Senate Committee on the Judiciary to the full Senate on July 19, 2012. On December 17, 2012, the Senate confirmed Olguin in a voice vote. He received his commission on January 16, 2013.

=== Notable ruling ===
In January 2022, Olguin granted a motion to dismiss a lawsuit filed by Spencer Elden against members of Nirvana when they used an image of him as a baby swimming naked underwater.

== See also ==
- List of Hispanic and Latino American jurists

Legal offices
Preceded by Jacqueline Nguyen	Judge of the United States District Court for the Central District of California; 2013–present	Incumbent
