= Mariana Pfaelzer =

American judge

Mariana R. Pfaelzer
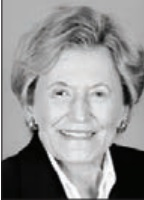

Senior Judge of the United States District Court for the Central District of California
- In office December 31, 1997 – May 14, 2015

Judge of the United States District Court for the Central District of California
- In office September 23, 1978 – December 31, 1997
- Appointed by: Jimmy Carter
- Preceded by: Francis C. Whelan
- Succeeded by: Nora Margaret Manella

Personal details
- Born: February 4, 1926 Los Angeles, California, U.S.
- Died: May 14, 2015 (aged 89) Los Angeles, California, U.S.
- Education: University of California, Santa Barbara (AB); University of California, Los Angeles (JD)

Mariana R. Pfaelzer (February 4, 1926 – May 14, 2015) was a United States district judge of the United States District Court for the Central District of California.

== Education and career ==
Born in Los Angeles, California in 1926, Pfaelzer received an Artium Baccalaureus degree from the University of California, Santa Barbara in 1949 and a Juris Doctor from the UCLA School of Law in 1957. She was in private practice in Los Angeles from 1957 to 1978.

== Federal judicial service ==
On August 8, 1978, Pfaelzer was nominated by President Jimmy Carter to a seat on the United States District Court for the Central District of California vacated by Judge Francis C. Whelan. She was confirmed by the United States Senate on September 22, 1978, and received her commission the next day. She was the first female federal judge appointed to the district. She assumed senior status on December 31, 1997, serving in that status until her death.

== Notable cases ==
She is noted for her role in striking down California's Proposition 187, which would have denied services to illegal immigrants in California. Pfaelzer handed down a $600 million judgment against Countrywide Financial.

During the 1980s and 90's, she had overseen cases against phreaker and hacker Kevin Mitnick. During his first trial as a youth, she had Mitnick sent to solitary confinement because the prosecutor convinced her he could "Call NORAD, whistle into the phone and launch missiles."

== Death and tributes ==
On May 14, 2015, Pfaelzer died in Los Angeles after serving on the federal bench for nearly 40 years. George H. King, the Chief District Court Judge for the Central District of California, noted that she "was the epitome of what a federal judge ought to be . . . presi[ding] with brilliance, analytical rigor, practicality, wisdom, grace and courage."

== Personal ==
Pfaelzer was married to Frank Rothman, an attorney who died in 2000.

== See also ==
- List of first women lawyers and judges in California

== Sources ==
Legal offices
Preceded by Francis C. Whelan	Judge of the United States District Court for the Central District of California; 1978–1997	Succeeded by Nora Margaret Manella
