= Leon Rene Yankwich =

American judge

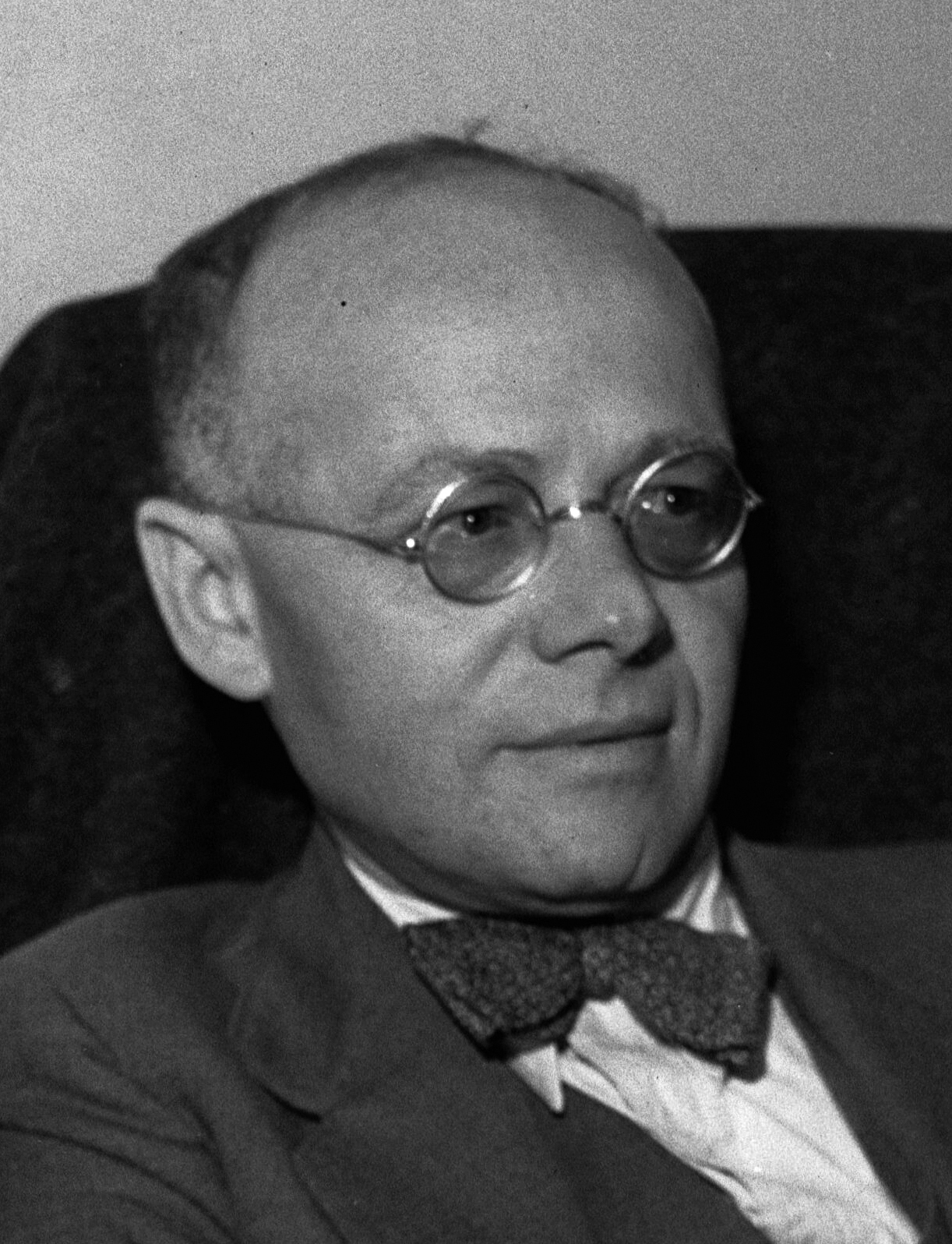
- Yankwich in 1938

Senior Judge of the United States District Court for the Central District of California
- In office September 18, 1966 – February 9, 1975

Senior Judge of the United States District Court for the Southern District of California
- In office April 28, 1964 – September 18, 1966

Chief Judge of the United States District Court for the Southern District of California
- In office 1951–1959
- Preceded by: Paul John McCormick
- Succeeded by: Benjamin Harrison

Judge of the United States District Court for the Southern District of California
- In office August 24, 1935 – April 28, 1964
- Appointed by: Franklin D. Roosevelt
- Preceded by: Seat established by 49 Stat. 508
- Succeeded by: Francis C. Whelan

Personal details
- Born: Leon Rene Yankwich; September 25, 1888 Iași, Romania
- Died: February 9, 1975 (aged 86)
- Education: Willamette University College of Law (LL.B.); Loyola Law School (J.D.)

Leon Rene Yankwich (September 25, 1888 – February 9, 1975) was a United States district judge of the United States District Court for the Southern District of California.

== Education and career ==
Born in Iași, Romania, Yankwich received a Bachelor of Laws from Willamette University College of Law in 1909. He was in private practice in Modesto, California from 1909 to 1916, and in Los Angeles, California from 1916 to 1927, interrupted by service as a Sergeant in the United States Army during World War I in 1918. He received a Juris Doctor from Loyola Law School in Los Angeles in 1926. He was a Judge of the Superior Court of Los Angeles County from 1927 to 1935.

== Federal judicial service ==
Yankwich was nominated by President Franklin D. Roosevelt on August 21, 1935, to the United States District Court for the Southern District of California, to a new seat authorized by 49 Stat. 508. He was confirmed by the United States Senate on August 23, 1935, and received his commission on August 24, 1935. He served as Chief Judge from 1951 to 1959. He assumed senior status on April 28, 1964. Yankwich was reassigned by operation of law to the United States District Court for the Central District of California on September 18, 1966, pursuant to 80 Stat. 75. His service terminated on February 9, 1975, due to his death.

=== Notable cases ===
Yankwich tried Cain v. Universal Pictures (1942), a case in which the writer James M. Cain sued Universal Pictures, the scriptwriter and the director for copyright infringement in connection with the film When Tomorrow Comes. Cain claimed a scene in his book where two protagonists take refuge from a storm in a church had been copied in a scene depicting the same situation in the movie. Yankwich ruled that there was no resemblance between the scenes in the book and the film other than incidental scènes à faire, or natural similarities due to the situation, establishing an important legal precedent.

Yankwich decided several important cases involving racial minorities. He invalidated segregation in Lopez v. Seccombe (1944), a decision prohibiting discrimination against persons of Mexican ancestry in San Bernardino's public recreational facilities. In Uyeno v. Acheson (1951), he held that a birthright citizen had not been expatriated by voting in an election in Occupied Japan in 1947: "In the present case, the testimony of the plaintiff is that the constant reiteration through newspapers and over the radio, and by friends and advisers of the importance of voting and the need for voting was taken by him as 'a command' on the part of General MacArthur and the Occupation Forces to vote, which he could not, with impunity, disobey. Indeed, he testified that, in addition to this, he was led to believe that if he did not vote, he would lose his food ration card."

== Sources ==
Legal offices
Preceded by Seat established by 49 Stat. 508	Judge of the United States District Court for the Southern District of California; 1935–1964	Succeeded by Francis C. Whelan
Preceded by Paul John McCormick	Chief Judge of the United States District Court for the Southern District of California; 1951–1959	Succeeded by Benjamin Harrison
