= Murder of Sherri Rasmussen =

1986 murder in Los Angeles

- Rasmussen shortly before her 1985 wedding
- Date: February 24, 1986
- Location: Los Angeles, California, U.S.; 34°11′58″N 118°30′1″W
- Convicted: Stephanie Lazarus
- Charges: First-degree murder
- Verdict: Guilty
- Sentence: 27 years to life in prison
- Litigation: Rasmussen v. City of Los Angeles, Rasmussen v. Lazarus, Francis v. City of Los Angeles

On February 24, 1986, the body of Sherri Rasmussen (born February 7, 1957) was found in the condominium she shared with her husband, John Ruetten, in the Van Nuys neighborhood of Los Angeles, California, United States. She had been beaten and shot three times. The Los Angeles Police Department (LAPD) initially considered the case a botched burglary and were unable to identify a suspect. Rasmussen's father believed that LAPD officer Stephanie Lazarus, formerly in a relationship with Ruetten, was a prime suspect due to her continued attraction to Ruetten and confrontations with Rasmussen. The investigation stalled after several months; the case went cold for over two decades afterwards.

Detectives who re-examined the files in 2008 focused on Lazarus, by then a detective. A covertly taken DNA sample matched one from a bite on Rasmussen's body. Lazarus was convicted of first-degree murder in 2012 and is serving a sentence of 27 years to life. On appeal, Lazarus argued that the age of the case and the evidence denied her due process, that the search warrant was improperly granted, her statements in an interview prior to her arrest were compelled, and that evidence supporting the original case theory should have been admitted. The conviction was upheld in 2015; California's Supreme Court declined to hear any further appeal. During a 2023 parole hearing, Lazarus confessed to the crime. The panel hearing her request initially granted it but it was rescinded by the full board in late 2024.

Some of the police files suggest that evidence which could have implicated Lazarus earlier in the investigation was later removed or tampered with. Lazarus herself plausibly had access to these files during the 1990s; other LAPD officers may have been involved. Rasmussen's parents unsuccessfully sued the department over this and other aspects of the investigation. The criminalist who found key DNA evidence from the bite mark lost a suit claiming she had been pressured by police to favor certain suspects in this and other high-profile cases and faced retaliation for bringing this to the department's attention.

== Background ==
While an undergraduate at the University of California, Los Angeles (UCLA) from 1978 to 1982, John Ruetten, a mechanical engineering major from San Diego, occasionally dated Stephanie Lazarus, a fellow Dykstra Hall resident from Simi Valley majoring in political science and sociology. Their friends said she seemed to take the relationship more seriously than he did. Both were avid athletes; Lazarus played on UCLA's junior varsity women's basketball team. She stole Ruetten's clothes when he showered and photographed him in his underwear while he slept. Ruetten never considered the relationship anything more than "necking and fooling around". They had sex for the first time after he graduated. After that they saw each other two or three times a month, occasionally taking trips together. Some of those encounters resulted in sex.

Following his 1981 graduation Ruetten accepted a job with Dataproducts, a maker of computer peripherals. After graduating, a year later, Lazarus considered law school. She decided on law enforcement instead and was admitted to the city's police academy. At that time, the Los Angeles Police Department (LAPD) was trying to increase the number of women on the force in response to a consent decree following a sex-discrimination lawsuit brought by former female officers. After completing a special eight-week pre-academy training program, she graduated and became a uniformed officer in 1983. Classmates recalled that she was particularly tenacious during physical combat training, especially in exercises where trainees had to retain control of a weapon. During her training, Lazarus described Ruetten as her college boyfriend, and she was his date at Dataproducts' 1983 Christmas party, where they had a photo taken together. He later testified that they had sex "20 to 30 times" between 1981 and 1984, but that he never considered her his girlfriend. Upon graduation Lazarus settled in a Granada Hills condo and purchased a Smith & Wesson Model 49 .38-caliber revolver through the department as her backup firearm.

Ruetten later met Sherri Rasmussen, a graduate of Loma Linda University who was on a fast career track in critical care nursing. Born in Walla Walla, Washington and raised in Arizona, Rasmussen began college at La Sierra University at 16 after graduating from Thunderbird Adventist Academy. After her freshman year she was accepted at Loma Linda's nursing program and transferred there. Upon graduating, she worked at UCLA Medical Center's coronary care unit and studied for the master's in nursing UCLA awarded her in 1980. Afterwards, her father, Nels Rasmussen, bought Sherri a condo in Van Nuys with a drive-in garage so she would not have to walk along the street after returning from work late at night. She paid him rent equal to his monthly mortgage payment.

After earning her degree, Rasmussen was promoted to head nurse of UCLA's coronary care and observation unit. She also was appointed an unpaid assistant clinical professor of nursing, giving lectures to students. By her late 20s Rasmussen was the director of nursing at Glendale Adventist Medical Center. She also gave presentations and taught classes for fellow nurses. At a June 1984 party Sherri met Ruetten; they began dating shortly afterwards.

For her first assignment as a uniformed LAPD officer, Lazarus drew the Hollywood division, an area notorious at the time for high levels of street crime. Morale among the predominantly male officers was poor in the wake of the "Hollywood Burglars" scandal in which 14 officers were ultimately fired after two were prosecuted for burglarizing video stores while on duty. Chief Daryl Gates closely oversaw the internal affairs investigation. He observed later that Hollywood seemed to have higher rates of police misconduct than other divisions. "There is something about the place," he wrote, "an almost carnival atmosphere that suggests 'here, anything goes'".

A female colleague of Lazarus's at Hollywood, one of the few other women in the division and a teammate on the department's women's basketball team, recalls her as being an asset to the team primarily through her tight and physical defensive play and willingness to work with others. (Note: That officer observed that women who were successful LAPD officers in that era, like Lazarus, primarily had significant experience playing organized team sports, since they were not intimidated by the physical fitness requirements and understood the value of teamwork.) Teamwork at Hollywood went further than the requirements of the job. Officers upheld the blue wall of silence in the face of misconduct investigations, regularly telling each other to "Admit nothing. Deny everything. Demand proof." A diary Lazarus started while working at Hollywood documents her acculturation to the department, showing her increasingly identifying with the LAPD above all, accepted by fellow officers for her efforts to fit in and maintaining a detached, often nonchalant, attitude when responding to sometimes brutal crimes and their traumatized victims.

Lazarus told the friend that her training officer, James Tomer, regularly sexually propositioned her; her repeated refusals led to workplace rumors that she was a lesbian. Later, Tomer faced departmental charges of narcotics theft. Lazarus was called to testify at his disciplinary hearing; Tomer was acquitted and later won a verdict against the department over the charges in federal court, arguing he had been framed, the first time the department had been successfully sued over an internal affairs investigation (the verdict was later overturned on appeal). After a year on probation, she was promoted and transferred to the quieter (Note: In her diary, Lazarus called working at the Devonshire desk "kinda fun" because traffic on the phone and in person was slower than in Hollywood, therefore it was possible to help them instead of just transferring them to someone else.) Devonshire division, covering Northridge, Chatsworth and Granada Hills, in March 1985. She rented the spare bedroom in her condo to a fellow officer.

=== Ruetten–Rasmussen relationship and effect on Lazarus ===
Lazarus had thrown Ruetten a surprise party on his 25th birthday, unaware that he had been dating other women or that he had developed a serious relationship with Rasmussen. In a May 1985 diary entry, she mentions visiting Ruetten and his girlfriend, the first time she met Rasmussen. The following month Lazarus was depressed after learning that Ruetten and Rasmussen had become engaged a week earlier. In her diary, she wrote, "I really don't feel like working. I found out that John is getting married ... My concentration is like -10". Later that night, she awoke her roommate, a fellow officer, to commiserate. He recalled later that he had never seen her cry until then. Lazarus visited Ruetten at his condo later that month, shortly before he moved in with his fiancée. The two had sex—"to give her closure", Ruetten testified years later—for the last time before Rasmussen's death. He did not tell Rasmussen about the encounter. Lazarus was still not over Ruetten. In August she wrote to her mother: "I'm truly in love with John and the past year has really torn me up ... I wish it didn't end the way it did, and I don't think I'll ever understand his decision." An LAPD women's basketball teammate at the California Police Olympics around that time recalls Lazarus mentioning a boyfriend from UCLA named John.

Sometime in July or August, on a day off, Lazarus visited Rasmussen at work, wearing tight short shorts and a tank top. Lazarus told her that she and John were still having sex and that when their marriage failed, "I'll be there to pick up the pieces". Rasmussen responded that "your services won't be needed." Lazarus left saying "If I can't have John, no one else will. Including you." While Rasmussen did not report the incident to hospital security, she complained to her father about it and confronted Ruetten when he returned from work that evening. He admitted the infidelity and asked Sherri to forgive him, but did not contact Lazarus or take any action to prevent further contact as from his perspective any relationship with her was long over. (Note: While Rasmussen did not, as far as anyone recalls, threaten to break the couple's engagement, a friend does recall her implying that she was reconsidering the relationship later that summer.)

Ruetten and Rasmussen married in November as planned. Her concerns about Lazarus lingered. Since Ruetten had moved in with her they had been receiving occasional hang-up calls. (Note: At her 2023 parole hearing, Lazarus admitting to making them.) Before leaving on their honeymoon near the end of the year, the couple installed a burglar alarm in their condo. Sherri set the alarm code as 1123, their wedding anniversary, which a friend advised her was a poor choice. Ruetten left Dataproducts for Micropolis, a hard drive manufacturer in Chatsworth.

In late 1985, Lazarus seemed to her friends and coworkers to be moving on from Ruetten. She began working part-time security at Los Angeles Pierce College in Woodland Hills and dated again. Near the end of the year she drafted a personal ad in her diary. But in January, Lazarus brought her skis to the condo and asked Ruetten to wax them. Despite Rasmussen's objections, he complied. Rasmussen felt that the visit and request was strange, especially since Lazarus was dressed in flattering workout clothes. After Lazarus left, Rasmussen asked her husband if their relationship was truly over. Ruetten convinced her the two were just friends. After failing to persuade her husband to not wax the skis and just return them, Rasmussen told him not to drop them off at Lazarus's apartment. A few days later, after Ruetten had left for work, Lazarus returned to pick up the waxed skis, in uniform and armed.

On another occasion later that month, Rasmussen again confronted Lazarus when, after Ruetten had gone to work one morning, Rasmussen found her in the couple's living room, in uniform. Lazarus left after being firmly asked. Rasmussen told her father about the incident but not Ruetten, and did not believe reporting it to the police would be effective. On a visit with her parents in Tucson in early February, Nels Rasmussen tried to persuade John to move there, assuring his son-in-law he could get him an engineering position through connections. Sherri again confided in her father, after they returned to Los Angeles, telling him she feared that Lazarus was stalking her on the street, sometimes posing as a young man.

On February 14, 1986, Lazarus's roommate moved out. A week later, on February 23, one of Ruetten's friends from UCLA visited the couple's condo. Unlike their usual habit of entering through the garage, the front door was used during the visit, and Ruetten inadvertently left it unlocked afterward.

== Crime ==
On the morning of February 24, 1986, Ruetten left the couple's condominium on Balboa Boulevard at approximately 7:20 a.m. for work. Rasmussen had been scheduled to deliver a motivational presentation at Glendale Adventist Medical Center, a workplace initiative she reportedly viewed as ineffective. She told Ruetten that she might call in sick instead, citing a back injury she sustained during an aerobics class the previous day. After making a few stops, Ruetten arrived at Micropolis about 30 minutes later.

At 9:45, a neighbor noticed that the Ruettens' garage door was open, with no car visible. Approximately 15 minutes later, Ruetten made the first of several unanswered calls home over the course of the day. He found it strange that the answering machine did not respond, since both of them turned it on when leaving the condo unoccupied. Rasmussen's sister, a nurse at another local hospital, also called, getting no answer. At noon, two men, who the neighbor believed were gardeners in the compound, gave her and her husband a purse they had found, which turned out to be Rasmussen's. A maid cleaning a nearby unit said she heard something that sounded like two people fighting, and then something falling, at around 12:30 p.m.

When Ruetten returned home in the evening, he found broken glass on the driveway. Rasmussen's BMW 318i was missing. Ruetten later told investigators it was unusual for her to have left the condo without telling him, given her plans to stay home that morning. Inside, Ruetten found Rasmussen dead on the living room floor, shot three times. There were signs of a struggle, such as a broken porcelain vase, a bloody handprint next to the burglar alarm's panic button, and a toppled credenza. It appeared that someone had attempted to bind Rasmussen. (Note: In an interview to promote The Lazarus Files, his 2019 book about the case, McGough said that one of the detectives believed that the ligature marks suggested Lazarus intended to force Rasmussen into her car, drive it out into the desert and kill her there. At her parole hearing in 2023, Lazarus admitted to having used cord in an attempt to bind Rasmussen. Asked to explain why, she said that Rasmussen stood between her and Ruetten. When pressed about how tying Rasmussen up would have allowed her to see him, she responded that "it makes no sense".) She had defensive wounds and a bruise on her face that appeared to have been inflicted by the muzzle of a gun. The gun had been fired through a quilted blanket, apparently to muffle the sound. The investigating criminalist also observed a bite mark on Rasmussen's arm and took a swab from it for blood typing.

== Investigations ==
=== Initial investigation ===
LAPD detectives investigating the case quickly concluded that Rasmussen had been surprised and killed by a burglar. Rasmussen's attire—a bathrobe, nightgown, and underwear—suggested she was not expecting visitors. Although a maid in a neighboring unit reported hearing screaming and fighting, she did not recall hearing gunshots. She thought the whole event had been a domestic dispute and did not call the police. It appeared that the perpetrator had been in the process of taking the electronic equipment left in a stack at the base of the stairs when Rasmussen came upon them. Jewelry had been left behind and the vehicle taken. The only other item that appeared to have been taken from the home was the couple's marriage license, which Sherri's mother believed she might have been carrying in her purse to facilitate consolidating her and Ruetten's bank accounts. An autopsy found all the bullets inflicted injuries severe enough to have resulted in death by themselves shortly afterward. Fifteen separate injuries were noted on Rasmussen's face, including the apparent muzzle bruise and a laceration of the frenulum between the upper lip and jaw, suggesting she was struck forcefully in that area.

Lead detective Lyle Mayer considered other possibilities. He quickly ruled out Ruetten as a suspect. Nels Rasmussen and his wife, Loretta, told Mayer about Lazarus's harassment, and saw that he made a note of it. Ruetten later told police that he and Sherri had never discussed Lazarus. Ruetten said later that he told the detectives about Lazarus when they raised the possibility of a jealous former lover at a second interview the morning after the crime. However, he did not tell them about his final sexual encounter with her, nor the confrontation where she told Rasmussen about that liaison. (Note: McGough speculates that Ruetten may have felt some responsibility for his wife's death as a result of those events, and thus was too ashamed to admit them to Mayer and Hooks.) Nels Rasmussen also told the police about her, but Mayer dismissed it, telling him "there's nothing there" in Nels's recollection.

The police remained focused on the possibility of burglary, especially in light of one reported later in the same area, in which one of the two reported suspects had been carrying a gun, possibly a .38 like the one that had fired the three bullets, later identified by experts as Federal .38J Plus-P, into Rasmussen's chest. But the crime had some atypical elements for a burglary. Mayer noted that it was unusual for burglars to steal a car after the crime; they usually brought their own vehicle to load stolen goods in. To him, this meant there were likely two burglars. His partner, Steve Hooks, found the bite mark unusual, as bites during struggles are much more commonly inflicted by women, while the majority of burglars are men. However, because men have bitten opponents during fights as well, the burglary theory stood.

Eleven days after Rasmussen's death, her BMW was recovered after an officer saw it parked on the street near the intersection of Zombar Avenue and Cohasset Street, in a residential neighborhood roughly two miles (3.2 km) east of the Ruettens' condo. It was unlocked with the keys in the ignition. (Note: McGough speculates it might have been left there in that condition in the hope that a student at a nearby school for troubled youth would have been tempted to take it for a drive and made an excellent suspect in the case if caught. While it is presumed Lazarus fled the crime scene in the BMW, how she got there that morning is unknown.) While crime-scene technicians found some possible bloodstains and fiber evidence in the car along with four fingerprints that were neither Rasmussen's nor her husband's, a search of the area yielded no other evidence. Whether the car had been there for the entire time since the killing has never been determined. Nonetheless, Mayer believed that location strengthened the burglary theory since burglars were known to live in that area. (Note: Blood typing evidence suggested a second person had been present. However, Sherri Rasmussen had an anomalous blood subtype that, under the ABO blood testing available at the time, could inaccurately appear as two different types. Later, more sophisticated testing showed all the blood was hers.) In April, a man arrested after a burglary in progress at a similar condo in Van Nuys where a stereo was taken, appeared to Mayer to be the prime suspect in the case, but was ruled out when his fingerprints did not match.

=== Cold case ===
The suspected burglars to whom detectives ascribed the crime remained at large, despite a follow-up newspaper story eight months later and a reward offered by the Rasmussen family. The LAPD, preoccupied with the violence resulting from gang wars and the crack epidemic plaguing the city at the time, was unable to devote much more attention to the case. The Rasmussens said that detectives at the Van Nuys office were often unhelpful when the family called, hanging up or putting them on indefinite hold.

Ruetten briefly returned to the condo, but moved out after a month when it became too much psychologically and financially. After taking a leave of absence from Micropolis, he moved back to live with his parents in San Diego. Lazarus briefly reunited with Ruetten on a 1989 Hawaii vacation; he recounted later having seen her on occasion over the next two years and occasionally having sex. Mayer's notes show that Ruetten had called him and asked if he was absolutely sure there was no evidence linking Lazarus with his late wife's death. In 1991, after moving back to the Los Angeles area for another job, Ruetten met his second wife.

A year after the crime, the frustrated Rasmussen family reiterated their reward offer at a news conference and called for more action. Nels wrote to Daryl Gates, then chief of the LAPD, about the possibility that Lazarus might have been involved. Detectives told him he "watch[ed] too much television." He continued to publicize the reward, and later worked with the short-lived television series Murder One on a segment inspired by the case. In 1988 Sherri's other sister suggested true-crime writer Anne Rule, a fellow Seattle resident, write a book about the case. Rule was interested, and Sherri's parents met with her. Nels told her about the Lazarus angle, and Rule said she would have a friend, a retired LAPD detective who assisted her with research, ask around. A few days later, Rule told Nels that this man had told her that the case was "too hot to handle" so she would not write about it.

Nels in particular was unconvinced that Sherri – who was six feet (1.8 m) tall, had a large frame, and was in good physical shape – had been the victim of a botched burglary. It would have been a struggle for anyone to subdue her in close quarters. Mayer had told him at one point that the events lasted from 45 minutes to an hour and a half, a long time for burglars who were believed to be primarily after items of value in the home. Rasmussen further doubted that any struggle would have lasted that long if the assailant had been male. Further, whoever shot his daughter had fired directly into her chest at close range and taken the trouble to muffle the shot with the quilt. This suggested that the killing was deliberate and not the accidental byproduct of a struggle.

Mayer retired in 1991 and Hooks was reassigned to another division a few years later. The new detective assigned to the case told Nels Rasmussen that he was unable to follow up on Mayer's notes and did not think that any new leads would emerge. Nels was rebuffed again in 1993 when he offered to pay for DNA testing on the evidence, now that the technology was available. He was told that the police had to have a suspect in order to proceed with testing (in October of that year, LAPD records show, detectives showed renewed interest in the case after a year and a half when nothing was done). In 1997 a former coworker of Sherri's secretary contacted police about how, some time after the killing, the woman recounted to her the January 1986 incident where Lazarus had confronted Sherri in her office, but no attempt was made to follow up before the secretary died three years later.

Lazarus continued her LAPD career. She also started her own private investigation firm, Unique Investigations. In 1994, after stints at the department's Drug Abuse Resistance Education (DARE) and background investigations of new recruits, she was promoted to detective. Three years later, she married a fellow officer she met while teaching a DARE class in Oregon and adopted a daughter with him, moving back to Simi Valley; he later joined the LAPD as well. At work she became an instructor at the police academy. For two periods during the 1990s, she was assigned to the Van Nuys division, where the records from the original investigation of Sherri Rasmussen's murder were still on file. Between her tenures at Van Nuys she was assigned to the LAPD's internal affairs division for a year. Department records show that in both the background and internal affairs positions she distinguished herself with the thoroughness and tenacity of her investigations.

==== DNA test on bite swab ====
In the late 1990s, after DNA testing had become more prominent and techniques improved, the LAPD formed a new unit that looked through the forensic evidence collected from the department's cold case files to determine whether any had the potential for new leads through DNA testing. The evidence seen as likely to do so was collected from the Rasmussen residence and in 2004 criminalist Jennifer Francis was able to analyze it. Some of the evidence from the Rasmussen case that might have had the suspect's DNA was missing after the 1993 reinvestigation. Unusually, Francis had access to not just the sample but the entire case file to help her decide which other samples to analyze.

Francis's DNA tests on the blood revealed that Rasmussen had a rare blood subtype which inaccurately suggested two separate sources for the blood collected at the scene with the ABO testing available at the time. All of the samples taken came from Rasmussen. She turned instead to the bite swab, which the detective she was working for had noted was missing from the property log, as it was unlikely Rasmussen had bitten herself. Calls to the county coroner's office initially found it missing there, too, until she reached the criminalist who had originally collected it. He told her that samples that old had not been logged into the office's computer data base when it was established; it was found after searching the lab's freezers.

Francis did not find any matches in the Combined DNA Index System (CODIS) database, but did find that the saliva in it had come from a female, undermining the initial burglary theory. Upon discovering that the biter (and likely perpetrator) was female and distinct from Rasmussen, she reviewed the case file and came across a report of a "third-party female" who had allegedly harassed the victim at her job and residence before the murder. She believed this might have been a Glendale nurse angry with Rasmussen at being passed over a promotion.

Francis asked the detective supervising her if this woman had been investigated, to which he supposedly responded with, "Oh, you mean the LAPD detective". Francis was unaware of Lazarus, having overlooked the one vague reference to her in the file. He explained that the detective, a former girlfriend of the victim's husband, (Note: Francis also recalls the detective not only telling her that Ruetten had remarried since Rasmussen's killing but that his second wife was of Asian descent, neither of which were noted in the case file at the time.) was "not a part of this." He insisted that the case was simply a burglary, likely committed by a man and woman working together, as the department had long concluded. No other detective would pursue the case, and the evidence went back into the files.

=== Second investigation ===
In March 2008, Van Nuys homicide detective Jim Nuttall came into work one morning and found a box with two case files left on the floor near his desk. One was the Rasmussen killing. He reviewed the file and found that there was plenty of evidence to possibly solve a cold case, particularly one where the victim seemed particularly undeserving of her fate. He and his partner Pete Barba agreed it was not likely that it was a burglary, because the DNA test pointed to a female suspect, and that they would start from the beginning.

Nuttall and Barba looked at the case as a murder, with the burglary staged to throw the police off the trail. Some aspects of the crime were implausible for a break-in, especially one committed in daylight:

- Rasmussen's jewelry box was in plain view atop her dresser and had not been touched.
- The condo was in the middle of a gated complex, surrounded by other units from which burglars could have expected to be easily observed.
- The front door had an alarm warning, and had not been forced open, as it might have been if the putative burglars had not expected anyone to be at home.

The stack of stereo equipment atop a VCR at the base of the stairs was also inconsistent with the burglary theory. (Note: In August 1985, Lazarus wrote in her diary of taking a report on a house burglary in which the resident's stereo was the only item stolen.) If, as the evidence suggested, the struggle between Rasmussen and her attacker had begun upstairs and then continued downstairs, that stack would likely have been knocked downstairs and scattered as well. It made more sense to assume that it had been stacked afterwards, although a burglar would have fled the scene immediately after the shooting.

The forensics reinforced this theory. On a record player atop the stack was a thumb-shaped bloodstain. It had no print, suggesting whoever left it was wearing gloves. But the blood was Rasmussen's, suggesting the equipment had been stacked after the struggle and shooting to make the crime look like a botched burglary. From the four bound volumes of the murder book (as LAPD personnel refer to case files), they developed a list of five female suspects. Nuttall was taken aback when Ruetten told him over the phone that Lazarus was a police officer. By then, Lazarus had been promoted to a higher rank of detective and was working art theft cases as part of the Commercial Crimes Division. (Note: She is one of the detectives followed in Joshua Knelman's 2012 book Hot Art: Chasing Thieves and Detectives Through the Secret World of Stolen Art.)

As one of the two detectives in the nation's only full-time art theft unit, Lazarus had gained some local media attention when she and her partner had recovered a statue stolen from Carthay Circle. Off the job, Lazarus had been active in the Los Angeles Women Police Officers Association and organized childcare for families of officers. The detectives ranked Lazarus as the least promising of the five suspects, since Ruetten had said their relationship was long over.

Nuttall and Barba's investigations soon eliminated all but one of the other women. That one, the disgruntled nurse, was eliminated by a covertly collected DNA sample. With only Lazarus left, they kept their investigation a closely guarded secret. Her husband also worked as a detective in Van Nuys (although he was not personally known to Barba and Nuttall) and she may have had other friends who could have tipped her off. If she were the killer, she could have improved her defense; if she were not, then they would have inadvertently smeared a fellow officer with no record of disciplinary investigations or civilian complaints. They referred to her only as "No. 5", worked on the case after hours or behind closed doors, and developed cover stories to explain why they wanted to look at personnel records for one particular officer from 20 years ago.

The detectives began looking into other aspects of Lazarus's life during the mid-1980s. Another detective recalled that, at that time, most LAPD officers had preferred a .38 as their backup or off-duty carry gun as they were required to purchase only weapons compatible with the Federal Plus-P ammunition used in the murder. State and departmental records showed the .38 Lazarus owned at the time. Thirteen days after the killing, she reported it stolen to Santa Monica police (but not to her own department's armorer, as required by law and department policy, and as she did with an apparent replacement she bought a month later). (Note: Lazarus had also told her patrol partner at the time that her gun had been lost from a fanny pack while she was out jogging, rather than stolen from her car. He also did not recall seeing any damage to that car consistent with a break-in, and the Santa Monica police do not seem to have examined it when Lazarus reported the theft.) Since it had been reported stolen from near a popular pier, they assumed she had thrown the gun into the Pacific Ocean. (Note: McGough said in his interview that some of the investigators have speculated that the gun may actually be somewhere other than the ocean, perhaps in concrete or buried near Lazarus's house at the time. At her parole hearing in 2023, Lazarus admitted to disposing of the gun out of fear she would be a suspect in the killing, but did not provide details as to how or where.) Without the weapon, DNA would be the only definite way to connect the crime to Lazarus.

From their own experience, Nuttall and Barba theorized about how an LAPD officer would commit a murder. It would be better to do it on a day off, they concluded, and records showed that Lazarus had been off the day of the killing. Officers would know better than to use their duty gun, since it would have to be disposed of after the crime and the penalties for losing a duty gun or failing to prevent its theft were severe. Instead, it made sense to use a backup gun such as Lazarus's .38. Last, a working patrol officer would know how to do just enough to make the crime scene look like an interrupted burglary to satisfy an overworked detective.

Rasmussen's father Nels told Nuttall about Lazarus's continued contact with his daughter. This was not recorded in the files, although he had mentioned it repeatedly to Mayer and Hook during interviews. Realizing that Lazarus was now their prime suspect, the detectives informed their superiors and arranged to discreetly collect a voluntarily discarded DNA sample from her, knowing they could do so without a warrant and avoid alerting Lazarus to the investigation. While off-duty, Lazarus discarded a cup she had been drinking from at the Simi Valley Costco, which other police retrieved. A sample taken from it matched the DNA from the bite mark on Sherri Rasmussen.

=== Arrest of Lazarus ===
Rob Bub, the homicide detective supervisor at Van Nuys, began letting his senior officers, all the way up to Chief William Bratton, know of the case along with senior prosecutors from the Los Angeles County District Attorney's office. It was transferred to the Robbery-Homicide Division (RHD), which handles many of the department's high-profile cases. On the day of the arrest in June 2009, dozens of officers were briefed on a search warrant they were only told would be executed outside the city. They were taken to wait in Simi Valley.

A short time later, RHD detectives Greg Stearns and Dan Jaramillo, who had been selected for their lack of personal connection to Lazarus, called her from the lockup at Parker Center, the department's headquarters. Bratton had ordered that location be used since Lazarus would have to surrender her gun and equipment belt in order to enter it, limiting the possibility she might react violently when realizing she was the prime suspect or when she was arrested after the interview. The detectives told her they had someone in custody who wanted to talk about an art theft.

After Lazarus had checked in her gun and entered the interrogation room, they explained that this was really about some loose ends they were trying to tie up in the Rasmussen case, since her name had come up in the investigation. They claimed they wanted a private setting because, while Ruetten was an old boyfriend, Lazarus had long been married to someone else and they did not want her private life to become the subject of office gossip. Stearns and Jaramillo knew they would have to tread carefully since Lazarus was well aware of police interview techniques and her rights to silence and legal counsel, which she could invoke at any time.

They rambled and digressed from the subject at times but eventually came back to Rasmussen. Lazarus claimed to recall little due to the intervening years, but gradually revealed more and more knowledge—including oblique acknowledgements of her visits to the Ruetten condo and Rasmussen's office—until she accused her colleagues of considering her a suspect. The detectives mentioned it was possible they had DNA evidence from the crime scene, and asked Lazarus if she would be prepared to provide a DNA sample. Lazarus stated that she might be prepared to, but said that she had to speak with somebody and thereafter left the room, where she was arrested.

After that, the police officer teams in Simi Valley began searching Lazarus's home and car. In her house they found her mid-1980s diary, with numerous mentions of her love for Ruetten and despondence over his engagement. Her computer showed Internet searches for Ruetten's name on several occasions late in the 1990s.

LAPD officers were stunned at the idea that Lazarus might have murdered someone. Fellow detectives recalled her as vivacious and supportive (although some also recalled that her behavior when angry had led some to refer to her as "Spazarus" behind her back). A case she had been developing from her art-theft work, with elder abuse and real estate fraud aspects, had to be dropped. It was unlikely to be prosecuted successfully if the lead investigator were facing a murder charge.

After her arrest, Lazarus was allowed to retire early from the LAPD; (Note: Since she had not been convicted of any crime at that point and had no disciplinary issues, she was allowed to receive a pension. According to McGough, she continues to do so and had collected nearly $67,000 by 2017.) she was held in the Los Angeles County Jail. A bail hearing was not held for almost six months. Judge Robert J. Perry set the amount at $10 million in cash, well above what the defense had suggested and more than twice what prosecutors had proposed. The case against Lazarus was very strong, he said, and she might well be a flight risk or attempt to obtain weapons through her husband. Lazarus's lawyer, Mark Overland, said the judge did not understand the case well and contrasted the high figure with the $1 million set for Robert Blake and Phil Spector when they were charged with murder.

== Trial ==
Over the next three years, Overland filed motions to dismiss the case, on the grounds that the evidence was too old for Lazarus to challenge, especially since she had not initially been identified as a suspect. He also sought to exclude significant evidence. The search warrant was defective, the interview admissions were obtained in violation of Lazarus's Fifth Amendment rights against compelled self-incrimination, and the DNA test results were obtained with unproven technology, Overland argued. Perry denied them all.

The case attracted considerable media attention. Many of its elements—a love triangle with a woman scorned, a cold case unsolved for over 20 years, and the accused killer revealed as a police officer—seemed drawn from the plots of popular televised police dramas and reality shows such as Snapped, Scorned: Love Kills, and Deadly Women. The Atlantic ran a feature story about the case before the trial, and Vanity Fair ran one by Mark Bowden afterward.

When the trial began in early 2012, prosecutors argued that Lazarus's motive for the murder was jealousy. In his opening argument, prosecutor Shannon Presby summed up the case as, "a bite, a bullet, a gun barrel and a broken heart." Ruetten testified, weeping several times. He allowed that having sex with Lazarus after he was engaged to Rasmussen was "a mistake". On cross-examination, Overland stressed the original burglary theory and pointed to evidence, such as the later similar burglary, that he said supported it. He also highlighted evidence not analyzed, such as a bloody fingerprint on one of the walls, to suggest that other suspects had not been adequately excluded. He questioned whether the weapon used was Lazarus's lost gun, as .38s were in wide use. He attacked the DNA from the bite mark vigorously, pointing to improper storage procedures and a hole the tube had left in its storage envelope which could have allowed Lazarus's DNA to be added to it later.

Overland presented the defense case over two days, disputing the prosecution's theme of a lovelorn Lazarus. Some of her friends testified that she showed signs of violence or despondence over Ruetten at the time of the killing. In contemporary excerpts from her diary, Lazarus wrote of dating several different men. Overland also reinforced his attack on the forensic evidence, with a fingerprint expert who said that some prints at the scene did not match Lazarus's.

Both prosecution and defense reiterated their themes in closing arguments. After showing the jury photographs of a beaten, bloodied Rasmussen, prosecutor Paul Nunez told them, "It wasn't a fair fight ... This was prey caught in a cage with a predator." Overland dismissed the entire case as circumstantial "fluff and fill", save for the "compromised" bite-mark DNA sample. He moved for a mistrial after Nunez reminded the jurors that Lazarus had provided no alibi, since defendants' refusal to testify cannot be held against them. Perry denied this motion, saying he did not take Nunez's statement as directly suggesting Lazarus had refused to testify and thus her Fifth Amendment right against self-incrimination had not been violated.

In March, after several days of deliberations, the jury convicted Lazarus of first-degree murder. Later that month, she was sentenced to 27 years to life in prison. As of 2026, Lazarus is incarcerated at the California Institution for Women in Corona.

== Appeal ==
Lazarus appealed her conviction in May 2013. Her attorney, Donald Tickle, argued that Perry had erred in ruling for the prosecution on all four pretrial motions. Overland, Tickle argued, should also have been allowed to cross-examine FBI burglary expert Mark Safarik about the other burglary.

=== Decision ===
A panel of three judges—Audrey B. Collins, Thomas Willhite Jr. and Nora Margaret Manella—heard oral argument in the case in June 2015. A month later, they unanimously upheld Lazarus's conviction.

Lazarus and her attorneys, the panel held, had failed to establish that Perry's rulings resulted in any prejudice to her defense. Manella, writing for the panel, rejected the argument that the age of the case was an issue, observing that "the passage of time was more likely prejudicial to the prosecution than the defense." During her interview, Lazarus "had no objectively reasonable basis to believe she was compelled to answer" since she was not at that point under active criminal or departmental investigation. The MiniFiler DNA kit is sufficiently different from previous DNA test kits to have required a separate hearing on that issue. As for defense claims the DNA had been mishandled, since it had not requested separate hearings on that it had failed to preserve the issue for appeal, and it was not central enough to the case to make acquittal more likely in its absence. And, lastly, "cross-examining [Safarik] about a specific burglary that occurred on a later date in a different location would have had little bearing on the validity of his opinions and conclusions concerning the Rasmussen crime scene", Manella wrote.

The California Supreme Court declined to hear Lazarus's appeal.

== Criticism of investigation ==
As evidence was introduced at the trial, it became apparent that not all the evidence available and in possession of the LAPD had been found. Recordings and transcripts of interviews with both Nels Rasmussen and Ruetten that discussed Lazarus were absent from the file, although both remembered them when called to testify. Other aspects of the missing interviews are alluded to in other interviews in the file. The only mention of Lazarus during the initial investigation is a brief note of Mayer's in which he reports that Ruetten had confirmed that she was a "former girlfriend".

Journalist Matthew McGough reports on the apparent failings of the original investigation in his 2019 book The Lazarus Files. Evidence that might have led to Lazarus was not followed up. The toolmark on Rasmussen's body was visible, noted in the autopsy and photographed, but not matched to the muzzle of a .38 until 2009. Likewise, a bloody fingerprint visible and noted by criminalists on a digital disc player at the top of the stack of stereo equipment left near the front of the condo, a print most likely to have been left by the suspect rather than the victim, was never collected or photographed in identifiable detail, nor was the disc player itself taken into evidence by the LAPD. The description of the crime in the detectives' followup report written three months after the crime (later than procedure required) also states as fact events which were at best conjecture from the physical evidence.

In interviews after Lazarus had been arrested, Mayer defended his investigation. Admitting that he and other Van Nuys detectives had been fooled, he called it "absurd, unreal" that anyone would think he had steered the investigation away from Lazarus, whom he denied knowing in any way. Had he suspected a police officer's involvement, he would have reported it to his superior and internal affairs as Nuttall did years later. And had Lazarus been suspected at the time, Mayer added, there would have been very little they could have done since she would likely have exercised her rights to remain silent and have counsel present, leaving the case "dead in the water".

"If they had any suggestion she might be involved, they should very definitely have taken a look at her", Gates, by then retired, said after Lazarus's arrest. "Whether or not they did, I don't know. If the investigators failed to follow up, shame on them." He saw little point in formally revisiting the investigation since Mayer, Hooks and the other detectives involved had all retired and it could not change Rasmussen's death. But it had educational value in reminding detectives to keep an open mind and not bind themselves to a particular case theory too early. "I've seen too many cases where that tunnel vision did not serve the department well", Gates said.

=== Possibility of evidence tampering by police ===
It's really hard to know what could be missing, if it's already gone.

— Matthew McGough, in 2025,

There are also discrepancies in the case file and missing evidence that, McGough writes in his book, do not appear to result from incompetence. (Note: After Lazarus's arrest, LA Weekly recalled that in 1986 the LAPD might have wanted to avoid yet another scandal involving murder charges against an officer. Two officers were at the time facing trial for both a plot to murder a sex worker for the insurance money and the contract murder of a local businessman; they became the first LAPD officers convicted of murder and were sentenced to life in prison. Another officer, later that year, was arrested for stealing luxury yachts and soon indicted in two murders for hire which he, too, would later be convicted of.) Most prominent among them is the absence of handwritten accounts from Mayer and Hooks of their investigative actions during the first three months after Rasmussen's murder. LAPD protocol at the time called for a handwritten chronological record of detectives' actions called the "chrono", along with documents obtained through investigation, to be collated into a loose-leaf binder referred to colloquially as the "murder book", with the handwritten records duplicated by a typed transcript to facilitate review by supervisors who had to sign off on them and detectives who might later take over the case. (Note: Today these are all done on computers.) When McGough asked the department if it could locate the handwritten notes, he was told the murder book contained all the records the department was aware of. Nuttall noted the missing handwritten chrono when he began reviewing the case in 2008; it could not be determined when it was removed. (Note: The chrono also contains a brief memo, dated April 8, 1986, apparently signed by Gates, noting that the file had been reviewed and approved by the department's Inspection and Control Section and found it to reflect "a well-reasoned, carefully-documented and insightful investigation". It was addressed to Hooks, rather than Mayer, the senior detective on the case, as it would normally have been. Mayer told Gough he did not know about it nor recall any higher-level interest in the case. In an interview after Lazarus's arrest, Gates said he did not remember writing the memo and remembered little about the case.)

External image
- The first page of the chrono in the Rasmussen case, with Ruetten's name repeatedly misspelled

The typed chrono has its own oddities. Ruetten's last name is consistently spelled "Ruetter", suggesting a conscious effort rather than a onetime mistake, making it harder to find him should another investigator have sought to. Additionally Mayer's last name is consistently spelled "Mager" in the chrono. The notes in the typed chrono do not, as they were required to, end with the initials of the recording detective, nor do they indicate who typed them. McGough also observes that the typed chrono uses the same spacing and typeface throughout, suggesting to him that it was typed in a single sitting by the same typist. During the 1990s, he notes, Lazarus, by then a detective, was twice assigned to Van Nuys, where the Rasmussen murder book was easily accessible in the detectives' office. Colleagues from that era recalled that Lazarus frequently volunteered to work the overnight shifts, when the detective at the division was unsupervised. There were few other officers on duty and not much need for her to go into the field.

According to Ruetten and the Rasmussens, the chrono also does not record some aspects of the investigation they recall. Ruetten recalls that early on he was asked to take off his shirt to be examined for possible scratches, and was photographed without it. This would suggest that evidence that Sherri might have injured her attacker had been found, (Note: Lazarus's patrol partner in the days after the murder testified that while he did not recall seeing any visible injuries on her, he did not remember much specifically about working with her.) but this is not recorded in the chrono. There is also no record of a polygraph test Ruetten's sister-in-law says he later recalled being given the day after the crime. Her parents also recall Mayer mentioning Ruetten having taken one when they spoke to him two days later. The records do show that during a polygraph Ruetten was given two weeks later, he was very emotional and gave answers with "major discrepancies" but it was considered inconclusive. McGough questions why detectives found it necessary to give Ruetten another polygraph test at that point, since his alibi had been corroborated and they had, by then, apparently settled on the botched-burglary theory.

Nels Rasmussen made regular pleas to the detectives, both by phone and in person, to look into Lazarus, but those conversations are not mentioned. Lazarus is not mentioned in the chrono until a November 1987 note that Ruetten had confirmed her name, around a time when the Rasmussens were planning to hold a news conference and offer reward money. A note also says they had been updated on the case weekly, which they did not recall. Mayer has adamantly denied interviewing Lazarus, but acknowledged he was not the only detective working the case. But during her time working for the department's background section in the early 1990s, one colleague says Lazarus mentioned having been interviewed as part of a homicide investigation involving a former boyfriend's missing wife who may have been shot. During the Parker Center interview that preceded her arrest, Lazarus also said a detective spoke to her about the Rasmussen case but was vague about details.

A statement in the murder book from a neighbor of the Ruettens apparently signed by her in 1986 is, in McGough's words, "impossible to reconcile" with her trial testimony a quarter-century later, during which she said some of the earlier statements were incorrect: The Ruettens' garage door had been open, with neither car visible, an hour earlier than claimed in the 1986 statement, and her husband could not have seen it on his way to work as he was retired. She also testified that condo workers had brought her Sherri's purse at noon that day, not 4:30 p.m. as stated.

In 1993, when the Rasmussens were offering to pay for DNA analysis of the evidence, the chrono records the Van Nuys detectives ordering new tests on the latent fingerprints and checking records to see if any recent parolees at the time might be possible suspects. It does not record any visit to the county coroner's office, where contemporary records show that a detective checked out trace evidence such as hair samples (while the bite swab that later incriminated Lazarus was left behind). When asked in 2009, the detective verified his signature on the form but did not recall ever having been to the coroner's office nor working the case.

Several months after Lazarus's arrest, Nels and Loretta Rasmussen filed a notice of claim with the city, a necessary step before suing. They made two allegations: Lazarus had murdered their daughter, and the LAPD had abetted her coverup efforts for over two decades. It was referred to Internal Affairs, which put both claims on hold pending the disposition of the criminal trial. The officer who investigated the claim never talked to the Rasmussens and recorded that writing the report took four of the seven hours she spent on the case. Two weeks after Lazarus's conviction, the claim was closed. The first allegation was sustained automatically due to the conviction, although no disciplinary action could be taken since Lazarus was no longer a current employee. The second was ruled unfounded, with a note from a commander that "we do not condone murder".

In 2025, McGough called the LAPD internal investigation a "sham ... They quietly closed it." He believed the investigators knew what they might find if they looked closely. "It's police culture", he told The Los Angeles Times. "It's a sense of 'This could look bad, and we're not going to go there.'"

== Litigation alleging police malfeasance ==
Two lawsuits have been filed based on these allegations. One, by Nels and Loretta Rasmussen, was dismissed as time-barred. The other, a whistleblower suit by Francis, ended with a judgment for the city. She alleged misconduct in not only the Rasmussen case but other high-profile investigations, and that she and others suffered retaliation and harassment when they tried to accurately report their results.

=== Rasmussens ===
In 2010, the Rasmussens filed a civil lawsuit against the city, the LAPD, Ruetten (named only as an indispensable party without any specific claims), Lazarus and 100 Does. They alleged that the coverup and the LAPD's hostility toward them amounted to a violation of their civil rights, intentional infliction of emotional distress and fraudulent concealment. They further alleged wrongful death against Lazarus and the Does.

Since the civil-rights claim included a violation of Section 1983, the city successfully petitioned for removal to federal court. After the Rasmussens stipulated to dropping the federal claim with prejudice, waiving the right to any further legal action against the city at that level, they were allowed to refile an amended claim in state court in 2011. There, the city was found to be immune from liability for all of the claims except the civil rights violation. When the Rasmussens filed an amended complaint consisting of just that, the judge dismissed it as barred by their earlier stipulation in federal court. The dismissal was upheld on appeal, where the court held that the Rasmussens' time to sue was limited once they broke off contact with the LAPD in 1998 and the case was time-barred after 2000. The California Supreme Court declined to hear the case.

At the time the Rasmussens filed suit Lazarus had argued the statute of limitations had expired. Six years later, she was automatically held liable for Rasmussen's death due to her murder conviction. Lazarus moved to have the suit dismissed on the grounds that the Rasmussens had filed it too early, before her conviction, and that California law required them to wait until after she was paroled. The court rejected that argument, a decision upheld on appeal since in California that prematurity defense is waived if not raised at the time suit is filed.

=== Jennifer Francis ===
Francis filed her suit late in 2013, following the rejection of her claim by the city and a finding by the state's Department of Fair Employment and Housing that she had a right to sue over her belief she had been pressured into not pursuing the Lazarus angle on the case. When Nuttall called her and told her the Van Nuys detectives had identified Lazarus as a suspect, she did not share what the detective had told her several years before, fearing retaliation. (Note: The day after Lazarus was arraigned, the detective had also emailed Francis apologizing to her for that conversation, which she took as further evidence that her impression of the conversation several years earlier was correct.) (Note: Francis also alleged in her suit that DNA evidence had been ignored or misreported in other cases.)

At the end of 2009, while prosecutors were preparing for the preliminary hearing in the Lazarus trial, she met with an assistant D.A. and told her about the resistance she had initially encountered over the possibility of Lazarus as a suspect in the Rasmussen murder. Several months later she was called into her supervisor's office and asked to relate those events. A month later, she told Detective Nuttall, who had spearheaded the reinvestigation that led to Lazarus's arrest, as well. The following month, she was called into her supervisor's office, and told to go to employee counseling service "because you look stressed." She believed this was punitive. Francis believed that the therapist who spoke with her seemed more interested in finding out what she knew about the Lazarus case and who she might have shared it with. After two sessions in which Francis declined to share that information, she was again called into her supervisor's office and told she was not cooperating and needed to "talk this out". She told the therapist she was getting a lawyer, after which further sessions were canceled as a "mistake".

Two detectives from RHD interrogated her the following month, July 2010. She told them she was concerned that events leading to Lazarus's arrest in which she was involved had been portrayed differently in the media than she recalled them, putting the department in a more favorable light. Nuttall as well, she recalled, had been placed in an equally difficult position, since he told her that Lazarus may have learned that they had reopened the investigation despite the precautions he and Barba had taken. The retaliation continued after Lazarus was convicted, Francis claimed. She faced more retaliatory action from her supervisors, whom she also accused of sexually harassing other female criminalists, and was again transferred. A report from the department's Inspector General on her complaint to Internal Affairs was delayed and appeared to have been reviewed by someone else prior to her receipt of it.

In 2015, the parties made motions to the judge as to what evidence could be heard by a jury at trial. At the beginning of 2017, Superior Court Judge Michael Johnson ruled that Francis could proceed to trial alleging a violation of state labor law. He found there were no triable issues of fact on her claims of harassment, discrimination, and retaliation. In April 2019, a jury found for the city. Three years later the California Court of Appeal affirmed the verdict, holding that she had not alleged a cognizable adverse employment action on the city's part.

== Parole request ==
In the early 2020s, California passed a law that allowed special parole consideration for those incarcerated who had been convicted of crimes committed while under 26. Lazarus was among those eligible. She abandoned her previous protestations of innocence, admitting to the murder at her initial suitability hearing in November 2023: "It makes me sick to this day that I took an oath to protect and serve people, and I took Sherri Rasmussen's life from her, a nurse".

Lazarus gave her account of the crime. That morning, she had once again called hoping to hear Ruetten's voice. Hearing Rasmussen's instead enraged her, and she resolved to go to the condo, determined to see him again. Lazarus said she planned to tie Rasmussen up if she had to in order to see Ruetten, a plan she admitted was illogical. "I was so angry that if she got in my way to see John, I was going to strangle her." After what she characterized as "a hellacious bar fight", she bound Rasmussen and shot her. (Note: Paul Nunez, one of the prosecutors at Lazarus's trial, does not believe this account is truthful. He doubts that Rasmussen would have opened the door and believes it more likely that Lazarus picked the lock to enter, if Rasmussen had locked it that morning. Nunez also thinks it likely that Lazarus knew that Ruetten was at work and thus Rasmussen was home alone. McGough said in his book interview that whether Lazarus actually intended to kill Rasmussen when she went to the Van Nuys house was still unclear. "Even if Stephanie decided to come clean now, 30 years later, I'm not sure she'd be a reliable narrator", he said.) Following the crime, believing she would be suspected, she disposed of her gun. After the panel hearing her request recommended parole and ordered a hearing to reconsider the evidence against her, Governor Gavin Newsom asked the full board to review the grant.

The full board heard testimony supporting her bid from justice reform advocates, among them former inmates who served time with Lazarus. They pointed to her relative youth at the time of the crime and her exemplary behavior in prison, helping other inmates rebuild their lives. "I saw many women who talked a big talk about giving back to the community. Stephanie actually accomplished it," said Jane Dorotik, who had served 12 years alongside Lazarus until her own murder conviction was reversed. In opposition, the board heard from Ruetten and some of Rasmussen's sisters about the continuing pain the crime has caused them. Rather than the act of an impulsive, lovestruck young woman, they said, the murder's planning and execution, including the subsequent coverup, was a calculated act that drew on Lazarus's training and experience as a police officer, knowledge they said she was still attempting to use to her advantage. After recounting the lengths Lazarus went to in preparing the crime, including improvising a silencer for her gun, and covering it up afterwards, LAPD Detective Stearns said: "Those are not the hallmarks of youthful offense. They are the hallmarks of criminal sophistication and maturity." Ruetten, who did not use Lazarus's name, was unimpressed by her confession several months earlier, saying she had only made it to get paroled. "She had 23 years to lie and to hide the evidence and to go on with her life when she could have turned herself in," agreed one of Rasmussen's nieces. A video Nels Rasmussen had recorded prior to his 2020 death for any possible future Lazarus parole hearing was played. "If one looks at the damage that she did to my daughter's face," he said, "it's almost like she wanted to destroy the beauty that Sherri exuded." The grant was rescinded in October 2024.

A 2025 request was denied. Parole Board commissioner Kevin Chappell cited discrepancies between the evidence and Lazarus's 2023 account of the murder. The minimal amount of Lazarus's DNA found, he said, suggested that the prolonged struggle she described had not occurred. "You were the only one engaging in this extreme act of violence," he told her. Lazarus had also claimed that her gun had fallen out of a fanny pack during the struggle; Presby, the prosecutor, said that too was not likely.

Lazarus will again be eligible for parole in 2028. Under special circumstances, she could apply again before then.

== See also ==
- Laurie Bembenek, a security officer convicted of killing the ex-wife of her husband, a veteran police officer.
- Crime in Los Angeles
- List of killings by law enforcement officers in the United States prior to 2009
