= Francis C. Whelan =

American judge

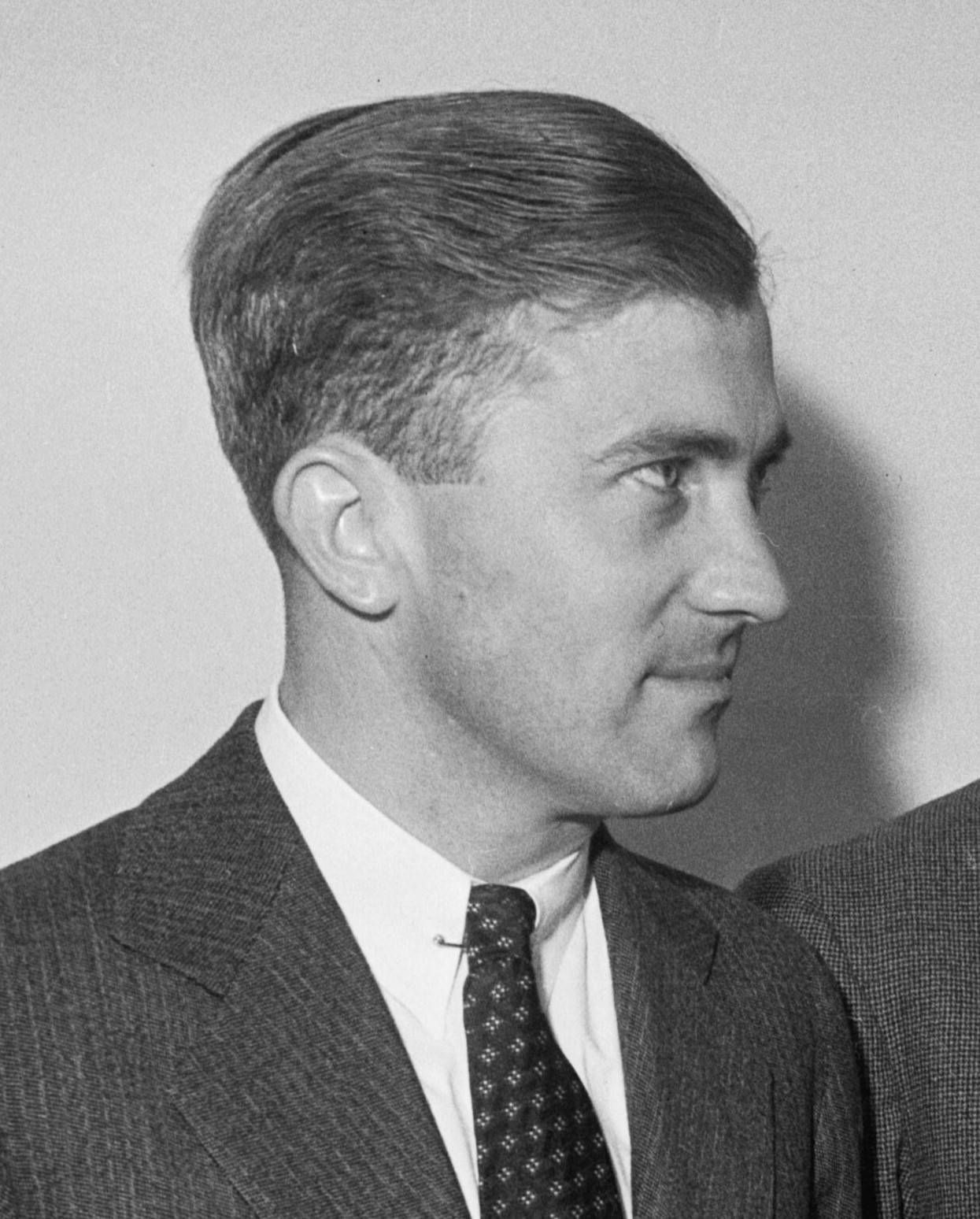
- Whelan in 1935

Senior Judge of the United States District Court for the Central District of California
- In office January 7, 1978 – August 22, 1991

Judge of the United States District Court for the Central District of California
- In office September 18, 1966 – January 7, 1978
- Appointed by: operation of law
- Preceded by: Seat established by 80 Stat. 75
- Succeeded by: Mariana Pfaelzer

Judge of the United States District Court for the Southern District of California
- In office September 15, 1964 – September 18, 1966
- Appointed by: Lyndon B. Johnson
- Preceded by: Leon Rene Yankwich
- Succeeded by: Seat abolished

Personal details
- Born: Francis C. Whelan; December 11, 1907 O'Neill, Nebraska, U.S.
- Died: August 22, 1991 (aged 83) Palm Desert, California, U.S.
- Education: San Diego State University (B.A.); UC Berkeley School of Law (J.D., LL.B.)

Francis C. Whelan (December 11, 1907 – August 22, 1991) was a United States district judge of the United States District Court for the Central District of California and the United States District Court for the Southern District of California.

== Education and career ==
Born in O'Neill, Nebraska, Whelan received a Bachelor of Arts degree from San Diego State University in 1928 and both a Bachelor of Laws and a Juris Doctor from the UC Berkeley School of Law in 1932. He was in private practice in San Diego, California from 1932 to 1935. He was an Assistant United States Attorney of the Southern District of California from 1935 to 1939. He was special assistant to the United States Attorney General of the United States Department of Justice from 1939 to 1948. He was in private practice in Los Angeles, California from 1948 to 1961. He was the United States Attorney for the Southern District of California from 1961 to 1964.

== Federal judicial service ==
Whelan was nominated by President Lyndon B. Johnson on August 17, 1964, to a seat on the United States District Court for the Southern District of California vacated by Judge Leon Rene Yankwich. He was confirmed by the United States Senate on September 15, 1964, and received his commission the same day. He was reassigned by operation of law to the United States District Court for the Central District of California, to a new seat established by 80 Stat. 75 on September 18, 1966. He assumed senior status on January 7, 1978. Whelan served in that capacity until his death on August 22, 1991, in Palm Desert, California.

== Sources ==
Legal offices
Preceded by Leon Rene Yankwich	Judge of the United States District Court for the Southern District of California; 1964–1966	Succeeded by Seat abolished
Preceded by Seat established by 80 Stat. 75	Judge of the United States District Court for the Central District of California; 1966–1978	Succeeded by Mariana Pfaelzer
