= Petroleum industry in Western Australia =

Overview of WA energy sector

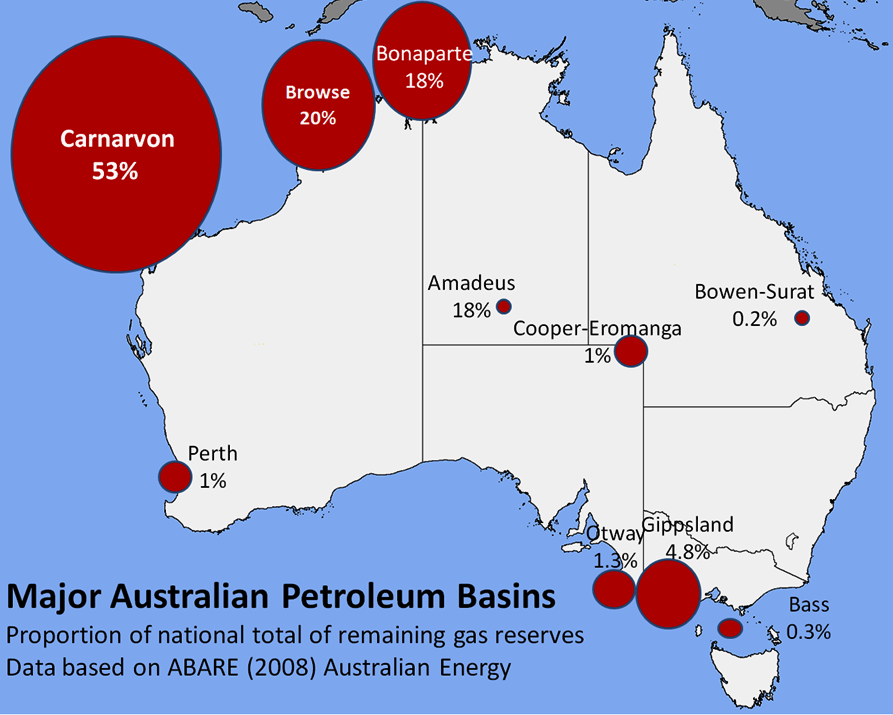
Western Australia's share of Australian gas reserves

Quarterly petroleum exploration expenditure ($millions) in Western Australia since 1994

The petroleum industry in Western Australia is the largest contributor to Australia's petroleum exports. Western Australia's North West Shelf (NWS) is the primary location from which production originates. Oil exports are shipped from Port Hedland.

Based largely on development of the reserves of the North West Shelf and onshore hydrocarbon basins, the industry extracts crude oil, condensate and natural gas from petroleum reservoirs deep beneath the Earth's surface. A large plant located at Withnell Bay near Dampier, produces liquefied natural gas (LNG) for export to Asian customers. Crude oil and most petroleum liquids are exported. Australia's largest petroleum refinery at Kwinana closed in 2021. Natural gas is processed at plants located on islands off the WA coast (e.g. The "Gorgon Gas Project" on Barrow Island) and onshore, then transported by pipelines to gas users throughout the state.

In 2007, the industry produced 126 million barrels (20,000,000 m^{3}) of crude oil/condensate, and 30 billion cubic metres of gas. Approximately 65% of the gas was transformed into 12 million tonnes of LNG (all of which was exported), with the remainder of the gas being sold to users in Western Australia. Primary production by the industry was valued at $16.7 billion, accounting for 31% of all natural resources produced in the state.

== Early history ==
The earliest petroleum-related activity in the state was in 1902, with the first oil exploration well drilled near the Warren River area in the southwest. Traces of oil were found in a bore near Fitzroy Crossing in 1919. Formal exploration in Western Australia started in 1946, when Ampol commenced an exploration programme, using the services of the Bureau of Mineral Resources (BMR) which had been set up by the Australian government in the same year to conduct survey work. In the following year, Ampol were awarded the first two exploration permits in Western Australia near Exmouth.

Large-scale surveys were conducted in the Canning Basin in 1947, and in the same year, Ampol secured exploration permits for the Exmouth region. Ampol formed a joint venture with Standard Oil of California. The new company was called WAPET, and drilled its first well at Rough Range in 1953. This well produced at a rate of 550 barrels per day (87 m^{3}/d), and was probably the commencement of Australia's commercial petroleum industry. In the following year, WAPET geologists conducted a basic survey of Barrow Island. They were the first civilians to visit the area since British atomic testing on the nearby Monte Bello Islands. The company achieved major commercial success with a large discovery on the island in 1964, which was followed by a large scale operation which continues to this day.

In 1966, WAPET discovered WA's first commercial quantities of natural gas near Dongara. Construction of the state's first gas pipeline was completed in 1971. The pipeline transported gas from Dongara to Perth, Kwinana and Pinjarra. Originally known as the WANG Pipeline (after WA Natural Gas Pty Ltd which was a WAPET subsidiary), it is still in operation and now known as the Parmelia Pipeline. Woodside received its first permits to explore the Carnarvon basin in 1963. The 1971 gas/condensate discoveries by the BOCAL consortium at Scott Reef, North Rankin and Goodwyn were followed by a further gas/condensate discovery at Angel in 1972.

== Geology ==
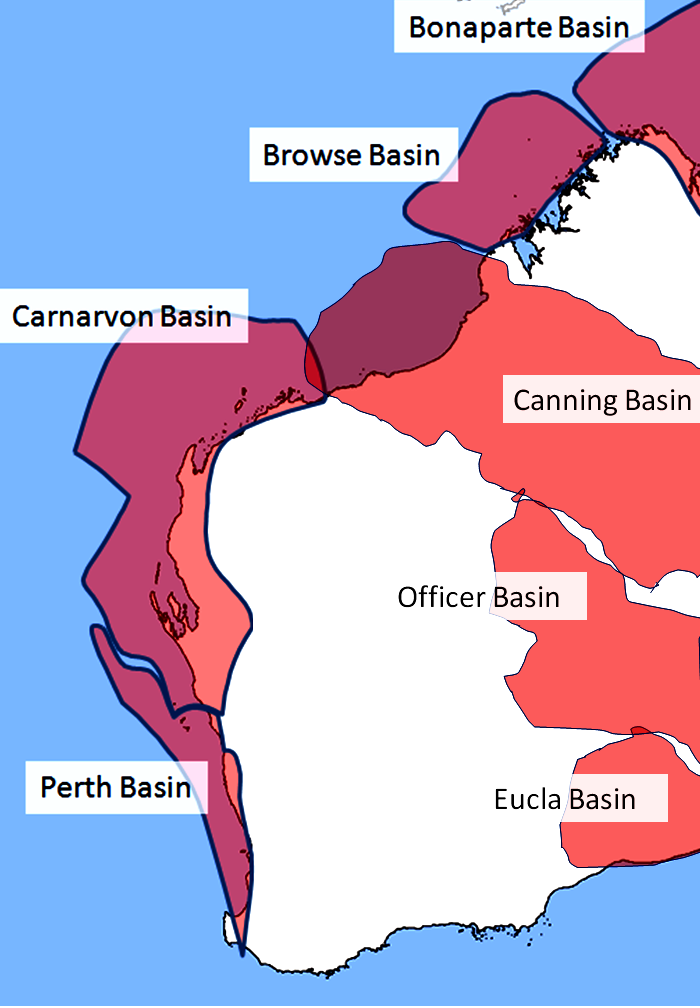
Western Australia's sedimentary basins

Five of the seven major sedimentary basins in Western Australia have known hydrocarbon accumulations, with 2007–08 production coming from the Carnarvon, Perth, Bonaparte and Canning basins. Sixty-one fields were on production during 2007–08 fiscal year. Petroleum in Western Australia is mostly sourced from the Carnarvon Basin, which stretches for 1,000 km of the west and northwest coast, from Geraldton to north of Port Hedland. In area, the onshore part of the Carnarvon Basin covers about 115,000 km^{2} and the offshore part covers approximately 535,000 km^{2} with water depths up to 3,500 m.

Less than 5% of the state's gas comes from fields near Dongara, part of the Perth basin, which extends about 1300 km along the southwestern margin of the continent. This is a large (172,300 km^{2}) basin that formed during the separation of Australia and Greater India in the Permian to Early Cretaceous period. It includes a significant onshore component and extends offshore to the edge of continental crust in water depths of up to 4500 m. The Officer basin, straddling the WA-SA border in the south-east section of the state, is a poorly explored basin, with limited seismic coverage, although more than 20 exploration wells have been drilled. A small amount of oil is produced in the Canning basin, in which 250 wells have been drilled and 78,000 line-km of 2D seismic surveys has been shot. A local company, Arc Energy, currently the largest Perth basin producer, is actively exploring and drilling in the Canning basin.

== Products ==
=== LNG ===
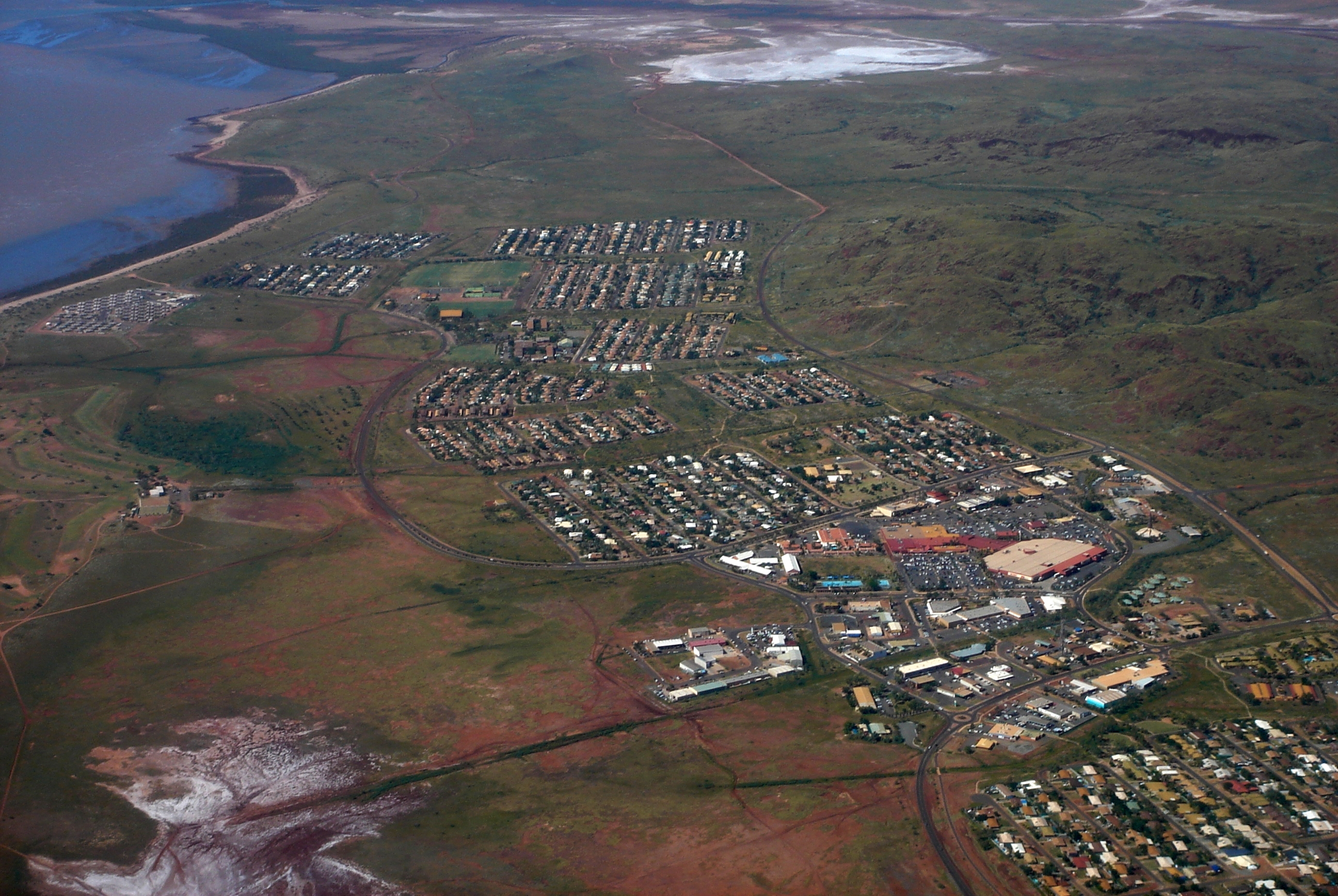
The town of Karratha, situated near the Burrup Peninsula, in the Pilbara region

The North West Shelf Venture (NWSV), a consortium of six energy companies led by Woodside, operates five LNG trains near Karratha. It relies on natural gas supplied from North Rankin, Goodwyn and Perseus fields in the Northwest Shelf (NWS). The majority of LNG produced by the NWSV is exported to Japan, with occasional spot sales to the United States, Spain and Korea. A fifth LNG train is currently under construction and is expected to increase export capacity by an additional 4.2 million tons, bringing total capacity to around 16 million tonnes per year. The cost of the project is estimated at $1.6 billion, with startup in late 2008.

Although the NWSV dominates Australia's LNG market, additional projects are in various stages of planning, the largest of which is the Gorgon gas project. Chevron (along with joint venture partners Shell and ExxonMobil) is considering development of the Greater Gorgon gas fields, which contain recoverable reserves of 40 trillion cubic feet (1,100 km^{3}). The project entails constructing subsea pipelines from the Gorgon and Jansz fields to Australia's Barrow Island, where 3 liquefaction trains will produce 15 million tons of LNG per year.

=== Domestic gas ===
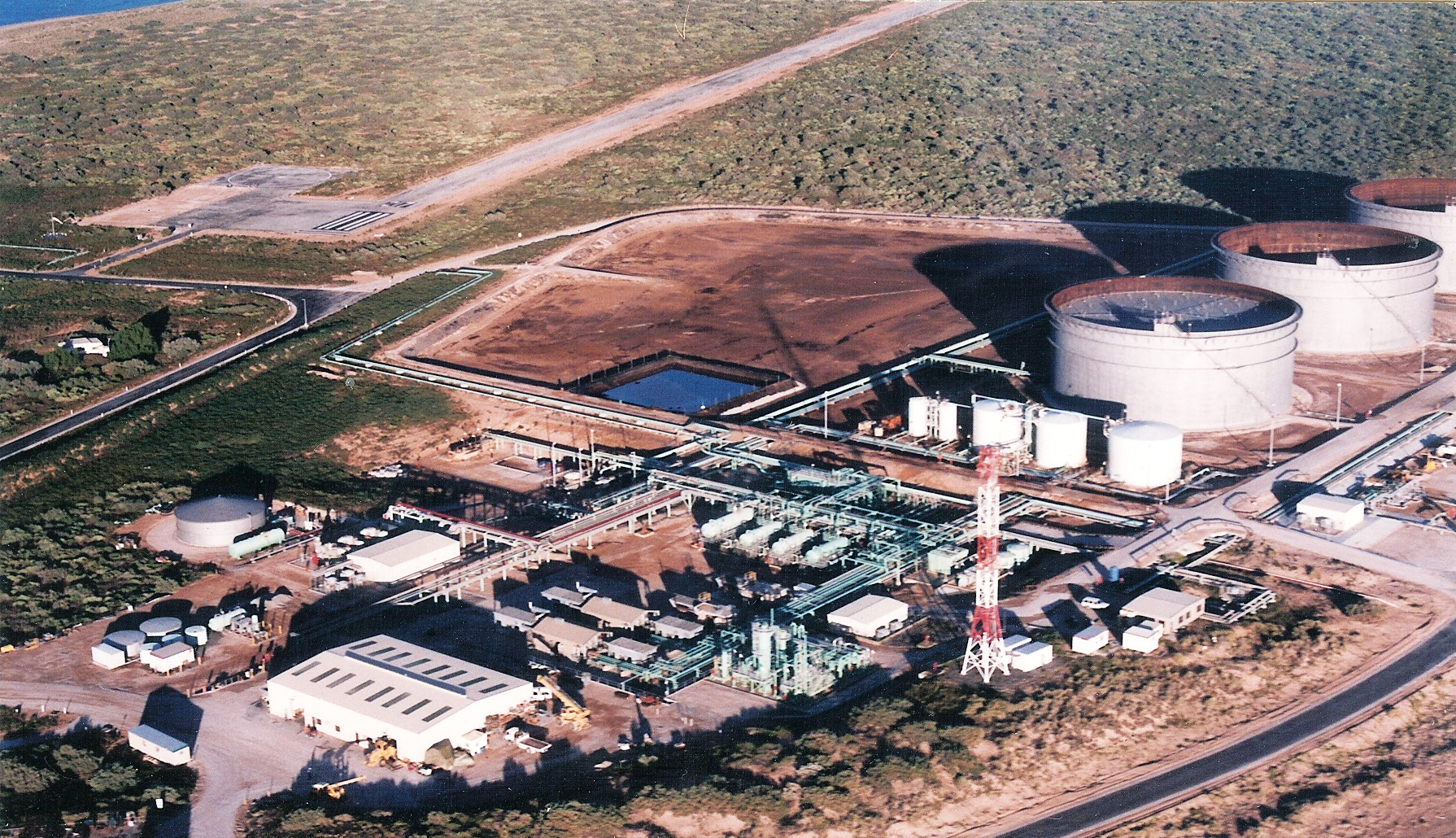
Petroleum treatment and storage facilities at Thevenard Island, approx 25 km off the coast near Onslow. A treatment plant produces gas for export via a subsea pipeline to customers on the mainland

In 2006-07, around two thirds of Australia's natural gas was produced in the Carnarvon Basin off the coast of Western Australia. Most of the gas produced in WA is transformed into liquefied natural gas (LNG) and exported to Japan. The remainder is used within the state. The domestic market for natural gas in WA, like that of Australia as a whole, is characterised by a small number of producers and a small number of large industrial consumers, with limited depth in consumption.

Total employment in the gas supply industry (thousands of people) since 1984

The state's two largest individual users of gas are Alcoa (which operates three alumina refineries in the south-west) and Burrup Fertilisers (which operates the world's largest ammonia plant on the Burrup Peninsula, near Dampier). Together they account for more than half of the natural gas consumed in WA. Most of the remaining gas is used for electricity generation and by other smaller industrial and commercial users. Residential gas users consume only about 2% of the natural gas produced in the state.

There are three main 'supply lines' for WA's domestic gas:

- 65% From the North-West Shelf domestic gas plant near Dampier, operated by Woodside Energy, transporting gas via the Dampier to Bunbury Natural gas Pipeline (DBNGP);
- 30% From the Varanus Island facility operated by Apache Energy on behalf of a number of production joint ventures. Output from the Varanus Island plant is divided between mineral processing operations who receive their gas via the Goldfields Gas Pipeline, and industrial and commercial customers in Perth and the southwest who receive their supplies via the DBNGP which links with the Varanus Island trunk line about 130 km south of Dampier; and
- 5% From small gas producers near Dongara, transported via the Parmelia Pipeline.

=== Petroleum liquids (Crude oil, condensate and LPG) ===
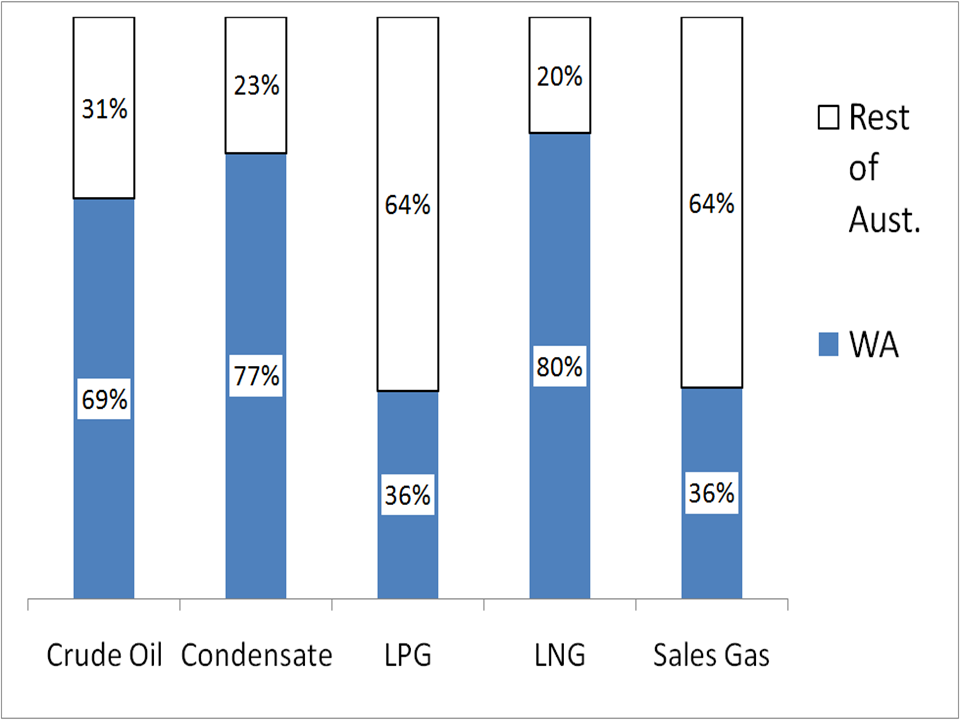
Western Australia's share of national petroleum production in 2007

Oil production in Australia increased gradually after 1980, peaking in 2000 at 805,000 barrels per day (128,000 m^{3}/d). In 2003, production fell dramatically to 630,522 bbl/d (100,245.0 m^{3}/d). In 2006, Australia produced approximately 562,000 bbl/d (89,400 m^{3}/d) of oil.

Western Australia is Australia's leading oil (and condensate) producing State, having surpassed Victoria, where production from the Gippsland Basin off the southern coast has been steadily declining. Western Australia currently produces 71% of Australia's crude oil and condensate. Australian crude oil and condensate production is projected to increase in the medium term (mainly due to new supply sources in Western Australia) before declining gradually.

== Sector organisation ==
Similar to petroleum industries in other market-capitalist economies such as those in Western Europe and North America, the structure of the WA petroleum industry is characterised by the involvement of private corporations, with an important regulatory role occupied by the federal and state governments in most aspects of the industry. Australian companies operating in the industry include Woodside Energy and Santos. Foreign-owned companies involved in the state include Apache Energy, BP, Chevron, ExxonMobil, Shell, Inpex and ConocoPhillips.

=== Government ===
Government involvement in the industry covers areas such as policy development, safety and environmental regulation, investment facilitation, provision of infrastructure, releases of new exploration areas, acquisition of regional geological data. The legal framework within which petroleum exploration and development occurs is a result of the division of responsibilities between the Commonwealth and the states/territories under the Constitution and inter-governmental agreements (in particular, the 1978-79 Offshore Constitutional Settlement).

Onshore, and out to 3 nm (nautical miles) from the territorial sea baseline (coastal waters), petroleum operations are the responsibility of the state government. WA's offshore areas beyond the 3 nm limit are governed by Commonwealth legislation (Offshore Petroleum Act 2005) administered by the Department of Innovation, Industry, Science and Research. The Law of the Sea Convention gives effect to a system of Exclusive Economic Zones under which nations have sovereign rights over natural resources out to 200 nm from the coast (Australia claimed such rights in 1994 under the Maritime Legislation Amendment Act 1994). The convention also allows Australia to claim sovereign rights over seabed resources where the continental shelf extends beyond 200 nm. State agencies also administer some aspects of federal petroleum-related legislation on behalf of the Commonwealth.

Commonwealth
Department / agency	Role
Department of Innovation, Industry, Science and Research	Advice and policy support regarding resources and energy
National Offshore Petroleum Safety Authority	Administers offshore petroleum safety legislation
Foreign Investment Review Board	Approval of foreign investments >$100 m
Geoscience Australia	Research and advice to government and industry on petroleum prospects, reserves and potential
Department of the Environment, Water, Heritage & the Arts	Project assessment and approvals under the Environment Protection and Biodiversity Conservation Act 1999 (EPBC Act)

State
Department / agency	Role
Department of Mines & Petroleum	Main state agency; facilitates state economic development and growth; exploration leases, production and pipeline licences
Economic Regulation Authority	Regulates monopoly aspects of the petroleum industry
Environmental Protection Authority	Advice to the Env. Minister; preparation of environmental protection policies; assessment of proposals and management plans
Office of Energy	Regulatory policy and structures for energy infrastructure

=== Production facilities ===

Production refers to the process of extracting the hydrocarbons from existing wells, along with initial separation of the wellstream components (which typically include varying proportions of crude oil, natural gas, and water), prior to transportation to end-use markets or further processing and refining. Most of the state's petroleum production occurs at offshore production platforms, although many wells are situated on the mainland and on several islands off the coast such as Thevenard Island and at Barrow Island where commercial oil production in WA commenced in 1964. WA's largest production platforms are North Rankin A and Goodwyn A - both operated by Woodside Energy - located approximately 130 km west of Dampier, where the ocean depth is about 100 m.

=== Transportation ===
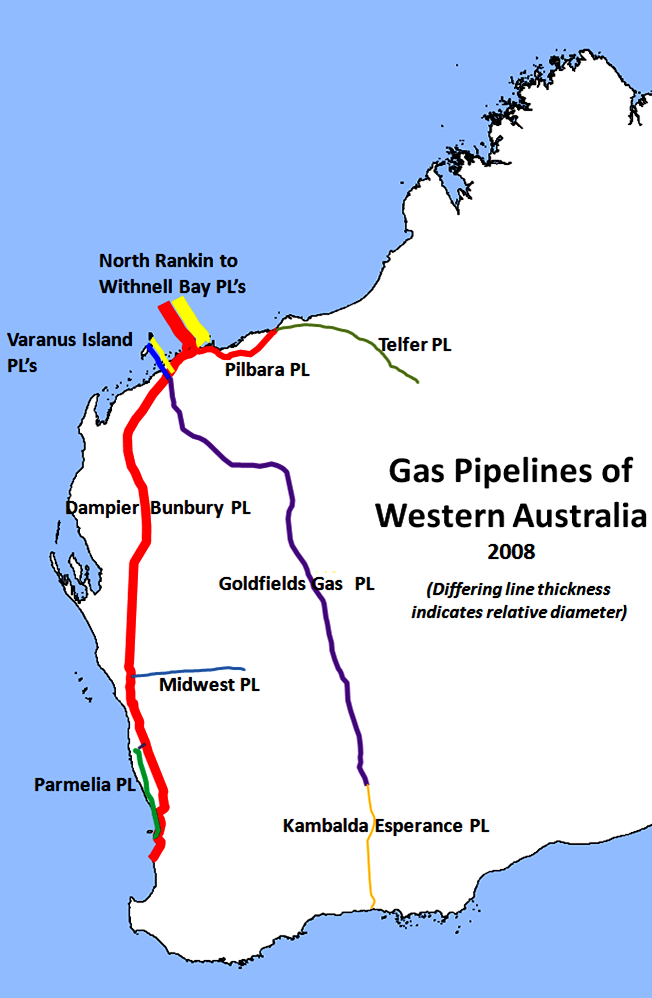
Locations of main gas pipelines in WA

There are currently four major natural gas transmission pipelines supplying the Western Australian gas market:

- Dampier to Bunbury Natural Gas Pipeline (DBNGP), which transports gas from the North West Shelf area to customers in the Geraldton, Perth, Mandurah and Bunbury areas;
- Goldfields Gas Pipeline (GGP), taking gas from Varanus Island to the Goldfields;
- Parmelia Pipeline, taking gas from various fields in the Perth Basin to customers in the State's South West; and
- Pilbara Energy Pipeline - from Dampier to Port Hedland.

=== Refining ===
Refining refers to the transformation of crude oil and condensate into end-use petroleum products. The Kwinana Oil Refinery was the state's only oil refinery, owned and operated by BP, was commissioned in 1955, but closed in 2021. With a production capacity of 132,050 bbl/d (20,994 m^{3}/d), it was the largest of Australia's seven refineries, accounting for almost 20% of national refining capacity. As most of the crude oil and condensate produced in WA is exported to Asia by ship, the Kwinana refinery relied mainly on shipments of crude oil from elsewhere in Australia and overseas. For many years, a small amount of crude oil has arrived for processing at the refinery via road tanker, having been produced at onshore wells near Dongara since the late 1960s.

The quantity of Perth basin oil production rose substantially in 2001 when the Cliff Head field (10 km off the coast near Dongara in 15 m of water) was brought into production., about 320 km north of Perth. The refinery mostly produced petrol and diesel, along with jet fuel, bitumen and liquid petroleum gas (LPG). Australia's refineries have experienced declining gross margins for several years, mainly due to competition from foreign refineries, an oversupply of refining capacity in Asia, and the high cost of transporting crude oil to Australia.

== Issues ==
=== Supply disruption ===
The state's heavy reliance on gas from the north west has become a prominent public issue on several occasions when disruptions to supply has occurred. On 18 February 2004, Western Power (electricity provider) imposed compulsory restrictions on power usage in Perth. This occurred on a day when the temperature was expected to reach nearly 42 °C and the company was unable to use its 'peakload' gas-fired power stations because of maintenance being carried out on the main pipeline from the north-west.

On 2 January 2008, an electrical fault resulted in a production shutdown at the North West Shelf Venture's Karratha Gas Plant. Production resumed on 4 January and normal gas supplies was re-established by 6 January 2008. It was a complete shutdown affecting both LNG exports and domestic gas production. Domestic gas supplies were cut by 2/3.

The most serious and significant disruption occurred in June 2008, when a pipeline rupture and explosion at the Varanus Island facility caused a 3-month shutdown of the plant, reducing the state's supply of natural gas by one-third.

=== Domestic gas reservation policy ===
In 2006, the state government announced a policy requiring that future developers of export gas projects set aside 15% of the reserves in each gas field for domestic use within the state. This policy replicated the initial State Agreement for the North West Shelf Project, and was based on a perceived decline in the availability of gas from non-export developments. For developers of large export projects, LNG exports generally offer higher returns than sales of gas into the domestic market. A federal parliamentary report referred to the state policy, stating that "while Western Australia presently consumes about 35% of Australia's domestic gas use, and the bulk of LNG exports, there is still a very healthy reserves-to-production ratio in excess of 100 years.

=== Garnaut Climate Change Review ===
Australia's ratification of the Kyoto Protocol treaty in March 2008 is likely to increase the country's use of natural gas to displace more carbon-dioxide-intensive coal. The first draft report of the Garnaut Climate Change Review (released on 4 July 2008), which identified the impacts of climate change on Australia and proposed numerous public policy measures designed to mitigate these effects, may have a significant impact on aspects of the industry. Among the measures proposed was an emissions trading scheme "which will make higher-emissions forms of energy generation more expensive, shifting demand towards lower-emissions sources, and towards technologies that capture and sequester emissions...and in transport, an emissions trading scheme will make higher-emissions forms of transport more expensive, shifting demand to lower-emissions forms"

=== Security ===
The Australian Strategic Policy Institute has identified petroleum facilities in Western Australia, including offshore platforms, ports, processing plants and pipelines, as potential targets of military or terrorist attack. Offshore structures and floating production and storage vessels have few defences against attack. In a 2005 report on maritime security threats, the Institute noted that in Australian petroleum production from onshore to offshore and from Bass Strait to the Northwest Shelf posed increasing risks for the Western Australian petroleum industry. In December 2004 the Australian Government announced a program of augmented security patrols in the Northwest Shelf area.
