= Dampier to Bunbury Natural Gas Pipeline =

Natural gas pipeline in Western Australia

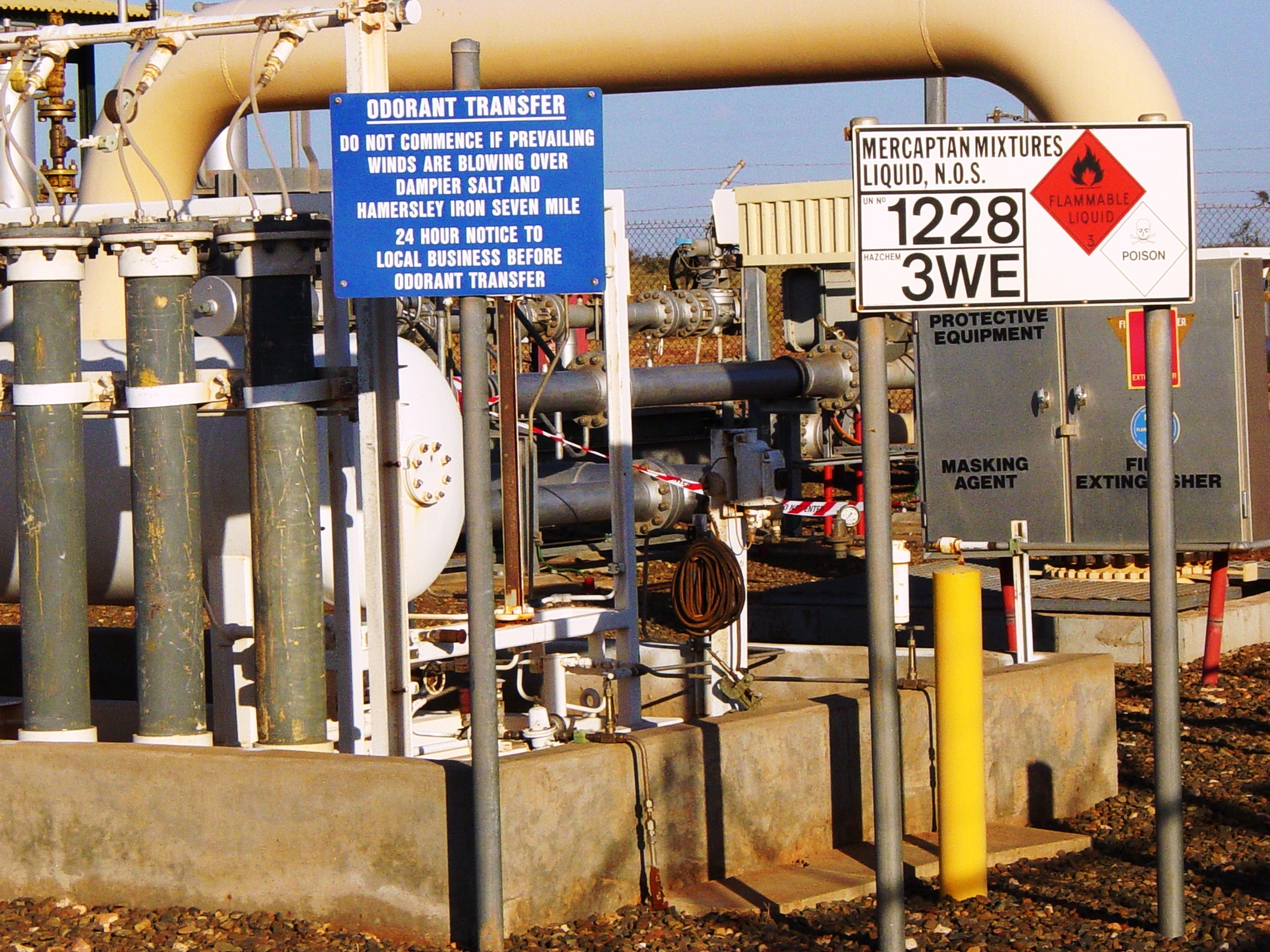
- An odourant injection station at MLV7 (main line valve) near Dampier, where Butanethiol is added to the natural gas inside the Dampier to Bunbury Natural Gas Pipeline

- Map of Dampier to Bunbury Natural Gas Pipeline

Location
- Country: Australia
- State: Western Australia
- Coordinates: 20.62°S 116.77°E
- Direction: North-South
- Start: Dampier
- To: Bunbury

General information
- Type: natural gas
- Contractors: State Energy Commission of Western Australia
- Construction started: 1979
- Commissioned: 1985

Technical information
- Length: 1,530 km (950 mi)
- Diameter: 660 mm (26 in)
- No. of compressor stations: 10

The Dampier to Bunbury Natural Gas Pipeline (DBNGP) is the longest natural gas pipeline in Australia. It is 660 millimetres (26 in) in diameter, which also makes it one of Australia's largest in terms of transmission capacity. At the time of its commissioning in 1984, it was one of the longest gas pipelines in Australia.

The pipeline runs within Western Australia from a point near Withnell Bay, on the Burrup Peninsula near Dampier, to Bunbury in the south-west of the state. It carries natural gas, most of which enters the pipeline at the domestic gas plant associated with the North West Shelf Venture project. The other main inlet point is approximately 135 kilometres (84 mi) south of Dampier, where one of the sales gas pipelines from Varanus Island Processing Hub connects with the DBNGP. In June 2008, following a pipeline rupture and explosion at the Varanus Island facility, the DBNGP carried additional volumes of gas from the North West Shelf plant to the south-west of the state, for a period of several months.

As a single trunkline it is 1,530 kilometres (950 mi) long, extending from the Burrup Peninsula in the Pilbara region, to Bunbury in the south west of Western Australia. It supplies gas to industrial, commercial and residential customers in Perth and major regional centres along the pipeline route. It is covered by Western Australian pipeline licence PL-40. A number of lateral pipelines are connected to this pipeline, most of which are covered by separate licences, although PL-40 itself covers the main trunkline and some laterals totalling a length of 1,789 kilometres (1,112 mi).

== History ==
The idea of a pipeline to transport gas from the North West Shelf to the south-west of Western Australia had its origins in 1975, following the discovery of large offshore reserves by WAPET and Woodside Petroleum. Around this time, the State Energy Commission of Western Australia (SECWA) reviewed the state's future gas requirements in conjunction with the partners in the North West Shelf consortium. The developers of the North West Shelf were in the preliminary stages of planning a system of production facilities based on the Rankin and Goodwyn fields (located about 130 kilometres (81 mi) off the coast of Dampier), linked to a liquefied natural gas processing plant and a domestic gas plant situated at Withnell Bay. As the state government had access to more attractive interest rates than the commercial venturers, the state agreed to fund and build (through SECWA) a 1,540-kilometre (960 mi) gas pipeline to transport the output from the domestic gas plant. In addition, SECWA entered into long term (20-year) take-or-pay contracts with the North West Shelf partners, in which SECWA agreed to pay for fixed volumes of gas which exceeded the market demand for gas in the south west.

Engineering design commenced in 1979. and the pipeline was constructed between 1983 and 1984, with the extension south to Bunbury commissioned in 1985. Construction involved the welding of 127,000 sections of 12-metre (39 ft) pipe. Gas first flowed into the pipe on 16 August 1984. Following the disaggregation of SECWA in 1995, the pipeline came under the ownership and control of the government's gas utility, AlintaGas. As part of a government policy of privatisation, Alinta sold the pipeline in 1998 to Epic Energy, a consortium of two US pipeline companies (along with three Australian institutional shareholders) at a price of A$2.407 billion, equivalent to A$4.544 billion in 2022.

Epic Energy owned and operated the pipeline for six years, eventually selling the pipeline in October 2004 to Dampier Bunbury Pipeline (DBP) Ltd, which is the trading name of the DBNGP group of companies. DBP had two institutional shareholders: D.U.E.T. (Diversified Utilities and Energy Trusts) (80%) and Alcoa (20%) up until 2017.

The DBNGP is currently owned and operated by Dampier Bunbury Pipeline (DBP), part of the Australian Gas Infrastructure Group (AGIG), Australian Gas Infrastructure Group is owned by various consortia of Hong Kong-based entities listed on the Hong Kong Stock Exchange. The consortia include CK Asset Holdings (CKA), CK Infrastructure Holdings (CKI), Power Assets Holdings (PAH) and CK Hutchison Holdings (CKH).

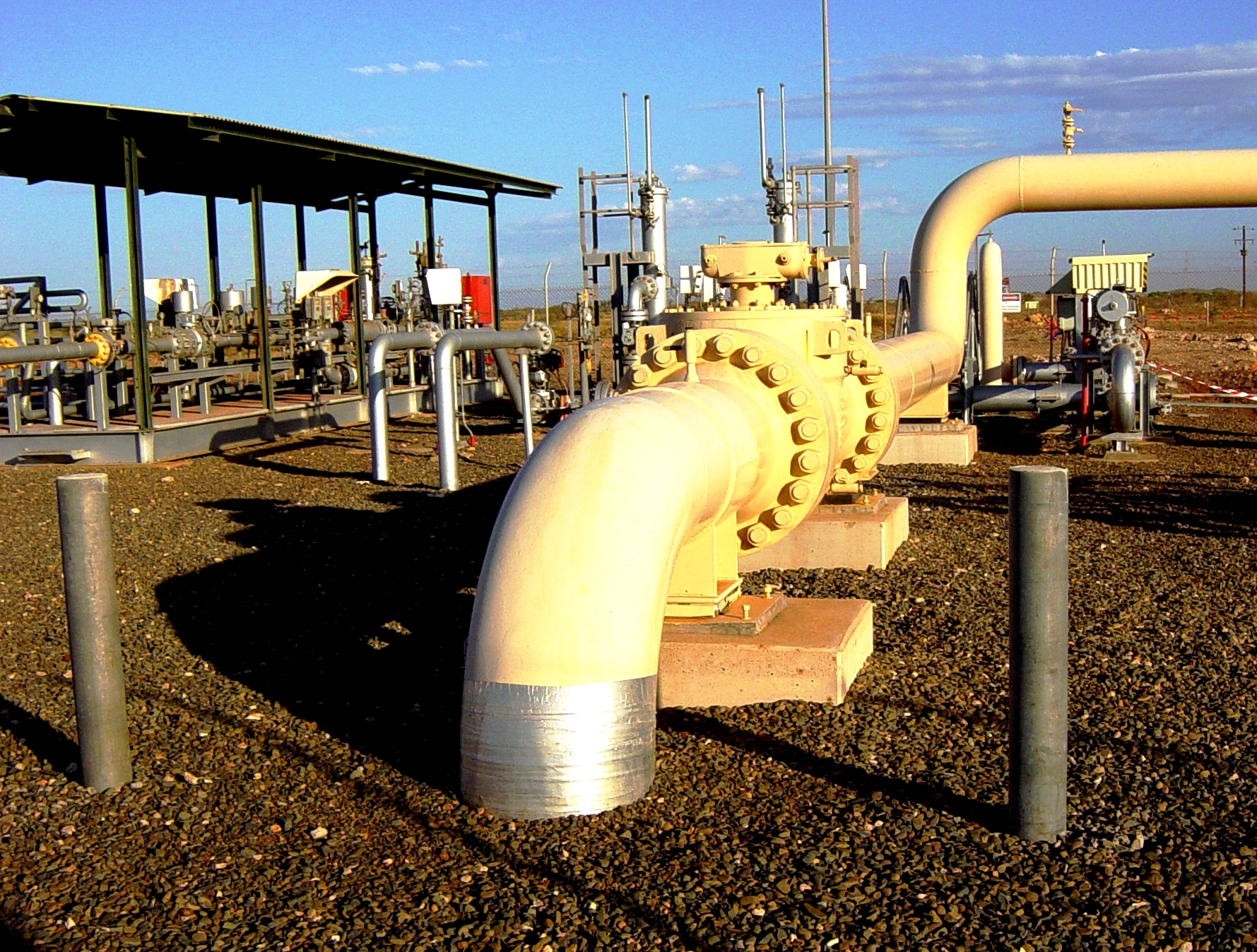
View of the Dampier to Bunbury Natural Gas Pipeline at Main Line Valve No. 7 near Dampier.

== Throughput ==
When first constructed, the capacity of the system was 360 terajoules per day (1,200 kWh/s). A $150-million enhancement carried out in 1991 increased the capacity to 450 terajoules per day (1,400 kWh/s). The current capacity of the pipeline is approximately 785 terajoules per day (2,520 kWh/s). The pipeline is currently undergoing a series of significant expansions in its capacity which are intended to increase the maximum throughput of the pipeline to 895 terajoules per day (2,880 kWh/s). The expansion project consists of two types of upgrade. Several of the pipeline's compressor stations will be upgraded with higher capacity gas turbines, thus increasing the actual pressure of the gas inside the line. In addition, the expansion involves a process of 'looping' the pipeline. This is the installation of additional lengths of pipe alongside, and connected to, the existing pipeline. The effect of looping is to provide additional capacity at critical sections of the main trunkline, thus increasing the total possible throughput.

== DBP expansion projects ==
The DBNGP underwent a range of expansion projects under previous ownership structures. However, the most advanced have been undertaken by the current owners, who have invested in three major expansion projects since acquiring the asset, these projects are known as Stage 4 (constructed by Nacap Australia Pty Ltd), Stage 5A (constructed by Saipem) and the most recent, Stage 5B (as constructed by McConnell Dowell).

These three projects were carried out in direct response to increasing demand for gas in the south-west of Western Australia. The owners worked closely with major gas customers to deliver the capacity required within the timeframes needed to support those customers' projects. Increasing the gas haulage capacity of the pipeline was crucial in supporting economic growth in Western Australia.

The expansions were designed and built to meet DBP's contractual obligations. As a result of the expansions, 83% of the pipeline has now been duplicated – effectively creating a second pipeline. This was achieved via a process known as looping. Looping involves installation of pipe lengths parallel to the existing asset. The expansion projects also required upgrade works on the pipeline's compressor stations, control and communications systems and metering equipment.

The three expansions have increased the capacity of the pipeline by over 300 terajoules per day (960 kWh/s) as well as enhancing the reliability of the pipeline and improving security of supply for customers. The Stage 4, Stage 5A and Stage 5B expansion projects have seen the pipeline owners inject $1.7 billion into the DBNGP. In the next 12 months, the final closure and completion of the Defects Liability Period will expire. The works include:

- flow testing of all station pipework at design flows;
- the completion of the Fortescue River Crossing;
- modifications and completion of traffic and flow management at all stations;
- ongoing environment restoration and subsidence repairs of the Right of Way.

== Pipeline corridor ==
The pipeline's corridor runs near and crosses the North West Coastal Highway to near the Yannrie river where it passes inland, east of the Kennedy Range National Park crossing the Murchison River near Mulla Mulla flat, moving south to cross the Midlands Road east of Dongara.

== See also ==
- List of natural gas pipelines in Western Australia
- Varanus Island
- Petroleum industry in Western Australia
