= 1969 Santa Barbara oil spill =

Environmental disaster in California, United States

Santa Barbara Oil Spill
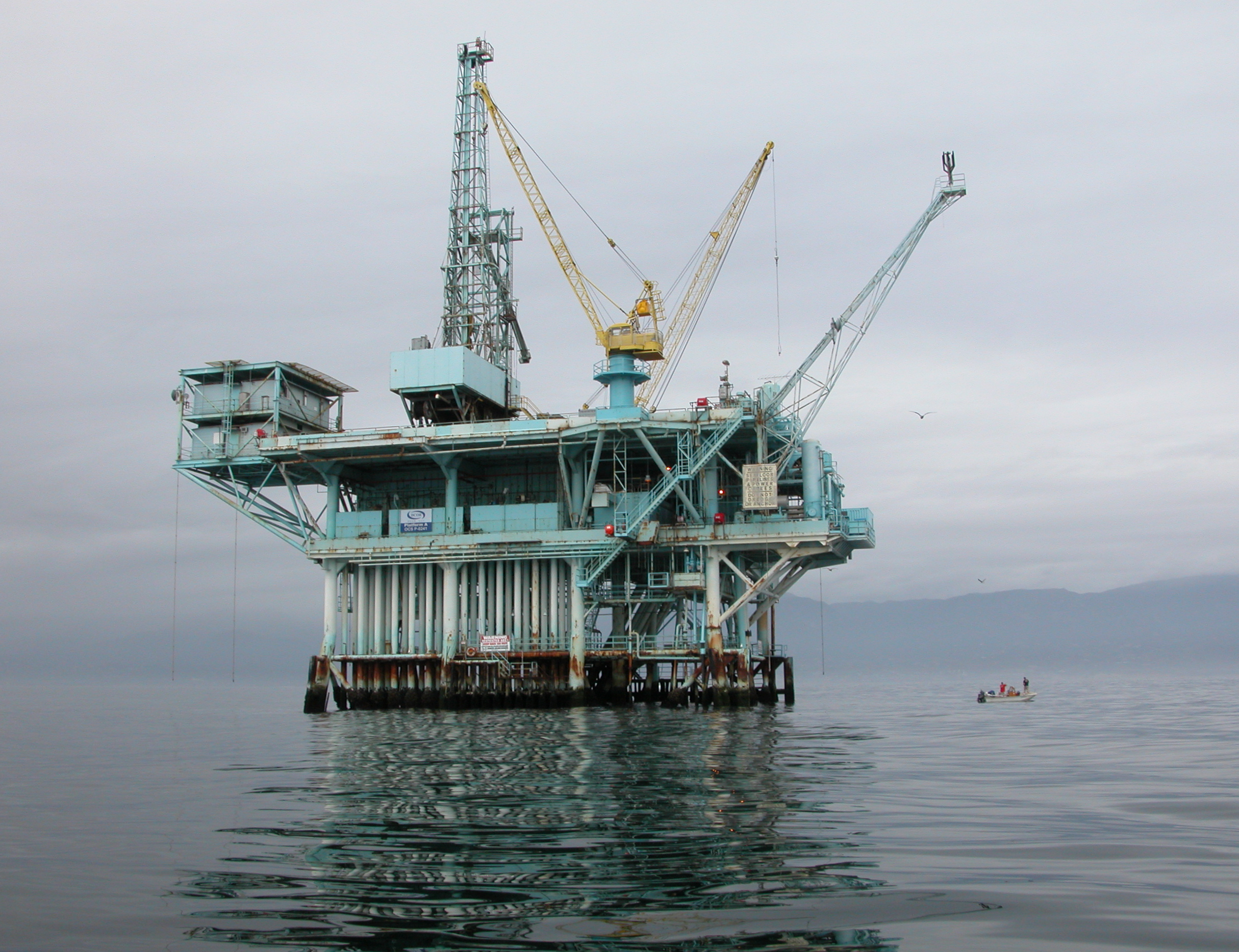
- Platform A in 2006
- Interactive map of Santa Barbara Oil Spill
- Location: Pacific Ocean; Santa Barbara Channel
- Coordinates: 34°19′54″N 119°36′47″W
- Date: Main spill January 28 to February 7, 1969; gradually tapering off by April

Cause
- Cause: Well blowout during drilling from offshore oil platform
- Operator: Union Oil

Spill characteristics
- Volume: 80,000 to 100,000 barrels (13,000 to 16,000 m^{3}; 3,400,000 to 4,200,000 US gal)
- Shoreline impacted: Southern California: Pismo Beach to the Mexican border, but concentrated near Santa Barbara

The Santa Barbara oil spill occurred in January and February 1969 in the Santa Barbara Channel, near the city of Santa Barbara in Southern California. It was the largest oil spill in United States waters at the time. It remains the largest oil spill to have occurred in the waters off California.

The source of the spill was the January 28, 1969, blow-out on Union Oil's Platform A, located 6 miles (10 km; 5 nmi) from the coast in the Dos Cuadras Offshore Oil Field. Within a ten-day period, an estimated 80,000 to 100,000 barrels (13,000 to 16,000 m^{3}; 3,400,000 to 4,200,000 US gal) of crude oil spilled into the Channel and onto the beaches of Santa Barbara County in Southern California, fouling the coastline from Goleta to Ventura as well as the northern shores of the four northern Channel Islands. The spill had a significant impact on marine life in the Channel, killing an estimated 3,500 seabirds, as well as marine animals such as dolphins, elephant seals, and sea lions. The public outrage engendered by the spill, which received prominent media coverage in the United States, resulted in numerous pieces of environmental legislation within the next several years, legislation that forms the legal and regulatory framework for the modern environmental movement in the U.S.

== Background ==
Because of the abundance of oil in the thick sedimentary rock layers beneath the Santa Barbara Channel, the region has been an attractive resource for the petroleum industry for more than a hundred years. The southern coast of Santa Barbara County was the location of the world's first offshore oil drilling, which took place from piers at the Summerland Oil Field in 1896, just 6 miles (10 km) from the spill site. An economic boom accompanied the development of the Summerland field, which transformed the spiritualist community of Summerland into an oil town in just a few years.

Oil development in the Channel and adjacent coastline was controversial even from the earliest days, as by the late 19th century the city was beginning to establish itself as a health resort and tourist destination with dramatic natural scenery, unspoiled beaches, and a perfect climate. In the late 1890s, when the Summerland field began to expand much closer to the city of Santa Barbara, a crowd of midnight vigilantes headed by local newspaper publisher Reginald Fernald tore down one of the more unsightly rigs erected on Miramar Beach itself (in 2010 the location of a luxury hotel). In 1927, the discovery of oil west of Santa Barbara led to the development of Ellwood Oil Field. This caused the city to be bracketed on east and west with oil fields, the new one a bonanza and the depleted Summerland field a largely abandoned, blighted waste. In 1929, the Mesa Oil Field was discovered within the city itself, on the blufftop adjacent to present-day Santa Barbara City College. Residential construction in the vicinity of the Mesa field halted, as oil presented easier and faster money to the land developers. Oil derricks sprouted on the hilltop within easy view of the harbor, on narrow town lots intended originally for houses. While local protests were vocal, they failed to shut down the oil development, as there was a city ordinance at the time specifically allowing drilling on the Mesa. The oil derricks only went away when production on the small Mesa field abruptly declined and ended in the late 1930s.

Improved technology gradually allowed drilling farther and farther from shore, and by the middle of the 20th century drilling was being carried out near Seal Beach, Long Beach, and in other areas on the Southern California coast from human-made islands built in shallow water close to shore. Nearer to the site of the oil spill, the first drilling island was built in 1958 by Richfield Oil Company. Named Richfield Island, now Rincon Island, it was constructed in 45 feet (14 m) of water near Punta Gorda, between Carpinteria and Ventura, to exploit the offshore portion of the Rincon Oil Field; this island, now owned by Greka Energy, remains in active production.

In the Santa Barbara Channel, geologists realized that the anticlinal trend which held the extremely productive Rincon and Ventura Oil Fields did not end at the shoreline, but extended underneath the Channel. Prospectors for oil sought ways to drill in deeper water. Seismic testing under the Channel began shortly after the Second World War, in an attempt to locate the suspected petroleum reservoirs deep underneath the ocean floor. The testing was noisy and disruptive; explosions rattled windows, cracked plaster, and filled the beaches with dead fish; local citizens as well as the Santa Barbara News-Press vocally opposed the practice, which continued nonetheless, but after a delay and under tighter controls. Yet the testing had revealed what the oil company geologists had suspected, and the population feared: the probable presence of sizeable exploitable petroleum reservoirs in relatively shallow water, approximately 200 feet (60 m) deep, within reach of developing ocean-drilling technology.

A series of legal and legislative actions, however, delayed actual oil platform construction and drilling until the mid-1960s, as the Federal and State governments fought for ownership of submerged lands. Congress passed the Submerged Lands Act in 1953, which granted to the states all lands within 3 nautical miles (6 km) of shore, known as the tidelands. After two more years of wrangling with state legislature, Santa Barbara arrived at a compromise with the oil companies, creating a no-drilling zone in the Channel 16 miles (26 km) long and 3 miles (5 km) wide adjacent to the city of Santa Barbara. However, several major oil fields were found within state waters on either side of this zone, and the State granted leases in these fields beginning in 1957. Development of these resources commenced, with the first offshore oil platform – Hazel – being built in 1957. Platform Hilda, adjacent to Hazel, was erected in 1960. Both platforms tapped into the Summerland Offshore Oil Field, and were easily visible from Santa Barbara on a clear day. Platform Holly, in the offshore portion of the Ellwood Oil Field about 15 miles (24 km) west of Santa Barbara, was emplaced in 1965.

Development of leases in the federal waters was next. As the technology became available, and after the seismic surveys of the Channel had revealed that the oil was probably there, the federal government put the portions of the Santa Barbara Channel outside of the 3 miles (5 km) tidelands limit up for lease. This was possible because a 1965 Supreme Court decision finally settled the competing claims on the submerged lands outside of 3 miles (5 km) limit, giving them to the federal government. The first lease sale took place on December 15, 1966, after a notice of the impending sale in the Federal Register went unnoticed by local officials. A consortium of oil companies, including Phillips, Continental, and Cities Service Oil Company, was awarded the first lease after paying over $21 million for the rights to drill on approximately 3 square miles (8 km^{2}) of ocean floor in the Carpinteria Offshore Oil Field. The rig the three companies emplaced – Platform Hogan – was the first oil platform offshore of California in Federal waters. It became operational on September 1, 1967. On February 6, 1968, a total of 72 leases went up for bid. A partnership between Union Oil, Gulf Oil, Texaco, and Mobil acquired the rights to Lease 241 in the Dos Cuadras Offshore Oil Field. Their first rig on that lease, Platform A, went into position on September 14, 1968, and commenced drilling.

Local hostility to the oil industry had been growing during the period from 1966 to 1968, despite assurances from the oil industry and the federal government that the wells would be installed and operated safely. On June 7, 1968, 2,000 US gallons (8 m^{3}) of crude oil spilled into the sea from Phillips' new Platform Hogan, in spite of the oil company's assurances that such a thing would not happen, and the assurances of Stewart L. Udall, the Secretary of the Department of the Interior; and in November, a local ballot referendum was successful in preventing the construction of an onshore oil facility at Carpinteria.

== Oil spill ==
=== Blowout on Platform A ===
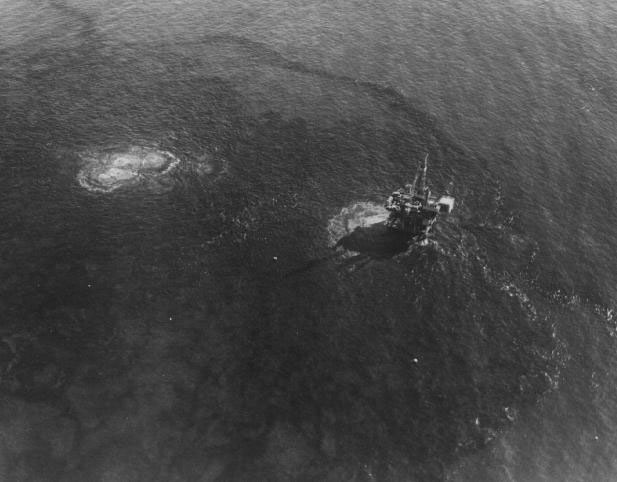
Aerial view of the spill from Platform A. After the well was plugged on the rig, the high-pressure oil and gas left the well bore, ripping through the floor of the ocean itself 200 feet (61 m) down; this is causing the surface disturbance to the left of the rig.

Platform A was positioned in 188 feet (57 m) of water, 5.8 miles (9 km) from the shore at Summerland. It had 57 slots for wells from which it could drill directionally into the oil reservoir from different angles. At the time of the spill, it was one of twelve platforms already in the waters off California, and one of two operated by Union Oil in the Dos Cuadras field. Four oil wells had already been drilled from the new platform, though not yet put in production. Work on the fifth was under way.

On the morning of January 28, 1969, workers drilling the fifth well, A-21, reached its final depth of 3,479 feet (1,060 m), attaining this depth in only 14 days. Of this depth, only the top 239 feet (73 m) had been fitted with a steel conductor casing; the rest was to be fitted with one once the drill bit was out. After the workers pulled the drill bit out, with some difficulty, an enormous spout of oil, gas, and drilling mud burst into the air into the rig, splattering the men with filth; several of them attempted to screw a blowout-preventer onto the pipe, but against a pressure of over 1,000 pounds per square inch (7 MPa), this proved to be impossible; all workers except for those engaged in the plugging attempt were evacuated, due to the danger of explosion from the abundant natural gas blown from the hole; finally, the workers tried the method of last resort, dropping the remaining drill pipe – almost 0.5 miles (800 m) long – into the hole, and then crushing the top of the well pipe from the sides with a pair of "blind rams", enormous steel blocks slamming together with force sufficient to stop anything from escaping from the well. It took thirteen minutes from the time of the initial blowout to the time the blind rams were activated. Only then did the workers both on the rig and in boats nearby notice the increase in bubbling at the ocean surface hundreds of feet from the rig. Plugging the well at the top had failed to stop the blowout, which was now tearing through the ocean floor in several places.

Normally, an offshore well would have been built with at least 300 feet (91 m) of conductor casing, as required by federal regulations at the time, as well as approximately 870 feet (270 m) of a secondary, inner steel tube known as the surface casing. Both of these protective casings were intended to prevent blowout of high-pressure gas out of the sides of the well bore into and through adjacent geologic formations. At Well A-21, this is exactly what happened. Since there was no casing below 238 feet (73 m) sufficient to stop the immense pressure of gas, once the well was plugged at the rig, the oil and gas left the well bore, ripping right through the soft sandstones on the floor of the Santa Barbara Channel, and spewing a huge amount of oil and gas all the way to the water surface where a thick bubbling oil slick quickly began to grow and spread.

=== Expansion of the spill ===
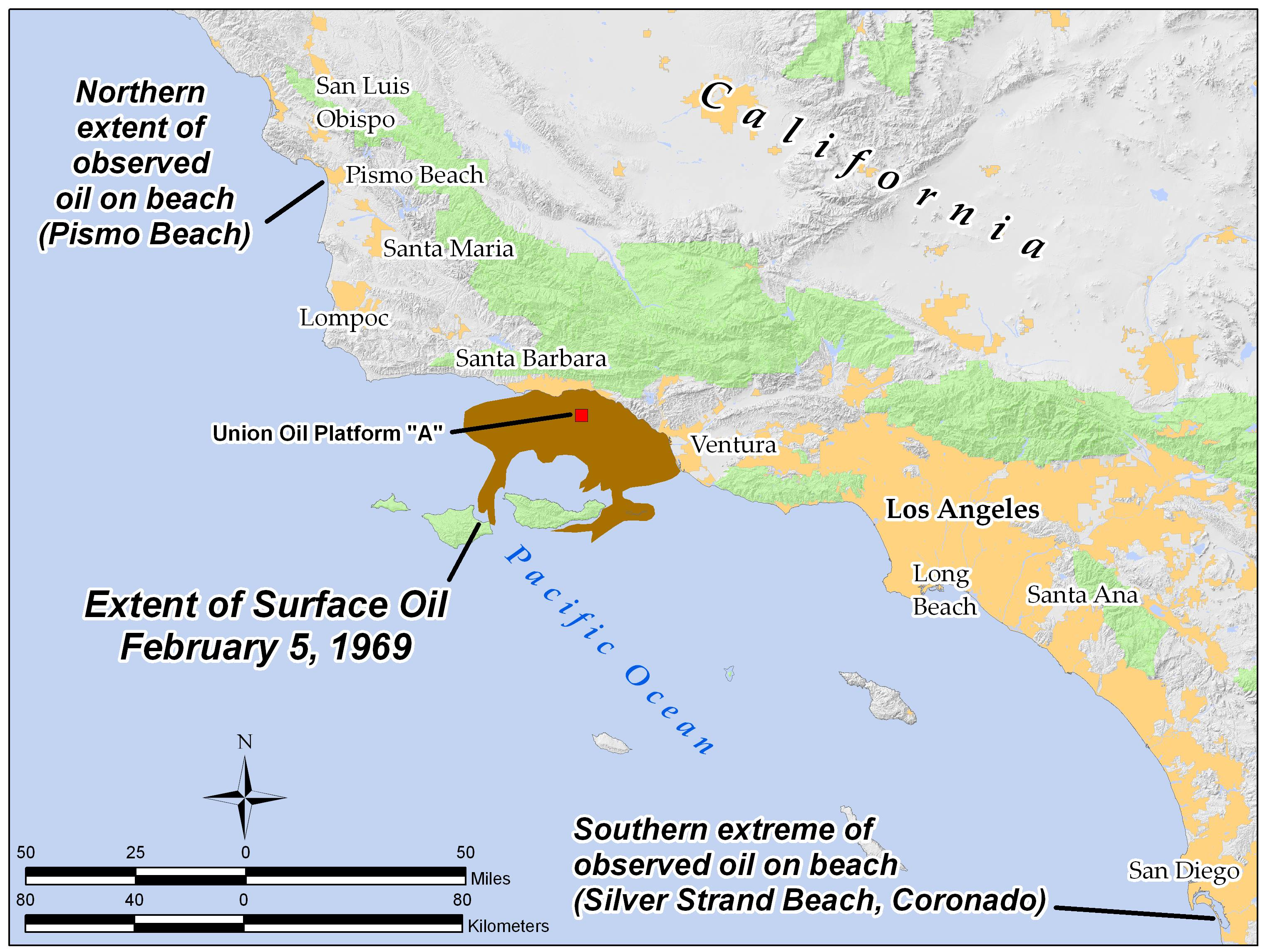
Extent of the spill on the ocean surface on February 5, 1969, showing the northward and southward extremes of observed oil during the year.

The disturbances on the surface of the ocean, which began to appear only 14 minutes after the blowout, expanded during the next 24 hours. The largest was a dramatic boil-up about 800 feet (200 m) east of the platform; another smaller disturbance broke the ocean surface about 300 feet (100 m) west of the platform, and several smaller areas of bubbling could be observed around the platform itself. Even after the well was further plugged at the platform with drilling mud during the next week, these continued to boil up. Investigators later determined that oil and gas was emerging uncontrolled through five separate rips on the ocean floor.

The first announcement of the potential disaster was made by Don Craggs, Union Oil's regional superintendent to Lieutenant George Brown of the U.S. Coast Guard, about two and a half hours after the blowout. He told Brown that a well had blown out but no oil was escaping. Craggs declined an offer for help, suggesting that the situation was under control.

The seriousness of the spill became evident the next morning, as a Coast Guard helicopter took Brown along with a State Fish and Game warden out over the platform, where they were able to see a central slick extending for several miles east, west, and south of the platform. They estimated a total of 75 square miles (200 km^{2}) covered by oil at 8 a.m., less than 24 hours after the blowout. An anonymous worker on the drill rig telephoned the Santa Barbara News-Press regarding the blowout, and the newspaper immediately obtained confirmation from Union Oil's headquarters in Los Angeles. The story was out. Union Oil Vice President, John Fraser, assured reporters and local officials that the spill was small, with a diameter of 1,000 to 3,000 feet (300 to 900 m), and that the well would be quickly controlled; additionally, he gave an estimated spill rate of 5,000 US gallons (19 m^{3}) per day. Later estimates put the spill rate at 24,000 US gallons (91 m^{3}) per day, releasing about 210,000 US gallons (790 m^{3}) in the first days.

Santa Barbara was experiencing a stormy winter, with a large flood event having occurred on January 25, just three days before the blowout. Enormous amounts of fresh water were still running offshore from local streams, flowing south and southwest in the vicinity of the rig. Combined with the prevailing north-northwesterly winds typical of the area between storm systems, this pushed the expanding oil slick away from the shore, and it seemed for several days that the beaches of Santa Barbara would be spared. However, another huge storm system affected the region on February 4, with winds moving around the compass clockwise from southeast to west; this pushed the oil slick north into Santa Barbara harbor and onto all the beaches of southern Santa Barbara County and northwestern Ventura County. Booms had been placed around the harbor and beaches, but the surf was heavy in the storm, and the oil was up to 8 inches (200 mm) deep at the boom by late afternoon on the 4th. That evening the booms failed completely, breaking under the assault of the storm and by the morning the entire harbor, containing around 800 boats, was several inches deep in fresh crude oil, and all the boats were blackened. Residents were evacuated, due to the risk of explosion from the abundant hydrocarbon vapors, and both the oil contractors and the Coast Guard began using chemical dispersants on the oil near the shore.

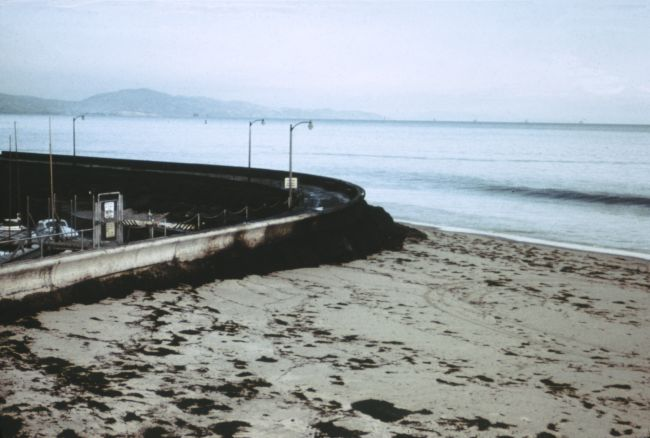
Oil piled up at the seawall near the Santa Barbara Harbor. Note the blackness of the incoming wave; the water has a thick layer of oil on top.

On the morning of February 5, residents of the entire populated zone on the coast awoke to the stink of crude oil, and the sight of blackened beaches, sprinkled with dead and dying birds. The sound of the waves breaking was eerily muted by the thick layer of oil, which accumulated on shore in some places to a depth of 6 inches (150 mm). Residents visited the beaches and looked on in horror. Robert Olney Easton recounts a beachside encounter on February 5 between Dick Smith and a high school student, Kathy Morales:

After high school let out, Kathy Morales had gone down to the sandbar at the end of the breakwater. It was not the sandbar she had known. When Dick Smith of the News-Press found her she was crying. Smith saw the reason. Nearby on the sand a dying loon was in convulsions, covered from head to foot with black, sticky crude oil. Tears ran down the girl's face as she watched the loon die. "You want to talk about The Establishment?" she asked. "This is my life — out here. I come out here all the time to watch the sea and the birds and animals. I can't think of coming down here for a stroll again. I can't think of some day bringing my children here to watch and to play. I don't know now," she said, with the tears streaming down her cheeks, "if it will ever be the same again, and no one can tell me."

=== Media coverage and public response ===
Media coverage of the spill was intense from the moment the oil reached the shore. The spill was the major headline in many morning newspapers on February 5, also receiving wide coverage on radio and television. The same morning, a U.S. Senate subcommittee interviewed local officials as well as Fred Hartley, president of Union Oil, on the disaster in the making. Three major television networks were there along with over 50 reporters, the largest media turnout for any Senate subcommittee meeting since the Committee on Foreign Relations discussed the Vietnam War. During the meeting, local officials made their case that the Federal government had a conflict of interest, in that they were making money from the same drilling they were mandated to oversee and regulate. Hartley defended Union's record and denied that the event was a disaster: "I don't like to call it a disaster, because there has been no loss of human life. I am amazed at the publicity for the loss of a few birds." Most controversially, offshore drilling operations – all of which were suspended immediately on February 3, by direct request of the Walter Hickel Secretary of the Interior, pending a "complete reevaluation and reassessment of the situation" – had resumed after just a break of several hours, just long enough for a closed-door meeting between oil company representatives and Department of the Interior officials. Local officials, not invited to the meeting, were furious that "complete reevaluation and reassessment" could have occurred in such a short time, and in a meeting that excluded them; the fierce exchange was covered on national television, along with grim footage of the thousands of dying birds on the tarred beaches of Santa Barbara, and the spontaneous efforts of hundreds of civilian volunteers to pile straw on the oil, scrub rocks with detergent, and struggle to save a few of the less-oiled birds.

As the nation watched the spill on the television news, the hastily assembled volunteer crews gathered to clean up the oil in any way they could. They distributed enormous piles of straw, spreading them over oiled sections of the beach, and then raking them into disposable piles. Other workers used steam to clean the oil off boulders, in the process boiling rock-clinging marine life such as mussels. Airplanes dropped chemical dispersants to help break up the oil, even though those chemicals were themselves toxic to wildlife. Bulldozers pushed contaminated sand into piles for offsite disposal. Civilian volunteers rescued many tarred birds by taking them to numerous rescue facilities put together during the first days, but even after rescue the survival rate for birds was only around 12 percent. The first dead dolphin was found, its blowhole clogged by oil. Offshore, ships skimmed oil from the ocean surface into holding tanks, but as fast as they skimmed it up, new oil rolled in from the south.

Late on February 6, the day after the spill washed ashore, President Richard Nixon announced a complete cessation of drilling, as well as production, in federal waters of the Santa Barbara Channel, with the solitary exception of the relief well being drilled to intersect the blown-out borehole. Still the spill continued to spew from fissures in the ocean floor, undiminished, and by noon on February 7 a $1.3 billion class action lawsuit had been filed against Union Oil and their partners on Platform A. On the platform itself, workers labored continuously to try to kill the well. They made their final attempt that afternoon and evening, pumping 13,000 barrels (2,100 m^{3}) of the heaviest available drilling mud into the well at pressures of thousands of pounds per square inch. They had almost exhausted their supply of mud when the oil and gas boiling up from the ocean began to slow down, and by 8:00 p.m. it had stopped. Delivering the coup de grâce, the crews rammed over 1,000 sacks of concrete into the well. Well A-21 would leak no more. Approximately 2 million US gallons (8,000 m^{3}) of oil had already spilled into the ocean at this point; but there was more to come.

=== Continued spill ===
Five days after workers killed Well A-21, on February 12, a Commercial Fisheries research vessel studying dissolved oxygen levels in the water made an unpleasant discovery: from the ocean floor itself, three large new boils of gas and oil were emerging from ruptures each about ten yards across, and a large slick was again accumulating on the ocean surface. Once again, an anonymous telephone call from a rig worker alerted the Santa Barbara News-Press to the existence of a new oil spill from the supposedly killed well – only now the oil was coming from the ocean floor, seeping from somewhere other than the filled borehole. Community outrage reached new heights: particularly infuriating was that it was private citizens that had again discovered the problem, and the oil company only acknowledged its existence later.

This time the problem needed to be solved on the ocean bottom. Union put a large steel cap over much of the leaking area, but leaks continued from other nearby locations. The company estimated the leak rate at up to 4,000 US gallons (15 m^{3}) per day. The federal government approved reopening some wells to attempt to intercept oil underneath the sea floor, and even reopening A-21; neither method worked. The next measure involved pumping oil at a maximum rate from all five wells on Platform A, on the theory that such action would reduce reservoir pressure and thus the leak rate, but this only increased the rate at which oil spewed from the rents in the ocean floor. Meanwhile, the cleanup progressed with setbacks, as huge waves of newly spilled oil fouled partially cleaned beaches, and oil from the spill reached locations as distant as Pismo Beach in San Luis Obispo County, Catalina Island, and Silver Strand Beach in San Diego. Despite attempts by Union to cement the cracks in the ocean floor, leaks continued, with a leak near one of the platform legs predominating on February 23. By the end of the month, its flow had reduced, but oil was still seeping, at a diminishing rate, from cracks both east and west of the platform. Leaking continued at a rate of about 30 barrels (4.8 m^{3}) a day, diminishing but never completely stopping, reaching a stable leak rate of between 5 and 10 barrels (0.79 and 1.59 m^{3}) a day by May and June 1969, a leak rate which persisted at least into 1970. One last spill occurred at Platform A: a release of about 400 barrels (64 m^{3}) between December 15 and 20, 1969, from a pipeline break.

Total cleanup time for most of the beaches was about 45 days after the initial spill, although globs of tar continued to wash ashore due to the high seep rate, and bigger patches came ashore during subsequent spills. Most beaches were open to the public by June 1, although some of the rocky areas on the shore were not cleaned until around August 15. Yet oil continued to pool and wash up on shore; on August 26, the harbor was so full of oil that once again it had to be closed, with cleanup crews spreading straw from boats to bunch the oil up again, just as they had six months before. Indeed, oil from the spill persisted in the ocean into 1970, with large areas of crude still being observed. Since the spill occurred during the stormy season, when beach sand is at its lowest levels (it replenishes during the course of a normal spring and summer), one fear was that regions of oily sand would be revealed during the following winter; however this did not happen.

=== President Nixon's visit; further oil development ===
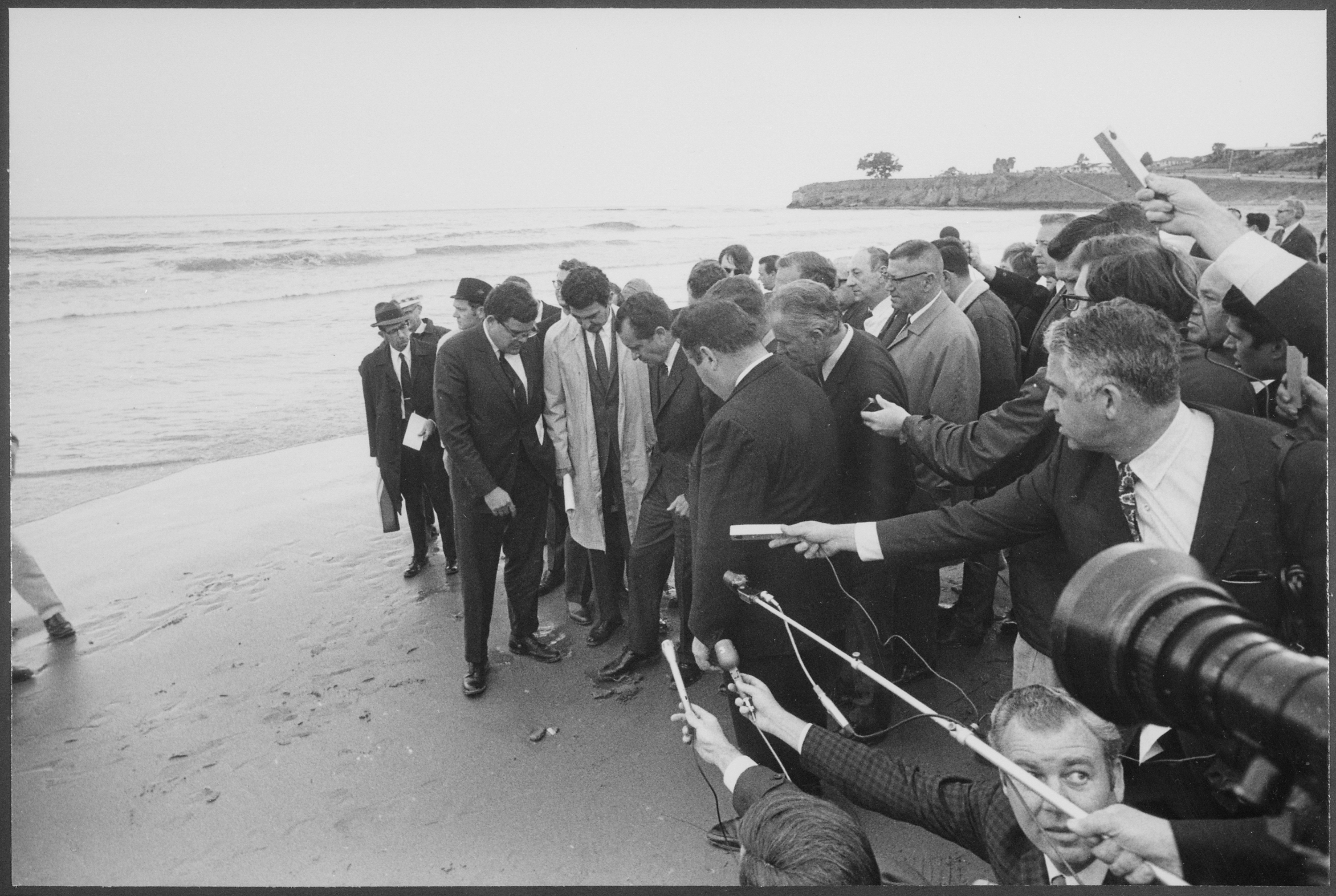
President Richard Nixon visiting the beach on March 21, 1969

On March 21, President Nixon came to Santa Barbara to see the spill and cleanup efforts for himself. Arriving at the Point Mugu Naval Air Station, he then took a helicopter tour of the Santa Barbara Channel, Platform A, and the polluted, partially cleaned beaches. He landed in Santa Barbara and spoke to residents, promising to improve his handling of environmental problems, telling the crowd, "...the Santa Barbara incident has frankly touched the conscience of the American people." He also mentioned that he would consider a halt to all offshore drilling, and told assembled reporters that the Department of the Interior had expanded the former buffer zone in the Channel by an additional 34,000 acres (140 km^{2}), and was converting the previous buffer zone into a permanent ecological preserve. However, on April 1, the ban was lifted, and drilling allowed to proceed on five leases in the channel, under stricter oversight. Anger of local residents increased after this reversal.

After a series of unsuccessful struggles in the courts to prevent further oil development in the Channel, the Department of the Interior gave the green light on August 15 to Sun Oil to construct their Platform Hillhouse adjacent to Union's Platform A. Protestors harassed the convoy bringing the platform all the way from the Oakland shipyard, down the coast, and into the Channel. Get Oil Out! (GOO!) staged a "fish-in" with boats and even helicopters fishing (unsuccessfully) at the planned platform site, one mile east of Platform A. They refused to move until the Supreme Court responded to their appeal. Then the crane lifting the platform from the barge bungled the platform transfer, and Platform Hillhouse flopped over in the water, legs-up, about two hundred yards from the fleet of protestors. While this was going on, the Supreme Court denied the appeal, allowing Sun Oil to proceed, even though their platform floated upside down – an absurd and discomforting sight to local residents hopeful that the spill might have made oil industry accidents less likely. By November 26, Hillhouse was installed correctly, and Platform C, the final platform to be built of the four in the Dos Cuadras field, went up in 1977.

== Consequences ==
=== Environmental effects ===
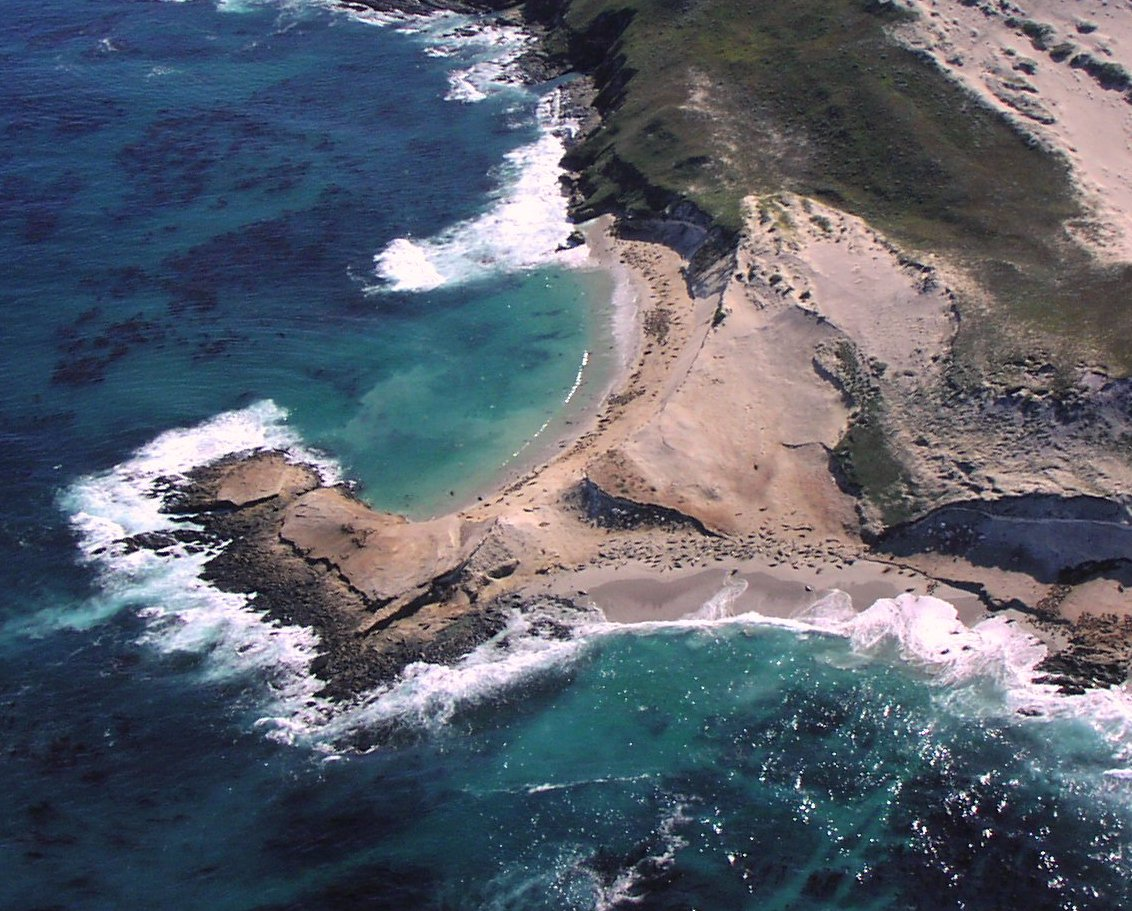
Colony of marine mammals (elephant seals, sea lions) at western tip of San Miguel Island, 40 years after the spill. This colony was affected by the oil spill; many of these animals were oiled, and an unknown number died.

The environmental effects of the spill were immediate and dramatic. At least 3,686 birds died. Some marine mammals, such as sea lions and elephant seals, died although the number of deaths is unknown. Effects on other organisms varied. Fish populations seemed to be unaffected in the long term, although data from 1969 showed a drop in counts of several species. Authors of a Marine Fisheries Review study were unwilling to make a firm link with the oil spill, since other variables such as water temperature and a subsequent El Niño year could not be ruled out as causes of the divergence. Intertidal organisms such as barnacles (Chthamalus fissus) were killed in large numbers, with mortality in some areas as high as 80 to 90 percent.

Overall, long-term environmental effects of the spill seemed to be minimal. In a "no strings attached" study funded by the Western Oil and Gas Association, through the Allan Hancock Foundation at the University of Southern California, the authors suggested several hypotheses for the lack of environmental damage to biologic resources in the Channel aside from pelagic birds and intertidal organisms. First, creatures there may have evolved a tolerance to oil in the water due to the presence of natural seeps in the vicinity for at least tens of thousands of years; the area around Coal Oil Point has one of the most active natural underwater oil seeps in the world. Second, the abundance of oil-eating bacteria in the water may be greater because of that routine presence of oil in the water. Third, the spill happened between two large Pacific storms; the storms broke up the oil, scattering it more quickly than happens in many other oil spills, and additionally the sediment load in the seawater from freshwater runoff would have been greater, and this assisted the oil in quickly sinking. Fourth, Santa Barbara Channel crude oil is heavy, having API gravity between 10 and 13, and is both minimally soluble in water, and sinks relatively easily. Therefore, fish and other organisms were exposed to the oil for a shorter time than was the case with other oil spills, such as the 1967 Torrey Canyon spill in which the crude was lighter, and emulsified during treatment with massive quantities of toxic dispersants and detergents, causing it to remain in place longer.

Reports that large sea mammals were largely unaffected by the spill were flatly contradicted by a story in Life magazine, published on June 13, 1969. In late May, reporters and photographers from the magazine visited uninhabited San Miguel Island, the westernmost of the Santa Barbara Channel Islands, famous for its colonies of elephant seals and sea lions. The team counted over one hundred dead animals in the stretch of beach they visited, which was still black with oil.

=== Economic effects ===
Economic effects of the spill were most severe during 1969, as all commercial fishing was suspended in the affected area, and tourism suffered a precipitous drop. Most ocean-related industries were affected in some way. Property damage along the shoreline was also considerable, since the storms had washed oil up beyond the normal high-tide line. Both governmental entities and private individuals filed class-action lawsuits against Union Oil to recover damages. These were settled within about five years. The City of Santa Barbara received $4 million in 1974 for damages inflicted. Owners of hotels, beachfront homes, and other facilities damaged by the spill received $6.5 million; the commercial fishing interests received $1.3 million for their losses; and cities, the state, and the County of Santa Barbara settled for $9.5 million in total.

=== Policy consequences ===
While the Santa Barbara oil spill was not the sole event which built the regulatory and legislative superstructure of the modern environmental movement in the United States – some prominent pieces of which include the U.S. Environmental Protection Agency, the National Environmental Policy Act (NEPA), the Clean Water Act, and in California the California Coastal Commission and California Environmental Quality Act (CEQA) – it was one of the most dramatic and visible of the several key events that led up to those changes. Through the 1960s, industrial pollution and its consequences had come more and more to the public attention, commencing with Rachel Carson's 1962 book Silent Spring and including such events as the passage of the Water Quality Act, the campaign to ban DDT, the creation of the National Wilderness Preservation System, the 1967 Torrey Canyon tanker accident which devastated coastal areas in both England and France, and the burning of the Cuyahoga River in downtown Cleveland, Ohio. At the time, the Santa Barbara spill was the largest oil spill ever in U.S. waters, and its occurrence during a fierce battle between local residents and the very oil company responsible for the spill only made the controversy more intense, the battle more public, and the anti-oil cause seem more valid to a wider segment of the populace. In the several years after the spill, more environmental legislation was passed than in any other similar period in U.S. history.

The spill was the first test for the new National Pollution Contingency Plan, signed into law by President Lyndon Johnson in 1968. Officials from the Federal Water Pollution Control Administration, created only in 1965, came to Santa Barbara to oversee not only the cleanup but the effort to plug the well.

Local organizations formed in the aftermath of the spill included Get Oil Out! (GOO), formed on the first day of the disaster, as well as the Environmental Defense Center and the Community Environmental Council. Additionally, Rod Nash (Declaration of Environmental Rights author), Garrett Hardin, environmental lawyer Marc McGinnes and others created the first undergraduate Environmental Studies program of its kind at the University of California at Santa Barbara. A California ballot initiative created the powerful California Coastal Commission, which oversees all activity within the coastal zone (3 nautical miles (6 km) from the shoreline, and inland in a band ranging from several hundred feet in urban areas to several miles in some rural parts of the coastline).

NEPA in particular completely changed the regulatory situation, in that it required that all projects by any federal government agency be scrutinized for their potential adverse environmental impacts prior to approval, including a period for public comment. This included proposals to place new drilling platforms in offshore oil leases.

=== Moratoria and bans on offshore leasing and drilling ===
The California State Lands Commission has not granted any new leases for offshore drilling within its jurisdiction – out to the 3 nautical miles (6 km) limit – since 1969, although existing operations, such as at Platform Holly on the Ellwood field and Rincon Island on the Rincon field, have been allowed to continue. A proposal to slant drill into the state-controlled zone from an existing platform outside of it, on the Tranquillon Ridge, was rejected in 2009 by the State Lands Commission by a 2–1 vote.

The issue of drilling beyond the three-mile limit, in federal waters of the Outer Continental Shelf (OCS), has been more complicated. Production from existing leases has been allowed almost without break since the spill, as well as new drilling from existing platforms within lease boundaries. However, no new leases have been granted in the OCS since 1981. In 1976, leases were sold off the Orange County coast, resulting in the construction of Platforms Edith, Elly, Ellen, and Eureka; in 1979, Platforms Harvest and Hermosa were constructed in federal waters near Point Arguello, and in 1981, the oil fields in that area were further developed with the sale of another pair of leases which now contain platforms Hidalgo and Irene.

In 1981 Congress enacted a moratorium on new offshore oil leasing, with exceptions in the Gulf of Mexico and parts of offshore Alaska, that remained in effect until 2008 when Congress did not renew it.

Leases purchased in the 1960s in some cases were not developed until much later. Even though there was a moratorium on new leases, Exxon installed Platforms Harmony and Heritage in the Santa Barbara Channel in 1989, in over 1,000 feet (300 m) of water, completing development of their Santa Ynez Unit (which includes the Hondo and Pescado Oil Fields). Several federal leases remain undeveloped, including the Gato Canyon Unit southwest of Goleta.

=== Environmental Rights Day ===
Roughly three months before Earth Day, Santa Barbara celebrated Environmental Rights Day on January 28, 1970, the first anniversary of the oil blowout. Here the Declaration of Environmental Rights, created by Rod Nash, was read. The same people who organized this event, led by Marc McGinnes, had been working closely with Congressman Pete McCloskey (R-CA) for the creation of the National Environmental Policy Act. McCloskey, Senator Gaylord Nelson), Denis Hayes, Senator Alan Cranston, Paul Ehrlich, David Brower spoke at the Environmental Rights Day conference and endorsed the Declaration of Environmental Rights. Hayes said this was the first giant crowd he spoke to that "felt passionately, I mean really passionately, about environmental issues," and that he thought then this might be the beginning of a movement.

=== Earth Day ===
The aftermath of the spill inspired then-Sen. Gaylord Nelson of Wisconsin to organize what came to be known as "Earth Day", when he succeeded in amassing some 20 million people to the cause of educating people on issues related to the environment on April 22, 1970, with the help of Denis Hayes, the organizer of the first Earth Day, and U.S. Rep. Pete McCloskey of California.

== Current operations ==
Platform A remains in the Santa Barbara Channel along with its three siblings, Platforms B, C, and Hillhouse, still pumping oil from the largely depleted field. As of 2010, the Dos Cuadras Field has produced 260 million barrels of oil; the Minerals Management Service estimated in 2010 that 11,400,000 barrels (1,810,000 m^{3}) remaining in the field are recoverable with present technology.

The current operator of the drilling platform, along with the other three platforms on the Dos Cuadras field, is the private firm DCOR LLC, of Ventura, California. They acquired Platform A from Plains Exploration & Production in 2005. DCOR is the fourth company to run the platform since Unocal sold its Santa Barbara Channel operations in 1996.

== See also ==
- California Coastal Commission
- List of oil spills
- History of Santa Barbara, California
- Offshore oil and gas in California
- 1971 San Francisco Bay oil spill
- 2015 Refugio State Beach oil spill
- 2021 Orange County oil spill
