= Dinkum Sands =

Island in Alaska, United States

Coordinates: 70°25′24″N 147°45′58″W

- Location within Alaska

Geography
- Location: Beaufort Sea
- Highest elevation: 0 ft (0 m)

Administration
- United States

Dinkum Sands is an uninhabited shoal that frequently breaches the surface of the Beaufort Sea north of Prudhoe Bay, Alaska, between Cross Island and the McClure Islands. Located near the three-mile limit that defines the border between state and federal control of waters offshore of the United States, Dinkum Sands became the subject of a U.S. Supreme Court case when the American and Alaskan governments argued over ownership of potentially valuable offshore oil drilling rights. In United States v. Alaska, the court ruled in part that "Dinkum Sands is not an island constituting part of Alaska's coastline under the Submerged Lands Act".

The area of Dinkum Sands has been the home of the Iñupiat Taġiuġmiut people for thousands of years. In 1919, a mapping expedition by Ernest de Koven Leffingwell did not mark Dinkum Sands as an island but noted shallow water in the area. In late August 1949, a survey by the US Coast and Geodetic Survey photographed an island described as a "new gravel bar" and named it after the survey launch Fair Dinkum. Surveyors placed a navigational marker on Dinkum Sands, but a return visit by the USS Merrick in 1955 failed to find the marker. A 1976 visit by the National Ocean Survey and US Coast Guard failed to find the island.

Three years after that visit, the American and Alaskan governments coordinated a sale of oil and gas leases in the area, but ownership of the area around Dinkum Sands was disputed. To resolve the dispute, federal and state officials visited the site in August 1979 but found no part of the shoal above water. The minimum water depth was about 20 centimetres (7.9 in).

A joint state-federal measuring project was set up to determine whether Dinkum Sands was an island or a shoal, but moving ice, storms, and an explosion/fire prevented accurate long-term analysis. The federal government sued the state of Alaska in the US Supreme Court, and the court appointed a special master to hear evidence during a three-week hearing in 1984. The master, J. Keith Mann, did not present his final report to the Supreme Court until 1995. Two years later, the US Supreme Court upheld Mann's decision.
