= Abutilon Island =

Island in Western Australia

- Location within Western Australia

Geography
- Location: Indian Ocean
- Coordinates: 20°40′05″S 115°34′44″E

Administration
- Australia
- State: Western Australia
- LGA: Shire of Ashburton

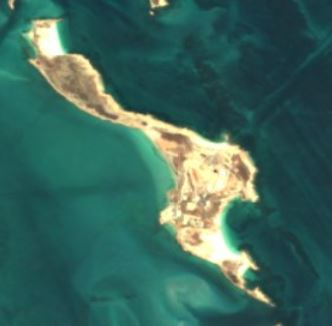

Abutilon Island is located approximately 120 kilometres (75 mi) off the coast from Onslow in the Pilbara region of Western Australia.

== Description ==
The island is part of the Lowendal Islands archipelago; Abutilon is located just south of Varanus Island and approximately 12 kilometres (7 mi) east of the much larger Barrow Island.

The island has an area of 27 hectares (67 acres) and is made up of raised limestone rocks with sparse vegetation.

The island is part of the Lowendal Islands Nature Reserve, which was established in 1976 and has a size of 179 hectares (440 acres).

== Fauna ==
The archipelago is home to the hawksbill turtle, the flatback turtle and the green turtle although none are known to nest on Abutilon.

Birds found on the island include threatened species like the wedge-tailed shearwater, the bridled tern, the crested tern and the lesser crested tern.

== See also ==
- List of islands of Western Australia
