= List of natural gas pipelines in Western Australia =

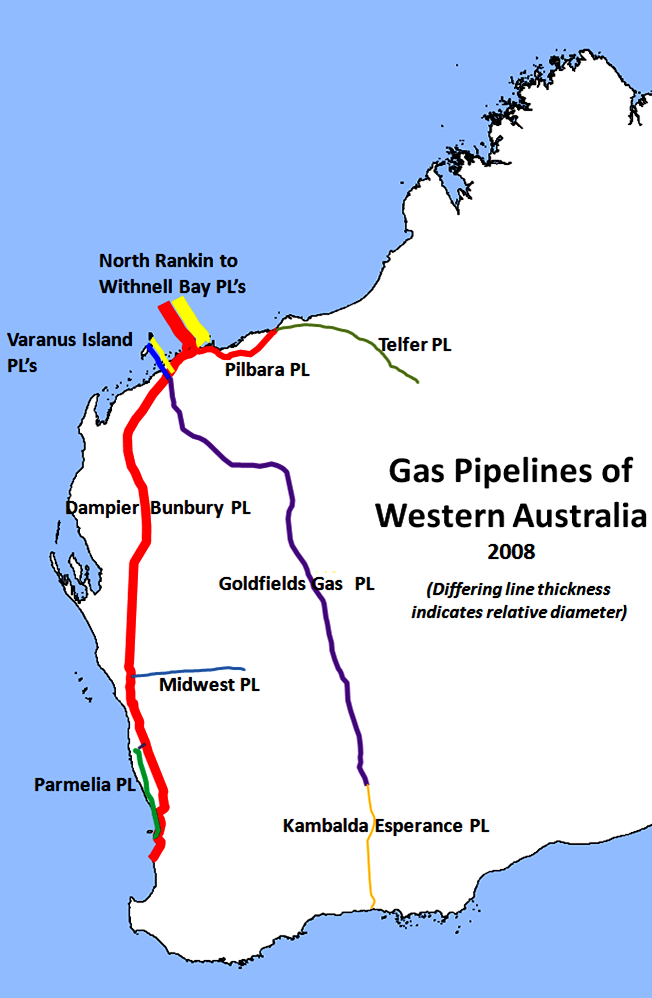

This is a list of the major natural gas pipelines operating within Western Australia.

== Onshore pipelines ==
Name (year commissioned)	Owner/operator	Length	Maximum diameter	From/to	Licence number
Dampier to Bunbury Natural Gas Pipeline (1984)	Dampier Bunbury Pipeline	1,530 km	660 mm	Dampier to Bunbury	PL 40
Goldfields Gas Transmission Pipeline (1996)	GGT Joint venture (APA Group & Others)	1,426 km	400 mm	Near Compressor Station 1 to Kalgoorlie	PL 24
Parmelia Pipeline (1971)	APA Group	416 km	356 mm	Dongara to Pinjarra	PL 1
Pilbara Energy Pipeline (1996)	APA Group	215 km	450 mm	Karratha to Port Hedland	PL 22
Mid West Gas Pipeline (1999)	APA Group and Western Power	352 km	219 mm	Geraldton to Windimurra	PL 43
Kambalda Esperance Pipeline (2003)	Esperance Pipeline Co	340 km	150 mm	Kambalda to Esperance	PL 59
Telfer Pipeline (2003)	APA Group & EII	443 km	250 mm	Port Hedland to Telfer	PL 60

== Subsea (offshore) pipelines ==
Name (year commissioned)	Owner/operator	Length	Maximum diameter	From/to	Licence number
North Rankin to Withnell Bay (1983)	Woodside	104 km	1016 mm	North Rankin A platform to Withnell Bay (near Dampier)	WA-1 PL
TSEP NWS Pipeline (2004)	Woodside	104 km	1066 mm	North Rankin A platform to Withnell Bay (near Dampier)	WA -10 PL
Varanus Island Gas Sales Line (1992)	Kufpec Australia Ltd	100 km	300 mm	Varanus Island to Compressor Station 1	TPL-8
Varanus Island Gas Sales Line (1999)	Kufpec Australia Ltd	100 km	406 mm	Varanus Island to Compressor Station 1	TPL-13

== See also ==
- Petroleum in Western Australia
- North West Shelf
- List of natural gas pipelines in Queensland
- List of natural gas pipelines in New South Wales
