= Lowendal Islands =

Island group of Western Australia

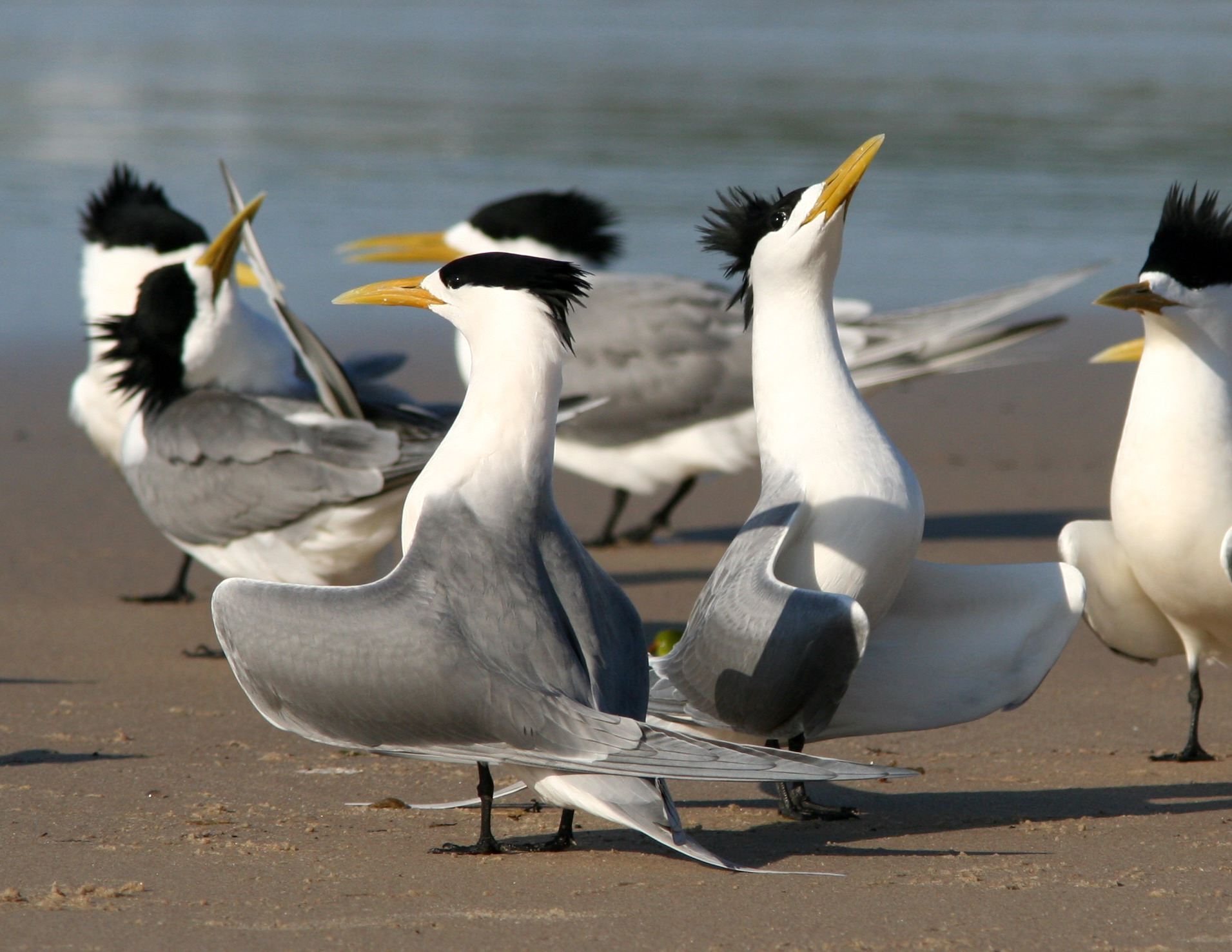
- The archipelago is an important area for crested terns

- Location within Western Australia

Geography
- Location: Indian Ocean
- Coordinates: 20°38′47″S 115°33′56″E

Administration
- Australia
- State: Western Australia
- LGA: Shire of Ashburton

The Lowendal Islands comprise an archipelago, with a total area of about 160 ha of land on the Pilbara coast of Western Australia. It is important for breeding seabirds.

The islands are part of the Lowendal Islands Nature Reserve, which was established in 1976 and has a size of 179 hectares (440 acres).

== Description ==
The archipelago lies 10 km north-east of the much larger Barrow Island, and 15 km south of the Montebello Islands, about 120 km west of the port of Dampier. Of the 34 islands, the largest is 83 ha Varanus Island, 2.5 km long by 600 m wide. Other large islands are Bridled (27 ha), Abutilon (27 ha), Parkinsonia (10 ha), and Beacon (1.5 ha). Geologically, the islands are formed of uplifted and sparsely vegetated limestone. The inshore waters of the archipelago support coral reefs and beds of seagrass and seaweed. Varanus Island houses a gas separation plant, oil storage tanks, and a pipeline for loading offshore tankers.

== Birds ==
The archipelago has been identified by BirdLife International as an Important Bird Area (IBA) because it regularly supports over 1% of the world's population of crested and bridled terns. Other seabirds recorded as having bred on the islands include wedge-tailed shearwaters, pied cormorants, roseate, lesser crested and Caspian terns, and silver gulls.
