= Offshore Constitutional Settlement =

The Offshore Constitutional Settlement (OCS) is an agreement between the Commonwealth of Australia and the States which provides the basis for an agreed division of powers between the Commonwealth and the States in relation to coastal waters and in relation to certain other matters including the regulation of shipping and navigation, offshore petroleum exploration, crimes at sea, and fisheries.

== History ==
=== Convention on Territorial Sea and Contiguous Zone 1958 ===
The United Nations treaty, the Convention on the Territorial Sea and the Contiguous Zone defines "the contiguous zone" as not extending beyond "twelve miles from which the baseline from which the breadth of the territorial sea is measured."

=== Seas and Submerged Lands Act 1973 ===
The Seas and Submerged Lands Act 1973 incorporates the Convention on Territorial Sea and Contiguous Zone 1958 in domestic law.

=== New South Wales and Others v. Commonwealth of Australia ===
The six states took the federal Government to court over the Seas and Submerged Lands Act 1973. The High Court of Australia upheld the act and asserted that control over the coastal waters was in the hands of the Commonwealth.

== Settlement ==
=== Premiers Conference, 1979 ===
On 29 June 1979, the Commonwealth and the states completed an agreement called the "Offshore constitutional settlement".

The agreement outlines several different points of the agreement:

- the Commonwealth Parliament will pass legislation based on Section 51 of the Constitution of Australia to give each state the powers with respect to the adjacent of 3 miles territorial sea, including the seabed beneath the sea
- the area outside the 3 mile territorial sea will be governed by commonwealth legislation alone Petroleum (Submerged Lands) Act 1967
- joint authorities will be established to manage the regulation of petroleum arrangements in the interim period while there are already agreed projects - these were

=== Coastal Waters (State Powers) Act 1980 ===
The Coastal Waters (State Powers) Act 1980 vests the states the power to legislate within 3 nautical miles.

=== Coastal Waters (State Title) Act 1980 ===
The Coastal Waters (State Title) Act 1980 vests the states the right and title to the property within 3 nautical miles.

=== Coastal Waters (Northern Territory Powers) Act 1980 ===
The Coastal Waters (Northern Territory Powers) Act 1980 vests the Northern Territory the title of within 3 nautical miles.

=== Coastal Waters (Northern Territory Title) Act 1980 ===
The Coastal Waters (Northern Territory Title) Act 1980 vests the Northern Territory the right and title to the property within 3 nautical miles.

== Further developments ==
Under the Crimes at Sea Act 2000 (Cth), the criminal law of each state applies to all 12 miles of the territorial sea.

== Discussion ==
Until the settlement there had never been any national oceans policy. The OCS has been described as reflecting Australia's "inherently federal public policy-making".

=== International comparison ===
The settlement has drawn comparisons to the United States' and Canada's federalist arrangements. Unlike Australia, the Canadian federal government has attempted to assert a 12-mile territorial sea, and only Newfoundland and Labrador has been able to assert a 3-mile sea. The equivalent arrangements for the United States are governed by the Submerged Lands Act.

=== Criticism ===
The settlement has been described as an "intergovernmental arrangement to sidestep an unpopular High Court decision" rather than a constitutional settlement.

The situation created by the settlement has been criticised as a "muddle" of state and Northern Territory laws.

== See also ==
- Submerged Lands Act
