= WAPET =

West Australian Petroleum Pty Ltd
- Type: Subsidiary
- Industry: Oil & gas exploration
- Founded: 1952
- Founder: Ampol; Caltex
- Defunct: 2000
- Number of locations: Western Australia
- Area served: Western Australia
- Products: Crude oil, natural gas, petroleum products
- Services: Oil & gas exploration and production
- Parent: Caltex Australia

West Australian Petroleum Pty Ltd (WAPET) was an oil & gas exploration and processing company in Western Australia.

== History ==
Formed in March 1952 as a joint venture between Ampol and Caltex, the company discovered Australia's first flowing oil in November the following year, at Rough Range on the North West Cape. The first oil discovery in Australia was made near Lakes Entrance, Victoria in 1924.

The Rough Range well flowed with heavy crude oil, initially at 400 barrels (64 m^{3}) per day from a depth of 1099 metres, but further drilling in 1954 demonstrated the discovery to be small with low flow rates and it was deemed to be not commercial.

== Dongara ==
In 1964 WAPET discovered the first commercial natural gas field in the state, at Dongara in the Perth Basin. The Dongara field is now wholly owned by Arc Energy and had produced 452.6×10^{9} cu ft (1.282×10^{10} m^{3}) of LNG to August 2007.

The Dongara discovery resulted in the construction of the first gas pipeline in Western Australia, from Dongara to Pinjarra in 1971 by a WAPET subsidiary, West Australian Natural Gas. Also known as the Parmelia Pipeline, it comprises 416 km of 350 mm diameter pipe.

== Barrow Island ==
The company was joined by Shell as a partner in 1964 and shortly after, the joint venture made its major find, on Barrow Island. Despite an expectation of likely oil deposits, Barrow Island had had government bans on drilling and exploration due to the 1952 atomic bomb testing on the nearby Montebello Islands. The bans were lifted in 1953 and WAPET was granted exploration permits. The drill hole "Barrow-1" flowed with heavy crude and proved to be a significant discovery. After $100 million had been spent on further exploration and development, the find led to commercial production in 1967. In 1966 it was estimated to have recoverable reserves of 85 million barrels (13,500,000 m^{3}) and after production started in April 1967, estimated reserves were increased to 250 million barrels (40,000,000 m^{3}). In 1995 there were 430 wells producing oil and natural gas across most of the southern half of the island. At one stage, the site was Australia's largest oil producer.

As a result of the success at Barrow Island and other finds, extensive off-shore exploration in the Carnarvon Basin was undertaken by Australian and American oil companies during the late 1960s and 1970s. WAPET discovered a significant gas deposit at West Tryal Rocks, north west of Barrow Island in 1973, and in 1980 the Gorgon gas deposit. The region is now known as Greater Gorgon and will be developed in coming years as the Gorgon gas project, operated by Chevron, WAPET's successor. LNG reserves in the Greater Gorgon fields are estimated to exceed 40 trillion cubic feet (1,100 km^{3}).

== Chevron Australia ==
After the merger of Caltex Australia and Ampol in 1995, WAPET was wound up with its functions taken over by Chevron in February 2000.
