= Rough Range =

Rough Range is a location in Western Australia where oil was discovered during an exploration drilling programme in 1953.

West Australian Petroleum (WAPET) drilled its first well at Rough Range near North West Cape in 1953. The well produced oil at a rate of 87 cubic metres per day (550 barrels per day), and was the first working well of the Australian commercial petroleum industry. Despite being abandoned as non-commercial in the mid 1950s, consideration was given in the 2000s to re-work the find.
