= Marc McGinnes =

Environmental leader, lawyer, and educator

J. Marc McGinnes (born September 27, 1941) is an environmental leader, lawyer, and educator. He became a public interest environmental lawyer and led the founding of the Community Environmental Council (1970) and the Environmental Defense Center (1977).

== Education ==
McGinnes received his BA in History from Stanford University in 1963. He attended the UC Berkeley School of Law and received his law degree in 1966. In 1967, McGinnes received his post-JD degree from Nancy-Université France.

== Teaching career ==
In 1971, McGinnes joined the faculty of the Environmental Studies Program of the University of California, Santa Barbara, one of the first undergraduate programs of its kind in the United States. In 1983, he began full-time there, developing courses for both the Environmental Studies and Law and Society programs. He also served in various campus advisory and administrative positions. Since 2005, he has served in an emeritus capacity. In 2016, McGinnes donated his research papers, teaching and practice papers and materials to the UCSB Library. In 2017 he developed and convened a seminar titled Hope That Works.

== Environmental Rights Work ==
After the 1969 Santa Barbara oil blowout and subsequent oil spill, Rep. Pete McCloskey urged McGinnes, then practicing law in San Francisco, to go to Santa Barbara to assist in that community’s response. McGinnes served as chair of the national Environmental Rights Day conference in Santa Barbara following the oil spill.

In 1970, McGinnes was the founding president of the Community Environmental Council, one of the nation’s first ecology center/think tanks. In 1977 he was the founding chief counsel of the Environmental Defense Center, one of the nation’s first regional public-interest environmental law firms.

== Books ==
- In Love with Earth: Testimonies and Heartsongs of an Environmental Elder (Mercury Press International, 2018).
- Principles of Environmental Law (Rainbow Bridge, 1980).
- Rise Up! A Stilter’s Adventures in Higher Consciousness (Mercury Press International, 2017).
