= Submerged Lands Act =

US law recognizing state ownership of certain lands

- Long title: An Act to confirm and establish the titles of the States to lands beneath navigable waters within State boundaries and to the natural resources within such lands and waters, to provide for the use and control of said lands and resources, and to confirm the jurisdiction and control of the United States over the natural resources of the seabed of the Continental Shelf seaward of State boundaries.
- Nicknames: Submerged Lands Act of 1953
- Enacted by: the 83rd United States Congress
- Effective: May 22, 1953

Citations
- Public law: Pub. L. 83–31
- Statutes at Large: 67 Stat. 29

Codification
- Titles amended: 43 U.S.C.: Public Lands
- U.S.C. sections created: 43 U.S.C. ch. 29 § 1301 et seq.

Legislative history
- Introduced in the House as H.R. 4198; Committee consideration by House Judiciary; Passed the House on April 1, 1953 (285-108); Passed the Senate on May 5, 1953 (56-35, in lieu of S.J.Res. 13); Signed into law by President Dwight D. Eisenhower on May 22, 1953

The Submerged Lands Act of 1953 is a U.S. federal law that recognized the title of the states to submerged navigable lands within their boundaries at the time they entered the Union. They include navigable waterways, such as rivers, as well as marine waters within the state's boundaries, generally three geographical miles (almost exactly 3 nautical miles or 5.6 kilometres) from the coastline.

The Submerged Lands Act of 1953 was immediately followed by the Outer Continental Shelf Lands Act. Under the latter, the Secretary of the Interior is responsible for the administration of mineral exploration and development of the Outer Continental Shelf (O.C.S.). The Secretary of the Interior is empowered to grant leases to the highest qualified responsible bidder and to formulate regulations as necessary to carry out the provisions of the Act. O.C.S.L.A. provides guidelines for implementing an Outer Continental Shelf oil and gas exploration and development program.

== See also ==
- Offshore Constitutional Settlement
