= Varanus Island =

Island on the Pilbara coast of Western Australia

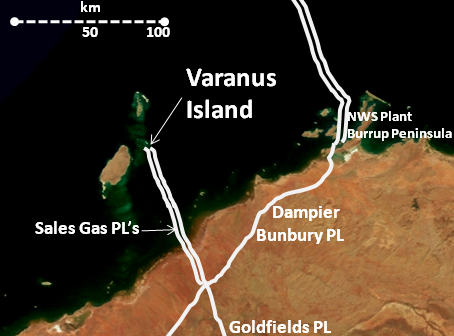
- Varanus Island off Western Australia

- Location within Western Australia

Geography
- Location: Indian Ocean, off the coast of Western Australia
- Coordinates: 20°39′3″S 115°34′27″E
- Archipelago: Lowendal Islands
- Area: 0.83 km^{2} (0.32 sq mi)
- Length: 2.5 km (1.55 mi)
- Width: 0.6 km (0.37 mi)

Administration
- Australia
- State: Western Australia

Varanus Island is the largest of the Lowendal Islands, an archipelago off the north west coast of Western Australia, near Karratha in the Pilbara region. The island is approximately 59 km (37 mi) from the mainland coast. It is located at 20°39′3″S 115°34′27″E.

== Facilities ==
It has facilities for piping oil and gas from various locations within the Harriet and East Spar oilfield, that was developed by the Bond Corporation in 1987, that is now known as the Varanus Island Processing Hub and owned by Santos Limited.

== Environment ==
The island is part of the Lowendal Islands Important Bird Area, identified as such by BirdLife International because of its importance as a breeding site for seabirds. The presence of oil and gas field operations appear to not have significantly affected local birdlife.

== 2008 gas crisis ==
On 3 June 2008, Apache Energy's primary gas pipeline ruptured, causing an explosion. The plant was shut down, and all personnel on the island were airlifted out.

== See also ==
- APA Corporation – American energy company
- Barrow Island (Western Australia) – Island off the coast of Western Australia
