= James Mortimer =

James Mortimer may refer to:

- James Mortimer (chess player) (1833–1911), American/British chess player, journalist, and playwright
- James Mortimer (dogshow judge) (1842–1915), British dogshow judge
- Jim Mortimer (1921–2013), British trade unionist and General Secretary of the Labour Party
- William James Mortimer (died 2010), publisher, president and editor of the Deseret News
- James Mortimer (hurdler) (born 1983), New Zealand hurdler
- James Mortimer, a character in The Hound of the Baskervilles
