= J Malan Heslop =

American WWII combat photographer (1923–2011)

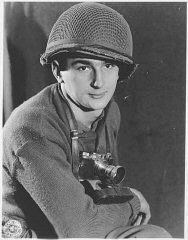
Portrait of J Malan Heslop. — courtesy of J Malan Heslop, United States Holocaust Memorial Museum.

J Malan Heslop (18 June 1923 in Taylor, Weber County, Utah – 29 July 2011 Salt Lake City, Utah) was a World War II combat photographer with Arnold E. Samuelson's Combat Assignment Unit #123 of the 167th Signal Photographic Company who documented evidence of Nazi war crimes. He later served as editor of the Church News and managing editor of the Deseret News.

Heslop served as a freelance photographer in his native Utah and was employed at the Ogden Standard Examiner before setting off to California, where he studied the craft at Los Angeles City College.

== Early life ==
J Malan Heslop was born on June 18, 1923, in Taylor, Utah. He was the oldest of three children of Jesse and Zella Malan Heslop. His family relocated to a farm in West Weber, Utah when he was three years old. Jesse Heslop encouraged and inspired J Malan Heslop's photography career. Using his father's camera, Heslop practiced taking photos and developing prints. He attended Weber High School where he participated in track and field, played trombone in the school band, and was a member of the Photography Club. He took photos for the school yearbook. His first camera was a 35 mm Argus C-3 with a f3.5 lens and a flash. He graduated from Weber High School on May 17, 1941. He then enrolled at Weber College in the fall of 1941. His first photography job was with the Ogden Standard Examiner. His photos of an airport fire made the front page of the Examiner. He studied photography at Los Angeles City College. He enlisted in the United States Army Reserve in October 1942. In November, he started studying at Paramount Studios with the Signal Corps Photographers School. He was part of the 167 Signal Photographic Company.

== World War II ==
J Malan Heslop completed his basic training in Lebanon, Tennessee, where he took his first official army photographs. He received the rank of Technician 5th grade, T/5, which is the equivalent of a Corporal. He was sent to Europe on July 23, 1944, on the Mauritania. He served for nine months during the end of World War II in the European Theater from September 1944 to May 1945. He served in Austria, Belgium, France, Luxembourg, and Germany. He documented significant people, organizations, and events during World War II, among these: the Counterintelligence Corps, Charles de Gaulle and Winston Churchill in Paris, and the Battle of the Bulge. In May 1945, he photographed the liberation of the Ebensee concentration camp, a subcamp of the Mauthausen-Gusen concentration camp in Austria. He was one of the first American photographers to document evidence of Nazi crimes and the prisoners at Ebensee.

== Deseret News ==
After the war, he graduated from Utah State Agricultural College (now Utah State University) in Logan, Utah (June, 1948) with a degree in agriculture. He joined the Deseret News newspaper in Salt Lake City, Utah. Shortly after joining the Deseret News staff he was made chief photographer, a position he held for the next 20 years. From 1968 to 1976 he served as editor of the Church News, which is distributed both as an insert in the Deseret News and through mail distribution to areas outside the Deseret News's base readership area. In 1976, Heslop became the managing editor of Church News, a position he held from then until 1981 and again from 1983 until 1988.

== LDS Church ==
Heslop was a member of the Church of Jesus Christ of Latter-day Saints. Among the positions he held in the church were bishop of the Salt Lake 26th Ward, counselor in the stake presidency of the Salt Lake Pioneer Stake, president of the Salt Lake Stake, member of the YMMIA General Board, regional representative, president of the Chicago North Mission, and stake patriarch.

Heslop also wrote several books and plays with Dell Van Orden. He was involved in the formation of the group that eventually became the Mormon Historic Sites Foundation.

== Family ==
J Malan Heslop married Fae Stokes on May 1, 1944, in the Salt Lake Temple just before he went to Europe during World War II. They later became the parents of five children Paul, Lyn, Scott, Ann, and Don. The Heslops also wrote an autobiography Doubletree Adventure: Autobiography of J Malan and Eleanor Fae Stokes Heslop.

== Legacy ==
Brigham Young University through its Saints at War Project headed by Robert C. Freeman has digitized and made available on-line more than 1,000 of Heslop's war photos from World War II. The United States National Archives and the National Holocaust Museum (United States) also have collections of Heslop's World War II era photos.

== Publications ==
- From the Shadow of Death: Stories of POWs (with Dell R. Van Orden) Deseret Book, 1973.
- Joseph Fielding Smith: A Prophet Among the People. Deseret Book, 1971. ISBN 0-87747-454-0
- How to Compile Your Family History. Bookcraft, 1978. ISBN 0-88494-344-5
