= Ensign Peak Foundation =

Independent Mormon historical organization

The Ensign Peak Foundation (formerly the Mormon Historic Sites Foundation) is an independent organization that seeks to contribute to the memorialization of sites important to the history of the Church of Jesus Christ of Latter-day Saints. The organization also maintains a Sites Registry database of historic sites related to the Latter Day Saint movement.

== History ==
The foundation was originally started in 1992 as the Ensign Peak Foundation, involved in the creation of Ensign Peak Park in Salt Lake City, Utah. After the success of this project the organization changed to the Mormon Historic Sites Foundation and undertook a broader mission. Their next major project was the restoration of Kirtland, Ohio including the working towards the relocation of the main road so visitors would not have to compete with traffic in visiting the historic sites there.

The new name of the organization first appeared in the LDS Church News, about a ceremony held in 1998 to remember the Haun's Mill Massacre, held jointly by the MHSF and the Missouri Mormon Frontier Foundation.

In 2020 the organization returned to its original name, Ensign Peak Foundation, after the LDS Church discouraged use of the "Mormon" nickname.

== Publications ==
The Foundation published a semiannual scholarly journal called Mormon Historical Studies. It features "essays, biographies, documents, book reviews, historical site descriptions, indexes, and archival listings relevant to subjects of general interest to Latter-day Saints".

Mormon Historical Studies was originally the Nauvoo Journal until its name change in spring 2000. The Nauvoo Journal started with Lyman D. Platt and the Early Mormon Research Institute in 1989, intending to aid Mormon History "by bringing to light previously unknown and little used records, by correcting false research and traditions, by indexing of other difficult records, and by publishing many sources that are inaccessible to hundreds of interested family historians and genealogists".

In 2020 the journal was renamed to Latter-day Saint Historical Studies.

== See also ==
- Historic Kirtland Village – Place in Ohio, United States
- J Malan Heslop – Former president
- Junius F. Wells – The Junius F. Wells Award is given to individuals who promote the purposes of the Foundation.
