= Arnold E. Samuelson =

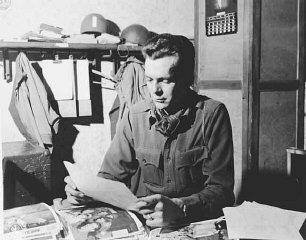
Portrait of U.S. combat photographer Arnold E. Samuelson. France, 1944-1945, courtesy of J Malan Heslop, United States Holocaust Memorial Museum.

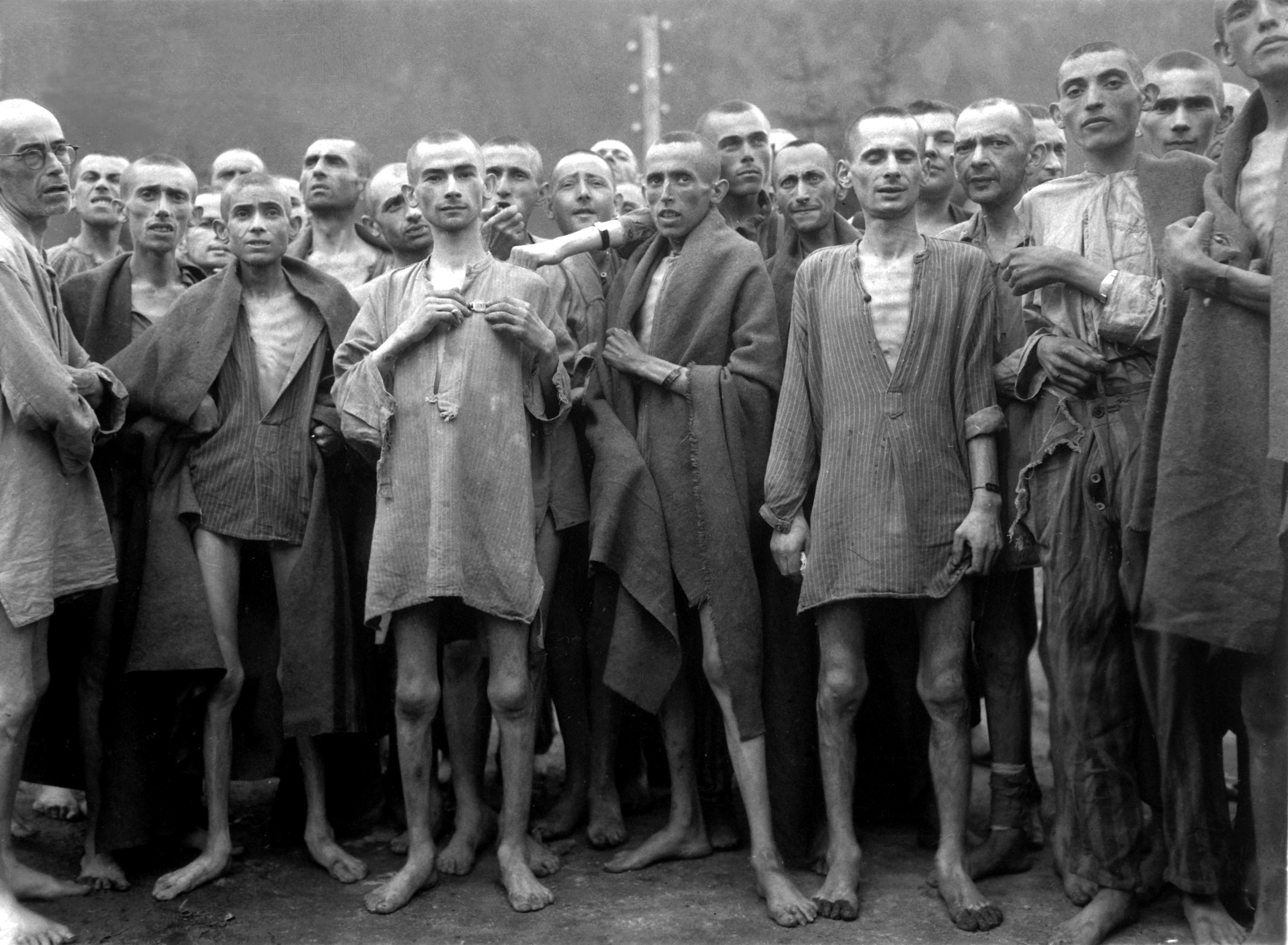
Photograph of Mauthausen prisoners by Arnold E. Samuelson

Arnold Edmund Samuelson (1917–2002) was a combat photographer during World War II who was among the first Allied photographers to document Nazi war crimes.

Before America's entry into World War II, Samuelson worked for the Eastman Kodak Company in Portland, Oregon. In May 1942, he was inducted into the U.S. Army. He served in the Army Air Forces and later joined the Signal Corps in January 1943.

Three months after D-Day (June 6, 1944), Samuelson came ashore on the Normandy beaches with the 167th Signal Photographic Company and began documenting the Allied military campaigns in France and Belgium. He saw service in the Battle of the Bulge (December 1944), and, in 1945, he was given command of Combat Assignment Unit #123. That unit consisted of two motion picture cameramen, John O'Brian and Edward Urban, and two still photographers, J Malan Heslop and Walter McDonald.

Samuelson's group served initially with the 9th Armored Division, advancing as far as Leipzig, then was attached to the 80th Infantry Division as it moved southward to Bavaria and Austria.

During this campaign, Samuelson's crew was the first group of Allied photographers to document Nazi crimes and the plight of concentration camp prisoners at Lenzing and Ebensee, two subcamps of the Mauthausen concentration camp in Austria.
