= O. Preston Robinson =

Professor of advertising

Oliver Preston Robinson (1903–1990) was a prominent advertising professor at the University of Utah and later editor of the Deseret News.

Robinson was born in Farmington, Utah, to James Henry Robinson and his wife Romania Elizabeth Chaffin. In 1922, he began college as a student at the University of Utah. Robinson served as a missionary for the Church of Jesus Christ of Latter-day Saints (LDS Church) in France from 1924 to 1927. In 1928, he graduated from Brigham Young University with a bachelor's degree. He married Christine Hinckley, a daughter of Bryant S. Hinckley, in the Salt Lake Temple in 1929. Robinson received a master's degree from New York University (NYU). He also took special courses at the Ludwig-Maximilians-Universität München and the University of Grenoble. He later received a Ph.D. in marketing and retail from NYU. He taught at NYU until 1947 when he went to the University of Utah, where he was head of the retailing department in the business school. Robinson had worked for Hofstra University while completing his Ph.D. At other times he worked as a training specialist for J. C. Penney and as a professor at the University of Newark. While living in New York, he also served as a branch president in the LDS Church.

While a professor at the University of Utah, one of Robinson's students was Thomas S. Monson.

In 1950, Robinson became assistant manager of the Deseret News. In 1952, he was made general manager of Deseret News Publishing Company and editor of the Deseret News.

Robinson was president of the Utah Symphony. He was also a moderator of the Nixon/Brown California gubernatorial debates in 1962.

From 1964 to 1967, Robinson was president of the British Mission of the LDS Church, headquartered in London. He also served on the General Board of the Deseret Sunday School Union.

Robinson wrote and edited many books, some with his wife Christine. Among the works he edited was the journal of his great-grandfather, Joseph Lee Robinson. Other works he wrote include Store Salesmanship, Dead Sea Scrolls and Original Christianity, Christ's Eternal Gospel: Do the Dead Sea Scrolls, Pseudepigrapha, and Other Ancient Records Challenge or Support the Bible (Salt Lake City, Utah: Deseret Book, 1976) ISBN 0-87747-616-0. One of his books, Successful Retail Sales, was illustrated by J. Rulon Hales, the father of Robert D. Hales.

Robinson and his wife Christine were the parents of three children.

== Sources ==
- Deseret News article on Robinson's funeral
- bio connected with BYU collection of Robinson's papers
- Heidi S. Swinton. To The Rescue: The Biography of Thomas S. Monson. Salt Lake City: Deseret Book Company, 2010. p. 107.
- Good Reads listing for Robinson
- Nov. 11, 1990 Deseret News article on Robinson's death
- Open library entry for Robinson
