= Wheatley Institute =

American Christian think tank

The Wheatley Institute of Brigham Young University (BYU) is an American Christian think tank whose mission is to "fortif[y] the core institutions of the family, religion, and constitutional government". As of 2022, the institute's director is Paul S. Edwards, who succeeded Richard N. Williams, its first director.

The organization started in 2007 and was founded through the efforts of Jack Wheatley. Wheatley previously spent more than 20 years on the board of Stanford University's Hoover Institution and wanted BYU's Wheatley Institute to fulfill a similar role.

The Wheatley Institute regularly invites outside speakers. In 2021, speaker-guests included Mitt Romney, Robert D. Putnam, and Rabbi Meir Soloveichik.

Previously, the Wheatley Institute hosted guests such as Zbigniew Brzezinski and Condoleezza Rice. These visits were organized by former senior fellow at the Wheatley Institute, Amos Jordan.

In October 2009, the Wheatley Institute sponsored a symposium opposing the New Atheism.

The Wheatley Institute's Executive Council consists of:

- Charles S. Wheatley, Principal, Wheatley Financial Consulting LLC
- Kim B. Clark, a NAC Professor of Business Management at BYU's Marriott School of Business (MSB)
- Brigitte C. Madrian; Dean and Marriott Distinguished Professor in BYU's MSB
- C. Shane Reese; President of BYU
- Justin M. Collings; BYU's Academic Vice President
