= Paul S. Edwards =

American journalist

Paul S. Edwards is an American journalist and academic and previous editor of the Deseret News. As of 2019, he is the director of the Jack and Mary Lois Wheatley Institution of Brigham Young University (BYU).

== Education ==
Edwards graduated from BYU with honors and received both a JD and PhD in jurisprudence and social policy from the University of California, Berkeley. After law school, Edwards clerked for Judge Cecil F. Poole of the Ninth Circuit Court of Appeals.

== Career ==
Edwards taught in the political science department at BYU before becoming vice president for academic affairs at the Institute for Humane Studies. Prior to joining the Deseret News as the paper's opinion editor, Edwards served as executive vice president and provost at Southern Virginia University and as president of the Mercatus Center at George Mason University. In 2011, Edwards was appointed editor of the Deseret News, Utah's longest running daily. Edwards has appeared on Fox News and is a frequent commentator on religion in the public square, especially the Church of Jesus Christ of Latter-day Saints.

Edwards stepped down from the Deseret News in 2016 to take a position as assistant chief of staff in the administration of Utah Governor Gary Herbert, later becoming deputy chief of staff for policy and strategic communications.

In June 2019, it was announced that Edwards would leave Herbert's staff and become the director of the Wheatley Institution at BYU. He has worked at the Wheatley Institution since August 2019.

== Personal life ==
Edwards and his wife, Margo, are the parents of four children.
