= Georg Bachmayer =

Schutzstaffel (SS) officer (1913–1945)

- Bachmeyer (left) at Mauthausen
- Born: 12 August 1913; Fridolfing, Bavaria, German Empire
- Died: 8 May 1945 (aged 31); Münzbach, Upper Austria, Allied-occupied Austria
- Military career
- Allegiance: Nazi Germany
- Branch: Schutzstaffel
- Service years: 1933–1945
- Rank: Hauptsturmführer (Captain)
- Unit: SS-Totenkopfverbände

Georg Bachmayer (12 August 1913 – 8 May 1945) was an SS-Hauptsturmführer (captain) and member of the SS-Totenkopfverbände who served as the Schutzhaftlagerführer, with responsibility for prisoners while they were inside the Mauthausen concentration camp, he also oversaw granite production in the quarry. In this position he also inspected the satellite camps and supervised the construction of the Ebensee concentration camp. He was considered a brutal sadist:

Bachmayer was clearly a sadist. His speciality was to set two mastiff-like bloodhounds (one in 1944 "Lord") on inmates, which would literally tear them to death. This was known in camp jargon as 'dying from the dog's kiss'. The real cause of death from a medical point of view was usually general sepsis, if the inmate did not die immediately of heart failure. Of the thousands of inmates that Bachmayer himself killed or tortured, just two cases are mentioned here. One day the evening roll call in block 20 did not tally and one inmate was missing. In block 20 the unfortunate victims of Action K were housed under special security measures [...] where they were left to die of hunger. When the missing inmate was noticed, all the other inmates in the entire camp were first required to fall in and remain standing in the roll call area. At the same time a search was initiated and the missing inmate was ultimately found in one of the normal inmate blocks where he had hidden in the hope of avoiding starvation. When Bachmayer received the report that the inmate had been found, he was standing by chance next to the undersigned. He began to tremble with gleeful excitement and said half to himself 'I'll batter this one to death myself', which he then proceeded to do.

— Gerhard Kanthack, former German government official and political prisoner at Mauthausen (AMM V/3/20)

Several examples of Bachmayer's brutality are described by Vasily Bunelik and General Officer Georges Loustaunau-Lacau:

The most appalling scene is in February 1945: massacre with an axe of three hundred deportees driven back from another camp. The most revolting methods of destruction employed by Commander S. S. Bachmayer and his deputies completed the natural work of hunger and cold.

Bachmayer committed suicide nearby Prihetsberg (Austria) on 8 May 1945, after shooting his wife and two children.

== Bachmayer's awards and decorations in the SS ==
- War Merit Cross 2nd Class With Swords
- SS Long Service Award
- SA-Sports Badge in Bronze
- Anschluss Medal
