= Deseret News =

Weekly newspaper in Salt Lake City, Utah

- Truth and Liberty

- Deseret.com homepage and Deseret Magazine
- Type: Daily (online); Weekly (print; local & national editions); Monthly (magazine)
- Format: Broadsheet
- Owner: The Church of Jesus Christ of Latter-day Saints via Deseret Management Corporation
- Publisher: Burke Olsen
- Editor: Doug Wilks and Sarah Jane Weaver
- Founded: June 15, 1850; 176 years ago
- Headquarters: 55 N 300 W Salt Lake City, Utah, U.S.
- Circulation: 40,719 Weekday (print); 109,330 Sunday (print); 98,382 Weekday (digital); 98,150 Sunday (digital) (as of May 2014)
- ISSN: 0745-4724
- OCLC number: 367900153
- Website: deseret.com

The Deseret News (/ˌdɛzəˈrɛt/) is a US multi-platform newspaper based in Salt Lake City, published by Deseret News Publishing Company, a subsidiary of Deseret Management Corporation, which is owned by the Church of Jesus Christ of Latter-day Saints (LDS Church). Founded in 1850, it was the first newspaper to be published in Utah. The publication's name is from the geographic area of Deseret identified by Utah's pioneer settlers, and much of the publication's reporting is rooted in that region.

As of 2026, Deseret News develops daily content for its website and app, in addition to a weekly printing of the Deseret News Local Edition and National Edition. The company also produces a weekly print edition of the Church News and 10 editions of Deseret Magazine per year.

== Founding and early years ==
=== 19th century ===
==== The press ====
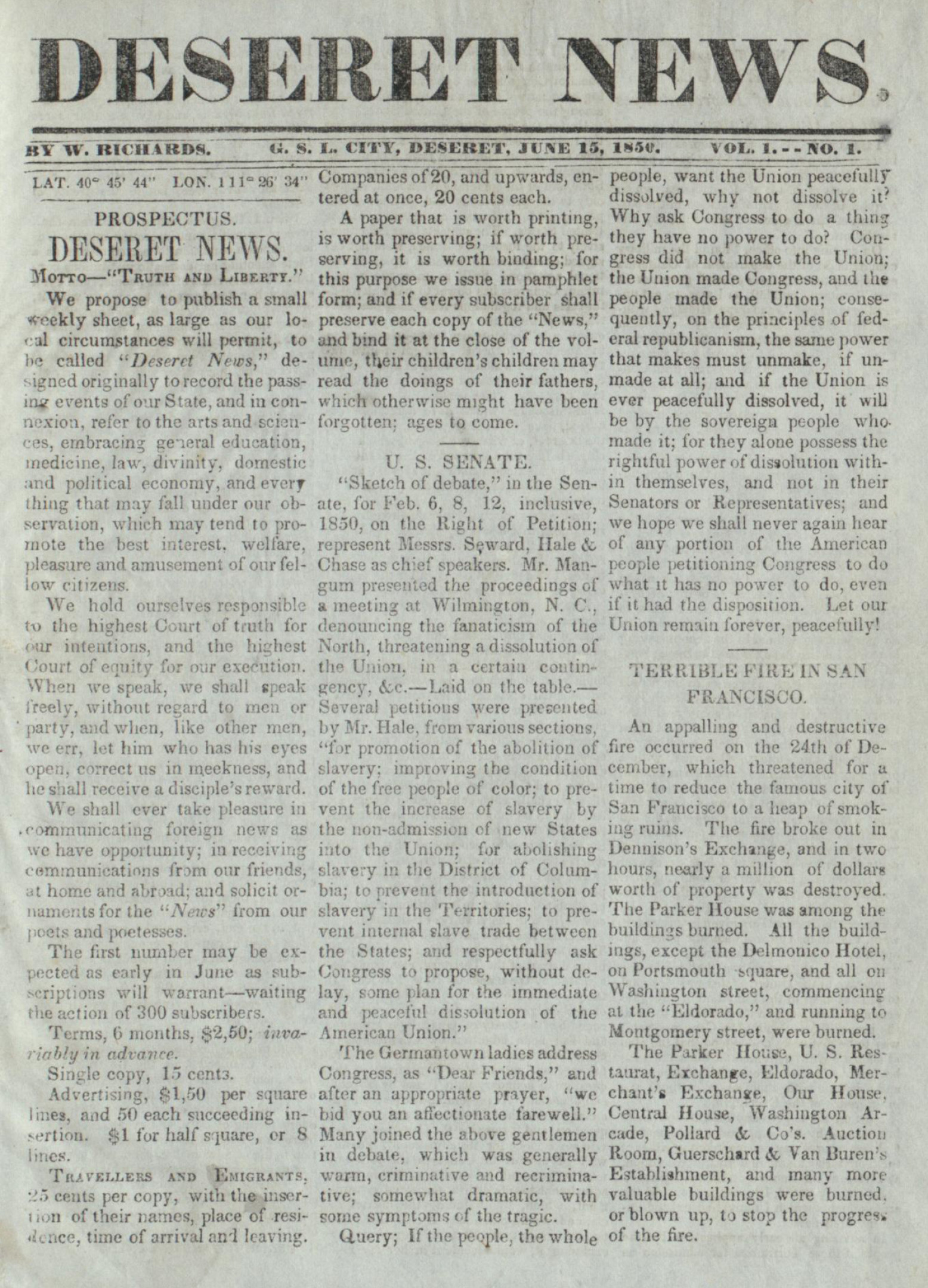
Front page of the first issue of the Deseret News, published June 15, 1850

On March 31, 1847, while at Winter Quarters, Nebraska, the LDS Church's Quorum of the Twelve Apostles authorized William W. Phelps to "go east and procure a printing press" to be taken to the future Mormon settlement in the Great Basin. Phelps left Winter Quarters sometime in May, and went to Boston by way of the former Mormon settlement of Nauvoo, Illinois. In Boston, with the help of William I. Appleby, the president of the Church's Eastern States Mission, and Church member Alexander Badlam, Phelps was able to procure a wrought iron Ramage hand-press, type, and other required equipment. He returned to Winter Quarters on November 12, 1847, with the press. Due partly to its size and weight, the press and equipment would not be taken to Salt Lake City until 1849. By that time many of the Mormon pioneers had left Winter Quarters and the press was moved across the Missouri River to another temporary Mormon settlement, Kanesville, Iowa. In April 1849, the press and other church property was loaded onto ox drawn wagons, and traveled with the Howard Egan Company along the Mormon Trail. The wagon company, with the press, arrived in the Salt Lake Valley August 7, 1849.

The press was moved into a small adobe building (just east of the present site of the Hotel Utah) that also served as a coin mint for the settlers. The press was at first used to print the necessary documents (such as laws, records, and forms) used in setting up the provisional State of Deseret. Prior to its arrival, legal documents had to be printed in Iowa, the location of the nearest printing press.

==== First issue ====
The first issue of the Deseret News was published June 15, 1850, and was eight pages long. This first issue included the paper's prospectus, written by the editor Willard Richards, along with news from the United States Congress, and a report on the San Francisco 1849 Christmas Eve fire; an event which had occurred six months prior. Because it was meant to be the voice of the State of Deseret, it was called the Deseret News, and its motto was "Truth and Liberty". It was at first a weekly Saturday publication, and published in "pamphlet form" in hopes that readers would have the papers bound into volumes. Subscription rate was $2.50 for six months.

A jobs press, usually called the Deseret News Press, was also set up so the News could print books, booklets, handbills, broadsides, etc., for paying customers and other publishers.

==== Paper ====
From the beginning, paper shortages were a problem for the News staff. Starting with the October 19, 1850, issue—only four months after publication began—the paper had to be changed to a bi-weekly publication. Even so, many times in the 1850s there were several periods when the News could not be published for lack of paper; one period lasted three months during the fall of 1851.

Thomas Howard, a Mormon immigrant from England, and a paper-maker, approached Brigham Young about using some machinery—originally meant for producing sugar—to make their own paper; Young agreed to the plan. The publishers asked everyone to donate old paper and cloth to the venture. In the summer of 1854 the first issues of the News were published on "homemade paper" that was very thick, and grayish in color.

Even with paper shortages, occasionally a News extra would be published, if there were important news or a sermon that could not wait for the regular publication date.

==== Utah War ====
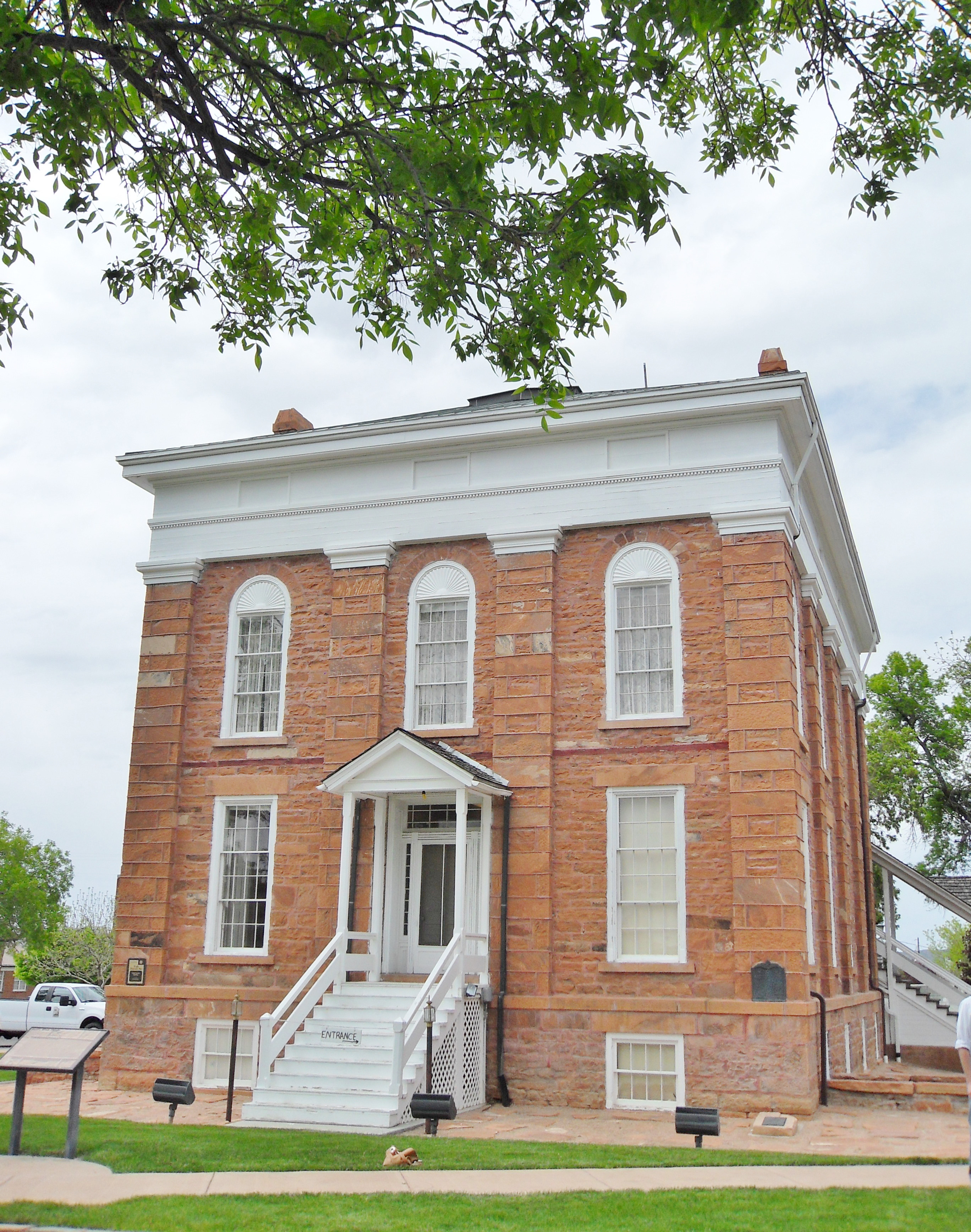
The Utah Territorial Statehouse, home of the News during the Utah War

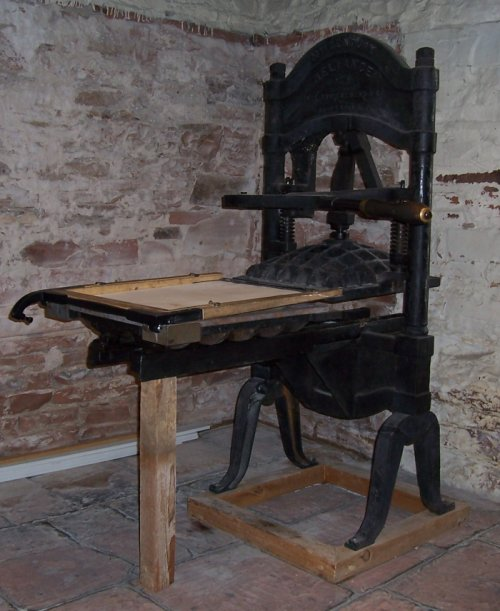
An early News printing press displayed in the statehouse basement

During a turbulent time period, later known as the Utah War, the News presses and equipment were moved to the central and southern parts of the state. As armed forces of the United States camped just outside the state at Fort Bridger, George Q. Cannon was assigned to take some presses and equipment to Fillmore while Henry McEwan was to take the remainder to Parowan. On May 5, 1858, the first issue of the News with Fillmore City as the publication place appeared; issues would continue to be printed in both Fillmore and Parowan until September 1858 While in Fillmore, the press was kept in the basement of the Utah Territorial Statehouse. That fall the presses were brought back to Salt Lake City and placed in the Council House, allowing the News to begin normal operations. The soldiers who had marched to Utah during the war would remain at the newly constructed Camp Floyd. Their need for a newspaper, one not published by the LDS Church, was satisfied with Kirk Anderson's Valley Tan, the area's second newspaper (and first competitor to the News); published November 6, 1858.

During the 1850s through 1860s, numerous articles in the News were printed in the Deseret Alphabet.

==== Challenges and changes ====
The coming of the Pony Express to Utah in 1860 would bring changes to the paper, allowing news from the East to arrive in the Territory much faster. Even so, the paper remained a weekly, with News extras being published with more frequency and temporary renamed The Pony Dispatch.

Yet, paper problems still plagued the publishers; paper was very expensive to haul from California or the East, and attempts at making paper in the valley were still, for the most part, futile. In 1860 a paper-making machine had been purchased, and set-up in the Deseret Manufacturing Company sugar house factory, but lack of available materials meant a lack of paper. As a result, Brigham Young called George Goddard on a rag-gathering mission. Goddard traveled through the territory collecting rags that would then be turned into paper, and was able to supply enough to keep the News in production. Other problems such as ice and drought on the stream, running out of Parley's Canyon, that ran the paper mill caused the paper to have short lapses in publication.

In October 1861, the lines of the First Transcontinental Telegraph met in Salt Lake City, making the Pony Express obsolete, and bringing news to the Territory almost instantly. The News extras, now sometimes called telegraphic dispatches, were printed with even more frequency.

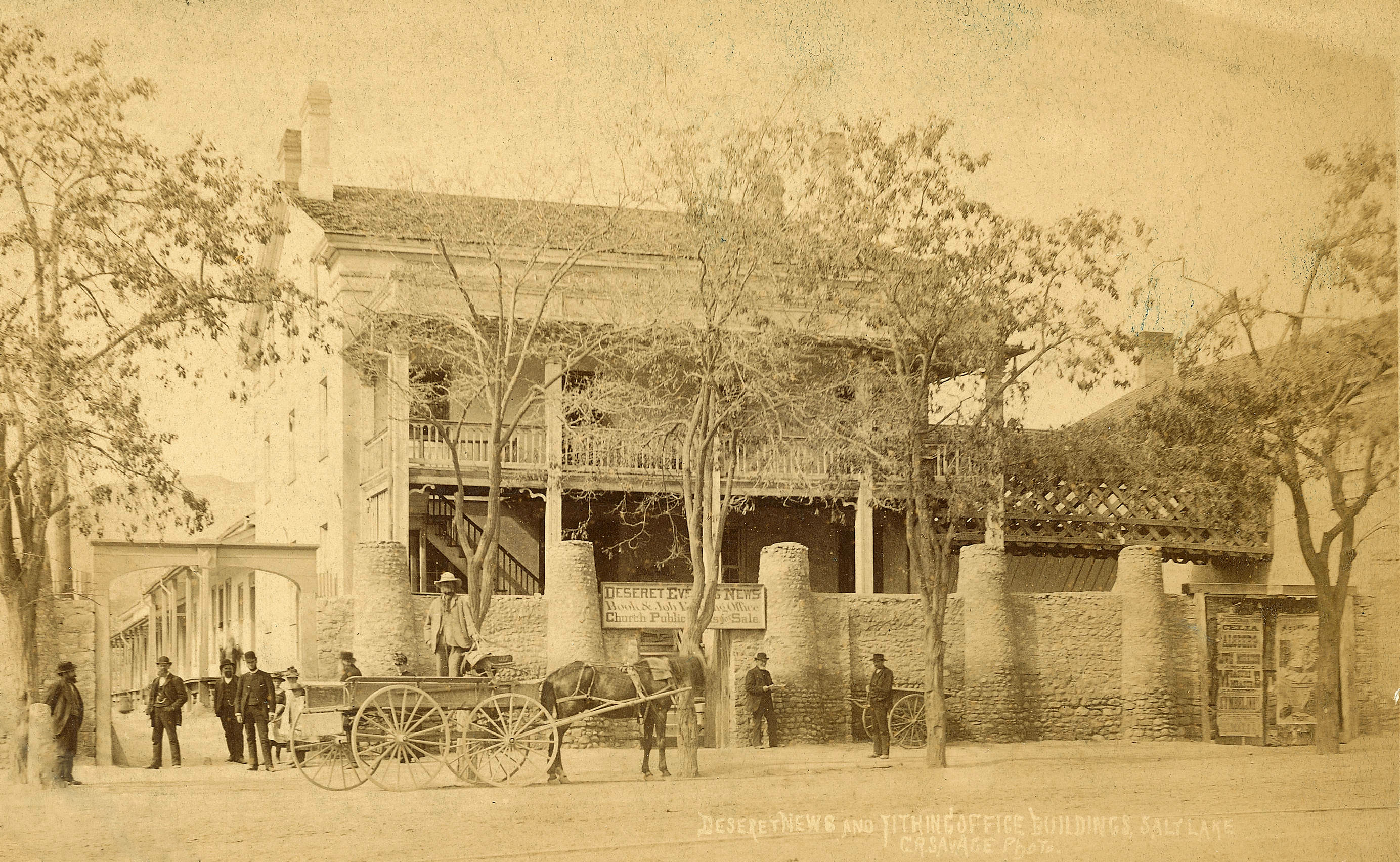
The Deseret Store, home of the Deseret News from 1851 to 1854 and 1862–1903

In March 1862, the News and its staff moved from the Council House to the Deseret Store, and in 1864 a steam-powered printing press arrived; it was placed in the basement the building. The set type was lowered from the offices in the building's upper floor to the basement, through holes in each floor. Later an addition was constructed to the east of this building, and the presses were moved into that building.

On October 8, 1865, the News launched its semi-weekly edition, this allowed news to get out more quickly and allowed for more advertisements. The weekly edition would continue and contained much of the same content as the semi-weekly, but editorials were different.

In November 1867, George Q. Cannon became the editor, and on the 21st of that month, the News published its first daily edition, which was printed in the evening, and as such was named The Deseret Evening News. Most of what was published in the daily edition, was also published in the weekly and semi-weekly, as the daily was meant for city readers and the weekly and semi-weekly for those living in the more rural areas of the territory. Until December 1898 all three editions—the weekly, semi-weekly, and daily—were published concurrently.

In 1870, the Mormon Tribune, later named The Salt Lake Tribune, was first printed, adding a new newspaper rival to the Salt Lake area. Since its founding the Tribune and News have often been involved in "newspaper battles", times when they could not agree on anything, even secular items. During these battles the News has often been called grandmother, granny, or The Mormon Hand Organ.

Since its first publication, the News had been owned directly by the LDS Church, but as worries about property confiscation increased due to the Morrill Anti-Bigamy Act and Poland Act, the paper's ownership was transferred to The Deseret News Company following incorporation on September 3, 1880. About this same time the News began looking for a location to build a new paper mill, as the Sugar House paper plant was inadequate. A new granite plant was constructed near the mouth of Big Cottonwood Canyon, 13 miles south of the paper's offices. The mill began producing paper in April 1883, and was known as the Cottonwood Paper Mill. The News would sell the paper mill in 1892 to the Granite Paper Mills Company. The mill caught fire and was destroyed April 1, 1893.

==== Changing ownership ====
On October 1, 1892, The Deseret News Company leased the News along with all the company's printing, bookbinding, and merchandising to the Cannon family. The family was, at that time, operating the George Q. Cannon & Sons bookstore in downtown Salt Lake City. When the lease began the family formed the Deseret News Printing Company, which was to be the lessee, while The Deseret News Company would remain a legal entity as the lessor. Two children of former News editor George Q. Cannon would play prominent roles during this period, with John Q. Cannon as editor and Abraham H. Cannon as business manager. The leasing had occurred due to financial troubles, and the Cannon family hoped to make the business profitable. This did not happen and the paper's assets and property were transferred back to The Deseret News Company on September 7, 1898; after almost six years under the control of the Cannon family. The family's Deseret News Publishing Company was dissolved after the lease was gone, and within a few months The Deseret News Company was also dissolved and ownership of the paper was returned directly to the LDS Church.

When the LDS Church regained direct control over the News, Horace G. Whitney was appointed business manager and Charles W. Penrose returned as editor. Immediately the paper's weekly edition, The Deseret Weekly, was discontinued; its last issue was published December 10, 1898.

=== 20th century ===
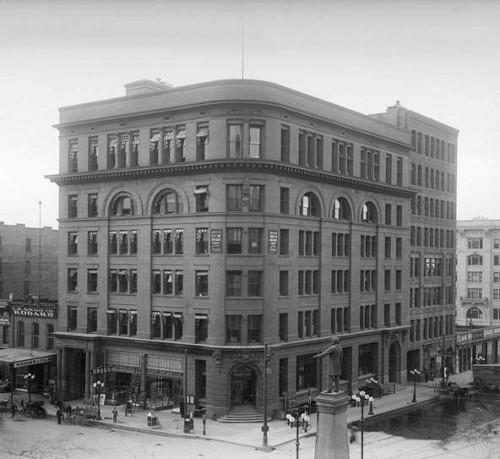
The Deseret News and Union Pacific Building, home of the News from 1903 to 1926

On October 1, 1900, the George Q. Cannon & Sons bookstore was sold to the LDS Church, and renamed the Deseret News Bookstore. In 1920 the Deseret Sunday School Union Bookstore was also consolidated into the Deseret News Bookstore, and eventually the bookstore would become its own company, Deseret Book.

In 1903, the News moved out from its longtime home in the Deseret Store, kitty-corner to a newly constructed building. This was the first time the paper had a building constructed expressly for it. It was designed by Richard K.A. Kletting and built with stone from Mount Nebo in Central Utah. While the building was under construction, a fire destroyed the Oregon Short Line building in Salt Lake City, and the railroad wanted to rent space in the new building. As a result, the News constructed an annex to the west of the new building for more space. This new home was at the site of the former Council House; presently the Beneficial Tower (Gateway Tower West) sits at this location.

The daily, called the Deseret Evening News, was renamed to the Deseret News on June 15, 1920; the paper's 70th anniversary. The semi-weekly was discontinued on June 22, 1922, leaving the daily as the only news publication. Two days later the News announced it had purchased the Utah Farmer, a weekly agricultural paper; which it would eventually sell.

In 1926, the News once again moved into a new building, this time on Richard's Street (just south of the present Deseret Book store in City Creek Center.) This same year, the News began using teletype technology to receive news from the Associated Press.

During the 1920s the paper's circulation nearly doubled, reaching almost 40,000.

==== Radio ====
On November 20, 1920, the News began airing nightly wireless news flashes, called the Deseret News-International News Service bulletins. The paper had also formed The Deseret News Wireless Club, with members across the Western United States who would transcribe the radio bulletins and post them in their communities. In April 1922, the paper received a license to officially operate a radio station, with call letters KZN (later changed to KSL). The station's first regular broadcast aired on May 6, 1922, in the form of a talk by then-LDS Church president Heber J. Grant. In 1924, the station was sold to John Cope and his father, F.W. Cope, who formed the Radio Service Corporation of Utah. The LDS Church would later purchase this corporation and go on to create KSL-TV. The News, KSL Radio, and KSL Television remain closely linked via the global operating company, Deseret Management Corporation, which also owns Bonneville International, Deseret Book Company, and Deseret Media Company, among other organizations.

==== The Deseret News Publishing Company ====
The Deseret News had been under the direct ownership of the LDS Church since 1898, when The Deseret News Company was dissolved. On December 29, 1931, the Deseret News Publishing Company was incorporated (not to be confused with the Deseret News Publishing Company formed in 1892 by the Cannon family to lease ownership of the paper, and dissolved when the lease was over). Its articles of incorporation, filed with the Salt Lake County Clerk, provided for 500 shares of stock, all retained by the LDS Church (with the exception of the qualifying directors' shares).

==== First Sunday edition ====
On May 16, 1948, the Deseret News would deliver its first Sunday paper. The first Sunday edition contained 154 pages with a new farm, home, and garden section. The Sunday edition would continue into the 1950s, when an agreement with The Salt Lake Tribune would cease publication.

==== Newspaper Agency Corporation ====
After World War II, the Deseret News, The Salt Lake Tribune, and the Salt Lake Telegram were all struggling financially, but no more than the Deseret News. In September 1952, the owners of the News (LDS Church) and Tribune (Thomas Kearns Family) entered into a joint operating agreement (JOA), where each published separate editorial material while sharing printing, advertising and circulation costs. This JOA was the brainchild of Tribune Publisher John F. Fitzpatrick who helped LDS Church president David O. McKay ensure the continuation of the Deseret News. As its architect, Fitzpatrick knew that this NAC arrangement would also benefit the Tribune. The Deseret News stopped Sunday publication; subscribers received a Sunday Tribune instead. The Deseret News also purchased the afternoon Salt Lake Telegram from the Tribune. The Telegram was discontinued, and into the mid-1960s, the paper's nameplate read: The Deseret News and Salt Lake Telegram. The 30-year agreement between the two papers was renewed in 1982, with some changes. The Newspaper Agency Corporation was renamed to MediaOne of Utah in 2007.

In 1968, the Deseret News once again moved, this time into a new building on Regent Street.

==== Sunday morning edition ====
The joint operating agreement with the Tribune in 1952 had ended the paper's Sunday edition, but when the 30-year-old agreement was up for renewal, it was changed to allow the Deseret News to publish a Sunday morning edition and change its Saturday publication from an evening to morning paper. The first Sunday morning edition of the Deseret News appeared January 16, 1983, and the paper has published a Sunday edition ever since.

==== Regent Street headquarters ====
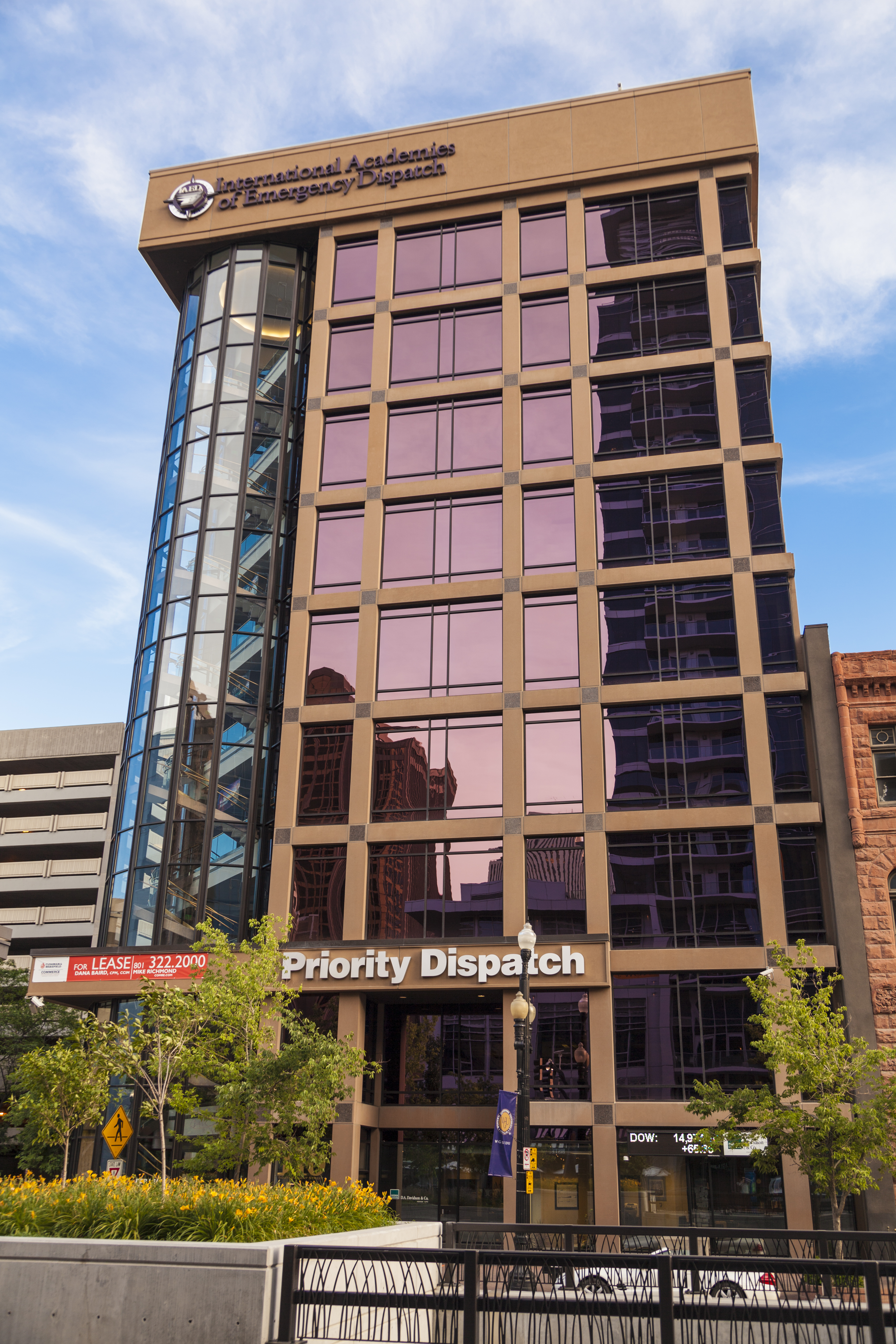
The former location of the Deseret News on Regent Street. The newspaper's logotype was carved into the top of the building's façade (since filled in by its new tenant) to give the building the appearance of the newspaper.

The newspaper moved into its newly constructed headquarters on Regent Street downtown Salt Lake City in 1997.

==== Competition with The Salt Lake Tribune ====
As the twentieth century ended, the Deseret News found itself embroiled in a contentious and often public battle with The Salt Lake Tribune, centered around the terms of their joint operating agreement, the desire of the Deseret News to switch from afternoon to morning publication, and ownership changes at the Tribune. The battle was resolved with the 2000 sale of the Tribune and with the Deseret News switching to morning publication and changing its name on June 9, 2003, to the Deseret Morning News.

=== Digital era ===
==== 1990s ====
On January 26, 1995, the Deseret News launched the Crossroads Information Network, allowing subscribers to access the News digitally through their dial-up service; digital-only subscriptions were also created. Installation of the Crossroads software—which was mailed on floppy disk to each subscriber beginning in February 1995—was required on each user's computer. The network also allowed users to access the paper's complete text along with archives back to April 1988, the Church News and the LDS Church Almanac. The software allowed subscribers to communicate with each other through an email-like system. Eventually the Crossroads Information Network was shut down and its features were moved to DesNews.com, which itself was replaced with DeseretNews.com.

The paper's first website, DesNews.com, was launched on September 27, 1995. This allowed News content to be accessed through an internet website, rather than the software required by Crossroads. The website was meant for those outside the Salt Lake area, who had to pay long-distance calling charges when dialed into the Crossroads network.

==== 2000s ====
On April 13, 2008, Joseph A. Cannon announced in a front page editor's note that the name of the newspaper had been changed back to the Deseret News, although the News would continue to be published in the morning.

==== 2010s ====
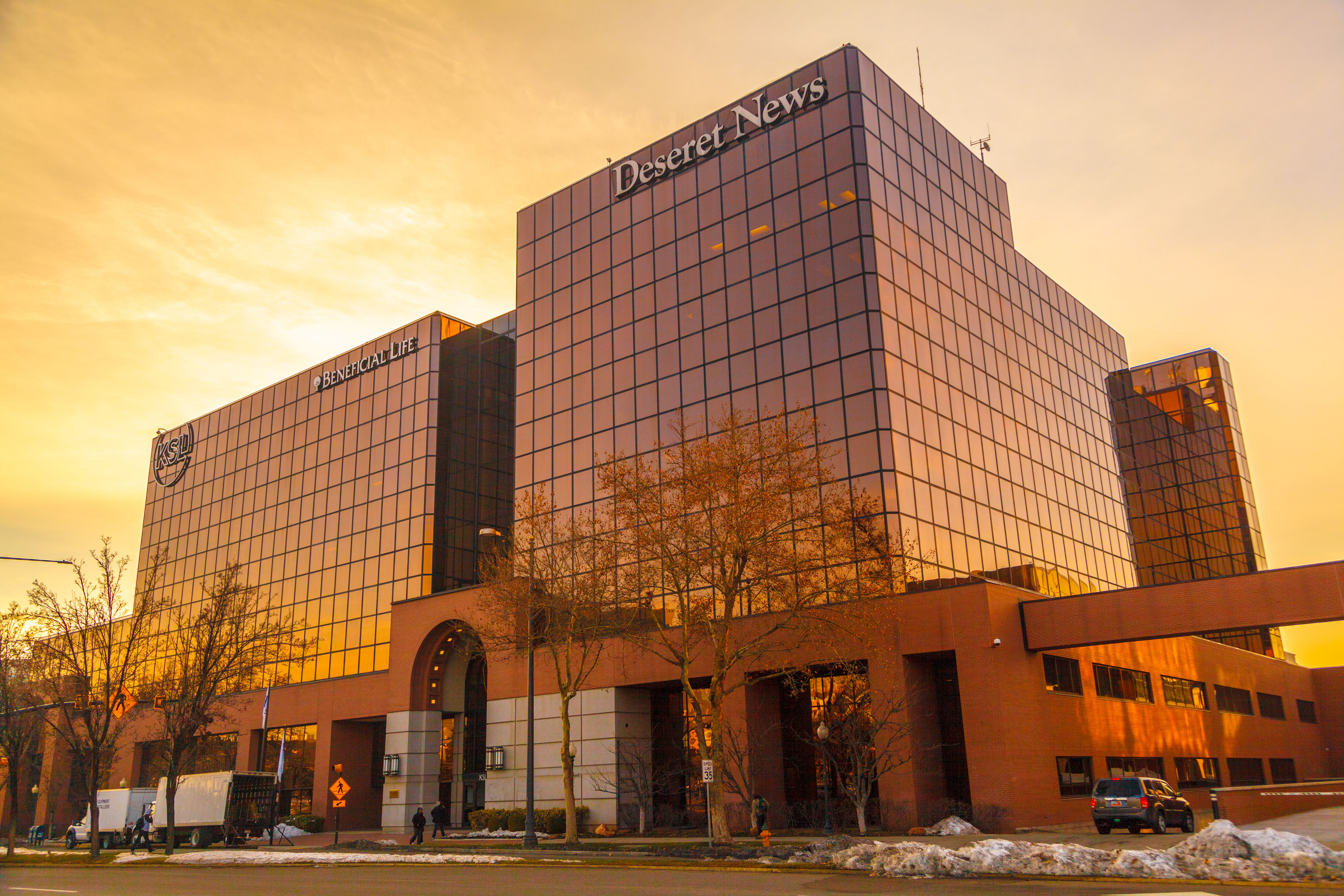
The Triad Center in Downtown Salt Lake City, current home of the News

In 2010, the Deseret News moved its offices out of the Deseret News Building on Regent Street to the broadcast house at the Triad Center, in order to integrate with KSL's newsroom.

In 2011, the weekly National Edition of the paper was introduced. Originally available only outside of Utah as a bundle with the Church News and within Utah as an insert for other local newspapers or at the church's Institutes of Religion; subscriptions inside Utah became available in 2014.

In November 2016, Doug Wilks became the editor of the Deseret News.

In October 2016, breaking an 80-year tradition of staying out of U.S. presidential politics, the Deseret News editorial board urged Donald Trump to resign his candidacy.

==== 2020s ====
In October 2020, the Deseret News and The Salt Lake Tribune announced the dissolution of their decades-long Joint Operating Agreement to share printing facilities. With the end of the agreement, both publications were free to contract printing needs with third parties and chart their futures independent of each other. After the dissolution became apparent, the Deseret News made the decision to end its daily print edition beginning January 1, 2021 (after just over 153 years of daily publication). The daily print edition was replaced with a new weekly local edition and the company would continue to print the weekly national edition, Church News, and introduce the Deseret Magazine.

In December 2020, the Deseret News editorial board again broke political neutrality by denouncing Utah Attorney General Sean Reyes's decision to support a lawsuit requesting that the US Supreme Court withhold the certified vote count from four states following the 2020 presidential election.

In 2021, Utah's Senator Mike Lee demanded a retraction after a statement attributed to him (regarding a phone call held during the January 6 United States Capitol attack), and published in the Deseret News on January 7, 2021, was brought up during the second impeachment trial of Donald Trump.

Starting March 23, 2022, the Deseret News increased publication of the local edition from once to twice a week. However, due to increasing paper and postage costs, the paper discontinued the midweek local edition printing, reverting to publication only once a week in mid-February 2026.

== Products ==
=== Deseret News website and app ===
The paper's first website, DesNews.com, was launched on September 27, 1995. The domain was later changed to DeseretNews.com, and changed again in August 2019 to Deseret.com.

The Deseret News launched native iOS apps in December 2011. An Android version of the app was later released for the Google Play Store.

=== Deseret News Local Edition ===
The Deseret News Local Edition is published once a week.

=== Deseret News National Edition ===
The Deseret News National Edition is a national weekly print paper concentrating its reporting and feature articles on areas including family, faith, education, and other values core to the LDS faith. It is available for delivery throughout the United States.

=== Deseret Magazine ===
The Deseret News launched its monthly magazine in 2021, which publishes ten times a year with a double issue in July/August and January/February. The magazine covers the people and culture of the Deseret region (from the Sierras to the Rockies, from the border of Mexico to the Pacific Northwest) and its intersection with the broader world. It includes essays on politics, culture, and faith from local and national thought leaders as well as other narratives and profiles.

== Coverage of faith ==
In addition to coverage of Utah and the broader region, the Deseret News also publishes content under its "Faith" section that features stories related to religion, churches and places of worship, and topics that intersect with faith such as Supreme Court rulings and religious education. These topics cover the breadth of beliefs across the United States, including but not limited to the LDS Church. Previously, content under the "Faith" section included only news unrelated to the LDS Church, with news related to the LDS Church covered by Mormon Times.

=== Church News ===
The Deseret News also publishes a weekly compact-sized insert, the Church News. The Church News includes news of the LDS Church and has been published since 1931. From 1974 to 2013, the Deseret News also published the Church Almanac, an annual edition carrying LDS Church facts and statistics edited by Church News staff.

=== Of Good Report / Mormon Times ===
Mormon Times was created as a publication with its own independent circulation base and also as the Religion section of the Deseret News in January 2008.

On October 3, 2010, following the success of the Mormon Times in print and online, a TV series premiered summarizing stories from the print version of the Mormon Times, along with interviews, hosted by Michelle King. The show has since ended.

In July 2011, the Deseret News's religion section was renamed "Faith", with the Mormon Times label applying only to its LDS-themed content. Since then, the Mormon Times has been retired as a publication, with all content related to religion of all faiths publishing under the "Faith" section of the Deseret News.

On August 7, 2020, following adjustments to LDS Church name use established in 2018 to stop using terms like "Mormon", etc., Mormon Times changed its name to Of Good Report. Its content is currently exclusive to social media.

== Organization ==
=== News staff ===
The newspaper's editors included the following:

- 1850–1854: Willard Richards
- 1854–1859: Albert Carrington
- 1859–1863: Elias Smith
- 1863–1867: Albert Carrington
- 1867–1873: George Q. Cannon
- 1873–1877: David O. Calder
- 1877–1879: George Q. Cannon
- 1880–1892: Charles W. Penrose
  1884–1885: John Nicholson, George C. Lambert (acting, during absence of Penrose)
- 1892–1898: John Q. Cannon
- 1898–1899: Janne M. Sjödahl
- 1899–1907: Charles W. Penrose
- 1907–1914: Janne M. Sjödahl
- 1914–1917: E. Leroy Bourne
- 1919–1922: John Q. Cannon
- 1922–1928: Harold Goff
- 1928: Alexander Buchanan, Jr.
- 1928–1931: John Q. Cannon
- 1931–1934: Joseph J. Cannon
- 1934–1943: James A. Langton
- 1943–1946: David A. Robinson
- 1946–1952: Mark E. Petersen
- 1952–1964: O. Preston Robinson
- 1964–1972: E. Earl Hawkes
- 1972–1986: William B. Smart
- 1985–1996: William James Mortimer
- 1997–2006: John Hughes
- 2007–2010: Joseph A. Cannon
- 2011–2016: Paul S. Edwards
- 2016–present: Doug Wilks

Among those who have served as publisher of the Deseret News include Wendell J. Ashton (1978–85), William James Mortimer (1985–2000), Jim Wall, Chris Lee, Jeff Simpson, Robin Ritch (2021–2023), and Burke Olsen (2023–present).

In the 1972–1986 period when Smart was the editor, Gordon B. Hinckley and Thomas S. Monson were among the presidents of the Deseret News Publishing Company.

==== 2010 restructuring ====
Summer 2010 saw multiple changes both in leadership and structure at the Deseret News. A new Opinion Editor, Paul S. Edwards, was appointed. Edwards had previously been provost at Southern Virginia University and earlier a political science professor at Brigham Young University (BYU). Editor Joe Cannon and publisher Jim Wall stepped down.

During the summer of 2010, it was announced that the Deseret News for the first time ever would have a president and CEO; Clark Gilbert was appointed to this position. He was already CEO of Deseret Digital Media. Gilbert announced the future of Deseret News was leaner, and more online. In August 2010, he announced the layoffs of 85 staffers, 57 full-time and 28 part-time. It resulted in a reduction of 43% of the paper's entire staff.

The Deseret News also created an editorial advisory board to work with Gilbert and Edwards; it consisted of people with a broad variety of backgrounds:

- Joseph Cannon, who had up until that time been the Deseret News editor.
- Pamela Atkinson, a Presbyterian philanthropist based in Salt Lake City
- Clayton M. Christensen, a professor of Business Administration at Harvard Business School.
- Sheri L. Dew, LDS author and president/CEO of Deseret Book, in Salt Lake City, Utah.
- Robert P. George, past chairman of the National Organization For Marriage, McCormick Professor of Jurisprudence at Princeton University and prominent conservative Christian thinker.
- Matthew S. Holland, president of Utah Valley University (UVU) in Orem, Utah; son of Jeffrey R. Holland, LDS apostle.
- Firoz "King" Hussein, CEO of Span Construction and Engineering a native of India who did graduate studies at BYU, is a convert to the LDS Church
- Jane Clayson Johnson, Emmy-winning journalist and author.
- Jeffrey Max Jones, former senator and cabinet minister in Mexico
- Mary McConnell, curriculum consultant at Juan Diego Catholic High School in Draper, Utah, former Rhodes scholar and speech-writer for Caspar Weinberger
- Michael W. McConnell, former federal judge, current professor at Stanford Law School
- Gordon H. Smith, former US Senator
- Hannah Clayson Smith, lawyer with the Becket Fund, Princeton University and BYU Law School graduate, former clerk for Supreme Court Justices Alito and Thomas
- Catherine Stokes, former deputy director of the Illinois Department of Health, an African American from Chicago, graduate of DePaul University and long-time member of the LDS Church and Utah resident since 2006, active with the Utah Chapter of the African-American Genealogical and Historical Society

=== Recognition ===
The Deseret News reporter Robert Mullins won a Pulitzer Prize in 1962 for local reporting "for his resourceful coverage of a murder and kidnapping at Dead Horse Point State Park".

== See also ==
- List of newspapers in Utah
