= Ebensee concentration camp =

Sub-camp of Mauthausen concentration camp (1943–1945)

Coordinates: 47°47′15″N 13°45′28″E

- Concentration camp
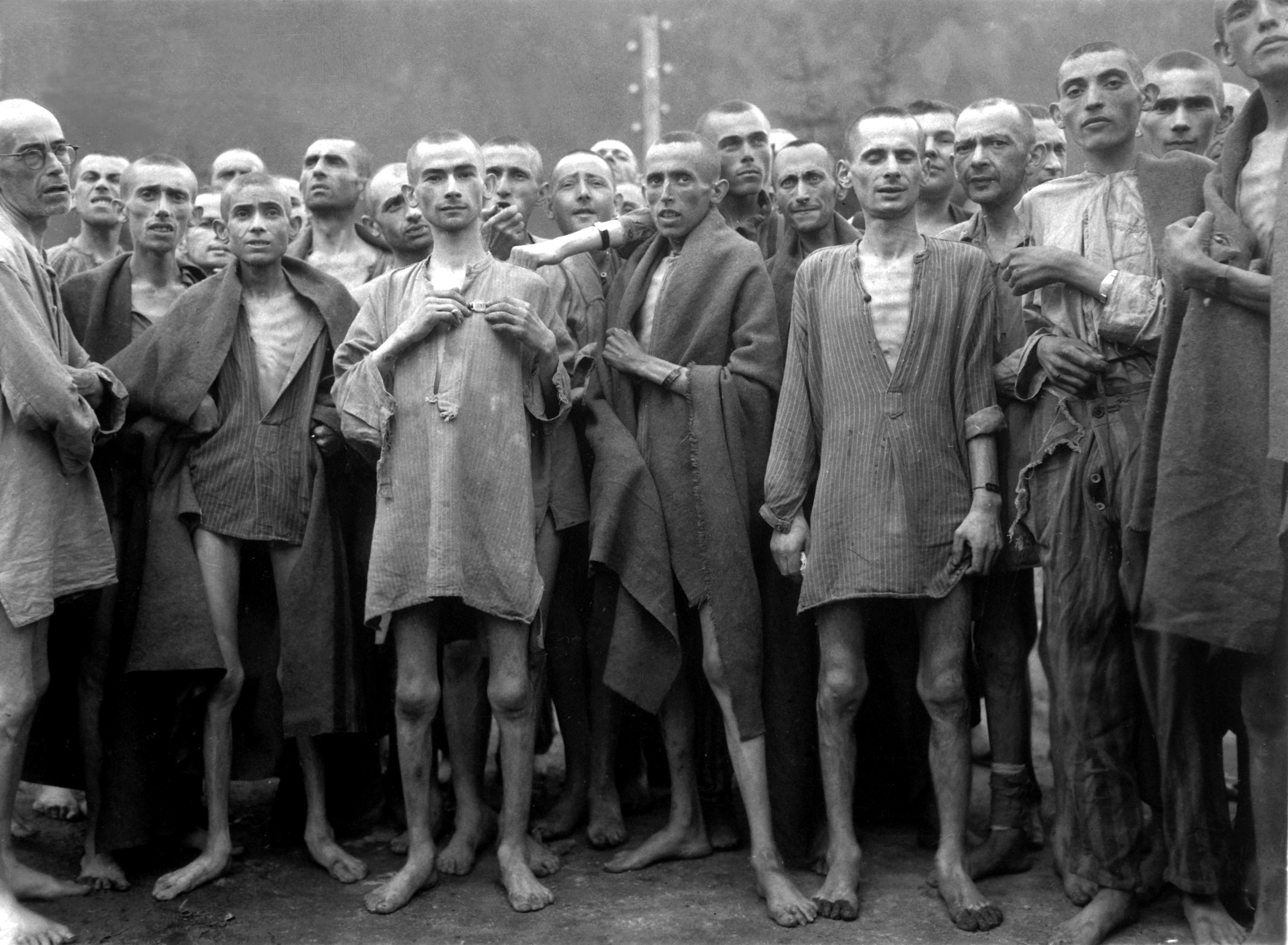
- Inmates of Ebensee concentration camp after their liberation by American troops on 6 May 1945

- Location of Ebensee in Austria
- Other names: Kalk, Kalksteinbergwerk, Solvay, Zement
- Operated by: DEST cartel and the Nazi Schutzstaffel (SS)
- Commandant: Georg Bachmayer; Otto Riemer
- Operational: November 1943 – May 1945
- Inmates: Political prisoners from many countries, Jews
- Number of inmates: about 27,000
- Killed: between 8,500 and 11,000 (estimated)
- Liberated by: US Army, 6 May 1945

Ebensee was a subcamp of Mauthausen concentration camp established by the SS to build tunnels for armaments storage near the town of Ebensee, Austria, in 1943. The camp held a total of 27,278 male inmates from 1943 until 1945. Between 8,500 and 11,000 prisoners died in the camp, mostly from hunger or malnutrition. Political prisoners were most common, and prisoners came from many different countries. Conditions were poor, and along with the lack of food, exposure to cold weather and forced hard labor made survival difficult. American troops of the 3rd Cavalry Reconnaissance Squadron liberated the camp on 6 May 1945; the 80th Infantry Division helped with the full liberation.

Residential homes now exist on the site of the camp, and a memorial cemetery is nearby. A memorial tunnel, created in 1994, and the Museum for Contemporary History Ebensee, created in 2001, provide information about the camp to visitors.

== Formation ==
The construction of the Ebensee subcamp began late in 1943, and the first prisoners arrived on 18 November 1943 from the main camp of Mauthausen and its subcamps. The main purpose of Ebensee was to provide slave labor for the construction of enormous tunnels in which armament works were to be housed, safe from bombing. One tunnel was used as a petroleum refinery. The SS used several codenames: Kalk (English: limestone), Kalksteinbergwerk (English: limestone mine), Solvay and Zement (English: cement) to conceal the true nature of the camp.

27,278 male inmates were sent to Ebensee. Between 8,500 and 11,000 died in the camp. Jews formed about one-third of the inmates. Inmates were from more than 20 different national origins, including countries like Russia, Poland, Czechoslovakia, Hungary, Germany, Yugoslavia, France, Italy, Greece and Spain. Romani people were also imprisoned. Most were political prisoners. Mauthausen received the harshest classification of concentration camp after Heydrich decreed that they be classified in 1941. The mortality rate in camps in the Mauthausen group was three times higher than that of other groups.

Georg Bachmeier was the camp's first commander for a few weeks. Anton Bentele or Bendele was the next camp commander, until the start of 1944, when SS Obersturmführer Otto Riemer became camp commander. Prisoner accounts report that Riemer beat, tortured, and murdered prisoners. After shooting some eight prisoners while drunk, Riemer was demoted and transferred to the Gusen concentration camp post office. Anton Ganz replaced him. One surviving prisoner described Ganz as "brutal, arbitrary, dictatorial and crude". Harrmann Pribill, an SS Unterscharführer, distributed work and determined work details.

== Conditions ==
First-hand testimony of Ebenesee survivor Max Moneta, born in Skała in 1926.

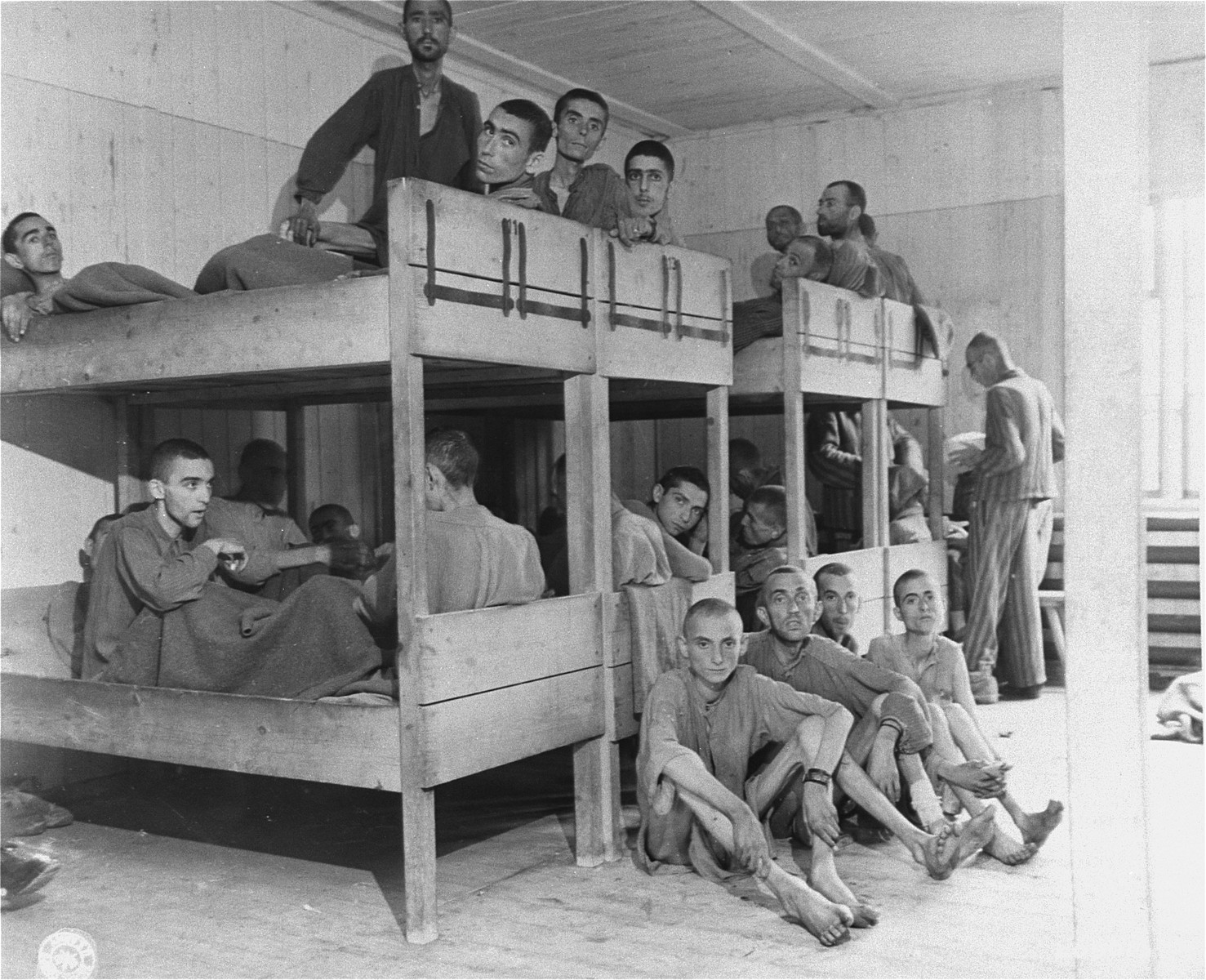
Jewish survivors at the infirmary of Ebensee

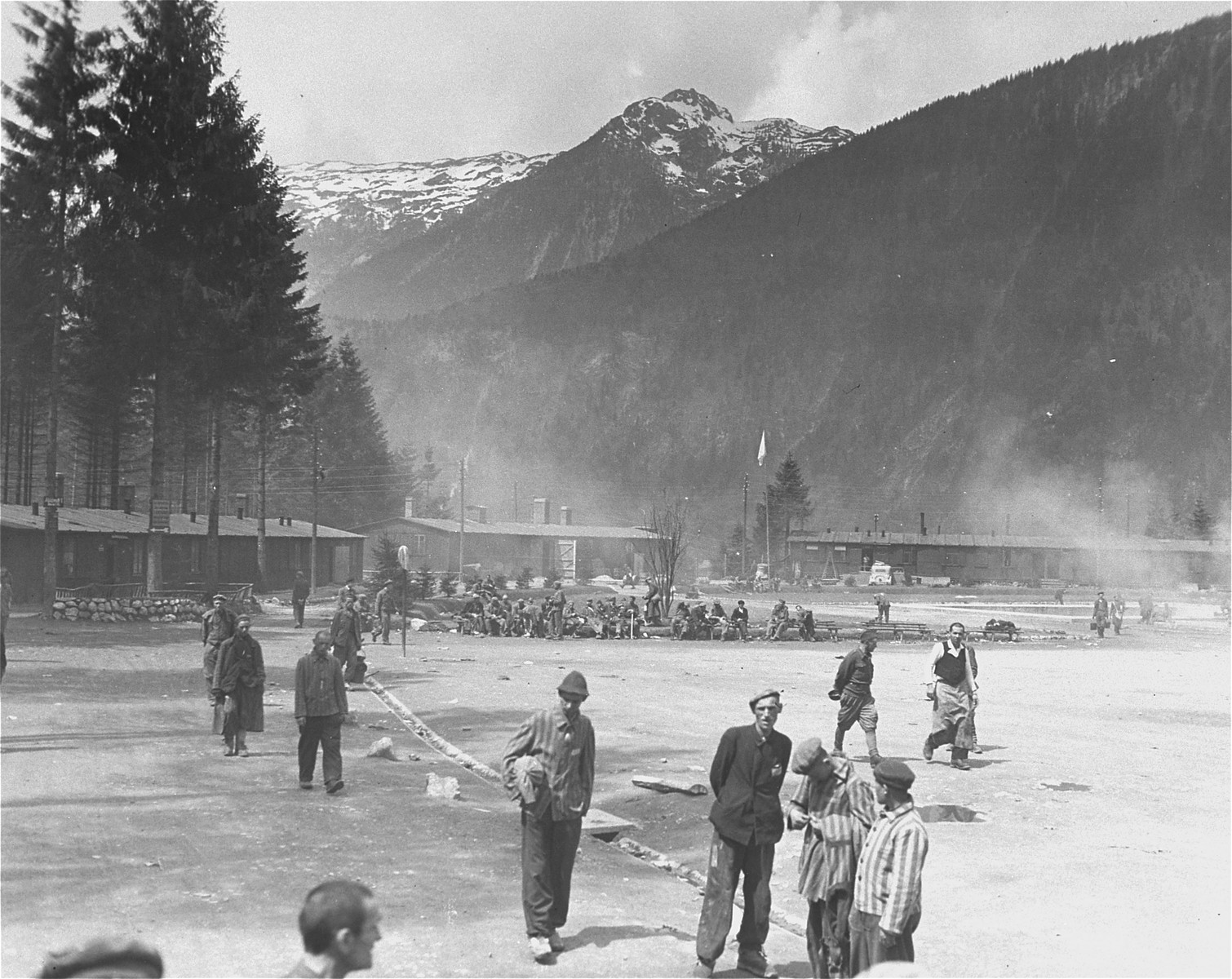
Former Appellplatz at Ebensee with survivors

Prisoners worked on 11-hour shifts unless they were working in the tunnels, when they worked in one of three 8-hour shifts. Lice infested the camp, and sawdust from mattresses caused prisoners to suffer. Food rations consisted of coffee for breakfast, hot water with spoiled potatoes for lunch, and a piece of bread with water for dinner. Prisoners were always hungry. Those who worked within the camp did not have to labor as strenuously as those assigned to work outside the camp. Many companies were employed to oversee the work on tunnel construction, including Dywidag, Hinteregger und Fischer, Stuag, Fohmann, Holzmann und Polensky, Wiener Brückenbau, Dr. Müller, Heckmann und Langen, Universale Bau AG., Rella & Co., Hofmann und Maculan, Walther, Grossdeutche Schachtbau, Fröhlich und Klüpfel, H. Koppers, Siemens Schukkert, Siemens Bauunion, Beton und Monierbau, Ferrobetonit, Latzel und Katscha, Swietelsky, Brandl, Roth, Hitler, and Herbsthofer. These companies provided civilian workers who each supervised several prisoners in the work. The SS, wanting to please the companies, sought to provide them with the number of prisoners they requested, even if those prisoners were dying. SS soldiers and appointed prisoners called Kapos also oversaw prisoners with varying degrees of brutality.

In an oral history interview, camp survivor Max Moneta reported that the barracks were not heated and that meals were irregular. There were no baths, and lice were common. Prisoners who worked the night shift were not allowed to sleep in the barracks during the day. Moneta said that fellow non-Jewish prisoners discriminated against Jewish prisoners. Former prisoner Serge de Moussac also remembers that Hungarian Jews had long working hours and were abused by Ganz. In the Jewish sick room in the camp, 1,503 Jewish prisoners were recorded. 95% died from "hunger and diseases resulting from malnutrition". While about a third of prisoners were constantly at the edge of starvation, a "high society" of 7-8% of prisoners worked in jobs inside the camp, had clothing, and extra opportunities to get food. Educated "political" prisoners were placed in administrative tasks, while criminal prisoners also had desirable positions in the prison's self-government. The death rate for Italian prisoners in Ebensee was 53%; after Mussolini's fall in 1943, Italians were marked as traitors. Jewish prisoners had a death rate of almost 40%. The nationality with the lowest death rate was Spanish, with a 0.9% death rate.

As allied forces closed in on Nazi territories, prisoners from other camps were sent to Ebensee, and there was not enough food to feed everyone. In May 1944, about 15% of prisoners were officially ill, but in May 1945, just before liberation, almost half of the prisoners were officially ill. Prisoner doctors and fellow Spanish prisoners working in medical supply depots smuggled additional food into the camp. From 1943 to 1944, many dangerously ill prisoners were transported back to Mauthausen. In June 1944, Jewish prisoners started to arrive. Beginning in 1945, thousands of prisoners from other concentration camps arrived in Ebensee. They were mostly Jewish. On 3 March 1945 over 2,000 Jewish prisoners arrived from the Wolfsberg sub-camp of Gross-Rosen. Commander Anton Ganz forced them to remain outside during snowy weather for almost two days, and hundreds of prisoners died of exhaustion caused by transport to the camp and of exposure. The following April, around 4,500 prisoners died. In May 1945, there were 18,500 inmates. After the many deaths in March and April, the crematorium could not cremate all the bodies, and Ganz ordered two secret mass graves to dispose of 2,167 dead bodies.

== Liberation ==
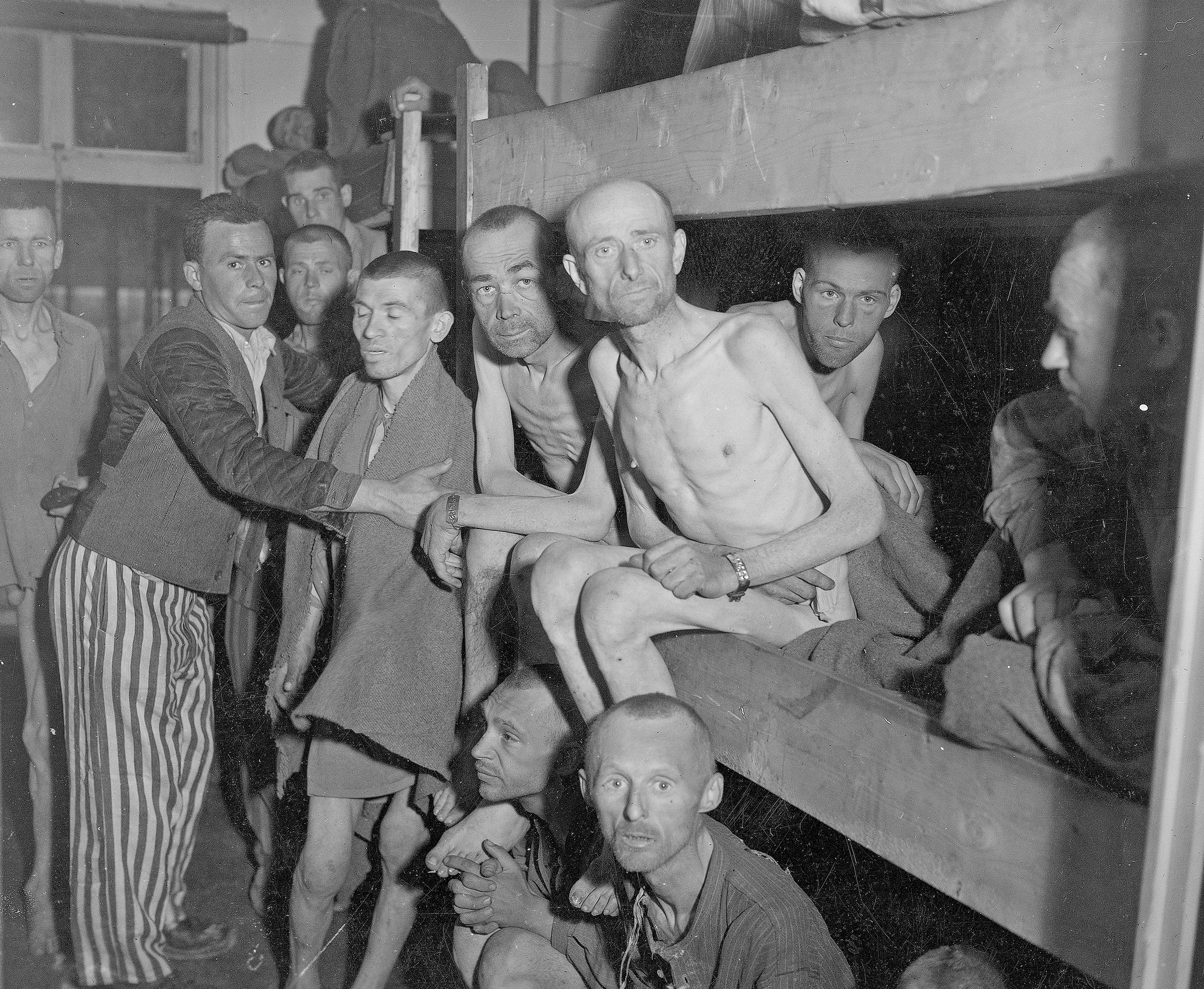
U.S. troops found the surviving prisoners at Ebensee crammed into disease-ridden, overcrowded barracks.

In May 1945, shooting in the distance could be heard from inside the camp, and there was a sense among prisoners that American and British forces were close at hand. On 4 May 1945 the commandant of the camp informed prisoners that they had been sold to the Americans and that they should seek shelter in the camp's tunnels for protection. Prisoners refused and remained in their barracks; hours later some of the tunnels exploded, reputedly due to the detonation of mines. On 5 May 1945, prisoners awoke to find that the SS had deserted Ebensee and that only elderly Germans armed with rifles were guarding the camp. Prisoners killed 52 camp functionaries who had collaborated with the SS to create the camp's hierarchy.

American troops of the 3rd Cavalry Reconnaissance Squadron arrived at the camp on 6 May 1945. Robert B. Persinger, a member of the platoon who liberated the camp, recalled that prisoners appeared to be starving and were barely clothed. A prisoner who spoke English, Max Garcia, showed the troops the stacks of bodies near the crematorium. After seeing the camp, American troops reported that 300 prisoners were dying of starvation every day. They requisitioned local food and made soup for the prisoners, but a few died from refeeding syndrome. The 80th Infantry Division helped complete liberation. On May 7, Lieutenant Colonel Marshall Wallach and Colonel James H. Polk visited the camp and ordered ration trucks to deliver food. U.S. Army Corps photographer J Malan Heslop took photographs that day.

Holocaust survivor and author Moshe Ha-Elion recalled that when the camp was liberated, the Polish inmates were singing the Polish hymn, the Greek inmates were singing the Greek hymn, and the French inmates were singing La Marseillaise. Afterwards, the Jewish inmates were singing Ha Tikvah. After liberation, over 735 prisoners died, and 1,000 stayed in hospitals for an extended period of time.

== Aftermath ==
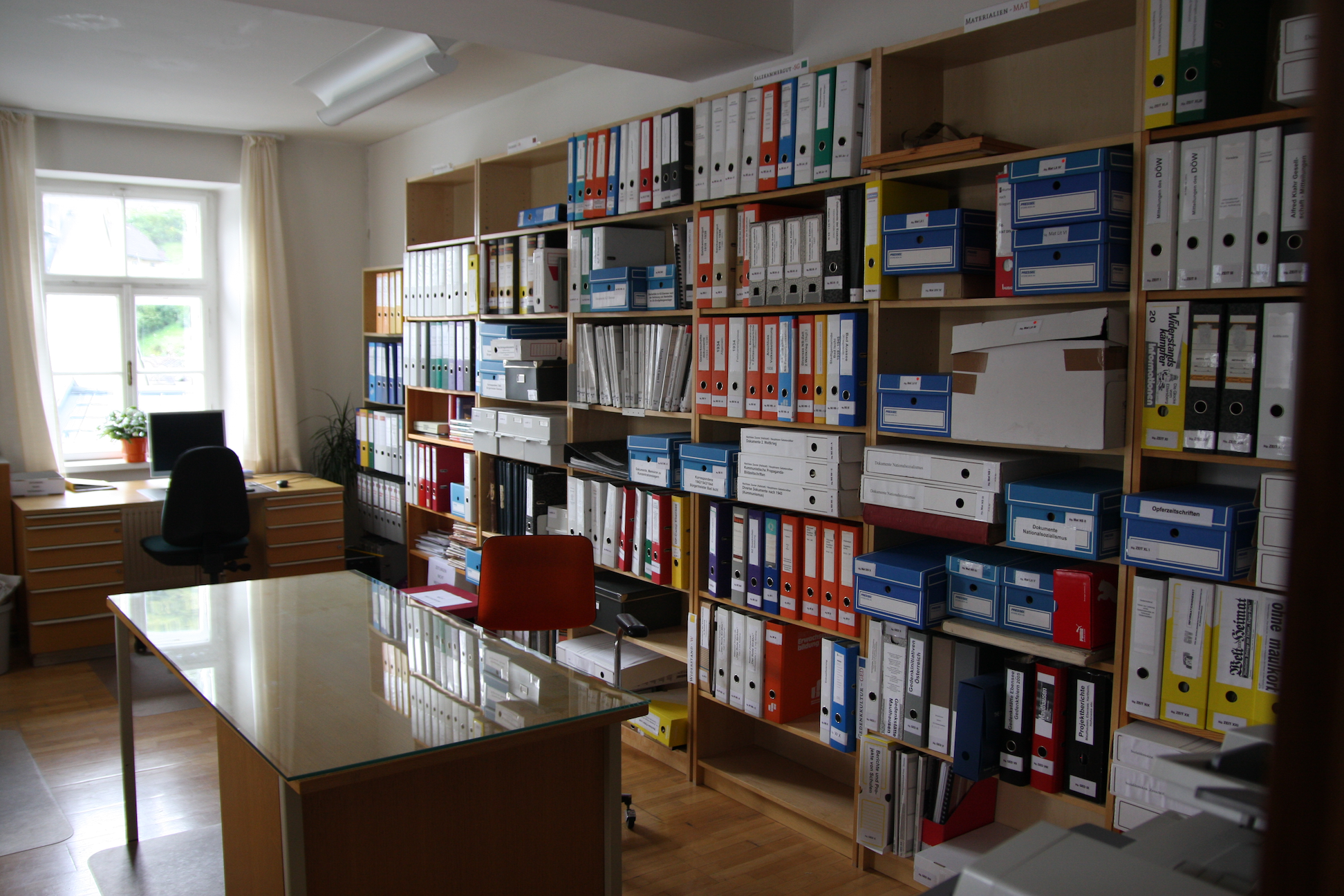
Archive room at Zeitgeschichte Museum und KZ-Gedenkstätte Ebensee, September 2010

In the immediate aftermath of liberation, survivors set up a cemetery for prisoners who died in the camp outside of Ebensee. In 1952, the cemetery was relocated nearer to the former location of the concentration camp, and about 4,000 victims are buried there. In 1946, residential homes were built on the site of the concentration camp. The Resistance Museum Ebensee Association created a memorial tunnel in 1994, where a display about the history of the camp existed since 1996. In 2001, the Museum for Contemporary History Ebensee opened and includes an archive with photos and the names of the prisoners in the camp. For many of the large satellite camps like Ebensee, memorialization is comparatively scant.
