= Taylor, Utah =

Unincorporated community in the state of Utah, United States

- Unincorporated community
- Location of Taylor within the State of Utah
- Coordinates: 41°13′38″N 112°05′01″W
- Country: United States
- State: Utah
- County: Weber
- Elevation: 4,239 ft (1,292 m)
- Time zone: UTC-7 (Mountain (MST))
  - Summer (DST): UTC-6 (MDT)
- ZIP code: 84401
- Area codes: 385, 801
- GNIS feature ID: 1437699

Taylor is an unincorporated community in western Weber County, Utah, United States, located approximately 3.5 miles (5.6 km) west of Ogden.

The community is part of the Weber School District and children from this community attend Kanesville Elementary, Haven Bay elementary Rocky Mountain Junior High, and West Field High School.

== Businesses ==
There are multiple small businesses in Taylor, these include

- UK kilts (ukkilts.com)
- Ogden bay produce
- The Celestial Grove (thecelestialgrove.com)
- Rasadoole Puppies (rasadoodlepuppies.com)
- Cloverside Goats
- Split mountain doodles (splitmountaindoodles.com)
