= Deseret News Publishing Company =

LDS owned company

- Industry: Publishing
- Predecessor: The Deseret News Company; Deseret News Publishing Company (1892-1898)
- Founded: Salt Lake City, Utah, U.S. (December 29, 1931)
- Founder: The Church of Jesus Christ of Latter-day Saints
- Area served: Salt Lake City metropolitan area
- Products: Deseret News; Church News
- Parent: Deseret Management Corporation

The Deseret News Publishing Company is a publishing company headquartered in Salt Lake City, Utah, United States. It is a subsidiary of Deseret Management Corporation (DMC), a holding company owned by the Corporation of the President of The Church of Jesus Christ of Latter-day Saints. The company publishes the Salt Lake City area newspaper, Deseret News, Deseret Magazine and the Church News. The company was incorporated in 1931 to direct the operations of the Deseret News, which until then was owned directly by the Church of Jesus Christ of Latter-day Saints (LDS Church). For many years the company operated a jobs press, known as the Deseret News Press, in which they used their presses to publish content for other publishers, such as Deseret Book.

== History ==
=== The News ===
The Deseret News, also referred to as the News, was first published on June 15, 1850, in Salt Lake City. The paper was started under the direction of LDS Church president Brigham Young, with Willard Richards as editor and "Truth and Liberty" as its motto. The News would start out as a weekly publication, but eventually semi-weekly and daily editions were added; all three were published concurrently until the weekly was ended in 1898. The semi-weekly was discontinued in 1922, and currently only the daily edition is published. Since its first issue the News has always been under the ownership of the LDS Church, but often held by various church owned companies; the first of which, The Deseret News Company, was incorporated on September 3, 1880. Because of financial troubles, The Deseret News Company leased the News along with the company's jobs press (printing and bookbinding), and merchandising—on October 1, 1892—to the Cannon family. The Cannon family formed a company to be the lessee of the News and called this company the Deseret News Publishing Company. But, the Cannon family was unable to make the paper financially sound, and the lease was returned to the church owned Deseret News Company on September 7, 1898 (and the first Deseret News Publishing Company was dissolved). Soon after the LDS Church took over direct ownership of the News and dissolved The Deseret News Company.

=== Incorporation ===
On December 29, 1931, the Deseret News Publishing Company was incorporated by the LDS Church. Its articles of incorporation, filed with the Salt Lake County Clerk, provided for 500 shares of stock, all retained by the church (with the exception of the qualifying directors' shares). This new company took over direct ownership and control of the News and its jobs press. In 1966, when DMC was formed as a holding company for the LDS Church's for-profit businesses, Deseret News Publishing became a subsidiary of DMC.

== Publications ==
=== Current ===
- Deseret News
- Church News
- Deseret Magazine

=== Former ===
- The Deseret News Consumer Analysis, annual Salt Lake City area consumer analysis
- 2002 Salt Lake City: Memorable Photographs and Stories from the Games of 2002
  - Sunday National Edition, formerly the Mormon Times
- OKespañol
- Deseret News Church Almanac

== Further read ==
- Ashton, Wendell J., (1950). Voice in the West: Biography of a Pioneer Newspaper, New York: Duell, Sloan and Pearce.
