= Church News =

Newspaper in Salt Lake City, Utah

- Church News print edition of April 18, 2026
- Type: Daily (online); Weekly (tabloid)
- Format: Tabloid
- Owner: Deseret News Publishing Company (Deseret Management Corporation)
- Editor: John Ryan Jensen
- Founded: April 4, 1931
- Headquarters: 50 N. 300 West; Salt Lake City, UT 84101; United States
- OCLC number: 11655569
- Website: www.thechurchnews.com

The Church News (formerly LDS Church News) is a multi-platform supplement and subdivision of the Deseret News, a Salt Lake City, Utah newspaper owned by the Church of Jesus Christ of Latter-day Saints (LDS Church). It is published daily online, and weekly as tabloid-sized. Deseret News also provides the news site Of Good Report (now only in social media and formerly Mormon Times). It is the only LDS Church publication entirely devoted to news coverage of church.

== Content ==
The Church News is the official newspaper of the LDS Church, publishing its "Authorized News." This is not to be confused with the "Mormon Times" branded coverage within the religion section of the Deseret News, which contains unofficial social and cultural news coverage about the church, though both are now distributed together to Church News subscribers. As with the Liahona, the LDS Church encourages its members to subscribe to the Church News, which gives its content an air of official endorsement.

The Church News does not carry advertisements in its pages, although it did in its first three issues and during 1959–60. Despite higher prices than in other Deseret News sections, Church News ad space didn't make enough money, and it was felt that it detracted from the religious paper's dignity. Instead, the section is financially supported by the rest of the Deseret News operations, and high volume subscriptions.

=== Features ===
A mainstay of the Church News is its continuing features that make up most of the paper. These include "This Week in Church History," "Message of Inspiration," "Living By the Scriptures," "A Thought From the Scriptures," and "Viewpoints." It also regularly carries announcements, such as upcoming events in "Calendar of Events," 70th wedding anniversaries in "Milestones of Togetherness," birthdays over 100 in "Centenarians," and deaths of prominent church members in "Obituaries." Announcements are posted of all new stake, mission, and temple presidents when they occur.

The Church News publishes semiannual issues on the LDS Church's general conferences, but only prints brief reports of the sermons and announcements, unlike the Liahona and Conference Report, other church publications which circulate later and print full transcripts.

=== Tone and coverage ===
The Church News' purpose has been stated to "build testimonies and uplift its readers." In doing this it focuses on inspirational and motivational stories in a graphics-heavy format. The paper isn't intended to cover controversial issues, but emphasizes success stories and reinforces the church message. Though it experimented with some "hard news" in the early 1970s, the paper has always stayed with its successful, uplifting formula and remained reverential toward church leaders. Some have nicknamed the paper "Mormon Pravda," because of its dedication to promoting faith, which others see as producing soft "human interest" stories.

Since the paper and the church are both based in Salt Lake City, much Church News coverage over the years has been Utah-centric, earning it the nickname "This Week in Utah" by some Australian readers. Its global focus has expanded as the paper attempts to showcase the church's international activities.

== History ==
Since the Deseret News was founded in 1850, it reported news of the LDS Church in its regular issues. Minutes of ward meetings were covered and sermons were often carried on the front page. In the 1890s, efforts to emphasize secular news pushed church coverage to dedicated sections on inside pages. As early as the mid-1850s and 1860s consideration was given to creating a separate church newspaper. In 1931, a new Saturday tabloid called the Church Section was released, which primarily reported leaders' sermons, church events, and notices about new bishoprics and stake presidencies. It was retitled as the Weekly Church Edition in 1942, and Church News in 1943, though the name remained in flux for the next few years. It was also in 1943 that circulation as an independent publication from the Deseret News began. In 1945, when Liahona The Elders' Journal (an LDS publication based in Independence, Missouri aimed at members and missionaries in the eastern and central United States) ended publication, it recommended that its subscribers began taking the Church News.

Starting in 1981, the Church News was retitled LDS Church News: News of the Church of Jesus Christ of Latter-day Saints, but today it is usually referred to as Church News or LDS Church News.

=== Distribution ===
In 1943, the paper became available through a special Saturday-only Deseret News subscription, which allowed the paper to eventually surpass the regular Deseret News circulation by 12,000. In 1948, the Church News was distributed as a separate publication by mail, to areas Deseret News circulation didn't cover, a practice that still continues. This allowed Church News circulation to increase to almost 250,000 in 1981, compared to the Deseret News at about 70,000. The paper was also distributed in an LDS serviceman's edition from 1944 to 1948 and by telegram from 1952 to 1953 For much of its history the Church News was available throughout the United States without a subscription to the Deseret News, except for residents of Utah who were required to subscribe to the Deseret News to receive the Church News. In 2014 the subscription model changed, allowing Utahns to subscribe to the less expensive weekly Deseret News National Edition and receive the Church News as an insert.

=== Features and format ===
Starting in 1948, large photos were used for each issue's cover. Gradually, more graphics and colors were used and regular features were added, such as editorials, "Gems of Thought," "The Missionary's Diary," "I Want to Know," and short historical or scriptural vignettes.

The editorials became one of the most noticeable features of the Church News. Longtime Deseret News editor and LDS Church apostle Mark E. Petersen wrote for the Church News since its 1931 beginning, and in 1943 started his own weekly editorial. In 1948, these moved to the back page, where they remained until Petersen died in 1984 and they were replaced by staff-written "Viewpoints." Because of his church authority and the paper's religious intent, it was unclear whether these editorials constituted official church positions. Petersen wrote on a variety of topics, including secular and controversial subjects like politics. In the 1970s, his editorials came out against the Equal Rights Amendment (ERA), which ended up establishing the LDS Church's position and changing modest LDS support for the amendment into firm opposition.

When former chief photographer of the Deseret News J M. Heslop became Editor of the Church News in 1969, he changed its format from dense text and statistics into a strongly visual showcase of his photography with short faith-promoting stories. During Heslop's editorship, the Church News used mail distribution to greatly expand circulation to over 200,000, vastly surpassing the 70,000 readers of its parent, the Deseret News.

In the early 1970s, the Church News began carrying historical sketches written by members of the LDS Church Historical Department. Around 1977, following high-profile criticisms of Historical Department work, the paper replaced these with staff-written "Vignettes of Faith" and avoided reviews of new major historical publications.

=== Internet ===
In 1995, the Church News went online, with subscription-only access, with archives available back to 1988. In 2008 the website was redesigned and free access was then granted to non-subscribers.

A cover in 2010

In 2014, the Church News website, LDSChurchNews.com, was moved to DeseretNews.com, to integrate with the technology improvements being made on the Deseret News website. At the time, an archives site was created at ldschurchnewsarchive.com.

=== Editors ===
No.	Name	Start	End	Notes
	James R. Kennard (acting)	1931	1931	Kennard was the Deseret News Saturday feature editor before the Church News had a full-time editor.
1	Henry A. Smith	1931	1968	Smith was the Deseret News' church editor before being appointed over the Church News in September. He served in this position for over 30 years, then was called to be the press secretary to the First Presidency.
	John R. Talmage, Conrad B. Harrison (acting)	1939	1940	Talmage and Harrison were editors while Smith temporarily served as wire editor for the Deseret News.
	Edwin O. Haroldsen, S. Perry Lee, Merwin G. Fairbanks (acting)	1956	1959	These men filled in for Smith while he was president of the Central Atlantic States Mission.
2	Jack E. Jarrard	1968	1969	Jarrard served for about a year before becoming a field correspondent.
3	J Malan Heslop	1969	1976	Heslop had been Deseret News chief photographer and was charged with improving Church News visual design.
4	Dell Van Orden	1976	1999	Van Orden had been Church News assistant editor, and carried on Heslop's efforts when Heslop became Deseret News managing editor.
5	Gerry Avant	1999	2017	Avant, associate editor since 1988, became the Church News' first female editor when Van Orden retired.
6	Sarah Jane Weaver	2017	2024	Weaver, associate editor since 1995, became the Church News' editor when Avant retired.
7	J. Ryan Jensen	2024	current	Jensen became the Church News editor when Sarah Jane Weaver was made editor of the Deseret News.

== Church Almanac ==
Continuing in the tradition of Mormon almanacs from the mid-nineteenth century, the Deseret News published the Deseret News Church Almanac (or just Church Almanac), composed of LDS Church facts and statistics edited and prepared by the staff of the Church News. The almanac started in 1974 as an annual publication, then became biennial in 1984, then annual again from 2002 to 2013.

With access to records and the LDS Church Historical Department, the almanac presented some material that was not available in other publications. It contained history and membership statistics of geographical areas for the year ending before the previous year (e.g., the 2009 almanac included data up to the year-end 2007). It also had brief biographies of all who had been leaders of the larger church and a summary of church news from the previous year. Each annual edition included features on a specific historical subject or period, often related to a church current event, such as the rebuilding of the Nauvoo Temple, the 2002 Salt Lake City Olympics, Joseph Smith's bicentennial birthday, the Mountain Meadows massacre sesquicentennial, or Gordon B. Hinckley's death.

In 2009, the almanac consolidated and modified most sections to improve design and dramatically reduce size. The new format included many more visuals, as well as expanded biographies of First Presidency members. State, province, and country history was supplemented with additional church area information. This local information returned in later editions.

The Deseret News has not published the almanac since the 2013 edition. With no further print editions planned, the Church News has begun to recreate it online.

== Sources ==
- Heslop, "J" Malan (1992). "Church News". Encyclopedia of Mormonism. Vol. 1. Macmillan Publishers.
- Swenson, Paul (Spring 1977). "Nostrums in the Newsroom: Raised Sights and Raised Expectations at the Deseret News". Dialogue: A Journal of Mormon Thought. 10 (3): 46–57. doi:10.2307/45224591. JSTOR 45224591. S2CID 254386573.
- Roberts, Paul T. (August 1983). "A History of the Development and Objectives of the LDS Church News Section of the Deseret News". [Master's Thesis]. Provo, Utah: Brigham Young University, Department of Communications. Archived from the original (PDF) on June 12, 2011.
