= William James Mortimer =

American newspaper publisher

William James Mortimer (died May 20, 2010), sometimes known as Jim Mortimer, was the publisher, president and editor of the Deseret News from 1985 to 1996 and publisher of the newspaper from 1996 to 2000.

== Biography ==
Mortimer graduated from Logan High School, received his bachelor's degree from Utah State University and journalism degree from Columbia University. After serving as a U.S. Army second lieutenant during the Korean War, he returned to Utah and married Paula Ann Deline.

Mortimer's first involvement with the Deseret News began at age 12 when he started as a carrier delivering the paper. He also worked part-time in the Logan bureau of the Deseret News during college. His career in printing and publishing started with the Deseret News in 1957 when he accepted a position as a reporter, then later became Assistant Business Editor. He then became Sales Manager at the Deseret News Press, then Senior Account Executive for Wheelwright Lithographing Company. He enjoyed 13 years at Deseret Book where he served as Vice President and General Manager for much of the 1970s. In 1979, Jim returned to the Deseret News Press. He was appointed Publisher, President and Editor of the Deseret News in 1985. His involvement with "Deseret" companies led to his appellation as "Deseret Jim." He retired in 2000.

He was very active in the community serving in many positions including president of the Printing Industries of Utah, a board member of Printing Industries of America, president of the Downtown Retail Merchants of Salt Lake, president of the Utah Retail Merchants Association, executive vice president of the Great Salt Lake Council Boy Scouts of America, chairman of Salt Lake Area Chamber of Commerce, chairman of the board at Pioneer Memorial Theatre, chairman of the Utah Partnership for Education and Economic Development, chairman of the board for Prevent Blindness Utah Chapter—now Friends for Sight, executive committee member for Salt Lake Convention and Visitors Bureau, board member of the Utah Symphony, president of the Salt Lake Kiwanis Club, lieutenant governor of Utah-Idaho District of Kiwanis International, president of Utah Press Association, board member of the Utah State University Alumni Association, chairman of Utah State University journalism department advisory board, an honorary colonel of Utah National Guard, and a member of the Guard’s executive board. He chaired the first United Way campaign to raise $1,000,000.

Awards included Distinguished Citizen of the Year 1995 for the Boy Scouts of America, an honorary Doctor of Humanities degree from Utah State University and election to the Utah Printer’s Hall of Fame in 2010 for his significant contribution to the printing industry.

Mortimer was an active member of The Church of Jesus Christ of Latter-day Saints Latter-day Saint. His callings in the LDS Church included a Regional Representative, a Stake Patriarch, Stake President, Bishop and Executive Secretary of the Youth Correlation Committee. He also served as secretary to the LDS Church Scriptures Publication Committee from 1972 to 1981. The members of the committee were Thomas S. Monson, Boyd K. Packer and Bruce R. McConkie. Mortimer was responsible for supervising the typesetting, printing and binding of the (then) new Latter-day Saint Edition of the King James version of the Bible and the new triple combination.

Mortimer died in Salt Lake City at age 77 on May 20, 2010, after a long illness. He was survived by his wife and seven children.
