= James Mortimer (dogshow judge) =

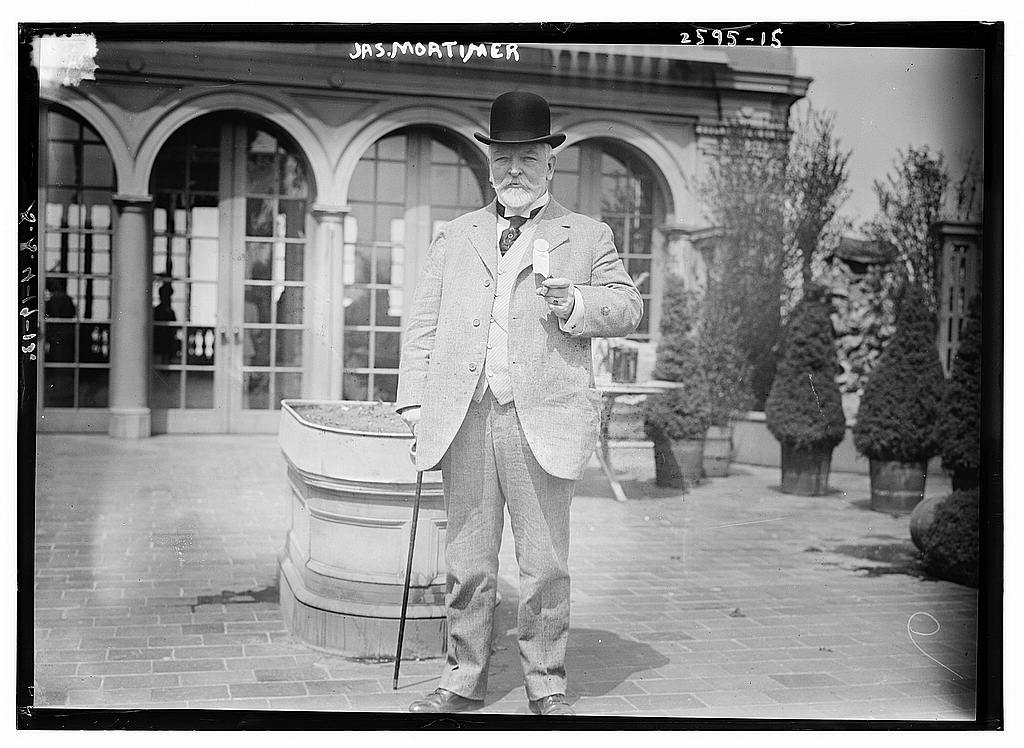
James Mortimer c. 1910–1913

James Mortimer (1842 – 14 September 1915) was a dog show judge and bench show superintendent.

He was born in Crediton in Devon, England.

== Legacy ==
- James Mortimer Memorial Trophy
