= Alternative medicine =

Unscientific healthcare practices

- AM, complementary and alternative medicine (CAM), complementary medicine, heterodox medicine, integrative medicine (IM), complementary and integrative medicine (CIM), functional medicine (FM), new-age medicine, pseudomedicine, unconventional medicine, unorthodox medicine, altmed
- Claims: Alternatives to science-based medicine

Alternative medicine comprises practices that aim to achieve the healing effects of medicine, but that lack biological plausibility, testability, repeatability, or supporting evidence of effectiveness. Such practices are not part of mainstream (Note: "The phrase complementary and alternative medicine is used to describe a group of diverse medical and health care systems, practices, and products that have historic origins outside mainstream medicine. Most of these practices are used together with conventional therapies and therefore have been called complementary to distinguish them from alternative practices, those used as a substitute for standard care. ... Until a decade ago or so, 'complementary and alternative medicine' could be defined as practices that are neither taught in medical schools nor reimbursed, but this definition is no longer workable, since medical students increasingly seek and receive some instruction about complementary health practices, and some practices are reimbursed by third-party payers. Another definition, practices that lack an evidence base, is also not useful, since there is a growing body of research on some of these modalities, and some aspects of standard care do not have a strong evidence base.") (Note: "An alternative medical system is a set of practices based on a philosophy different from Western biomedicine.") evidence-based medicine. Unlike modern medicine, which employs the scientific method to test plausible therapies by way of responsible and ethical clinical trials, producing repeatable evidence of either effect or of no effect, alternative therapies are not products of the scientific method, but instead rely on testimonials, anecdotes, religion, tradition, superstition, belief in supernatural "energies", pseudoscience, errors in reasoning, propaganda, fraud, or other unscientific sources. Alternative medicine practices are also called New Age medicine, pseudo-medicine, unorthodox medicine, holistic medicine, fringe medicine, functional medicine, and unconventional medicine, with little distinction from quackery.

Some alternative practices are based on theories that contradict the established science of how the human body works; others appeal to the supernatural or superstitions to explain their effect or lack thereof. In others, the practice has plausibility but lacks a positive risk–benefit outcome probability. Research into alternative therapies often fails to follow proper research protocols (such as placebo-controlled trials, blind experiments and calculation of prior probability), providing invalid results. History has shown that if a method is proven to work, it eventually ceases to be alternative and becomes mainstream medicine.

Much of the perceived effect of an alternative practice arises from a belief that it will be effective, the placebo effect, or from the treated condition resolving on its own (the natural course of disease). This is further exacerbated by the tendency to turn to alternative therapies upon the failure of medicine, at which point the condition will be at its worst and most likely to spontaneously improve. In the absence of this bias, especially for diseases that are not expected to get better by themselves such as cancer or HIV infection, multiple studies have shown significantly worse outcomes if patients turn to alternative therapies. While this may be because these patients avoid effective treatment, some alternative therapies are actively harmful (such as cyanide poisoning from amygdalin, or the intentional ingestion of hydrogen peroxide) or actively interfere with effective treatments.

The alternative medicine sector is a highly profitable industry with a strong lobby, and faces far less regulation over the use and marketing of unproven treatments. Complementary medicine (CM), complementary and alternative medicine (CAM), functional medicine (FM), integrated medicine or integrative medicine (IM), and holistic medicine attempt to combine alternative practices with those of mainstream medicine. Traditional medicine practices become "alternative" when used outside their original settings and without proper scientific explanation and evidence. Alternative methods are often marketed as more "natural" or "holistic" than methods offered by medical science, that is sometimes derogatorily called "Big Pharma" by supporters of alternative medicine. Billions of dollars have been spent studying alternative medicine, with few or no positive results and many methods thoroughly disproven.

== Definitions and terminology ==
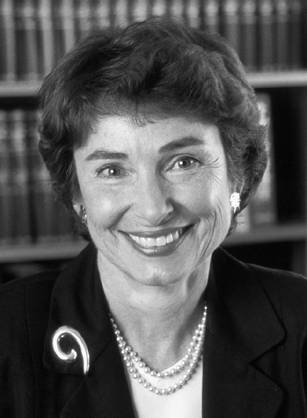
Marcia Angell: "There cannot be two kinds of medicine – conventional and alternative."

The terms alternative medicine, complementary medicine, integrative medicine, holistic medicine, natural medicine, unorthodox medicine, fringe medicine, unconventional medicine, and new age medicine are used interchangeably as having the same meaning and are almost synonymous in most contexts. Terminology has shifted over time, reflecting the preferred branding of practitioners. For example, the department of the United States National Institutes of Health studying alternative medicine is currently named the National Center for Complementary and Integrative Health (NCCIH), but it was established as the Office of Alternative Medicine (OAM) and then renamed the National Center for Complementary and Alternative Medicine (NCCAM) before now. Therapies are often framed as "natural" or "holistic", implicitly and intentionally suggesting that conventional medicine is "artificial" and "narrow in scope".

The meaning of the term "alternative" in the expression "alternative medicine", is not that it is an effective alternative to medical science (though some alternative medicine promoters may use the loose terminology to give the appearance of effectiveness). Loose terminology may also be used to suggest meaning that a dichotomy exists when it does not (such as the use of the expressions Western medicine and Eastern medicine to suggest a cultural difference between the Asian east and the European west, rather than that the difference is between evidence-based medicine and treatments that do not work).

=== Alternative medicine ===
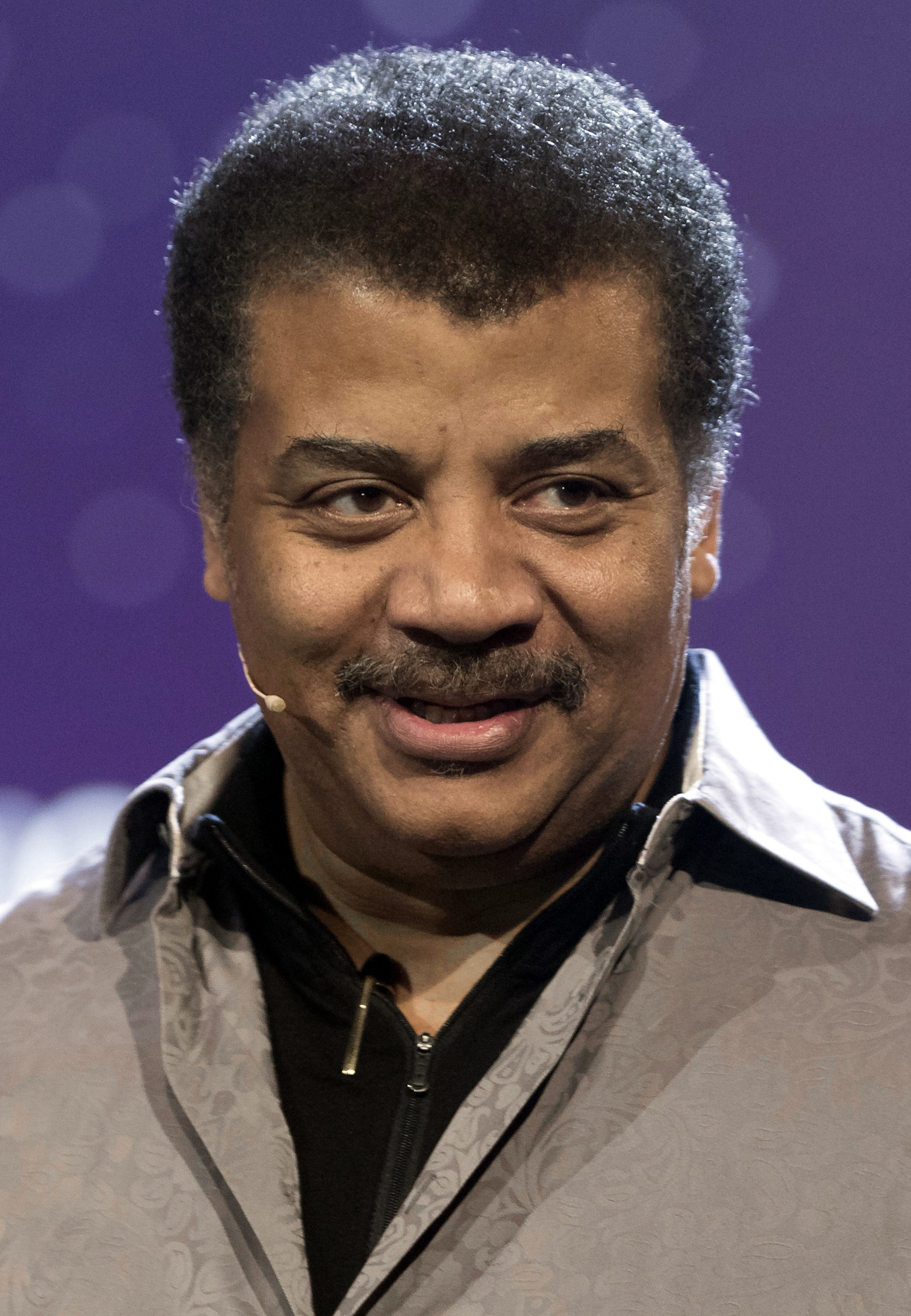
Neil deGrasse Tyson: Q: What do you call Alternative Medicine that survives double-blind laboratory tests? A: Regular Medicine.

Alternative medicine is defined loosely as a set of products, practices, and theories that are believed or perceived by their users to have the healing effects of medicine, (Note: "[A]lternative medicine refers to all treatments that have not been proven effective using scientific methods.") (Note: "Complementary and alternative medicine (CAM) is a broad domain of resources that encompasses health systems, modalities, and practices and their accompanying theories and beliefs, other than those intrinsic to the dominant health system of a particular society or culture in a given historical period. CAM includes such resources perceived by their users as associated with positive health outcomes. Boundaries within CAM and between the CAM domain and the domain of the dominant system are not always sharp or fixed.") but whose effectiveness has not been established using scientific methods, (Note: "It is time for the scientific community to stop giving alternative medicine a free ride. There cannot be two kinds of medicine – conventional and alternative. There is only medicine that has been adequately tested and medicine that has not, medicine that works and medicine that may or may not work ... speculation, and testimonials do not substitute for evidence.") or whose theory and practice is not part of biomedicine, (Note: "CAM is a group of diverse medical and health care systems, practices, and products that are not generally considered part of conventional medicine.") or whose theories or practices are directly contradicted by scientific evidence or scientific principles used in biomedicine. "Biomedicine" or "medicine" is that part of medical science that applies principles of biology, physiology, molecular biology, biophysics, and other natural sciences to clinical practice, using scientific methods to establish the effectiveness of that practice. Unlike medicine, an alternative product or practice does not originate from using scientific methods, but may instead be based on hearsay, religion, tradition, superstition, belief in supernatural energies, pseudoscience, errors in reasoning, propaganda, fraud, or other unscientific sources.

Some other definitions seek to specify alternative medicine in terms of its social and political marginality to mainstream healthcare. This can refer to the lack of support that alternative therapies receive from medical scientists regarding access to research funding, sympathetic coverage in the medical press, or inclusion in the standard medical curriculum. For example, a widely used definition devised by the National Center for Complementary and Alternative Medicine (NCCIH) calls it "a group of diverse medical and health care systems, practices, and products that are not generally considered part of conventional medicine". However, these descriptive definitions are inadequate in the present-day when some conventional doctors offer alternative medical treatments and introductory courses or modules can be offered as part of standard undergraduate medical training; alternative medicine is taught in more than half of US medical schools and US health insurers are increasingly willing to provide reimbursement for alternative therapies.

=== Complementary or integrative medicine ===
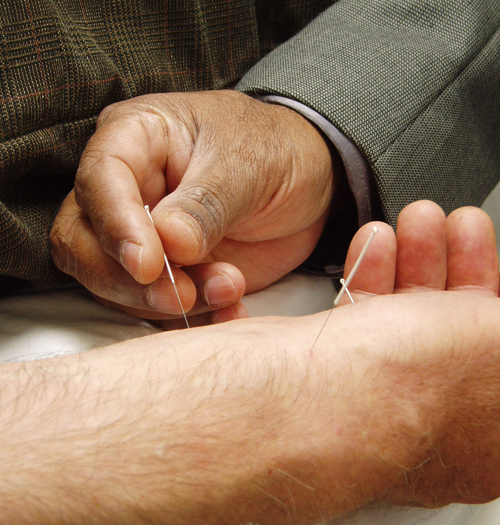
Acupuncture involves insertion of needles in the body.

Complementary medicine (CM) or integrative medicine (IM) is when alternative medicine is used together with mainstream medical treatment in a belief that it improves the effect of treatments. (Note: The Final Report (2002) of the White House Commission on Complementary and Alternative Medicine Policy states: "The Commissioners believe and have repeatedly stated in this Report that our response should be to hold all systems of health and healing, including conventional and CAM, to the same rigorous standards of good science and health services research. Although the Commissioners support the provision of the most accurate information about the state of the science of all CAM modalities, they believe that it is premature to advocate the wide implementation and reimbursement of CAM modalities that are yet unproven.") Several medical organizations differentiate between complementary and alternative medicine including the UK National Health Service (NHS), Cancer Research UK, and the US Center for Disease Control and Prevention (CDC), the latter of which states that "Complementary medicine is used in addition to standard treatments" whereas "Alternative medicine is used instead of standard treatments." For example, acupuncture (piercing the body with needles to influence the flow of energy) might be believed to increase the effectiveness or "complement" science-based medicine when used at the same time. Significant drug interactions caused by alternative therapies may make treatments less effective, notably in cancer therapy.

Some mainstream academic medical centers have integrative or functional medicine departments, including the Cleveland Clinic, the Mayo Clinic, Stanford University, UCLA, UC San Francisco and Northwestern University. In contrast, other medical practitioners are unconvinced by these practices. For example, surgical oncologist, David Gorski has described integrative medicine as an attempt to bring pseudoscience into academic science-based medicine with skeptics such as Gorski and David Colquhoun referring to this with the pejorative term "quackademia". Robert Todd Carroll described integrative medicine as "a synonym for 'alternative' medicine that, at its worst, integrates sense with nonsense. At its best, integrative medicine supports both consensus treatments of science-based medicine and treatments that the science, while promising perhaps, does not justify." Rose Shapiro has criticized the field of alternative medicine for rebranding the same practices as integrative medicine.

CAM is an acronym for complementary and alternative medicine. The 2019 World Health Organization (WHO) Global Report on Traditional and Complementary Medicine states that the terms complementary and alternative medicine "refer to a broad set of health care practices that are not part of that country's own traditional or conventional medicine and are not fully integrated into the dominant health care system. They are used interchangeably with traditional medicine in some countries."

The Integrative Medicine Exam by the American Board of Physician Specialties includes the following subjects: manual therapies, biofield therapies, acupuncture, movement therapies, expressive arts, traditional Chinese medicine, ayurveda, Indigenous medical systems, homeopathic medicine, naturopathic medicine, osteopathic medicine, chiropractic, and functional medicine.

=== Functional medicine ===
Functional medicine (FM) is a form of alternative medicine that encompasses many unproven and disproven methods and treatments. It is a rebranding of complementary and alternative medicine (CAM), and as such is pseudoscientific, and has been described as a form of quackery. In the US, FM practices have been ruled ineligible for course credits by the American Academy of Family Physicians because of concerns they may be harmful. Functional medicine was created by Jeffrey Bland, who founded The Institute for Functional Medicine (IFM), which is based in the US state of Washington, in the early 1990s as part of one of his companies, HealthComm. IFM, which promotes functional medicine, became a registered non-profit in 2001. Mark Hyman became an IFM board member and prominent promoter.

David Gorski, a surgical oncologist at Wayne State University, has written that FM is not well-defined and performs "expensive and generally unnecessary tests". Gorski says FM's vagueness is a deliberate tactic that makes functional medicine difficult to challenge. In an analysis for the Office for Science and Society at McGill University, Jonathan Jarry writes "Test enough people and you get a lot of false positives, which generate anxiety, more invasive tests, and sometimes unnecessary treatments." Proponents of functional medicine oppose established medical knowledge and reject its models, instead adopting a model of disease based on the notion of "antecedents", "triggers", and "mediators". These are meant to correspond to the underlying causes of health issues, the immediate causes, and the particular characteristics of a person's illness. A functional medicine practitioner devises a "matrix" from these factors to serve as the basis for treatment. Treatments, practices, and concepts are generally not supported by medical evidence. Patients of functional medicine practitioners may also be told to undertake unnecessary diets that can limit food choices. Jonathan Stea writes that functional medicine, integrative medicine, and CAM "are marketing terms designed to confuse patients, promote pseudoscience, and sow distrust in mainstream medicine."

In the 1990s, integrative medicine started to be marketed by a new term, "functional medicine". FM practitioners claim to diagnose and treat conditions that have been found by research studies not to exist, such as adrenal fatigue and numerous imbalances in body chemistry. For instance, contrary to scientific evidence, Joe Pizzorno, a major figure in FM, claimed that 25% of people in the United States have heavy metal poisoning and need to undergo detoxification. Many scientists state that such detox supplements are a waste of time and money. Detox has been also called "mass delusion". In 2014, the American Academy of Family Physicians withdrew course credits for functional medicine courses, having identified some of its treatments as "harmful and dangerous". In 2018, it partly lifted the ban, but only to allow overview classes, not to teach its practice. The opening of centers for functional medicine at the Cleveland Clinic and George Washington University was described by David Gorski as an "unfortunate" example of "quackademia" — that is, a quackery infiltrating academic medical centers.

=== Other terms ===
Traditional medicine (TM) refers to certain practices within a culture which have existed since before the advent of medical science, Many TM practices are based on "holistic" approaches to disease and health, versus the scientific evidence-based methods in conventional medicine. The 2019 WHO report defines traditional medicine as "the sum total of the knowledge, skill and practices based on the theories, beliefs and experiences indigenous to different cultures, whether explicable or not, used in the maintenance of health as well as in the prevention, diagnosis, improvement or treatment of physical and mental illness." When used outside the original setting and in the absence of scientific evidence, TM practices are typically referred to as "alternative medicine".

Holistic medicine is another rebranding of alternative medicine. In this case, the words balance and holism are often used alongside complementary or integrative, claiming to take into fuller account the "whole" person, in contrast to the supposed reductionism of medicine.

=== Challenges in defining alternative medicine ===
Prominent members of the science and biomedical science community say that it is not meaningful to define an alternative medicine that is separate from a conventional medicine because the expressions "conventional medicine", "alternative medicine", "complementary medicine", "integrative medicine", and "holistic medicine" do not refer to any medicine at all. Others say that alternative medicine cannot be precisely defined because of the diversity of theories and practices it includes, and because the boundaries between alternative and conventional medicine overlap, are porous, and change. Healthcare practices categorized as alternative may differ in their historical origin, theoretical basis, diagnostic technique, therapeutic practice and in their relationship to the medical mainstream. Under a definition of alternative medicine as "non-mainstream", treatments considered alternative in one location may be considered conventional in another.

Critics say the expression is deceptive because it implies there is an effective alternative to science-based medicine, and that complementary is deceptive because it implies that the treatment increases the effectiveness of (complements) science-based medicine, while alternative medicines that have been tested nearly always have no measurable positive effect compared to a placebo. Journalist John Diamond wrote that "there is really no such thing as alternative medicine, just medicine that works and medicine that doesn't", a notion later echoed by Paul Offit: "The truth is there's no such thing as conventional or alternative or complementary or integrative or holistic medicine. There's only medicine that works and medicine that doesn't. And the best way to sort it out is by carefully evaluating scientific studies—not by visiting Internet chat rooms, reading magazine articles, or talking to friends."

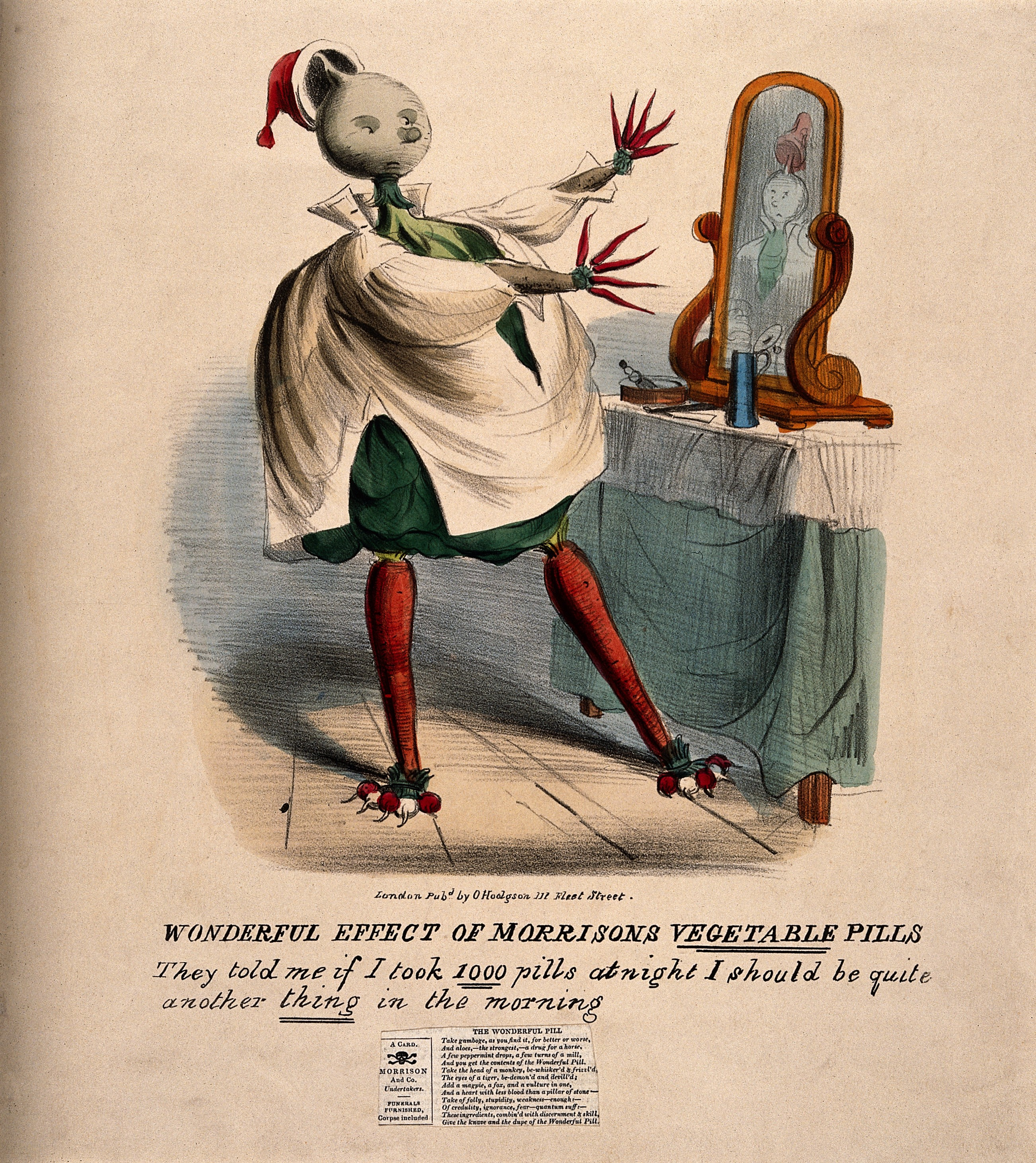
"They told me if I took 1000 pills at night I should be quite another thing in the morning", an early 19th-century satire on Morison's Vegetable Pills, an alternative medicine supplement

== Types ==
Alternative medicine consists of a wide range of health care practices, products, and therapies. The shared feature is a claim to heal that is not based on the scientific method. Alternative medicine practices are diverse in their foundations and methodologies. Alternative medicine practices may be classified by their cultural origins or by the types of beliefs upon which they are based. Methods may incorporate or be based on traditional medicinal practices of a particular culture, folk knowledge, superstition, spiritual beliefs, belief in supernatural energies (antiscience), pseudoscience, errors in reasoning, propaganda, fraud, new or different concepts of health and disease, and any bases other than being proven by scientific methods. Different cultures may have their own unique traditional or belief based practices developed recently or over thousands of years, and specific practices or entire systems of practices.

=== Unscientific belief systems ===
Alternative medicine, such as using naturopathy or homeopathy in place of conventional medicine, is based on belief systems not grounded in science.

	Proposed mechanism	Issues
Naturopathy	Naturopathic medicine is based on a belief that the body heals itself using a supernatural vital energy that guides bodily processes.	In conflict with the paradigm of evidence-based medicine. Many naturopaths have opposed vaccination, and "scientific evidence does not support claims that naturopathic medicine can cure cancer or any other disease".
Homeopathy	A belief that a substance that causes the symptoms of a disease in healthy people cures similar symptoms in sick people. (Note: In his book The Homœopathic Medical Doctrine Samuel Hahnemann the creator of homeopathy wrote: "Observation, reflection, and experience have unfolded to me that the best and true method of cure is founded on the principle, similia similibus curentur. To cure in a mild, prompt, safe, and durable manner, it is necessary to choose in each case a medicine that will excite an affection similar (ὅμοιος πάθος) to that against which it is employed.")	Developed before knowledge of atoms and molecules, or of basic chemistry, which shows that repeated dilution as practiced in homeopathy produces only water, and that homeopathy is not scientifically valid.

=== Traditional ethnic systems ===
Alternative medical systems may be based on traditional medicine practices, such as traditional Chinese medicine (TCM), Ayurveda in India, or practices of other cultures around the world. Some useful applications of traditional medicines have been researched and accepted within ordinary medicine, however the underlying belief systems are seldom scientific and are not accepted.

Traditional medicine is considered alternative when it is used outside its home region; or when it is used together with or instead of known functional treatment; or when it can be reasonably expected that the patient or practitioner knows or should know that it will not work – such as knowing that the practice is based on superstition.

	Claims	Issues
Traditional Chinese medicine	Traditional practices and beliefs from China, together with modifications made by the Communist party make up TCM. Common practices include herbal medicine, acupuncture (insertion of needles in the body at specified points), massage (Tui na), exercise (qigong), and dietary therapy.	The practices are based on belief in a supernatural energy called qi, considerations of Chinese astrology and Chinese numerology, traditional use of herbs and other substances found in China, a belief that the tongue contains a map of the body that reflects changes in the body, and an incorrect model of the anatomy and physiology of internal organs.
Ayurveda	Traditional medicine of India. Ayurveda believes in the existence of three elemental substances, the doshas (called Vata, Pitta and Kapha), and states that a balance of the doshas results in health, while imbalance results in disease. Such disease-inducing imbalances can be adjusted and balanced using traditional herbs, minerals and heavy metals. Ayurveda stresses the use of plant-based medicines and treatments, with some animal products, and added minerals, including sulfur, arsenic, lead and copper(II) sulfate.	Safety concerns have been raised about Ayurveda, with two U.S. studies finding about 20 percent of Ayurvedic Indian-manufactured patent medicines contained toxic levels of heavy metals such as lead, mercury and arsenic. A 2015 study of users in the United States also found elevated blood lead levels in 40 percent of those tested. Other concerns include the use of herbs containing toxic compounds and the lack of quality control in Ayurvedic facilities. Incidents of heavy metal poisoning have been attributed to the use of these compounds in the United States.

=== Supernatural energies ===
Bases of belief may include belief in existence of supernatural energies undetected by the science of physics, as in biofields, or in belief in properties of the energies of physics that are inconsistent with the laws of physics, as in energy medicine.

	Claims	Issues
Biofield therapy	Intended to influence energy fields that, it is purported, surround and penetrate the body.	Advocates of scientific skepticism such as Carl Sagan have criticized the lack of empirical evidence to support the existence of the putative energy fields on which these therapies are predicated.
Bioelectromagnetic therapy	Use verifiable electromagnetic fields, such as pulsed fields, alternating-current, or direct-current fields in an unconventional manner.	Asserts that magnets can be used to defy the laws of physics to influence health and disease.
Chiropractic	Spinal manipulation aims to treat "vertebral subluxations" which are claimed to put pressure on nerves.	Chiropractic was based on the belief that manipulating the spine unblocks the flow of a supernatural vital energy called Innate Intelligence, thereby affecting health and disease. Vertebral subluxation is a pseudoscientific entity not proven to exist.
Reiki	Practitioners place their palms on the patient near Chakras that they believe are centers of supernatural energies in the belief that these supernatural energies can transfer from the practitioner's palms to heal the patient.	Lacks credible scientific evidence.

=== Herbal remedies and other substances ===
Substance based practices use substances found in nature such as herbs, foods, non-vitamin supplements and megavitamins, animal and fungal products, and minerals, including use of these products in traditional medical practices that may also incorporate other methods. Examples include healing claims for non-vitamin supplements, fish oil, Omega-3 fatty acid, glucosamine, echinacea, flaxseed oil, and ginseng. Herbal medicine, or phytotherapy, includes not just the use of plant products, but may also include the use of animal and mineral products. It is among the most commercially successful branches of alternative medicine, and includes the tablets, powders and elixirs that are sold as "nutritional supplements". Only a very small percentage of these have been shown to have any efficacy, and there is little regulation as to standards and safety of their contents.

=== Religion, faith healing, and prayer ===
	Claims	Issues
Faith healing	There is a divine or spiritual intervention in healing.	Lack of evidence for effectiveness. Unwanted outcomes, such as death and disability, "have occurred when faith healing was elected instead of medical care for serious injuries or illnesses". A 2001 double-blind study of 799 discharged coronary surgery patients found that "intercessory prayer had no significant effect on medical outcomes after hospitalization in a coronary care unit."

=== NCCIH classification ===
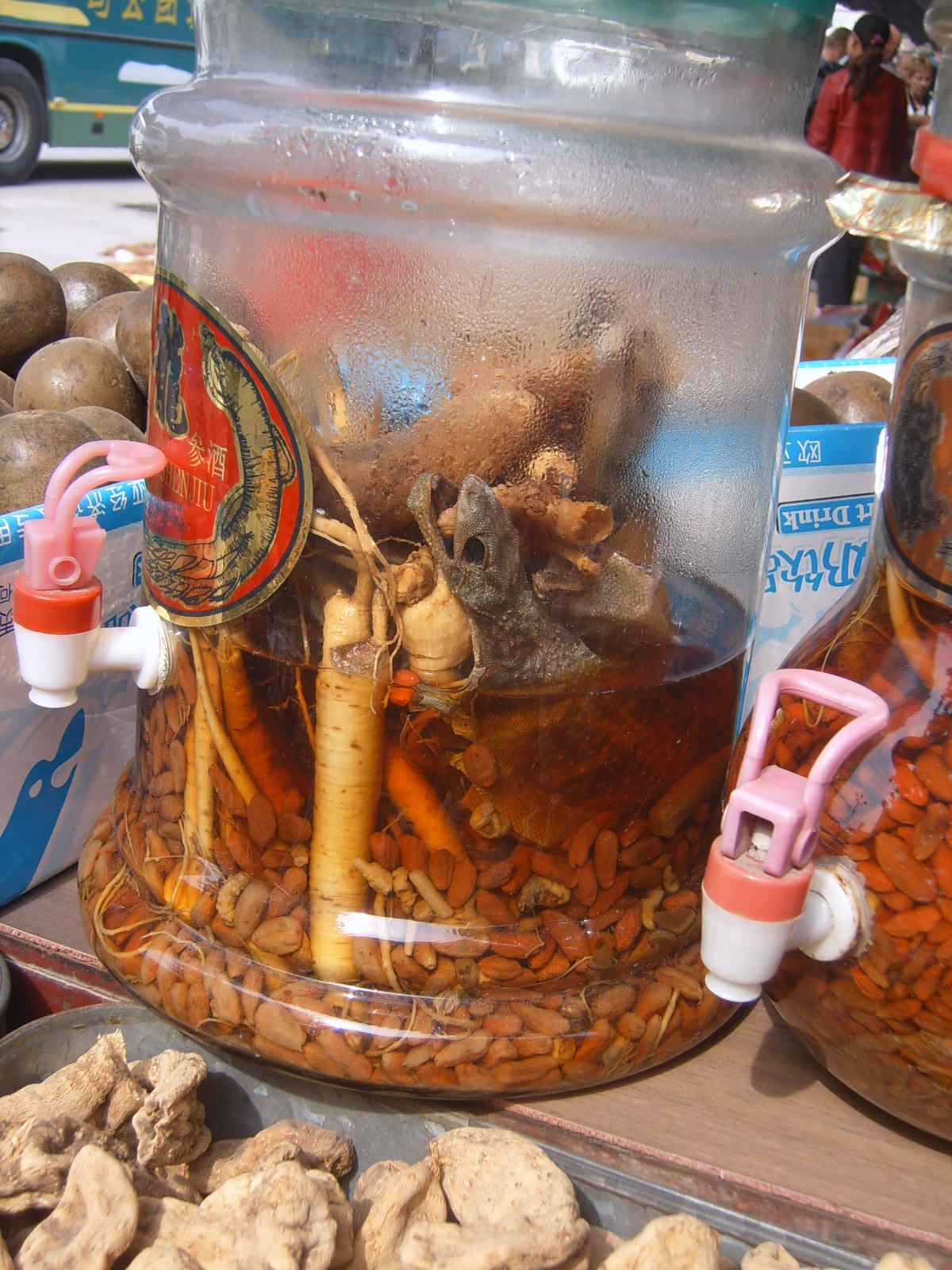
Ready-to-drink traditional Chinese medicine mixture

The United States agency National Center for Complementary and Integrative Health (NCCIH) has created a classification system for branches of complementary and alternative medicine that divides them into five major groups. These groups have some overlap, and distinguish two types of energy medicine: veritable which involves scientifically observable energy (including magnet therapy, colorpuncture and light therapy) and putative, which invokes physically undetectable or unverifiable energy. None of these energies have any evidence to support that they affect the body in any positive or health promoting way.

1. Whole medical systems: Cut across more than one of the other groups; examples include traditional Chinese medicine, naturopathy, homeopathy, and ayurveda.
2. Mind-body interventions: Explore the interconnection between the mind, body, and spirit, under the premise that they affect "bodily functions and symptoms". A connection between mind and body is conventional medical fact, and this classification does not include therapies with proven function such as cognitive behavioral therapy.
3. "Biology"-based practices: Use substances found in nature such as herbs, foods, vitamins, and other natural substances. (As used here, "biology" does not refer to the science of biology, but is a usage newly coined by NCCIH in the primary source used for this article. "Biology-based" as coined by NCCIH may refer to chemicals from a nonbiological source, such as use of the poison lead in traditional Chinese medicine, and to other nonbiological substances.)
4. Manipulative and body-based practices: feature manipulation or movement of body parts, such as is done in bodywork, chiropractic, and osteopathic manipulation.
5. Energy medicine: is a domain that deals with putative and verifiable energy fields:
  - Biofield therapies are intended to influence energy fields that are purported to surround and penetrate the body. The existence of such energy fields have been disproven.
  - Bioelectromagnetic-based therapies use verifiable electromagnetic fields, such as pulsed fields, alternating-current, or direct-current fields in a non-scientific manner.

== History ==
The history of alternative medicine may refer to the history of a group of diverse medical practices that were collectively promoted as "alternative medicine" beginning in the 1970s, to the collection of individual histories of members of that group, or to the history of western medical practices that were labeled "irregular practices" by the western medical establishment. It includes the histories of complementary medicine and of integrative medicine. Before the 1970s, western practitioners that were not part of the increasingly science-based medical establishment were referred to "irregular practitioners", and were dismissed by the medical establishment as unscientific and as practicing quackery. Until the 1970s, irregular practice became increasingly marginalized as quackery and fraud, as western medicine increasingly incorporated scientific methods and discoveries, and had a corresponding increase in success of its treatments. In the 1970s, irregular practices were grouped with traditional practices of nonwestern cultures and with other unproven or disproven practices that were not part of biomedicine, with the entire group collectively marketed and promoted under the single expression "alternative medicine".

Use of alternative medicine in the west began to rise following the counterculture movement of the 1960s, as part of the rising new age movement of the 1970s. This was due to misleading mass marketing of "alternative medicine" being an effective "alternative" to biomedicine, changing social attitudes about not using chemicals and challenging the establishment and authority of any kind, sensitivity to giving equal measure to beliefs and practices of other cultures (cultural relativism), and growing frustration and desperation by patients about limitations and side effects of science-based medicine. At the same time, in 1975, the American Medical Association, which played the central role in fighting quackery in the United States, abolished its quackery committee and closed down its Department of Investigation. By the early to mid 1970s the expression "alternative medicine" came into widespread use, and the expression became mass marketed as a collection of "natural" and effective treatment "alternatives" to science-based biomedicine. By 1983, mass marketing of "alternative medicine" was so pervasive that the British Medical Journal (BMJ) pointed to "an apparently endless stream of books, articles, and radio and television programmes urge on the public the virtues of (alternative medicine) treatments ranging from meditation to drilling a hole in the skull to let in more oxygen".

An analysis of trends in the criticism of complementary and alternative medicine (CAM) in five prestigious American medical journals during the period of reorganization within medicine (1965–1999) was reported as showing that the medical profession had responded to the growth of CAM in three phases, and that in each phase, changes in the medical marketplace had influenced the type of response in the journals. Changes included relaxed medical licensing, the development of managed care, rising consumerism, and the establishment of the USA Office of Alternative Medicine (later National Center for Complementary and Alternative Medicine, currently National Center for Complementary and Integrative Health). (Note: According to the medical historian James Harvey Young: In 1991 the Senate Appropriations Committee responsible for funding the National Institutes of Health (NIH) declared itself "not satisfied that the conventional medical community as symbolized at the NIH has fully explored the potential that exists in unconventional medical practices.")

=== Medical education ===
Mainly as a result of reforms following the Flexner Report of 1910 medical education in established medical schools in the US has generally not included alternative medicine as a teaching topic. (Note: As the medical professor Kenneth M. Ludmerer noted in 2010: "Flexner pointed out that the scientific method of thinking applied to medical practice. By scientific method, he meant testing ideas with well-planned experiments to establish accurate facts. The clinician's diagnosis was equivalent to the scientist's hypothesis: both medical diagnosis and hypothesis required the test of an experiment. Flexner argued that mastery of the scientific method of problem solving was the key for physicians to manage medical uncertainty and to practice in the most cost-effective way.") Typically, their teaching is based on current practice and scientific knowledge about: anatomy, physiology, histology, embryology, neuroanatomy, pathology, pharmacology, microbiology and immunology. Medical schools' teaching includes such topics as doctor-patient communication, ethics, the art of medicine, and engaging in complex clinical reasoning (medical decision-making). Writing in 2002, Snyderman and Weil remarked that by the early twentieth century the Flexner model had helped to create the 20th-century academic health center, in which education, research, and practice were inseparable. While this had much improved medical practice by defining with increasing certainty the pathophysiological basis of disease, a single-minded focus on the pathophysiological had diverted much of mainstream American medicine from clinical conditions that were not well understood in mechanistic terms, and were not effectively treated by conventional therapies.

By 2001 some form of CAM training was being offered by at least 75 out of 125 medical schools in the US. Exceptionally, the School of Medicine of the University of Maryland, Baltimore, includes a research institute for integrative medicine (a member entity of the Cochrane Collaboration). Medical schools are responsible for conferring medical degrees, but a physician typically may not legally practice medicine until licensed by the local government authority. Licensed physicians in the US who have attended one of the established medical schools there have usually graduated Doctor of Medicine (MD). All states require that applicants for MD licensure be graduates of an approved medical school and complete the United States Medical Licensing Examination (USMLE).

== Efficacy ==
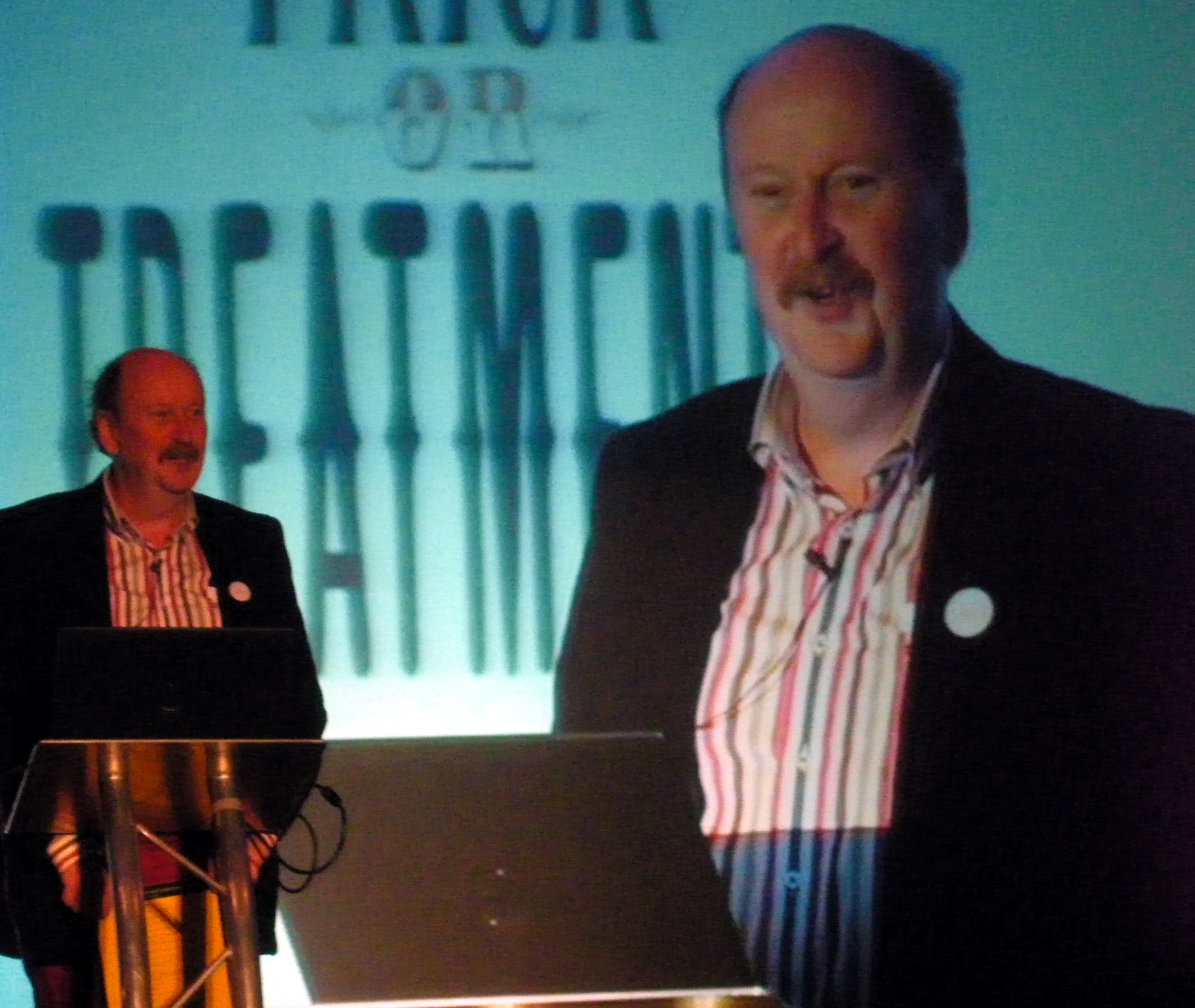
Edzard Ernst, an authority on scientific study of alternative therapies and diagnoses and the first university professor of CAM, in 2012

There is a general scientific consensus that alternative therapies lack the requisite scientific validation, and their effectiveness is either unproved or disproved. Many of the claims regarding the efficacy of alternative medicines are controversial, since research on them is frequently of low quality and methodologically flawed. Selective publication bias, marked differences in product quality and standardisation, and some companies making unsubstantiated claims call into question the claims of efficacy of isolated examples where there is evidence for alternative therapies.

The Scientific Review of Alternative Medicine points to confusions in the general population – a person may attribute symptomatic relief to an otherwise-ineffective therapy just because they are taking something (the placebo effect); the natural recovery from or the cyclical nature of an illness (the regression fallacy) gets misattributed to an alternative medicine being taken; a person not diagnosed with science-based medicine may never originally have had a true illness diagnosed as an alternative disease category.

Edzard Ernst, the first university professor of Complementary and Alternative Medicine, characterized the evidence for many alternative techniques as weak, nonexistent, or negative and in 2011 published his estimate that about 7.4% were based on "sound evidence", although he believes that may be an overestimate. Ernst has concluded that 95% of the alternative therapies he and his team studied, including acupuncture, herbal medicine, homeopathy, and reflexology, are "statistically indistinguishable from placebo treatments", but he also believes there is something that conventional doctors can usefully learn from the chiropractors and homeopath: this is the therapeutic value of the placebo effect, one of the strangest phenomena in medicine.

In 2003, a project funded by the CDC identified 208 condition-treatment pairs, of which 58% had been studied by at least one randomized controlled trial (RCT), and 23% had been assessed with a meta-analysis. According to a 2005 book by a US Institute of Medicine panel, the number of RCTs focused on CAM has risen dramatically.

As of 2005, the Cochrane Library had 145 CAM-related Cochrane systematic reviews and 340 non-Cochrane systematic reviews. An analysis of the conclusions of only the 145 Cochrane reviews was done by two readers. In 83% of the cases, the readers agreed. In the 17% in which they disagreed, a third reader agreed with one of the initial readers to set a rating. These studies found that, for CAM, 38.4% concluded positive effect or possibly positive (12.4%), 4.8% concluded no effect, 0.7% concluded harmful effect, and 56.6% concluded insufficient evidence. An assessment of conventional treatments found that 41.3% concluded positive or possibly positive effect, 20% concluded no effect, 8.1% concluded net harmful effects, and 21.3% concluded insufficient evidence. However, the CAM review used the more developed 2004 Cochrane database, while the conventional review used the initial 1998 Cochrane database.

Alternative therapies do not "complement" (improve the effect of, or mitigate the side effects of) functional medical treatment. Significant drug interactions caused by alternative therapies may instead negatively impact functional treatment by making prescription drugs less effective, such as interference by herbal preparations with warfarin.

In the same way as for conventional therapies, drugs, and interventions, it can be difficult to test the efficacy of alternative medicine in clinical trials. In instances where an established, effective, treatment for a condition is already available, the Helsinki Declaration states that withholding such treatment is unethical in most circumstances. Use of standard-of-care treatment in addition to an alternative technique being tested may produce confounded or difficult-to-interpret results.

Cancer researcher Andrew J. Vickers has stated:

Contrary to much popular and scientific writing, many alternative cancer treatments have been investigated in good-quality clinical trials, and they have been shown to be ineffective. The label "unproven" is inappropriate for such therapies; it is time to assert that many alternative cancer therapies have been "disproven".

== Perceived mechanism of effect ==
Anything classified as alternative medicine by definition does not have a proven healing or medical effect. However, there are different mechanisms through which it can be perceived to "work". The common denominator of these mechanisms is that effects are mis-attributed to the alternative treatment.

How alternative therapies "work": a) Misinterpreted natural course – the individual gets better without treatment. b) Placebo effect or false treatment effect – an individual receives "alternative therapy" and is convinced it will help. The conviction makes them more likely to get better. c) Nocebo effect – an individual is convinced that standard treatment will not work, and that alternative therapies will work. This decreases the likelihood standard treatment will work, while the placebo effect of the "alternative" remains. d) No adverse effects – Standard treatment is replaced with "alternative" treatment, getting rid of adverse effects, but also of improvement. e) Interference – Standard treatment is "complemented" with something that interferes with its effect. This can both cause worse effect, but also decreased (or even increased) side effects, which may be interpreted as "helping". Researchers, such as epidemiologists, clinical statisticians and pharmacologists, use clinical trials to reveal such effects, allowing physicians to offer a therapeutic solution best known to work. "Alternative treatments" often refuse to use trials or make it deliberately hard to do so.

=== Placebo effect ===
A placebo is a treatment with no intended therapeutic value. An example of a placebo is an inert pill, but it can include more dramatic interventions like sham surgery. The placebo effect is the concept that patients will perceive an improvement after being treated with an inert treatment. The opposite of the placebo effect is the nocebo effect, when patients who expect a treatment to be harmful will perceive harmful effects after taking it.

Placebos do not have a physical effect on diseases or improve overall outcomes, but patients may report improvements in subjective outcomes such as pain and nausea. A 1955 study suggested that a substantial part of a medicine's impact was due to the placebo effect. However, reassessments found the study to have flawed methodology. This and other modern reviews suggest that other factors like natural recovery and reporting bias should also be considered.

All of these are reasons why alternative therapies may be credited for improving a patient's condition even though the objective effect is non-existent, or even harmful. David Gorski argues that alternative treatments should be treated as a placebo, rather than as medicine. Almost none have performed significantly better than a placebo in clinical trials. Furthermore, distrust of conventional medicine may lead to patients experiencing the nocebo effect when taking effective medication.

=== Regression to the mean ===
A patient who receives an inert treatment may report improvements afterwards that it did not cause. Assuming it was the cause without evidence is an example of the regression fallacy. This may be due to a natural recovery from the illness, or a fluctuation in the symptoms of a long-term condition. The concept of regression toward the mean implies that an extreme result is more likely to be followed by a less extreme result.

=== Other factors ===
There are also reasons why a placebo treatment group may outperform a "no-treatment" group in a test which are not related to a patient's experience. These include patients reporting more favourable results than they really felt due to politeness or "experimental subordination", observer bias, and misleading wording of questions. In their 2010 systematic review of studies into placebos, Asbjørn Hróbjartsson and Peter C. Gøtzsche write that "even if there were no true effect of placebo, one would expect to record differences between placebo and no-treatment groups due to bias associated with lack of blinding." Alternative therapies may also be credited for perceived improvement through decreased use or effect of medical treatment, and therefore either decreased side effects or nocebo effects towards standard treatment.

== Use and regulation ==
=== Appeal ===
Practitioners of complementary medicine usually discuss and advise patients as to available alternative therapies. Patients often express interest in mind-body complementary therapies because they offer a non-drug approach to treating some health conditions.

In addition to the social-cultural underpinnings of the popularity of alternative medicine, there are several psychological issues that are critical to its growth, notably psychological effects, such as the will to believe, cognitive biases that help maintain self-esteem and promote harmonious social functioning, and the post hoc, ergo propter hoc fallacy.

In a 2018 interview with The BMJ, Edzard Ernst stated: "The present popularity of complementary and alternative medicine is also inviting criticism of what we are doing in mainstream medicine. It shows that we aren't fulfilling a certain need-we are not giving patients enough time, compassion, or empathy. These are things that complementary practitioners are very good at. Mainstream medicine could learn something from complementary medicine."

==== Marketing ====
Alternative medicine is a profitable industry with large media advertising expenditures. Accordingly, alternative practices are often portrayed positively and compared favorably to "big pharma".

The popularity of complementary & alternative medicine (CAM) may be related to other factors that Ernst mentioned in a 2008 interview in The Independent:

Why is it so popular, then? Ernst blames the providers, customers and the doctors whose neglect, he says, has created the opening into which alternative therapists have stepped. "People are told lies. There are 40 million websites and 39.9 million tell lies, sometimes outrageous lies. They mislead cancer patients, who are encouraged not only to pay their last penny but to be treated with something that shortens their lives." At the same time, people are gullible. It needs gullibility for the industry to succeed. It doesn't make me popular with the public, but it's the truth.

Paul Offit proposed that "alternative medicine becomes quackery" in four ways: by recommending against conventional therapies that are helpful, promoting potentially harmful therapies without adequate warning, draining patients' bank accounts, or by promoting "magical thinking". Promoting alternative medicine has been called dangerous and unethical. (Note: "Kessler refers to a lack of efficacy but never pushes back at Hatch by enumerating the dangers that unregulated products pose to the public, the dangers that fill the pages of Offit's book.")

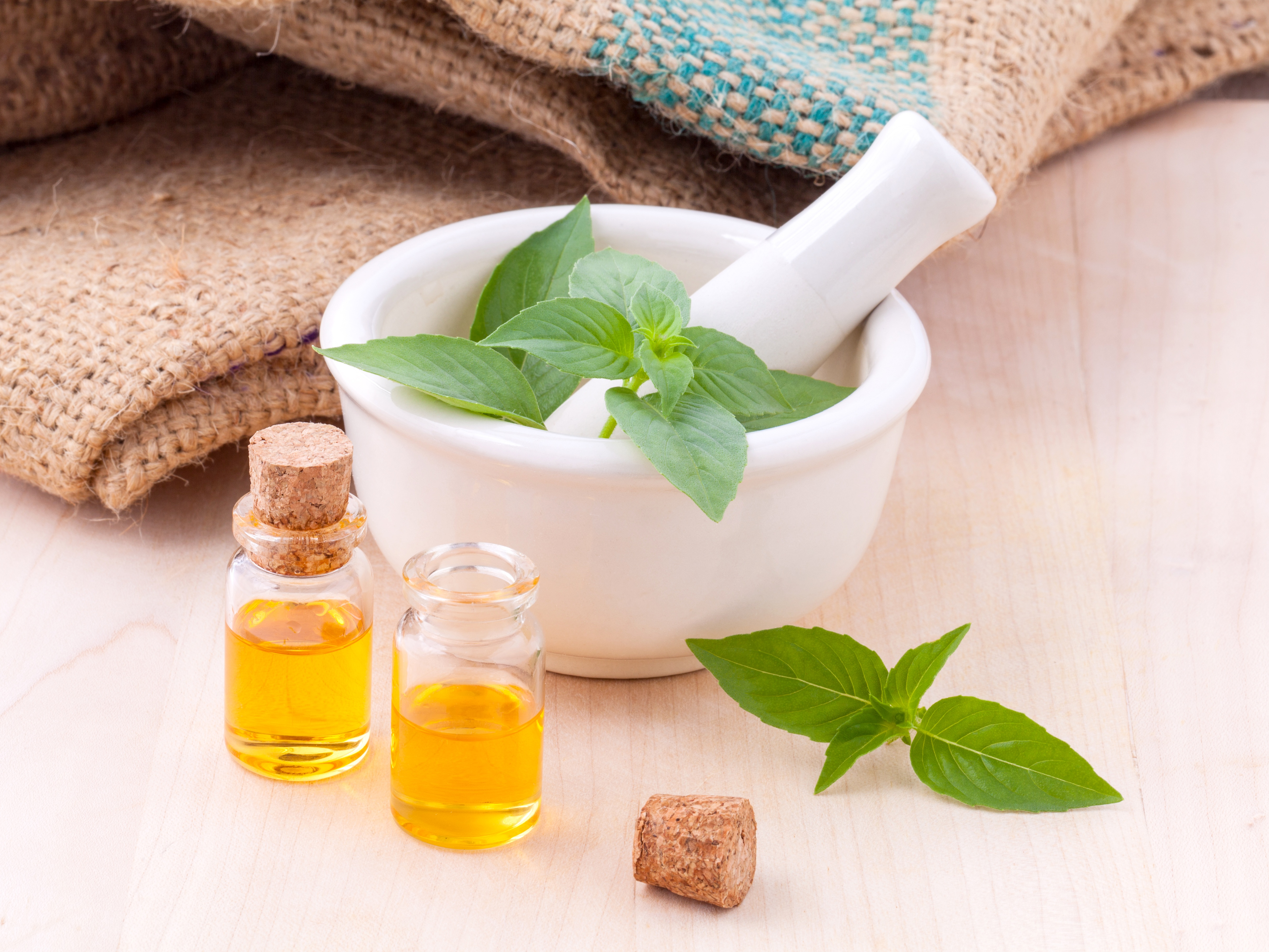
Friendly and colorful images of herbal treatments may look less threatening or dangerous when compared to conventional medicine. This is an intentional marketing strategy.

==== Social factors ====
Authors have speculated on the socio-cultural and psychological reasons for the appeal of alternative medicines among the minority using them in lieu of conventional medicine. There are several socio-cultural reasons for the interest in these treatments centered on the low level of scientific literacy among the public at large and a concomitant increase in antiscientific attitudes and new age mysticism. Related to this are vigorous marketing of extravagant claims by the alternative medical community combined with inadequate media scrutiny and attacks on critics. Alternative medicine is criticized for taking advantage of the least fortunate members of society.

There is also an increase in conspiracy theories toward conventional medicine and pharmaceutical companies, mistrust of traditional authority figures, such as the physician, and a dislike of the current delivery methods of scientific biomedicine, all of which have led patients to seek out alternative medicine to treat a variety of ailments. Many patients lack access to contemporary medicine, due to a lack of private or public health insurance, which leads them to seek out lower-cost alternative medicine. Medical doctors are also aggressively marketing alternative medicine to profit from this market.

Patients can be averse to the painful, unpleasant, and sometimes-dangerous side effects of biomedical treatments. Treatments for severe diseases such as cancer and HIV infection have well-known, significant side-effects. Even low-risk medications such as antibiotics can have potential to cause life-threatening anaphylactic reactions in a very few individuals. Many medications may cause minor but bothersome symptoms such as cough or upset stomach. In all of these cases, patients may be seeking out alternative therapies to avoid the adverse effects of conventional treatments.

=== Prevalence of use ===
According to research published in 2015, the increasing popularity of CAM needs to be explained by moral convictions or lifestyle choices rather than by economic reasoning.

In developing nations, access to essential medicines is severely restricted by lack of resources and poverty. Traditional remedies, often closely resembling or forming the basis for alternative remedies, may comprise primary healthcare or be integrated into the healthcare system. In Africa, traditional medicine is used for 80% of primary healthcare, and in developing nations as a whole over one-third of the population lack access to essential medicines.

In Latin America, inequities against BIPOC communities keep them tied to their traditional practices and therefore, it is often these communities that constitute the majority of users of alternative medicine. Racist attitudes towards certain communities disable them from accessing more urbanized modes of care. In a study that assessed access to care in rural communities of Latin America, it was found that discrimination is a huge barrier to the ability of citizens to access care; more specifically, women of Indigenous and African descent, and lower-income families were especially hurt. Such exclusion exacerbates the inequities that minorities in Latin America already face. Consistently excluded from many systems of westernized care for socioeconomic and other reasons, low-income communities of color often turn to traditional medicine for care as it has proved reliable to them across generations.

Commentators including David Horrobin have proposed adopting a prize system to reward medical research. This stands in opposition to the current mechanism for funding research proposals in most countries around the world. In the US, the NCCIH provides public research funding for alternative medicine. The NCCIH has spent more than US$2.5 billion on such research since 1992 and this research has not demonstrated the efficacy of alternative therapies. As of 2011, the NCCIH's sister organization in the NIH Office of Cancer Complementary and Alternative Medicine had given out grants of around $105 million each year for several years. Testing alternative medicine that has no scientific basis (as in the aforementioned grants) has been called a waste of scarce research resources.

That alternative medicine has been on the rise "in countries where Western science and scientific method generally are accepted as the major foundations for healthcare, and 'evidence-based' practice is the dominant paradigm" was described as an "enigma" in the Medical Journal of Australia. A 15-year systematic review published in 2022 on the global acceptance and use of CAM among medical specialists found the overall acceptance of CAM at 52% and the overall use at 45%.

==== In the United States ====
In the United States, the 1974 Child Abuse Prevention and Treatment Act (CAPTA) required that for states to receive federal money, they had to grant religious exemptions to child neglect and abuse laws regarding religion-based healing practices. Thirty-one states have child-abuse religious exemptions.

The use of alternative medicine in the US has increased, with a 50 percent increase in expenditures and a 25 percent increase in the use of alternative therapies between 1990 and 1997 in America. According to a national survey conducted in 2002, "36 percent of U.S. adults aged 18 years and over use some form of complementary and alternative medicine." Americans spend many billions on the therapies annually. Most Americans used CAM to treat and/or prevent musculoskeletal conditions or other conditions associated with chronic or recurring pain. In America, women were more likely than men to use CAM, with the biggest difference in use of mind-body therapies including prayer specifically for health reasons". In 2008, more than 37% of American hospitals offered alternative therapies, up from 27 percent in 2005, and 25% in 2004. More than 70% of the hospitals offering CAM were in urban areas.

A survey of Americans found that 88 percent thought that "there are some good ways of treating sickness that medical science does not recognize". Use of magnets was the most common tool in energy medicine in America, and among users of it, 58 percent described it as at least "sort of scientific", when it is not at all scientific. In 2002, at least 60 percent of US medical schools have at least some class time spent teaching alternative therapies. "Therapeutic touch" was taught at more than 100 colleges and universities in 75 countries before the practice was debunked by a nine-year-old child for a school science project.

==== Prevalence of use of specific therapies ====
Health campaign flyers, as in this example from the Food and Drug Administration, warn the public about unsafe products.

The most common CAM therapies used in the US in 2002 were prayer (45%), herbalism (19%), breathing meditation (12%), meditation (8%), chiropractic medicine (8%), yoga (5–6%), body work (5%), diet-based therapy (4%), progressive relaxation (3%), mega-vitamin therapy (3%) and visualization (2%).

In Britain, the most often used alternative therapies were Alexander technique, aromatherapy, Bach and other flower remedies, body work therapies including massage, Counseling stress therapies, hypnotherapy, meditation, reflexology, Shiatsu, Ayurvedic medicine, nutritional medicine, and yoga. Ayurvedic medicine remedies are mainly plant based with some use of animal materials. Safety concerns include the use of herbs containing toxic compounds and the lack of quality control in Ayurvedic facilities.

According to the National Health Service (England), the most commonly used complementary and alternative medicines (CAM) supported by the NHS in the UK are: acupuncture, aromatherapy, chiropractic, homeopathy, massage, osteopathy and clinical hypnotherapy.

==== In palliative care ====
Complementary therapies are often used in palliative care or by practitioners attempting to manage chronic pain in patients. Integrative medicine is considered more acceptable in the interdisciplinary approach used in palliative care than in other areas of medicine. "From its early experiences of care for the dying, palliative care took for granted the necessity of placing patient values and lifestyle habits at the core of any design and delivery of quality care at the end of life. If the patient desired complementary therapies, and as long as such treatments provided additional support and did not endanger the patient, they were considered acceptable." The non-pharmacologic interventions of complementary medicine can employ mind-body interventions designed to "reduce pain and concomitant mood disturbance and increase quality of life."

=== Regulation ===
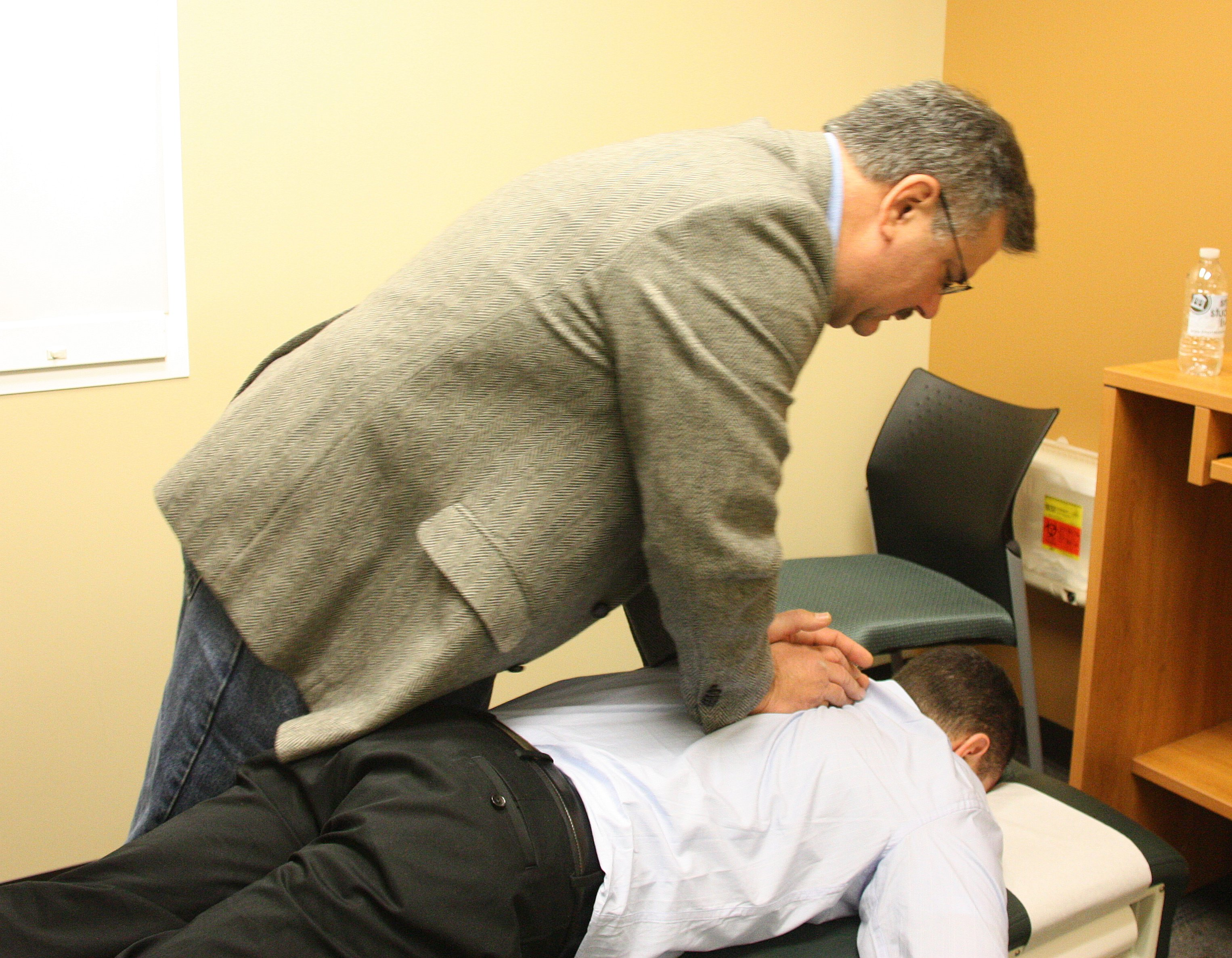
A chiropractor "adjusting" the spine

The alternative medicine lobby has successfully pushed for alternative therapies to be subject to far less regulation than conventional medicine. Some professions of complementary/traditional/alternative medicine, such as chiropractic, have achieved full regulation in North America and other parts of the world and are regulated in a manner similar to that governing science-based medicine. In contrast, other approaches may be partially recognized and others have no regulation at all. In some cases, promotion of alternative therapies is allowed when there is demonstrably no effect, only a tradition of use. Despite laws making it illegal to market or promote alternative therapies for use in cancer treatment, many practitioners promote them.

Regulation and licensing of alternative medicine ranges widely from country to country, and state to state. In Austria and Germany complementary and alternative medicine is mainly in the hands of doctors with MDs, and half or more of the American alternative practitioners are licensed MDs. In Germany herbs are tightly regulated: half are prescribed by doctors and covered by health insurance.

Government bodies in the US and elsewhere have published information or guidance about alternative medicine. The U.S. Food and Drug Administration (FDA), has issued online warnings for consumers about medication health fraud. This includes a section on Alternative Medicine Fraud, such as a warning that Ayurvedic products generally have not been approved by the FDA before marketing.

== Risks and problems ==
The National Science Foundation has studied the problematic side of the public's attitudes and understandings of science fiction, pseudoscience, and belief in alternative medicine. They use a quote from Robert L. Park to describe some issues with alternative medicine:

Alternative medicine is another concern. As used here, alternative medicine refers to all treatments that have not been proven effective using scientific methods. A scientist's view of the situation appeared in a recent book (Park 2000b)":

Between homeopathy and herbal therapy lies a bewildering array of untested and unregulated treatments, all labeled alternative by their proponents. Alternative seems to define a culture rather than a field of medicine—a culture that is not scientifically demanding. It is a culture in which ancient traditions are given more weight than biological science, and anecdotes are preferred over clinical trials. Alternative therapies steadfastly resist change, often for centuries or even millennia, unaffected by scientific advances in the understanding of physiology or disease. Incredible explanations invoking modern physics are sometimes offered for how alternative therapies might work, but there seems to be little interest in testing these speculations scientifically.

=== Negative outcomes ===
According to the Institute of Medicine, use of alternative medical techniques may result in several types of harm:

- "Direct harm, which results in adverse patient outcome."
- "Economic harm, which results in monetary loss but presents no health hazard;"
- "Indirect harm, which results in a delay of appropriate treatment, or in unreasonable expectations that discourage patients and their families from accepting and dealing effectively with their medical conditions;"

==== Interactions with conventional pharmaceuticals ====
Forms of alternative medicine that are biologically active can be dangerous even when used in conjunction with conventional medicine. Examples include immuno-augmentation therapy, shark cartilage, bioresonance therapy, oxygen and ozone therapies, and insulin potentiation therapy. Some herbal remedies can cause dangerous interactions with chemotherapy drugs, radiation therapy, or anesthetics during surgery, among other problems. An example of these dangers was reported by Associate Professor Alastair MacLennan of Adelaide University, Australia regarding a patient who almost bled to death on the operating table after neglecting to mention that she had been taking "natural" potions to "build up her strength" before the operation, including a powerful anticoagulant that nearly caused her death.

To ABC Online, MacLennan also gives another possible mechanism:

And lastly there's the cynicism and disappointment and depression that some patients get from going on from one alternative medicine to the next, and they find after three months the placebo effect wears off, and they're disappointed and they move on to the next one, and they're disappointed and disillusioned, and that can create depression and make the eventual treatment of the patient with anything effective difficult, because you may not get compliance, because they've seen the failure so often in the past.

==== Side-effects ====
Conventional treatments are subjected to testing for undesired side-effects, whereas alternative therapies, in general, are not subjected to such testing at all. Any treatment – whether conventional or alternative – that has a biological or psychological effect on a patient may also have potential to possess dangerous biological or psychological side-effects. Attempts to refute this fact with regard to alternative therapies sometimes use the appeal to nature fallacy, i.e., "That which is natural cannot be harmful." Specific groups of patients such as patients with impaired hepatic or renal function are more susceptible to side effects of alternative remedies.

An exception to the normal thinking regarding side-effects is homeopathy. Since 1938, the FDA has regulated homeopathic products in "several significantly different ways from other drugs." Homeopathic preparations, termed "remedies", are extremely dilute, often far beyond the point where a single molecule of the original active (and possibly toxic) ingredient is likely to remain. They are, thus, considered safe on that count, but "their products are exempt from good manufacturing practice requirements related to expiration dating and from finished product testing for identity and strength", and their alcohol concentration may be much higher than allowed in conventional drugs.

==== Treatment delay ====
Alternative medicine may discourage people from getting the best possible treatment. Those having experienced or perceived success with one alternative therapy for a minor ailment may be convinced of its efficacy and persuaded to extrapolate that success to some other alternative therapy for a more serious, possibly life-threatening illness. For this reason, critics argue that therapies that rely on the placebo effect to define success are very dangerous. According to mental health journalist Scott Lilienfeld in 2002, "unvalidated or scientifically unsupported mental health practices can lead individuals to forgo effective treatments" and refers to this as opportunity cost. Individuals who spend large amounts of time and money on ineffective treatments may be left with precious little of either, and may forfeit the opportunity to obtain treatments that could be more helpful. In short, even innocuous treatments can indirectly produce negative outcomes. Between 2001 and 2003, four children died in Australia because their parents chose ineffective naturopathic, homeopathic, or other alternative medicines and diets rather than conventional therapies.

==== Unconventional cancer "cures" ====
There have always been "many therapies offered outside of conventional cancer treatment centers and based on theories not found in biomedicine. These alternative cancer cures have often been described as 'unproven,' suggesting that appropriate clinical trials have not been conducted and that the therapeutic value of the treatment is unknown." However, "many alternative cancer treatments have been investigated in good-quality clinical trials, and they have been shown to be ineffective.... The label 'unproven' is inappropriate for such therapies; it is time to assert that many alternative cancer therapies have been 'disproven'."

Edzard Ernst has stated:

any alternative cancer cure is bogus by definition. There will never be an alternative cancer cure. Why? Because if something looked halfway promising, then mainstream oncology would scrutinize it, and if there is anything to it, it would become mainstream almost automatically and very quickly. All curative "alternative cancer cures" are based on false claims, are bogus, and, I would say, even criminal.

=== Rejection of science ===
There is no alternative medicine. There is only scientifically proven,
evidence-based medicine supported by solid data
or unproven medicine, for which scientific evidence is lacking.
— P.B. Fontanarosa, JAMA (1998)

Complementary and alternative medicine (CAM) is not as well researched as conventional medicine, which undergoes intense research before release to the public. Practitioners of science-based medicine also discard practices and treatments when they are shown ineffective, while alternative practitioners do not. Funding for research is also sparse making it difficult to do further research for effectiveness of CAM. Most funding for CAM is funded by government agencies. Proposed research for CAM are rejected by most private funding agencies because the results of research are not reliable. The research for CAM has to meet certain standards from research ethics committees, which most CAM researchers find almost impossible to meet. Even with the little research done on it, CAM has not been proven to be effective. Studies that have been done will be cited by CAM practitioners in an attempt to claim a basis in science. These studies tend to have a variety of problems, such as small samples, various biases, poor research design, lack of controls, negative results, etc. Even those with positive results can be better explained as resulting in false positives due to bias and noisy data.

Alternative medicine may lead to a false understanding of the body and of the process of science. Steven Novella, a neurologist at Yale School of Medicine, wrote that government-funded studies of integrating alternative medicine techniques into the mainstream are "used to lend an appearance of legitimacy to treatments that are not legitimate." Marcia Angell proposed that healthcare practices should be classified based solely on scientific evidence, and if a treatment had been rigorously tested and found safe and effective, science-based medicine will adopt it regardless of whether it was considered "alternative" to begin with. It is possible for a method to change categories (proven vs. unproven), based on increased knowledge of its effectiveness or lack thereof. Prominent supporters of this position are George D. Lundberg, former editor of the Journal of the American Medical Association (JAMA) and the journal's interim editor-in-chief Phil Fontanarosa.

Writing in 1999 in CA: A Cancer Journal for Clinicians Barrie R. Cassileth mentioned a 1997 letter to the United States Senate's Subcommittee on Public Health and Safety, which had deplored the lack of critical thinking and scientific rigor in OAM-supported research, had been signed by four Nobel Laureates and other prominent scientists. (This was supported by the National Institutes of Health (NIH).)

In March 2009, a staff writer for The Washington Post reported that the impending national discussion about broadening access to health care, improving medical practice and saving money was giving a group of scientists an opening to propose shutting down the National Center for Complementary and Alternative Medicine. They quoted one of these scientists, Steven Salzberg, a genome researcher and computational biologist at the University of Maryland, as saying "One of our concerns is that NIH is funding pseudoscience." They noted that the vast majority of studies were based on fundamental misunderstandings of physiology and disease, and had shown little or no effect.

Writers such as Carl Sagan, a noted astrophysicist, advocate of scientific skepticism and the author of The Demon-Haunted World: Science as a Candle in the Dark (1996), have lambasted the lack of empirical evidence to support the existence of the putative energy fields on which these therapies are predicated.

Sampson has also pointed out that CAM tolerated contradiction without thorough reason and experiment. Barrett has pointed out that there is a policy at the NIH of never saying something does not work, only that a different version or dose might give different results. Barrett also expressed concern that, just because some "alternatives" have merit, there is the impression that the rest deserve equal consideration and respect even though most are worthless, since they are all classified under the one heading of alternative medicine.

Some critics of alternative medicine are focused upon health fraud, misinformation, and quackery as public health problems, notably Wallace Sampson and Paul Kurtz founders of Scientific Review of Alternative Medicine and Stephen Barrett, co-founder of The National Council Against Health Fraud and webmaster of Quackwatch. Grounds for opposing alternative medicine include that:

- Alternative therapies typically lack any scientific validation, and their effectiveness either is unproven or has been disproved.
- It is usually based on religion, tradition, superstition, belief in supernatural energies, pseudoscience, errors in reasoning, propaganda, or fraud.
- Methods may incorporate or base themselves on traditional medicine, folk knowledge, spiritual beliefs, ignorance or misunderstanding of scientific principles, errors in reasoning, or newly conceived approaches claiming to heal.
- Research on alternative medicine is frequently of low quality and methodologically flawed.
- Treatments are not part of the conventional, science-based healthcare system.
- Where alternative therapies have replaced conventional science-based medicine, even with the safest alternative medicines, failure to use or delay in using conventional science-based medicine has caused deaths.

Many alternative medical treatments are not patentable, which may lead to less research funding from the private sector. In addition, in most countries, alternative therapies (in contrast to pharmaceuticals) can be marketed without any proof of efficacy – also a disincentive for manufacturers to fund scientific research.

English evolutionary biologist Richard Dawkins, in his 2003 book A Devil's Chaplain, defined alternative medicine as a "set of practices that cannot be tested, refuse to be tested, or consistently fail tests." Dawkins argued that if a technique is demonstrated effective in properly performed trials then it ceases to be alternative and simply becomes medicine.

CAM is also often less regulated than conventional medicine. There are ethical concerns about whether people who perform CAM have the proper knowledge to treat patients. CAM is often done by non-physicians who do not operate with the same medical licensing laws which govern conventional medicine, and it is often described as an issue of non-maleficence.

According to two writers, Wallace Sampson and K. Butler, marketing is part of the training required in alternative medicine, and propaganda methods in alternative medicine have been traced back to those used by Hitler and Goebbels in their promotion of pseudoscience in medicine.

In November 2011 Edzard Ernst stated that the "level of misinformation about alternative medicine has now reached the point where it has become dangerous and unethical. So far, alternative medicine has remained an ethics-free zone. It is time to change this."

Harriet Hall criticized the low standard of evidence accepted by the alternative medicine community:

Science-based medicine has one rigorous standard of evidence, the kind [used for pharmaceuticals] .... CAM has a double standard. They gladly accept a lower standard of evidence for treatments they believe in. However, I suspect they would reject a pharmaceutical if it were approved for marketing on the kind of evidence they accept for CAM.

=== Conflicts of interest ===
Some commentators have said that special consideration must be given to the issue of conflicts of interest in alternative medicine. Edzard Ernst has said that most researchers into alternative medicine are at risk of "unidirectional bias" because of a generally uncritical belief in their chosen subject. Ernst cites as evidence the phenomenon whereby 100% of a sample of acupuncture trials originating in China had positive conclusions. David Gorski contrasts evidence-based medicine, in which researchers try to disprove hyphotheses, with what he says is the frequent practice in pseudoscience-based research, of striving to confirm pre-existing notions. Harriet Hall writes that there is a contrast between the circumstances of alternative medicine practitioners and disinterested scientists: in the case of acupuncture, for example, an acupuncturist would have "a great deal to lose" if acupuncture were rejected by research; but the disinterested skeptic would not lose anything if its effects were confirmed; rather their change of mind would enhance their skeptical credentials.

=== Use of health and research resources ===
Research into alternative therapies has been criticized for "diverting research time, money, and other resources from more fruitful lines of investigation in order to pursue a theory that has no basis in biology." Research methods expert and author of Snake Oil Science, R. Barker Bausell, has stated that "it's become politically correct to investigate nonsense." A commonly cited statistic is that the US National Institute of Health had spent $2.5 billion on investigating alternative therapies prior to 2009, with none being found to be effective.

== See also ==
- Alternative therapies for developmental and learning disabilities
- Conservation medicine
- Ethnomedicine
- Psychic surgery
- Siddha medicine
- Thomsonianism, in United States early 19th century
- Chelation of heavy metals in autism
- Ancient Greek medicine

== Bibliography ==
- Bivins, R. (2007). Alternative Medicine? A History. Oxford University Press. ISBN 978-0-19-921887-5.
- Board of Science and Education, British Medical Association (1993). Complementary Medicine: New Approaches to Good Practice. Oxford University Press. ISBN 978-0-19-286166-5.
- Callahan, D., ed. (2004). The Role of Complementary and Alternative Medicine: Accommodating Pluralism. Washington, D.C.: Georgetown University Press. ISBN 978-1-58901-464-0.
- Cohen, Michael H. (1998). Complementary & Alternative Medicine: Legal Boundaries and Regulatory Perspectives. Baltimore: Johns Hopkins University Press. ISBN 978-0-8018-5689-1.
- Committee on the Use of Complementary and Alternative Medicine by the American Public for the Board on Health Promotion and Disease Prevention, Institute of Medicine (2005). Complementary and Alternative Medicine in the United States. Washington, D.C.: National Academy Press. ISBN 978-0-309-09270-8.
- Gevitz, N. (1997) [1993]. "Chapter 28: Unorthodox Medical Theories". In Bynum, W.F.; Porter, R.S. (eds.). Companion Encyclopedia of the History of Medicine. Vol. 1. New York & London: Routledge. ISBN 978-0-415-16419-1.
- Hahnemann, S. (1833). The Homœopathic Medical Doctrine, or "Organon of the Healing Art". Translated by Devrient, C.H. Annotated by Stratten, S. Dublin: W.F. Wakeman.
- Kasper, Dennis L; Fauci, Anthony S.; Hauser, Stephen L.; Longo, Dan L.; Jameson, J. Larry; Loscalzo, Joseph (2015). Harrison's Principles of Internal Medicine (19th ed.). New York: McGraw Hill Education. ISBN 978-0-07-180215-4.
- Kopelman, L. "The Role of Science in Assessing Conventional, Complementary, and Alternative Medicines". In Callahan (2004), pp. 36–53.
- Mishra, Lakshmi Chandra (2004). Scientific Basis for Ayurvedic Therapies. Boca Raton: CRC Press. ISBN 978-0-8493-1366-0.
- O'Connor, Bonnie Blair (1995). Healing Traditions: Alternative Medicine and the Health Professions. Philadelphia: University of Pennsylvania Press. ISBN 978-0-8122-1398-0.
- Ruggie, M. (2004). Marginal to Mainstream: Alternative Medicine in America. Cambridge University Press. ISBN 978-0-521-83429-2.
- Sagan, C. (1996). The Demon-Haunted World: Science As a Candle in the Dark. New York: Random House. ISBN 978-0-394-53512-8.
- Saks, M. (2003). Orthodox and Alternative Medicine: Politics, Professionalization and Health Care. Sage Publications. ISBN 978-1-4462-6536-9.
- Sointu, E. (2012). Theorizing Complementary and Alternative Medicines: Wellbeing, Self, Gender, Class. Basingstoke, England: Palgrave Macmillan. ISBN 978-0-230-30931-9.
- Taylor, Kim (2005). Chinese Medicine in Early Communist China, 1945–63: a Medicine of Revolution. Needham Research Institute Studies. London and New York: RoutledgeCurzon. ISBN 978-0-415-34512-5.
- Walton J. (2000) [Session 1999–2000, HL 123]. Sixth Report: Complementary and Alternative Medicine. London: The Stationery Office. ISBN 978-0-10-483100-7.
- Wieland, L.S.; et al. (2011). "Development and classification of an operational definition of complementary and alternative medicine for the Cochrane Collaboration". Alternative Therapies in Health and Medicine. 17 (2): 50–59. PMC 3196853. PMID 21717826.
- Wujastyk, D., ed. (2003). The Roots of Ayurveda: Selections from Sanskrit Medical Writings. Translated by D. Wujastyk. London and New York: Penguin Books. ISBN 978-0-14-044824-5.
- General Guidelines for Methodologies on Research and Evaluation of Traditional Medicine (PDF). Vol. WHO/EDM/TRM/2001.1. Geneva: World Health Organization (WHO). 2000. Archived (PDF) from the original on 2022-10-09. "This document is not a formal publication of the WHO. The views expressed in documents by named authors are solely the responsibility of those authors."
- WHO Guidelines on Basic Training and Safety in Chiropractic (PDF). Geneva: WHO. 2005. ISBN 978-92-4-159371-7. Archived (PDF) from the original on 2022-10-09.
