= Andrew Vickers =

Andrew Julian Vickers
- Born: 11 February 1967 (age 59)
- Education: University of Cambridge, University of Oxford
- Scientific career
- Fields: Oncology, alternative medicine, biostatistics
- Workplaces: Memorial Sloan Kettering Cancer Center
- Thesis: Homeopathy and clinical trials (1999)

Andrew Julian Vickers (born 11 February 1967) is a biostatistician and attending research methodologist at Memorial Sloan Kettering Cancer Center. Since 2013, he has also been the professor of public health at Weill Cornell Medical College. He is the statistical editor for the peer-reviewed journal European Urology.

== Education and career ==
Vickers received his B.A. from the University of Cambridge in 1989 and his D.Phil. from the University of Oxford in 1999. He joined Memorial Sloan Kettering in 1999 as an assistant attending research methodologist, before being appointed an associate attending research methodologist there in 2006 and an attending research methodologist in 2012.

== Research ==
Vickers is known for his research into prostate cancer screening. In 2011, he published a study which found that PSA velocity—the change in the blood level of prostate-specific antigen (PSA)--was not a more accurate predictor of prostate cancer than comparing PSA levels to a specific threshold. He was responsible for designing the algorithm that is used in the commercial "4Kscore" test for men with elevated PSA. With colleague Hans Lilja, Vickers published a series of studies demonstrating that a single PSA at age 45 - 60 is an extremely strong predictor of the long-term risk of prostate cancer mortality. Vickers is separately known for his methodological research on prediction modeling - he developed the statistical method known as "decision curve analysis" - and empirical research into several forms of alternative medicine, particularly acupuncture. Vickers was the lead author of a 2012 meta-analysis of 29 acupuncture trials published in the Archives of Internal Medicine. Vickers told Reuters that this meta-analysis "provides evidence that [patients with pain] would be justified in considering acupuncture." Vickers leads the "Amplio" surgical quality assurance initiative at Memorial Sloan Kettering and is Director of the "Web Survey" health informatics core facility.

== Personal life ==
Vickers is a competitive runner and plays ultimate frisbee. He has a daughter and two sons.
