= Mind the Science =

2024 book by Jonathan N. Stea

Mind the Science: Saving Your Mental Health from the Wellness Industry
- Cover of the first edition
- Author: Jonathan N. Stea PhD
- Language: English
- Subject: Pseudoscience, Wellness, Alternative medicine
- Publisher: Oxford University Press
- Publication date: September 3, 2024
- Media type: Print (hardcover, audiobook and Kindle)
- Pages: 264
- ISBN: 978-0197748817
- Preceded by: Investigating Clinical Psychology: Pseudoscience, Fringe Science, and Controversies (Investigating Psychology Pseudoscience)

Mind the Science: Saving Your Mental Health from the Wellness Industry is a 2024 book by psychologist and adjunct assistant professor at the University of Calgary, Jonathan N. Stea. This book examines the Wellness industry, the harm medical pseudoscience can have on individuals in the hope that people will be able to make more informed decisions about their health care. The book is written for the lay audience and also includes many appendices that define terms that act as a reference guide. This book was published by Oxford University Press.

== Synopsis ==
The journal Psychiatric Times notes that the book is divided into three main sections:

- how to see red flags in wellness information,
- identifying propaganda and misinformation, and
- solutions "grounded in mainstream science and medicine".

Stea uses many examples to explain to the layperson how seductive alternative medicine can be when science-based medicine does not offer immediate results. Using the personal story of his mother, Stea explains various pseudoscience practices such as acupuncture, reflexology, chiropractic, Reiki and more.

Multiple examples used show how difficult it is to navigate through mental illness, addiction and obsessive compulsive disorder often wasting time, money and causing "great harm". Stea gives an overview for readers on how to evaluate research while educating why not all studies are equal and explaining why.

== Reception ==
Psychologist Cassandra L. Boness writing for Skeptical Inquirer states that Mind the Science "is a critically important contribution to the literature on pseudoscience" and "artfully achieves the aim of his book: to 'educate and embolden' people to make informed decisions about their mental health by providing the tools needed to avoid harmful misinformation." Boness writes that Stea focuses on the harm created by the wellness industry and that she appeached that he used many examples, some personal experiences to educate readers. The Library Journal agreed, noting that the book was "rooted in science but written in accessible language, this highly informative book is an enlightening resource about mental-health misinformation and pseudoscience."

In a Book Club series on the Catalyst that profiles good reads that challenge stereotypes and stigmas, Fateema Sayani notes that "Stea demystifies the concept of science overall, noting that it’s something to regard as a tool or process and not something to believe in."

Clinical Assistant Professor of Psychiatry at Case Western Reserve University, Awais Aftab reviewing Mind the Science for Psychiatric Times writes that, "Stea's writing style is engaging, marked by empathy and humor, and he makes complex concepts digestible. The book provides practical, relatable scenarios that illustrate the dangers of pseudoscience."

The Science Writers and Communicators of Canada designated this work for their 2024 Book Award in the General category.
