= Kenneth Ludmerer =

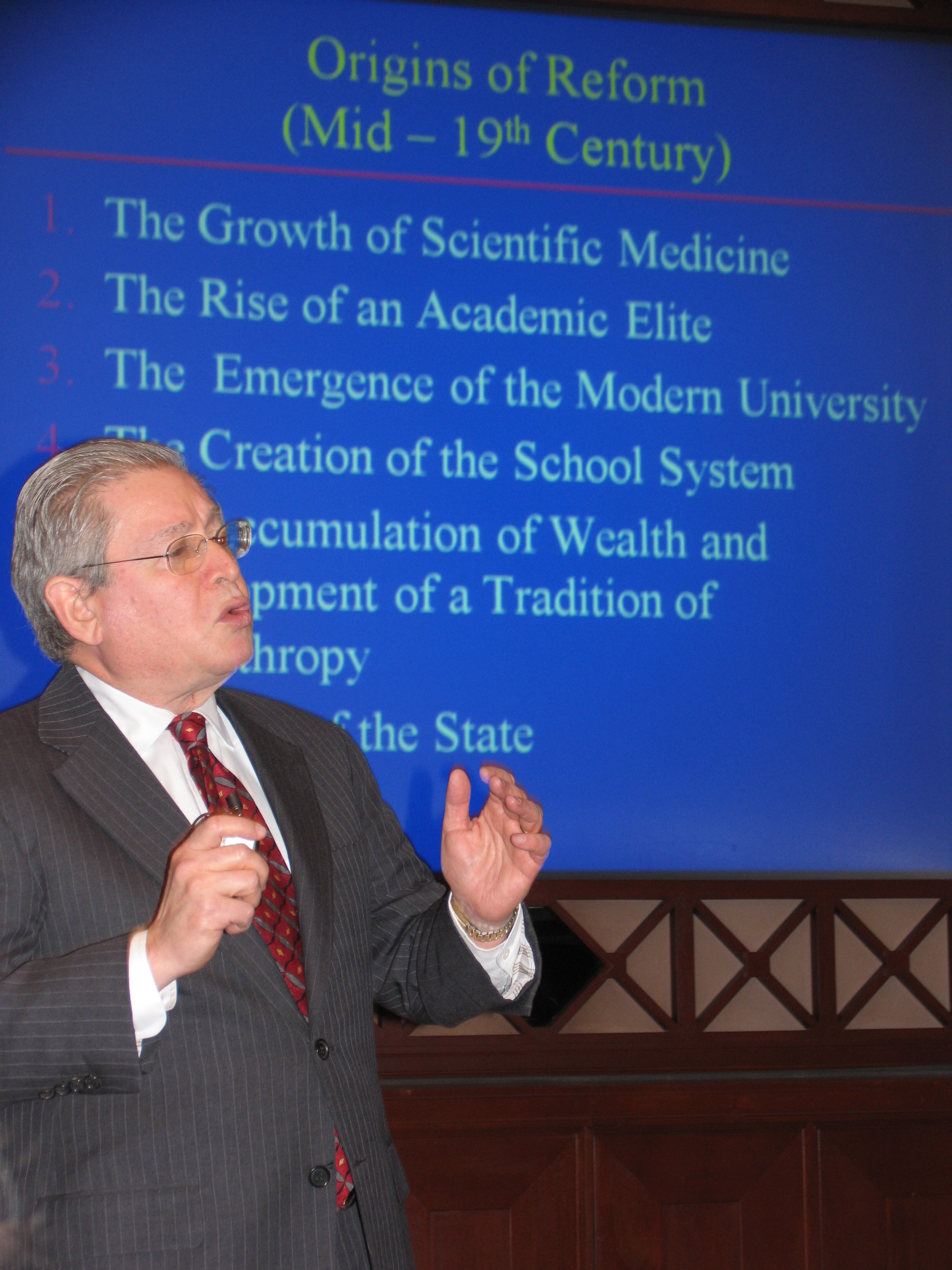
Kenneth M. Ludmerer in 2010

Kenneth M. Ludmerer (born in Long Beach, California, 1947) is a professor of history and of medicine at Washington University in St. Louis. Ludmerer began as an instructor of internal medicine to the chief resident at Barnes-Jewish Hospital and Washington University School of Medicine, from 1976-79. In 1979, he became both a professor of medicine in the medical school, and a professor of history in the Arts & Sciences. He is the author of three books in print, including two influential and award-winning books on the history of medical education in the United States.

== Early life and education ==
Kenneth Ludmerer grew up in Long Beach, California, where his father was an ophthalmologist. Interested in medicine from an early age, he received a bachelor's degree in history and science from Harvard College in 1968. He received a master's degree in history of medicine from Johns Hopkins University in 1971, followed by an M.D. in 1973. His first book was a study of eugenics, published while he completed his junior rotation in pediatrics at Johns Hopkins University. Upon his graduation, Ludmerer became an instructor at Washington University.

== Career ==
While he was initially concerned that his practice would preclude him from continuing research in history, he decided to continue working in that field, later explaining that "it occurred to me that if physicians can leave the bedside to study molecular genetics, why couldn't they leave the bedside to study the origins of the profession and the historical roots of problems facing medicine?"

=== Scholarship ===
Ludmerer has published four books and in excess of thirty peer reviewed scholarly articles on the history of medicine.

Ludmerer's first book, Genetics and American Society: A Historical Appraisal, was published by Johns Hopkins University Press in 1972. He observed in that work that "[p]erhaps no science in modern times has had so great a social impact and has been so enmeshed in diverse social issues as genetics", noting that "[a]s soon as the science of genetics began, many individuals started speaking of its social import and potential applicability to social problems". He criticized eugenics, characterizing it as a form of racism founded on a poor understanding of genetics. He faulted scientists for failing to correct public misperceptions even when these were acted on politically, as through immigration restrictions directed at ethnic groups characterized as being inferior.

His second book, Learning to Heal: The Development of American Medical Education, was also published by The Johns Hopkins University Press, in 1996. The work focuses primarily on the extensive changes which occurred in the period from the 1820s to the 1920s. However, it does go back to earliest instances of formal medical education in the pre-Revolutionary War American colonies of the 1760s, and it briefly addresses various trends in medical education up to and including the time in which Ludmerer was writing. He describes how this period saw the transition from unregulated institutions granting degrees to untested, sometimes illiterate students after less than a year of study, to the modern conception of medical schools, heavily regulated and having extensive entrance requirements, and organized curricula requiring four years of study.

Ludmerer particularly identifies the American Civil War as a transformative event, as the poor training of medical personnel in that era lead to many more deaths from disease than occurred in battle. Ludmerer criticizes the view that the Flexner Report spurred the advancement of medical education, crediting the report for spurring the closure of substandard medical schools, but noting that most of the innovations recommended by Abraham Flexner had already been initiated by the better schools by the time the report was written.

Ludmerer's third book, Time to Heal: American Medical Education from the Turn of the Century to the Era of Managed Care, was published by Oxford University Press in 1999. It is essentially a sequel to Learning to Heal, using the same narrative style to address in detail the developments in medical education over the twentieth century, and particularly from the 1920s through the 1990s.

Let Me Heal: The Opportunity to Preserve Excellence in American Medicine came out in 2014. It chronicles how changes in insurance payments and requirements drove changes in hospital-based medical practice, which in turn influenced residency training. Among other topics, Ludmerer addresses the controversial duty-hours regulations.

=== Recognition ===
Ludmerer has won a number of awards for his scholarly contributions. He received the Nicholas E. Davies Memorial Award from the American College of Physicians in 1997, the Distinguished Alumnus Award of Johns Hopkins University in 2000 and the Daniel Tosteson Award for Leadership and Medical Education from Harvard Medical School in 2001. He was elected to the American Academy of Arts and Sciences in the spring of 2002, and, although Ludmerer himself minimized the importance of the Flexner Report, he was selected by the Association of American Medical Colleges to receive the "Abraham Flexner Award" for distinguished service to medical education in 2003.

=== Tobacco company testimony ===
In 2000, Ludmerer came under some criticism when it was learned that he received over half a million dollars over a fifteen-year period to testify as an expert witness on medical history on behalf of tobacco companies. Ludmerer testified that, in his opinion, the companies could not have known of certain harmful effects of tobacco before the 1950s, although critics contend that earlier studies did suggest those effects.

== Books ==
- Genetics and the American Society: A Historical Appraisal (November 1, 1972) .
- Learning to Heal: The Development of American Medical Education (January 1, 1985).
- Time to Heal: American Medical Education from the Turn of the Century to the Era of Managed Care (January 27, 2005).
- Let Me Heal: The Opportunity to Preserve Excellence in American Medicine (October 27, 2014)
