= Asbjørn Hróbjartsson =

Danish medical researcher

Asbjørn Hróbjartsson is a Danish medical researcher. He is Professor of Evidence-Based Medicine and Clinical Research Methodology at the University of Southern Denmark, as well as head of research at Odense University Hospital's Center for Evidence-Based Medicine. He is the former editor-in-chief of the Danish journal Bibliotek for Læger. He is also affiliated with the Nordic Cochrane Centre in Copenhagen. He received his Ph.D. in June 2001 from the University of Copenhagen, with a thesis entitled Are placebo interventions associated with clinically important effects? He is best-known for a 2001 article he co-authored with Peter C. Gotzsche on the placebo effect. The article reviewed 114 studies comparing placebo treatment to no treatment, and concluded that placebos did not have clinically important effects for any condition, with the exception of self-reported pain and other continuous subjective outcomes. He has also co-authored a subsequent paper on placebo effect research with Ted Kaptchuk and Franklin G. Miller.
