= Michael H. Cohen =

American lawyer

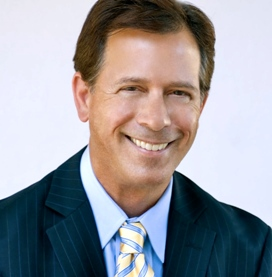
- Education: Columbia University (BA); University of California, Berkeley (JD, MBA); Iowa Writers Workshop (MFA)
- Occupations: Attorney, speaker, and author

Michael H. Cohen is an American attorney. He is the founder of the Cohen Healthcare Law Group, and a former professor at Harvard Medical School and the Harvard School of Public Health. Cohen has authored books on health-care law and policy.

== Legal career ==
After law school, Cohen served as a law clerk to Chief Judge Thomas P. Griesa in the Southern District of New York. Cohen began his legal career as at Davis Polk & Wardwell in New York City. At the same time, Cohen began training as a seminarian, yogi, Ericksonian hypnotherapist, and energy healer. He left the legal practice to become a professor of law and medicine, and returned later to found the Cohen Healthcare Law Group.

== Education and teaching ==
Cohen earned a Bachelor of Arts from Columbia University, a Juris Doctor from Boalt Hall School of Law, a Master of Business Administration from the Haas School of Business, both at the University of California, Berkeley, and a Master of Fine Arts from the Iowa Writers Workshop. While in law school, he was a member of the California Law Review, where he served as the Book Review Editor for volume 74. He also taught as a law professor following several years of law practice. Cohen served as an Assistant Professor of Health Law and Policy at the Harvard School of Public Health, and as an Assistant Professor of Medicine at Harvard Medical School starting in 2000. He was the first attorney in history to become a full-time faculty member at the Harvard Medical School. In 2002, 2003, and 2004 Cohen was the recipient of a National Institutes of Health award for Scholarly Works in Biomedicine and Health Publications.

Cohen served as Director of Legal Programs at Harvard Medical School Division for Research and Education in Complementary and Integrative Medical Therapies, and was awarded a Fortieth Anniversary Senior Fellowship at the Center for the Study of World Religions within Harvard Divinity School. Cohen has served as the committee Consultant for the National Academy of Sciences Committee on the Use of Complementary and Alternative Medicine by the American Public, and was the president of the Institute for Integrative and Energy Medicine in Newport Beach, California.

He is also a yoga practitioner and author of articles for yoga instructors, as well as medical and legal professionals.

== Publishing ==
Cohen's first book was Creative Writing for Lawyers, which was published in 1990. The book was intended to draw the natural fictional talents of lawyers, with the idea that legal and fictional writing are compatible genres. He next authored the book Complementary and Alternative Medicine: Legal Boundaries and Regulatory Perspectives in 1998.

Cohen then authored the book Beyond Complementary Medicine: Legal and Ethical Perspectives on Health Care and Human Evolution in 2000. Dr. Wayne Jonas reviewed the book in the Journal of the Association of American Medical Colleges stating that, "Cohen ... points out the consequences of applying legal and ethical principles to concepts and assumptions not usually discussed in conventional circles, yet used and believed daily by the public."

In 2002, Cohen authored the book Future Medicine: Ethical Dilemmas, Regulatory Challenges, and Therapeutic Pathways to Health Care and Healing in Human Transformation. Health Affairs reviewer Dr. Clyde B. Jensen stated that the book, "makes ... valuable contributions to the integration of conventional and complementary medicine". In 2006, Cohen authored the book Legal Issues in Integrative Medicine: A Guide for Clinicians, Hospitals, and Patients.

Cohen then authored the book Healing at the Borderland of Medicine and Religion in 2006. That year, Cohen also authored a chapter in the book Religion And Psychology: New Research entitled "Some Implications of Integrated Health Care for Religion, Psychology, and the Humanities". In addition, he co-authored the book The Practice of Integrative Medicine: A Legal and Operational Guide in 2006.

In addition to his books, chapters, and law review articles, he has also written articles in medical journals, including Archives of Internal Medicine, the Annals of Internal Medicine, and Pediatrics. He is also the author of the ABA Journal's Complementary & Alternative Medicine Law Blog.
