= John F. Dockweiler =

American politician (1895–1943)

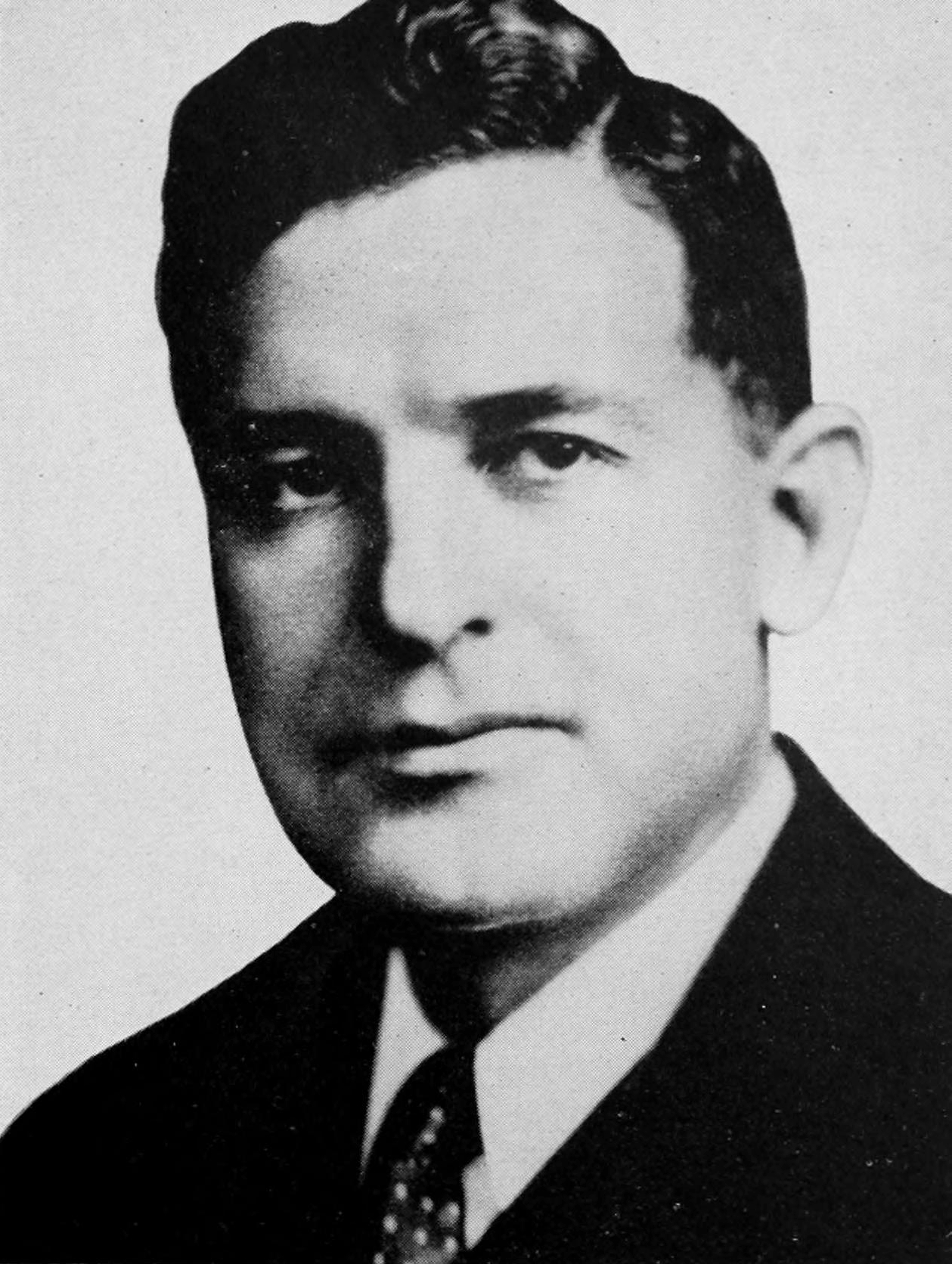
- Dockweiler c. 1938

30th District Attorney of Los Angeles County
- In office December 2, 1940 – January 31, 1943
- Preceded by: Buron Fitts
- Succeeded by: Frederick N. Howser

Member of the U.S. House of Representatives from California's 16th district
- In office March 4, 1933 – January 3, 1939
- Preceded by: District created
- Succeeded by: Leland M. Ford

Personal details
- Born: John Francis Dockweiler; September 19, 1895 Los Angeles, California, U.S.
- Died: January 31, 1943 (aged 47) Los Angeles, California, U.S.
- Resting place: Calvary Cemetery, Los Angeles
- Party: Democratic
- Spouse: Angelia Irene McManus (m. 1935)
- Parents: Isidore B. Dockweiler (father); Gertrude Reeve (mother)
- Education: Loyola College of Los Angeles (A.B.); University of Southern California (J.D.); Harvard Law School

John Francis Dockweiler (September 19, 1895 – January 31, 1943) was an American lawyer and politician who served three terms as a U.S. representative from California from 1933 to 1939, and as the 30th district attorney of Los Angeles County from 1940 until his death in 1943.

== Biography ==
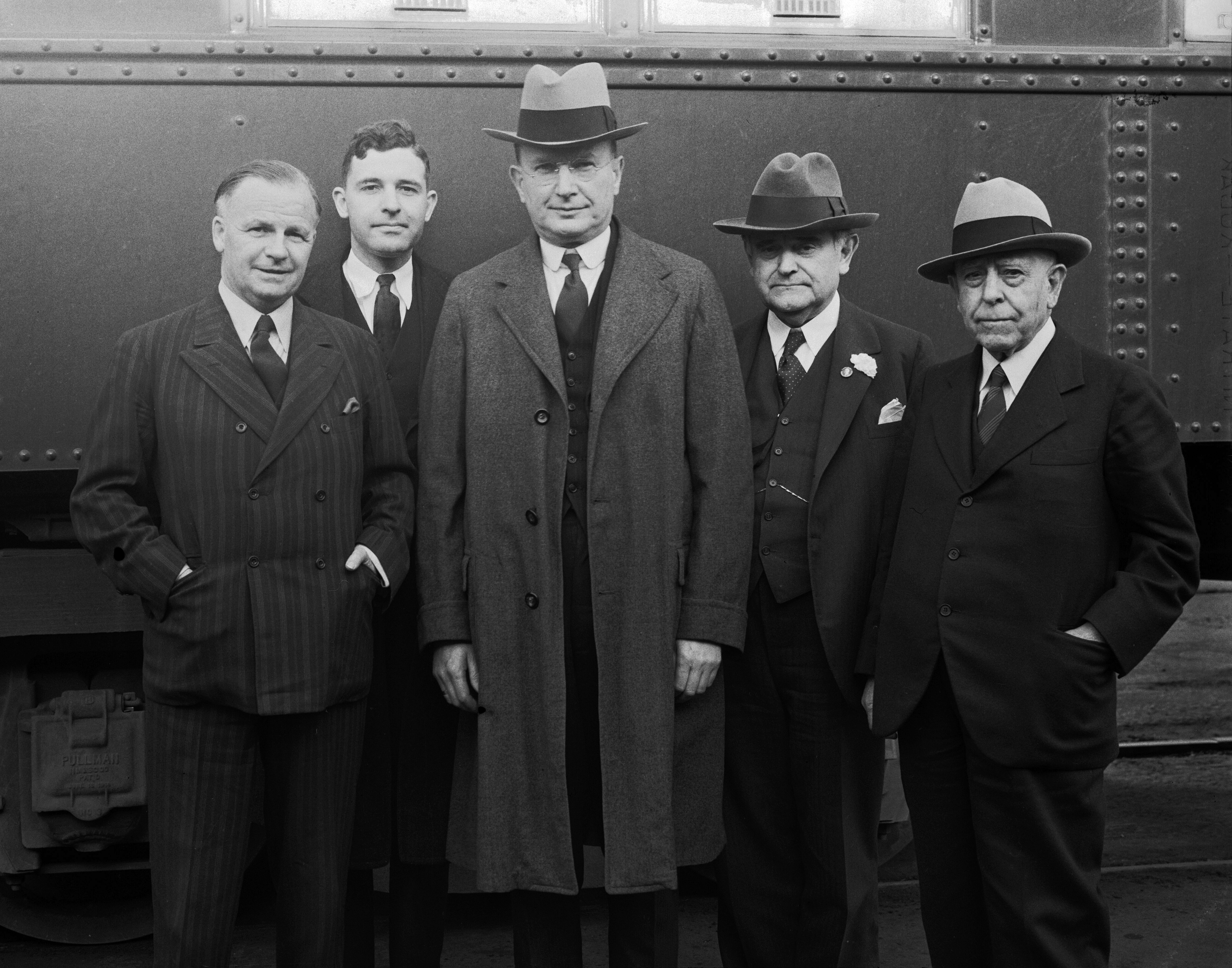
Senator Burton K. Wheeler met by members of the Roosevelt campaign in California, 1932 (L-R): J. F. T. O'Connor, John F. Dockweiler, Burton K. Wheeler, Isidore B. Dockweiler, and Reginaldo del Valle.

John Francis Dockweiler was born in Los Angeles to Isidore Bernard Dockweiler and Gertrude Reeve. As a youth, he tried his hand at acting and theatrical pursuits, but his career never gained momentum. Dockweiler attended parochial schools. He graduated from the Loyola College of Los Angeles in 1918 and from the University of Southern California in 1921. He attended the law department of Harvard University. He was admitted to the bar in 1921, and commenced law practice in Los Angeles in 1922.

=== Congress ===
Dockweiler was elected as a Democrat to the Seventy-third, Seventy-fourth, and Seventy-fifth Congresses (March 4, 1933 – January 3, 1939). He was not a candidate for renomination in the primaries in 1938, but was instead an unsuccessful primary candidate for governor of California, losing to state senator Culbert Olson. In the general election, he was an unsuccessful independent candidate for reelection to the Seventy-sixth Congress.

=== Later career and death ===
Dockweiler resumed the practice of law and ran for Los Angeles County District Attorney in 1940, defeating three-term incumbent Buron Fitts by a margin of over 260,000 votes. Dockweiler served in that office from December 2, 1940, until his death from pneumonia on January 31, 1943. He was interred in Calvary Cemetery (New Calvary Catholic Cemetery) in East Los Angeles.

== Electoral history ==
1932 United States House of Representatives elections in California
Party	Candidate	Votes	%
Democratic	John F. Dockweiler	70,333	54.9
Republican	Clyde Woodworth	57,718	45.1
Total votes		128,051	100.0
Turnout			
Democratic win (new seat)			

1934 United States House of Representatives elections in California
Party	Candidate	Votes	%
Democratic	John F. Dockweiler (inc.)	119,332	100.0
Turnout			
Democratic hold			

1936 United States House of Representatives elections in California
Party	Candidate	Votes	%
Democratic	John F. Dockweiler (inc.)	90,986	57.7
Republican	Raymond V. Darby	66,583	42.3
Total votes		157,569	100.0
Turnout			
Democratic hold			

1938 Democratic primary results, California governor
Party	Candidate	Votes	%
Democratic	Culbert L. Olson	483,483	41.97%
Democratic	John F. Dockweiler	218,342	18.96%
Democratic	Daniel C. Murphy	137,740	11.96%
Democratic	Raymond L. Haight	125,012	10.85%
Democratic	Herbert C. Legg	80,586	7.00%
Democratic	J. F. T. O'Connor	71,999	6.25%
Democratic	William H. Neblett	21,219	1.84%
Democratic	Teodoro Antonio Tomasini	10,142	0.88%
Democratic	Frank F. Merriam (write-in)	3,340	0.29%
Total votes		1,151,863	100.00%

1938 United States House of Representatives elections in California
Party	Candidate	Votes	%
Republican	Leland M. Ford	97,407	62.8
Democratic	John F. Dockweiler (write-in)	32,863	21.2
Townsend	Ted E. Felt	16,045	10.3
Progressive Party (United States, 1924)	J. Barton Huthins	6,643	4.3
Communist	La Rue McCormick	2,070	1.3
Total votes		155,028	100.0
Turnout			
Republican gain from Democratic			

== External resources ==
- United States Congress. "John F. Dockweiler (id: D000387)". Biographical Directory of the United States Congress.

U.S. House of Representatives
Preceded by None	Member of the U.S. House of Representatives from California's 16th congressional district 1933–1939	Succeeded by Leland M. Ford
