= 1938 California gubernatorial election =

- November 8, 1938
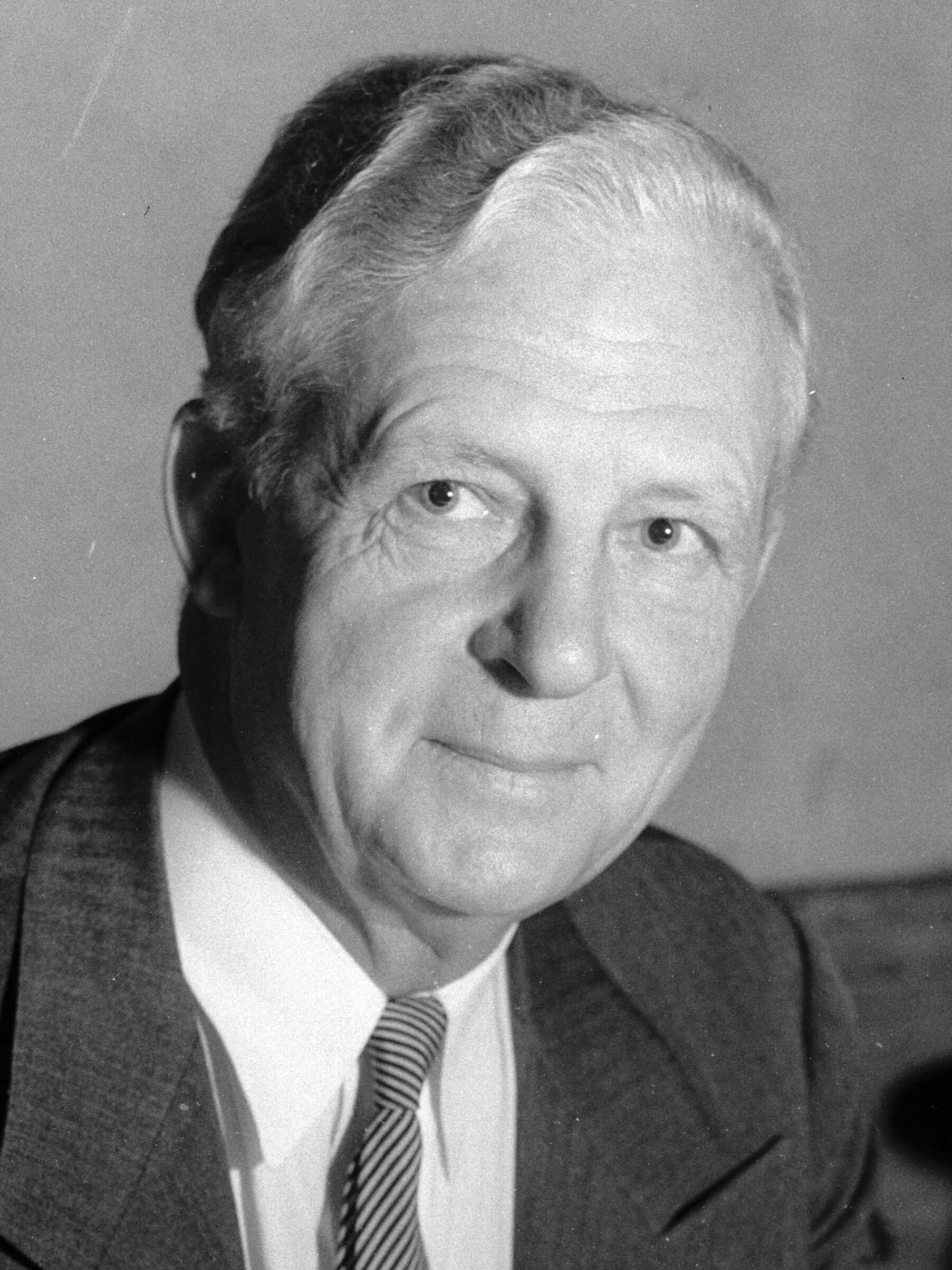

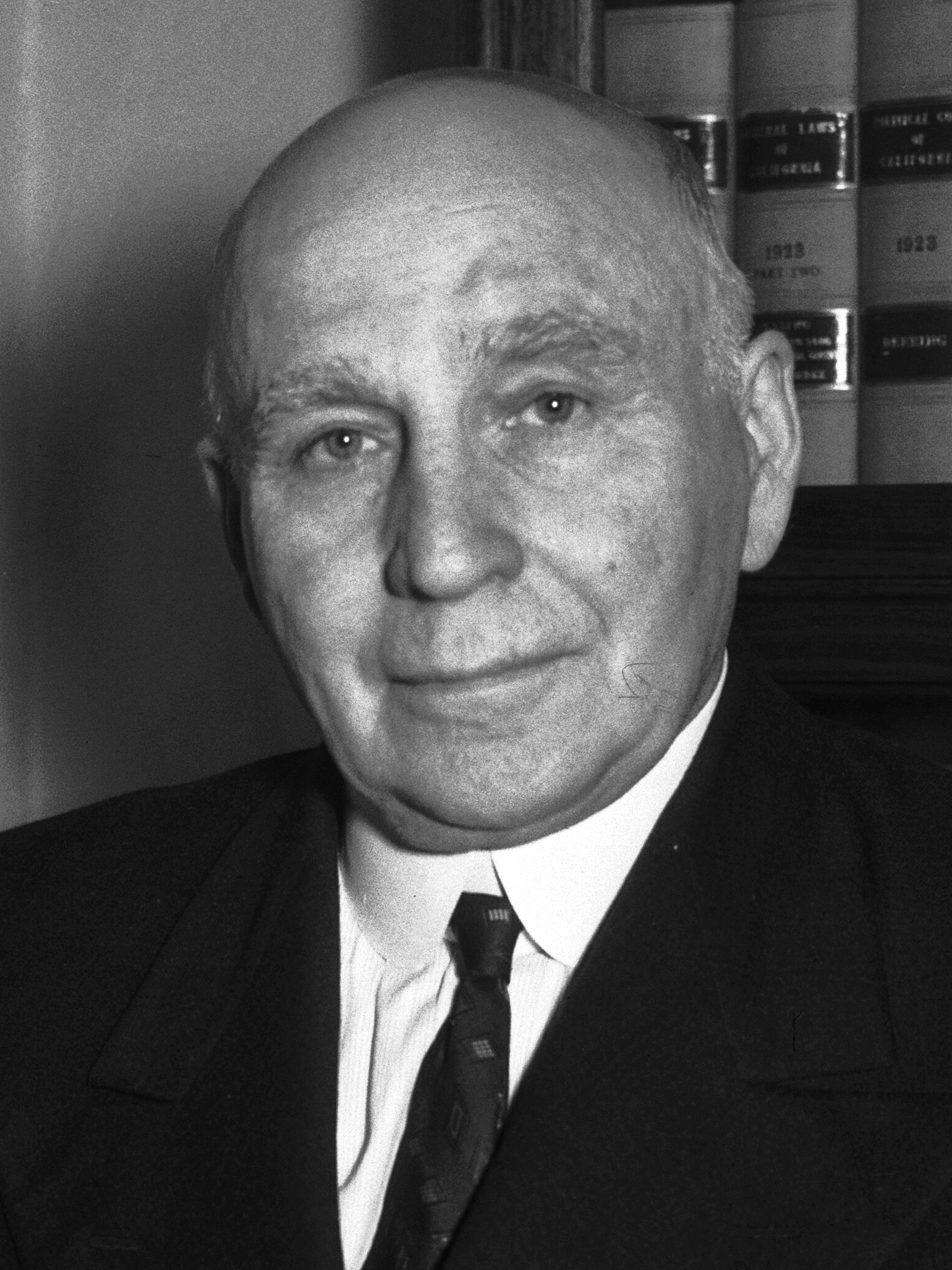
Nominee	Culbert Olson	Frank Merriam
Party	Democratic	Republican
Popular vote	1,391,734	1,171,019
Percentage	52.49%	44.17%
- County results Olson: 40–50% 50–60% Merriam: 40–50% 50–60% 70–80%
Governor before election
Frank Merriam
Republican
Elected Governor
Culbert Olson
Democratic

The 1938 California gubernatorial election was held on November 8, 1938. Culbert L. Olson defeated incumbent governor Frank F. Merriam to become the first Democrat elected Governor of California since James Budd in 1894. Merriam had angered the left and the right throughout his tenure as governor, leading a significant swing in favor of the Democratic party.

Olson was the first Democrat since George Stoneman in 1882 to receive an absolute majority of the vote. For the first time since 1882, Alameda County, Los Angeles County, and Ventura County were carried by a Democrat and San Diego County backed a Democrat for governor for the first time since 1879. California would not elect a Democrat as governor again until 1958. This was the last time until Gray Davis in 1998 that a Democrat who was not a member of the Brown family won the governorship.

== Republican primary ==
=== Candidates ===
- George J. Hatfield, lieutenant governor
- Z. S. Leymel, former mayor of Fresno
- Frank F. Merriam, incumbent governor
- Francis Michael O'Connor

=== Results ===
Republican primary results
Party	Candidate	Votes	%
Republican	Frank F. Merriam (incumbent)	405,362	54.85%
Republican	George J. Hatfield	169,278	22.91%
Republican	Raymond L. Haight	124,102	16.79%
Republican	Francis Michael O'Connor	18,642	2.52%
Republican	John F. Dockweiler (write-in)	8,966	1.21%
Republican	Z. S. Leymel	8,184	1.11%
Republican	Culbert L. Olson (write-in)	4,469	0.60%
Total votes		739,003	100.00%

== Democratic primary ==
=== Candidates ===
- John F. Dockweiler, U.S. Representative from Los Angeles
- Herbert C. Legg, Los Angeles County Supervisor
- Daniel C. Murphy
- William H. Neblett
- J. F. T. O'Connor, United States Comptroller of the Currency
- Culbert Olson, State Senator from Los Angeles
- Teodoro Antonio Tomasini

=== Results ===
Democratic primary results
Party	Candidate	Votes	%
Democratic	Culbert L. Olson	483,483	41.97%
Democratic	John F. Dockweiler	218,342	18.96%
Democratic	Daniel C. Murphy	137,740	11.96%
Democratic	Raymond L. Haight	125,012	10.85%
Democratic	Herbert C. Legg	80,586	7.00%
Democratic	J. F. T. O'Connor	71,999	6.25%
Democratic	William H. Neblett	21,219	1.84%
Democratic	Teodoro Antonio Tomasini	10,142	0.88%
Democratic	Frank F. Merriam (write-in)	3,340	0.29%
Total votes		1,151,863	100.00%

== Townsend Party primary ==
=== Results ===
Townsend primary results
Party	Candidate	Votes	%
Townsend Party	Frank F. Merriam (write-in) (Note: Was not listed under Townsend in the general election)	5,350	64.82%
Townsend Party	John F. Dockweiler (write-in)	1,471	17.82%
Townsend Party	Culbert L. Olson (write-in)	1,432	17.35%
Total votes		8,253	100.00%

== Progressive primary ==
=== Candidates ===
- Raymond L. Haight, Los Angeles attorney
- William E. Riker, white supremacist preacher

Progressive primary results
Party	Candidate	Votes	%
California Progressive Party	Raymond L. Haight	4,569	57.76%
California Progressive Party	Culbert L. Olson	3,271	40.09%
California Progressive Party	William E. Riker	170	2.15%
Total votes		7,910	100.00%

== Commonwealth primary ==
=== Candidates ===
- Robert Noble

=== Results ===
Commonwealth primary results
Party	Candidate	Votes	%
Commonwealth	Robert Noble	274	100.00%
Total votes		274	100.00%

== General election ==
=== Candidates ===
- Raymond L. Haight, Los Angeles attorney (Progressive)
- Frank F. Merriam, incumbent governor since 1937 (Republican)
- Robert Noble (Commonwealth)
- Culbert Olson, State Senator from Los Angeles (Democratic)

=== Results ===
1938 California gubernatorial election
Party	Candidate	Votes	%	±%
Democratic	Culbert L. Olson	1,391,734	52.49%	+14.74%
Republican	Frank F. Merriam (incumbent)	1,171,019	44.17%	−4.71%
Progressive Party (United States, 1924-46)	Raymond L. Haight	64,418	2.43%	−10.56%
Commonwealth	Robert Noble	23,787	0.90%	+0.90%
	Scattering	505	0.02%	
Majority		220,715	8.32%	
Total votes		2,651,463	100.00%	
Democratic gain from Republican		Swing	+19.45%	

=== Results by county ===
County	Culbert L. Olson Democratic		Frank F. Merriam Republican		Raymond L. Haight Progressive		Robert Noble Commonwealth		Scattering Write-in		Margin		Total votes cast
County	#	%	#	%	#	%	#	%	#	%	#	%	Total votes cast
Alameda	109,010	49.48%	106,694	48.43%	3,825	1.74%	753	0.34%	39	0.02%	2,316	1.05%	220,321
Alpine	29	18.95%	110	71.90%	14	9.15%	0	0.00%	0	0.00%	-81	-52.94%	153
Amador	1,803	52.47%	1,486	43.25%	132	3.84%	15	0.44%	0	0.00%	317	9.23%	3,436
Butte	8,408	48.45%	8,249	47.53%	542	3.12%	155	0.89%	0	0.00%	159	0.92%	17,354
Calaveras	1,818	46.44%	1,866	47.66%	207	5.29%	24	0.61%	0	0.00%	-48	-1.23%	3,915
Colusa	1,768	41.11%	2,339	54.38%	168	3.91%	26	0.60%	0	0.00%	-571	-13.28%	4,301
Contra Costa	23,782	56.82%	17,096	40.84%	835	1.99%	139	0.33%	4	0.01%	6,686	15.97%	41,856
Del Norte	1,092	43.58%	1,325	52.87%	73	2.91%	16	0.64%	0	0.00%	-233	-9.30%	2,506
El Dorado	3,375	57.23%	2,079	35.26%	402	6.82%	41	0.70%	0	0.00%	1,296	21.98%	5,897
Fresno	32,937	55.52%	22,728	38.31%	3,370	5.68%	294	0.50%	0	0.00%	10,209	17.21%	59,329
Glenn	2,068	39.88%	2,924	56.39%	168	3.24%	25	0.48%	0	0.00%	-856	-16.51%	5,185
Humboldt	8,795	46.00%	9,617	50.30%	571	2.99%	137	0.72%	0	0.00%	-822	-4.30%	19,120
Imperial	5,495	45.47%	6,259	51.79%	203	1.68%	129	1.07%	0	0.00%	-764	-6.32%	12,086
Inyo	1,184	42.44%	1,456	52.19%	135	4.84%	15	0.54%	0	0.00%	-272	-9.75%	2,790
Kern	25,392	58.66%	16,116	37.23%	1,332	3.08%	448	1.03%	1	0.00%	9,276	21.43%	43,289
Kings	5,545	53.35%	4,395	42.28%	359	3.45%	92	0.89%	3	0.03%	1,150	11.06%	10,394
Lake	1,571	37.72%	2,438	58.54%	91	2.18%	65	1.56%	0	0.00%	-867	-20.82%	4,165
Lassen	2,764	48.53%	2,624	46.08%	258	4.53%	49	0.86%	0	0.00%	140	2.46%	5,695
Los Angeles	612,499	55.76%	446,069	40.61%	24,958	2.27%	14,552	1.32%	339	0.03%	166,430	15.15%	1,098,417
Madera	4,148	57.11%	2,805	38.62%	273	3.76%	37	0.51%	0	0.00%	1,343	18.49%	7,263
Marin	8,340	43.46%	10,445	54.42%	351	1.83%	52	0.27%	4	0.02%	-2,105	-10.97%	19,192
Mariposa	1,362	54.50%	1,043	41.74%	59	2.36%	35	1.40%	0	0.00%	319	12.77%	2,499
Mendocino	5,355	45.92%	5,897	50.57%	286	2.45%	123	1.05%	0	0.00%	-542	-4.65%	11,661
Merced	8,303	54.05%	6,367	41.45%	547	3.56%	140	0.91%	4	0.03%	1,936	12.60%	15,361
Modoc	1,472	48.26%	1,416	46.43%	132	4.33%	30	0.98%	0	0.00%	56	1.84%	3,050
Mono	445	47.39%	446	47.50%	42	4.47%	6	0.64%	0	0.00%	-1	-0.11%	939
Monterey	9,736	44.82%	11,436	52.65%	428	1.97%	122	0.56%	0	0.00%	-1,700	-7.83%	21,722
Napa	4,786	42.03%	6,275	55.10%	261	2.29%	65	0.57%	1	0.01%	-1,489	-13.08%	11,388
Nevada	3,494	43.84%	4,052	50.84%	379	4.76%	45	0.56%	0	0.00%	-558	-7.00%	7,970
Orange	24,257	43.27%	29,774	53.11%	1,166	2.08%	863	1.54%	4	0.01%	-5,517	-9.84%	56,064
Placer	6,653	58.92%	3,834	33.96%	747	6.62%	57	0.50%	0	0.00%	2,819	24.97%	11,291
Plumas	2,373	56.25%	1,607	38.09%	198	4.69%	41	0.97%	0	0.00%	766	18.16%	4,219
Riverside	17,026	45.93%	18,895	50.97%	737	1.99%	409	1.10%	2	0.01%	-1,869	-5.04%	37,069
Sacramento	32,885	54.07%	25,836	42.48%	1,921	3.16%	174	0.29%	5	0.01%	7,049	11.59%	60,821
San Benito	1,910	42.25%	2,466	54.55%	124	2.74%	21	0.46%	0	0.00%	-556	-12.30%	4,521
San Bernardino	30,696	51.47%	27,515	46.14%	1,001	1.68%	409	0.69%	13	0.02%	3,181	5.33%	59,634
San Diego	54,552	52.84%	45,891	44.45%	1,749	1.69%	1,039	1.01%	2	0.00%	8,661	8.39%	103,233
San Francisco	132,346	53.36%	111,046	44.77%	3,843	1.55%	781	0.31%	19	0.01%	21,300	8.59%	248,035
San Joaquin	22,340	50.34%	20,990	47.30%	895	2.02%	147	0.33%	5	0.01%	1,350	3.04%	44,377
San Luis Obispo	6,660	45.91%	7,046	48.57%	608	4.19%	192	1.32%	0	0.00%	-386	-2.66%	14,506
San Mateo	20,723	47.85%	21,579	49.82%	801	1.85%	200	0.46%	8	0.02%	-856	-1.98%	43,311
Santa Barbara	10,870	41.81%	14,325	55.10%	689	2.65%	107	0.41%	5	0.02%	-3,455	-13.29%	25,996
Santa Clara	32,994	46.70%	36,191	51.23%	1,217	1.72%	226	0.32%	20	0.03%	-3,197	-4.53%	70,648
Santa Cruz	8,962	45.17%	10,198	51.40%	531	2.68%	150	0.76%	0	0.00%	-1,236	-6.23%	19,841
Shasta	4,994	56.26%	3,445	38.81%	344	3.88%	94	1.06%	0	0.00%	1,549	17.45%	8,877
Sierra	719	49.72%	565	39.07%	149	10.30%	13	0.90%	0	0.00%	154	10.65%	1,446
Siskiyou	5,882	48.97%	5,146	42.84%	794	6.61%	190	1.58%	0	0.00%	736	6.13%	12,012
Solano	9,037	50.92%	8,051	45.36%	586	3.30%	74	0.42%	0	0.00%	986	5.56%	17,748
Sonoma	12,207	42.25%	15,582	53.93%	957	3.31%	140	0.48%	9	0.03%	-3,375	-11.68%	28,895
Stanislaus	12,730	47.34%	12,333	45.86%	1,598	5.94%	226	0.84%	6	0.02%	397	1.48%	26,893
Sutter	3,093	43.97%	3,691	52.47%	224	3.18%	27	0.38%	0	0.00%	-598	-8.50%	7,035
Tehama	2,740	44.99%	2,882	47.32%	427	7.01%	41	0.67%	0	0.00%	-142	-2.33%	6,090
Trinity	1,081	53.36%	808	39.88%	107	5.28%	30	1.48%	0	0.00%	273	13.47%	2,026
Tulare	16,162	50.29%	14,571	45.34%	1,113	3.46%	283	0.88%	8	0.02%	1,591	4.95%	32,137
Tuolumne	2,672	53.80%	2,091	42.10%	168	3.38%	36	0.72%	0	0.00%	581	11.70%	4,967
Ventura	11,264	49.31%	10,647	46.61%	789	3.45%	139	0.61%	2	0.01%	617	2.70%	22,841
Yolo	3,997	43.28%	4,865	52.67%	352	3.81%	22	0.24%	0	0.00%	-868	-9.40%	9,236
Yuba	3,133	48.65%	3,097	48.09%	182	2.83%	26	0.40%	2	0.03%	36	0.56%	6,440
Total	1,391,734	52.49%	1,171,019	44.17%	64,418	2.43%	23,787	0.90%	505	0.02%	220,715	8.32%	2,651,463

=== Counties that flipped from Republican to Democratic ===
- Alameda
- Amador
- Butte
- Kern
- Kings
- Los Angeles
- Mariposa
- Merced
- Modoc
- Placer
- Sacramento
- San Bernardino
- San Diego
- San Francisco
- San Joaquin
- Shasta
- Sierra
- Siskiyou
- Solano
- Tulare
- Ventura
- Yuba

=== Counties that flipped from Progressive to Democratic ===
- El Dorado
- Fresno
- Stanislaus
