= 1934 California gubernatorial election =

- November 6, 1934
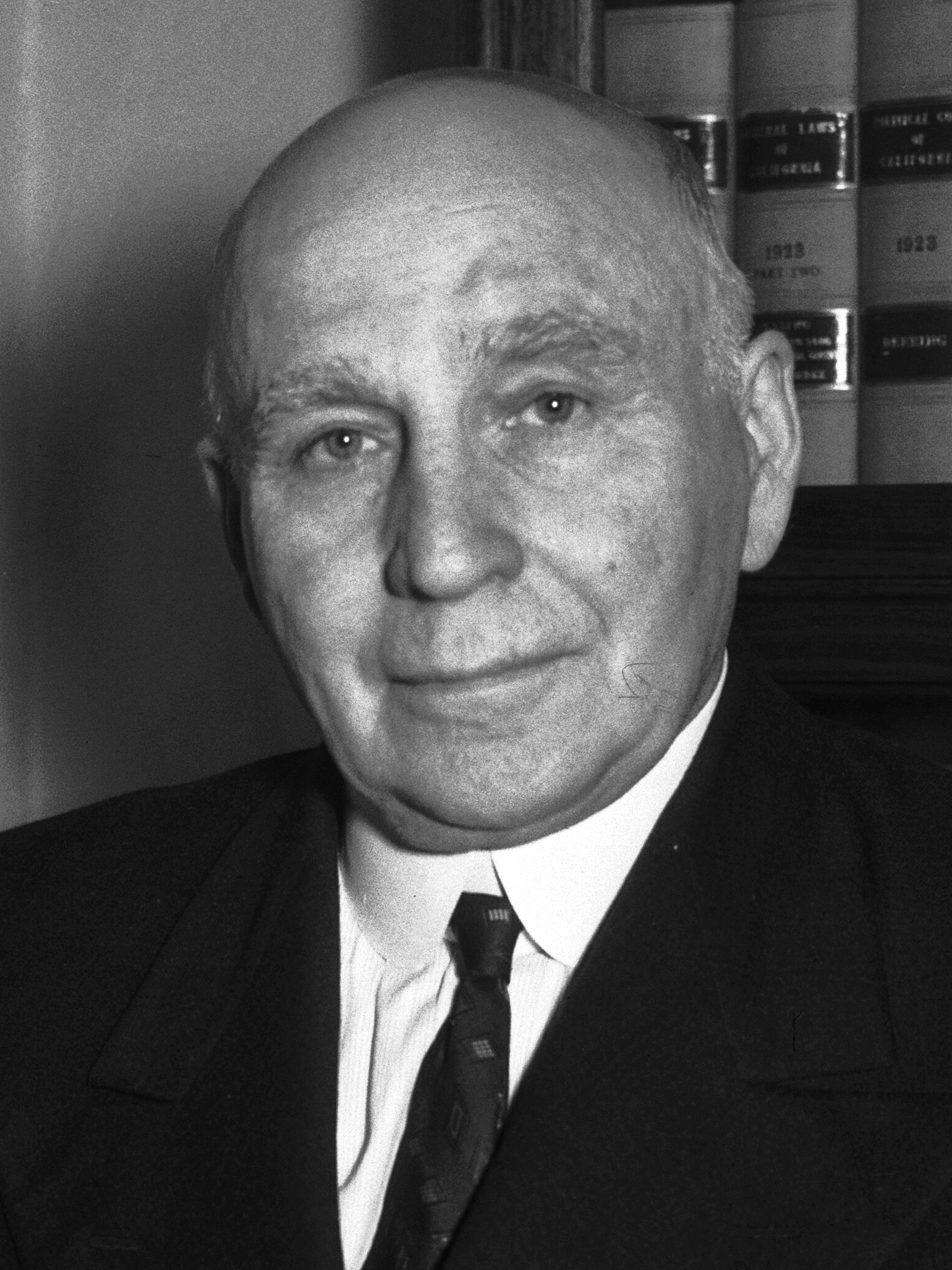

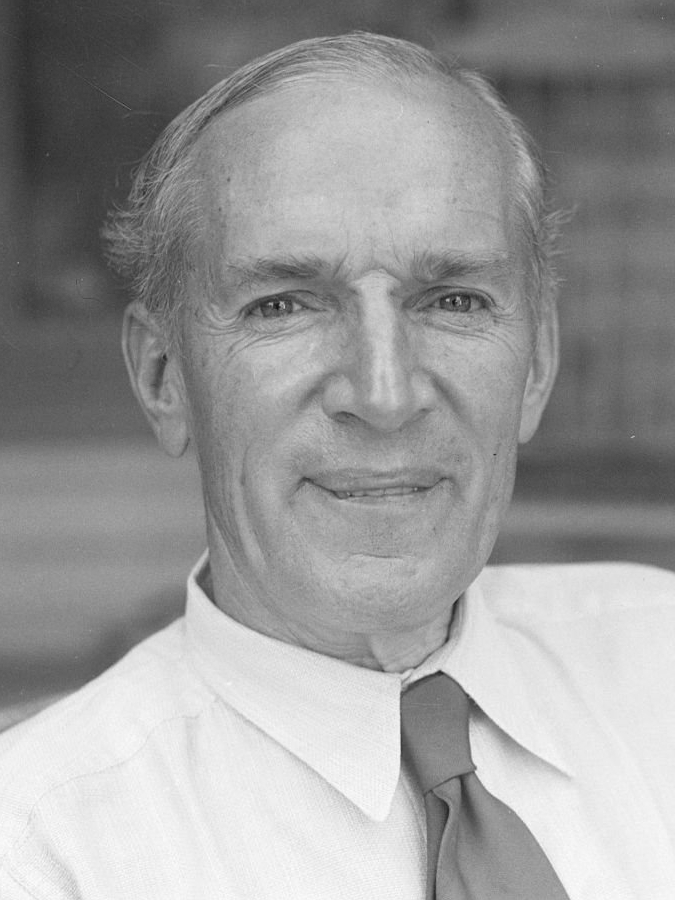

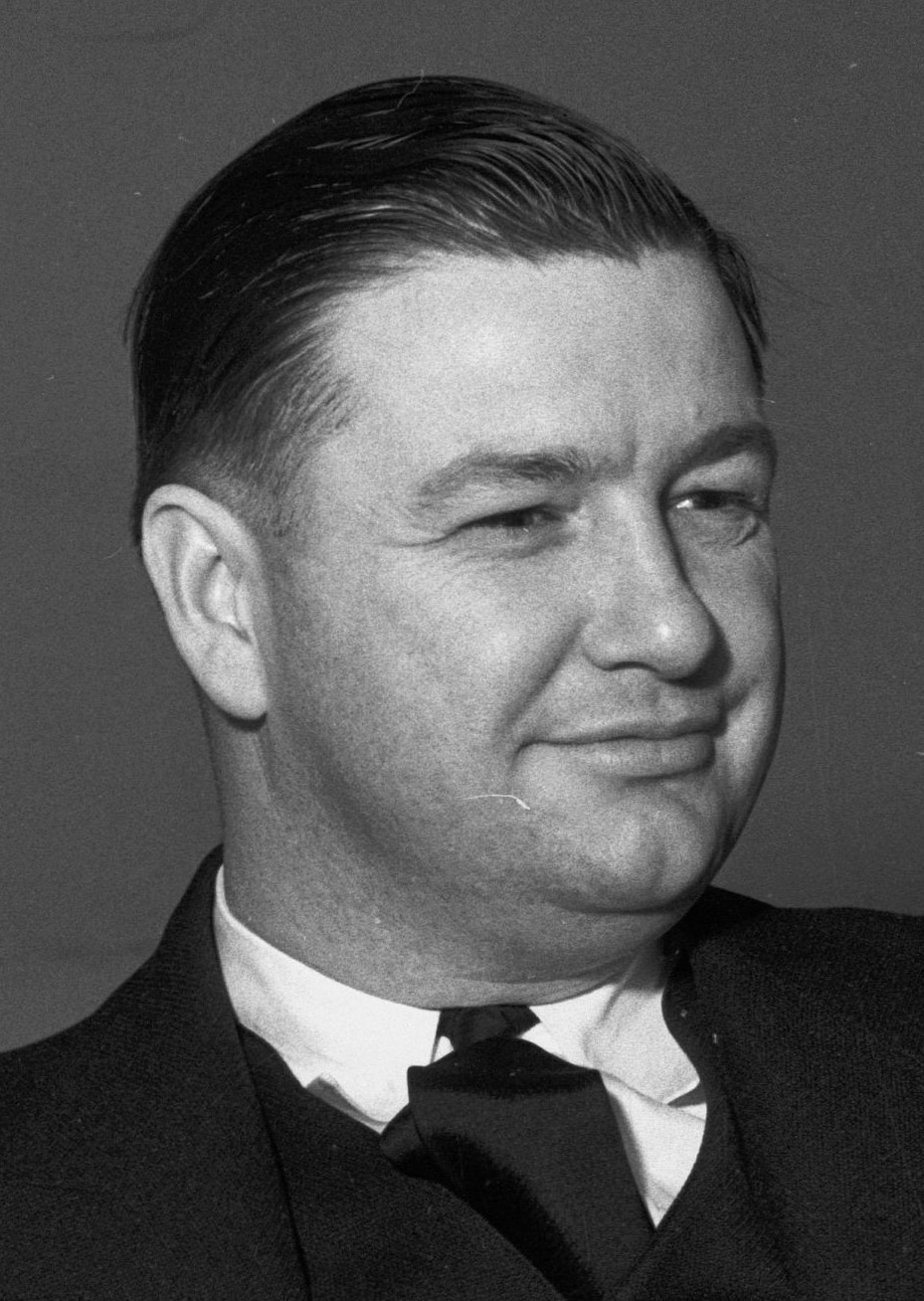
Nominee	Frank Merriam	Upton Sinclair	Raymond L. Haight
Party	Republican	Democratic	Commonwealth
Alliance			Progressive
Popular vote	1,138,620	879,537	302,519
Percentage	48.87%	37.75%	12.99%
- County results Merriam: 30–40% 40–50% 50–60 60–70% 80–90% Sinclair: 30–40% 40–50% Haight: 30–40%
Governor before election
Frank Merriam
Republican
Elected Governor
Frank Merriam
Republican

The 1934 California gubernatorial election was held on November 6, 1934. Incumbent governor Frank Merriam was elected to a full term in office over Upton Sinclair and Raymond L. Haight. Held in the midst of the Great Depression, the 1934 election was amongst the most controversial in the state's political history. Much of the campaign's emphasis was directed at Sinclair's End Poverty in California movement, proposing interventionist reforms to cure the state's ailing economy. Merriam, who had recently assumed the governorship following the death of James Rolph, characterized Sinclair's proposal as a step towards communism.

Merriam had succeeded to the office upon the death of James Rolph on June 2. He won the Republican nomination for a full term in the primary over former governor C. C. Young, Los Angeles County supervisor John R. Quinn, and attorney Raymond L. Haight. Merriam also won the endorsement of the Prohibition Party as a write-in candidate, while Haight was nominated by the Commonwealth and Progressive parties. In the Democratic primary, author Upton Sinclair upset the party establishment by defeating eminent journalist George Creel.

In the general election, Merriam received significant support from major Hollywood studio executives, who pioneered campaign film techniques in opposition to Sinclair. Anti-Sinclair films included depictions of his supporters as criminals and bums, and aired in California movie theatres with no opportunity for response. The effort has been described as Hollywood's first intervention in electoral politics and was later depicted in the 2020 film Mank. Sinclair was also opposed by major corporations and corporate interest groups, such as Standard Oil of California, Pacific Mutual, and the California Real Estate Association, and all major California newspapers. Ultimately, Merriam won by over 250,000 votes.

== Republican primary ==
=== Candidates ===
- Raymond L. Haight, Los Angeles attorney
- Frank Merriam, incumbent Governor since June 1934
- John R. Quinn, member, Los Angeles County Board of Supervisors
- C. C. Young, former Governor (1927–31)

=== Results ===
Primary results by county Merriam: Merriam—60–70%; Merriam—50–60%; Merriam—40–50%; Merriam—30–40%; Young: Young—60–70%; Young—50–60%; Young—40–50%; Young—30–40%; Quinn: Quinn—50–60%; Quinn—40–50%; Quinn—30–40%

Republican primary results
Party	Candidate	Votes	%
Republican	Frank F. Merriam (incumbent)	346,329	41.94%
Republican	C. C. Young	231,431	28.03%
Republican	John R. Quinn	153,412	18.58%
Republican	Raymond L. Haight	84,977	10.29%
Republican	Upton Sinclair (write-in)	9,651	1.17%
Total votes		825,800	100.00%

== Democratic primary ==
=== Candidates ===
- George Creel, investigative journalist
- Forest Dowey
- William H. Evans
- Z. T. Malaby
- W. J. McNichols
- Upton Sinclair, author and perennial Socialist Party candidate
- James E. Waddell
- Justus S. Wardell, nominee for Governor in 1926
- Milton K. Young, nominee for Governor in 1930

=== Results ===
Sinclair won the Democratic nomination in what was considered a political upset.

Primary results by county Sinclair: Sinclair—70–80%; Sinclair—60–70%; Sinclair—50–60%; Sinclair—40–50%; Sinclair—30–40%; Creel: Creel—60–70%; Creel—50–60%; Creel—40–50%; Creel—30–40%

Democratic primary results
Party	Candidate	Votes	%
Democratic	Upton Sinclair	436,220	51.68%
Democratic	George Creel	288,106	34.13%
Democratic	Justus S. Wardell	48,965	5.80%
Democratic	Milton K. Young	41,609	4.93%
Democratic	James E. Waddell	12,515	1.48%
Democratic	Z. T. Malaby	4,476	0.53%
Democratic	Forest Dowey	4,260	0.50%
Democratic	W. J. McNichols	3,616	0.43%
Democratic	William H. Evans	2,433	0.29%
Democratic	Frank F. Merriam (write-in)	1,035	0.12%
Democratic	Raymond L. Haight (write-in)	882	0.10%
Total votes		844,117	100.00%

== Minor party primaries ==
=== Socialist ===
Primary results by county Dempster: Demptster—100%; No vote: No vote

Socialist primary results
Party	Candidate	Votes	%
Socialist	Milen C. Dempster	2,521	100.00%
Total votes		2,521	100.00%

=== Commonwealth ===
Primary results by county Haight: Haight—100%; No vote: No vote

Commonwealth primary results
Party	Candidate	Votes	%
Commonwealth	Raymond L. Haight	2,421	100.00%
Total votes		2,421	100.00%

=== Progressive ===
Primary results by county Haight: Haight—100%; No vote: No vote

Progressive primary results
Party	Candidate	Votes	%
California Progressive Party	Raymond L. Haight	1,344	100.00%
Total votes		1,344	100.00%

=== Prohibition ===
Primary results by county Merriam: Merriam—100%; Merriam—70–80%; Merriam—60–70%; Merriam—50–60%; Sinclair: Sinclair—100%; Sinclair—70–80%; Sinclair—60–70%; Tie: Tie-50%; No vote: No vote

Prohibition primary results
Party	Candidate	Votes	%
Prohibition	Frank F. Merriam (write-in) (Note: Was not listed under Prohibition in the general election)	963	76.43%
Prohibition	Upton Sinclair (write-in)	297	23.57%
Total votes		1,260	100.00%

=== Communist ===
Primary results by county Darcy: Darcy—100%; No vote: No vote

Communist primary results
Party	Candidate	Votes	%
Communist	Sam Darcy	1,072	100.00%
Total votes		1,072	100.00%

== General election ==
=== Campaign ===
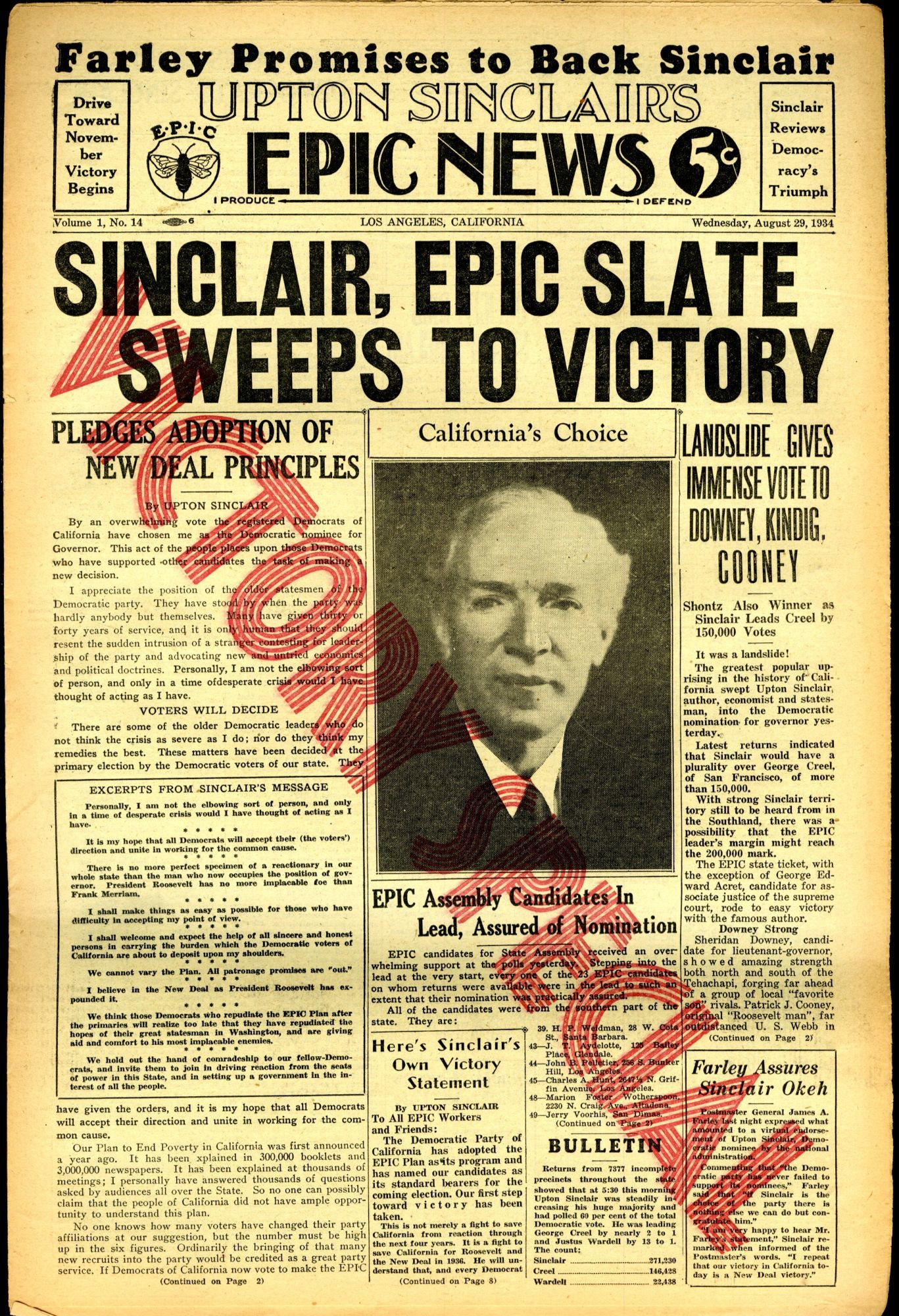
Front page of EPIC News following Sinclair's primary victory, August 29, 1934

Negative campaigning funded by the film industry was used against Sinclair to favor the Merriam campaign. Hollywood studio bosses unanimously opposed Sinclair and their involvement in the campaign has been described as Hollywood's first intervention in electoral politics. They pressured their employees to assist and vote for Merriam's campaign, and made false propaganda films attacking Sinclair, giving him no opportunity to respond. Joseph M. Schenck threatened to move Twentieth Century Fox to Florida should Sinclair be elected.

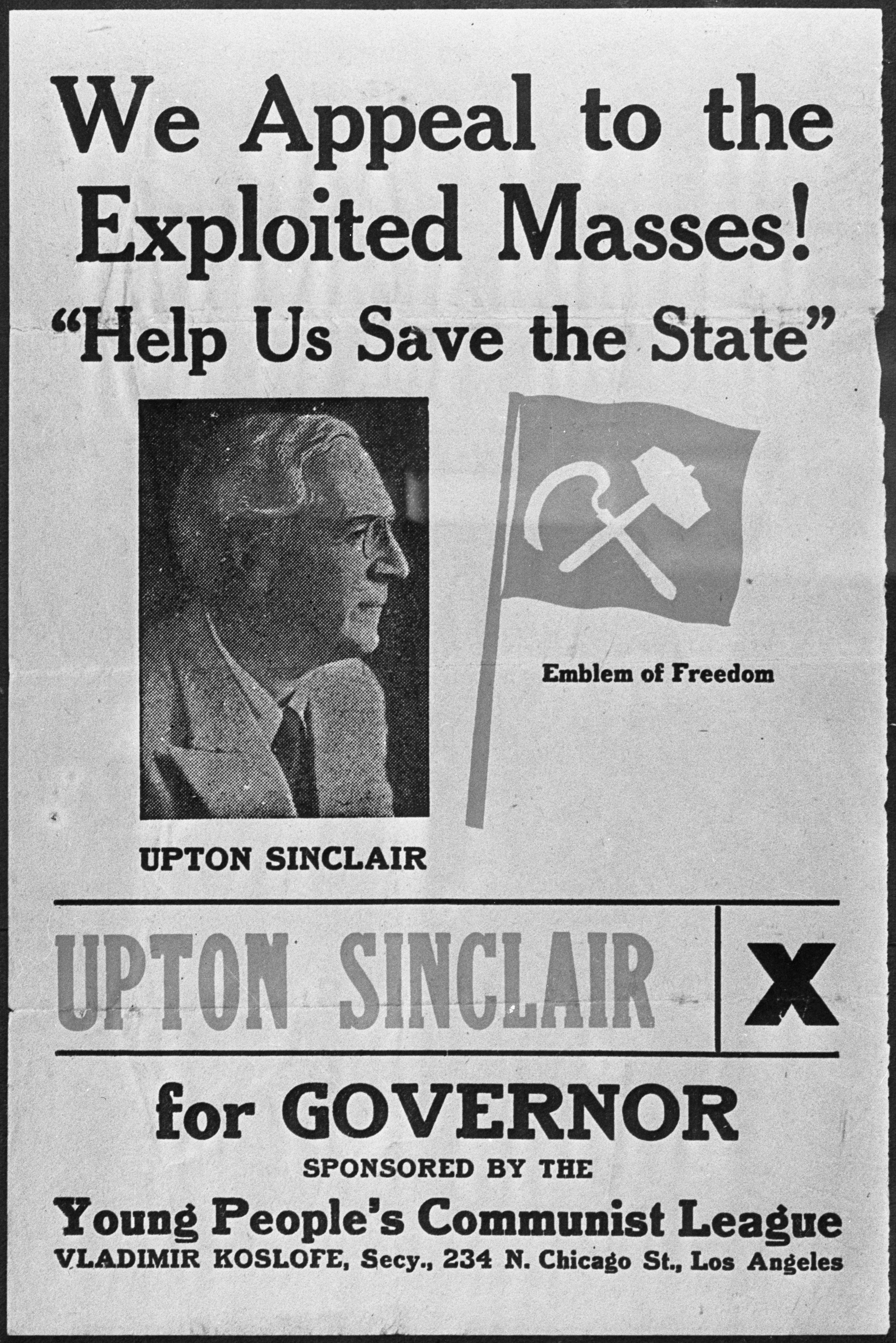
A fake campaign poster, claiming to be from the Young Communist League, pledging support to Sinclair

Louis B. Mayer's MGM and other film studios deducted a day's pay from their employees to raise an anti-Sinclair fund that amounted to $500,000. Irving Thalberg was to lead MGM's anti-Sinclair campaign and the studio recruited Carey Wilson to create a series of anti-Sinclair propaganda films. These films, directed by Felix E. Feist, included fake newsreels of Sinclair supporters who were portrayed as bums and criminals. They were shown in California movie theaters, with one episode featuring hired actors as Sinclair supporters speaking with foreign accents. Supposedly when one actor objected to the films Thalberg replied "Nothing is unfair in politics".

Big corporations in California were strongly opposed to Sinclair. Both Standard Oil of California and Pacific Mutual sent out a letter to their stockholders encouraging them to oppose Sinclair. Various corporations created front organizations to oppose his campaign, for instance the California Real Estate Association formed the 'Merriam for Governor Committee'.

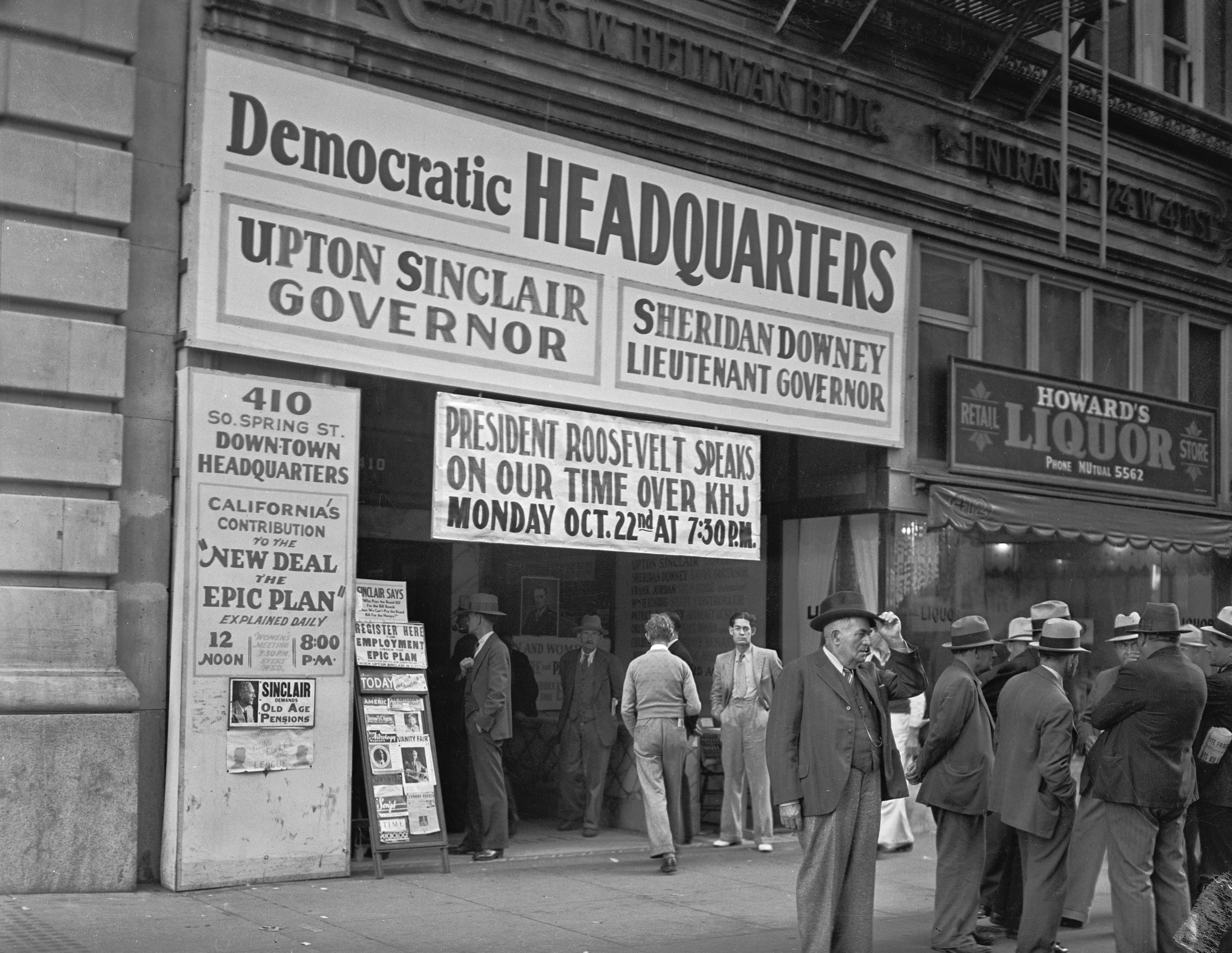
Democratic headquarters in Downtown Los Angeles during the campaign, October 1934

Sinclair later stated that there was a "campaign of lying" against him during the campaign which was "ordered by the biggest businessmen in California and paid for with millions of dollars" that was carried out by newspapers, politicians, advertisers, and the film industry. One survey of over 500 California newspapers found that over 90% supported Merriam, 5% supported Raymond Haight and the rest made no endorsement. The only newspaper surveyed that endorsed Sinclair was his own outlet Epic News.

However, Sinclair did have support from some public figures. For instance, the 'Author's League for Sinclair' was founded by Frank Scully, Dorothy Thompson and Gene Fowler. Progressives such as Charlie Chaplin, Dorothy Parker, Donald Ogden Stewart, Lillian Hellman and Groucho Marx were also Sinclair supporters.

Haight campaigned as a centrist between the right-wing Merriam and the leftist Sinclair, seeking support from voters dissatisfied with both candidates. Haight garnered 302,519 votes, or 13% of the vote. Much of his voting strength came from the San Joaquin Valley, where farmers were suspicious of Sinclair's End Poverty in California scheme to take over so-called 'idle farms'.

=== Candidates ===
- Sam Darcy, organizer for the Marine Workers Industrial Union and 1934 waterfront strike (Communist)
- Milen C. Dempster (Socialist)
- Raymond L. Haight, Los Angeles attorney (Commonwealth-Progressive)
- Frank F. Merriam, incumbent Governor since June 1934 (Republican)
- Upton Sinclair, author and perennial Socialist Party candidate (Democratic)

=== Results ===
1934 California gubernatorial election
Party	Candidate	Votes	%	±%
Republican	Frank F. Merriam (incumbent)	1,138,620	48.87%	−23.28%
Democratic	Upton Sinclair	879,537	37.75%	+13.64%
California Progressive Party	Raymond L. Haight	302,519	12.99%	+12.99%
Communist	Sam Darcy	5,826	0.25%	+0.25%
Socialist	Milen C. Dempster	2,947	0.13%	−3.52%
	Scattering	273	0.01%	
Majority		259,083	11.12%	
Total votes		2,329,722	100.00%	
Republican hold		Swing	-36.93%	

==== Results by county ====
County	Frank F. Merriam Republican		Upton Sinclair Democratic		Raymond L. Haight Commonwealth/Progressive		Sam Darcy Communist		Milen C. Dempster Socialist		Scattering Write-in		Margin		Total votes cast
County	#	%	#	%	#	%	#	%	#	%	#	%	#	%	Total votes cast
Alameda	102,328	52.68%	73,233	37.70%	17,758	9.14%	581	0.30%	291	0.15%	41	0.02%	29,095	14.98%	194,232
Alpine	158	87.29%	13	7.18%	10	5.52%	0	0.00%	0	0.00%	0	0.00%	145	80.11%	181
Amador	1,946	52.00%	981	26.22%	802	21.43%	9	0.24%	4	0.11%	0	0.00%	965	25.79%	3,742
Butte	8,041	47.82%	5,932	35.28%	2,795	16.62%	29	0.17%	18	0.11%	0	0.00%	2,109	12.54%	16,815
Calaveras	1,524	45.83%	1,232	37.05%	553	16.63%	8	0.24%	5	0.15%	3	0.09%	292	8.78%	3,325
Colusa	2,584	55.70%	861	18.56%	1,179	25.41%	8	0.17%	7	0.15%	0	0.00%	1,405 (Note: Margin over Haight)	30.29%	4,639
Contra Costa	15,540	45.52%	15,591	45.67%	2,894	8.48%	80	0.23%	28	0.08%	7	0.02%	-51	-0.15%	34,140
Del Norte	1,221	49.39%	1,106	44.74%	129	5.22%	4	0.16%	12	0.49%	0	0.00%	115	4.65%	2,472
El Dorado	1,744	33.37%	1,681	32.17%	1,766	33.79%	23	0.44%	12	0.23%	0	0.00%	-22	-0.42%	5,226
Fresno	15,338	30.46%	15,509	30.80%	19,296	38.33%	101	0.20%	101	0.20%	2	0.00%	-3,787 (Note: Margin over Sinclair)	-7.53%	50,347
Glenn	2,342	46.00%	1,456	28.60%	1,286	25.26%	2	0.04%	5	0.10%	0	0.00%	886	17.40%	5,091
Humboldt	9,179	50.95%	6,448	35.79%	2,271	12.61%	79	0.44%	38	0.21%	0	0.00%	2,731	15.16%	18,015
Imperial	7,253	52.01%	5,637	40.42%	1,001	7.18%	17	0.12%	38	0.27%	0	0.00%	1,616	11.59%	13,946
Inyo	1,514	57.39%	877	33.24%	232	8.79%	11	0.42%	4	0.15%	0	0.00%	637	24.15%	2,638
Kern	14,798	48.59%	11,348	37.26%	4,197	13.78%	49	0.16%	60	0.20%	2	0.01%	3.450	11.33%	30,454
Kings	3,633	41.18%	2,326	26.37%	2,848	32.28%	5	0.06%	9	0.10%	1	0.01%	785	8.90%	8,822
Lake	2,317	56.54%	1,338	32.65%	433	10.57%	1	0.02%	9	0.22%	0	0.00%	979	23.89%	4,098
Lassen	1,697	33.09%	2,023	39.44%	1,382	26.94%	6	0.12%	21	0.41%	0	0.00%	-326	-6.36%	5,129
Los Angeles	457,755	47.45%	405,331	42.02%	98,348	10.20%	2,238	0.23%	822	0.09%	142	0.01%	52,424	5.43%	964,636
Madera	2,204	32.84%	2,441	36.37%	2,043	30.44%	16	0.24%	8	0.12%	0	0.00%	-237	-3.53%	6,712
Marin	9,756	54.50%	6,494	36.28%	1,555	8.69%	43	0.24%	49	0.27%	5	0.03%	3,262	18.22%	17,902
Mariposa	1,089	46.80%	865	37.17%	354	15.21%	7	0.30%	12	0.52%	0	0.00%	224	9.63%	2,327
Mendocino	6,178	62.87%	2,763	28.12%	794	8.08%	68	0.69%	23	0.23%	1	0.01%	3,415	34.75%	9,827
Merced	4,123	35.52%	3,727	32.10%	3,727	32.10%	18	0.16%	13	0.11%	1	0.01%	396	3.41%	11,609
Modoc	1,452	49.39%	836	28.44%	637	21.67%	5	0.17%	10	0.34%	0	0.00%	616	20.95%	2,940
Mono	520	63.11%	234	28.40%	64	7.77%	1	0.12%	5	0.61%	0	0.00%	286	34.71%	824
Monterey	11,083	61.53%	5,585	31.01%	1,285	7.13%	40	0.22%	16	0.09%	4	0.02%	5,498	30.52%	18,013
Napa	5,750	58.96%	2,806	28.77%	1,175	12.05%	11	0.11%	11	0.11%	0	0.00%	2,944	30.19%	9,753
Nevada	3,163	45.33%	2,165	31.03%	1,602	22.96%	28	0.40%	19	0.27%	0	0.00%	998	14.30%	6,977
Orange	27,099	53.73%	14,092	27.94%	9,142	18.13%	59	0.12%	42	0.08%	4	0.01%	13,007	25.79%	50,438
Placer	3,337	34.23%	3,113	31.93%	3,271	33.55%	16	0.16%	13	0.13%	0	0.00%	66	0.68%	9,750
Plumas	1,213	36.64%	1,226	37.03%	858	25.91%	2	0.06%	12	0.36%	0	0.00%	-13	-0.39%	3,311
Riverside	19,892	62.33%	9,896	31.01%	2,072	6.49%	31	0.10%	24	0.08%	0	0.00%	9,996	31.32%	31,915
Sacramento	19,360	35.75%	16,291	30.09%	18,310	33.81%	133	0.25%	51	0.09%	3	0.01%	1,050	1.94%	54,148
San Benito	2,931	65.25%	1,251	27.85%	296	6.59%	6	0.13%	8	0.18%	0	0.00%	1,680	37.40%	4,492
San Bernardino	30,285	56.76%	19,157	35.90%	3,774	7.07%	80	0.15%	57	0.11%	6	0.01%	11,128	20.85%	53,359
San Diego	44,422	50.76%	32,073	36.65%	10,759	12.29%	185	0.21%	69	0.08%	0	0.00%	12,349	14.11%	87,508
San Francisco	115,047	50.91%	87,850	38.88%	21,499	9.51%	1,116	0.49%	433	0.19%	32	0.01%	27,197	12.04%	225,977
San Joaquin	17,612	46.64%	13,720	36.33%	6,255	16.56%	70	0.19%	104	0.28%	0	0.00%	3,892	10.31%	37,761
San Luis Obispo	6,422	47.11%	5,093	37.36%	2,063	15.13%	34	0.25%	19	0.14%	0	0.00%	1,329	9.75%	13,631
San Mateo	18,448	52.29%	13,022	36.91%	3,669	10.40%	92	0.26%	40	0.11%	6	0.02%	5,426	15.38%	35,277
Santa Barbara	14,429	60.29%	7,735	32.32%	1,702	7.11%	53	0.22%	11	0.05%	2	0.01%	6,694	27.97%	23,932
Santa Clara	37,156	60.06%	19,281	31.17%	5,215	8.43%	107	0.17%	100	0.16%	2	0.00%	17,875	28.90%	61,861
Santa Cruz	10,905	63.17%	5,155	29.86%	1,119	6.48%	74	0.43%	8	0.05%	3	0.02%	5,750	33.31%	17,264
Shasta	3,283	42.75%	2,819	36.71%	1,543	20.09%	7	0.09%	28	0.36%	0	0.00%	464	6.04%	7,680
Sierra	676	45.19%	471	31.48%	339	22.66%	2	0.13%	7	0.47%	1	0.07%	205	13.70%	1,496
Siskiyou	4,202	39.19%	3,514	32.77%	2,953	27.54%	16	0.15%	37	0.35%	0	0.00%	688	6.42%	10,722
Solano	6,728	44.57%	5,112	33.87%	3,206	21.24%	29	0.19%	19	0.13%	0	0.00%	1,616	10.71%	15,094
Sonoma	15,329	57.41%	8,164	30.58%	3,070	11.50%	90	0.34%	43	0.16%	3	0.01%	7,165	26.84%	26,699
Stanislaus	7,853	34.46%	6,260	27.47%	8,592	37.70%	18	0.08%	64	0.28%	1	0.00%	-739	-3.24%	22,788
Sutter	2,872	47.01%	1,980	32.41%	1,244	20.36%	8	0.13%	5	0.08%	0	0.00%	892	14.60%	6,109
Tehama	2,865	44.34%	1,816	28.10%	1,763	27.28%	7	0.11%	11	0.17%	0	0.00%	1,049	16.23%	6,462
Trinity	889	40.21%	993	44.91%	308	13.93%	13	0.59%	8	0.36%	0	0.00%	-104	-4.70%	2,211
Tulare	9,850	37.46%	6,867	26.12%	9,512	36.18%	46	0.17%	18	0.07%	1	0.00%	338	1.29%	26,294
Tuolumne	1,580	36.62%	1,940	44.96%	785	18.19%	0	0.00%	10	0.23%	0	0.00%	-360	-8.34%	4,315
Ventura	11,015	54.07%	6,560	32.20%	2,740	13.45%	29	0.14%	26	0.13%	0	0.00%	4,455	21.87%	20,370
Yolo	4,087	46.44%	1,646	18.70%	3,041	34.56%	12	0.14%	14	0.16%	0	0.00%	1,046	11.89%	8,800
Yuba	2,603	49.81%	1,601	30.64%	1,003	19.19%	3	0.06%	16	0.31%	0	0.00%	1,002	19.17%	5,226
Total	1,138,620	48.87%	879,537	37.75%	302,519	12.99%	5,826	0.25%	2,947	0.13%	273	0.01%	259,083	11.12%	2,329,722

==== Counties that flipped from Republican to Democratic ====
- Contra Costa
- Lassen
- Madera
- Plumas
- Trinity
- Tuolumne

==== Counties that flipped from Republican to Progressive ====
- El Dorado
- Fresno
- Stanislaus

== Aftermath and legacy ==
Hollywood involvement in the campaign against Sinclair was depicted in the 2020 American biographical drama film Mank.
