= Laura de Turczynowicz =

Canadian opera singer

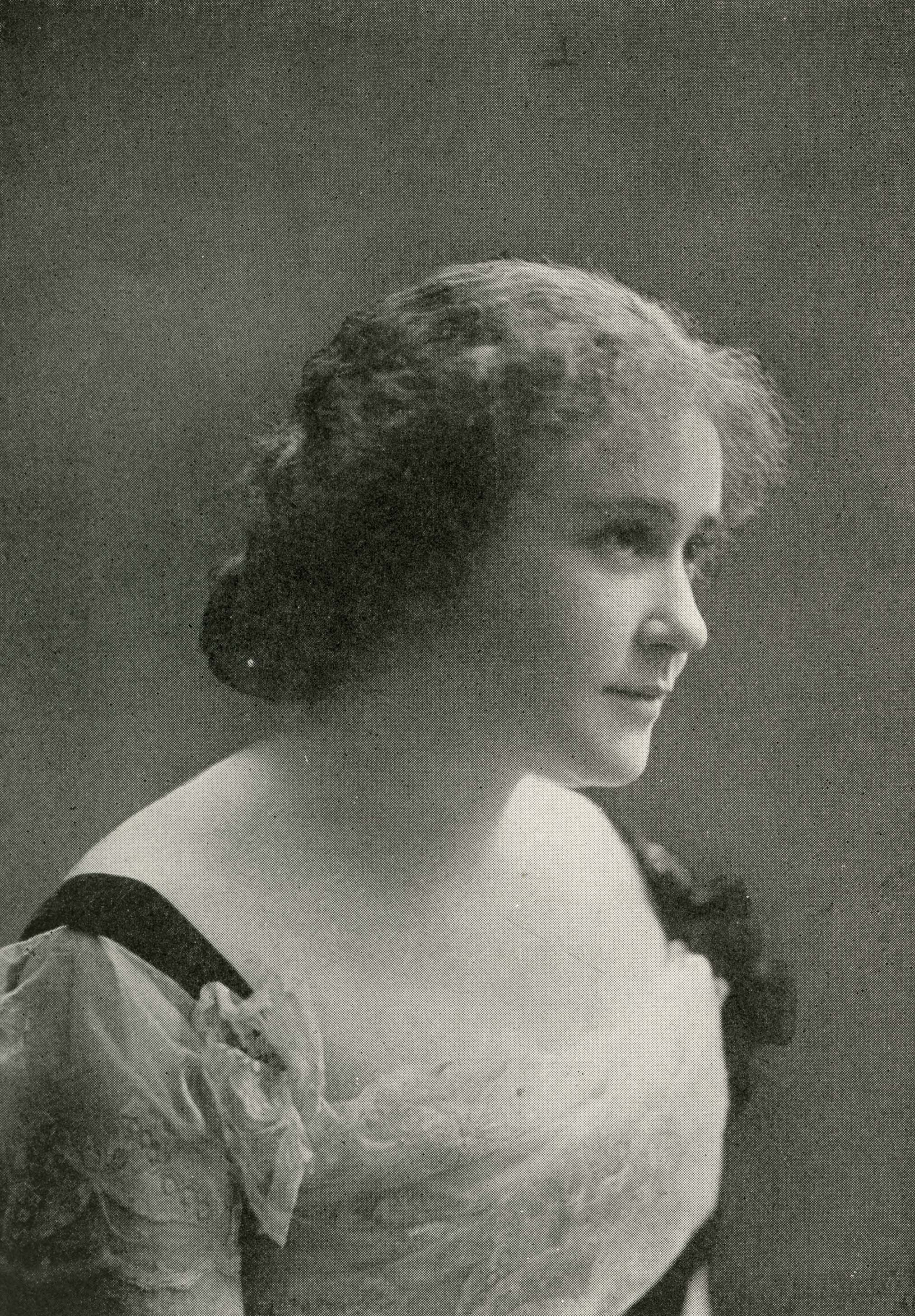
- Born: August 28, 1878; St. Catharines, Ontario, Canada
- Died: October 25, 1953 (aged 75); Santa Monica, California, U.S.
- Occupations: Opera singer; Theater producer; Theater director
- Children: 3

Laura de Turczynowicz née Laura Christine Blackwell (28 August 1878 – 25 October 1953) was an operatic singer, theatre producer and director, notable for her charitable works during and after World War I, and an autobiography of her wartime experience in Poland.

== Biography ==
Laura Christine Blackwell was born on 28 August 1878 in St. Catharines, Ontario. She travelled to New York, Germany and Poland to pursue her career in the theater. It was in Krakow where she married Stanisław Turczynowicz. She claimed that he was count of Gozdawa coat of arms, thus claiming the noble title Laura de Turczynowicz, Countess of Gozdawa coat of arms. The couple had a daughter (Wanda Jolanda) and twin sons (Stanislaw Piotr and Wladislaw Pawel).

It was not long after her children were born that World War I broke out. Turczynowicz was a prisoner in her home to the Germans for eight months, during which time, one of her sons suffered from typhus. During this time, General Paul von Hindenburg of the German army commandeered her home, which left them prisoners in their own home. Laura de Turczynowicz and her three children were later granted an American passport when she was recognized by a member of the embassy in Berlin. She travelled to Holland and on to America. She never discovered what happened to her husband and never returned to Poland.

Once back in the United States, Turczynowicz created the Polish Grey Samaritans (initially led by Martha Chickering), a group of women focused on training to aid those in war torn Poland and Lithuania. The women were Polish American and worked with the YWCA to train before being sent to communities in need of assistance in Poland. She traveled in the United States and Canada to address the public about the need for assistance with the Polish War Relief and the Russian Red Cross. Laura de Turczynowicz also wrote a book describing her time in Poland during World War I. The work was titled When the Prussians Came to Poland, published in 1916.

Later in her career, Turczynowicz returned to Toronto, Ontario, to direct for the Toronto Conservatory of Music, where she worked for two years before leaving in 1929. She moved on to Victoria, British Columbia, where she founded the Victoria Operatic Society in 1930, producing five operas. Finally, Laura de Turczynowicz lived and worked in Santa Monica, California, until her death in 1953.

== Works ==
- When the Prussians came to Poland; the experiences of an American woman during the German invasion (1916)
