= Sheppard Mullin =

International law firm based in Los Angeles

Sheppard, Mullin, Richter & Hampton LLP
- Headquarters: 2Cal; Los Angeles
- No. of offices: 16 total, 4 international
- No. of attorneys: Over 1,200 (2026)
- No. of employees: Over 1,800
- Major practice areas: Corporate law, litigation, regulatory matters, and industry-focused practices including healthcare, technology, and financial services
- Key people: Lucantonio Salvi, Chairman
- Revenue: ▲$1.38 billion (2025)
- Date founded: 1927
- Company type: Limited liability partnership

Sheppard, Mullin, Richter & Hampton LLP, often abbreviated as Sheppard, is an international law firm headquartered in Los Angeles. It maintains offices across North America, Europe, and Asia. Founded in 1927, the firm includes 10 major practice areas ranging from Antitrust to Tax, and also industry-focused teams such as Entertainment, Healthcare, and Privacy & Security.

== History ==
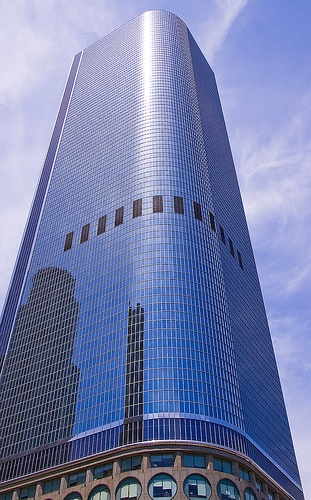
Sheppard's headquarters building, 2C fka Two California Plaza, Los Angeles

The firm was founded as Haight & Mathes by Bill Mathes and Raymond Haight in downtown Los Angeles.

With the addition of James Sheppard (Mathes' law school roommate) in 1928, the firm was renamed to Haight, Mathes & Sheppard. The same year, the firm relocated down Spring Street to the Rowan Building.

From 1932 to 1963, the firm saw several changes: Haight left the firm in 1932, and J. Stanley Mullin and George R. Richter joined (initially as law clerks). In 1945, Mathes was appointed to the US District Court in Los Angeles by President Truman. His departure, and the previous addition of Gordon Hampton in 1938, led to the firm's current name: Sheppard, Mullin, Richter & Hampton.

In 1975 the firm outgrew its space in the Rowan Building and relocated to the Security Pacific Building (now the Bank of America Building). In December 2024, the firm relocated to the 2Cal building at 350 South Grand Avenue. James Sheppard served as California State Bar President from 1960 to 1961 and died in 1964. By 2002, all the eponymous partners had died. The firm added 5 additional offices in California and in 2003 opened offices in New York and Washington, D.C. By 2017, it had expanded its nationwide offices and added international offices in Shanghai, Brussels, London, and Seoul, for a total of 12 US and 4 international offices as of January 2025.

== Revenue and profitability ==
Sheppard has consistently ranked in the AmLaw Top 100 Law Firms by Revenue, as well as the AmLaw Top 100 Law Firms by PPP (Profits per Partner); in 2021, the firm placed within the top 50 by Revenue.

The firm has seen gross revenue increase year-over-year since 1990. In 2020, its total revenue increased to over $850m, and it exceeded $1 billion for the first time in 2021. Sheppard's gross revenue for fiscal year 2025, was $1.38 billion, roughly up 13.7% from $1.21 billion in 2024.
