= Martha Chickering =

American social worker

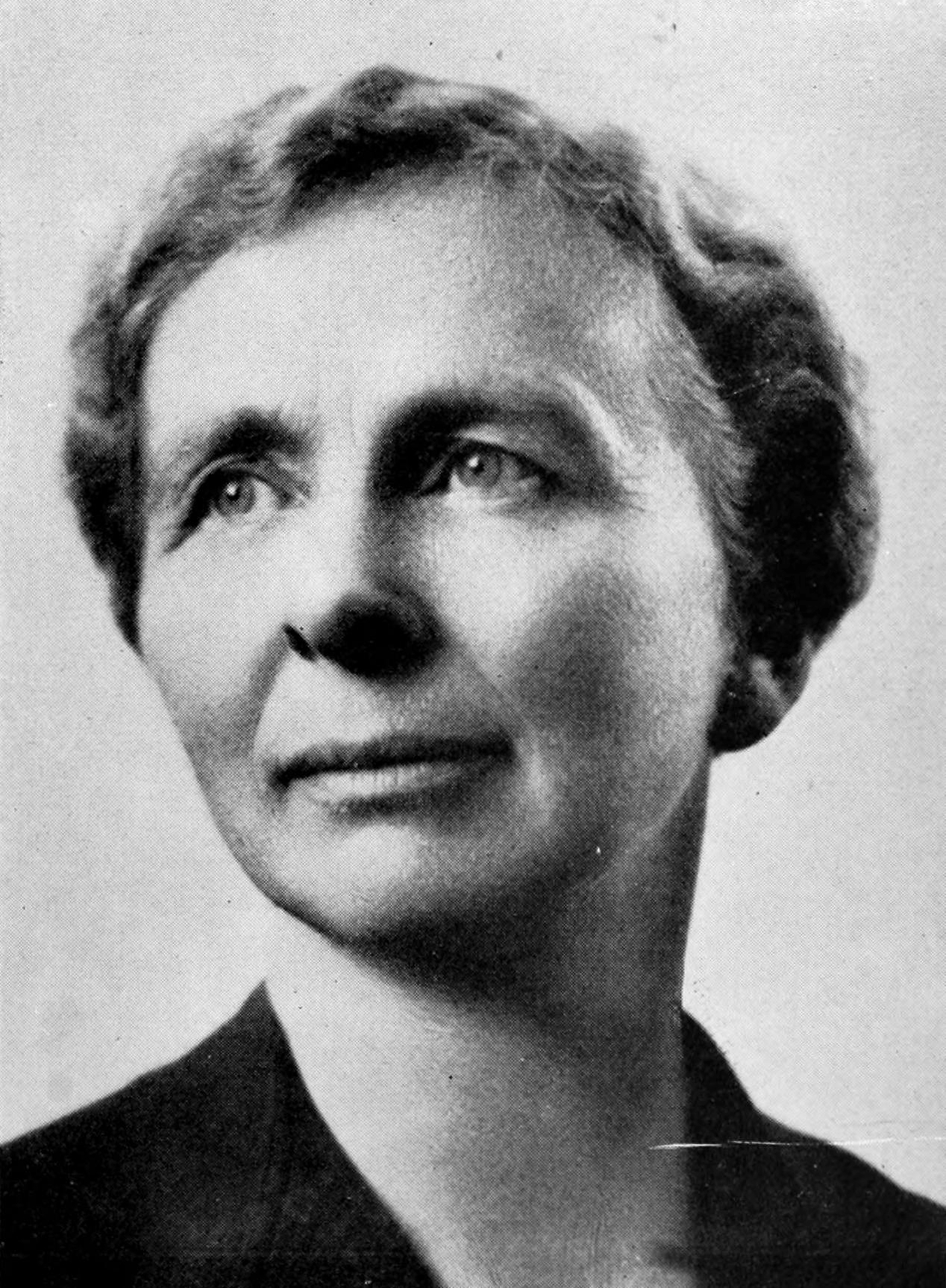
- Chickering c. 1940

Director of the California Department of Social Welfare
- In office August 1, 1939 – November 1, 1943
- Appointed by: Culbert Olson
- Preceded by: Florence L. Turner
- Succeeded by: Charles Wollenberg

Personal details
- Born: December 4, 1886 Oakland, California, U.S.
- Died: November 13, 1988 (aged 101) Pasadena, California, U.S.
- Party: Democratic
- Education: University of California, Berkeley

Martha Alexander Chickering (December 4, 1886 – November 13, 1988) was an American social work educator who served as director of the California State Department of Social Welfare from 1939 to 1943. She was inducted into the California Social Work Hall of Distinction for her work in establishing professional social work education in the state of California.

== Career ==
She was a member of the Chickering family of Massachusetts, later Oakland and Piedmont, California. She attended the NYC YWCA Training School from 1911 until 1913 after graduating from the University of California, Berkeley in 1910.

From 1918 to 1920, Chickering headed the Polish Grey Samaritans (founded by Laura de Turczynowicz), YWCA's efforts on post-war reconstruction in newly-formed Poland under the Herbert Hoover-founded American Relief Administration. In the 1920s, she was an executive of the local American Red Cross for five years.

When Berkeley's economics department started an accredited social work certificate program in 1928, Chickering was hired to supervise the field training of the students and became the program director in 1932.

In 1936, she received an PhD in economics at UC Berkeley and was appointed professor of Berkeley’s Curriculum in Social Services the same year. In 1939, she was appointed director of the California State Department of Social Welfare.

After retiring in 1945, Martha moved to the Mojave Desert outside Victorville, California and continued writing. She moved to Pasadena, California when she couldn’t live alone any longer. She died there in 1988 when she was 102.

== Legacy ==
In 1994, the UC Berkeley School of Social Welfare established the Martha Chickering Fellowship.

== Publications ==
- Into a Free Poland Via Germany published by Overseas Dept., National Board of the Young Women's Christian Associations, New York City, N.Y., 1920 OCLC 13768866
- Why California Registers its Social Workers; California Conference of Social Welfare, May 26, 1948, Long Beach. Provided by California Board of Behavioral Services.
- The Founding of a Mojave Desert Community. California Historical Society Quarterly 1 June 1948; 27 (2): 113–122. doi:10.2307/25156094
