= Raymond L. Haight =

American lawyer

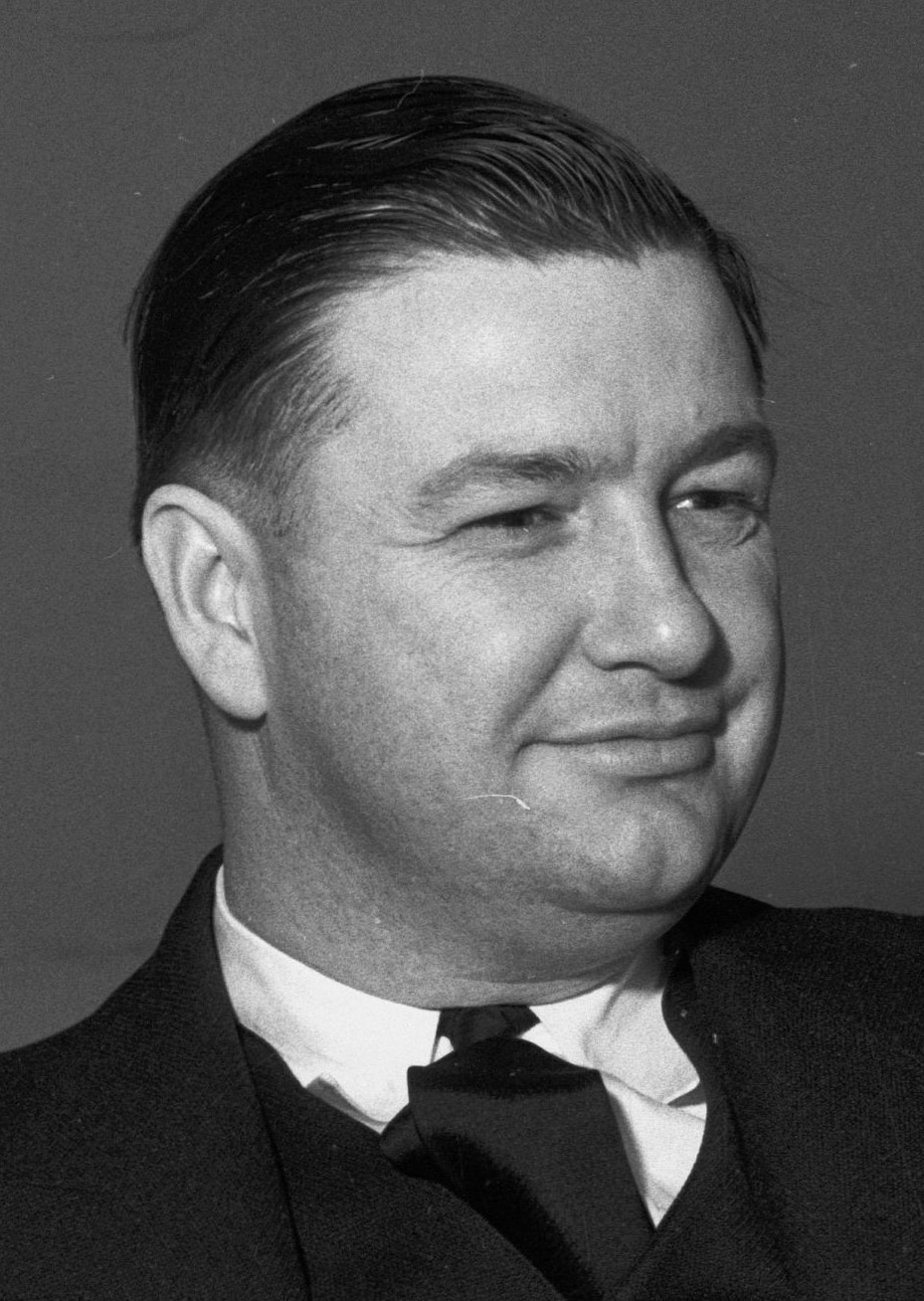
- Haight c. 1930s

California State Commissioner of Corporations
- In office January 6, 1931 – September 1, 1931
- Appointed by: James Rolph
- Preceded by: A. Garland
- Succeeded by: Edwin M. Daugherty

Personal details
- Born: July 18, 1897 San Jose, California, U.S.
- Died: September 2, 1947 (aged 50) San Diego, California, U.S.
- Party: Republican
- Other political affiliations: Progressive (1934, 1938)
- Relatives: Henry Huntly Haight (first cousin twice removed); Henry Haight (ancestor)
- Education: University of Southern California
- Occupation: Lawyer, politician

Raymond LeRoy Haight (July 18, 1897 – September 2, 1947) was an American lawyer and politician from California. Involved in the Republican and Commonwealth-Progressive parties, Haight ran as a third party candidate during the 1934 California gubernatorial election.

== Biography ==
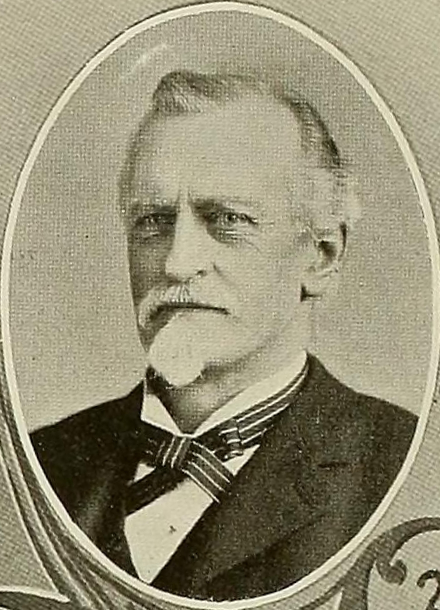
George W. Haight c. 1905

Haight was born in San Jose, California to George Haight and Isabella Hawkins. Haight's grandfather's first cousin was Henry Huntly Haight, the Governor of California from 1867 to 1871. Haight was also related to Henry Haight, a prominent pioneer and San Francisco banker during the California Gold Rush. Haight was educated in law at the University of Southern California, editing the Daily Trojan for a year between 1918 and 1919. Following graduation, Haight entered a Los Angeles-based law practice (Haight & Mathes, which would eventually become Sheppard, Mullin, Richter & Hampton), and quickly gained a reputation with corporate investigations. He served as City Attorney of Venice, Los Angeles and on the Los Angeles Playground and Recreation Commission in the 1920s.

In the 1934 California gubernatorial election, Haight initially campaigned for the Republican nomination, gaining 85,000 votes. Haight ultimately lost to Frank Merriam, who had recently been installed as governor following the death of James Rolph. Haight continued to pursue the governorship, gaining the nominations of the Progressive Party and the Commonwealth Party, running against the right-wing leaning Merriam, and against former Socialist Party of America member and still self-avowed socialist, author Upton Sinclair, the Democratic Party candidate. During the campaign, there was discussion amongst Democratic supporters, including A. P. Giannini, of asking Sinclair to leave the race in favor of Haight, due to belief that Haight's moderate politics and unassociation with socialism would stand better against Merriam's conservatism. Sinclair, however, remained unyielding.

Haight campaigned as a centrist between the rightist Merriam and the leftist Sinclair, seeking support from voters dissatisfied with both candidates. Haight garnered 302,519 votes, 13% of the vote. Much of Haight's voting strength came from the San Joaquin Valley, where farmers were suspicious of Sinclair's End Poverty in California scheme to take over so-called 'idle farms'. With 13% of the vote, Haight arguably spoiled Sinclair's chances for the governorship.

Haight would unsuccessfully run again as a Progressive in the 1938 election, though he would never garner the same support as he did in 1934. He returned to law, and rejoined Republican ranks. He served as a delegate to the 1944 Republican National Convention in Chicago.

Haight died in San Diego on September 2, 1947.

Party political offices
First Party obtained California ballot line in 1934	Progressive nominee for Governor of California; 1934, 1938	Party dissolved
