= California Progressive Party =

US political party

- Leader: Hiram Johnson
- Founded: 1912
- Dissolved: 1960s
- Preceded by: Republican Party; Populist Party
- Succeeded by: Citizens Party; Green Party
- Headquarters: Los Angeles, California
- Ideology: New Nationalism; Progressivism; Populism
- Political position: Center-left to left-wing
- National affiliation: "Bull Moose" Party (1912–20); Progressive Party (1924–27); Progressive Party (1948–55)

The California Progressive Party, also named California Bull Moose, was a political party that flourished from 1912 to 1944 and lasted through the 1960s.

== History ==
Members of the California for Roosevelt delegation to the 1912 Republican National Convention, including Hiram Johnson, George Pardee, Chester Harvey Rowell and C. C. Young.

In 1910, Hiram W. Johnson, a nominal Republican who was backed by suffragette and early feminist Katherine Philips Edson and other progressives opposed to monopoly capitalism epitomized by the Southern Pacific Railroad, was a successful candidate for California governor running with the support of the Lincoln–Roosevelt League. Johnson served as Theodore Roosevelt's running mate as the vice presidential nominee of the national Progressive "Bull Moose" Party in the 1912 Presidential election. The ticket came in second place and received 88 electoral votes, defeating incumbent President William Howard Taft but losing to Democratic candidate Woodrow Wilson.

Johnson was reelected as Governor of California on the Progressive ticket in 1914, a party he co-founded in 1912. In 1916, he was elected as a Progressive to the U.S. Senate and continued his affiliation with the state party throughout his decades in the Senate, while simultaneously winning the Republican nomination. While Johnson was personally close to Theodore Roosevelt, he was much closer ideologically to U.S. Senator Robert "Fighting Bob" La Follette of Wisconsin. Johnson sat out the general election in 1924 after unsuccessfully challenging incumbent Calvin Coolidge for the Republican presidential nomination, which was also contested by Fighting Bob La Follette. Johnson personally disliked La Follette but grudgingly admired his quixotic third-party bid and generally agreed with his 1924 platform.

In 1934, when the La Follettes founded the Wisconsin Progressive Party, the California Progressive Party obtained a ballot line in California and ran seven candidates (all unsuccessful, although Raymond L. Haight got 13% of the vote for Governor of California, running as a moderate against socialist and Democratic nominee Upton Sinclair of the EPIC movement). In 1936 they elected Franck R. Havenner as Congressman for California's 4th congressional district, and garnered a significant portion of the votes in some other races.

During 1938, the Progressive Commonwealth Federation (PCF) approved of the plans for National Progressives of America (NPA) set out by Philip La Follette, asking to be recognized as the California "division" of the NPA, leading to the California Progressive Party to send a pledge of cooperation with Philip La Follette.

Havenner became a Democrat before the 1938 race; Haight defeated eventual winner Culbert Olson in the Progressive primary election, but received only 2.43% of the vote in the general election as a Progressive; and by the time of the 1942 gubernatorial election, the Progressives were no longer on the California ballot. By 1944, Haight was again a Republican, a delegate to the Republican National Convention. The party nominated the national Progressive Party tickets for president of Henry Wallace and Vincent Hallinan in 1948 and 1952 respectively. The party lasted at the local level and continued to be active through the 1950s and 1960s; however, it slowly dissolved.

== Notable members ==
=== Governors of California ===
- Hiram Johnson (1911–1917)
- William Stephens (1917–1923)
- Friend Richardson (1923–1927)
- C. C. Young (1927–1931)
- Earl Warren (1943–1953)

=== Lieutenant governors of California ===
- John Morton Eshleman (1915–1916)
- William Stephens (1916–1917)
- C. C. Young (1919–1927)

=== California state treasurers ===
- Friend Richardson (1915–1923)

=== United States senators ===
- Hiram Johnson (1917–1945)
- Sheridan Downey (1939–1950)

=== United States representatives ===
- William Stephens (1911–1916)
- William Kent (1911–1917)
- Charles W. Bell (1913–1915)
- John I. Nolan (1913–1922)
- John A. Elston (1915–1921)
- Henry S. Benedict (1916–1917)
- Lawrence J. Flaherty (1925–1926)
- Franck R. Havenner (1937–1941, 1945–1953)
- Edouard Izac (1937–1947)

=== State officials ===
- Raymond L. Haight, California State Commissioner of Corporations (1931), candidate for Governor of California, 1934, 1938
- L. B. Mallory, Chief Clerk of the California State Assembly (1911–1917)
- Edward J. Tyrrell, California State Senator (1911–1919)
- Dominic Joseph Beban, California State Senator (1915–1916)
- William S. Scott, California State Senator (1915–1923)
- J. J. Crowley, California State Senator (1915–1931)
- W. F. Chandler, California State Senator (1915–1919)
- Prescott F. Cogswell, California State Senator (1913–1917), California State Assemblyman (1907–1913)
- Lee C. Gates, California State Senator (1911–1915)
- William J. Carr, California State Senator (1913–1923)
- Edgar A. Luce, California State Senator (1915–1919)
- Frank R. Devlin, California State Assemblyman (1905–1909)
- William P. Kennedy, California State Assemblyman (1915–1917)
- William M. Collins, California State Assemblyman (1913–1920)
- Joseph Edmund Marron, California State Assemblyman (1915–1917)

=== Local officials ===
- A. J. Barnes, Member of the Los Angeles City Council (1925–1927)
- Otto J. Zahn, Member of the Los Angeles City Council (1925–1927)
- James Stuart McKnight, Member of the Los Angeles City Council (1931–1933)
- Parley P. Christensen, Member of the Los Angeles City Council (1935–1937, 1939–1949)

=== Other members ===
- Vincent Hallinan, candidate for President of the United States, 1952
- Francis J. Heney, candidate for U.S. Senator, 1914
- Alice Lee, civic leader
- George Marston, philanthropist
- Chester Harvey Rowell, progressive leader
- Rudolph Spreckels, businessman
