= Culbert Olson =

American politician (1876–1962)

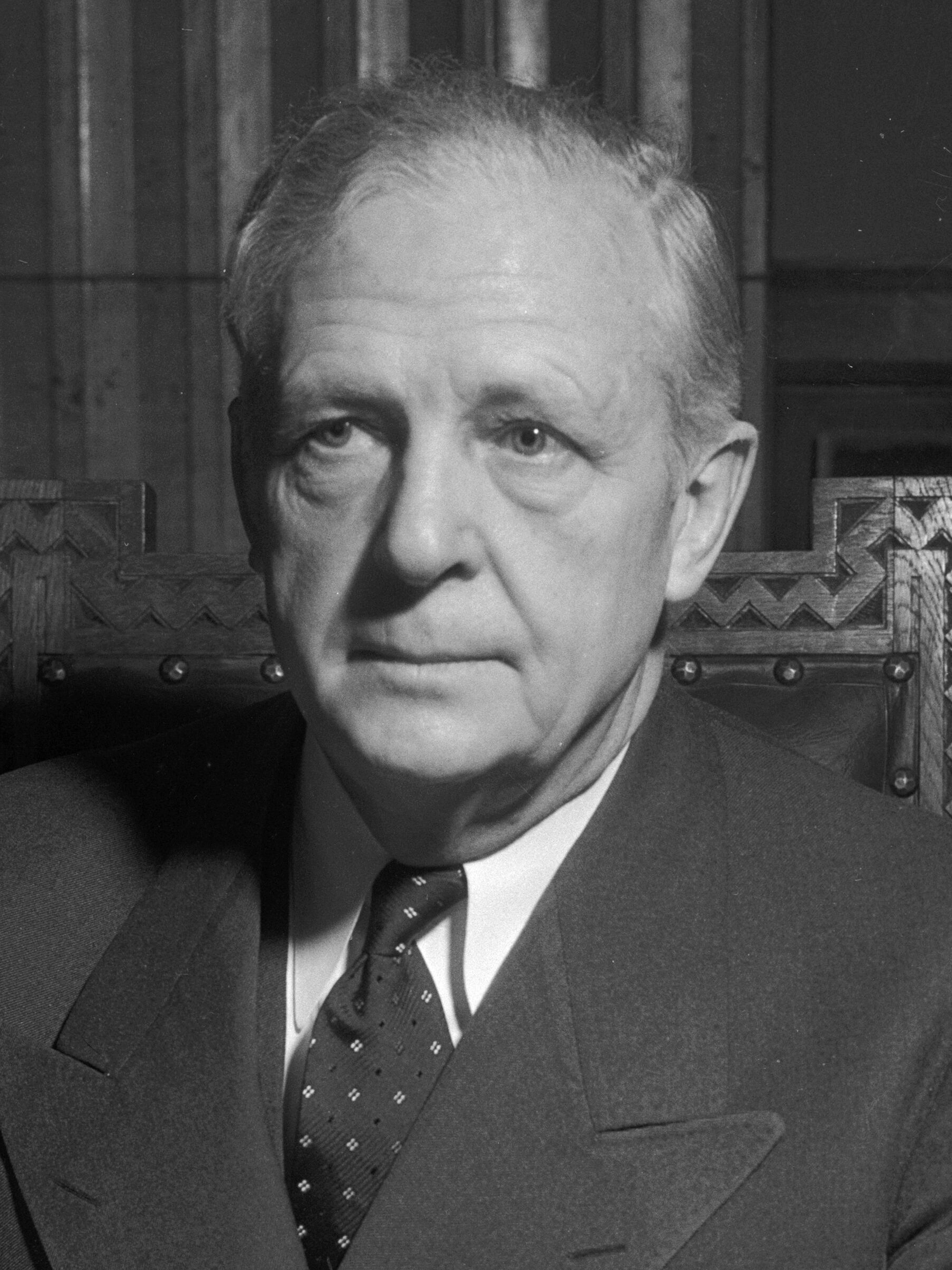
- Olson in 1935

29th Governor of California
- In office January 2, 1939 – January 4, 1943
- Lieutenant: Ellis E. Patterson
- Preceded by: Frank Merriam
- Succeeded by: Earl Warren

Member of the California Senate from the 38th district
- In office January 7, 1935 – January 2, 1939
- Preceded by: J. W. McKinley
- Succeeded by: Robert W. Kenny

Chairman of the California Democratic Party
- In office September 29, 1934 – September 26, 1937
- Preceded by: Maurice Harrison
- Succeeded by: Clifford C. Anglim

Member of the Utah State Senate from the 6th district
- In office January 8, 1917 – January 10, 1921
- Preceded by: Multi-member district
- Succeeded by: Multi-member district

Personal details
- Born: Culbert Levy Olson; November 7, 1876 Fillmore, Utah, U.S.
- Died: April 13, 1962 (aged 85) Los Angeles, California, U.S.
- Party: Democratic
- Spouse: Kate Jeremy (m. 1905; died 1939)
- Children: 3
- Relatives: Edmund Rice (ancestor); William H. King (first cousin)
- Education: Brigham Young University; University of Michigan; George Washington University
- Profession: Journalist, lawyer
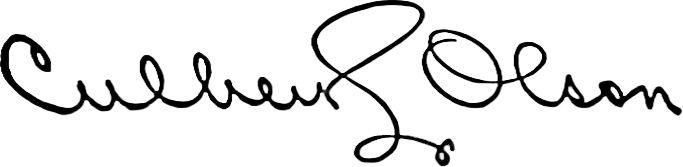
- Signature
- Culbert Olson's voice This broadcast contains a campaign speech on old age assistance and pension benefits. Recorded 1942

Culbert Levy Olson (November 7, 1876 – April 13, 1962) was an American lawyer and politician who served as the 29th governor of California from 1939 to 1943. A member of the Democratic Party, Olson was previously elected to both the Utah State Senate and California State Senate, serving one term in each. During his term as governor, Olson struggled to pass New Deal legislation due to hostility from the California legislature. He also supported the internment and removal of Japanese Americans from California after the United States entered World War II. He was the first atheist governor of an American state.

== Early life and education ==
Olson was born in Fillmore, Utah, the son of Delilah Cornelia (née King) and George Daniel Olson, on November 7, 1876. Olson's mother was a suffragette and became the first female elected official in Utah. His first cousin was U.S. Senator William H. King, and both were descendants of Edmund Rice, an early immigrant to Massachusetts Bay Colony.

Olson's mother and father belonged to the Church of Jesus Christ of Latter-day Saints. However, Culbert was unconvinced of the existence of God, and became an atheist at the age of 10.

Leaving school at the age of 14, Olson worked briefly as a telegraph operator. In 1890, he enrolled at Brigham Young University in Provo, where he studied law and journalism.

== Career ==
Upon graduating at the age of 19 in 1895, Olson embarked on a career as a journalist with the Daily Ogden Standard. During the 1896 presidential election, Olson campaigned for Democratic candidate William Jennings Bryan. After the election, Olson moved briefly to Michigan, studying law at the University of Michigan, and then later to Washington, D.C., where he worked as a newspaper correspondent and secretary for the U.S. Congress. During his time in the capital, Olson attended law school at George Washington University, and he was admitted to the Utah Bar in 1901.

=== Utah and California Legislatures ===
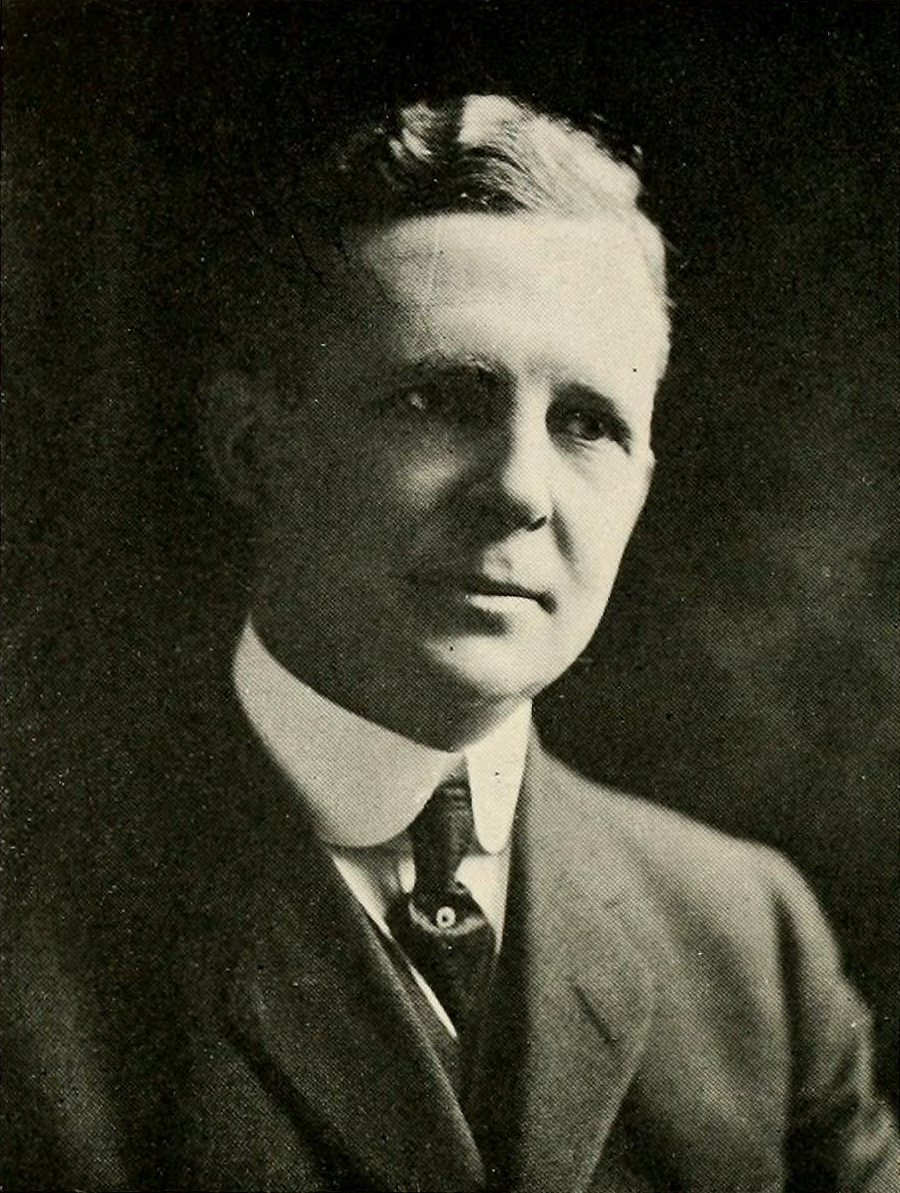
Olson c. 1914

Olson moved back to Utah in 1901, settling in Salt Lake City to join a law practice. Building a reputation of defending trade unionists and political progressives, Olson was elected to the Utah State Senate in 1916. During his four years in the State Senate, Olson wrote and endorsed legislation to end child labor in the state, guarantee old age pensions, and expand government control of public utilities.

Olson declined to run again for the State Senate in the 1920 general election. Instead, Olson relocated to Los Angeles, California, beginning another law practice, where he again gained a reputation of investigating corporate fraud. Politics never remained far. Olson campaigned openly for Progressive Party candidate Robert La Follette in 1924, and for Democrat Franklin Roosevelt in 1932.

In 1934, in the middle of the Great Depression, Olson ran as a Democrat for the California State Senate, representing Los Angeles. During the 1934 state general elections, Olson campaigned for former Socialist Party member and Democratic nominee for governor, Upton Sinclair, participating in Sinclair's End Poverty in California campaign. While Sinclair lost the gubernatorial election to Republican Frank Merriam, Olson was elected to the California State Senate that year.

While in the state senate, the second state legislative seat to which he was elected, Olson openly supported Roosevelt's New Deal policies towards the unemployed. Seeing large business interests as a barrier to change, Olson wrote the Olson Oil Bill to cut down oil company monopolies in the state.

=== 1938 gubernatorial election ===
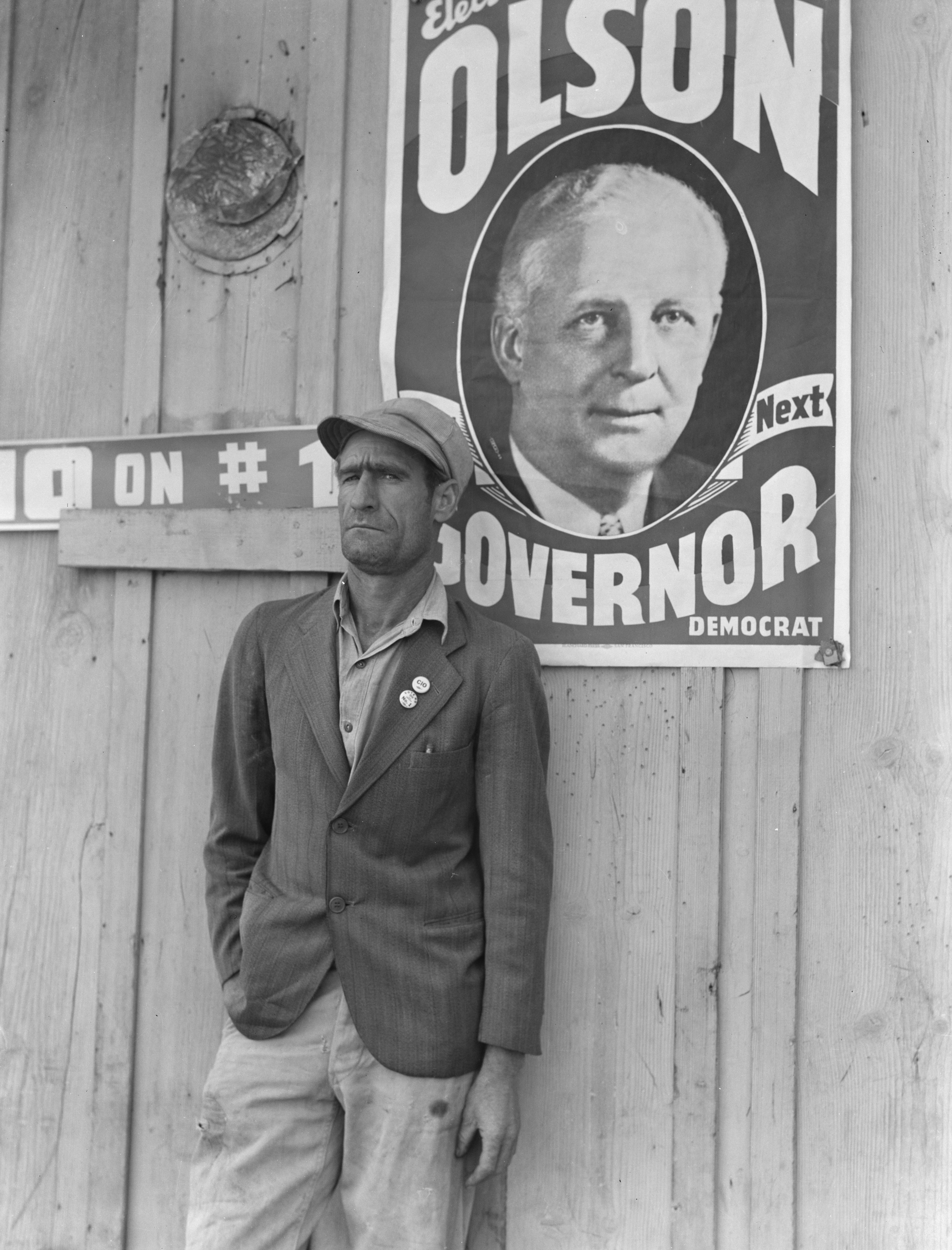
"Migratory field worker, leader of the cotton strike of October 1938, which took place just before the election. Kern County, California." (Photo: Dorothea Lange)

With the open support of President Roosevelt, Olson ran for governor of California in the 1938 election against conservative Republican and anti-labor incumbent Governor Frank Merriam. Merriam, known for suppressing the 1934 Longshore Strike and his conservative fiscal policies, was a highly unpopular candidate among progressives and unionists, with even conservative Republicans angered by his 1935 tax reforms. Merriam lost soundly to Olson. He was the first Democrat to win the governorship since James Budd's election in 1894, breaking the 40-year Democrat isolation from the governorship.

=== Governor of California, 1939–1943 ===
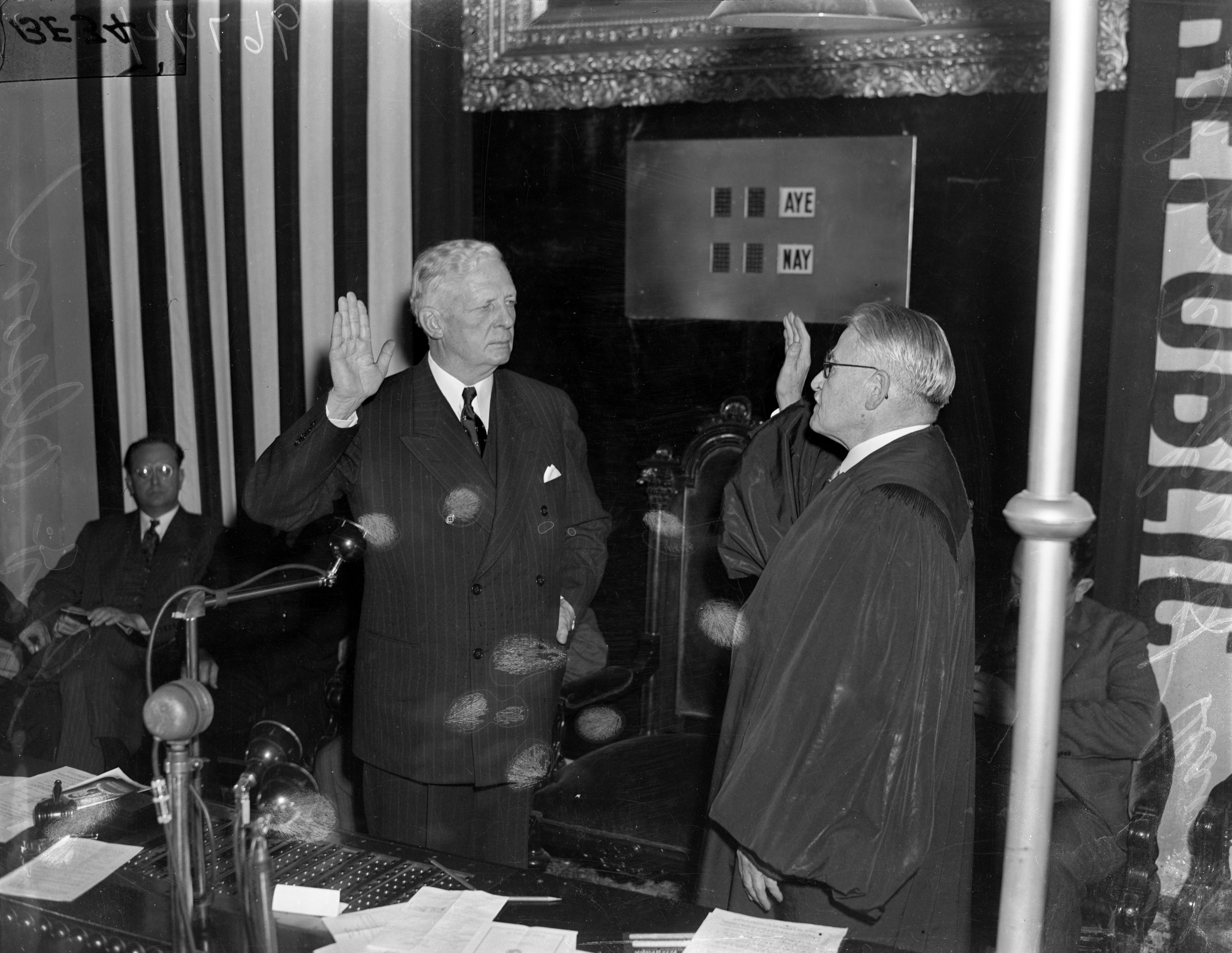
Olson takes the oath of office with his hand in his pocket, January 2, 1939

Olson was inaugurated as California's twenty-ninth executive on January 2, 1939, the first Democrat to serve as governor of California in 40 years. He refused to say "so help me God" during his oath of office to state Supreme Court chief justice William H. Waste. Olson remarked earlier to justice Waste that "God couldn't help me at all, and that there isn't any such person." Instead, Olson said, "I will affirm."

In his inaugural address, Olson pointed at progressives and the Left for his inspiration, citing that "[t]hey point the way forward - toward the achievement of the aspiration of the people for an economy that will afford general employment, abundant production, equitable distribution, social security and old age retirement, which our country, with its ample resources, great facilities and the genius of its people, is capable of providing."

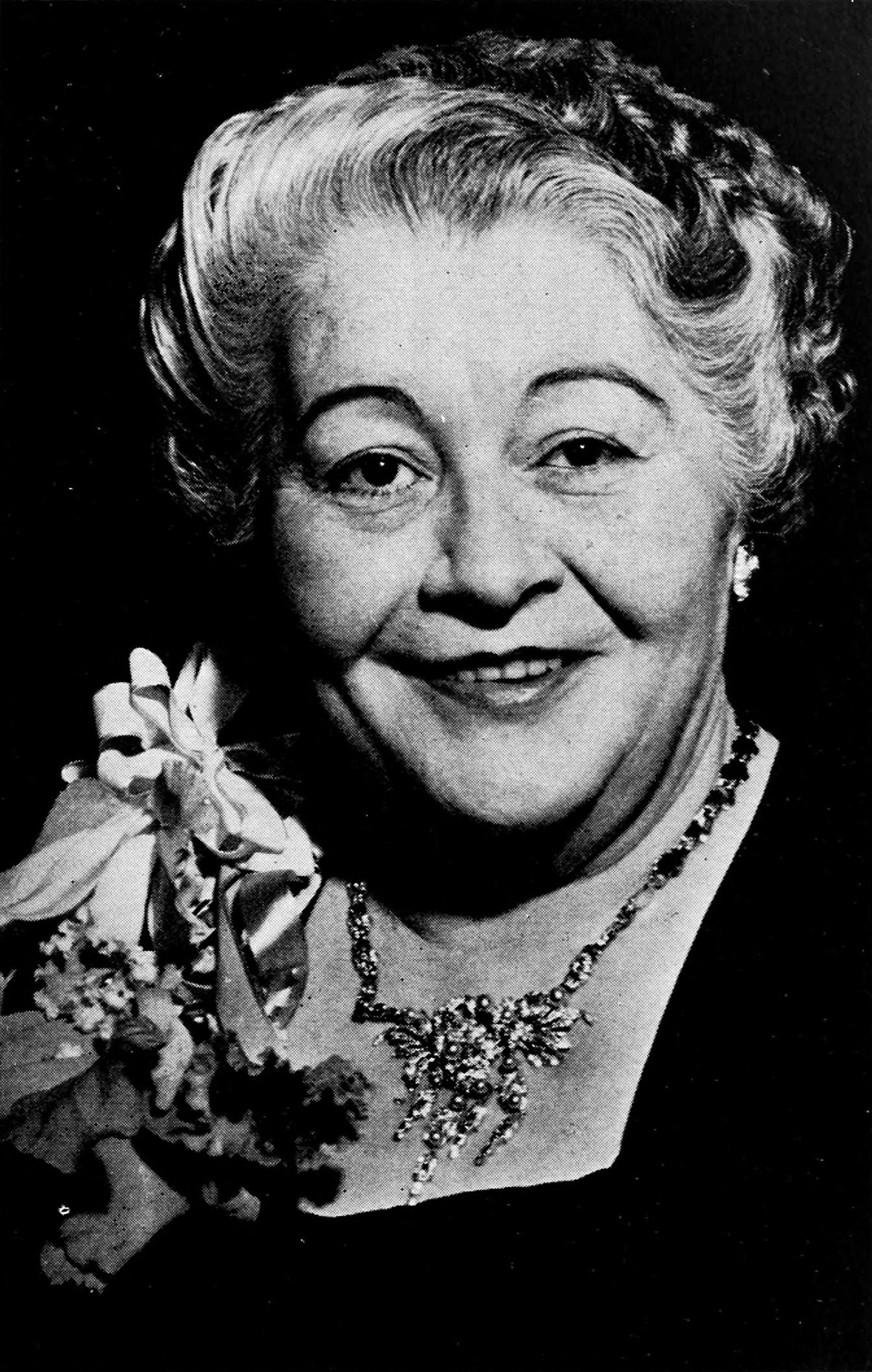
Olson's wife, Kate, who died just three months into his term

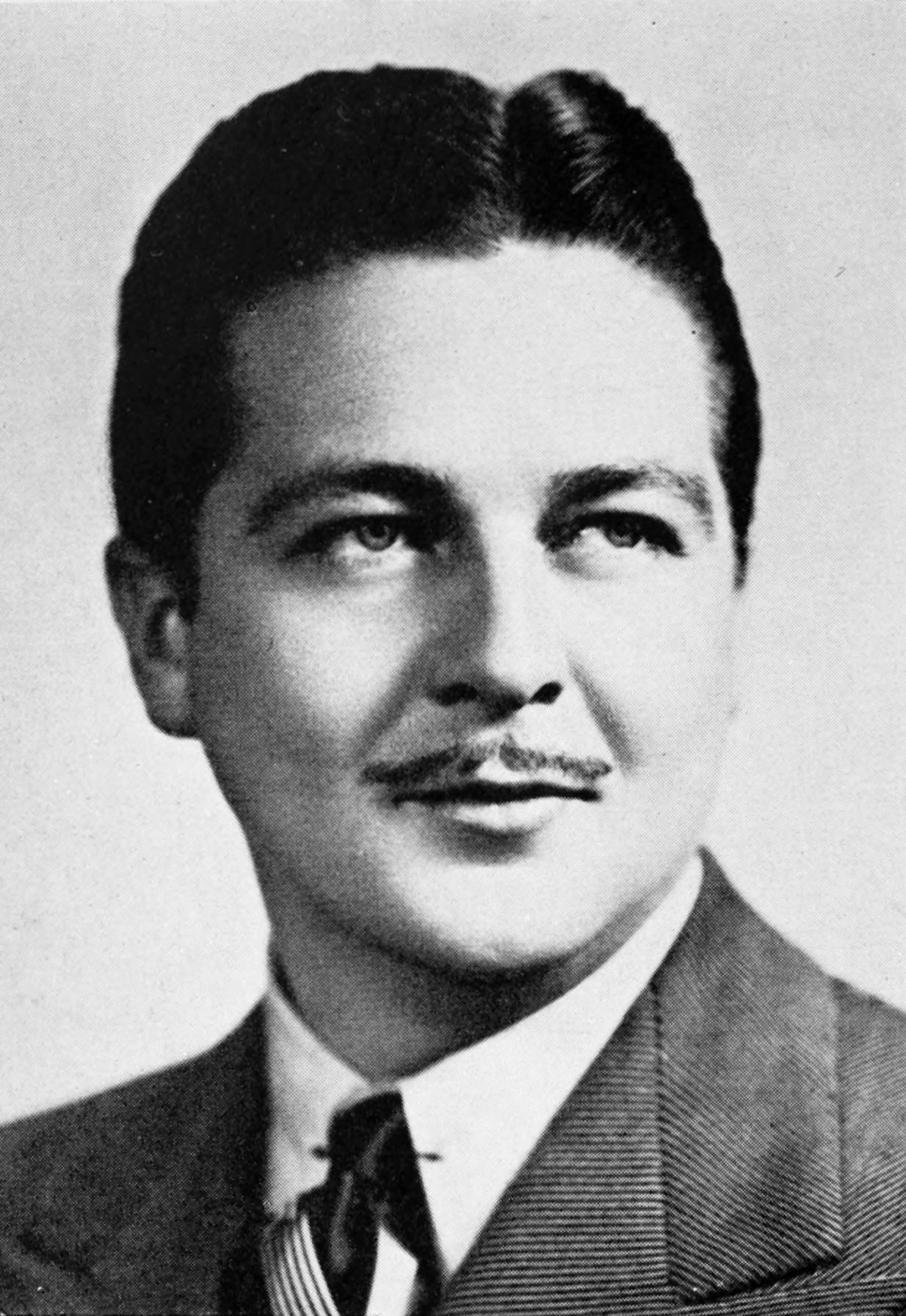
Olson's son Richard, who served as his secretary early in his term

Olson's tenure in the governorship got off to a rocky start. He collapsed four days after his inauguration, and doctors discovered that he was suffering from an ailing heart. On top of personal health matters, Kate Jeremy Olson, the Governor's wife of nearly thirty-four years, died shortly after he assumed the office.

Among those Olson appointed to his cabinet were businessman George Killion as director of Finance, labor leader George G. Kidwell as director of Industrial Relations, and social worker Martha Chickering as director of Social Welfare. During his tenure, he appointed four associate justices to the state Supreme Court: Jesse W. Carter, Phil S. Gibson, Roger J. Traynor, and B. Rey Schauer. After the death of chief justice Waste in 1940, Olson elevated Gibson to the position.

Contrasting with the conservative policies of Governor Frank Merriam, Olson promoted friendly relations with the state's labor unions. In September 1939, he officially pardoned Tom Mooney, a labor activist and political prisoner accused of plotting the 1916 Preparedness Day Bombing in San Francisco. Olson cited scant evidence against Mooney as the reason for his pardon. The next month, Olson pardoned Mooney's alleged accomplice, Warren Billings.

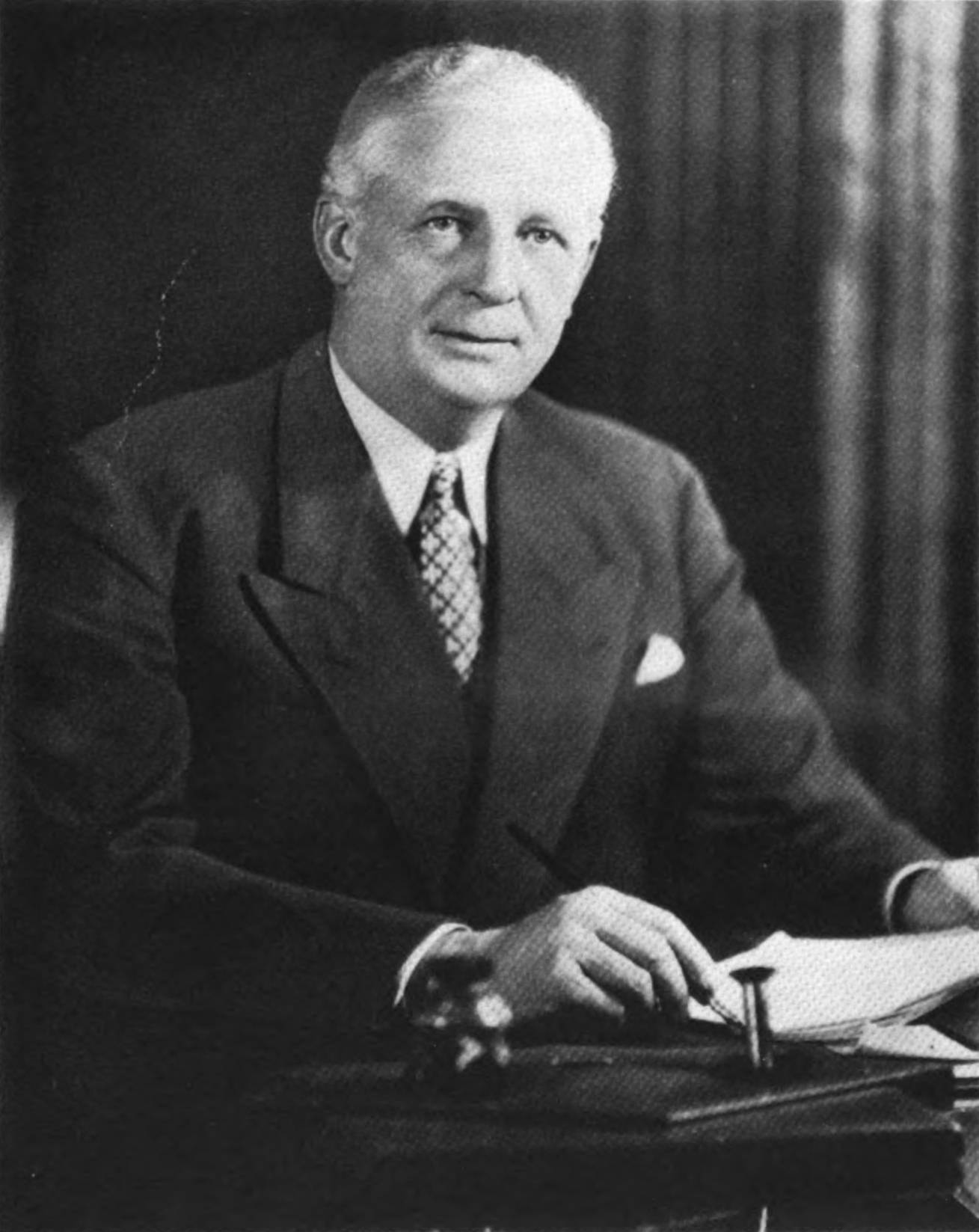
Campaign portrait, 1938

Although a number of progressive reforms were carried out during Olson's time as governor, his relationship with the California State Legislature was often bitter. With a conservative coalition of Republicans and 10 “economy bloc” Democrats controlling the Assembly, and business-friendly Republicans in the Senate, Olson had little room to promote his New Deal politics, while the Legislature remained wary of Olson's leftist agenda. In the first year of his governorship, Olson's proposed budget was cut by nearly 100 million dollars, while the Legislature also defeated legislation to raise income, bank and corporate taxes, as well as Olson's bills to regulate lobbyists and reform the state penal system. State-subsidized relief for farmers was cut nearly in half. In addition, Olson's proposal of compulsory universal health insurance for every Californian was defeated by the Assembly, with 48 votes against and only 20 votes in favor of the proposal.

Olson installed a telephone hotline to the legislature to get immediate word of lawmakers' positions on bills in committee or on the floor for a vote.

During his tenure, Olson grew increasingly critical of the Roman Catholic Church and its presence in the state educational system, and raised the ire of Archbishops John J. Cantwell of Los Angeles and John J. Mitty of San Francisco. A secular atheist, Olson was disturbed by the state legislature's passage of two bills in 1941: one to give free transportation to students attending Catholic schools, and the other to release Catholic children from public schools in the middle of the school day in order to attend catechism, leaving the schools and other students idle until the Catholic students returned. Olson signed the first bill into law, later citing the enormous pressure of the Catholic Church on his office and on state lawmakers, but he vetoed the second ("early release") bill.

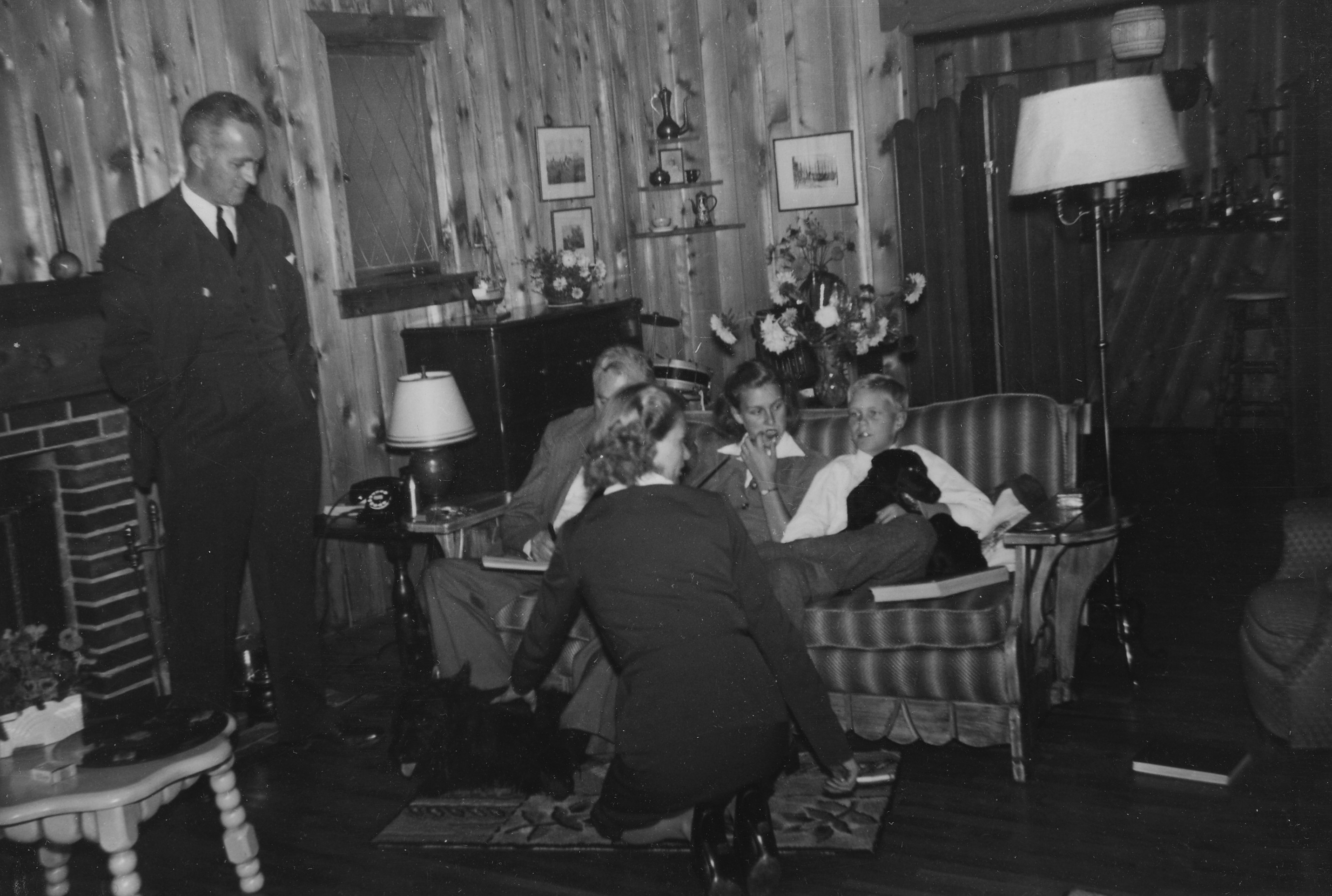
President Roosevelt visits Long Beach, September 1942

After the Japanese attack on Pearl Harbor in December 1941, and the entry of the United States into the Second World War, many in California feared a Japanese invasion. In the wake of the attack, Olson urged calm from Californians. In a plea for racial tolerance, broadcast on December 14, he stated he had assurances from "every racial group" of their loyalty and devotion to the United States, even reading a telegram he had received from a Japanese citizen. Olson attempted to revoke the business licenses of "enemy alien" Japanese in California. (Japanese immigrants were prohibited by law from becoming U.S. citizens and were therefore permanent aliens, although many had resided in California for decades.) On February 19, 1942, President Franklin Roosevelt issued Executive Order 9066, allowing U.S. military commanders to create zones from which "any or all persons may be excluded." Based on that, all West Coast Japanese Americans, including American-born Nisei and Sansei, in addition to the non-citizen Issei, were forcibly relocated to isolated internment camps over the next several months.

The pro-internment recommendations of General John L. DeWitt (head of the Western Defense Command) were embarrassing for Governor Olson. On February 2, 1942, the Governor, following a meeting with DeWitt, said that mass evacuation would not be necessary; DeWitt pursued his plans regardless of Olson's disagreement. However, despite his preference for excluding Japanese Americans only from "coastal California", and allowing adult men to work in labor camps as an alternative to incarceration, Olson wholeheartedly supported the eviction. A long-time supporter of nearly every Roosevelt position on economics, politics and foreign policy, on March 6, 1942, he testified before a U.S. House committee on the danger of allowing Japanese Americans to remain free: "Because of the extreme difficulty in distinguishing between loyal Japanese Americans, and there are many who are loyal to this country, and those other Japanese whose loyalty is to the Mikado, I believe in the wholesale evacuation of the Japanese people from coastal California."

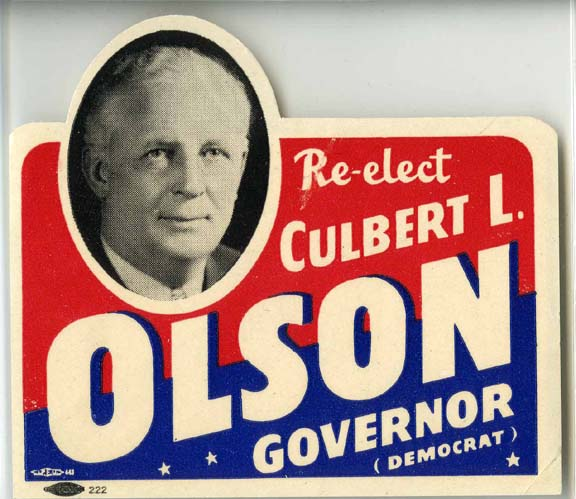
Advertisement for Olson's re-election, 1942

By the 1942 election, Republicans were accusing Olson of blatant partisan politics during wartime, citing Olson's often bitter divides with the State Legislature. The Republicans nominated California Attorney General Earl Warren as the party's nominee for the governorship. Warren, a centrist Republican, campaigned as a moderate who would appeal to both liberals and conservatives during a time of war, where California was considered as a possible front line, while accusing Olson of being an uncompromising left-wing Democrat.

Olson lost re-election to Warren in an electoral landslide, receiving just 42% of the vote to Warren's 57%. In later years, Olson blamed "the active hostility of a certain privately owned power corporation and the Roman Catholic Church in California" for his defeat.

=== Later career ===
Following his departure from the governorship, Olson returned to law. He regained the public spotlight again in the 1950s, when the Legislature voted to exempt Catholic schools from real estate taxes. Olson filed an amicus curiae brief to the state Supreme Court, asking the court to explain how the state's exemption of a religious organization from civil taxes was constitutional.

In 1957, Olson became president of the United Secularists of America, a body of secularists, atheists, and freethinkers.

He was one of the signatories of the agreement to call a convention for drafting a world constitution. As a result, for the first time in human history, a World Constituent Assembly convened to draft and adopt the Constitution for the Federation of Earth.

== Death and legacy ==
Olson died in Los Angeles on April 13, 1962, aged 85. He is buried in Forest Lawn Memorial Park Cemetery, Glendale, California.

Olson's son John was appointed a judge of the Los Angeles Municipal Court by governor Pat Brown in 1962, serving until his death in 1971.

== See also ==
- Earl King, Ernest Ramsay, and Frank Conner murder case
- Culbert Olson administration personnel
- Culbert Olson political appointees
- List of atheists in politics and law

Political offices
Preceded by Frank Merriam	Governor of California; 1939–1943	Succeeded by Earl Warren
Party political offices
Preceded by Upton Sinclair	Democratic nominee for Governor of California; 1938, 1942	Succeeded by Earl Warren
