= Progressive Party (United States, 1924–1927) =

- Chair: Robert M. La Follette
- Founded: 1924; 102 years ago
- Dissolved: 1927; 99 years ago
- Split from: Democratic Party; Republican Party
- Preceded by: Progressive Party (1912–1920)
- Succeeded by: Wisconsin Progressive Party; California Progressive Party; National Progressives of America
- Headquarters: Washington, D.C.
- Ideology: La Folletteism; Agrarianism; Left-wing populism Progressivism; Wisconsin Idea
- Political position: Left-wing

The Progressive Party was a political party created as a vehicle for Robert M. La Follette to run for president in the 1924 election. It did not run candidates for other offices, and it disappeared after the election. The party advocated progressive positions such as government ownership of railroads and electric utilities, cheap credit for farmers, the outlawing of child labor, stronger laws to help labor unions, more protection of civil liberties, an end to American imperialism in Latin America, and a referendum before any president could lead the nation into war.

After winning election to the United States Senate in 1905, La Follette had emerged as a leader of progressives. He sought the Republican presidential nomination in the 1912 election, but many of his backers switched to Theodore Roosevelt after the former president entered the race. La Follette refused to join Roosevelt's Progressive Party, and that party collapsed after 1916. However, the progressives remained a potent force within both major parties. In 1924, La Follette and his followers created their own Progressive Party which challenged the conservative major party nominees, Calvin Coolidge of the Republican Party and John W. Davis of the Democratic Party.

The Progressive Party was composed of La Follette supporters, who were distinguished from the earlier Roosevelt supporters by being generally more agrarian, populist, and midwestern in perspective, as opposed to urban, elite, and eastern. The party held a national convention in July 1924 that nominated a ticket consisting of La Follette for president; La Follete later selected Democratic Senator Burton K. Wheeler of Montana as his running mate. The ticket enjoyed support among many farmers and laborers and was endorsed by the Socialist Party of America, the Farmer–Labor Party and the American Federation of Labor.

In the 1924 election, the party carried only La Follette's home state of Wisconsin. The ticket won 16.6% of the national popular vote and carried many counties in the Midwest and West with large German American elements or strong labor union movements. Kenneth McKay estimates that about 52 percent of the LaFollette's support (2,530,000 votes) came from farmers; 20 percent (1,000,000) from socialists; another 20 percent from union members of the American Federation of Labor; and about 8 percent from railroad workers.

The party's share of the vote represents one of the best performances by a third party in presidential election history.

The Progressive Party's National Committee held its last meeting in 1927. In 1934, nine years after his death, Follette's sons created the Wisconsin Progressive Party and briefly dominated Wisconsin politics.

== Wisconsin Progressives ==
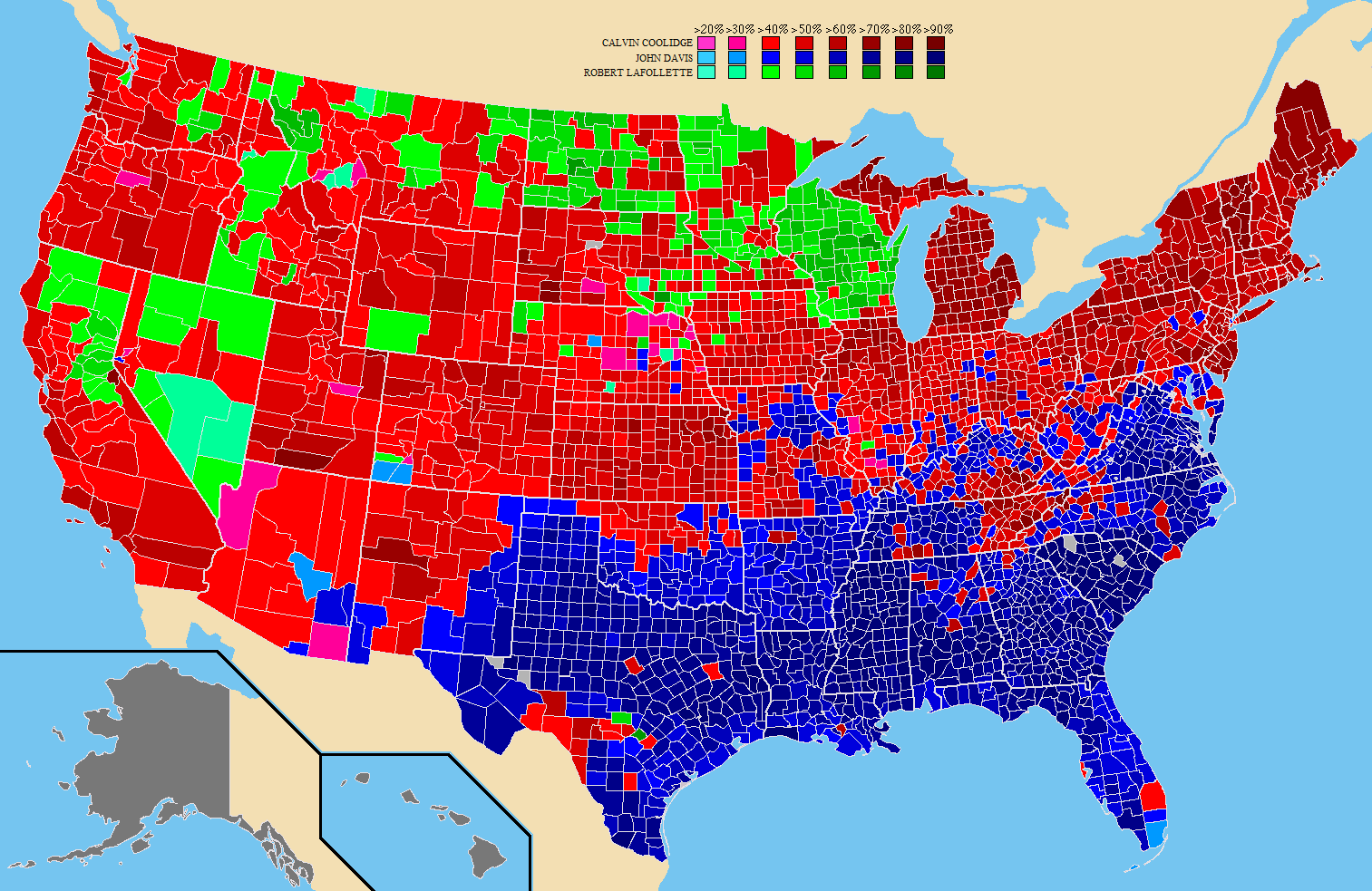
1924 Presidential election results by county. Calvin Coolidge John W. Davis Robert M. La Follette — light = plurality, green = over 50%

Years before, La Follette had created the "Progressive" faction inside the Republican Party of Wisconsin in 1900. In 1912 he attempted to create a Progressive Party but lost control to Theodore Roosevelt, who became his bitter enemy.

In 1924 his new party (using the old 1912 name) called for public ownership of railroads, which catered to the Railroad brotherhoods. La Follette ran with Senator Burton K. Wheeler, Democratic Senator from Montana. The party represented a farmer/labor coalition and was endorsed by the Socialist Party of America, the Farmer–Labor Party and the American Federation of Labor and many railroad brotherhoods. The party did not run candidates for other offices, and only carried one state, Wisconsin. La Follette continued to serve in the Senate as a Republican until his death the following year, and was succeeded in a special election in 1925 by his son, Robert M. La Follette Jr.

The La Follette family continued his political legacy in Wisconsin, publishing The Progressive magazine and pushing for liberal reforms. In 1934, La Follette's two sons began the Wisconsin Progressive Party, which briefly held power in the state and was for some time one of the state's major parties, often ahead of the Democrats.

== California Progressives ==
Hiram W. Johnson, backed by women's suffrage activist and early feminist Katherine Philips Edson, was a candidate for California governor in 1910, the Progressive Party vice presidential nominee in 1912, and was reelected as Governor of California on the Progressive ticket in 1914. In 1916, he was elected as a Progressive to the U.S. Senate and continued his affiliation with the state party throughout his decades in the Senate, while simultaneously winning the Republican nomination. While Johnson was personally close to Theodore Roosevelt, he was much closer ideologically to Robert La Follette. Johnson sat out the general election in 1924 after unsuccessfully challenging President Calvin Coolidge for the Republican nomination. Johnson personally disliked La Follette but grudgingly admired his quixotic third-party bid and generally agreed with his 1924 platform.

In 1934, when the La Follettes founded the Wisconsin Progressive Party, the California Progressive Party obtained a ballot line in California and ran seven candidates (all unsuccessful, although Raymond L. Haight got 13% of the vote for Governor of California, running as a moderate against socialist and Democratic nominee Upton Sinclair). In 1936 they elected Franck R. Havenner as Congressman for California's 4th congressional district and garnered a significant portion of the votes in some other races.

Havenner became a Democrat before the 1938 race; Haight defeated eventual winner Culbert Olson in the Progressive primary election but received only 2.43% of the vote in the general election as a Progressive; and by the time of the 1942 gubernatorial election, the Progressives were no longer on the California ballot. By 1944, Haight was again a Republican, a delegate to the Republican National Convention.

== Presidential candidate performance ==
Progressive Party performance by state.

Year	Presidential nominee	Vice-Presidential nominee	Popular votes	Percentage	Electoral votes
1924	Robert M. La Follette	Burton K. Wheeler	4,831,706 #3	16.6%	13

== See also ==
- Progressive Party (1912–1920)
- Progressive Party (1948–1955)
- National Progressives of America
- Wisconsin Progressive Party
- California Progressive Party
- Nomination of Robert M. La Follette for President, 1924
- A.J. Barnes, California Progressive candidate
