= 1984 United States presidential election in California =

- November 6, 1984
- Turnout: 74.93% (of registered voters) ▼2.31 pp 59.08% (of eligible voters) ▲2.04 pp

Nominee	Ronald Reagan	Walter Mondale
Party	Republican	Democratic
Home state	California	Minnesota
Running mate	George H. W. Bush	Geraldine Ferraro
Electoral vote	47	0
Popular vote	5,467,009	3,922,519
Percentage	57.51%	41.27%

Reagan
50–60%
60–70%
70–80%
Mondale
40–50%
50–60%
60–70%
70–80%
President before election
Ronald Reagan
Republican
Elected President
Ronald Reagan
Republican

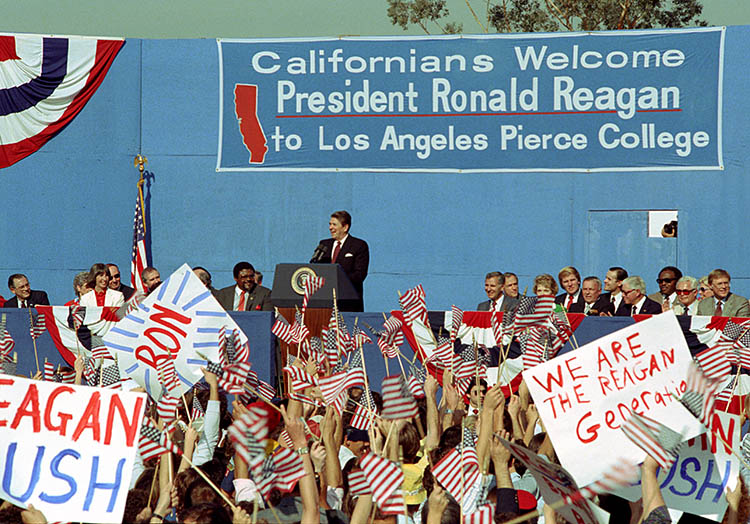
Reagan holding a campaign rally at Los Angeles Pierce College on the eve of the election

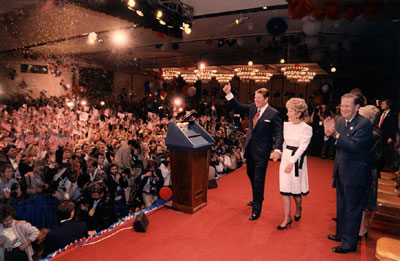
Reagan and his wife Nancy celebrate at the Century Plaza Hotel in Los Angeles after the announcement of his 1984 electoral victory

The 1984 United States presidential election in California took place on November 6, 1984, as part of the 1984 United States presidential election. State voters chose 47 representatives, or electors, to the Electoral College, who voted for president and vice president. California voted for the Republican incumbent and former California Governor, Ronald Reagan, in a landslide over the Democratic challenger, former Minnesota Senator and Vice President Walter Mondale. Reagan easily won his home state with a comfortable 16.24% margin and carried all but five counties. Despite this, California's margin was 1.97% more Democratic than the nation as a whole.

As of the 2024 presidential election, this is the last time a Republican carried the following California counties in a presidential election: Contra Costa, Humboldt, Los Angeles, Mendocino, San Mateo, Santa Clara, Solano and Sonoma. Mondale flipped Marin and Santa Cruz Counties.

== Democratic primary ==
Jesse Jackson's voters were 50% black, 38% white, 7% Hispanic, and 5% were members of other groups. Massachusetts was the only state where black voters composed a smaller percentage of his supporters.

== Results ==
1984 United States presidential election in California
Party	Candidate	Votes	Percentage	Electoral votes
Republican	Ronald Wilson Reagan (Incumbent)	5,467,009	57.51%	47
Democratic	Walter Frederick Mondale	3,922,519	41.27%	0
Libertarian	David Bergland	49,951	0.53%	0
American Independent	Bob Richards	39,265	0.41%	0
Peace and Freedom	Sonia Johnson	26,297	0.28%	0
No party	Write-in	366	0.00%	0
No party	Dennis L. Serrette (write-in)	16	0.00%	0
Invalid or blank votes				—
Totals		9,505,423	100.00%	47
Voter turnout				—

=== Results by county ===
County	Ronald Reagan Republican		Walter Mondale Democratic		Various candidates Other parties		Margin		Total votes cast
County	#	%	#	%	#	%	#	%	Total votes cast
Alameda	192,408	40.01%	282,041	58.65%	6,425	1.34%	-89,633	-18.64%	480,874
Alpine	264	56.65%	194	41.63%	8	1.72%	70	15.02%	466
Amador	6,986	61.48%	4,188	36.86%	189	1.66%	2,798	24.62%	11,363
Butte	45,381	63.06%	25,421	35.32%	1,162	1.62%	19,960	27.74%	71,964
Calaveras	7,632	64.26%	4,081	34.36%	164	1.38%	3,551	29.90%	11,877
Colusa	3,388	65.30%	1,725	33.25%	75	1.45%	1,663	32.05%	5,188
Contra Costa	172,331	54.48%	140,994	44.57%	2,993	0.95%	31,337	9.91%	316,318
Del Norte	3,996	58.41%	2,696	39.41%	149	2.18%	1,300	19.00%	6,841
El Dorado	27,583	64.93%	14,312	33.69%	583	1.38%	13,271	31.24%	42,478
Fresno	104,757	54.30%	86,315	44.74%	1,864	0.96%	18,442	9.56%	192,936
Glenn	6,020	69.74%	2,488	28.82%	124	1.44%	3,532	40.92%	8,632
Humboldt	27,832	51.64%	25,217	46.79%	842	1.57%	2,615	4.85%	53,891
Imperial	13,829	62.01%	8,237	36.94%	235	1.05%	5,592	25.07%	22,301
Inyo	5,863	70.32%	2,360	28.30%	115	1.38%	3,503	42.02%	8,338
Kern	94,776	65.03%	49,567	34.01%	1,401	0.96%	45,209	31.02%	145,744
Kings	13,364	64.10%	7,324	35.13%	160	0.77%	6,040	28.97%	20,848
Lake	10,874	54.83%	8,648	43.61%	309	1.56%	2,226	11.22%	19,831
Lassen	5,352	61.09%	3,254	37.14%	155	1.77%	2,098	23.95%	8,761
Los Angeles	1,424,113	54.50%	1,158,912	44.35%	29,889	1.15%	265,201	10.15%	2,612,914
Madera	13,954	60.04%	8,994	38.70%	293	1.26%	4,960	21.34%	23,241
Marin	56,887	49.02%	57,533	49.58%	1,630	1.40%	-646	-0.56%	116,050
Mariposa	3,989	61.20%	2,399	36.81%	130	1.99%	1,590	24.39%	6,518
Mendocino	16,369	52.09%	14,407	45.85%	646	2.06%	1,962	6.24%	31,422
Merced	24,997	58.85%	17,012	40.05%	468	1.10%	7,985	18.80%	42,477
Modoc	2,995	69.49%	1,219	28.28%	96	2.23%	1,776	41.21%	4,310
Mono	2,659	72.31%	962	26.16%	56	1.53%	1,697	46.15%	3,677
Monterey	55,710	57.16%	40,733	41.79%	1,027	1.05%	14,977	15.37%	97,470
Napa	26,322	57.77%	18,599	40.82%	640	1.41%	7,723	16.95%	45,561
Nevada	19,809	62.36%	11,198	35.25%	761	2.39%	8,611	27.11%	31,768
Orange	635,013	74.70%	206,272	24.27%	8,792	1.03%	428,741	50.43%	850,077
Placer	38,035	62.94%	21,294	35.24%	1,098	1.82%	16,741	27.70%	60,427
Plumas	5,224	56.61%	3,837	41.58%	167	1.81%	1,387	15.03%	9,228
Riverside	182,324	63.48%	102,043	35.53%	2,835	0.99%	80,281	27.95%	287,202
Sacramento	204,922	55.56%	159,128	43.14%	4,791	1.30%	45,794	12.42%	368,841
San Benito	5,695	60.71%	3,554	37.89%	131	1.40%	2,141	22.82%	9,380
San Bernardino	222,071	64.80%	116,454	33.98%	4,180	1.22%	105,617	30.82%	342,705
San Diego	502,344	65.30%	257,029	33.41%	9,894	1.29%	245,315	31.89%	769,267
San Francisco	90,219	31.44%	193,278	67.35%	3,475	1.21%	-103,059	-35.91%	286,972
San Joaquin	81,795	59.61%	53,846	39.24%	1,572	1.15%	27,949	20.37%	137,213
San Luis Obispo	49,035	63.72%	26,946	35.02%	969	1.26%	22,089	28.70%	76,950
San Mateo	135,185	51.87%	122,268	46.91%	3,178	1.22%	12,917	4.96%	260,631
Santa Barbara	89,314	62.76%	51,243	36.01%	1,763	1.23%	38,071	26.75%	142,320
Santa Clara	288,638	54.81%	229,865	43.65%	8,136	1.54%	58,773	11.16%	596,639
Santa Cruz	41,652	45.20%	49,091	53.27%	1,404	1.53%	-7,439	-8.07%	92,147
Shasta	33,041	62.19%	19,298	36.32%	788	1.49%	13,743	25.87%	53,127
Sierra	1,078	56.86%	781	41.19%	37	1.95%	297	15.67%	1,896
Siskiyou	10,544	58.25%	7,130	39.39%	427	2.36%	3,414	18.86%	18,101
Solano	51,678	54.51%	41,982	44.29%	1,138	1.20%	9,696	10.22%	94,798
Sonoma	76,447	51.08%	71,295	47.64%	1,915	1.28%	5,152	3.44%	149,657
Stanislaus	55,665	59.23%	37,459	39.86%	861	0.91%	18,206	19.37%	93,985
Sutter	14,477	71.23%	5,535	27.24%	311	1.53%	8,942	43.99%	20,323
Tehama	11,586	62.78%	6,527	35.37%	342	1.85%	5,059	27.41%	18,455
Trinity	3,544	59.71%	2,218	37.37%	173	2.92%	1,326	22.34%	5,935
Tulare	51,066	63.88%	28,065	35.11%	812	1.01%	23,001	28.77%	79,943
Tuolumne	10,485	58.09%	7,283	40.35%	283	1.56%	3,202	17.74%	18,051
Ventura	151,383	68.67%	66,550	30.19%	2,529	1.14%	84,833	38.48%	220,462
Yolo	24,329	47.84%	25,879	50.89%	645	1.27%	-1,550	-3.05%	50,853
Yuba	9,780	63.52%	5,339	34.68%	278	1.80%	4,441	28.84%	15,397
Total	5,467,009	57.51%	3,922,519	41.27%	115,895	1.22%	1,544,490	16.24%	9,505,423

==== Counties that flipped from Republican to Democratic ====
- Marin
- Santa Cruz

=== Results by city ===
Official outcome by city and unincorporated areas of counties, of which Reagan won 409 and Mondale won 82.
City	County	Ronald Reagan Republican		Walter Mondale Democratic		Various candidates Other parties		Margin		Total Votes	1980 to 1984 Swing %
City	County	#	%	#	%	#	%	#	%	Total Votes	1980 to 1984 Swing %
Alameda	Alameda	13,804	51.51%	12,620	47.09%	374	1.40%	1,184	4.42%	26,798	-7.85%
Albany	Alameda	2,233	29.09%	5,320	69.30%	124	1.62%	-3,087	-40.21%	7,677	-18.00%
Berkeley	Alameda	9,844	16.23%	49,932	82.32%	879	1.45%	-40,088	-66.09%	60,655	-17.59%
Dublin	Alameda	3,923	63.79%	2,141	34.81%	86	1.40%	1,782	28.98%	6,150	N/A
Emeryville	Alameda	613	30.35%	1,368	67.72%	39	1.93%	-755	-37.38%	2,020	-13.80%
Fremont	Alameda	32,201	59.75%	21,033	39.03%	660	1.22%	11,168	20.72%	53,894	-0.07%
Hayward	Alameda	16,530	47.55%	17,795	51.19%	440	1.27%	-1,265	-3.64%	34,765	-3.55%
Livermore	Alameda	15,185	68.15%	6,789	30.47%	309	1.39%	8,396	37.68%	22,283	9.79%
Newark	Alameda	6,154	55.87%	4,699	42.66%	162	1.47%	1,455	13.21%	11,015	-1.64%
Oakland	Alameda	30,293	21.20%	110,625	77.41%	1,989	1.39%	-80,332	-56.21%	142,907	-13.54%
Piedmont	Alameda	3,918	61.38%	2,394	37.51%	71	1.11%	1,524	23.88%	6,383	-13.35%
Pleasanton	Alameda	12,333	69.66%	5,208	29.42%	164	0.93%	7,125	40.24%	17,705	3.98%
San Leandro	Alameda	14,518	49.64%	14,402	49.25%	324	1.11%	116	0.40%	29,244	-7.05%
Union City	Alameda	6,199	47.55%	6,674	51.20%	163	1.25%	-475	-3.64%	13,036	-1.15%
Unincorporated Area	Alameda	24,569	53.32%	20,871	45.29%	638	1.38%	3,698	8.03%	46,078	-5.07%
Unapportioned Absentees	Alameda	91	34.47%	170	64.39%	3	1.14%	-79	-29.92%	264	-33.71%
Unincorporated Area	Alpine	264	56.65%	194	41.63%	8	1.72%	70	15.02%	466	-11.23%
Amador City	Amador	37	55.22%	28	41.79%	2	2.99%	9	13.43%	67	-19.90%
Ione	Amador	452	62.00%	259	35.53%	18	2.47%	193	26.47%	729	8.84%
Jackson	Amador	742	61.02%	463	38.08%	11	0.90%	279	22.94%	1,216	3.60%
Plymouth	Amador	165	60.89%	104	38.38%	2	0.74%	61	22.51%	271	8.36%
Sutter Creek	Amador	545	57.19%	391	41.03%	17	1.78%	154	16.16%	953	5.79%
Unincorporated Area	Amador	4,308	62.18%	2,495	36.01%	125	1.80%	1,813	26.17%	6,928	-0.10%
Unapportioned Absentees	Amador	737	61.47%	448	37.36%	14	1.17%	289	24.10%	1,199	0.17%
Biggs	Butte	330	66.00%	166	33.20%	4	0.80%	164	32.80%	500	16.28%
Chico	Butte	7,328	53.94%	6,050	44.53%	207	1.52%	1,278	9.41%	13,585	1.10%
Gridley	Butte	853	61.41%	522	37.58%	14	1.01%	331	23.83%	1,389	6.34%
Oroville	Butte	2,152	59.15%	1,440	39.58%	46	1.26%	712	19.57%	3,638	-2.42%
Paradise	Butte	8,207	67.10%	3,779	30.90%	245	2.00%	4,428	36.20%	12,231	-4.17%
Unincorporated Area	Butte	26,511	65.26%	13,464	33.15%	646	1.59%	13,047	32.12%	40,621	-0.42%
Angels	Calaveras	616	63.44%	345	35.53%	10	1.03%	271	27.91%	971	6.96%
Unincorporated Area	Calaveras	5,619	63.65%	3,080	34.89%	129	1.46%	2,539	28.76%	8,828	-1.08%
Unapportioned Absentees	Calaveras	1,397	67.23%	656	31.57%	25	1.20%	741	35.66%	2,078	5.27%
Colusa	Colusa	895	63.75%	496	35.33%	13	0.93%	399	28.42%	1,404	11.65%
Williams	Colusa	342	66.41%	170	33.01%	3	0.58%	172	33.40%	515	14.05%
Unincorporated Area	Colusa	1,705	65.35%	855	32.77%	49	1.88%	850	32.58%	2,609	2.02%
Unapportioned Absentees	Colusa	446	67.58%	204	30.91%	10	1.52%	242	36.67%	660	-1.21%
Antioch	Contra Costa	9,251	51.82%	8,450	47.34%	150	0.84%	801	4.49%	17,851	2.70%
Brentwood	Contra Costa	874	54.56%	711	44.38%	17	1.06%	163	10.17%	1,602	11.24%
Clayton	Contra Costa	1,680	71.49%	657	27.96%	13	0.55%	1,023	43.53%	2,350	3.93%
Concord	Contra Costa	26,011	57.32%	18,911	41.67%	460	1.01%	7,100	15.64%	45,382	0.69%
Danville	Contra Costa	11,080	75.32%	3,505	23.83%	125	0.85%	7,575	51.50%	14,710	N/A
El Cerrito	Contra Costa	4,901	38.41%	7,726	60.55%	133	1.04%	-2,825	-22.14%	12,760	-11.82%
Hercules	Contra Costa	1,429	52.54%	1,280	47.06%	11	0.40%	149	5.48%	2,720	-1.71%
Lafayette	Contra Costa	8,913	66.25%	4,391	32.64%	149	1.11%	4,522	33.61%	13,453	-3.14%
Martinez	Contra Costa	6,678	52.81%	5,836	46.15%	131	1.04%	842	6.66%	12,645	-2.27%
Moraga	Contra Costa	6,021	72.23%	2,253	27.03%	62	0.74%	3,768	45.20%	8,336	-1.69%
Pinole	Contra Costa	3,629	52.83%	3,182	46.32%	58	0.84%	447	6.51%	6,869	-6.42%
Pittsburg	Contra Costa	5,661	40.73%	8,130	58.50%	107	0.77%	-2,469	-17.77%	13,898	1.79%
Pleasant Hill	Contra Costa	7,591	55.82%	5,845	42.98%	162	1.19%	1,746	12.84%	13,598	-1.83%
Richmond	Contra Costa	7,282	23.95%	22,898	75.31%	226	0.74%	-15,616	-51.36%	30,406	-7.13%
San Pablo	Contra Costa	2,032	33.18%	4,026	65.74%	66	1.08%	-1,994	-32.56%	6,124	-9.33%
San Ramon	Contra Costa	7,709	72.73%	2,816	26.57%	74	0.70%	4,893	46.16%	10,599	N/A
Walnut Creek	Contra Costa	22,140	67.95%	10,158	31.17%	287	0.88%	11,982	36.77%	32,585	-1.86%
Unincorporated Area	Contra Costa	39,449	56.01%	30,219	42.91%	762	1.08%	9,230	13.11%	70,430	-9.45%
Crescent City	Del Norte	548	56.91%	394	40.91%	21	2.18%	154	15.99%	963	-2.08%
Unincorporated Area	Del Norte	2,848	57.71%	1,971	39.94%	116	2.35%	877	17.77%	4,935	-6.04%
Unapportioned Absentees	Del Norte	600	63.63%	331	35.10%	12	1.27%	269	28.53%	943	-5.44%
Placerville	El Dorado	1,678	60.36%	1,055	37.95%	47	1.69%	623	22.41%	2,780	2.19%
South Lake Tahoe	El Dorado	3,242	60.84%	2,015	37.81%	72	1.35%	1,227	23.02%	5,329	0.77%
Unincorporated Area	El Dorado	19,439	65.51%	9,833	33.14%	400	1.35%	9,606	32.37%	29,672	2.31%
Unapportioned Absentees	El Dorado	3,224	68.64%	1,409	30.00%	64	1.36%	1,815	38.64%	4,697	0.15%
Clovis	Fresno	7,798	61.46%	4,774	37.63%	115	0.91%	3,024	23.84%	12,687	6.07%
Coalinga	Fresno	1,309	63.67%	728	35.41%	19	0.92%	581	28.26%	2,056	17.66%
Firebaugh	Fresno	247	37.14%	413	62.11%	5	0.75%	-166	-24.96%	665	2.03%
Fowler	Fresno	384	50.20%	373	48.76%	8	1.05%	11	1.44%	765	-2.91%
Fresno	Fresno	42,590	48.85%	43,807	50.24%	796	0.91%	-1,217	-1.40%	87,193	-2.28%
Huron	Fresno	88	27.59%	230	72.10%	1	0.31%	-142	-44.51%	319	18.90%
Kerman	Fresno	542	53.50%	461	45.51%	10	0.99%	81	8.00%	1,013	-3.65%
Kingsburg	Fresno	1,249	65.43%	637	33.37%	23	1.20%	612	32.06%	1,909	5.22%
Mendota	Fresno	189	31.03%	417	68.47%	3	0.49%	-228	-37.44%	609	4.84%
Orange Cove	Fresno	268	31.83%	571	67.81%	3	0.36%	-303	-35.99%	842	5.24%
Parlier	Fresno	130	19.49%	532	79.76%	5	0.75%	-402	-60.27%	667	-5.12%
Reedley	Fresno	2,210	61.00%	1,379	38.06%	34	0.94%	831	22.94%	3,623	5.72%
San Joaquin	Fresno	91	46.67%	102	52.31%	2	1.03%	-11	-5.64%	195	4.48%
Sanger	Fresno	1,450	40.03%	2,143	59.17%	29	0.80%	-693	-19.13%	3,622	2.65%
Selma	Fresno	1,523	49.69%	1,520	49.59%	22	0.72%	3	0.10%	3,065	-2.19%
Unincorporated Area	Fresno	33,090	61.95%	19,778	37.03%	548	1.03%	13,312	24.92%	53,416	2.49%
Unapportioned Absentees	Fresno	11,599	57.17%	8,450	41.65%	241	1.19%	3,149	15.52%	20,290	-6.82%
Orland	Glenn	1,119	71.05%	434	27.56%	22	1.40%	685	43.49%	1,575	6.90%
Willows	Glenn	1,173	64.77%	615	33.96%	23	1.27%	558	30.81%	1,811	1.65%
Unincorporated Area	Glenn	3,083	70.71%	1,207	27.68%	70	1.61%	1,876	43.03%	4,360	1.75%
Unapportioned Absentees	Glenn	645	72.80%	232	26.19%	9	1.02%	413	46.61%	886	2.39%
Arcata	Humboldt	2,554	34.73%	4,651	63.25%	148	2.01%	-2,097	-28.52%	7,353	-14.77%
Blue Lake	Humboldt	244	41.64%	326	55.63%	16	2.73%	-82	-13.99%	586	-18.07%
Eureka	Humboldt	5,494	52.92%	4,763	45.88%	124	1.19%	731	7.04%	10,381	-10.37%
Ferndale	Humboldt	442	67.69%	202	30.93%	9	1.38%	240	36.75%	653	-2.40%
Fortuna	Humboldt	2,095	66.63%	1,005	31.97%	44	1.40%	1,090	34.67%	3,144	-3.20%
Rio Dell	Humboldt	603	64.49%	318	34.01%	14	1.50%	285	30.48%	935	-3.68%
Trinidad	Humboldt	78	39.00%	117	58.50%	5	2.50%	-39	-19.50%	200	-18.59%
Unincorporated Area	Humboldt	12,734	51.92%	11,390	46.44%	400	1.63%	1,344	5.48%	24,524	-9.43%
Unapportioned Absentees	Humboldt	3,588	58.68%	2,445	39.98%	82	1.34%	1,143	18.69%	6,115	-6.17%
Brawley	Imperial	2,226	55.87%	1,720	43.17%	38	0.95%	506	12.70%	3,984	-2.07%
Calexico	Imperial	735	38.32%	1,161	60.53%	22	1.15%	-426	-22.21%	1,918	14.33%
Calipatria	Imperial	222	50.80%	205	46.91%	10	2.29%	17	3.89%	437	0.55%
El Centro	Imperial	3,785	64.20%	2,076	35.21%	35	0.59%	1,709	28.99%	5,896	4.12%
Holtville	Imperial	709	70.55%	284	28.26%	12	1.19%	425	42.29%	1,005	14.97%
Imperial	Imperial	651	71.07%	253	27.62%	12	1.31%	398	43.45%	916	10.31%
Westmorland	Imperial	168	53.33%	144	45.71%	3	0.95%	24	7.62%	315	8.66%
Unincorporated Area	Imperial	4,079	66.90%	1,934	31.72%	84	1.38%	2,145	35.18%	6,097	7.90%
Unapportioned Absentees	Imperial	1,254	72.36%	460	26.54%	19	1.10%	794	45.82%	1,733	8.34%
Bishop	Inyo	553	71.73%	209	27.11%	9	1.17%	344	44.62%	771	0.58%
Unincorporated Area	Inyo	4,419	69.61%	1,836	28.92%	93	1.47%	2,583	40.69%	6,348	2.97%
Unapportioned Absentees	Inyo	891	73.09%	315	25.84%	13	1.07%	576	47.25%	1,219	9.53%
Arvin	Kern	569	51.12%	535	48.07%	9	0.81%	34	3.05%	1,113	19.93%
Bakersfield	Kern	29,400	66.70%	14,343	32.54%	332	0.75%	15,057	34.16%	44,075	6.65%
California City	Kern	824	68.33%	364	30.18%	18	1.49%	460	38.14%	1,206	7.96%
Delano	Kern	1,788	44.86%	2,164	54.29%	34	0.85%	-376	-9.43%	3,986	-4.44%
Maricopa	Kern	306	76.31%	90	22.44%	5	1.25%	216	53.87%	401	20.14%
McFarland	Kern	409	46.37%	465	52.72%	8	0.91%	-56	-6.35%	882	6.72%
Ridgecrest	Kern	5,628	72.14%	2,058	26.38%	116	1.49%	3,570	45.76%	7,802	4.96%
Shafter	Kern	1,313	66.72%	640	32.52%	15	0.76%	673	34.20%	1,968	7.00%
Taft	Kern	1,547	75.24%	492	23.93%	17	0.83%	1,055	51.31%	2,056	16.59%
Tehachapi	Kern	935	61.76%	562	37.12%	17	1.12%	373	24.64%	1,514	-0.97%
Wasco	Kern	1,149	57.28%	847	42.22%	10	0.50%	302	15.05%	2,006	4.01%
Unincorporated Area	Kern	41,063	65.34%	21,111	33.59%	671	1.07%	19,952	31.75%	62,845	6.34%
Unapportioned Absentees	Kern	9,845	61.96%	5,896	37.11%	149	0.94%	3,949	24.85%	15,890	-11.51%
Avenal	Kings	476	57.01%	354	42.40%	5	0.60%	122	14.61%	835	19.89%
Corcoran	Kings	823	53.55%	701	45.61%	13	0.85%	122	7.94%	1,537	2.26%
Hanford	Kings	4,571	62.74%	2,650	36.37%	65	0.89%	1,921	26.37%	7,286	12.16%
Lemoore	Kings	1,832	70.49%	750	28.86%	17	0.65%	1,082	41.63%	2,599	14.07%
Unincorporated Area	Kings	4,307	63.58%	2,413	35.62%	54	0.80%	1,894	27.96%	6,774	10.24%
Unapportioned Absentees	Kings	1,355	74.57%	456	25.10%	6	0.33%	899	49.48%	1,817	17.40%
Clearlake	Lake	1,885	42.58%	2,470	55.79%	72	1.63%	-585	-13.21%	4,427	N/A
Lakeport	Lake	1,203	62.92%	680	35.56%	29	1.52%	523	27.35%	1,912	4.36%
Unincorporated Area	Lake	7,786	57.71%	5,498	40.75%	208	1.54%	2,288	16.96%	13,492	1.01%
Susanville	Lassen	1,316	53.67%	1,094	44.62%	42	1.71%	222	9.05%	2,452	4.82%
Unincorporated Area	Lassen	3,391	63.31%	1,867	34.86%	98	1.83%	1,524	28.45%	5,356	4.16%
Unapportioned Absentees	Lassen	645	67.68%	293	30.75%	15	1.57%	352	36.94%	953	6.34%
Agoura Hills	Los Angeles	4,361	71.64%	1,679	27.58%	47	0.77%	2,682	44.06%	6,087	N/A
Alhambra	Los Angeles	11,639	57.08%	8,515	41.76%	237	1.16%	3,124	15.32%	20,391	-2.39%
Arcadia	Los Angeles	17,267	78.78%	4,470	20.40%	180	0.82%	12,797	58.39%	21,917	1.93%
Artesia	Los Angeles	2,396	66.39%	1,189	32.95%	24	0.67%	1,207	33.44%	3,609	12.43%
Avalon	Los Angeles	579	67.09%	272	31.52%	12	1.39%	307	35.57%	863	3.51%
Azusa	Los Angeles	5,408	63.68%	3,002	35.35%	83	0.98%	2,406	28.33%	8,493	10.99%
Baldwin Park	Los Angeles	5,180	54.73%	4,179	44.16%	105	1.11%	1,001	10.58%	9,464	5.84%
Bell	Los Angeles	2,088	56.72%	1,554	42.22%	39	1.06%	534	14.51%	3,681	0.54%
Bell Gardens	Los Angeles	1,599	52.00%	1,441	46.86%	35	1.14%	158	5.14%	3,075	5.57%
Bellflower	Los Angeles	11,240	67.28%	5,299	31.72%	167	1.00%	5,941	35.56%	16,706	7.44%
Beverly Hills	Los Angeles	6,475	46.49%	7,343	52.72%	111	0.80%	-868	-6.23%	13,929	-14.23%
Bradbury	Los Angeles	323	83.90%	60	15.58%	2	0.52%	263	68.31%	385	-1.17%
Burbank	Los Angeles	22,702	68.42%	10,104	30.45%	373	1.12%	12,598	37.97%	33,179	1.67%
Carson	Los Angeles	10,007	40.92%	14,223	58.15%	228	0.93%	-4,216	-17.24%	24,458	7.62%
Cerritos	Los Angeles	12,149	68.88%	5,343	30.29%	147	0.83%	6,806	38.58%	17,639	7.96%
Claremont	Los Angeles	8,219	58.37%	5,706	40.52%	157	1.11%	2,513	17.85%	14,082	-1.81%
Commerce	Los Angeles	815	32.59%	1,659	66.33%	27	1.08%	-844	-33.75%	2,501	5.02%
Compton	Los Angeles	1,735	8.27%	19,118	91.16%	118	0.56%	-17,383	-82.89%	20,971	5.05%
Covina	Los Angeles	10,669	72.69%	3,870	26.37%	138	0.94%	6,799	46.32%	14,677	3.32%
Cudahy	Los Angeles	885	49.39%	874	48.77%	33	1.84%	11	0.61%	1,792	0.23%
Culver City	Los Angeles	7,744	49.35%	7,789	49.64%	158	1.01%	-45	-0.29%	15,691	-3.78%
Downey	Los Angeles	22,584	71.88%	8,534	27.16%	300	0.95%	14,050	44.72%	31,418	7.15%
Duarte	Los Angeles	3,661	65.72%	1,850	33.21%	60	1.08%	1,811	32.51%	5,571	5.23%
El Monte	Los Angeles	7,969	56.40%	6,006	42.51%	154	1.09%	1,963	13.89%	14,129	4.86%
El Segundo	Los Angeles	4,980	75.79%	1,492	22.71%	99	1.51%	3,488	53.08%	6,571	10.26%
Gardena	Los Angeles	6,251	48.83%	6,435	50.27%	116	0.91%	-184	-1.44%	12,802	8.41%
Glendale	Los Angeles	35,711	72.82%	12,689	25.87%	643	1.31%	23,022	46.94%	49,043	-0.16%
Glendora	Los Angeles	12,412	78.00%	3,363	21.13%	137	0.86%	9,049	56.87%	15,912	4.15%
Hawaiian Gardens	Los Angeles	1,125	53.60%	949	45.21%	25	1.19%	176	8.38%	2,099	10.86%
Hawthorne	Los Angeles	9,349	60.32%	5,954	38.42%	195	1.26%	3,395	21.91%	15,498	6.35%
Hermosa Beach	Los Angeles	4,998	60.74%	3,034	36.87%	196	2.38%	1,964	23.87%	8,228	4.11%
Hidden Hills	Los Angeles	599	74.23%	198	24.54%	10	1.24%	401	49.69%	807	-5.58%
Huntington Park	Los Angeles	2,356	51.32%	2,177	47.42%	58	1.26%	179	3.90%	4,591	0.24%
Industry	Los Angeles	44	77.19%	13	22.81%	0	0.00%	31	54.39%	57	33.98%
Inglewood	Los Angeles	6,363	23.57%	20,427	75.68%	201	0.74%	-14,064	-52.11%	26,991	-5.87%
Irwindale	Los Angeles	117	46.80%	130	52.00%	3	1.20%	-13	-5.20%	250	33.19%
La Cañada Flintridge	Los Angeles	8,256	80.05%	1,940	18.81%	117	1.13%	6,316	61.24%	10,313	0.94%
La Habra Heights	Los Angeles	1,979	82.46%	396	16.50%	25	1.04%	1,583	65.96%	2,400	2.76%
La Mirada	Los Angeles	11,892	73.49%	4,167	25.75%	122	0.75%	7,725	47.74%	16,181	7.78%
La Puente	Los Angeles	3,305	49.59%	3,294	49.42%	66	0.99%	11	0.17%	6,665	6.16%
La Verne	Los Angeles	7,913	72.42%	2,895	26.50%	118	1.08%	5,018	45.93%	10,926	7.13%
Lakewood	Los Angeles	19,655	66.92%	9,401	32.01%	314	1.07%	10,254	34.91%	29,370	7.78%
Lancaster	Los Angeles	17,175	80.53%	3,928	18.42%	225	1.05%	13,247	62.11%	21,328	12.09%
Lawndale	Los Angeles	3,743	66.41%	1,800	31.94%	93	1.65%	1,943	34.47%	5,636	15.04%
Lomita	Los Angeles	4,367	68.45%	1,927	30.20%	86	1.35%	2,440	38.24%	6,380	9.94%
Long Beach	Los Angeles	69,413	57.24%	50,386	41.55%	1,473	1.21%	19,027	15.69%	121,272	-2.03%
Los Angeles	Los Angeles	404,232	44.05%	503,393	54.85%	10,100	1.10%	-99,161	-10.81%	917,725	-5.23%
Lynwood	Los Angeles	2,631	28.92%	6,359	69.90%	107	1.18%	-3,728	-40.98%	9,097	-7.40%
Manhattan Beach	Los Angeles	10,669	65.66%	5,282	32.51%	297	1.83%	5,387	33.15%	16,248	4.99%
Maywood	Los Angeles	1,101	51.50%	1,015	47.47%	22	1.03%	86	4.02%	2,138	3.60%
Monrovia	Los Angeles	7,114	66.08%	3,516	32.66%	135	1.25%	3,598	33.42%	10,765	3.85%
Montebello	Los Angeles	6,797	47.23%	7,512	52.20%	83	0.58%	-715	-4.97%	14,392	4.52%
Monterey Park	Los Angeles	7,972	52.54%	7,026	46.31%	175	1.15%	946	6.23%	15,173	5.11%
Norwalk	Los Angeles	14,199	59.37%	9,478	39.63%	241	1.01%	4,721	19.74%	23,918	10.31%
Palmdale	Los Angeles	5,752	80.65%	1,304	18.28%	76	1.07%	4,448	62.37%	7,132	15.25%
Palos Verdes Estates	Los Angeles	5,566	78.58%	1,429	20.18%	88	1.24%	4,137	58.41%	7,083	0.85%
Paramount	Los Angeles	3,519	54.68%	2,843	44.17%	74	1.15%	676	10.50%	6,436	4.13%
Pasadena	Los Angeles	22,223	51.60%	20,259	47.04%	588	1.37%	1,964	4.56%	43,070	-5.66%
Pico Rivera	Los Angeles	6,233	42.69%	8,243	56.46%	123	0.84%	-2,010	-13.77%	14,599	8.65%
Pomona	Los Angeles	14,102	52.91%	12,268	46.03%	282	1.06%	1,834	6.88%	26,652	-0.09%
Rancho Palos Verdes	Los Angeles	14,813	74.94%	4,731	23.93%	223	1.13%	10,082	51.00%	19,767	-0.97%
Redondo Beach	Los Angeles	15,910	67.11%	7,406	31.24%	392	1.65%	8,504	35.87%	23,708	8.51%
Rolling Hills	Los Angeles	892	85.77%	137	13.17%	11	1.06%	755	72.60%	1,040	0.75%
Rolling Hills Estates	Los Angeles	3,137	80.13%	742	18.95%	36	0.92%	2,395	61.17%	3,915	-1.49%
Rosemead	Los Angeles	4,989	53.59%	4,208	45.20%	112	1.20%	781	8.39%	9,309	4.85%
San Dimas	Los Angeles	7,475	72.76%	2,694	26.22%	104	1.01%	4,781	46.54%	10,273	5.80%
San Fernando	Los Angeles	2,026	53.20%	1,725	45.30%	57	1.50%	301	7.90%	3,808	5.92%
San Gabriel	Los Angeles	6,314	63.23%	3,570	35.75%	101	1.01%	2,744	27.48%	9,985	3.40%
San Marino	Los Angeles	5,285	83.88%	957	15.19%	59	0.94%	4,328	68.69%	6,301	-1.48%
Santa Fe Springs	Los Angeles	2,320	50.28%	2,254	48.85%	40	0.87%	66	1.43%	4,614	9.18%
Santa Monica	Los Angeles	17,194	43.58%	21,729	55.07%	534	1.35%	-4,535	-11.49%	39,457	-12.22%
Sierra Madre	Los Angeles	3,723	68.12%	1,663	30.43%	79	1.45%	2,060	37.69%	5,465	-0.53%
Signal Hill	Los Angeles	1,390	59.15%	927	39.45%	33	1.40%	463	19.70%	2,350	3.07%
South El Monte	Los Angeles	1,375	45.83%	1,596	53.20%	29	0.97%	-221	-7.37%	3,000	7.50%
South Gate	Los Angeles	7,132	57.80%	5,088	41.23%	120	0.97%	2,044	16.56%	12,340	1.03%
South Pasadena	Los Angeles	6,199	62.50%	3,576	36.06%	143	1.44%	2,623	26.45%	9,918	-4.37%
Temple City	Los Angeles	8,687	72.36%	3,203	26.68%	116	0.97%	5,484	45.68%	12,006	4.66%
Torrance	Los Angeles	37,899	72.50%	13,737	26.28%	638	1.22%	24,162	46.22%	52,274	8.29%
Walnut	Los Angeles	3,362	71.68%	1,288	27.46%	40	0.85%	2,074	44.22%	4,690	2.49%
West Covina	Los Angeles	19,511	66.81%	9,403	32.20%	289	0.99%	10,108	34.61%	29,203	1.33%
Westlake Village	Los Angeles	2,298	75.15%	740	24.20%	20	0.65%	1,558	50.95%	3,058	N/A
Whittier	Los Angeles	19,743	70.36%	8,069	28.76%	249	0.89%	11,674	41.60%	28,061	0.46%
Unincorporated Area	Los Angeles	167,699	55.27%	132,548	43.69%	3,161	1.04%	35,151	11.59%	303,408	1.18%
Unapportioned Absentees	Los Angeles	142,933	64.24%	75,920	34.12%	3,655	1.64%	67,013	30.12%	222,508	3.56%
Chowchilla	Madera	968	60.24%	622	38.71%	17	1.06%	346	21.53%	1,607	16.99%
Madera	Madera	3,377	51.47%	3,109	47.39%	75	1.14%	268	4.08%	6,561	9.72%
Unincorporated Area	Madera	8,228	62.92%	4,663	35.66%	186	1.42%	3,565	27.26%	13,077	3.96%
Unapportioned Absentees	Madera	1,381	69.19%	600	30.06%	15	0.75%	781	39.13%	1,996	7.00%
Belvedere	Marin	796	64.93%	423	34.50%	7	0.57%	373	30.42%	1,226	-11.12%
Corte Madera	Marin	1,892	46.46%	2,120	52.06%	60	1.47%	-228	-5.60%	4,072	-10.56%
Fairfax	Marin	1,037	29.02%	2,469	69.10%	67	1.88%	-1,432	-40.08%	3,573	-17.08%
Larkspur	Marin	2,910	51.40%	2,680	47.34%	71	1.25%	230	4.06%	5,661	-13.76%
Mill Valley	Marin	2,316	35.99%	4,013	62.36%	106	1.65%	-1,697	-26.37%	6,435	-17.18%
Novato	Marin	10,423	59.18%	6,955	39.49%	235	1.33%	3,468	19.69%	17,613	-4.52%
Ross	Marin	704	55.70%	538	42.56%	22	1.74%	166	13.13%	1,264	-13.90%
San Anselmo	Marin	2,151	36.07%	3,728	62.52%	84	1.41%	-1,577	-26.45%	5,963	-15.17%
San Rafael	Marin	10,068	49.72%	9,911	48.95%	269	1.33%	157	0.78%	20,248	-10.34%
Sausalito	Marin	1,542	42.17%	2,071	56.63%	44	1.20%	-529	-14.47%	3,657	-14.41%
Tiburon	Marin	1,726	56.81%	1,281	42.17%	31	1.02%	445	14.65%	3,038	-9.52%
Unincorporated Area	Marin	12,831	44.65%	15,462	53.81%	443	1.54%	-2,631	-9.16%	28,736	-13.24%
Unapportioned Absentees	Marin	8,491	58.30%	5,882	40.39%	191	1.31%	2,609	17.91%	14,564	-4.69%
Unincorporated Area	Mariposa	3,989	61.20%	2,399	36.81%	130	1.99%	1,590	24.39%	6,518	3.12%
Fort Bragg	Mendocino	1,020	50.40%	966	47.73%	38	1.88%	54	2.67%	2,024	2.51%
Point Arena	Mendocino	88	57.14%	62	40.26%	4	2.60%	26	16.88%	154	-13.69%
Ukiah	Mendocino	2,868	56.33%	2,132	41.88%	91	1.79%	736	14.46%	5,091	10.65%
Willits	Mendocino	917	57.31%	655	40.94%	28	1.75%	262	16.38%	1,600	6.61%
Unincorporated Area	Mendocino	9,860	49.87%	9,473	47.92%	437	2.21%	387	1.96%	19,770	-3.65%
Unapportioned Absentees	Mendocino	1,616	58.07%	1,119	40.21%	48	1.72%	497	17.86%	2,783	4.53%
Atwater	Merced	2,924	63.40%	1,635	35.45%	53	1.15%	1,289	27.95%	4,612	15.88%
Dos Palos	Merced	602	62.90%	342	35.74%	13	1.36%	260	27.17%	957	18.30%
Gustine	Merced	532	44.00%	663	54.84%	14	1.16%	-131	-10.84%	1,209	8.98%
Livingston	Merced	260	41.53%	362	57.83%	4	0.64%	-102	-16.29%	626	7.72%
Los Banos	Merced	1,886	53.47%	1,593	45.17%	48	1.36%	293	8.31%	3,527	14.65%
Merced	Merced	6,718	55.52%	5,260	43.47%	122	1.01%	1,458	12.05%	12,100	11.09%
Unincorporated Area	Merced	9,199	60.31%	5,865	38.45%	190	1.25%	3,334	21.86%	15,254	11.23%
Unapportioned Absentees	Merced	2,876	68.61%	1,292	30.82%	24	0.57%	1,584	37.79%	4,192	18.60%
Alturas	Modoc	757	63.99%	408	34.49%	18	1.52%	349	29.50%	1,183	5.88%
Unincorporated Area	Modoc	1,893	72.14%	662	25.23%	69	2.63%	1,231	46.91%	2,624	1.07%
Unapportioned Absentees	Modoc	345	68.59%	149	29.62%	9	1.79%	196	38.97%	503	1.83%
Unincorporated Area	Mono	2,659	72.31%	962	26.16%	56	1.52%	1,697	46.15%	3,677	9.12%
Carmel-by-the-Sea	Monterey	1,534	52.57%	1,341	45.96%	43	1.47%	193	6.61%	2,918	-16.58%
Del Rey Oaks	Monterey	499	58.78%	335	39.46%	15	1.77%	164	19.32%	849	-11.43%
Gonzales	Monterey	314	50.16%	311	49.68%	1	0.16%	3	0.48%	626	12.50%
Greenfield	Monterey	517	57.83%	371	41.50%	6	0.67%	146	16.33%	894	12.93%
King City	Monterey	970	69.14%	426	30.36%	7	0.50%	544	38.77%	1,403	-3.16%
Marina	Monterey	2,583	59.07%	1,751	40.04%	39	0.89%	832	19.03%	4,373	1.95%
Monterey	Monterey	5,963	53.76%	4,980	44.90%	149	1.34%	983	8.86%	11,092	-8.44%
Pacific Grove	Monterey	3,826	46.71%	4,260	52.01%	105	1.28%	-434	-5.30%	8,191	-13.55%
Salinas	Monterey	15,215	58.83%	10,428	40.32%	221	0.85%	4,787	18.51%	25,864	-0.23%
Sand City	Monterey	38	44.71%	47	55.29%	0	0.00%	-9	-10.59%	85	-3.04%
Seaside	Monterey	3,201	40.71%	4,603	58.55%	58	0.74%	-1,402	-17.83%	7,862	-0.15%
Soledad	Monterey	402	41.06%	573	58.53%	4	0.41%	-171	-17.47%	979	12.51%
Unincorporated Area	Monterey	20,483	63.86%	11,274	35.15%	317	0.99%	9,209	28.71%	32,074	-5.40%
Unapportioned Absentees	Monterey	165	82.50%	33	16.50%	2	1.00%	132	66.00%	200	29.51%
Calistoga	Napa	848	53.88%	697	44.28%	29	1.84%	151	9.59%	1,574	-7.31%
Napa	Napa	12,651	56.02%	9,636	42.67%	294	1.30%	3,015	13.35%	22,581	-2.04%
St. Helena	Napa	1,189	59.48%	789	39.47%	21	1.05%	400	20.01%	1,999	-13.62%
Yountville	Napa	529	44.49%	649	54.58%	11	0.93%	-120	-10.09%	1,189	-2.58%
Unincorporated Area	Napa	7,840	60.26%	4,945	38.01%	225	1.73%	2,895	22.25%	13,010	-3.16%
Unapportioned Absentees	Napa	3,265	62.69%	1,883	36.16%	60	1.15%	1,382	26.54%	5,208	0.20%
Grass Valley	Nevada	1,723	59.64%	1,086	37.59%	80	2.77%	637	22.05%	2,889	3.49%
Nevada City	Nevada	542	44.57%	646	53.13%	28	2.30%	-104	-8.55%	1,216	-18.65%
Unincorporated Area	Nevada	14,529	62.91%	8,019	34.72%	546	2.36%	6,510	28.19%	23,094	-2.97%
Unapportioned Absentees	Nevada	3,015	65.99%	1,447	31.67%	107	2.34%	1,568	34.32%	4,569	N/A
Anaheim	Orange	59,238	74.66%	19,266	24.28%	836	1.05%	39,972	50.38%	79,340	5.64%
Brea	Orange	10,913	77.96%	2,976	21.26%	110	0.79%	7,937	56.70%	13,999	6.45%
Buena Park	Orange	16,203	72.09%	6,036	26.86%	237	1.05%	10,167	45.23%	22,476	9.93%
Costa Mesa	Orange	24,652	72.39%	8,908	26.16%	493	1.45%	15,744	46.23%	34,053	7.52%
Cypress	Orange	12,232	73.95%	4,167	25.19%	143	0.86%	8,065	48.75%	16,542	7.36%
Fountain Valley	Orange	18,426	78.25%	4,922	20.90%	201	0.85%	13,504	57.34%	23,549	6.73%
Fullerton	Orange	32,206	74.21%	10,734	24.73%	460	1.06%	21,472	49.47%	43,400	4.86%
Garden Grove	Orange	33,206	73.13%	11,656	25.67%	546	1.20%	21,550	47.46%	45,408	7.25%
Huntington Beach	Orange	53,772	74.05%	17,985	24.77%	860	1.18%	35,787	49.28%	72,617	5.94%
Irvine	Orange	25,322	73.25%	8,905	25.76%	342	0.99%	16,417	47.49%	34,569	1.14%
La Habra	Orange	13,232	73.56%	4,594	25.54%	161	0.90%	8,638	48.02%	17,987	7.00%
La Palma	Orange	4,744	76.63%	1,399	22.60%	48	0.78%	3,345	54.03%	6,191	10.13%
Laguna Beach	Orange	5,049	57.13%	3,654	41.34%	135	1.53%	1,395	15.78%	8,838	-4.22%
Los Alamitos	Orange	3,068	70.38%	1,249	28.65%	42	0.96%	1,819	41.73%	4,359	9.35%
Newport Beach	Orange	26,492	79.11%	6,605	19.72%	389	1.16%	19,887	59.39%	33,486	1.27%
Orange	Orange	29,957	77.05%	8,529	21.94%	395	1.02%	21,428	55.11%	38,881	4.51%
Placentia	Orange	11,375	76.39%	3,396	22.81%	119	0.80%	7,979	53.59%	14,890	6.48%
San Clemente	Orange	9,950	76.68%	2,888	22.26%	138	1.06%	7,062	54.42%	12,976	2.44%
San Juan Capistrano	Orange	6,853	77.32%	1,914	21.60%	96	1.08%	4,939	55.73%	8,863	2.92%
Santa Ana	Orange	33,677	66.63%	16,288	32.22%	580	1.15%	17,389	34.40%	50,545	5.53%
Seal Beach	Orange	9,212	65.27%	4,728	33.50%	173	1.23%	4,484	31.77%	14,113	-2.13%
Stanton	Orange	5,689	68.16%	2,581	30.92%	77	0.92%	3,108	37.23%	8,347	4.84%
Tustin	Orange	10,375	75.88%	3,166	23.16%	132	0.97%	7,209	52.72%	13,673	2.76%
Villa Park	Orange	2,924	87.10%	414	12.33%	19	0.57%	2,510	74.77%	3,357	1.39%
Westminster	Orange	20,561	73.09%	7,246	25.76%	323	1.15%	13,315	47.33%	28,130	7.21%
Yorba Linda	Orange	12,566	82.63%	2,537	16.68%	104	0.68%	10,029	65.95%	15,207	8.78%
Unincorporated Area	Orange	94,578	77.25%	26,727	21.83%	1,127	0.92%	67,851	55.42%	122,432	2.65%
Unapportioned Absentees	Orange	48,541	78.48%	12,802	20.70%	506	0.82%	35,739	57.78%	61,849	3.87%
Auburn	Placer	2,168	61.24%	1,287	36.36%	85	2.40%	881	24.89%	3,540	7.71%
Colfax	Placer	214	52.45%	186	45.59%	8	1.96%	28	6.86%	408	8.19%
Lincoln	Placer	811	55.78%	618	42.50%	25	1.72%	193	13.27%	1,454	15.26%
Rocklin	Placer	2,278	66.76%	1,090	31.95%	44	1.29%	1,188	34.82%	3,412	10.47%
Roseville	Placer	6,746	60.47%	4,266	38.24%	144	1.29%	2,480	22.23%	11,156	14.45%
Unincorporated Area	Placer	21,429	63.71%	11,515	34.24%	689	2.05%	9,914	29.48%	33,633	3.65%
Unapportioned Absentees	Placer	4,389	64.32%	2,332	34.17%	103	1.51%	2,057	30.14%	6,824	1.42%
Portola	Plumas	354	47.26%	379	50.60%	16	2.14%	-25	-3.34%	749	1.63%
Unincorporated Area	Plumas	4,134	56.82%	3,002	41.26%	139	1.91%	1,132	15.56%	7,275	-1.86%
Unapportioned Absentees	Plumas	736	61.13%	456	37.87%	12	1.00%	280	23.26%	1,204	3.92%
Banning	Riverside	3,002	52.96%	2,584	45.59%	82	1.45%	418	7.37%	5,668	-6.35%
Beaumont	Riverside	1,623	58.51%	1,113	40.12%	38	1.37%	510	18.39%	2,774	-0.87%
Blythe	Riverside	1,093	56.51%	820	42.40%	21	1.09%	273	14.12%	1,934	-3.86%
Cathedral City	Riverside	2,901	60.24%	1,874	38.91%	41	0.85%	1,027	21.32%	4,816	N/A
Coachella	Riverside	438	29.65%	1,026	69.47%	13	0.88%	-588	-39.81%	1,477	12.40%
Corona	Riverside	10,455	70.10%	4,358	29.22%	102	0.68%	6,097	40.88%	14,915	10.67%
Desert Hot Springs	Riverside	1,498	56.51%	1,124	42.40%	29	1.09%	374	14.11%	2,651	-3.70%
Hemet	Riverside	8,600	64.00%	4,717	35.10%	120	0.89%	3,883	28.90%	13,437	-7.23%
Indian Wells	Riverside	1,072	88.23%	137	11.28%	6	0.49%	935	76.95%	1,215	13.80%
Indio	Riverside	3,155	56.19%	2,413	42.97%	47	0.84%	742	13.21%	5,615	2.65%
La Quinta	Riverside	1,481	70.86%	594	28.42%	15	0.72%	887	42.44%	2,090	N/A
Lake Elsinore	Riverside	1,979	60.34%	1,269	38.69%	32	0.98%	710	21.65%	3,280	15.53%
Norco	Riverside	5,238	75.68%	1,618	23.38%	65	0.94%	3,620	52.30%	6,921	8.37%
Palm Desert	Riverside	5,361	75.68%	1,675	23.64%	48	0.68%	3,686	52.03%	7,084	-0.61%
Palm Springs	Riverside	8,391	58.68%	5,811	40.64%	97	0.68%	2,580	18.04%	14,299	-10.49%
Perris	Riverside	1,478	52.73%	1,300	46.38%	25	0.89%	178	6.35%	2,803	0.27%
Rancho Mirage	Riverside	2,896	72.55%	1,077	26.98%	19	0.48%	1,819	45.57%	3,992	-5.46%
Riverside	Riverside	41,537	60.12%	26,814	38.81%	737	1.07%	14,723	21.31%	69,088	-0.34%
San Jacinto	Riverside	1,697	57.82%	1,196	40.75%	42	1.43%	501	17.07%	2,935	2.53%
Unincorporated Area	Riverside	78,429	65.24%	40,523	33.71%	1,256	1.04%	37,906	31.53%	120,208	0.61%
Folsom	Sacramento	3,926	68.89%	1,705	29.92%	68	1.19%	2,221	38.97%	5,699	13.58%
Galt	Sacramento	1,125	61.58%	682	37.33%	20	1.09%	443	24.25%	1,827	7.25%
Isleton	Sacramento	155	49.21%	157	49.84%	3	0.95%	-2	-0.63%	315	14.75%
Sacramento	Sacramento	57,642	44.42%	70,512	54.33%	1,621	1.25%	-12,870	-9.92%	129,775	2.25%
Unincorporated Area	Sacramento	142,008	61.45%	86,024	37.22%	3,078	1.33%	55,984	24.22%	231,110	6.73%
Unapportioned Absentees	Sacramento	66	57.39%	48	41.74%	1	0.87%	18	15.65%	115	-5.24%
Hollister	San Benito	2,055	54.01%	1,706	44.84%	44	1.16%	349	9.17%	3,805	7.14%
San Juan Bautista	San Benito	287	51.53%	262	47.04%	8	1.44%	25	4.49%	557	18.04%
Unincorporated Area	San Benito	2,473	66.50%	1,185	31.86%	61	1.64%	1,288	34.63%	3,719	4.73%
Unapportioned Absentees	San Benito	880	67.74%	401	30.87%	18	1.39%	479	36.87%	1,299	-4.76%
Adelanto	San Bernardino	533	68.69%	229	29.51%	14	1.80%	304	39.18%	776	11.38%
Barstow	San Bernardino	3,212	56.83%	2,378	42.07%	62	1.10%	834	14.76%	5,652	7.42%
Big Bear Lake	San Bernardino	1,689	75.64%	506	22.66%	38	1.70%	1,183	52.98%	2,233	N/A
Chino	San Bernardino	8,817	72.69%	3,188	26.28%	124	1.02%	5,629	46.41%	12,129	9.73%
Colton	San Bernardino	3,477	43.97%	4,351	55.02%	80	1.01%	-874	-11.05%	7,908	6.19%
Fontana	San Bernardino	7,402	54.49%	6,044	44.50%	137	1.01%	1,358	10.00%	13,583	-2.35%
Grand Terrace	San Bernardino	2,609	69.63%	1,090	29.09%	48	1.28%	1,519	40.54%	3,747	3.92%
Loma Linda	San Bernardino	2,951	73.74%	956	23.89%	95	2.37%	1,995	49.85%	4,002	-0.74%
Montclair	San Bernardino	4,974	65.86%	2,480	32.84%	98	1.30%	2,494	33.02%	7,552	4.03%
Needles	San Bernardino	819	55.94%	624	42.62%	21	1.43%	195	13.32%	1,464	1.58%
Ontario	San Bernardino	20,375	67.32%	9,577	31.64%	315	1.04%	10,798	35.68%	30,267	8.19%
Rancho Cucamonga	San Bernardino	16,016	74.06%	5,394	24.94%	215	0.99%	10,622	49.12%	21,625	7.12%
Redlands	San Bernardino	13,757	68.65%	6,074	30.31%	208	1.04%	7,683	38.34%	20,039	4.31%
Rialto	San Bernardino	8,275	54.51%	6,756	44.50%	151	0.99%	1,519	10.01%	15,182	-2.60%
San Bernardino	San Bernardino	21,680	50.11%	21,144	48.87%	442	1.02%	536	1.24%	43,266	-1.26%
Upland	San Bernardino	16,059	74.66%	5,250	24.41%	201	0.93%	10,809	50.25%	21,510	7.36%
Victorville	San Bernardino	4,197	65.84%	2,076	32.56%	102	1.60%	2,121	33.27%	6,375	1.04%
Unincorporated Area	San Bernardino	85,229	67.97%	38,337	30.57%	1,829	1.46%	46,892	37.40%	125,395	3.38%
Carlsbad	San Diego	13,388	71.78%	5,034	26.99%	229	1.23%	8,354	44.79%	18,651	-3.94%
Chula Vista	San Diego	21,125	66.70%	10,196	32.19%	351	1.11%	10,929	34.51%	31,672	0.22%
Coronado	San Diego	6,278	77.05%	1,781	21.86%	89	1.09%	4,497	55.19%	8,148	1.81%
Del Mar	San Diego	1,670	54.15%	1,369	44.39%	45	1.46%	301	9.76%	3,084	0.43%
El Cajon	San Diego	19,837	70.18%	8,130	28.76%	300	1.06%	11,707	41.42%	28,267	3.21%
Escondido	San Diego	20,262	73.19%	7,091	25.61%	333	1.20%	13,171	47.57%	27,686	-1.64%
Imperial Beach	San Diego	3,817	67.65%	1,733	30.72%	92	1.63%	2,084	36.94%	5,642	6.92%
La Mesa	San Diego	16,601	65.89%	8,308	32.97%	286	1.14%	8,293	32.92%	25,195	-0.86%
Lemon Grove	San Diego	5,253	63.58%	2,879	34.85%	130	1.57%	2,374	28.73%	8,262	1.64%
National City	San Diego	4,935	52.74%	4,303	45.99%	119	1.27%	632	6.75%	9,357	-6.04%
Oceanside	San Diego	20,800	68.36%	9,267	30.46%	358	1.18%	11,533	37.91%	30,425	-5.48%
Poway	San Diego	11,035	76.77%	3,152	21.93%	188	1.31%	7,883	54.84%	14,375	N/A
San Diego	San Diego	218,025	59.61%	142,985	39.10%	4,716	1.29%	75,040	20.52%	365,726	-3.12%
San Marcos	San Diego	5,780	72.92%	2,058	25.97%	88	1.11%	3,722	46.96%	7,926	-4.77%
Santee	San Diego	12,565	73.27%	4,389	25.59%	194	1.13%	8,176	47.68%	17,148	N/A
Vista	San Diego	11,177	71.92%	4,167	26.81%	197	1.27%	7,010	45.11%	15,541	-3.54%
Unincorporated Area	San Diego	109,796	72.16%	40,187	26.41%	2,179	1.43%	69,609	45.75%	152,162	-0.52%
San Francisco	San Francisco	90,219	31.44%	193,278	67.35%	3,475	1.21%	-103,059	-35.91%	286,972	-15.36%
Escalon	San Joaquin	800	67.23%	373	31.34%	17	1.43%	427	35.88%	1,190	15.64%
Lodi	San Joaquin	10,795	72.16%	3,976	26.58%	188	1.26%	6,819	45.58%	14,959	2.06%
Manteca	San Joaquin	6,241	62.31%	3,655	36.49%	120	1.20%	2,586	25.82%	10,016	13.04%
Ripon	San Joaquin	1,371	77.24%	389	21.92%	15	0.85%	982	55.32%	1,775	9.01%
Stockton	San Joaquin	27,576	51.56%	25,375	47.45%	531	0.99%	2,201	4.12%	53,482	-4.38%
Tracy	San Joaquin	4,315	59.63%	2,831	39.12%	90	1.24%	1,484	20.51%	7,236	10.28%
Unincorporated Area	San Joaquin	24,246	62.41%	14,107	36.31%	496	1.28%	10,139	26.10%	38,849	1.39%
Unapportioned Absentees	San Joaquin	6,451	66.46%	3,140	32.35%	115	1.18%	3,311	34.11%	9,706	0.46%
Arroyo Grande	San Luis Obispo	4,092	67.08%	1,934	31.70%	74	1.21%	2,158	35.38%	6,100	-1.00%
Atascadero	San Luis Obispo	5,539	69.00%	2,390	29.77%	98	1.22%	3,149	39.23%	8,027	7.64%
El Paso de Robles	San Luis Obispo	3,505	71.93%	1,310	26.88%	58	1.19%	2,195	45.04%	4,873	3.46%
Grover City	San Luis Obispo	2,069	59.75%	1,361	39.30%	33	0.95%	708	20.44%	3,463	9.91%
Morro Bay	San Luis Obispo	2,789	57.46%	1,998	41.16%	67	1.38%	791	16.30%	4,854	-5.25%
Pismo Beach	San Luis Obispo	1,849	62.09%	1,097	36.84%	32	1.07%	752	25.25%	2,978	4.61%
San Luis Obispo	San Luis Obispo	10,237	57.41%	7,360	41.28%	234	1.31%	2,877	16.13%	17,831	2.19%
Unincorporated Area	San Luis Obispo	18,955	65.76%	9,496	32.94%	373	1.29%	9,459	32.82%	28,824	1.05%
Atherton	San Mateo	2,803	72.64%	1,015	26.30%	41	1.06%	1,788	46.33%	3,859	-7.96%
Belmont	San Mateo	6,207	56.34%	4,658	42.28%	153	1.39%	1,549	14.06%	11,018	-5.84%
Brisbane	San Mateo	468	39.13%	710	59.36%	18	1.51%	-242	-20.23%	1,196	-12.88%
Burlingame	San Mateo	6,735	56.95%	4,942	41.79%	149	1.26%	1,793	15.16%	11,826	-7.78%
Colma	San Mateo	112	41.48%	154	57.04%	4	1.48%	-42	-15.56%	270	-20.24%
Daly City	San Mateo	9,528	42.28%	12,861	57.08%	144	0.64%	-3,333	-14.79%	22,533	-6.52%
East Palo Alto	San Mateo	770	13.19%	4,954	84.86%	114	1.95%	-4,184	-71.67%	5,838	N/A
Foster City	San Mateo	6,038	61.52%	3,690	37.60%	87	0.89%	2,348	23.92%	9,815	-4.44%
Half Moon Bay	San Mateo	1,698	56.28%	1,259	41.73%	60	1.99%	439	14.55%	3,017	0.71%
Hillsborough	San Mateo	3,749	77.84%	1,025	21.28%	42	0.87%	2,724	56.56%	4,816	-5.82%
Menlo Park	San Mateo	6,047	45.54%	7,029	52.94%	201	1.51%	-982	-7.40%	13,277	-17.23%
Millbrae	San Mateo	5,126	58.60%	3,538	40.44%	84	0.96%	1,588	18.15%	8,748	-4.95%
Pacifica	San Mateo	6,078	43.53%	7,738	55.42%	147	1.05%	-1,660	-11.89%	13,963	-8.43%
Portola Valley	San Mateo	1,397	60.63%	876	38.02%	31	1.35%	521	22.61%	2,304	-14.19%
Redwood City	San Mateo	11,432	51.81%	10,290	46.63%	343	1.55%	1,142	5.18%	22,065	-3.96%
San Bruno	San Mateo	6,543	49.17%	6,641	49.91%	122	0.92%	-98	-0.74%	13,306	-4.80%
San Carlos	San Mateo	7,541	59.90%	4,891	38.85%	157	1.25%	2,650	21.05%	12,589	-3.98%
San Mateo	San Mateo	17,512	53.49%	14,845	45.34%	382	1.17%	2,667	8.15%	32,739	-6.77%
South San Francisco	San Mateo	7,477	44.41%	9,216	54.74%	143	0.85%	-1,739	-10.33%	16,836	-4.92%
Woodside	San Mateo	1,792	63.48%	986	34.93%	45	1.59%	806	28.55%	2,823	-12.35%
Unincorporated Area	San Mateo	9,928	48.03%	10,376	50.20%	366	1.77%	-448	-2.17%	20,670	2.69%
Unapportioned Absentees	San Mateo	16,204	59.74%	10,574	38.99%	345	1.27%	5,630	20.76%	27,123	-7.04%
Carpinteria	Santa Barbara	2,747	62.09%	1,613	36.46%	64	1.45%	1,134	25.63%	4,424	8.99%
Guadalupe	Santa Barbara	325	49.77%	321	49.16%	7	1.07%	4	0.61%	653	12.09%
Lompoc	Santa Barbara	7,378	69.16%	3,202	30.01%	88	0.82%	4,176	39.15%	10,668	8.73%
Santa Barbara	Santa Barbara	19,278	51.32%	17,712	47.15%	573	1.53%	1,566	4.17%	37,563	-0.08%
Santa Maria	Santa Barbara	11,137	70.39%	4,555	28.79%	129	0.82%	6,582	41.60%	15,821	6.65%
Unincorporated Area	Santa Barbara	48,449	66.20%	23,840	32.57%	902	1.23%	24,609	33.62%	73,191	6.46%
Campbell	Santa Clara	8,050	56.86%	5,898	41.66%	210	1.48%	2,152	15.20%	14,158	2.97%
Cupertino	Santa Clara	11,344	62.48%	6,531	35.97%	280	1.54%	4,813	26.51%	18,155	0.10%
Gilroy	Santa Clara	4,304	54.25%	3,526	44.44%	104	1.31%	778	9.81%	7,934	0.03%
Los Altos	Santa Clara	10,746	63.79%	5,870	34.84%	231	1.37%	4,876	28.94%	16,847	-6.91%
Los Altos Hills	Santa Clara	3,149	68.85%	1,373	30.02%	52	1.14%	1,776	38.83%	4,574	-5.33%
Los Gatos	Santa Clara	8,906	61.62%	5,360	37.09%	186	1.29%	3,546	24.54%	14,452	-0.88%
Milpitas	Santa Clara	7,066	56.61%	5,213	41.76%	203	1.63%	1,853	14.85%	12,482	8.16%
Monte Sereno	Santa Clara	1,396	71.01%	548	27.87%	22	1.12%	848	43.13%	1,966	5.38%
Morgan Hill	Santa Clara	4,938	64.10%	2,659	34.52%	106	1.38%	2,279	29.59%	7,703	0.16%
Mountain View	Santa Clara	13,221	50.38%	12,457	47.47%	564	2.15%	764	2.91%	26,242	-3.92%
Palo Alto	Santa Clara	12,516	38.27%	19,600	59.93%	589	1.80%	-7,084	-21.66%	32,705	-17.73%
San Jose	Santa Clara	123,567	54.29%	100,873	44.32%	3,181	1.40%	22,694	9.97%	227,621	-0.06%
Santa Clara	Santa Clara	18,103	52.20%	15,965	46.04%	612	1.76%	2,138	6.16%	34,680	2.54%
Saratoga	Santa Clara	11,817	70.60%	4,730	28.26%	192	1.15%	7,087	42.34%	16,739	-0.89%
Sunnyvale	Santa Clara	27,409	57.76%	19,162	40.38%	884	1.86%	8,247	17.38%	47,455	1.27%
Unincorporated Area	Santa Clara	22,106	51.50%	20,100	46.82%	720	1.68%	2,006	4.67%	42,926	-0.80%
Capitola	Santa Cruz	1,834	43.67%	2,320	55.24%	46	1.10%	-486	-11.57%	4,200	-12.73%
Santa Cruz	Santa Cruz	6,956	31.77%	14,597	66.67%	341	1.56%	-7,641	-34.90%	21,894	-23.34%
Scotts Valley	Santa Cruz	2,339	69.20%	996	29.47%	45	1.33%	1,343	39.73%	3,380	2.23%
Watsonville	Santa Cruz	2,728	48.32%	2,871	50.85%	47	0.83%	-143	-2.53%	5,646	-9.39%
Unincorporated Area	Santa Cruz	22,429	47.56%	23,954	50.80%	774	1.64%	-1,525	-3.23%	47,157	-12.35%
Unapportioned Absentees	Santa Cruz	5,366	54.37%	4,353	44.10%	151	1.53%	1,013	10.26%	9,870	-12.88%
Anderson	Shasta	1,453	56.67%	1,077	42.00%	34	1.33%	376	14.66%	2,564	2.30%
Redding	Shasta	13,189	62.43%	7,663	36.27%	274	1.30%	5,526	26.16%	21,126	1.80%
Unincorporated Area	Shasta	18,399	62.50%	10,558	35.87%	480	1.63%	7,841	26.64%	29,437	-1.02%
Loyalton	Sierra	198	48.06%	209	50.73%	5	1.21%	-11	-2.67%	412	-1.62%
Unincorporated Area	Sierra	712	59.09%	466	38.67%	27	2.24%	246	20.41%	1,205	2.78%
Unapportioned Absentees	Sierra	168	60.22%	106	37.99%	5	1.79%	62	22.22%	279	9.49%
Dorris	Siskiyou	186	58.31%	130	40.75%	3	0.94%	56	17.55%	319	-2.37%
Dunsmuir	Siskiyou	302	42.30%	394	55.18%	18	2.52%	-92	-12.89%	714	-7.93%
Etna	Siskiyou	221	65.97%	104	31.04%	10	2.99%	117	34.93%	335	3.18%
Fort Jones	Siskiyou	157	63.31%	86	34.68%	5	2.02%	71	28.63%	248	-2.14%
Montague	Siskiyou	226	56.22%	168	41.79%	8	1.99%	58	14.43%	402	-5.34%
Mt. Shasta	Siskiyou	589	52.97%	498	44.78%	25	2.25%	91	8.18%	1,112	-4.18%
Tulelake	Siskiyou	189	72.97%	61	23.55%	9	3.47%	128	49.42%	259	4.21%
Weed	Siskiyou	373	36.97%	616	61.05%	20	1.98%	-243	-24.08%	1,009	1.53%
Yreka	Siskiyou	1,676	61.32%	1,004	36.74%	53	1.94%	672	24.59%	2,733	-3.92%
Unincorporated Area	Siskiyou	5,406	61.04%	3,225	36.41%	226	2.55%	2,181	24.62%	8,857	-2.02%
Unapportioned Absentees	Siskiyou	1,219	57.69%	844	39.94%	50	2.37%	375	17.75%	2,113	-10.43%
Benicia	Solano	4,424	53.53%	3,726	45.09%	114	1.38%	698	8.45%	8,264	-0.36%
Dixon	Solano	1,860	60.59%	1,174	38.24%	36	1.17%	686	22.35%	3,070	-1.34%
Fairfield	Solano	10,622	57.75%	7,537	40.98%	233	1.27%	3,085	16.77%	18,392	-3.35%
Rio Vista	Solano	831	62.91%	482	36.49%	8	0.61%	349	26.42%	1,321	9.60%
Suisun City	Solano	2,214	54.65%	1,781	43.96%	56	1.38%	433	10.69%	4,051	-6.33%
Vacaville	Solano	9,556	61.63%	5,752	37.10%	197	1.27%	3,804	24.53%	15,505	-3.27%
Vallejo	Solano	12,624	43.14%	16,332	55.81%	308	1.05%	-3,708	-12.67%	29,264	-5.29%
Unincorporated Area	Solano	4,239	64.04%	2,285	34.52%	95	1.44%	1,954	29.52%	6,619	-1.79%
Unapportioned Absentees	Solano	5,308	63.86%	2,913	35.05%	91	1.09%	2,395	28.81%	8,312	-2.09%
Cloverdale	Sonoma	892	53.80%	746	44.99%	20	1.21%	146	8.81%	1,658	-4.94%
Cotati	Sonoma	633	37.93%	1,008	60.40%	28	1.68%	-375	-22.47%	1,669	-4.27%
Healdsburg	Sonoma	2,097	57.80%	1,484	40.90%	47	1.30%	613	16.90%	3,628	-0.93%
Petaluma	Sonoma	8,421	51.99%	7,583	46.81%	194	1.20%	838	5.17%	16,198	-6.52%
Rohnert Park	Sonoma	6,432	54.53%	5,245	44.47%	118	1.00%	1,187	10.06%	11,795	-2.00%
Santa Rosa	Sonoma	23,349	53.31%	19,952	45.55%	500	1.14%	3,397	7.76%	43,801	-10.03%
Sebastopol	Sonoma	1,349	46.42%	1,518	52.24%	39	1.34%	-169	-5.82%	2,906	-14.48%
Sonoma	Sonoma	1,986	53.56%	1,684	45.42%	38	1.02%	302	8.14%	3,708	-8.04%
Unincorporated Area	Sonoma	31,288	48.66%	32,075	49.89%	931	1.45%	-787	-1.22%	64,294	-9.67%
Ceres	Stanislaus	2,449	57.38%	1,784	41.80%	35	0.82%	665	15.58%	4,268	15.17%
Hughson	Stanislaus	457	58.97%	310	40.00%	8	1.03%	147	18.97%	775	11.85%
Modesto	Stanislaus	23,111	58.44%	16,130	40.79%	305	0.77%	6,981	17.65%	39,546	9.51%
Newman	Stanislaus	513	50.05%	500	48.78%	12	1.17%	13	1.27%	1,025	16.50%
Oakdale	Stanislaus	1,707	58.82%	1,162	40.04%	33	1.14%	545	18.78%	2,902	12.92%
Patterson	Stanislaus	582	55.17%	462	43.79%	11	1.04%	120	11.37%	1,055	13.50%
Riverbank	Stanislaus	666	50.76%	634	48.32%	12	0.91%	32	2.44%	1,312	31.33%
Turlock	Stanislaus	5,739	63.42%	3,242	35.83%	68	0.75%	2,497	27.59%	9,049	8.09%
Waterford	Stanislaus	467	57.16%	334	40.88%	16	1.96%	133	16.28%	817	9.85%
Unincorporated Area	Stanislaus	13,771	58.35%	9,558	40.50%	271	1.15%	4,213	17.85%	23,600	7.84%
Unapportioned Absentees	Stanislaus	6,203	64.37%	3,343	34.69%	90	0.93%	2,860	29.68%	9,636	13.33%
Live Oak	Sutter	534	66.34%	255	31.68%	16	1.99%	279	34.66%	805	20.47%
Yuba City	Sutter	4,311	67.42%	1,972	30.84%	111	1.74%	2,339	36.58%	6,394	3.36%
Unincorporated Area	Sutter	8,217	72.86%	2,888	25.61%	173	1.53%	5,329	47.25%	11,278	9.73%
Unapportioned Absentees	Sutter	1,415	76.65%	420	22.75%	11	0.60%	995	53.90%	1,846	2.97%
Corning	Tehama	1,094	60.78%	671	37.28%	35	1.94%	423	23.50%	1,800	5.25%
Red Bluff	Tehama	2,276	59.43%	1,488	38.85%	66	1.72%	788	20.57%	3,830	1.51%
Tehama	Tehama	81	51.59%	73	46.50%	3	1.91%	8	5.10%	157	-20.49%
Unincorporated Area	Tehama	6,986	63.42%	3,820	34.68%	209	1.90%	3,166	28.74%	11,015	-3.02%
Unapportioned Absentees	Tehama	1,149	69.51%	475	28.74%	29	1.75%	674	40.77%	1,653	7.02%
Unincorporated Area	Trinity	3,544	59.71%	2,218	37.37%	173	2.91%	1,326	22.34%	5,935	-1.35%
Dinuba	Tulare	1,563	57.78%	1,122	41.48%	20	0.74%	441	16.30%	2,705	4.93%
Exeter	Tulare	1,228	66.20%	604	32.56%	23	1.24%	624	33.64%	1,855	12.05%
Farmersville	Tulare	500	43.22%	647	55.92%	10	0.86%	-147	-12.71%	1,157	2.85%
Lindsay	Tulare	946	59.76%	625	39.48%	12	0.76%	321	20.28%	1,583	4.68%
Porterville	Tulare	3,825	62.75%	2,197	36.04%	74	1.21%	1,628	26.71%	6,096	9.74%
Tulare	Tulare	3,884	54.07%	3,252	45.27%	47	0.65%	632	8.80%	7,183	9.89%
Visalia	Tulare	13,854	67.55%	6,492	31.65%	163	0.79%	7,362	35.90%	20,509	2.33%
Woodlake	Tulare	438	51.23%	408	47.72%	9	1.05%	30	3.51%	855	-3.78%
Unincorporated Area	Tulare	19,398	64.39%	10,353	34.37%	375	1.24%	9,045	30.02%	30,126	7.76%
Unapportioned Absentees	Tulare	5,430	68.96%	2,365	30.04%	79	1.00%	3,065	38.93%	7,874	1.53%
Sonora	Tuolumne	779	51.49%	706	46.66%	28	1.85%	73	4.82%	1,513	-9.17%
Unincorporated Area	Tuolumne	9,706	58.69%	6,577	39.77%	255	1.54%	3,129	18.92%	16,538	-2.14%
Camarillo	Ventura	14,939	71.01%	5,909	28.09%	190	0.90%	9,030	42.92%	21,038	4.67%
Fillmore	Ventura	2,010	64.99%	1,049	33.92%	34	1.10%	961	31.07%	3,093	12.87%
Moorpark	Ventura	3,345	72.53%	1,197	25.95%	70	1.52%	2,148	46.57%	4,612	N/A
Ojai	Ventura	2,101	60.76%	1,315	38.03%	42	1.21%	786	22.73%	3,458	6.62%
Oxnard	Ventura	19,792	59.39%	13,117	39.36%	416	1.25%	6,675	20.03%	33,325	6.40%
Port Hueneme	Ventura	3,595	65.64%	1,807	32.99%	75	1.37%	1,788	32.65%	5,477	5.76%
Ventura	Ventura	25,073	64.50%	13,330	34.29%	467	1.20%	11,743	30.21%	38,870	6.44%
Santa Paula	Ventura	4,201	59.06%	2,840	39.93%	72	1.01%	1,361	19.13%	7,113	11.79%
Simi Valley	Ventura	23,957	76.62%	6,998	22.38%	311	0.99%	16,959	54.24%	31,266	8.22%
Thousand Oaks	Ventura	31,965	75.05%	10,205	23.96%	421	0.99%	21,760	51.09%	42,591	5.71%
Unincorporated Area	Ventura	20,405	68.89%	8,783	29.65%	431	1.46%	11,622	39.24%	29,619	11.09%
Davis	Yolo	8,097	37.96%	12,948	60.70%	286	1.34%	-4,851	-22.74%	21,331	-4.66%
Winters	Yolo	543	53.82%	459	45.49%	7	0.69%	84	8.33%	1,009	5.89%
Woodland	Yolo	7,185	59.95%	4,661	38.89%	139	1.16%	2,524	21.06%	11,985	4.07%
Unincorporated Area	Yolo	8,504	51.45%	7,811	47.26%	213	1.29%	693	4.19%	16,528	4.93%
Marysville	Yuba	2,208	62.87%	1,261	35.91%	43	1.22%	947	26.96%	3,512	0.98%
Wheatland	Yuba	339	60.32%	205	36.48%	18	3.20%	134	23.84%	562	7.43%
Unincorporated Area	Yuba	6,216	62.93%	3,461	35.04%	201	2.03%	2,755	27.89%	9,878	8.75%
Unapportioned Absentees	Yuba	1,017	70.38%	412	28.51%	16	1.11%	605	41.87%	1,445	11.89%
Totals (Note: Statewide candidate vote percentages and the total vote number differ here because California's Supplement to Statement of Vote does not count write in votes as part of the city totals.)		5,467,009	57.52%	3,922,519	41.27%	115,453	1.21%	1,544,490	16.25%	9,504,981	-0.53%

==== Cities & Unincorporated Areas that flipped from Democratic to Republican ====
- Brentwood (Contra Costa)
- Westmorland (Imperial)
- Arvin (Kern)
- Avenal (Kings)
- Bell Gardens (Los Angeles)
- Hawaiian Gardens (Los Angeles)
- La Puente (Los Angeles)
- Santa Fe Springs (Los Angeles)
- Madera (Madera)
- Los Banos (Merced)
- Gonzales (Monterey)
- Colfax (Placer)
- Lincoln (Placer)
- San Juan Bautista (San Benito)
- Guadalupe (Santa Barbara)
- Newman (Stanislaus)
- Patterson (Stanislaus)
- Riverbank (Stanislaus)
- Tulare (Tulare)
- Unincorporated Area (Yolo)

==== Cities & Unincorporated Areas that flipped from Republican to Democratic ====
- Fresno (Fresno)
- Blue Lake (Humboldt)
- Beverly Hills (Los Angeles)
- Culver City (Los Angeles)
- Santa Monica (Los Angeles)
- Corte Madera (Marin)
- Unincorporated Area (Marin)
- Pacific Grove (Monterey)
- Nevada City (Nevada)
- Colma (San Mateo)
- Menlo Park (San Mateo)
- San Bruno (San Mateo)
- Capitola (Santa Cruz)
- Watsonville (Santa Cruz)
- Unincorporated Area (Santa Cruz)
- Sebastopol (Sonoma)
- Unincorporated Area (Sonoma)

=== By congressional district ===
Reagan won 37 of the 45 congressional districts, including nineteen held by Democrats.

District	Reagan	Mondale	Representative
1st	52.96%	47.04%	Douglas H. Bosco
2nd	64.45%	35.55%	Eugene A. Chappie
3rd	55.32%	44.68%	Bob Matsui
4th	56.80%	43.20%	Vic Fazio
5th	33.74%	66.26%	Sala Burton
6th	42.90%	57.10%	Barbara Boxer
7th	52.47%	47.53%	George Miller
8th	33.92%	66.08%	Ron Dellums
9th	50.30%	49.70%	Pete Stark
10th	51.53%	48.47%	Don Edwards
11th	50.89%	49.11%	Tom Lantos
12th	57.92%	42.08%	Ed Zschau
13th	58.50%	41.50%	Norman Mineta
14th	65.19%	34.81%	Norman D. Shumway
15th	59.20%	40.80%	Tony Coelho
16th	53.12%	46.88%	Leon Panetta
17th	63.97%	36.03%	Chip Pashayan
18th	51.10%	48.90%	Richard Lehman
19th	63.09%	36.91%	Bob Lagomarsino
20th	70.16%	29.82%	Bill Thomas
21st	72.98%	27%	Bobbi Fiedler
22nd	73.28%	26.72%	Carlos Moorhead
23rd	53.30%	46.70%	Anthony Beilenson
24th	44.24%	55.76%	Henry Waxman
25th	39.11%	60.89%	Edward Roybal
26th	54.55%	45.45%	Howard Berman
27th	53.07%	46.93%	Mel Levine
28th	32.05%	67.95%	Julian Dixon
29th	21.99%	78.01%	Augustus Hawkins
30th	55.87%	44.13%	Matthew Martinez
31st	41.01%	58.99%	Mervyn Dymally
32nd	59.09%	40.91%	Glenn Anderson
33rd	70.68%	29.32%	David Dreier
34th	59.56%	40.44%	Ed Torres
35th	72.10%	27.90%	Jerry Lewis
36th	56.32%	43.68%	George Brown
37th	65.78%	34.22%	Al McCandless
38th	70.15%	29.85%	Jerry M. Patterson
38th	70.15%	29.85%	Bob Dornan
39th	77.91%	22.09%	William Dannemeyer
40th	75.83%	24.17%	Robert Badham
41st	64.85%	35.15%	Bill Lowery
42nd	73.10%	26.90%	Dan Lungren
43rd	74.98%	25.02%	Ron Packard
44th	52.70%	47.30%	Jim Bates
45th	71.97%	28.03%	Duncan Hunter

== Works cited ==
- Ranney, Austin, ed. (1985). The American Elections of 1984. Duke University Press. ISBN 0822302306.
