= Honoré Escolle =

French businessman

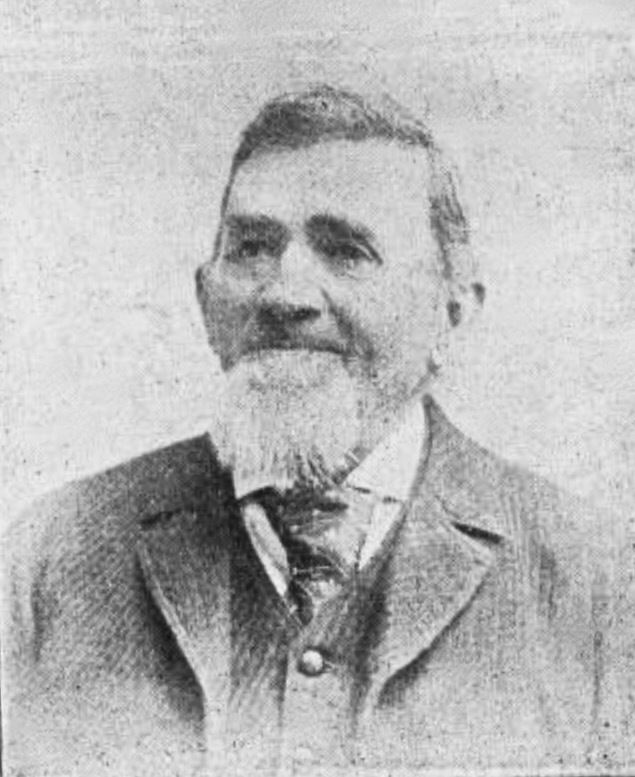
- Honoré Escolle (1832-1895)
- Born: December 24, 1832; Cuers, France
- Died: 18 December 1895 (aged 62); Monterey, California, US
- Occupation: Real estate development
- Spouse: Adelle Elisabeth Duval (m. 1854; died 1912)
- Children: 11

Honoré Escolle (December 24, 1832 – December 18, 1895), was as a French-American businessman from Monterey, California. In 1878, he purchased 1,400 unsettled acres (570 ha) acres of the Sanchez's ranch near Gonzales, California. In the late 1880s, he sold 324 barren acres (131 ha) to Santiago J. Duckworth to build a Catholic Summer resort. This land later became Carmel-by-the-Sea, California

== Early life ==
Escolle was born on December 24, 1832, in Cuers, Var, France. His father was Pons Escolle (b. 1803) and mother was Marie Alexandrine Bernard. In 1847, Escolle left France to come to New Orleans, Louisiana, United States. He stayed in New Orleans for five years before he moved to California.

== Professional background ==
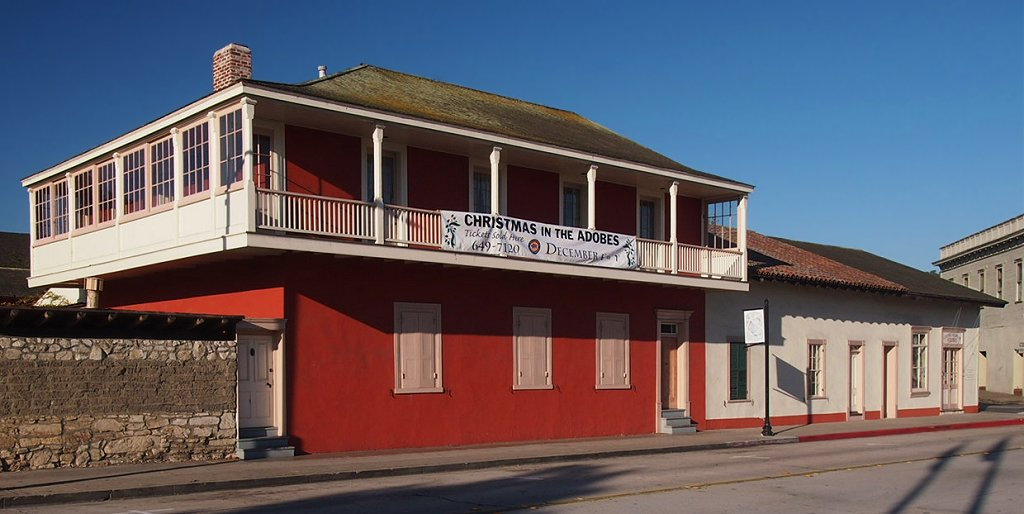
Cooper-Molera Adobe

In 1852, Escolle arrived in Monterey, California. He sold bread to John Bautista Rogers Cooper, who owned what is now the Cooper-Molera Adobe, built in 1823. Escolle's store sold pots, bread, and household goods. His kiln made flowerpots, coffeepots, baking dishes, pitchers, tiles, and jars. He sold his business in 1886 to his son-in-law, A. Manuel.

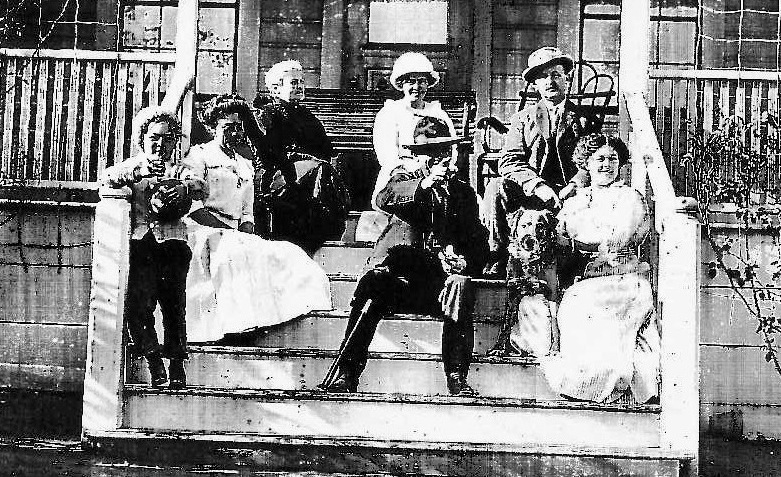
Honoré Escolle's Family.

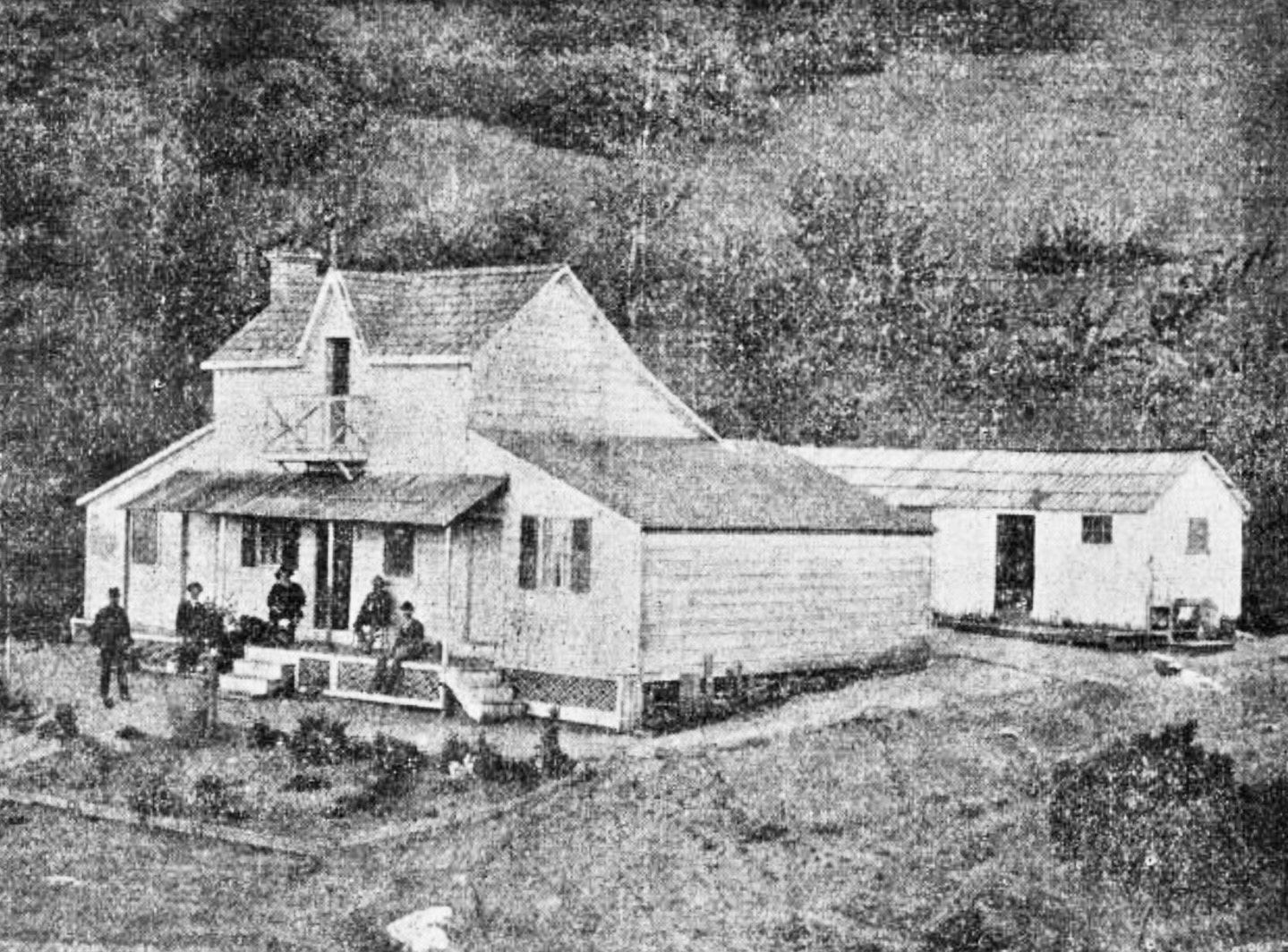
Country home of Honoré Escolle at Rancho Paraje de Sanchez.

Escolle married Adelle Elisabeth Duval (1843-1912), a native of France, in 1854 in San Francisco. They had eleven children.

In 1872, he purchased 1,400 acres (570 ha) of land in Rancho Paraje de Sanchez, near Gonzales, California. He spent a large sum of money to improve it by planting 50 acres (20 ha) in fruit trees. He had a residence on this ranch where he lived with his family.

In early 1888, Santiago J. Duckworth approached Escolle, with plans of subdividing the Las Manzanitas property and building a Catholic Summer resort near the refurbished Carmel Mission as one of the main attractions. Escolle agreed to sell 324 acres (131 ha) of land to Duckworth.

Escolle continued to be involved in real estate transactions in Carmel City after the sale to Duckworth. Beginning on October 12, 1889, Escolle and his wife sold lots in Carmel City at $5 per lot. These real estate transactions continued the next year on May 11, 1890, July 23, 1890, and on September 4, 1890. On September 19, 1890, Escolle sold to S. J. Duckworth all the unsold portion of tract No. 1 in Carmel City for $5.

In 1889, Escolle, who lived in Monterey, bought a 1,400 unsettled acres (570 ha) ranch two miles southwest from Gonzales, which he called the Escolle Ranch. He grew alfalfa, oranges, cherries, and almonds.

== Death ==
Escolle died at his home in Monterey, California, on December 18, 1895, at the age of 62. His funeral took place at the family residence, at Hartnell Street, Monterey. His remains were taken to the San Carlos Catholic Church for the funeral service, after which the Monterey Freemasonry Lodge No. 217, F.& A.M. arranged for his interment at the San Carlos Cemetery in Monterey, California.

== See also ==
- Timeline of Carmel-by-the-Sea, California
