= La Gloria Elementary School =

La Gloria Elementary School may refer to:

- La Gloria Elementary School in Gonzales Unified School District (California)
- La Gloria Elementary School in La Gloria Independent School District (Texas)
