= Community Church of Gonzales =

Historic church in California, United States

- U.S. National Register of Historic Places
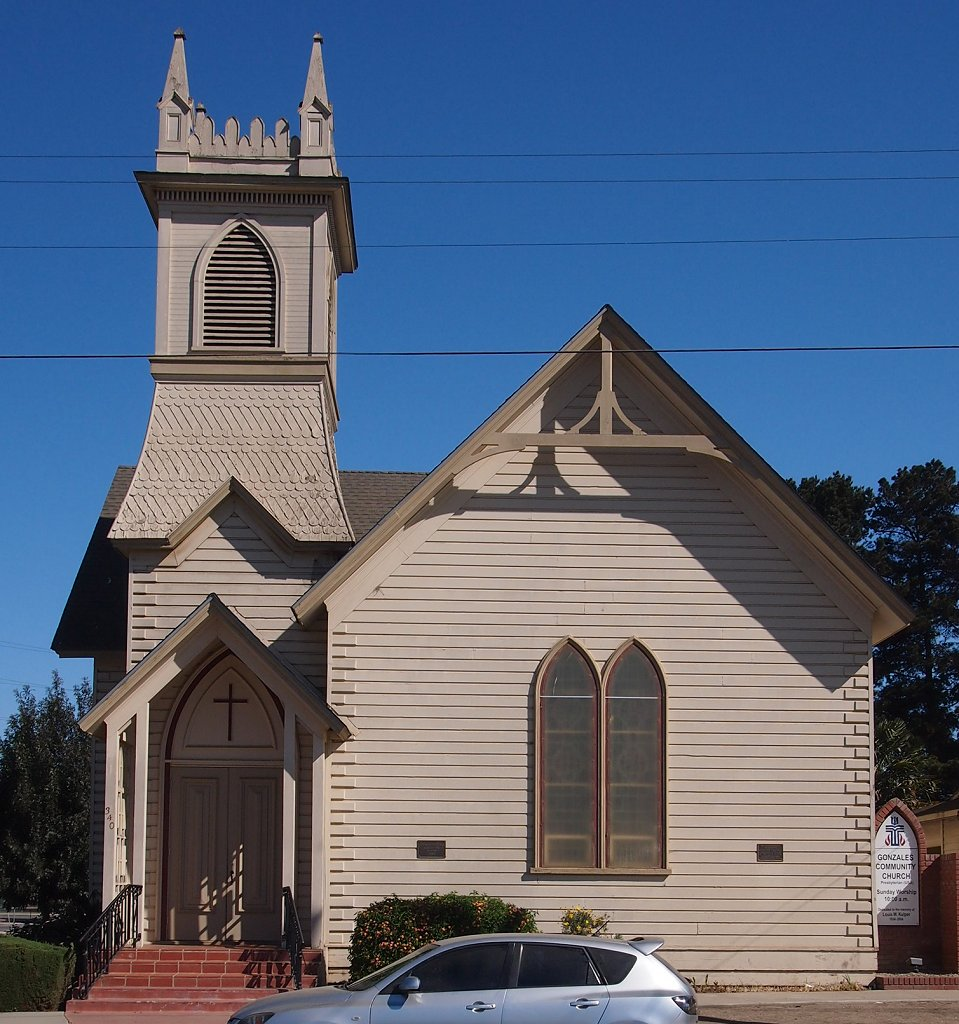
- Community Church of Gonzales from the southwest

- Location within California Location within the United States
- Location: 301 4th St., Gonzales, California
- Coordinates: 36°30′32″N 121°26′26″W
- Area: 0.3 acres (0.12 ha)
- Built: 1883-1884
- Architect: Sommer & Montgomery
- Architectural style: Gothic Revival
- NRHP reference No.: 83001210
- Added to NRHP: September 15, 1983

Community Church of Gonzales is a historic Gothic Revival church building at 301 4th Street in Gonzales, California, United States. It was built 1883–1884 and added to the National Register of Historic Places in 1983. It is one of Monterey County's oldest functioning churches, a prominent Carpenter Gothic church exemplifying a type common to late-19th-century small California towns. It is currently a church of the Presbyterian Church (USA).
