= Ranney Index =

The Ranney Index, developed by political scientist J. Austin Ranney, quantifies the level of competition between the two major political parties within U.S. states. The index assigns a score ranging from 0 to 1, where 0 indicates complete Republican control and 1 signifies complete Democratic control. A score of 0.5 represents perfect bipartisan competition.

== Calculation ==
To calculate the Ranney Index, three key indicators are averaged over a specified period: the percentage of the popular vote each party’s gubernatorial candidates receive, the proportion of seats each party holds in the state legislature, and the percentage of time each party controls both the governorship and a majority in the state legislature. This methodology provides a comprehensive measure of a party’s strength and competitiveness within a state’s political landscape.

== Use ==
The Ranney Index allows political scientists and analysts to evaluate party dominance, analyze political trends, and examine the relationship between party competition and state policy decisions. For example, a higher Ranney Index score suggests stronger Democratic control, while a lower score indicates stronger Republican control. This information is instrumental in understanding how party dominance influences legislative behavior and policy outcomes

== Limitations ==
The index has certain limitations. It focuses solely on state-level offices and may not reflect party competition in federal elections within the same state. Additionally, the index’s accuracy depends on the time period analyzed, as political dynamics can shift rapidly. Moreover, it primarily considers the two major parties, potentially overlooking the impact of third-party movements or independent candidates.
