= Jose Medina =

American politician (born 1953)

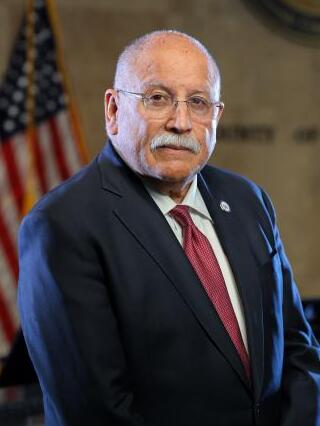
- Official portrait, 2025

Member of the Riverside County Board of Supervisors for the 1st district
- Incumbent
- Assumed office January 7, 2025
- Preceded by: Kevin Jeffries

Member of the California State Assembly from the 61st district
- In office December 3, 2012 – November 30, 2022
- Preceded by: Norma J. Torres
- Succeeded by: Tina McKinnor (redistricted)

Personal details
- Born: March 29, 1953 (age 73) Panama
- Party: Democratic
- Education: University of California, Riverside (BA) (MA)
- Profession: Teacher

Jose Medina (born March 29, 1953) is an American educator and politician who served in the California State Assembly. He is a Democrat who represented the 61st Assembly District, which encompassed parts of northwestern Riverside County and includes the cities of Riverside, Moreno Valley, Perris and Mead Valley.

Medina was the Chair of the Higher Education Committee and a member of the California Latino Legislative Caucus and the California Legislative Jewish Caucus. Prior to being elected to the Assembly in 2012, he was a teacher at Riverside Poly High School and a Riverside Community College District Trustee.

In 2018, Jose Medina secured $9.7 million in state funds through a budget allocation in the 2019 State Budget, signed by then California Governor Jerry Brown to support the development of the Cheech Marin Center for Chicano Art, Culture and Industry of the Riverside Art Museum, also known as "The Cheech." The Cheech will reside in the City of Riverside and be a permanent home for Cheech Marin's collection of Chicano art, making it the most prominent collection of its kind in the United States.

== Electoral history ==
=== 2014 California State Assembly ===
California's 61st State Assembly district election, 2014
Primary election
Party	Candidate	Votes	%
Democratic	Jose Medina (incumbent)	13,631	43.8
Republican	Rudy Aranda	12,942	41.6
Democratic	D. Shelly Yarbrough	4,549	14.6
Total votes		31,122	100.0
General election
Democratic	Jose Medina (incumbent)	34,160	58.8
Republican	Rudy Aranda	23,973	41.2
Total votes		58,033	100.0
Democratic hold			

=== 2016 California State Assembly ===
California's 61st State Assembly district election, 2016
Primary election
Party	Candidate	Votes	%
Democratic	Jose Medina (incumbent)	45,888	67.3
Republican	Hector Diaz	22,281	32.7
Total votes		68,169	100.0
General election
Democratic	Jose Medina (incumbent)	90,663	65.9
Republican	Hector Diaz	46,924	34.1
Total votes		137,587	100.0
Democratic hold			

=== 2018 California State Assembly ===
California's 61st State Assembly district election, 2018
Primary election
Party	Candidate	Votes	%
Democratic	Jose Medina (incumbent)	36,442	99.4
Republican	Ali Mazarei (write-in)	212	0.6
Total votes		36,654	100.0
General election
Democratic	Jose Medina (incumbent)	75,327	67.8
Republican	Ali Mazarei	35,821	32.2
Total votes		111,148	100.0
Democratic hold			

=== 2020 California State Assembly ===
2020 California's 61st State Assembly district election
Primary election
Party	Candidate	Votes	%
Democratic	Jose Medina (incumbent)	51,402	66.2%
Republican	Ali Mazarei	26,250	33.8%
Total votes			
