= Rancho Rincon de la Puente del Monte =

Mexican land grant in California

Coordinates: 36.510°N 121.440°W

Rancho Rincon de la Puente del Monte was a 15,219-acre (61.59 km^{2}) Mexican land grant in the Salinas Valley, in present-day Monterey County, California given in 1836 by Governor Nicolás Gutiérrez to Teodoro Gonzalez. The grant extended along the north bank of the Salinas River, across from Francisco Lugo's Rancho Paraje de Sanchez, and encompassed present day Gonzales

== History ==
Teodoro Gonzalez (1806–1882) came to Monterey from Mexico in 1825. He served as alcalde in 1836, and received the seven square league Rancho Rincon de la Puente del Monte grant in 1836. Teodoro Gonzalez married Guadalupe Villarnel (1808 –1886) after her husband Vicente Rico died. Guadalupe Villarnel de Rico was the mother of Francisco Rico grantee of Rancho San Lorenzo.

With the cession of California to the United States following the Mexican-American War, the 1848 Treaty of Guadalupe Hidalgo provided that the land grants would be honored. As required by the Land Act of 1851, a claim for Rancho Rincon de la Puente del Monte was filed with the Public Land Commission in 1852, and the grant was patented to Teodoro Gonzales in 1866.

Gonzalez sons, Alfredo Gonzalez (1846-1922) and Mariano Gonzalez (1848-1903), founded the town of Gonzales in 1874.

== See also ==
- Ranchos of California
- List of Ranchos of California
