= San Carlos Cemetery (Monterey, California) =

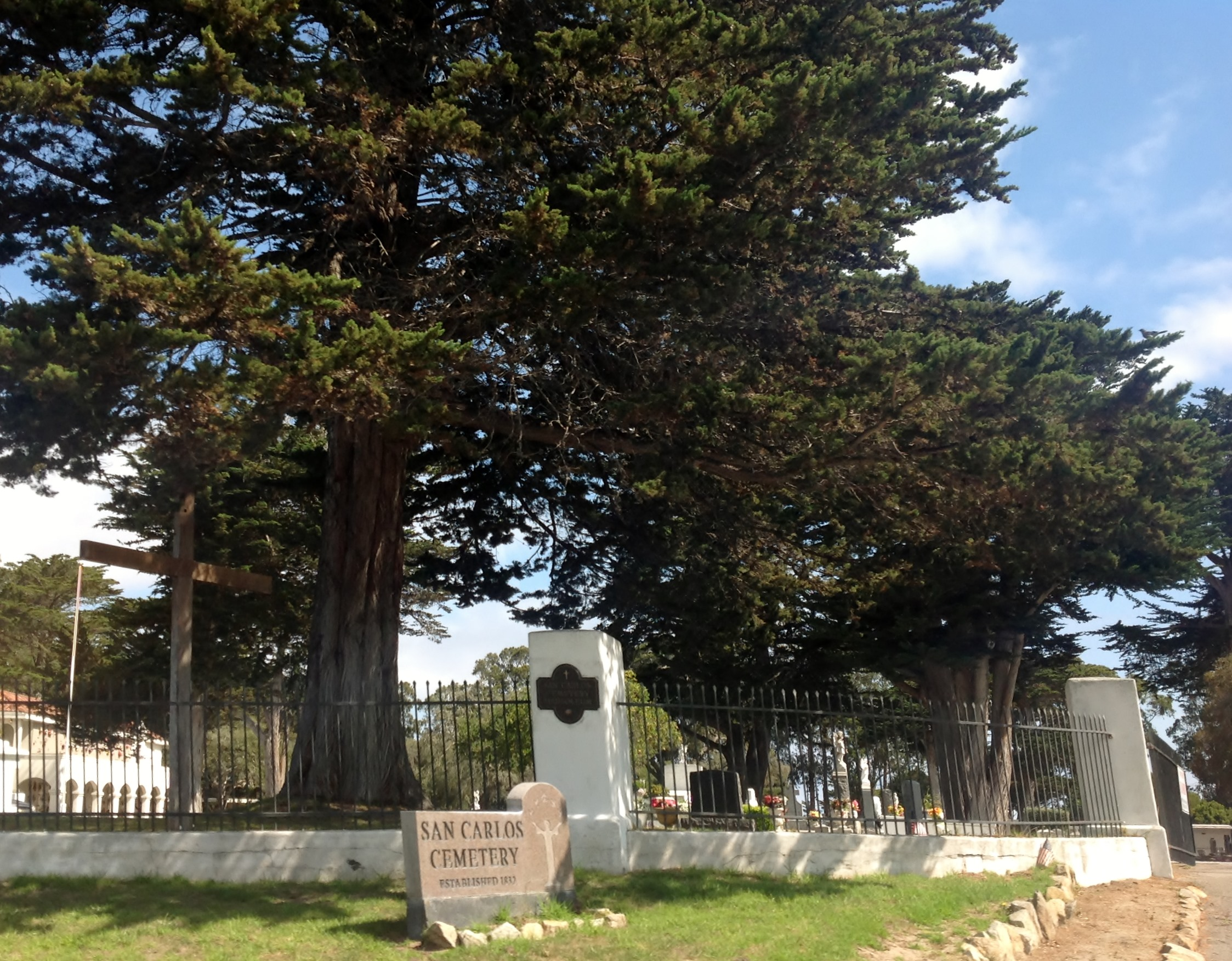
- Interactive map of San Carlos Cemetery

Details
- Established: 1834
- Location: 792 Fremont Street, Monterey, California, U.S.
- Country: United States
- Coordinates: 36.59519°N 121.88715°W
- Type: Catholic
- Size: 13.5 acres (5.5 ha)
- No. of graves: 10,000+
- Find a Grave: San Carlos Cemetery
- The Political Graveyard: San Carlos Cemetery

San Carlos Cemetery, also known as San Carlos Catholic Cemetery, was established as San Carlos Borromeo de Carmelo in 1834, and is located at 792 Fremont Street in Monterey, California. It is a Catholic cemetery. Formerly, it was known as the Monterey Catholic Cemetery, and prior to that, the Campo Santo of the Presidio. It received its solemn blessing on July 31, 1839.

== History ==
Burials started in 1832, two years prior to becoming an official cemetery and there are some unmarked graves. In 1939, the eastern land of the Monterey City Cemetery (or Cementerio El Encinal) was combined to increase the space. The remains of many of the early local families are at San Carlos Cemetery, and it ranges from prominent Hispanic and European settlers, including working-class Sicilians (many worked in the local fishing industry); as well as immigrant families from China, the Philippines, and Japan.

In 1944, a local named Harry Downie led the town to repair Mission San Carlos Borromeo de Carmelo, and he built two 20-ft tall religious crosses (nicknamed the Portola Crespi crosses) to replace the missing originals. In 1969, marking the 100th anniversary of the Portolá expedition, one of the cross was moved and installed on Del Monte Beach, public land. In 2009, the cross was vandalized and the ACLU threatened a lawsuit; as a result the cross was moved to San Carlos Cemetery.

== Notable interments ==
- Ed Burns (1887–1942), professional baseball player
- Honoré Escolle (1832–1895), French businessman, and landowner in Monterey County
- Al Espinosa (1891–1957), professional golfer
- Charles O. Goold (1871–1931), pioneer businessman, banker, landholder, and civic leader
- Dorothy Kingsley (1909–1997), screenplay writer, who worked in film, radio and television.
- Elsie Whitaker Martinez (1890–1984), an artists muse
- Louis S. Slevin (1878–1945), photographer
- Charles Warren Stoddard (1843–1909), author and editor

== See also ==
- List of cemeteries in California
