= Rancho Paraje de Sanchez =

19th century land grant in the Salinas Valley

- Mexican land grant
- Location in California Rancho Paraje de Sanchez (the United States)
- Coordinates: 36°28′12″N 121°27′36″W
- Country: United States
- State: California
- County: Monterey County, USA
- Established: 1839

Rancho Paraje de Sanchez (also called "Rancho Punta del Monte") was a 6,584-acre (26.64 km^{2}) Mexican land grant in the Salinas Valley, in present day Monterey County, California. It was given in 1839 by Governor Juan B. Alvarado to Francisco Lugo.

The grant extended between the Sierra de Salinas (mountains) and the south bank of the Salinas River, across from the Rancho Rincon de la Puente del Monte of Teodoro Gonzalez.

== History ==
Francisco Lugo was granted the one and one half square league Rancho Paraje de Sanchez in 1839.

With the cession of California to the United States following the Mexican-American War, the 1848 Treaty of Guadalupe Hidalgo provided that the land grants would be honored. As required by the Land Act of 1851, a claim for Rancho Paraje de Sanchez was filed with the Public Land Commission in 1853, and the grant was patented to Juana Briones de Lugo et al. in 1866.

Francisco Soberanes, who inherited Rancho Ex-Mission Soledad, later purchased the adjoining Rancho Paraje de Sanchez.

In 1872, Honoré Escolle purchased 1,400 acres (570 ha) of land in Rancho Paraje de Sanchez. He spent a large sum of money to improve it by planting 50 acres (20 ha) in fruit trees. He had a residence on this ranch where he lived with his family.

== See also ==
- Ranchos of California
- List of Ranchos of California
