= J. Austin Ranney =

American political scientist (1920–2006)

- Born: March 29, 1920; Cortland, New York, U.S.
- Died: July 24, 2006 (aged 86); Berkeley, California, U.S.
- Occupation: Political scientist

Academic background
- Education: Northwestern University (BA 1941); University of Oregon (MA 1943); Yale University (PhD 1948)
- Thesis: The Doctrine of Responsible Party Government (1948)

Academic work
- Discipline: Political science
- Sub-discipline: Political parties
- Institutions: University of Illinois (1947–1963); University of Wisconsin–Madison (1963–1976); American Enterprise Institute (1975–1985); University of California, Berkeley (1986–1991)
- Notable students: Douglas W. Rae

J. Austin Ranney (March 29, 1920 – July 24, 2006) was an American political scientist known for his expertise on political parties in the United States and in Britain. He taught at the University of Illinois (1947–1963), the University of Wisconsin–Madison (1963–1976), and the University of California, Berkeley (1986–1991). He was president of the American Political Science Association 1974–1975 and a senior scholar in residence of the American Enterprise Institute 1975–1985.

== Early life and education ==
Ranney was born on March 29, 1920, in Cortland, New York. He then moved to California young and grew up in Corona, California, where he became a debate star and earned a debate scholarship.

Ranney earned his B.A. degree at Northwestern University in 1941, his M.A. at the University of Oregon in 1943, and his Ph.D. at Yale University in 1948. His dissertation, "The Doctrine of Responsible Party Government," was later published in 1954. At Northwestern, he was particularly influenced by Angus Campbell. While at Yale and writing his dissertation, he also taught at Wesleyan University and learned from Elmer Eric Schattschneider.

== Academic career ==
Ranney taught at the University of Illinois 1947–1963 and the University of Wisconsin–Madison 1963–1976, then a senior scholar in residence at the American Enterprise Institute 1975–1985, before coming to the University of California, Berkeley in 1986, where he stayed until retiring emeritus in 1991. He headed Berkeley's political science department 1987–1991, performing a major hiring campaign and reviving the department from a slump.

He created the Ranney Index, and is also noted for his work on preselection in British parliamentary elections (Pathways to Parliament, 1965). He was elected a corresponding fellow of the British Academy on the strength of Pathways to Parliament.

Ranney was politically a Democrat, and he was active in politics. He was active in the Hubert Humphrey campaign of 1968. According to political journalist Theodore H. White, it was Ranney who, in a Nov. 18, 1969, hearing designed to reform the delegate selection process of the Democratic Party, "set... in motion" the idea of quota set-asides, though Ranney "consistently ever since...has expressed his abhorrence of quotas." White attributes the quota system eventually adopted by the McGovern–Fraser Commission as "one of the major factors in the wrecking" of the campaign of George McGovern as the 1972 Democratic presidential candidate and the landslide re-election of Richard Nixon.

He served as president of the American Political Science Association in 1974–1975, and also served as managing editor of the American Political Science Review. He was a Guggenheim fellow (1974). While he was a resident scholar at the American Enterprise Institute 1975–1985, he edited its journal Public Opinion.

Ranney was a longtime affiliate of political science honors society Pi Sigma Alpha. He was president of the society from 1976 to 1978, and also served on the executive council for the ten years prior. He was inducted into Pi Sigma Alpha as a college student. He was awarded Yale's Wilbur Cross Medal and was a fellow of the Center for Advanced Study in the Behavioral Sciences. He was awarded honorary doctorates from Northwestern University, Yale University, and the State University of New York at Cortland.

His influences included Elmer Eric Schattschneider and Angus Campbell, while his Ph.D. students include Douglas W. Rae.

== Death ==
Ranney died on July 24, 2006, at his home in Berkeley, California.

== Selected publications ==
- With Howard Penniman: Democracy in the Islands: The Micronesian Plebiscites of 1983. AEI Press, 1985.
- Pathways to Parliament. Candidate Selection in Britain, Macmillan, London, 1965.
