= Santiago J. Duckworth =

American builder

Santiago Duckworth
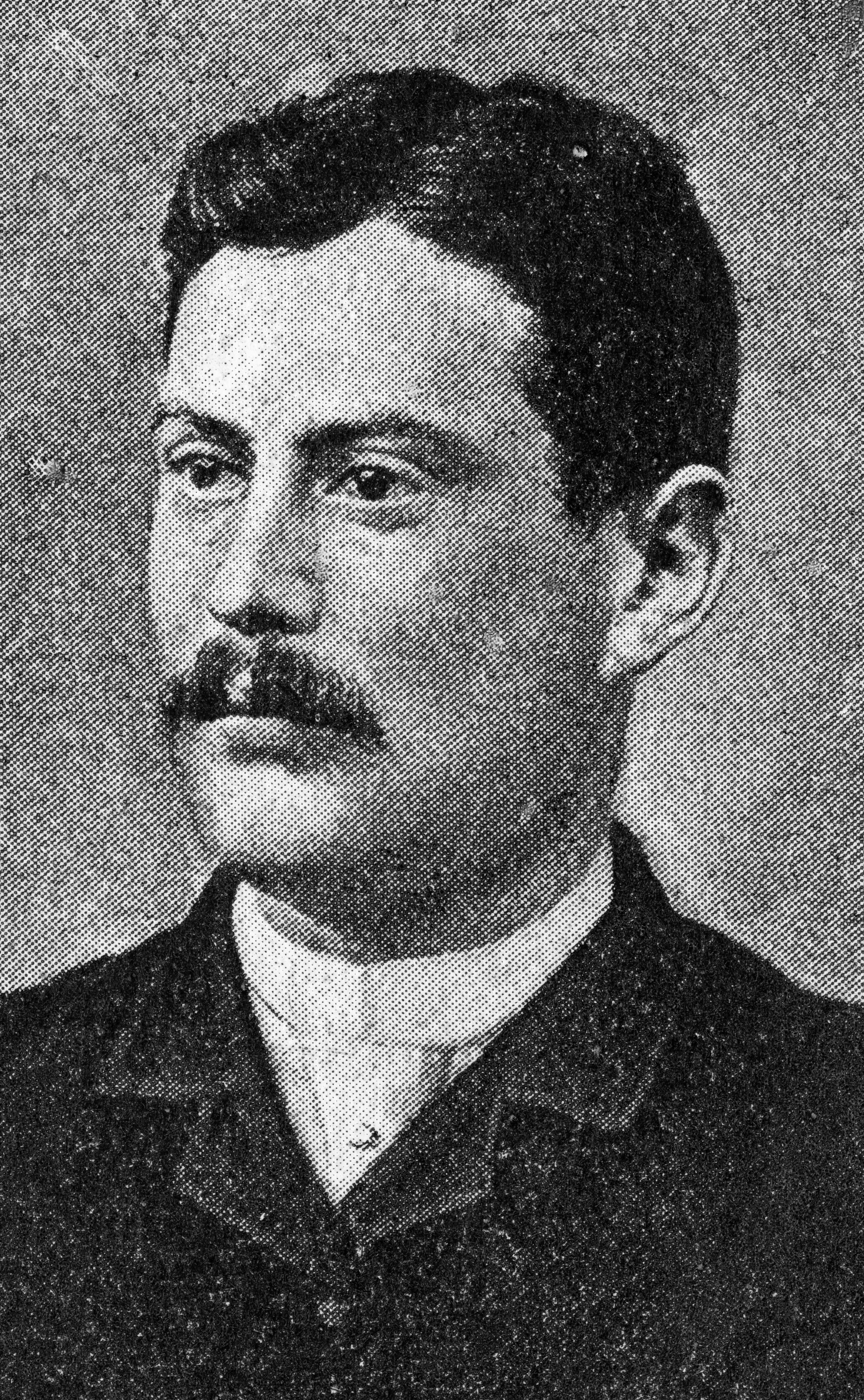
- Santiago J. Duckworth (1862–1930)

Member of the California State Assembly from the 61st district
- In office January 2, 1893 – January 7, 1895
- Preceded by: Alexander Brown
- Succeeded by: William George Hudson

Personal details
- Born: Santiago Jacob Duckworth; June 13, 1865 Monterey, California, US
- Died: 28 June 1930 (aged 68) Tucson, Arizona, US
- Spouses: Flora McKinlay (m. 1896; died 1903) Eloisa Maria Pinto (m. 1909)
- Children: 2
- Occupation: Real estate development

Santiago Jacob Duckworth (June 13, 1865 – June 28, 1930), also known as S. J. Duckworth, was a Californio politician, real estate developer. He served in the California State Assembly for the 61st district from 1893 to 1895. In 1889, he wanted to build a Catholic summer resort, bought the rights to develop the area, filed a subdivision map, and started selling lots, which eventually became Carmel-by-the-Sea.

== Early life ==
Duckworth was born on June 13, 1865, in Monterey, California. His Californio mother, Josefa Romero, was the daughter of José Figueroa the Mexican Governor of Alta California from 1833 to 1835. His father was Lorenzo Santiago Duckworth (1831–1871). Lorenzo's mother was Antonia Armenta, whose father, José María Armenta, held the land grant to Rancho Point Pinos. He lost his father at the age of six. With his two older brothers, they were sent to Watsonville Orphan Asylum in Watsonville, California where they were educated by Fransican Fathers. At the age of eleven Duckworth he left to support his widowed mother.

On November 29, 1892, Duckworth married his first wife, widow Flora Manuel (1852–1903), daughter of Carmen Amesti McKinley (1824–1901) and James McKinley, at the St. Mary's Catholic Cathedral in San Francisco. Carmen Amesti was the daughter of Jose Amesti, who owned Rancho Los Corralitos a Mexican Land Grant. She died at a hospital in Watsonville, California, at 45 years of age, on October 19, 1903. He married Eloisa Maria Pinto on June 23, 1908, at the home of the bride's parents in Watsonville.

== Professional background ==
=== Politician ===
In July 1890, he made an unsuccessful run for the Republican Party's nomination to the California State Assembly from Monterey County. and was nominated by Judge R. B. Carpenter for Monterey and was elected as a

In April 1890, Duckworth accepted the position as Deputy City Clerk of Monterey, which he held until 1892. In the fall of 1892 he was elected to the California State Assembly as a member of the California State Assembly for the California's 61st State Assembly district from January 2, 1893, to January 7, 1895. He ran on the Republican ticket and was a Republican for most of his life.

On March 19, 1898, Duckworth was appointed deputy collector of customs under Harry Chenoweth at Nogales, Arizona.

=== Carmel City ===
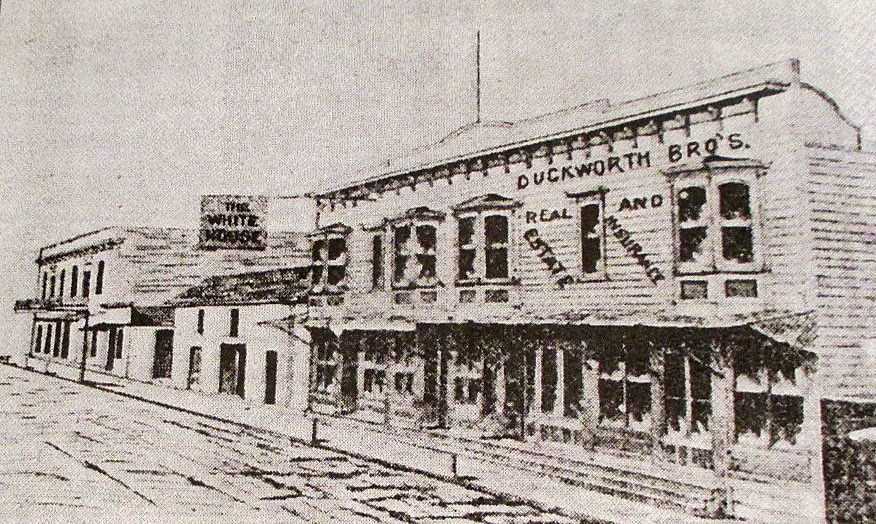
Duckworth Brothers (1887).

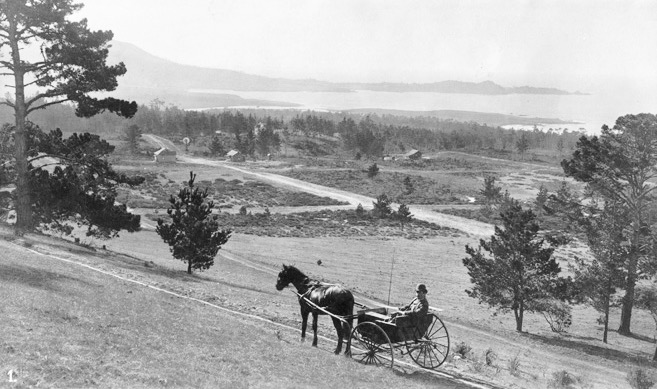
S. J. Duckworth pauses to look upon what he hopes will become a booming “Carmel City", ca. 1890.

In 1887, he and his brother, Belisario Duckworth, set up a real estate and insurance company, named Duckworth Brothers on Alvarado Street in Monterey.

On February 18, 1888, Escolle signed an agreement to sell 324 acres (131 ha) to Duckworth and his brother with the intention of dividing it into town lots. The land began at the top of the Carmel Hill and ran past Hatton Ranch, down through Ocean Avenue to Junipero Avenue.

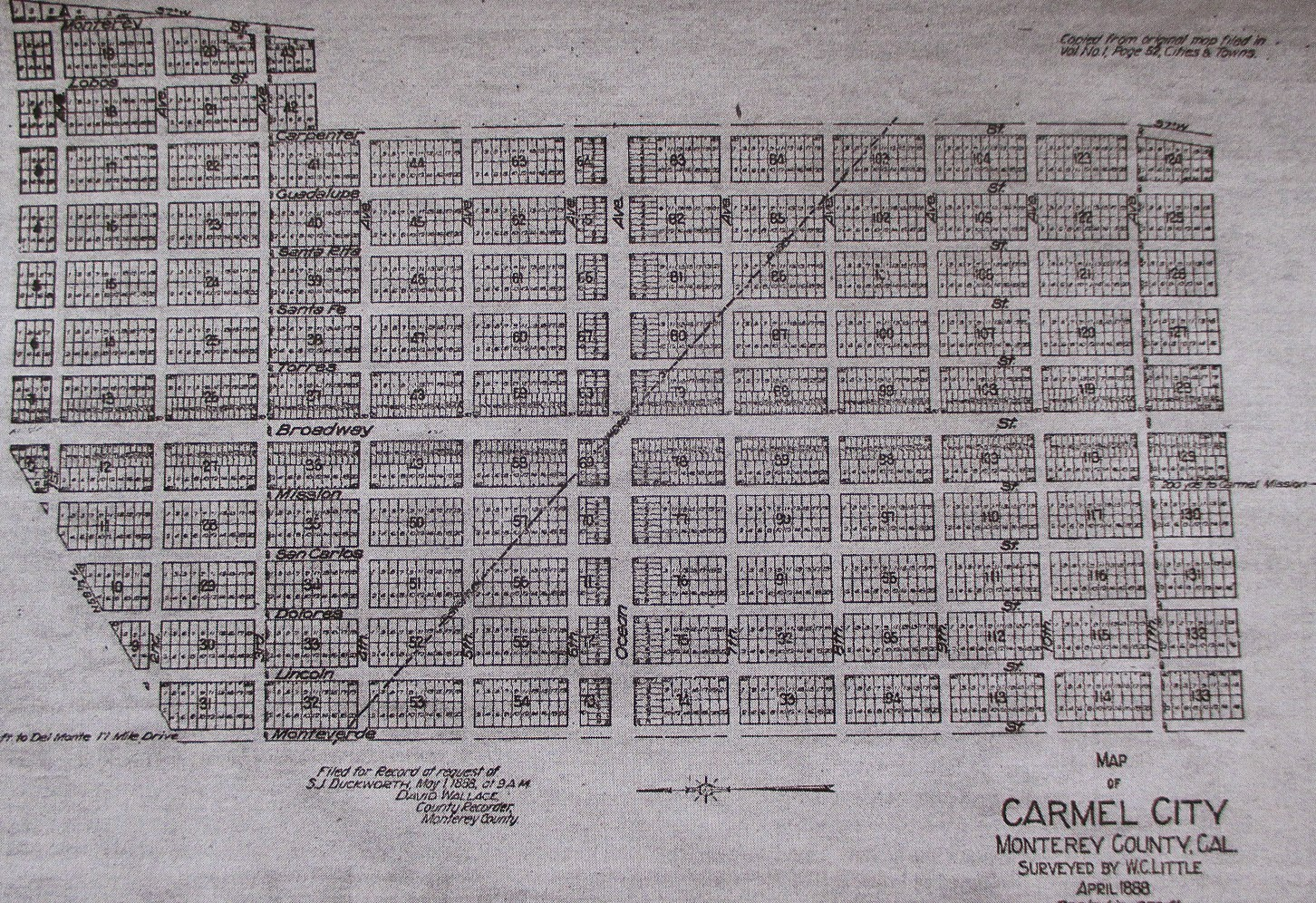
Carmel City Map by W. C. Little (1888).

In March 1888, Duckworth authorized W. C. Little, of Monterey, to survey the Carmel property and write down a subdivision map of the townsite with 135 blocks divided into four tracks. On May 1, 1888, the map was registered with the County Recorder of Monterey County. Corner lots were twenty-five dollars and inside lots twenty dollars and business lots solf for fifty dollars. In July 1888, the sale of lots began.

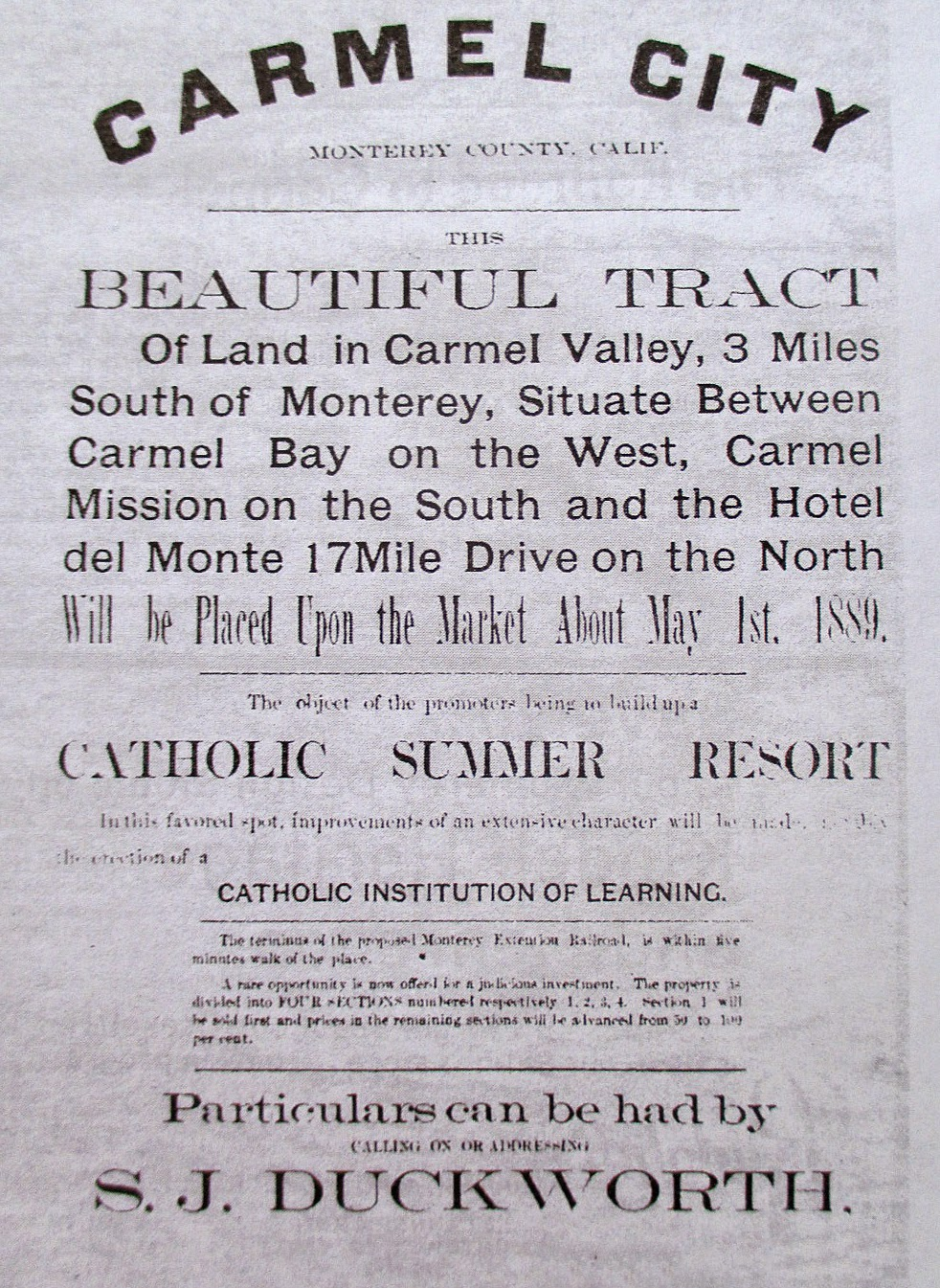
Carmel City Catholic Summer Resort advertisement.

In 1889, Chinese workers began make the ground level at the end of the railway line. In April 1889, Duckworth placed an announcement in the local newspapers for the sale of Carmel lots, highlighting the advantages of the lots, access to the Southern Pacific railroad.

In 1903, Duckworth moved from Monterey County to Watsonville and had a 178 acres (72 ha) ranch near Pinto Lake in the Pajaro valley, about three miles northeast of Watsonville. He kept the reach until March 1915, when it was foreclosed for half its value. In August 1915, he was elected secretary of the Watsonville Chamber of Commerce.

Duckworth returned to Arizona in early 1930 to manage the campaign of Senator Andrew Jackson Bettwy for the Democratic nomination for governor of Arizona. He was also an editor of the Arizona Democrat, a political paper.

== Death ==
Duckworth died of typhoid fever in Tucson Arizona on June 28, 1930, at the age of 68, at the St. Mary's hospital.

== See also ==
- California's 61st State Assembly district
- Timeline of Carmel-by-the-Sea, California
