= Gonzales, California =

City in California, United States

- City
- City of Gonzales
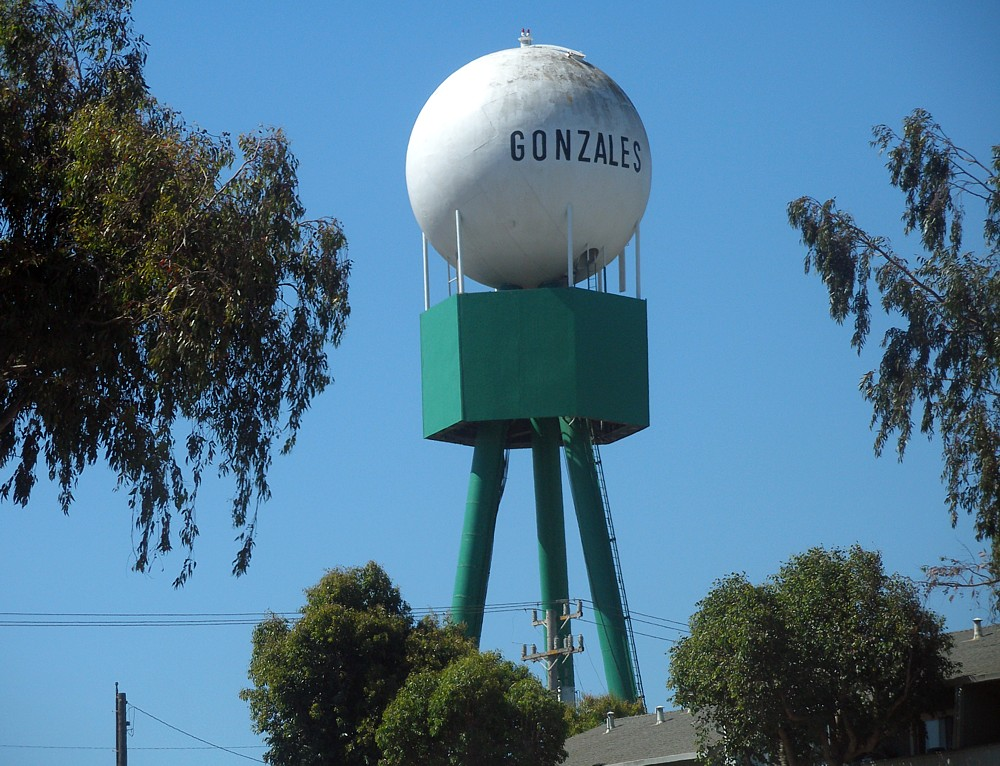
- Gonzales water tower
- Interactive map of Gonzales, California
- Location within California Location within the United States
- Coordinates: 36°30′24″N 121°26′40″W
- Country: United States
- State: California
- County: Monterey
- Incorporated: January 14, 1947

Government
  - State senator: John Laird (D)
  - Assemblymember: Robert Rivas (D)
  - U. S. rep.: Zoe Lofgren (D)

Area
  - Total: 1.95 sq mi (5.1 km^{2})
  - Land: 1.91 sq mi (4.9 km^{2})
  - Water: 0.04 sq mi (0.10 km^{2}) 1.95%
- Elevation: 135 ft (41 m)

Population (2020)
  - Total: 8,647
  - Density: 4,527.2/sq mi (1,748.0/km^{2})
- Time zone: UTC-08:00 (PST)
  - Summer (DST): UTC-07:00 (PDT)
- ZIP code: 93926
- Area code: 831
- FIPS code: 06-30392
- GNIS feature ID: 1659726
- Website: www.gonzalesca.gov

Gonzales is a city in Monterey County, California, United States. Gonzales is located 16 miles (26 km) southeast of Salinas, at an elevation of 135 feet (41 m). The population was 8,647 at the 2020 census, up from 8,187 at the 2010 census. Gonzales is a member of the Association of Monterey Bay Area Governments. Gonzales won the Culture of Health Prize from the Robert Wood Johnson Foundation in 2019.

== History ==
Gonzales was founded by Dr. Mariano Gonzalez and his brother Alfredo Gonzales on land that was originally Rancho Rincon de la Puente del Monte. The rancho was given to their father, Teodoro Gonzalez, in 1836 while he was serving as alcalde of Monterey.

The brothers laid out the 50-block town on approximately 15,000 acres (6,100 ha) in 1874 in a grid of northeast to southwest and northwest to southeast streets. In 1872, they granted a 100 feet (30 m) right-of-way through town to Southern Pacific Railroad, which subsequently built a depot for freight and passengers. The dominant commerce at the time was grain raising and cattle ranching. The Gonzalez brothers are also credited with constructing one of the first irrigation systems in the Salinas Valley. They built a dam and head gate on the nearby Salinas River and miles of canals throughout the area.

In the early 1900s, Gonzales became a predominantly Swiss dairy community when John B. Meyenberg brought his original milk processing procedures to the region. His Alpine Milk Company, later known as the Meyenberg Milk Products Company, opened its first plant in Gonzales in 1906. At one time, there were 7,000 cows within five miles of town being milked.

Prior to being nicknamed the "Wine Capital of Monterey County", Gonzales was known as "The Heart of the Salad Bowl" (due to its central location in the agricultural valley). Before that it was nicknamed "Little Switzerland" (due to the similarities of the valley landscape to Switzerland as well as the predominantly Swiss community at the time).

Dairy farming gave way to orchards and row crops in the 1920s and prospered due to the rich soil and advancements in irrigation, machinery and transportation facilities. These improvements to agriculture technology turned the Salinas Valley into the nation's premier agricultural center. Today, there is only one dairy farm left near town.

The first school house was built in 1874. The first church, the Gonzales Baptist Church, was built in 1884 and still holds weekly worship services today.

St. Theodore Catholic Church, named for Teodoro Gonzales, was built in 1883.

The town was officially incorporated January 10, 1947.

== Geography ==
Gonzales is located in northern Monterey County at 36°30′24″N 121°26′40″W, in the Salinas Valley. U.S. Route 101 passes through the northeastern side of the city, with access from three exits. US 101 leads northwest 17 miles (27 km) to Salinas, the county seat, and southeast 8 miles (13 km) to Soledad.

According to the United States Census Bureau, Gonzales has a total area of 1.95 square miles (5.1 km^{2}), of which 0.04 square miles (0.10 km^{2}), or 1.95%, are water.

== Demographics ==
Historical population
Census	Pop.	Note	%±
1880	233		—
1890	359		54.1%
1950	1,821		—
1960	2,138		17.4%
1970	2,575		20.4%
1980	2,891		12.3%
1990	4,660		61.2%
2000	7,525		61.5%
2010	8,187		8.8%
2020	8,647		5.6%
U.S. Decennial Census

=== 2020 census ===
As of the 2020 census, Gonzales had a population of 8,647 and a population density of 4,520.1 inhabitants per square mile (1,745.2/km^{2}). The age distribution was 30.7% under the age of 18, 12.0% aged 18 to 24, 27.9% aged 25 to 44, 20.8% aged 45 to 64, and 8.6% aged 65 or older. The median age was 29.8 years. For every 100 females, there were 102.5 males, and for every 100 females age 18 and over there were 99.8 males.

The census reported that 99.6% of the population lived in households, 0.4% lived in non-institutionalized group quarters, and no one was institutionalized. In addition, 99.7% of residents lived in urban areas, while 0.3% lived in rural areas.

There were 2,042 households, of which 61.6% had children under the age of 18 living in them. Of all households, 59.4% were married-couple households, 7.1% were cohabiting couple households, 11.7% were households with a male householder and no spouse or partner present, and 21.8% were households with a female householder and no spouse or partner present. About 8.3% of all households were made up of individuals and 3.6% had someone living alone who was 65 years of age or older. The average household size was 4.22. There were 1,796 families (88.0% of all households).

There were 2,088 housing units at an average density of 1,091.5 units per square mile (421.4 units/km^{2}), of which 2,042 (97.8%) were occupied and 2.2% were vacant. Of occupied units, 54.6% were owner-occupied and 45.4% were occupied by renters. The homeowner vacancy rate was 0.5% and the rental vacancy rate was 1.7%.

Racial composition as of the 2020 census
Race	Number	Percent
White	1,392	16.1%
Black or African American	49	0.6%
American Indian and Alaska Native	488	5.6%
Asian	171	2.0%
Native Hawaiian and Other Pacific Islander	12	0.1%
Some other race	4,643	53.7%
Two or more races	1,892	21.9%
Hispanic or Latino (of any race)	7,945	91.9%

=== Demographic estimates ===
In 2023, the US Census Bureau estimated that 30.2% of the population were foreign-born. Of all people aged 5 or older, 30.8% spoke only English at home, 68.7% spoke Spanish, 0.4% spoke other Indo-European languages, and 0.2% spoke Asian or Pacific Islander languages. Of those aged 25 or older, 62.3% were high school graduates and 9.2% had a bachelor's degree.

=== Income and poverty ===
The median household income in 2023 was $76,060, and the per capita income was $25,358. About 6.8% of families and 8.0% of the population were below the poverty line.

=== 2010 census ===
At the 2010 census Gonzales had a population of 8,187. The population density was 4,178.5 inhabitants per square mile (1,613.3/km^{2}). The racial makeup of Gonzales was 3,464 (42.3%) White, 81 (1.0%) African American, 124 (1.5%) Native American, 190 (2.3%) Asian, 14 (0.2%) Pacific Islander, 3,958 (48.3%) from other races, 356 (4.3%) from two or more races and 7,276 (88.9%) Hispanic or Latino of any race.

The census reported that 8,181 people (99.9% of the population) lived in households, 6 (0.1%) lived in non-institutionalized group quarters, and no one was institutionalized.

There were 1,906 households, 1,252 (65.7%) had children under the age of 18 living in them, 1,256 (65.9%) were opposite-sex married couples living together, 309 (16.2%) had a female householder with no husband present, 139 (7.3%) had a male householder with no wife present. There were 120 (6.3%) unmarried opposite-sex partnerships, and 11 (0.6%) same-sex married couples or partnerships. 155 households (8.1%) were one person and 66 (3.5%) had someone living alone who was 65 or older. The average household size was 4.29. There were 1,704 families (89.4% of households); the average family size was 4.45.

The age distribution was 2,856 people (34.9%) under the age of 18, 957 people (11.7%) aged 18 to 24, 2,355 people (28.8%) aged 25 to 44, 1,529 people (18.7%) aged 45 to 64, and 490 people (6.0%) who were 65 or older. The median age was 27.0 years. For every 100 females, there were 104.7 males. For every 100 females age 18 and over, there were 104.4 males.

There were 1,989 housing units at an average density of 1,015.2 per square mile, of the occupied units 1,019 (53.5%) were owner-occupied and 887 (46.5%) were rented. The homeowner vacancy rate was 2.7%; the rental vacancy rate was 2.1%. 4,186 people (51.1% of the population) lived in owner-occupied housing units and 3,995 people (48.8%) lived in rental housing units.

== Media ==
Local radio stations include KHIP-FM - 104.3 and KKMC-AM - 880. Television service for the community comes from the Monterey-Salinas-Santa Cruz designated market area (DMA). Local newspapers include the Salinas Californian, the Monterey County Herald and the Gonzales Tribune, first published in 1890, and at one time the paper with the largest circulation in Monterey County.

== Wine-growing area ==
Gonzales is an important wine cultivation area. Wineries located in Gonzales include Constellation Brands, Robert Talbott, Pisoni Vineyards, Boekenoogen Winery, McIntyre Vineyards, Mer Soleil, and Salinas Valley Vineyards.

== Academics, courses, graduation requirements ==
Gonzales High School offers a variety of courses, including several ROP/CTE fine arts, agriculture, and tech classes. GHS also has several dual-enrollment and honors programs for language arts, mathematics, social sciences, and laboratory sciences. All courses offered to students are CSU/UC approved.

== Water tower ==
The white golf ball-shaped tank of the water tower at Gonzales is supported by three tubular green legs and reaches about 125 ft (38 m) high.

== Climate ==
This region experiences dry summers with very hot days and cool nights, and moderately humid winter with mild to cool days and freezing nights. There is no average monthly temperatures above 71.6 °F. According to the Köppen Climate Classification system, Gonzales has a hot-summer mediterranean climate, abbreviated "Csa" on climate maps. Summer daytime temperatures average around 35 °C (95 °F), but nights are cool to cold year-round.

Climate data for Gonzales
Month	Jan	Feb	Mar	Apr	May	Jun	Jul	Aug	Sep	Oct	Nov	Dec	Year
Record high °F (°C)	86 (30)	86 (30)	93.0 (33.9)	100.0 (37.8)	106.0 (41.1)	111.9 (44.4)	116.1 (46.7)	115.0 (46.1)	114.1 (45.6)	116.1 (46.7)	93.9 (34.4)	90.0 (32.2)	116.1 (46.7)
Mean daily maximum °F (°C)	61 (16)	63.0 (17.2)	66.0 (18.9)	71.8 (22.1)	79.7 (26.5)	88 (31)	95.5 (35.3)	94.8 (34.9)	90.7 (32.6)	81.0 (27.2)	69.4 (20.8)	61.9 (16.6)	76.9 (24.9)
Daily mean °F (°C)	46.8 (8.2)	49.1 (9.5)	51.4 (10.8)	55.2 (12.9)	61.2 (16.2)	67.3 (19.6)	72.9 (22.7)	72.3 (22.4)	69.4 (20.8)	61.9 (16.6)	53.2 (11.8)	47.7 (8.7)	59.0 (15.0)
Mean daily minimum °F (°C)	32.7 (0.4)	35.2 (1.8)	36.7 (2.6)	38.8 (3.8)	43 (6)	46.6 (8.1)	50.4 (10.2)	49.8 (9.9)	48.4 (9.1)	43 (6)	37.0 (2.8)	33.4 (0.8)	41.2 (5.1)
Record low °F (°C)	10.0 (−12.2)	17.1 (−8.3)	18.0 (−7.8)	21.0 (−6.1)	26.1 (−3.3)	28.0 (−2.2)	35.1 (1.7)	30.9 (−0.6)	32.0 (0.0)	25.0 (−3.9)	15.1 (−9.4)	10.0 (−12.2)	10.0 (−12.2)
Average precipitation inches (mm)	3.3 (83)	3.1 (79)	2.9 (73)	1.3 (32)	0.4 (11)	0.1 (2)	0.0 (1)	0.0 (1)	0.2 (5)	0.7 (19)	1.7 (42)	2.8 (72)	16.5 (420)
Average precipitation days	9	9	9	5	2	1	0	0	1	3	6	9	54

== Economy ==
=== Largest employers ===
According to the City of Gonzales, the largest employers in the city are:

#	Employer	# of Employees
1	Taylor Farms	600
2	Gonzales Unified School District	283
3	Church Brothers	200
4	Jackpot Harvesting	187
5	Constellation Brands	100
6	Silva Farms	100
7	Green Valley Farm Supply	75
8	Gonzales Packing Company	66
9	Ramsay Highlander	55

== Notable people ==
- John Blume, the "Father of Earthquake Engineering"; born in Gonzales
- Honoré Escolle, French businessman; purchased a 1,400 unsettled acres (570 ha) ranch two miles southwest of Gonzales

== Schools ==
Gonzales Unified School District:

- La Gloria Elementary (K-5)
- Fairview Middle School (6-8)
- Gonzales High School (9-12)
- Somavia Continuation School

== See also ==
- Coastal California
- List of school districts in Monterey County, California
