= Gonzales Unified School District =

School district in California, United States

Location
- 600 Elko Street; Gonzales, California 93926

District information
- Type: Public
- Superintendent: Joey Adame
- Asst. superintendent(s): Hugo Galvan
- Schools: La Gloria Elementary, Fairview Middle School, Gonzales High School, Gonzales Adult School

Students and staff
- Students: 1,962
- Teachers: 96

Other information
- Website: https://www.gonzalesusd.net/

Gonzales Unified School District is a school district in Gonzales, California. It operates La Gloria Elementary School, Fairview Middle School, Gonzales High School, and Gonzales Adult School.

As of the 2023–2024 school year, Gonzales Unified School District serves approximately 1,962 students. The district employs about 96 full-time equivalent classroom teachers, resulting in a student–teacher ratio of approximately 20:1.

== History ==
The first schoolhouse in Gonzales was built in 1874. The schoolhouse was later rebuilt into the La Gloria Schoolhouse, which still stands, conserved as a museum dedicated to seeing what education was like during the turn of the 19th century.

In 2018 Yvette Irving became the Superintendent. The school board continued her tenure in 2020, with an anticipated end in mid-2022. In March 2022 the school board decided to remove her early before the scheduled end of her term. Three board members did so in favor, and two voted against the removal. The school district paid Irving's remaining scheduled contracted earnings as the district did not specify wrongdoing as a reason for the firing. Irving was succeeded as Superintendent by Matilde Zamora, who held the position until 2024. Since 2024 Joey Adame has been the superintendent of the school district.
