= Socialist Party of California =

- Chairman: Mimi Soltysik; Lynn Lomibao
- Founded: January 1, 1902 (SPA affiliate); January 1, 1973 (SPUSA affiliate); June 30, 2011 (re-chartered)
- Dissolved: 2020
- Ideology: Democratic socialism Socialist feminism
- Political position: Left-wing
- National affiliation: Socialist Party USA
- Colors: Red

The Socialist Party of California (SPCA) was a socialist political party in the U.S. state of California. Founded in the early 1900s, it had been the state chapter of the Socialist Party USA since being re-chartered in 2011. As of July 2020, it was no longer listed as active by the national organization.

== Socialist Party of America affiliation ==
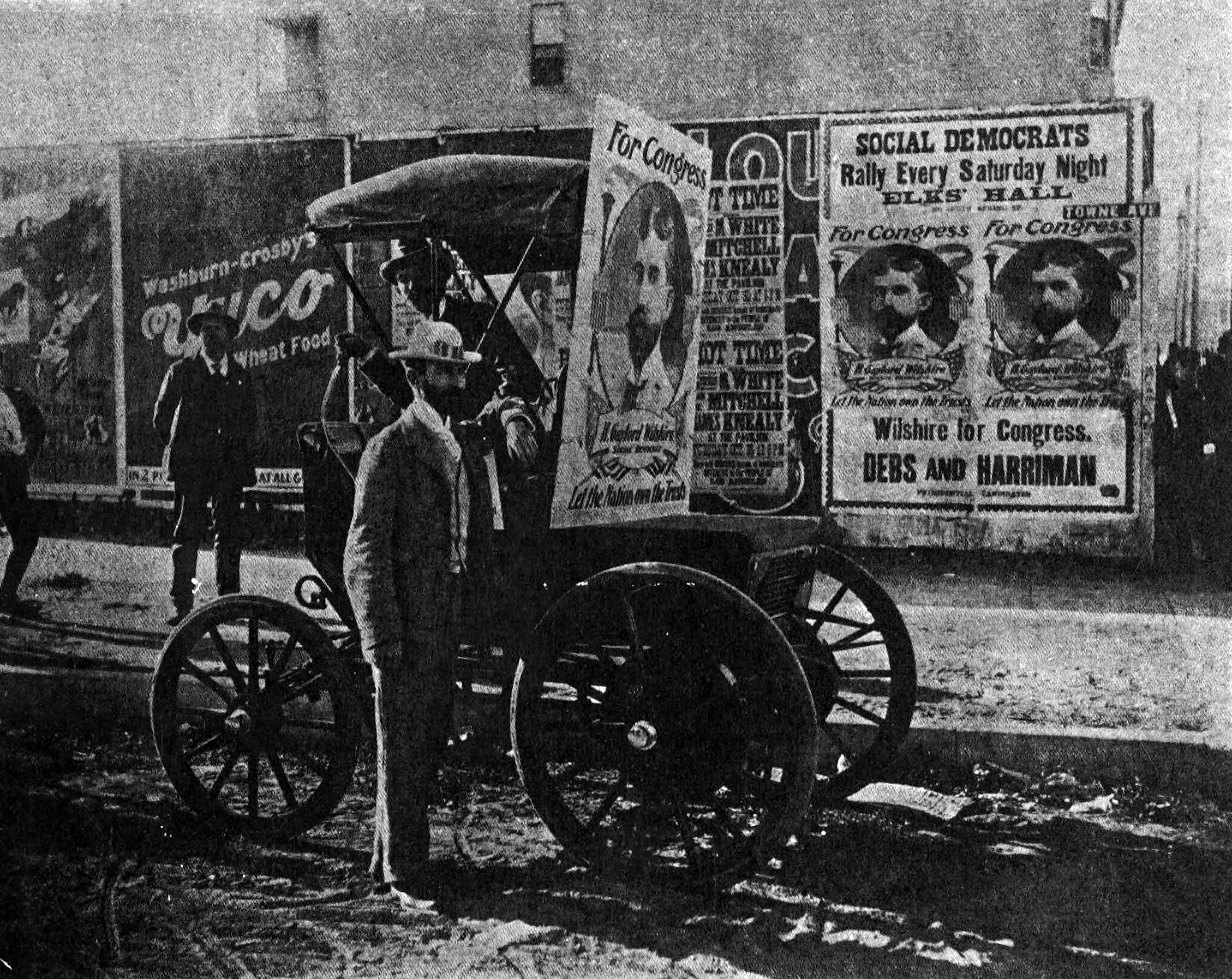
Gaylord Wilshire, Los Angeles publisher, during his 1900 congressional campaign on the Social Democratic ticket

The Socialist Party of California was affiliated with the Socialist Party of America for most of the twentieth century. Author Upton Sinclair, a multi-time candidate for office, switched to the Democratic Party in 1934 and ran for governor of California under the End Poverty In California platform, drawing most of the SPC's members away from the party.

In 1972, the Socialist Party of America changed its name to "Social Democrats, USA" by a vote of 73 to 34 at its December National Convention. Renaming the Party as SDUSA was meant to be "realistic" as the Party had not run a presidential candidate since the 1956 elections.

== Socialist Party USA affiliation ==
The following year, 1973, the Socialist Party USA was formed out the core members of the Debs Caucus. The Socialist Party of California was ultimately reorganized under the Socialist Party USA banner. The chapter's membership increased during the presidential election of 2008 under the Vice Presidential nominee and 2012 Presidential nominee Stewart Alexander. In June 2011, the Party was re-charted under State Chair Mimi Soltysik. The Party hosted the October 2011 Socialist Party National Convention, which was held in Los Angeles. The Socialist Party of California operated with locals in the counties of Los Angeles, Ventura, and the San Francisco Bay Area.

As of July 2020, the SPCA is removed from the SPUSA register of active state parties and the website is inactive.

== Notable members ==
=== SPA affiliate ===
==== Public officials ====
- Ralph Luther Criswell, member of the Los Angeles City Council
- George W. Downing, one of three Socialists elected to the California State Assembly in 1914
- Elijah Falk, Mayor of Eureka
- Wilbur F. Gilbert, California State Assemblyman (elected as a Democrat)
- Witten William Harris, one of three Socialists elected to the California State Assembly in 1914
- George G. Kidwell, director of the California Department of Industrial Relations
- Charles W. Kingsley, first Socialist elected to the California State Assembly
- Estelle Lawton Lindsey, member of the Los Angeles City Council
- Kate Richards O'Hare, assistant director of the California Department of Penology
- John C. Packard, chairman of the California Industrial Welfare Commission
- Paul A. Richie, California State Assemblyman (elected as a Democrat)
- B. C. Ross, Mayor of Daly City
- Lewis A. Spengler, one of three Socialists elected to the California State Assembly in 1914
- William Thum, Mayor of Pasadena
- Ernest O. Voigt, California State Assemblyman (elected as a Democrat)
- Jerry Voorhis, U.S. Representative (elected as a Democrat)
- Fred C. Wheeler, member of the Los Angeles City Council
- Thomas W. Williams, member of the Los Angeles City Council and State Secretary of the Socialist Party of California
- J. Stitt Wilson, Mayor of Berkeley
- Stanley B. Wilson, member of the California State Board of Education and editor of the Western Comrade

==== Other members ====
- Hans Amlie, commander of the Lincoln Battalion during the Spanish Civil War
- Warren Billings, labor leader and activist convicted for the 1916 Preparedness Day bombing
- Bill Busick, state chairman and labor leader
- Carl Browne, former leader in the Workingmen's Party of California and Coxey's Army
- Herbert Stanley Calvert, labor leader
- Thomas Church, landscape architect
- Travers Clement, writer
- Hugo Ernst, labor leader
- Jacob Golos, party organizer
- Raymond Griffith, actor
- E. Haldeman-Julius, publisher
- Gilbert Van Tassel Hamilton, physician
- Job Harriman, 1900 Vice Presidential candidate of the Social Democratic Party of America, forerunner of the SPA
- Helen Hoyt, poet
- George Ross Kirkpatrick, Executive Secretary of the SPA and multi-time candidate for office
- Lena Morrow Lewis, activist and candidate for Lieutenant Governor in 1926
- Jack London, author
- Robert Martinson, sociologist and Socialist candidate for mayor of Berkeley
- Mila Tupper Maynard, Unitarian minister
- Walter Thomas Mills, candidate for U.S. Senator in 1916
- Broadus Mitchell, academic
- Thomas Mooney, labor leader and activist convicted for the 1916 Preparedness Day bombing
- Walter George Muelder, academic
- Upton Sinclair, journalist, writer, and multi-time candidate for office
- James Robert Townsend, patent attorney
- Luella Twining, labor organizer and candidate for Congress in 1916 and 1918
- Ernest Untermann, author and candidate for U.S. Senator in 1914
- Rob Wagner, publisher
- Anita Whitney, defendant in Whitney v. California
- Gaylord Wilshire, land developer and multi-time candidate for office
- George W. Woodbey, minister and sole black delegate to the 1904 and 1908 SPA conventions

=== SPUSA affiliate ===
- Stewart Alexander, 2012 nominee for President by Socialist Party USA
- Mimi Soltysik, 2016 nominee for President by Socialist Party USA

== See also ==
- Stephen Maybell
- Charles J. Beerstecher
- California socialists
- Communists from California
- Members of the Democratic Socialists of America from California

== Bibliography ==
- Shaffer, Ralph E. "A History of the Socialist Party of California", University of California Berkeley, 1955
