= End Poverty in California =

Great Depression–era political platform

Logo of End Poverty in California's official newspaper

End Poverty in California (EPIC) was a political campaign started in 1934 by socialist writer Upton Sinclair (best known as author of The Jungle). The movement formed the basis for Sinclair's campaign for governor of California in 1934. The plan called for a massive public works program, sweeping tax reform, and guaranteed pensions. It gained major popular support, with thousands joining End Poverty Leagues across the state. EPIC never came to fruition due to Sinclair's defeat in the 1934 election, but is seen as an influence on New Deal programs enacted by President Franklin D. Roosevelt.

== Plan ==
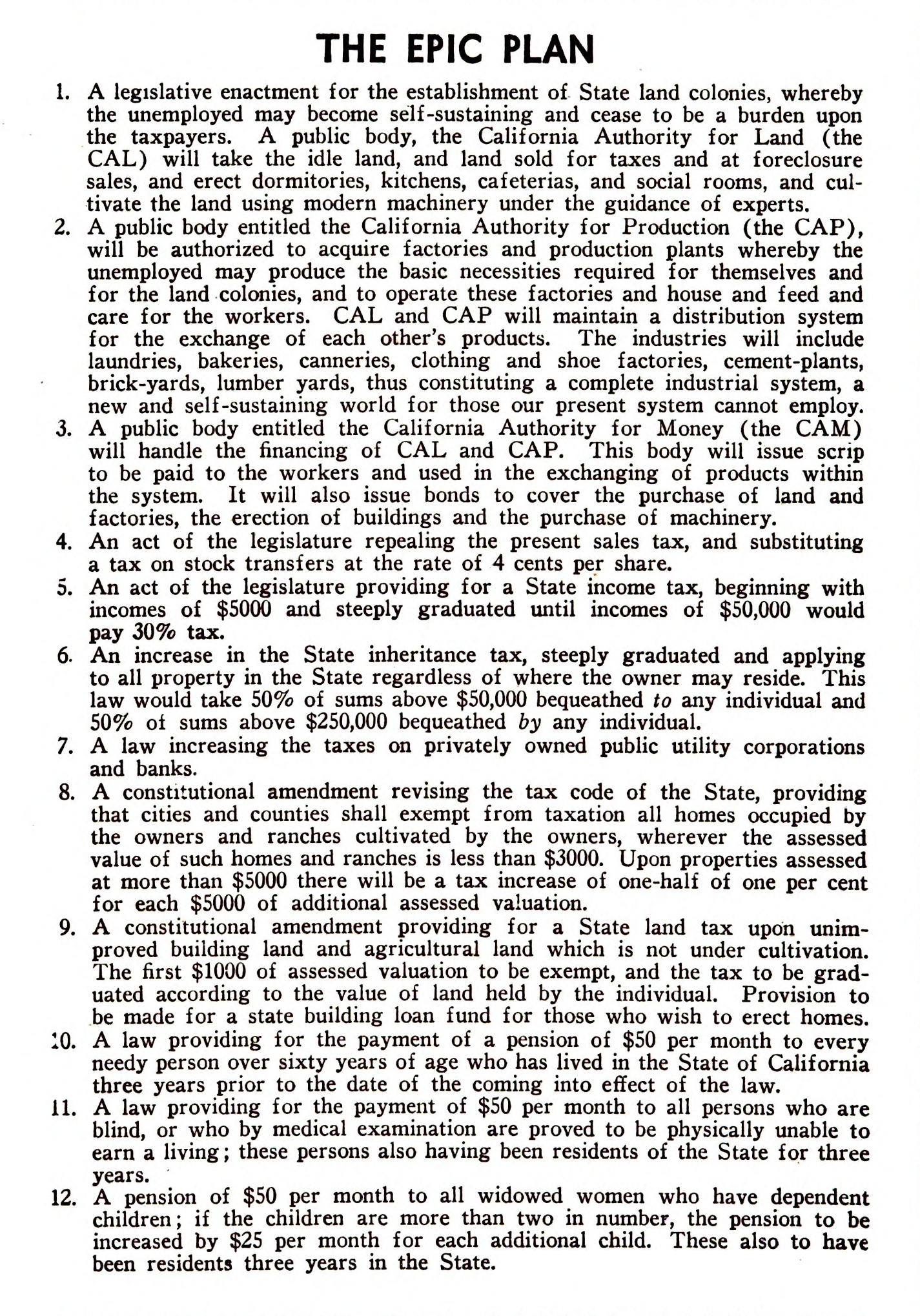
The EPIC Plan, published in The Lie Factory Starts, 1934

Sinclair laid out his vision for EPIC in his 1933 book I, Governor of California, and How I Ended Poverty: A True Story of the Future. Specifically, the plan called for state seizure of idle factories and farm land where the owner had failed to pay property taxes. Next, the government would hire the unemployed to work at the factories and on the farms on a basis of production for use instead of production for profit. The farms and factories would then operate as self-sufficient, worker-run co-ops.

EPIC also called for the implementation of California's first state income tax. The tax was to be progressive, with the wealthiest being taxed at 30%. The plan would also have increased inheritance taxes and instituted a 4% tax on stock transfers. EPIC also included government-provided pensions for the old, disabled, and widowed. To implement EPIC, Sinclair called for the creation of three new government agencies: the California Authority for Land (CAL), the California Authority for Production (CAP), and the California Authority for Money (CAM). CAL was to implement the plan for seizure and cultivation of unused farm lands. CAP was to do the same for idle factories. CAM meanwhile was to be used to finance CAL and CAP by issuing scrip to workers and issuing bonds for the purchase of lands, factories, and machinery.

== Campaign ==
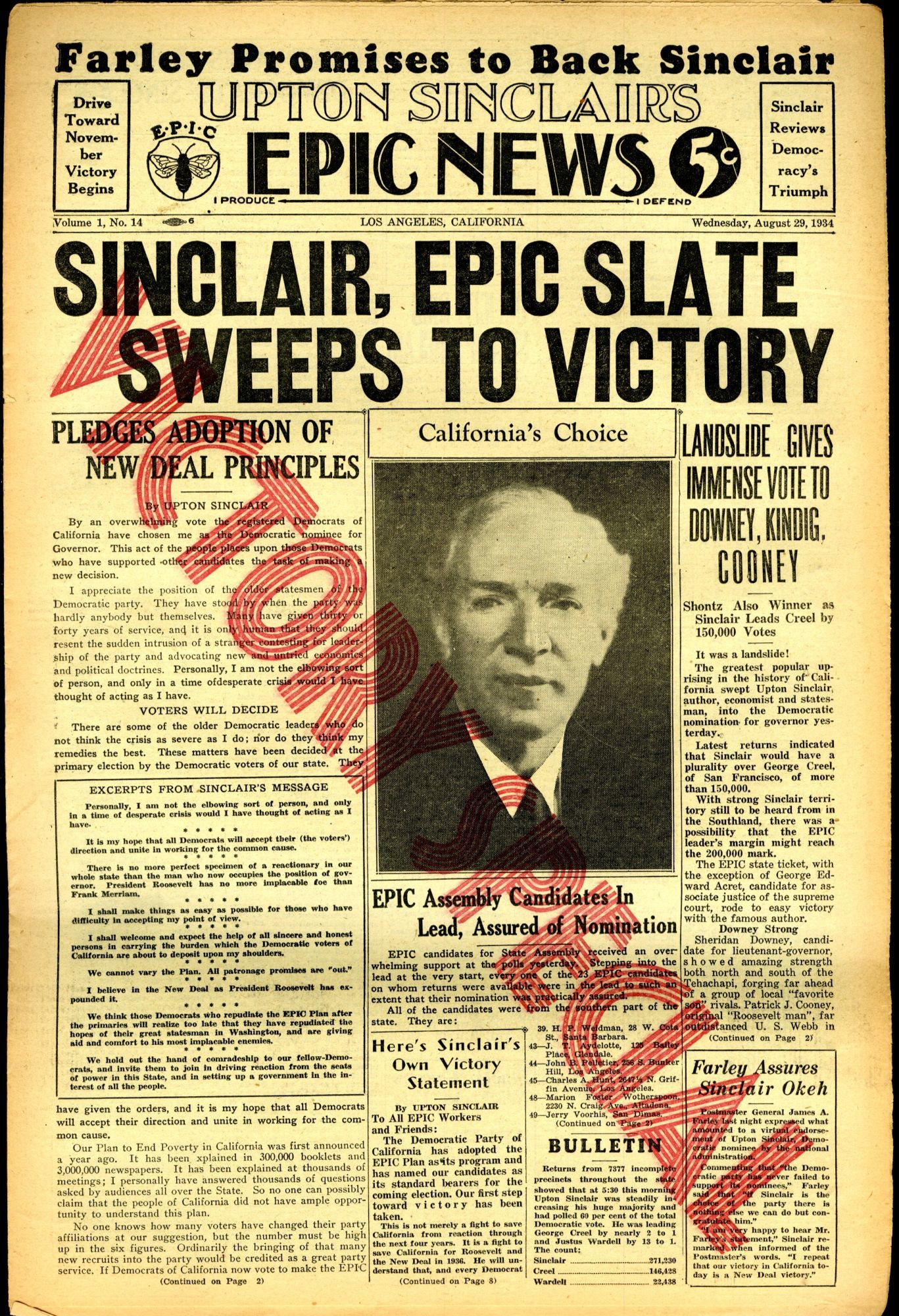
Front page of EPIC News following Sinclair's primary victory, August 29, 1934

After two previous unsuccessful runs for the U.S. Congress as a member of the Socialist Party, Sinclair was encouraged by the election of President Roosevelt in 1932 to switch his affiliation to the Democratic Party in September 1933. A grassroots movement soon formed in support of EPIC, with thousands joining End Poverty Leagues across the state. A weekly newspaper, the EPIC News, appeared in support of the plan, and reached a circulation of nearly a million by the time of the gubernatorial primary election in August 1934. Several EPIC-supporting candidates won their primaries for California State Assembly and Senate seats. Sinclair did not receive full support from the party establishment, however, and Roosevelt refused to endorse him, seeing the EPIC plan as too radical. Sinclair's opponents claimed that he sought to "Sovietize California".

The Socialist Party in California and nationwide refused to allow its members to be active in any other party including the Democratic Party and expelled him, along with socialists who supported his California campaign. The expulsions destroyed the Socialist Party in California.

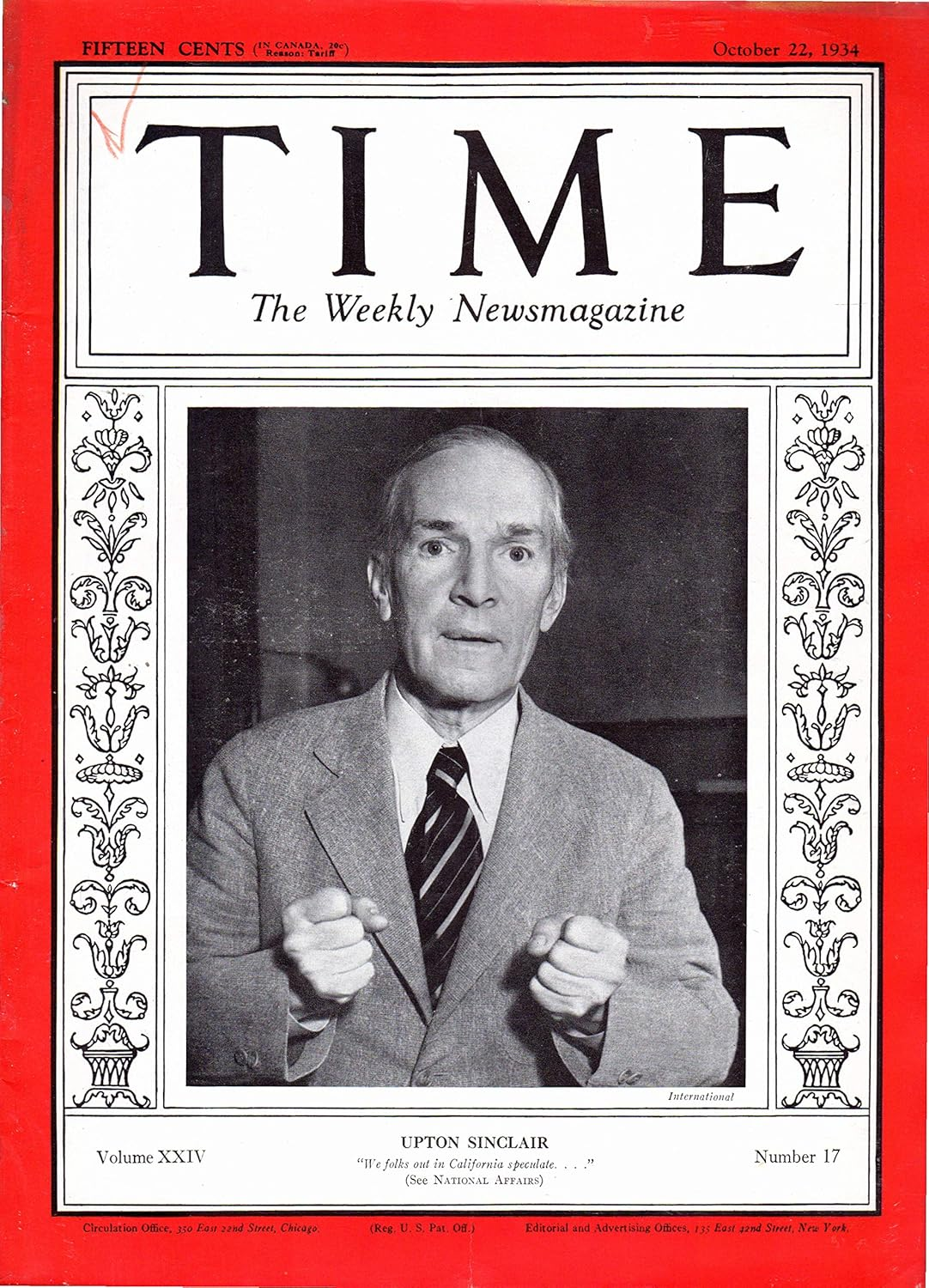
Sinclair on the cover of Time magazine, October 22, 1934

EPIC faced major opposition by the Republican Party and major media figures. According to Greg Mitchell's 2017 article on EPIC in The Nation, opponents of EPIC "organized the most lavish and creative dirty-tricks campaign ever seen—one that was to become a landmark in American politics" involving "turning over a major campaign to outside advertising, publicity, media and fundraising consultants for the first time."

The heads of Hollywood's major movie studios strongly opposed EPIC, largely due to Sinclair's proposal to hand over idle movie studio lots to unemployed film workers to make movies of their own. The studio heads reacted by threatening to move film operations to Florida and deducting money from employee paychecks to finance the campaign of Sinclair's Republican opponent for governor, Frank Merriam. Two of California's most influential figures in print media, William Randolph Hearst and Harry Chandler, also used their papers to support Merriam's campaign and attack Sinclair.

In the face of this coordinated opposition, and without the backing of Roosevelt, Sinclair fell behind Merriam in the polls. On November 6, 1934, Merriam defeated Sinclair with 1,138,620 (48.9%) to Sinclair's 879,537 (37.8%). Even in defeat, Sinclair received twice as many votes as any previous Democratic candidate for governor. In addition, two dozen candidates running on the EPIC platform were elected to the state legislature, including Culbert Olson, who became governor four years later.

== Movement ==
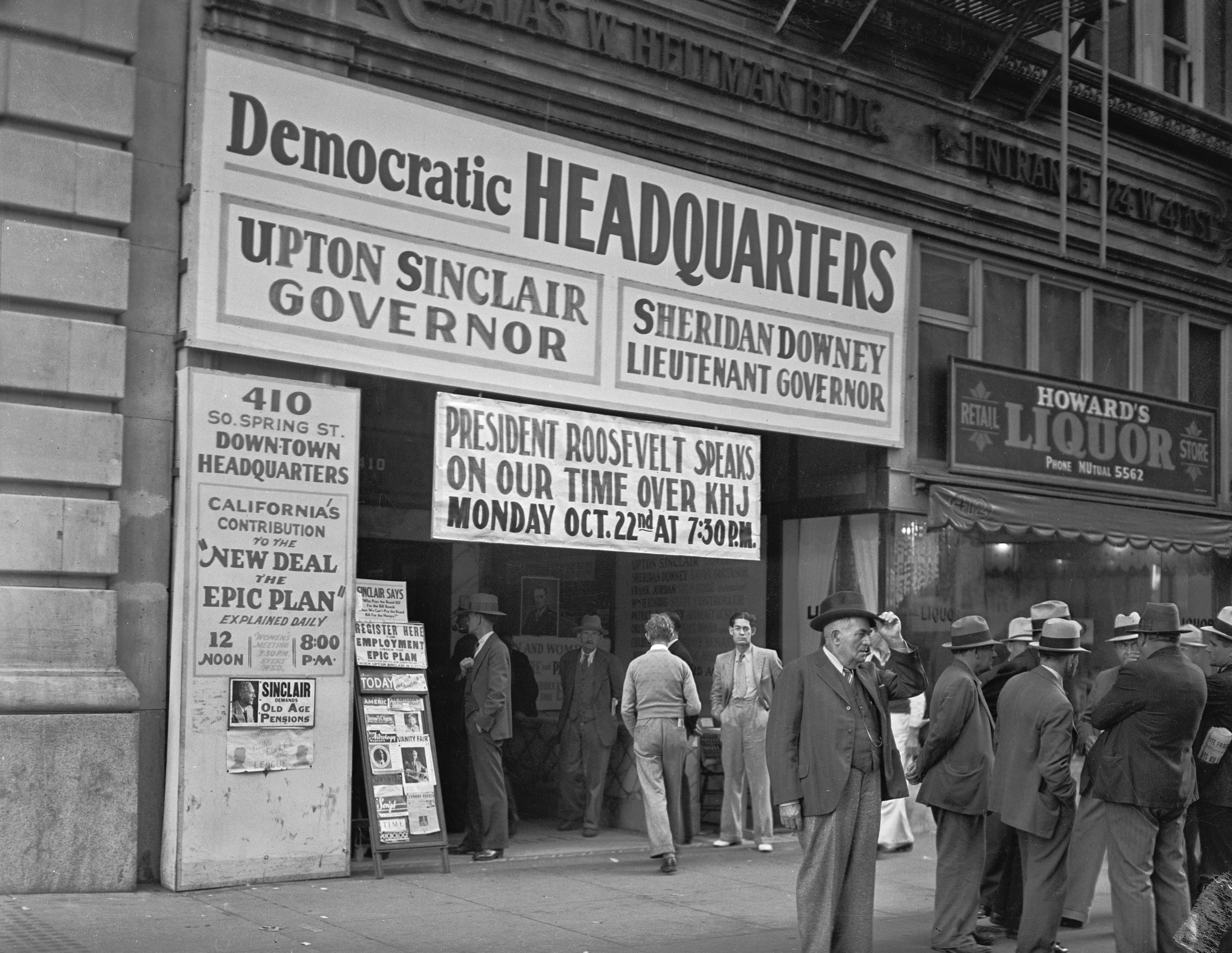
Democratic headquarters in Downtown Los Angeles during the campaign, October 1934

The EPIC movement continued after Sinclair's defeat. It "recalled a mayor, kicked out a district attorney, replaced the governor with one of our choice" between 1934 and 1938, according to Robert A. Heinlein, who by then was deputy publisher of the EPIC News. Heinlein also ran for the State Assembly in Hollywood and Beverly Hills in 1938. He lost, causing him to take up science fiction writing to pay off his campaign debt.

Sinclair's EPIC platform, especially the production for use plank, inspired the formation of "Commonwealth Builders Inc." in the state of Washington, which pursued an "End Poverty in Washington" campaign that elected 35 state legislators and a U.S. Senator, Lewis B. Schwellenbach. The organization would later become the Washington Commonwealth Federation.

During the 1936 Democratic Party presidential primaries, an EPIC slate nominally pledged to Sinclair for president was registered in California; they actually supported Franklin D. Roosevelt, but opposed U.S. Senator William Gibbs McAdoo, who headed the president's slate. Among the EPIC slate's candidates were Sinclair, his wife Mary Craig, geographer Peveril Meigs, labor leader Herbert Stanley Calvert, and State Assemblymen Ben Rosenthal, Ernest O. Voigt, and Amos Franklin Glover. The slate lost to Roosevelt's by a margin of eight to one.

== Legacy ==
Despite Sinclair's defeat, EPIC is recognized as having been very influential in shaping Roosevelt's New Deal programs. In late 1934, Harry Hopkins, a senior adviser to Roosevelt who went on to oversee many New Deal programs, proposed an "End Poverty in America" campaign that The New York Times wrote "differs from Sinclair's plan in detail, but not in principle." Consumer and producer cooperative programs administered by the Federal Emergency Relief Administration and Farm Security Administration can be at least partly attributed to EPIC.

In 2022, universal basic income advocate and former Mayor of Stockton Michael Tubbs created "End Poverty in California" (EPIC), a nonprofit antipoverty organization with the same name and acronym that was inspired by Sinclair's campaign. Sinclair's movement is thought to have been extremely influential in California politics, setting the tone for campaigns between state Democrats and Republicans for decades to come.

== Candidates supported ==
=== Statewide office ===
- Upton Sinclair, candidate for governor of California (1934), muckraker, author of several novels including The Jungle
- Sheridan Downey, U.S. Senator from California (1939–1950), candidate for lieutenant governor of California (1934)
- Patrick J. Cooney, candidate for California Attorney General (1934)
- Erroll O. Shour, candidate for California Attorney General (1934)
- Frank C. Jordan, California Secretary of State (1911–1940)
- Will H. Kindig, Los Angeles City Council member (1935–1937), candidate for California State Controller (1934)
- William A. Ward, candidate for California State Treasurer (1934)
- George Edward Acret, candidate for Associate Justice of the Supreme Court of California (1934)
- John F. Dondero, candidate for California State Board of Equalization (1934)
- Fred R. Drinkhouse, write-in candidate for California State Board of Equalization (1934)
- Orfa Jean Shontz, member of the California State Board of Equalization (1935–1939)

=== State legislative office ===
- James J. Boyle, California Assemblyman (1933–1939)
- James M. Cassidy, California Assemblyman (1933–1941)
- John Gee Clark, California Assemblyman (1935–1939)
- Leon M. Donihue, California Assemblyman (1935–1939)
- Ralph W. Evans, California Assemblyman (1935–1937)
- Gene Flint, California Assemblyman (1935–1939)
- Lee E. Geyer, U.S. Representative (1939–1941), California Assemblyman (1935–1937)
- Wilbur F. Gilbert, California Assemblyman (1935–1941)
- Amos Franklin Glover, California Assemblyman (1935–1937)
- Augustus F. Hawkins, U.S. Representative (1963–1991), California Assemblyman (1935–1963), first African American congressman from California
- Charles A. Hunt, California Assemblyman (1933–1939)
- William Moseley Jones, Speaker of the California State Assembly (1937–1938), California Assemblyman (1933–1939)
- Frank D. Laughlin, California Assemblyman (1935–1939)
- Elmer E. Lore, California Assemblyman (1935–1941)
- John D. McCarthy, California Assemblyman (1933–1937)
- Walter McGovern, California State Senator (1935–1939) (Note: This endorsement appears to have been erroneous or was otherwise rescinded.)
- Culbert Olson, Governor of California (1939–1943), California State Senator (1935–1939)
- Ellis E. Patterson, U.S. Representative (1945–1947), Lieutenant Governor of California (1939–1943), California Assemblyman (1933–1939)
- John B. Pelletier, California Assemblyman (1935–1946)
- Fred Reaves, California Assemblyman (1935–1940)
- Paul A. Richie, California Assemblyman (1935–1943)
- Ben Rosenthal, California Assemblyman (1935–1940)
- Ernest O. Voigt, California Assemblyman (1935–1943)
- Jerry Voorhis, U.S. Representative (1937–1947), candidate for State Assembly (1934)
- Charles J. Wagner, California Assemblyman (1935–1937)
- Ralph Lewis Welsh, California Assemblyman (1935–1939)

=== Local office ===
- John W. Baumgartner, Los Angeles City Council member (1933–1945)
- G. Vernon Bennett, Los Angeles City Council member (1935–1951)
- James Marshall Carter, Federal judge (1949–1979), candidate for Los Angeles City Council (1935)
- Parley Parker Christensen, Los Angeles City Council member (1935–1937, 1939–1949), Farmer-Labor candidate for President of the United States (1920)
- Charles W. Dempster, California Assemblyman (1931–1935), candidate for Los Angeles City Council (1935), served in three separate state legislatures (Montana, Idaho, and California)
- John Anson Ford, Los Angeles County supervisor (1934–1958)
- James M. Hyde, Los Angeles City Council member (1931–1939)
- Herbert C. Legg, Los Angeles County supervisor (1934–1938, 1950–1958)
- Delamere Francis McCloskey, Los Angeles City Council member (1941–1945), candidate for Los Angeles municipal judge (1935)
- James B. McSheehy, San Francisco Board of Supervisors member (1918–1942)

== Supporters ==
=== Elected officials ===
- Franklin Pierce Buyer, Los Angeles City Council member (1933–1939) (Note: Was not endorsed for re-election by EPIC in 1935.)
- Charles J. Colden, U.S. Representative (1933–1938)
- Thomas F. Ford, U.S. Representative (1933–1945)
- John S. McGroarty, U.S. Representative (1935–1939)
- Byron N. Scott, U.S. Representative (1935–1939) (Note: EPIC did not endorse candidates for federal office.)
- Henry A. Wallace, United States Secretary of Agriculture (1933–1940)
- J. Stitt Wilson, former Socialist mayor of Berkeley (1911–1913)

=== Activists ===
- Bill Busick, former chairman of the Socialist Party of California (1930–1932)
- Herbert Stanley Calvert, labor leader
- Ralph C. Dills, campaign manager for Lee Geyer, future California Assemblyman (1939–1949), California State Senator (1967–1998)
- George H. McLain, pension promoter
- Kate Richards O'Hare, activist, chairwoman of the End Poverty League
- John C. Packard, attorney of Upton Sinclair, future chairman of the California Industrial Welfare Commission (1940–1947)

=== Performers ===
- Charlie Chaplin, actor
- Jean Harlow, actress
- Ben Legere, actor
- Groucho Marx, comedian
- Will Rogers, humorist

=== Writers ===
- Reuben W. Borough, editor of EPIC News, candidate for U.S. Senate (1952)
- Gene Fowler, author, co-founder of 'Author's League for Sinclair'
- Robert A. Heinlein, candidate for State Assembly (1938), author of several science fiction novels including Stranger in a Strange Land and Starship Troopers
- Lillian Hellman, playwright
- Aldous Huxley, author
- Nunnally Johnson, screenwriter
- Dudley Nichols, screenwriter
- Dorothy Parker, poet
- Frank Scully, journalist, co-founder of 'Author's League for Sinclair'
- Mary Craig Sinclair, writer, wife of Upton Sinclair
- Donald Ogden Stewart, screenwriter
- Dorothy Thompson, journalist, co-founder of 'Author's League for Sinclair'
- Rob Wagner, editor and publisher of Script

=== Miscellaneous ===
- Peveril Meigs, geographer
- Stanley Mosk, lawyer, future Associate Justice of the California Supreme Court (1964–2001)

== See also ==
- 1934 California gubernatorial election
- Washington Commonwealth Federation
- Ham and Eggs Movement
- Townsend Plan
- Utopian Socialists of America

== Sources ==
- "Sinclair Would Place Jobless on Ranches". Call-Bulletin. July 12, 1934.
- Sinclair, Upton (1934). Immediate EPIC. Los Angeles: End Poverty League. LCCN 36000289. OL 6331958M – via Social Security Administration.
- Katers, Nicholas. "The Brilliant Failure of Upton Sinclair and the EPIC Movement". Yahoo Voices. Archived from the original on 15 May 2013.
- Mitchell, Greg (1992). The Campaign of the Century: Upton Sinclair's Race for Governor of California and the Birth of Media Politics. New York: Random House. p. 617. ISBN 0-679-41168-2.
- Lund, Dennis. "Socialism: Why the Label Won't Go Away". The Benicia Herald.
