= Charles Dempster =

Charles Dempster may refer to:

- Charles Dempster (Australian politician) (1839–1907), politician in Western Australia
- Charles W. Dempster (1879–1941), American politician who served in the state legislatures of Montana, Idaho, and California
- Stewie Dempster (Charles Stewart Dempster, 1903–1974), New Zealand cricketer and coach
