= Amos Franklin Glover =

American politician

A. Franklin Glover
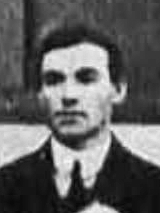
- Glover in 1906

Member of the California State Assembly from the 69th district
- In office January 7, 1935 – January 4, 1937
- Preceded by: Walter H. Sullivan
- Succeeded by: Fred P. Glick

Personal details
- Born: January 24, 1880 Brant, Michigan, U.S.
- Died: May 18, 1959 (aged 79) Santa Paula, California, U.S.
- Resting place: Inglewood Park Cemetery
- Party: Democratic
- Spouse: Grace
- Children: 5
- Education: University of Denver

Amos Franklin Glover (January 24, 1880 – May 18, 1959) was an American realtor and politician who served in the California State Assembly for the 69th district from 1935 to 1937. During his tenure, he sponsored legislation promoting producer and consumer cooperatives.

Glover was one of two dozen "EPIC Democrats" elected to the state legislature in 1934. During the 1936 Democratic Party presidential primaries, he joined an EPIC slate nominally pledged to Upton Sinclair for president; they actually supported Franklin D. Roosevelt, but opposed U.S. Senator William Gibbs McAdoo, who headed the president's slate. The EPIC slate lost to Roosevelt's by a margin of eight to one.
