= Peveril Meigs =

American geographer (1903–1979)

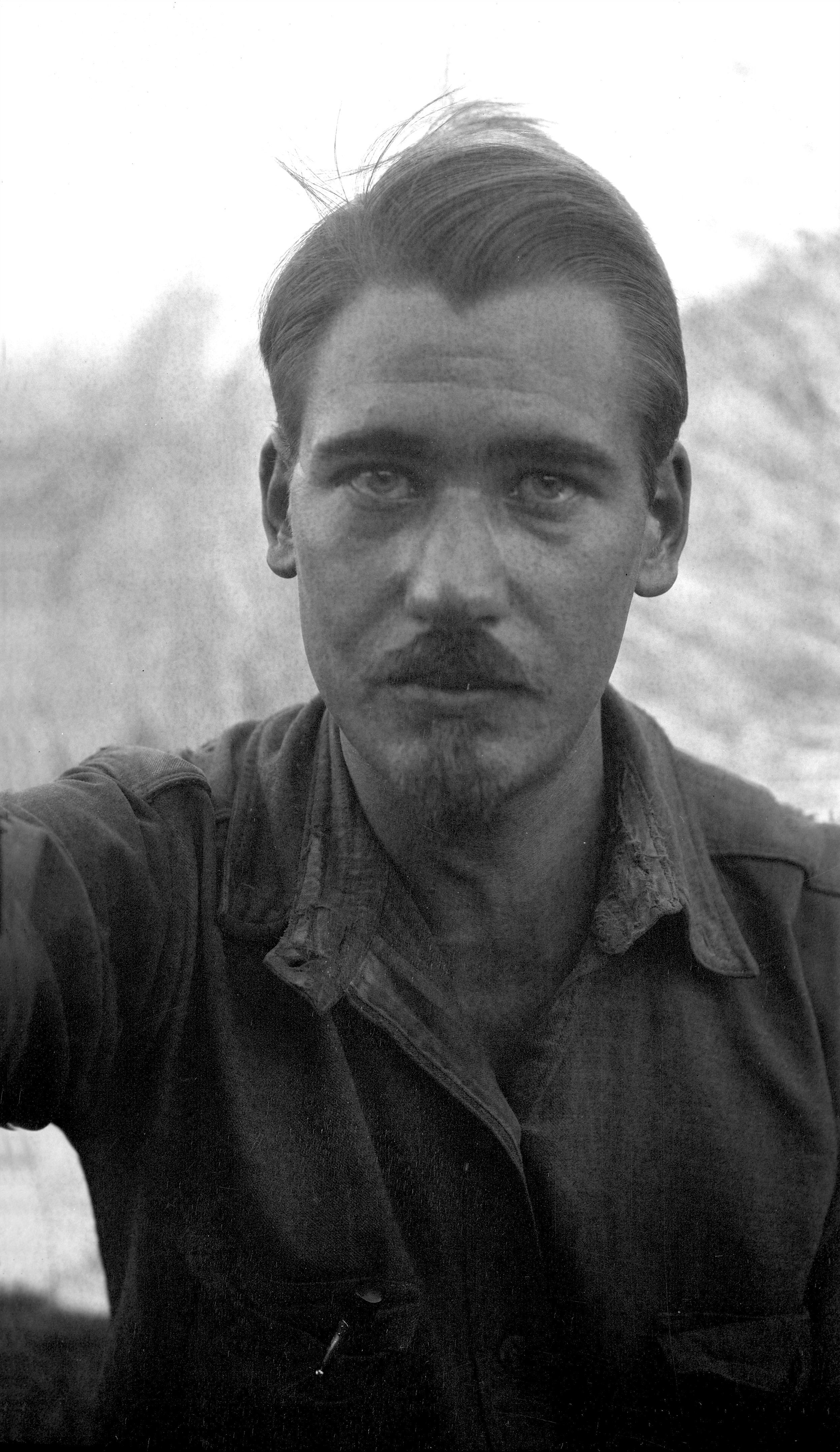
Meigs in 1927

Peveril Meigs III (May 5, 1903 – September 16, 1979) was an American geographer, notable for his studies of arid lands on several continents and in particular for his work on the native peoples and early missions of northern Baja California, Mexico.

== Biography ==
Meigs was born in Flushing in New York City. He studied at the University of California, Berkeley, receiving his B.A. degree in 1925 and a Ph.D. in 1932. He held academic positions at San Francisco State Teachers College (1929), Chico State College (1929-1942), Louisiana State University (1938-1939), American University (1948), and George Washington University (1948).

During the 1936 Democratic Party presidential primaries, Meigs joined an EPIC slate nominally pledged to Upton Sinclair for president; they actually supported Franklin D. Roosevelt, but opposed U.S. Senator William Gibbs McAdoo, who headed the president's slate. The EPIC slate lost to Roosevelt's by a margin of eight to one.

Beginning during World War II, Meigs was employed primarily by the U.S. government, working for the Office of Strategic Services (OSS) (1942-1944), Joint Intelligence Study Publishing Board (1944-1947), Earth Sciences Division of the U.S. Army Quartermaster Corps (1949-1953), and Quartermaster Research and Engineering Center (1953-1965). In the red scare of the early 1950s, Meigs was prominent among those listed as security risks by Senator Joseph McCarthy.

Meigs published dozens of articles and books. Particularly notable was his early work on Baja California, which was influenced by his Berkeley mentors, Carl O. Sauer in historical geography and Alfred L. Kroeber in ethnography.

He co-authored with Sauer a study of Mission San Fernando Velicatá, the only mission founded by the Franciscans during their brief tenure (1768-1773) on the peninsula. Meigs' doctoral dissertation (1932) was a groundbreaking study of the Dominican missions of northwestern Baja California. It was subsequently published and remains the key source on the subject.

During his field trips to northern Baja California, particularly in 1928, 1929, and 1936, Meigs became familiar with the region's surviving Indian groups. He published a monograph on the Kiliwa (1939) that continues to be the most reliable source concerning the aboriginal lifeways of that people. Also included were important notes on the neighboring Paipai and Kumeyaay. After his retirement in 1965, Meigs published several additional articles on the ethnography and archaeology of these groups, based on his notes from his earlier field studies. His book on the coastal deserts was published by UNESCO in 1966. He also mapped tide mills along the Atlantic coast of the U.S.

Has died aged 76 in Wayland, Middlesex County, Massachusetts.

== Bibliography ==
- Meigs, Peveril, III. 1935. The Dominican Mission Frontier of Lower California. University of California Publications in Geography No. 7. Berkeley.
- Meigs, Peveril, III. 1939. The Kiliwa Indians of Lower California. Iberoamericana No. 15. University of California, Berkeley.
- Meigs, Peveril, III. 1966. Geography of Coastal Deserts. Arid Zone Research No. 28. UNESCO, Paris.
- Meigs, Peveril, III. 1970. "Capes of Human Hair from Baja California and Outside". Pacific Coast Archaeological Society Quarterly 6(1):21-28.
- Meigs, Peveril, III. 1971. "Creation Myth and Other Reflections of the Nijí Mishkwish". Pacific Coast Archaeological Society Quarterly 7(1):9-13.
- Meigs, Peveril, III. 1972. "Notes on the La Huerta Jat'am, Baja California: Place Names, Hunting, and Shamans". Pacific Coast Archaeological Society Quarterly 8(1):35-40.
- Meigs, Peveril, III. 1974. "Field Notes on the Sh'un and Jat'am, Manteca, Baja California". Pacific Coast Archaeological Society Quarterly 10(1):19-28.
- Meigs, Peveril, III. 1974. "Meigs on Tablas". Pacific Coast Archaeological Society Quarterly 10(1):37-38.
- Meigs, Peveril, III. 1976. "Some Pictographs in Northern Baja California". Pacific Coast Archaeological Society Quarterly 12(1):2-8.
- Meigs, Peveril, III. 1977. "Notes on the Paipai of San Isidoro, Baja California". Pacific Coast Archaeological Society Quarterly 13(1):11-20.
- Sauer, Carl O., and Peveril Meigs, III. 1927. "Site and Culture at San Fernando de Velicatá". University of California Publications in Geography 2:271-302. Berkeley.
