= 1933 Los Angeles mayoral election =

- May 2, 1933 and June 6, 1933
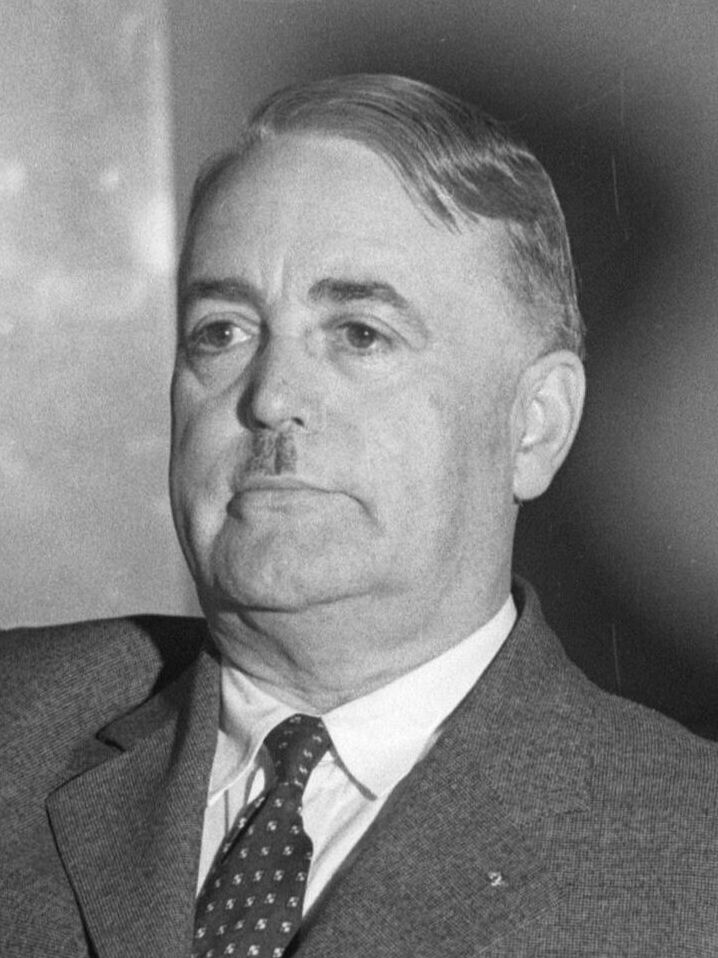

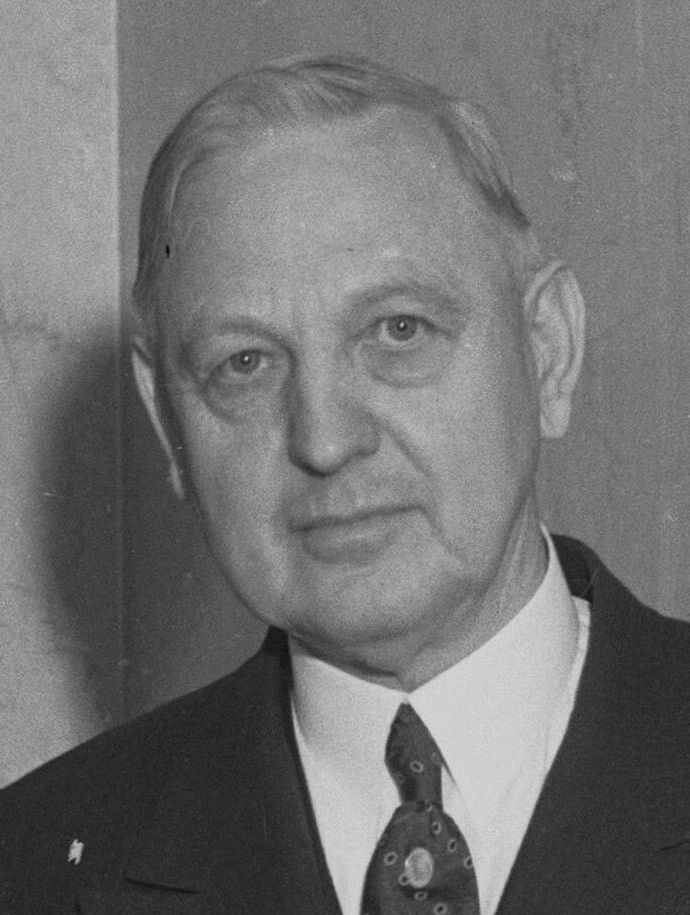

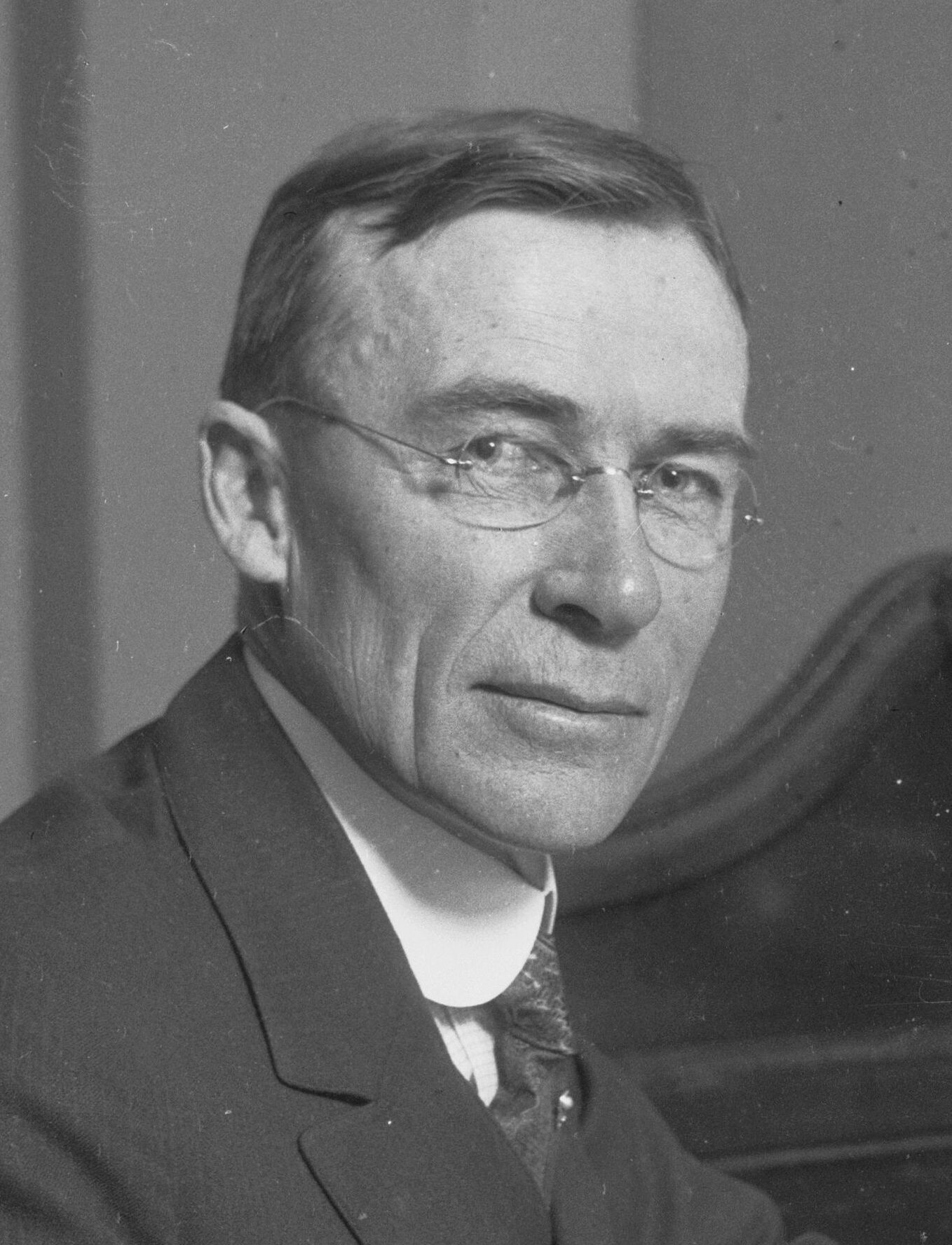

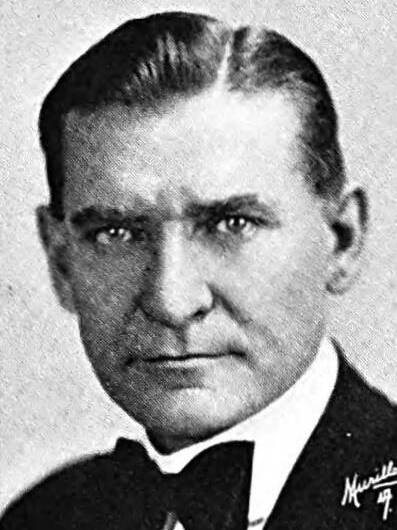
Candidate	Frank L. Shaw	John Clinton Porter
First round	118,775; 35.9%	111,540; 33.7%
Runoff	187,868; 54.7%	155,784; 45.3%
Candidate	George E. Cryer	Charles W. Dempster
First round	36,193; 10.9%	35,285; 10.7%
Runoff	Eliminated	Eliminated
Mayor before election
John Clinton Porter
Democratic
Elected Mayor
Frank L. Shaw
Republican

The 1933 Los Angeles mayoral election took place on May 2, 1933, with a run-off election on June 6, 1933. Incumbent John Clinton Porter was defeated by Frank L. Shaw, a Los Angeles County Supervisor, in the runoff election. During the election, Shaw's citizenship was questioned as his birth records could not be located.

Municipal elections in California, including Mayor of Los Angeles, are officially nonpartisan; candidates' party affiliations do not appear on the ballot.

== Election ==
Incumbent John Clinton Porter announced that he would be running for re-election. He was challenged by Los Angeles County Supervisor Frank L. Shaw, former Mayor George E. Cryer, and State Assemblymember Charles W. Dempster. During the election, Shaw's citizenship came under question, as he had been born in Warwick, Ontario, Canada, and his birth records were not found. Because of his birth records, a complaint was filed to try to prevent him from becoming mayor, asserting that he was still only a citizen of Canada and not a citizen of the United States. In the runoff election, Shaw beat Porter by a comfortable margin.

== Results ==
=== Primary election ===
Los Angeles mayoral primary election, May 2, 1933
Candidate	Votes	%
Frank L. Shaw	118,775	35.90
John Clinton Porter (incumbent)	111,540	33.71
George E. Cryer	36,193	10.94
Charles W. Dempster	35,285	10.67
Charles S. Hutson	10,639	3.22
Frank C. Shoemaker	5,539	1.67
Chaim Shapiro	4,702	1.42
Martin C. Neuner	3,511	1.06
George H. McLain	2,354	0.71
Lawrence Ross	2,311	0.70
Total votes	330,849	100.00

=== General election ===
Los Angeles mayoral general election, June 6, 1933
Candidate	Votes	%
Frank L. Shaw	187,868	54.67
John Clinton Porter (incumbent)	155,784	45.33
Total votes	343,652	100.00
