= Kuzbass =

Kuzbass (sometimes spelled Kuzbas) is short for Kuznetsk Basin. It may refer to:

- Kuznetsk Basin
- Kuzbass Region, another name for the Kemerovo Oblast
- Kuzbass Autonomous Industrial Colony
- Metallurg-Kuzbass, a Russian football club from Novokuznetsk
- KUZBASS Kemerovo, a Russian football club from Kemerovo
- Kuzbass Kemerovo Bandy Club, a Russian bandy club
