= 1966 California gubernatorial election =

- November 8, 1966
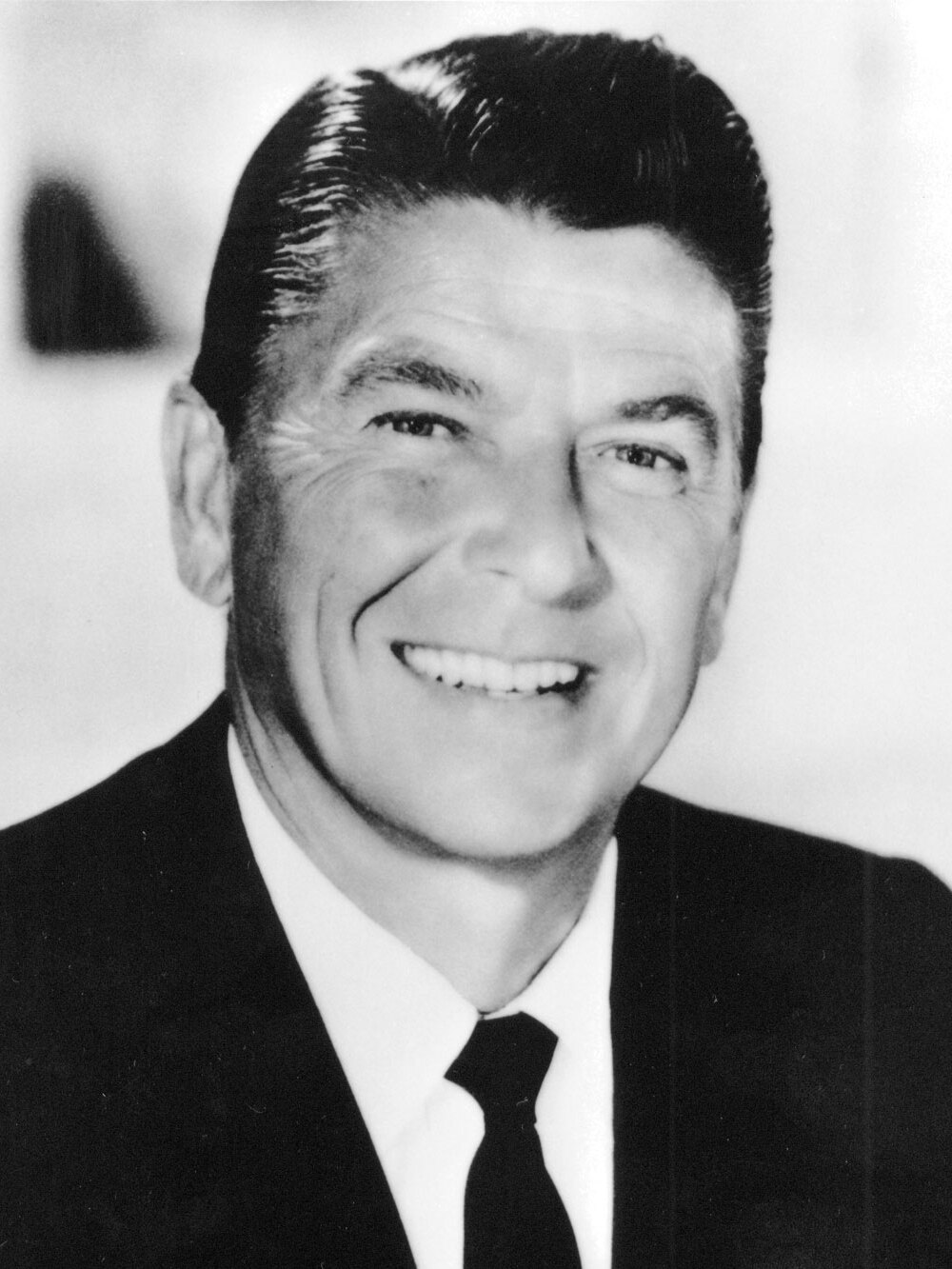

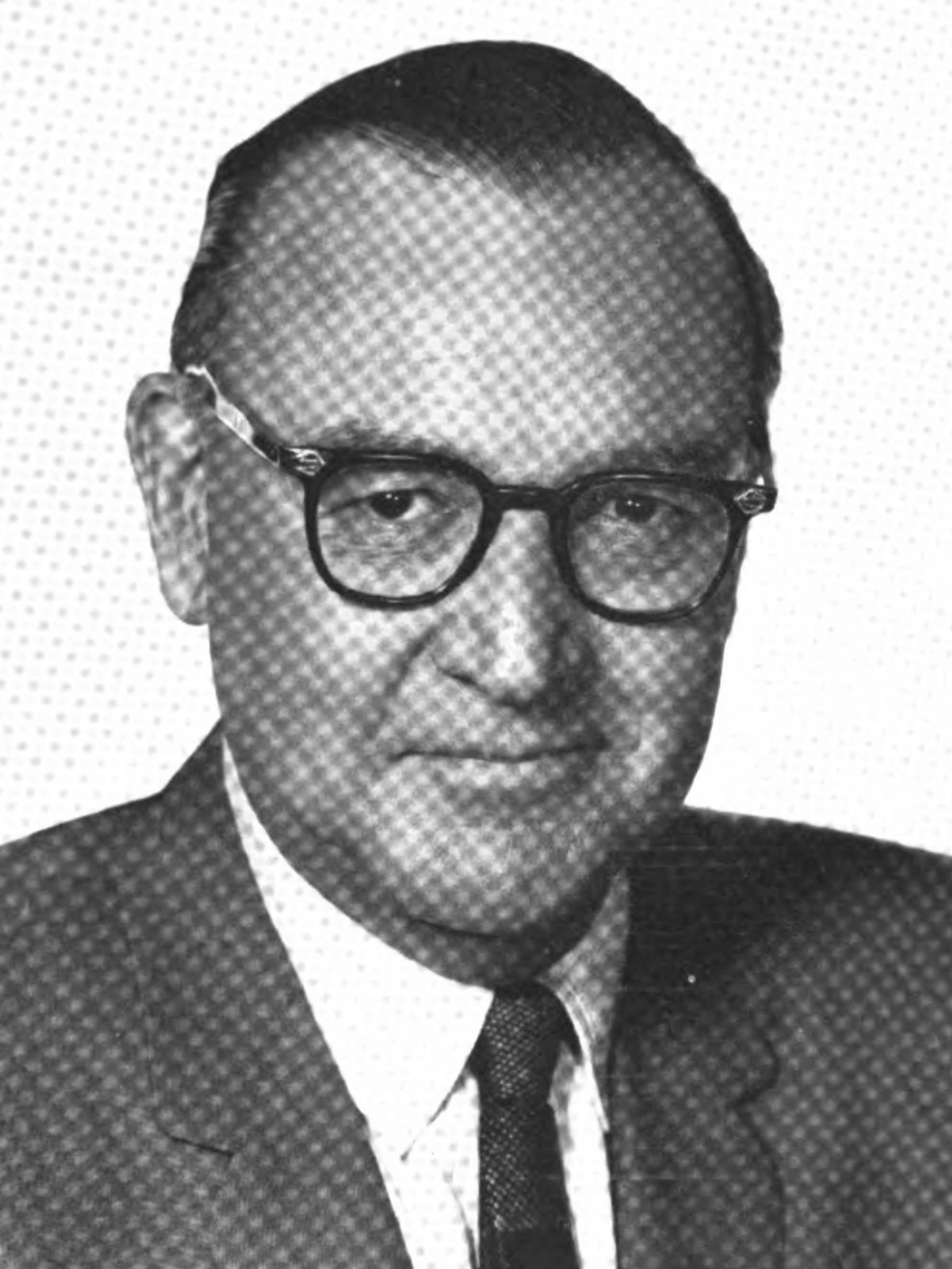
Nominee	Ronald Reagan	Pat Brown
Party	Republican	Democratic
Popular vote	3,742,913	2,749,174
Percentage	57.55%	42.27%
- Reagan: 50–60% 60–70% 70–80% Brown: 50–60% 60–70% 80–90%
Governor before election
Pat Brown
Democratic
Elected Governor
Ronald Reagan
Republican

The 1966 California gubernatorial election was held on November 8, 1966, to elect the governor of California. Republican film actor and future president Ronald Reagan won his first term in office, defeating Democratic two-term incumbent Pat Brown. As of 2026, this remains the last time an incumbent governor of California lost re-election, though one subsequent governor was recalled from office in 2003.

== Background ==
Incumbent governor Pat Brown had been twice elected with significant accomplishments, such as the construction of the state highway system. After his re-election victory over former vice president Richard Nixon in 1962, Brown was strongly considered for Lyndon B. Johnson's running mate in 1964. However, Brown's popularity began to sag amidst the civil disorders of the Watts riots and the early student protests at the University of California, Berkeley including the Free Speech Movement.

== Democratic primary ==
=== Candidates ===
==== Nominee ====
- Pat Brown, incumbent governor

==== Eliminated in primary ====
- Dale Alexander
- Wallace James Duffy
- Ingram W. Goad
- Carlton B. Goodlett, publisher and activist
- Samuel William Yorty, mayor of Los Angeles

=== Results ===
Democratic primary results
Party	Candidate	Votes	%
Democratic	Pat Brown (incumbent)	1,355,262	51.91%
Democratic	Samuel William Yorty	981,088	37.58%
Democratic	Carlton B. Goodlett	95,476	3.66%
Democratic	Wallace James Duffy	77,029	2.95%
Democratic	Dale Alexander	43,453	1.66%
Democratic	Ronald Reagan (write-in)	27,422	1.05%
Democratic	Ingram W. Goad	18,088	0.69%
Democratic	George Christopher (write-in)	13,058	0.50%
Total votes		2,610,876	100.00%

== Republican primary ==
=== Candidates ===
==== Nominee ====
- Ronald Reagan, actor and former president of the Screen Actors Guild

==== Eliminated in primary ====
- George Christopher, former mayor of San Francisco
- Warren N. Dorn, Los Angeles County Supervisor
- Joseph R. Maxwell
- William Penn Patrick, businessman

=== Campaign ===
California's liberal Republicans including George Christopher leveled attacks on Ronald Reagan for his conservative positions. In response, Reagan popularized the eleventh commandment created by California Republican Party chairman Gaylord Parkinson. In his 1990 autobiography An American Life, Reagan attributed the rule to Parkinson, explained its origin, and claimed to have followed it, writing, "The personal attacks against me during the primary finally became so heavy that the state Republican chairman, Gaylord Parkinson, postulated what he called the Eleventh Commandment: Thou shalt not speak ill of any fellow Republican. It's a rule I followed during that campaign and have ever since." Parkinson used the phrase as common ground to prevent a split in the party.

Polls in February 1966 showed Christopher with a seven-point lead over Brown and Brown leading Reagan by four, so Brown sought to influence the Republican primary in Reagan's favor by having operatives pass negative claims against Christopher to columnist Drew Pearson.

=== Results ===
Republican primary results
Party	Candidate	Votes	%
Republican	Ronald Reagan	1,417,623	64.68%
Republican	George Christopher	675,683	30.83%
Republican	Warren N. Dorn	44,812	2.04%
Republican	William Penn Patrick	40,887	1.87%
Republican	Joseph R. Maxwell	7,052	0.32%
Republican	Samuel William Yorty (write-in)	3,993	0.18%
Republican	Edmund G. "Pat" Brown (write-in)	1,700	0.08%
Total votes		2,191,750	100.00%

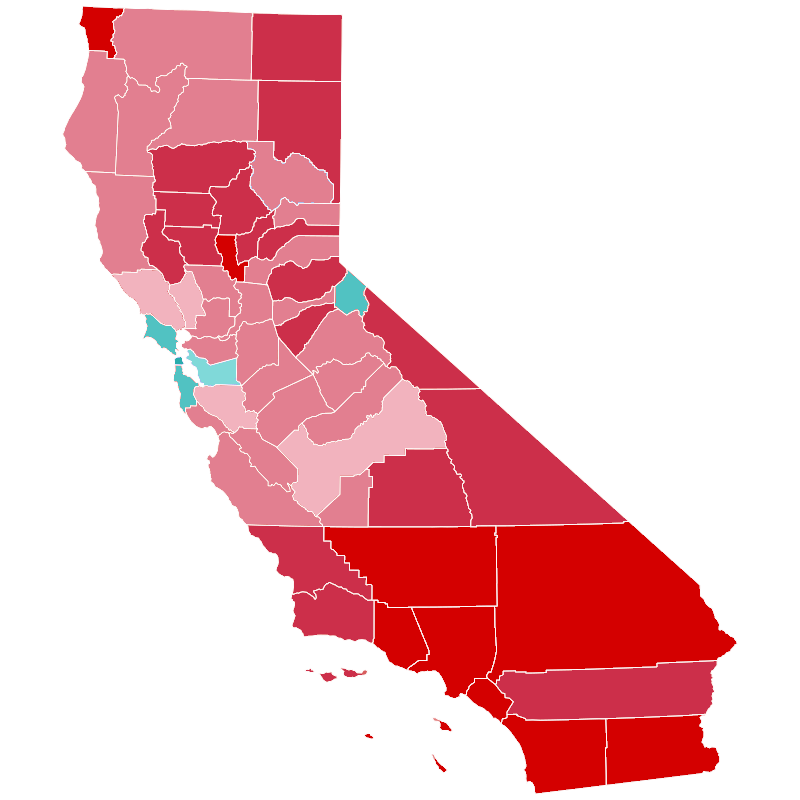
Results by County: Reagan-70–80% Reagan-60–70% Reagan-50–60% Reagan-40–50% Christopher—60–70% Christopher—50–60% Christopher—40–50%

== General election ==
=== Candidates ===
- Pat Brown, incumbent Governor since 1959 (Democratic)
- Ronald Reagan, actor and former president of the Screen Actors Guild (Republican)
- Bill Busick, restaurant owner and taxpayers' rights advocate (write-in)

=== Campaign ===
With the nomination of Reagan, a well-known and charismatic political outsider-actor, the Republicans seized upon Brown's sudden unpopularity evidenced by a tough battle in the Democratic primary. Nixon worked tirelessly behind the scenes and Reagan trumpeted his law-and-order campaign message, going into the general election with a great deal of momentum. After pollsters discovered that the Berkeley student protests were a major priority of Republican voters, Reagan repeatedly promised to "clean up the mess at Berkeley".

At first, Brown tried to smear Reagan's conservative supporters with "lame Nazi metaphors". After Reagan deftly parried that tactic, Brown made a serious gaffe. He ran a television commercial in which he used a rhetorical question to remind a group of elementary school children that John Wilkes Booth, another actor, had killed Abraham Lincoln. Brown's crude comparison of Reagan to Booth based on their common background as actors—in the state that happens to be home to Hollywood—did not go over well with the California electorate. Within 48 hours, Reagan had overtaken Brown in the polls.

With a lead that grew throughout September and October, Reagan won by 993,739 votes, aided by traditionally Democratic working-class areas in Los Angeles and elsewhere. Brown won in only three counties, Alameda, Plumas, and San Francisco. He narrowly won Alameda by about 2,000 votes and Plumas by about 100 votes.

=== Results ===
1966 California gubernatorial election
Party	Candidate	Votes	%	±%
Republican	Ronald Reagan	3,742,913	57.55%	+10.74%
Democratic	Pat Brown (incumbent)	2,749,174	42.27%	−9.62%
	Scattering	11,358	0.17%	
Majority		993,739	15.28%	
Total votes		6,503,445	100.00%	
Republican gain from Democratic		Swing	+20.35%	

==== Results by county ====
County	Ronald Reagan Republican		Edmund G. Brown Democratic		Scattering Write-in		Margin		Total votes cast
County	#	%	#	%	#	%	#	%	Total votes cast
Alameda	189,055	49.54%	190,968	50.04%	1,607	0.42%	–1,913	–0.50%	381,630
Alpine	148	65.78%	77	34.22%	0	0.00%	71	31.56%	225
Amador	2,985	58.29%	2,132	41.63%	4	0.08%	853	16.66%	5,121
Butte	25,443	67.48%	12,263	32.52%	0	0.00%	13,180	34.95%	37,706
Calaveras	3,810	67.72%	1,812	32.21%	4	0.07%	1,998	35.51%	5,626
Colusa	2,806	62.07%	1,713	37.89%	2	0.04%	1,093	24.18%	4,521
Contra Costa	107,543	54.79%	87,525	44.59%	1,217	0.62%	20,018	10.20%	196,285
Del Norte	3,409	63.96%	1,918	35.98%	3	0.06%	1,491	27.97%	5,330
El Dorado	9,189	62.97%	5,378	36.86%	25	0.17%	3,811	26.12%	14,592
Fresno	70,182	53.90%	59,869	45.98%	167	0.13%	10,313	7.92%	130,218
Glenn	4,676	66.33%	2,371	33.63%	3	0.04%	2,305	32.70%	7,050
Humboldt	19,210	57.16%	14,374	42.77%	23	0.07%	4,836	14.39%	33,607
Imperial	12,372	62.84%	7,307	37.12%	8	0.04%	5,065	25.73%	19,687
Inyo	3,961	66.14%	2,023	33.78%	5	0.08%	1,938	32.36%	5,989
Kern	64,716	62.62%	38,543	37.29%	96	0.09%	26,173	25.32%	103,355
Kings	9,957	55.77%	7,890	44.19%	7	0.04%	2,067	11.58%	17,854
Lake	5,499	63.01%	3,217	36.86%	11	0.13%	2,282	26.15%	8,727
Lassen	3,190	53.95%	2,723	46.05%	0	0.00%	467	7.90%	5,913
Los Angeles	1,389,995	57.18%	1,037,663	42.68%	3,435	0.14%	352,332	14.49%	2,431,093
Madera	7,490	54.13%	6,335	45.78%	12	0.09%	1,155	8.35%	13,837
Marin	40,411	57.02%	30,230	42.66%	227	0.32%	10,181	14.37%	70,868
Mariposa	1,811	61.45%	1,133	38.45%	3	0.10%	678	23.01%	2,947
Mendocino	10,161	59.76%	6,827	40.15%	15	0.09%	3,334	19.61%	17,003
Merced	14,103	52.98%	12,499	46.96%	16	0.06%	1,604	6.03%	26,618
Modoc	1,946	62.67%	1,156	37.23%	3	0.10%	790	25.44%	3,105
Mono	1,205	77.84%	343	22.16%	0	0.00%	862	55.68%	1,548
Monterey	35,944	60.96%	22,923	38.88%	96	0.16%	13,021	22.08%	58,963
Napa	17,740	59.45%	12,060	40.42%	40	0.13%	5,680	19.03%	29,840
Nevada	7,373	65.80%	3,823	34.12%	9	0.08%	3,550	31.68%	11,205
Orange	293,413	72.06%	113,275	27.82%	466	0.11%	180,138	44.24%	407,154
Placer	14,664	54.55%	12,187	45.33%	32	0.12%	2,477	9.21%	26,883
Plumas	2,658	49.15%	2,747	50.80%	3	0.06%	–89	–1.65%	5,408
Riverside	84,501	62.35%	50,112	36.98%	907	0.67%	34,389	25.38%	135,520
Sacramento	109,801	50.85%	105,861	49.03%	262	0.12%	3,940	1.82%	215,924
San Benito	3,565	60.96%	2,283	39.04%	0	0.00%	1,282	21.92%	5,848
San Bernardino	121,916	62.13%	74,120	37.77%	187	0.10%	47,796	24.36%	196,223
San Diego	252,070	63.76%	142,890	36.14%	398	0.10%	109,180	27.62%	395,358
San Francisco	114,796	41.06%	164,435	58.82%	341	0.12%	–49,639	–17.76%	279,572
San Joaquin	54,647	60.73%	35,281	39.21%	51	0.06%	19,366	21.52%	89,979
San Luis Obispo	21,528	62.52%	12,891	37.44%	13	0.04%	8,637	25.08%	34,432
San Mateo	107,498	53.63%	92,654	46.23%	276	0.14%	14,844	7.41%	200,428
Santa Barbara	50,284	63.21%	28,853	36.27%	414	0.52%	21,431	26.94%	79,551
Santa Clara	164,970	55.33%	132,793	44.54%	410	0.14%	32,177	10.79%	298,173
Santa Cruz	26,988	61.42%	16,913	38.49%	42	0.10%	10,075	22.93%	43,943
Shasta	15,155	54.76%	12,486	45.12%	32	0.12%	2,669	9.64%	27,673
Sierra	650	55.27%	526	44.73%	0	0.00%	124	10.54%	1,176
Siskiyou	7,057	54.17%	5,962	45.76%	9	0.07%	1,095	8.40%	13,028
Solano	23,187	50.11%	23,047	49.81%	39	0.08%	140	0.30%	46,273
Sonoma	41,516	60.57%	26,898	39.24%	126	0.18%	14,618	21.33%	68,540
Stanislaus	31,473	54.36%	26,418	45.63%	10	0.02%	5,055	8.73%	57,901
Sutter	9,828	70.43%	4,126	29.57%	0	0.00%	5,702	40.86%	13,954
Tehama	6,629	62.94%	3,891	36.94%	12	0.11%	2,738	26.00%	10,532
Trinity	2,050	62.23%	1,242	37.70%	2	0.06%	808	24.53%	3,294
Tulare	33,095	59.91%	22,109	40.02%	41	0.07%	10,986	19.89%	55,245
Tuolumne	4,845	58.16%	3,479	41.76%	6	0.07%	1,366	16.40%	8,330
Ventura	58,068	60.82%	37,224	38.99%	181	0.19%	20,844	21.83%	95,473
Yolo	13,073	49.97%	13,032	49.81%	57	0.22%	41	0.16%	26,162
Yuba	6,658	60.50%	4,344	39.47%	3	0.03%	2,314	21.03%	11,005
Total	3,742,913	57.55%	2,749,174	42.27%	11,358	0.17%	993,739	15.28%	6,503,445

==== Counties that flipped from Democratic to Republican ====
- Amador
- Colusa
- Contra Costa
- Del Norte
- El Dorado
- Fresno
- Humboldt
- Kern
- Kings
- Lassen
- Los Angeles
- Madera
- Mendocino
- Merced
- Modoc
- Napa
- Nevada
- Placer
- Sacramento
- San Bernardino
- San Joaquin
- San Luis Obispo
- San Mateo
- Santa Clara
- Shasta
- Sierra
- Siskiyou
- Solano
- Stanislaus
- Tehama
- Trinity
- Tuolumne
- Ventura
- Yolo
- Yuba
