= California's 61st State Assembly district =

American legislative district

Current assemblymember
Tina McKinnor; D–Hawthorne
- Population (2020) • Voting age • Citizen voting age: 491,779; 389,814; 305,884
- Demographics: 18.40% White; 25.25% Black; 45.55% Latino; 5.74% Asian; 0.18% Native American; 0.39% Hawaiian/Pacific Islander; 0.82% other; 3.68% remainder of multiracial
- Registered voters: 213,988
- Registration: 47.91% Democratic; 26.77% Republican; 20.93% No party preference

California's 61st State Assembly district is one of 80 California State Assembly districts. It is currently represented by Democrat Tina McKinnor of Hawthorne.

== District profile ==
The district encompasses a section of southwestern Los Angeles County. The district is primarily urban.

Los Angeles County

- Lennox
- Inglewood
- Lawndale
- Hawthorne
- Gardena - partial
- Los Angeles – partial

== Other levels of government ==
The 61st Assembly district is completely contained within the 35th senatorial district, represented by Democrat Laura Richardson.

In the United States House of Representatives, the 61st Assembly district is part of the California's 43rd congressional district, represented by Democrat Maxine Waters.

== Election results from statewide races ==
Year	Office	Results
2020	President	Biden 63.3 – 34.6%
2018	Governor	Newsom 60.4 – 39.6%
2018	Senator	Feinstein 54.6 – 45.4%
2016	President	Clinton 62.5 – 31.6%
2016	Senator	Harris 54.4 – 45.6%
2014	Governor	Brown 57.1 – 42.9%
2012	President	Obama 63.4 – 34.5%
2012	Senator	Feinstein 64.9 – 35.1%

== List of assembly members representing the district ==
Due to redistricting, the 61st district has been moved around different parts of the state. The current iteration resulted from the 2021 redistricting by the California Citizens Redistricting Commission.

Assembly members	Party	Years served	Counties represented	Notes
Mark S. Torrey	Republican	January 5, 1885 – January 3, 1887	Calaveras	
Fred W. McClenahan	Democratic	January 3, 1887 – January 7, 1889	Calaveras	
John Gardner	Republican	January 7, 1889 – January 5, 1891	Calaveras	
Alexander Brown	Republican	January 5, 1891 – January 2, 1893	Calaveras	
S. J. Duckworth	Republican	January 2, 1893 – January 7, 1895	Monterey	
William George Hudson	Republican	January 7, 1895 – January 2, 1899	Monterey	
Frederick P. Feliz	Democratic	January 2, 1899 – January 5, 1903	Monterey	
Alexander M. Drew	Republican	January 5, 1903 – January 2, 1911	Fresno	
William Angus Sutherland	Republican	January 2, 1911 – January 6, 1913	Fresno	
William Alexander Roberts	Republican	January 6, 1913 – January 4, 1915	Los Angeles	
Harry A. Wishard	Progressive	January 4, 1915 – January 6, 1919	Los Angeles	Ran as a Republican for his 2nd term.
Harry A. Wishard	Republican	January 4, 1915 – January 6, 1919	Los Angeles	Ran as a Republican for his 2nd term.
John Robert White Jr.	Republican	January 6, 1919 – January 8, 1923	Los Angeles	
Frank C. Weller	Republican	January 8, 1923 – January 3, 1927	Los Angeles	
James Cleveland Crawford	Republican	January 3, 1927 – January 5, 1931	Los Angeles	
Clarence N. Wakefield	Republican	January 5, 1931 – January 2, 1933	Los Angeles	
Charles W. Dempster	Republican	January 2, 1933 – January 7, 1935	Los Angeles	
Ernest O. Voigt	Democratic	January 7, 1935 – January 4, 1943	Los Angeles	
Lester A. McMillan	Democratic	January 4, 1943 – January 6, 1969	Los Angeles	
Henry Waxman	Democratic	January 6, 1969 – November 30, 1974	Los Angeles	
Bud Collier	Republican	December 2, 1974 – November 30, 1978	Los Angeles	
Dick Mountjoy	Republican	December 4, 1978 – November 30, 1982	Los Angeles	
Bill Leonard	Republican	December 6, 1982 – November 30, 1988	San Bernardino	
Paul A. Woodruff	Republican	December 5, 1988 – November 30, 1992	San Bernardino	
Fred Aguiar	Republican	December 7, 1992 – November 30, 1998	Los Angeles, San Bernardino	
Nell Soto	Democratic	December 7, 1998 – March 13, 2000	Los Angeles, San Bernardino	Resigns from the State Assembly after winning a seat in the State Senate
Vacant		March 13, 2000 – December 4, 2000	Los Angeles, San Bernardino	
Gloria Negrete McLeod	Democratic	December 4, 2000 – November 30, 2006	Los Angeles, San Bernardino	
Nell Soto	Democratic	December 4, 2006 – November 30, 2008	Los Angeles, San Bernardino	Second stint holding the office
Norma J. Torres	Democratic	December 1, 2008 – November 30, 2012	Los Angeles, San Bernardino	
Jose Medina	Democratic	December 3, 2012 – November 30, 2022	Riverside	
Tina McKinnor	Democratic	December 5, 2022 – present	Los Angeles County	

== Election results (1990–present) ==
=== 2024 ===
2024 California State Assembly 61st district election
Primary election
Party	Candidate	Votes	%
Democratic	Tina McKinnor (incumbent)	52,273	79.5
Republican	Alfonso Hernandez	13,487	20.5
Total votes		65,760	100.0
General election
Democratic	Tina McKinnor (incumbent)	121,661	76.5
Republican	Alfonso Hernandez	37,375	23.5
Total votes		159,036	100.0
Democratic hold			

=== 2022 ===
2022 California State Assembly 61st district election
Primary election
Party	Candidate	Votes	%
Democratic	Robert Pullen-Miles	24,322	38.6
Democratic	Tina McKinnor	20,478	32.5
Republican	James Arlandus Spencer	8,942	14.2
Democratic	Angie Reyes English	6,777	10.7
Democratic	Nico Ruderman	2,540	4.0
Total votes		63,059	100.0
General election
Democratic	Tina McKinnor (incumbent) (Note: Candidate was not an incumbent during the primary but was an incumbent in the general election after winning the special election for the seat. The special election was held on the same day as the primary.)	58,888	63.6
Democratic	Robert Pullen-Miles	33,691	36.4
Total votes		92,579	100.0
Democratic hold			

=== 2020 ===
2020 California State Assembly 61st district election
Primary election
Party	Candidate	Votes	%
Democratic	Jose Medina (incumbent)	51,402	66.2
Republican	Ali Mazarei	26,250	33.8
Total votes		77,652	100.0
General election
Democratic	Jose Medina (incumbent)	116,060	65.9
Republican	Ali Mazarei	59,979	34.1
Total votes		176,039	100.0
Democratic hold			

=== 2018 ===
2018 California State Assembly 61st district election
Primary election
Party	Candidate	Votes	%
Democratic	Jose Medina (incumbent)	36,442	99.4
Republican	Mohammad-Ali Mazarfi (write-in)	212	0.6
Total votes		36,654	100.0
General election
Democratic	Jose Medina (incumbent)	75,327	67.8
Republican	Mohammad-Ali Mazarfi	35,821	32.2
Total votes		111,148	100.0
Democratic hold			

=== 2016 ===
2016 California State Assembly 61st district election
Primary election
Party	Candidate	Votes	%
Democratic	Jose Medina (incumbent)	45,888	67.3
Republican	Hector Diaz	22,281	32.7
Total votes		68,169	100.0
General election
Democratic	Jose Medina (incumbent)	90,663	65.9
Republican	Hector Diaz	46,924	34.1
Total votes		137,587	100.0
Democratic hold			

=== 2014 ===
2014 California State Assembly 61st district election
Primary election
Party	Candidate	Votes	%
Democratic	Jose Medina (incumbent)	13,631	43.8
Republican	Rudy Aranda	12,942	41.6
Democratic	D. Shelly Yarbrough	4,549	14.6
Total votes		31,122	100.0
General election
Democratic	Jose Medina (incumbent)	34,160	58.8
Republican	Rudy Aranda	23,973	41.2
Total votes		58,033	100.0
Democratic hold			

=== 2012 ===
2012 California State Assembly 61st district election
Primary election
Party	Candidate	Votes	%
Democratic	Jose Medina	17,473	44.6
Republican	Bill Batey	13,713	35.0
Republican	Joe Ludwig	6,254	15.9
No party preference	Fredy R. De Leon	1,757	4.5
Republican	Thomas Carlos Ketcham (write-in)	16	0.0
Total votes		39,213	100.0
General election
Democratic	Jose Medina	76,774	61.0
Republican	Bill Batey	49,003	39.0
Total votes		125,777	100.0
Democratic hold			

=== 2010 ===
2010 California State Assembly 61st district election
Party	Candidate	Votes	%
Democratic	Norma Torres (incumbent)	43,813	60.2
Republican	Ray Moors	29,009	39.8
Total votes		72,822	100.0
Democratic hold			

=== 2008 ===
2008 California State Assembly 61st district election
Party	Candidate	Votes	%
Democratic	Norma Torres	61,004	60.5
Republican	Wendy Maier	33,284	33.0
Libertarian	Michael Mendez	6,517	6.5
Total votes		100,805	100.0
Democratic hold			

=== 2006 ===
2006 California State Assembly 61st district election
Party	Candidate	Votes	%
Democratic	Nell Soto	36,482	62.8
Republican	Benjamin Lopez	21,639	37.2
Total votes		58,121	100.0
Democratic hold			

=== 2004 ===
2004 California State Assembly 61st district election
Party	Candidate	Votes	%
Democratic	Gloria Negrete McLeod (incumbent)	58,120	63.6
Republican	Alan Wapner	33,281	36.4
Total votes		91,401	100.0
Democratic hold			

=== 2002 ===
2002 California State Assembly 61st district election
Party	Candidate	Votes	%
Democratic	Gloria Negrete McLeod (incumbent)	31,084	62.5
Republican	Matthew Munson	18,679	37.5
Total votes		49,763	100.0
Democratic hold			

=== 2000 ===
2000 California State Assembly 61st district election
Party	Candidate	Votes	%
Democratic	Gloria Negrete McLeod	51,335	54.0
Republican	Dennis R. Yates	40,751	42.9
Libertarian	David Kocot	2,894	3.0
Total votes		94,980	100.0
Democratic hold			

=== 1998 ===
1998 California State Assembly 61st district election
Party	Candidate	Votes	%
Democratic	Nell Soto	37,382	56.2
Republican	Bob Demallie	29,127	43.8
Total votes		66,509	100.0
Democratic gain from Republican			

=== 1996 ===
1996 California State Assembly 61st district election
Party	Candidate	Votes	%
Republican	Fred Aguiar (incumbent)	44,314	55.0
Democratic	Paul Vincent Avila	32,445	40.3
Libertarian	Michael Alan Piltch	3,800	4.7
Total votes		80,559	100.0
Republican hold			

=== 1994 ===
1994 California State Assembly 61st district election
Party	Candidate	Votes	%
Republican	Fred Aguiar (incumbent)	42,209	64.1
Democratic	Larry Silva	23,653	35.9
Total votes		65,862	100.0
Republican hold			

=== 1992 ===
1992 California State Assembly 61st district election
Party	Candidate	Votes	%
Republican	Fred Aguiar	52,686	58.4
Democratic	Larry S. Simcoe	32,740	36.3
Green	Cynthia Allaire	4,787	5.3
Total votes		90,213	100.0
Republican hold			

=== 1990 ===
1990 California State Assembly 61st district election
Party	Candidate	Votes	%
Republican	Paul A. Woodruff (incumbent)	61,421	56.5
Democratic	Raynolds Johnson	41,173	37.8
Libertarian	Delvin L. Harbour	6,204	5.7
Total votes		108,798	100.0
Republican hold			

== See also ==
- California State Assembly
- California State Assembly districts
- Districts in California
