= Clarence N. Wakefield =

American politician

Member of the California State Assembly from the 61st district
- In office January 5, 1931 - January 2, 1933
- Preceded by: James Cleveland Crawford
- Succeeded by: Charles W. Dempster

Personal details
- Born: September 18, 1894 Tucson, Arizona, US
- Died: July 29, 1967 (aged 72) Seal Beach, California, US
- Party: Republican
- Spouse: Ruth Larimer Wakefield (m. 1917; died 1958)
- Children: 2

Clarence Newton Wakefield (September 18, 1894 - July 29, 1967) served in the California State Assembly for the 61st district from 1931 to 1933 and during World War I he served in the United States Army.
