= Ernest O. Voigt =

American politician

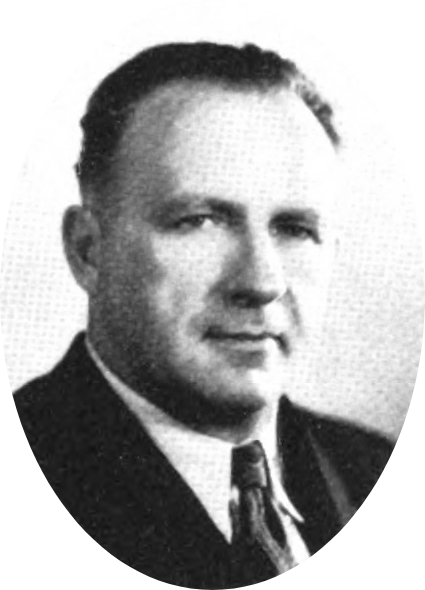
- Voigt c. 1942

Member of the California State Assembly from the 61st district
- In office January 7, 1935 – January 4, 1943
- Preceded by: Charles W. Dempster
- Succeeded by: Lester A. McMillan

Personal details
- Born: February 2, 1888 Waukesha, Wisconsin, U.S.
- Died: May 21, 1962 (aged 74) Inglewood, California, U.S.
- Resting place: Inglewood Park Cemetery
- Party: Socialist (before 1934); Democratic (after 1934)
- Spouse(s): Hattie Ludwig Martin (m. 1926; died 1944) Amelia
- Children: 3

Military service
- Allegiance: United States
- Branch/service: United States Navy
- Years of service: 1908–1912
- Rank: Commissary Steward
- Battles/wars: Banana Wars; Admiral Kimball Expedition

Ernest Otto Voigt (February 2, 1888 – May 21, 1962) was an American educator, realtor, plumber and politician who served in the California State Assembly for the 61st district from 1935 to 1943.

== Career ==
Voigt served in the U.S. Navy as a commissary steward from 1908 to 1912, during which he participated in the Admiral Kimball Expedition to Nicaragua.

Voigt was one of two dozen "EPIC Democrats" elected to the state legislature in 1934. Before his election, he was a member of the Socialist Party, running for Los Angeles's 15th City Council district in 1927. He was a childhood friend of Daniel Hoan, the Socialist mayor of Milwaukee.

During the 1936 Democratic Party presidential primaries, Voigt joined an EPIC slate nominally pledged to Upton Sinclair for president; they actually supported Franklin D. Roosevelt, but opposed U.S. Senator William Gibbs McAdoo, who headed the president's slate. The EPIC slate lost to Roosevelt's by a margin of eight to one.

In 1942, just months after the attack on Pearl Harbor, Voigt ran for reelection on a platform that highlighted his past support for defense spending. He was defeated in the Democratic primary by Los Angeles City School District supervisor Lester A. McMillan.

On April 3, 1943, Voigt was arrested after allegedly threatening to kill two people, Bonita West and Alphonso M. Davis. When Voigt and his car were searched, police found two pairs of brass knuckles, a .38 caliber pistol and a two-foot crowbar. Charged with carrying concealed weapons and attempted murder, Voigt pled guilty to the former and was sentenced to six months in a road camp.
