= John C. Packard =

American attorney and politician (1892–1956)

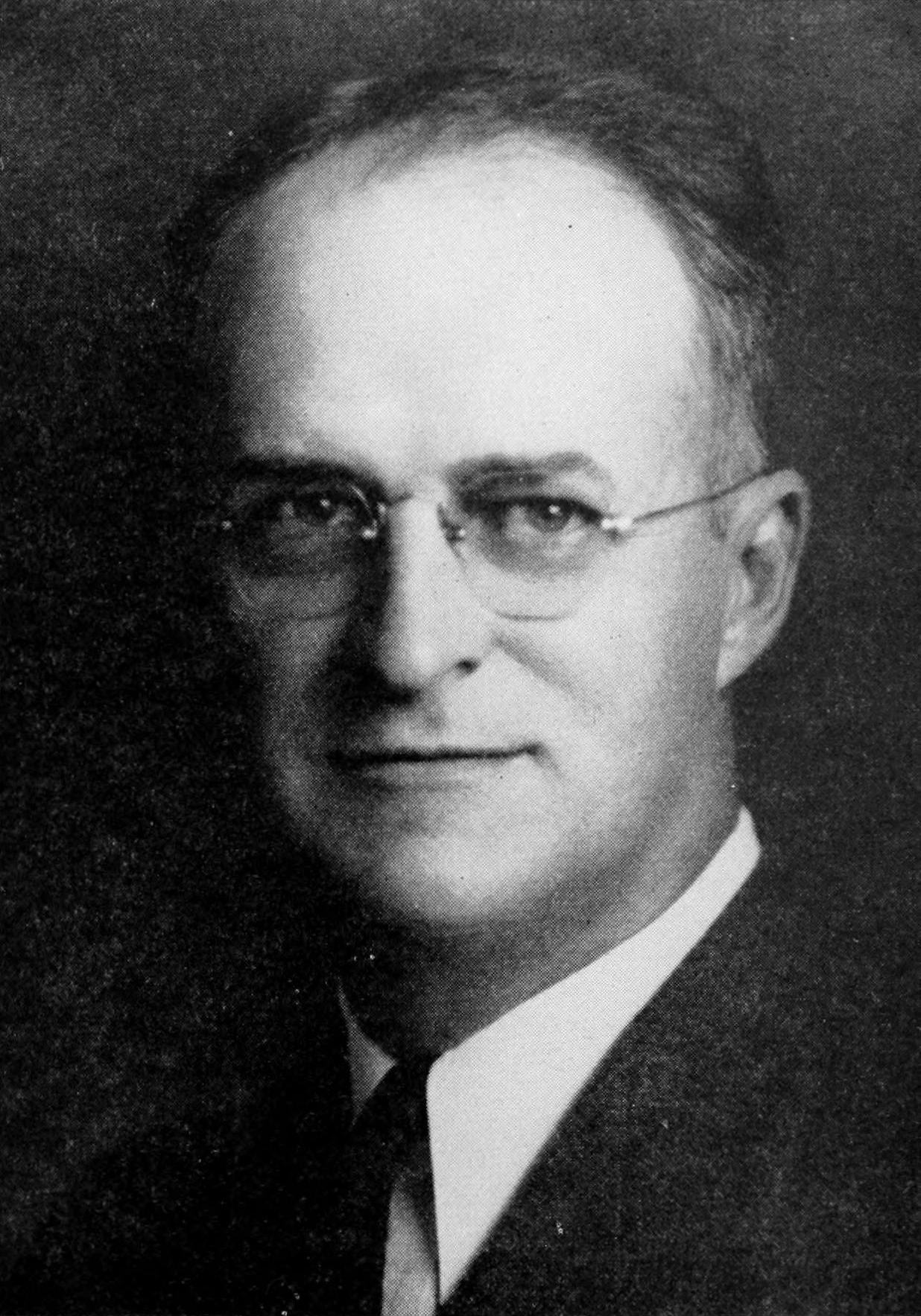
- Packard c. 1940

Chairman of the California Industrial Welfare Commission
- In office November 15, 1940 – August 27, 1947
- Preceded by: Archibald Young
- Succeeded by: Mae Carvell

Member of the California Industrial Welfare Commission
- In office February 24, 1939 – August 27, 1947
- Appointed by: Culbert Olson; Earl Warren
- Preceded by: C. C. Craig
- Succeeded by: Daniel E. Koshland Sr.

Personal details
- Born: November 1, 1892 Oak Park, Illinois, U.S.
- Died: July 28, 1956 (aged 63) Monrovia, California, U.S.
- Party: Socialist (before 1934); Democratic (after 1934)
- Spouse: Rose Marie Hutchinson (m. 1919)
- Children: John Jr.; Virginia
- Education: University of Southern California School of Law
- Occupation: Attorney, politician

Military service
- Allegiance: United States
- Branch/service: United States Army
- Battles/wars: World War I

John Cooper Packard (November 1, 1892 – July 28, 1956) was an American attorney and politician who served on the California Industrial Welfare Commission from 1939 to 1947, and as its chairman from 1940 to 1947. He was for many years an attorney for Upton Sinclair, and during the 1934 California gubernatorial election was part of the "inner circle of the EPIC campaign."

== Career ==
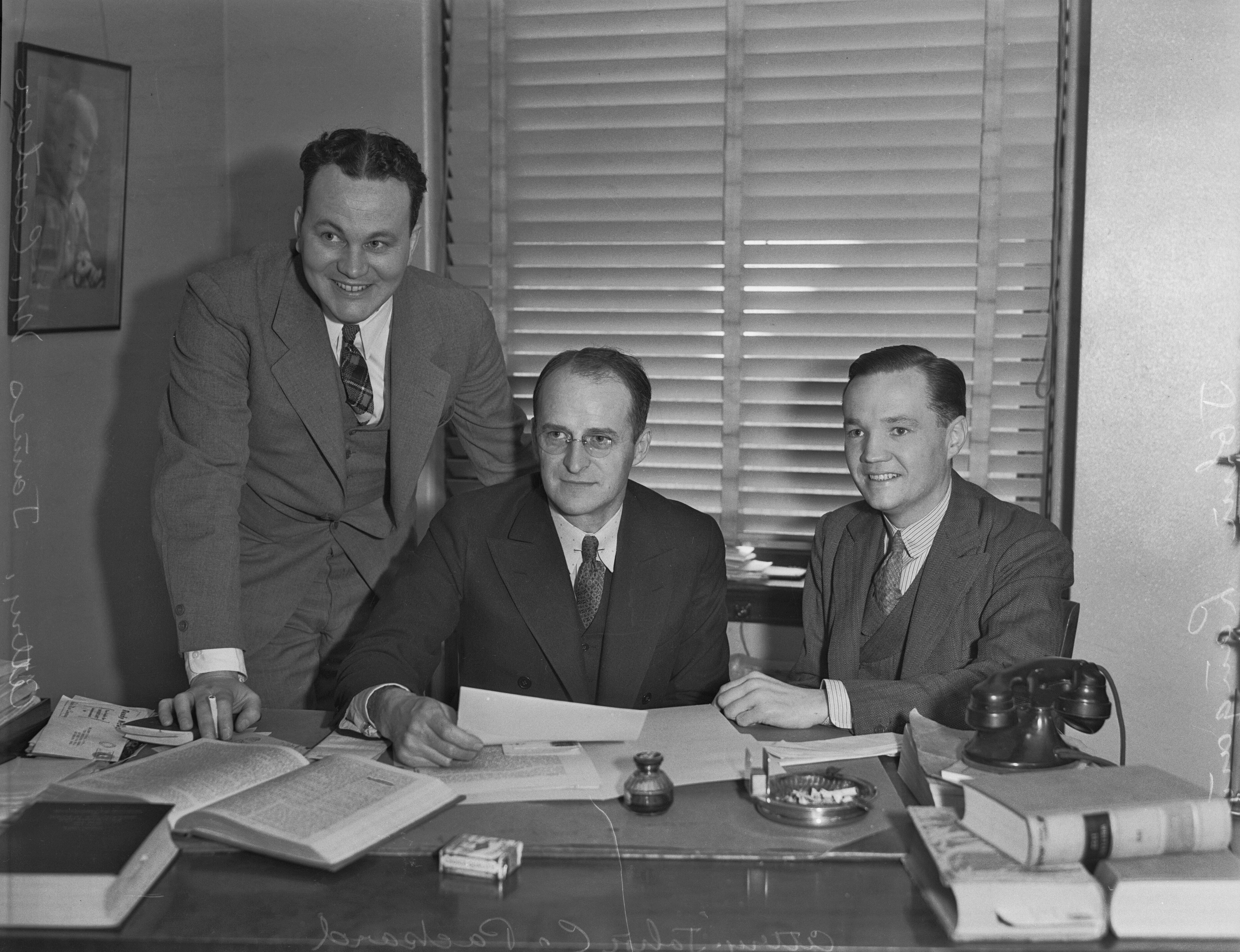
Attorneys John C. Packard (center) and James M. Carter (left) with miner John Langan (right) in Los Angeles, 1936

Packard entered politics as a Socialist; he was the party's candidate for State Assembly in the 67th district in 1914, coming in fourth place with 8.5% of the vote. In 1924, he was an unsuccessful candidate for presidential elector, pledged to Senator Robert M. La Follette. He was a delegate to the 17th National Convention of the Socialist Party in 1932, during which he was elected to its National Executive Committee. He was a member of the Party's Old Guard faction.

Packard was acquainted with Upton Sinclair as early as 1916, when the latter spoke at a Intercollegiate Socialist Society symposium hosted at the Packard home. The next year, the two men co-founded the Workers' Co-operative Association of Pasadena, with Packard as president and Sinclair as vice president. When Sinclair was arrested for reciting the Bill of Rights during the 1923 San Pedro maritime strike, Packard acted as one of his attorneys.

In 1933, Packard was approached by Sinclair to help him draft a political program for the 1934 gubernatorial election that would become the End Poverty in California plan. After Sinclair won the Democratic primary, Packard resigned from the National Executive Committee and left the Socialist Party to become a New Dealer. During the campaign, Packard secured a writ of prohibition from the California Supreme Court preventing the disenfranchisement of thousands of new Democratic voters.

Although Sinclair ultimately lost the election, Packard remained active in the Democratic Party. He was a candidate for Congress in 1936, but lost the Democratic primary to incumbent John S. McGroarty by a margin of 58% to 29%. Packard was later a delegate to the 1936 and 1940 Democratic National Conventions, and during the 1940 presidential election was chairman of the Roosevelt/Wallace campaign in Southern California.
