= Herbert Stanley Calvert =

Labor activist (1889–1981)

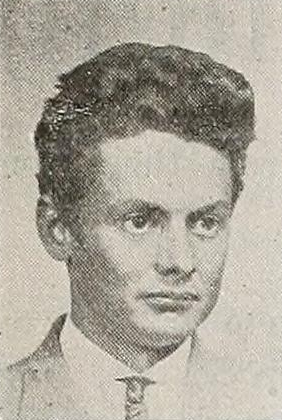
- Calvert c. 1914
- Born: April 6, 1889; Sonoma, California, U.S.
- Died: July 24, 1981 (aged 92); Los Angeles, California, U.S.
- Education: Illinois State University
- Occupation: Labor leader and activist
- Political party: Socialist
- Spouse: Mellie Miller (m. 1915)

Herbert Stanley Calvert (some sources incorrectly call him J. S. Calvert; April 6, 1889 – July 24, 1981) was an American labor activist who co-founded the Kuzbass Autonomous Industrial Colony in 1922.

== Biography ==
After graduating from high school, he studied at Illinois State University for a year. He then moved to New Mexico, where he worked as a farmer, carpenter, railroad worker, and traveling salesman. Having joined the Socialist Party of America, he became an ideological follower of Eugene Debs. In 1915, he married Mellie Miller, the daughter of one of the party's main sponsors, and together with his wife became an active participant in the Young People's Socialist League. In the early 1910s, the Calverts were among the founders of the socialist colony of Llano del Rio. With the outbreak of World War I, the Calverts joined a fairly large colony of anti-war American emigrants in Mexico. Here, under the influence of Vladimir Lenin's "Letters to the American Workers" distributed among the colonists, the Calverts joined the Industrial Workers of the World. After the war, Calvert returned to the United States and joined the Ford automobile plant in Detroit, learning about production organization and the technologies used at the plant.

In 1921, Calvert arrived in the USSR to participate in the founding congress of the Red International of Labor Unions. Once in Moscow, he took an active part in the creation of the Kuzbass Autonomous Industrial Colony. Together with Sebald Rutgers and Bill Haywood, the colony's other founders, he met with Lenin on September 19, who after this meeting in a note to Valerian Kuybyshev ordered that the group be given every possible assistance. However, a skeptical review of the group of American enthusiasts was then received from Ludwig Martens, who described Calvert as "unrespectable." After the decision to organize a colony in Kuzbass was made, Calvert went back to the United States in November of the same year to recruit workers for it.

In the United States, Calvert and his associates encountered significant difficulties, as they were denied support by both the Industrial Workers of the World (the organization had decided to break completely with the Bolsheviks and Soviet Russia, convinced that the Soviet system was incompatible with the ideals of syndicalism) and the Communist Party of America. Nevertheless, articles about Calvert's mission and interviews with him were published by several New York newspapers, and Calvert also secured the support of several prominent Americans, among them Stuart Chase, Thorstein Veblen, Charles Steinmetz, and Roger Nash Baldwin. Over the course of 1922, he sent about 300 colonists from the United States to Kuzbass, including several skilled engineers. However, by the end of the year, Soviet leadership revised the terms of the agreement with the American colonists, and as a result Calvert was dismissed from his post as head of the New York representative office. He returned with his wife to California, where he spent the rest of his life.

During the 1936 Democratic Party presidential primaries, Calvert joined an EPIC slate nominally pledged to Upton Sinclair for president; they actually supported Franklin D. Roosevelt, but opposed U.S. Senator William Gibbs McAdoo, who headed the president's slate. The EPIC slate lost to Roosevelt's by a margin of eight to one.

In 1973, Calvert and his wife wrote a memoir titled The Kuzbas Story: History of the Autonomous Industrial Colony Kuzbas. Their manuscript is available to specialists at the Wayne State University Library.

== Sources ==
- J.P. Morray. Project Kuzbas: American Workers in Siberia (1921–1926) – NY: International Publishers, 1983.
- J. S. Calvert // E. A. Ivanyan Encyclopedia of Russian-American Relations. XVIII-XX centuries.–Moscow: International Relations, 2001.–696 p.–ISBN 5-7133-1045-0.
