= Bill Busick =

American socialist (1904–1974)

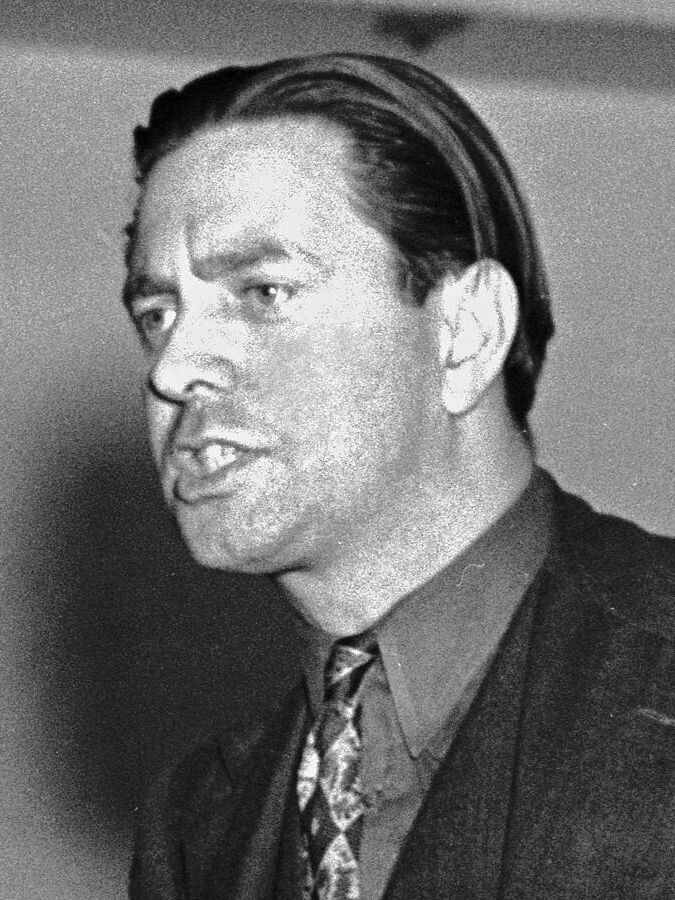
- Busick in 1937

Chairman of the Socialist Party of California
- In office September 27, 1930 – c. June 1932
- Preceded by: Cameron H. King
- Succeeded by: Chaim Shapiro

Personal details
- Born: May 26, 1904 Elyria, Ohio, U.S.
- Died: June 28, 1974 (aged 70) Alameda, California, U.S.
- Party: Socialist
- Education: Oberlin College
- Occupation: Labor organizer, restaurant owner

William Wesley Busick (May 26, 1904 – June 28, 1974) was an American labor organizer and Socialist Party functionary who served as state chairman of the Socialist Party of California from 1930 to 1932. He ran against Republican Clarence N. Wakefield for State Assembly in 1930, polling 38% of the vote, the best showing of any Socialist candidate in the state. He was one of the leaders of a 1937 sit-down strike at the Douglas Aircraft Company plant in Santa Monica.

Twenty years later Busick, now a restaurant owner and taxpayers' rights advocate, returned to politics when he ran a write-in campaign for governor of California in the 1966 election. Running as an independent Democrat, he presented himself as a protest vote against incumbent governor Pat Brown, who he claimed did not have the confidence of his party.

Fred Okrand, former legal director of the ACLU of Southern California, remembered Busick as "a dynamic speaker, very articulate, [who] carried himself very well."
