= Wilbur F. Gilbert =

American politician

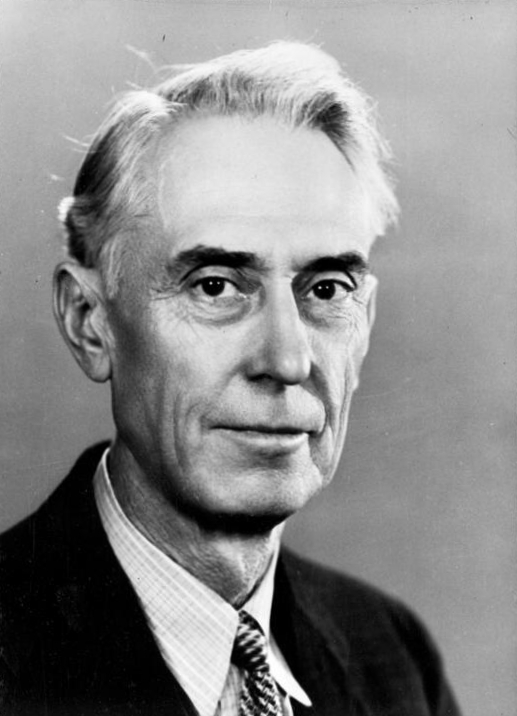
- Gilbert c. 1948

Member of the California State Assembly from the 54th district
- In office January 7, 1935 – January 6, 1941
- Preceded by: Frank J. Rogers
- Succeeded by: John B. Knight

Personal details
- Born: December 22, 1874; Rochester, Minnesota, U.S.
- Died: September 3, 1956 (aged 81); Los Angeles, California, U.S.
- Political party: Socialist (before 1934); Democratic (after 1934)
- Spouse: Rena
- Children: Dorothy
- Education: Dakota State University

Wilbur Fay Gilbert (December 22, 1874 – September 3, 1956) was an American engineer, merchant, political scientist, and politician who served in the California State Assembly for the 54th district from 1935 to 1941.

== Biography ==
Gilbert was one of two dozen "EPIC Democrats" elected to the state legislature in 1934. Before his election, he was a member of the Socialist Party, a fact which came to light during his campaign for reelection in 1938. He admitted his past political affiliation and was reelected with 58% of the vote, but retired two years later due to poor health. During his tenure, he authored disability pension legislation that was vetoed by governor Frank Merriam.

Gilbert returned to the political arena in 1948 to challenge incumbent assemblyman John L. E. Collier for his old seat. Boasting endorsements from the AFL, CIO, railroad brotherhoods, Southern California Businessmen's Association, and 54th Assembly District Democratic Club, Gilbert campaigned on lowering taxes and the cost of living. He was also an outspoken opponent of the Mundt–Nixon Bill. He ultimately came in second place with 30% of the vote.
