= 1936 Democratic National Convention =

U.S. political event held in Philadelphia, Pennsylvania

- 1936 presidential election
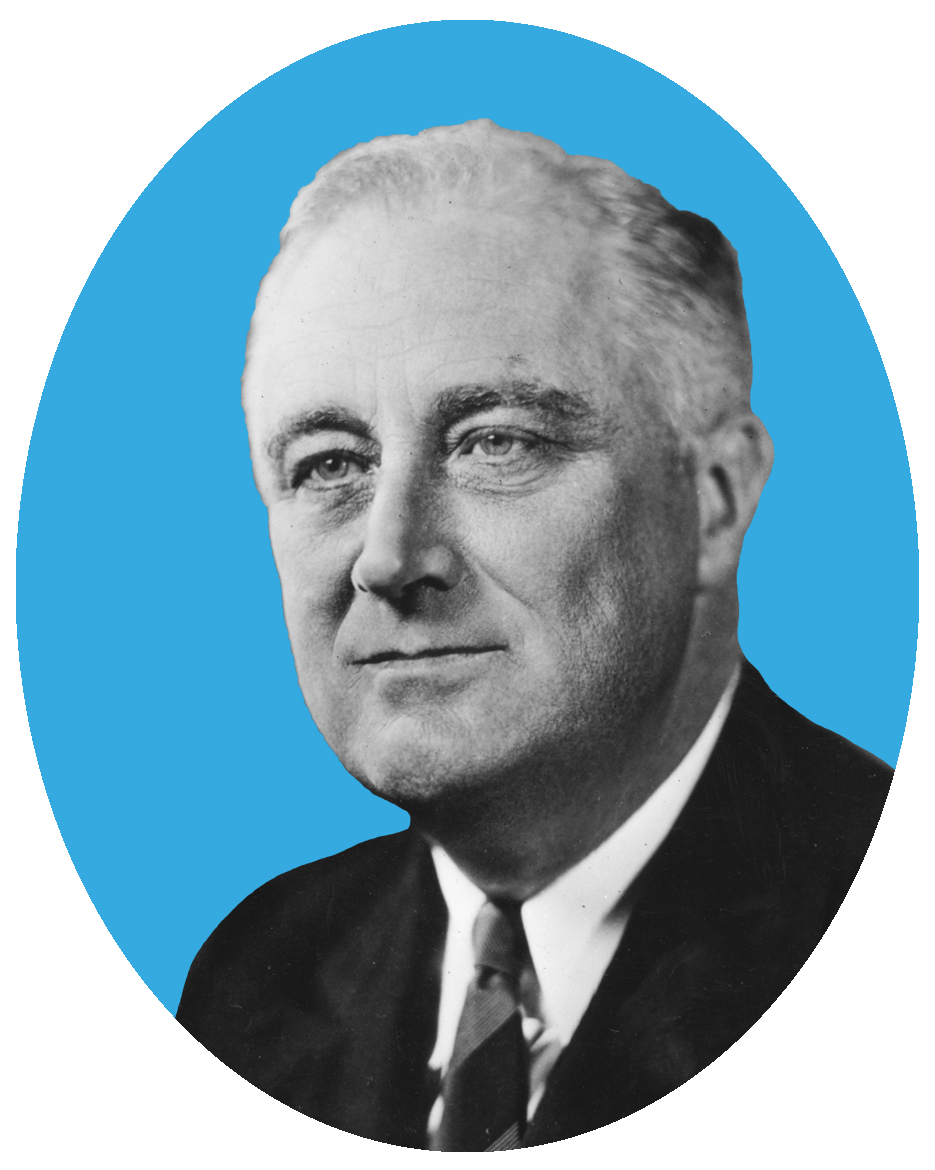
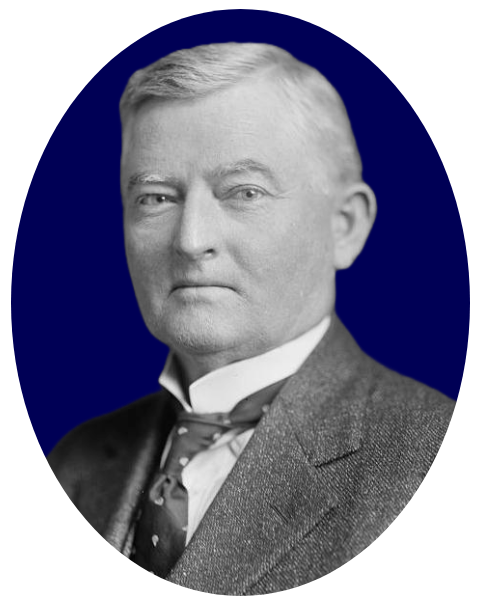
- Nominees; Roosevelt and Garner

Convention
- Dates: June 23–27, 1936
- City: Philadelphia, Pennsylvania
- Venue: Convention Hall; Franklin Field

Candidates
- Presidential nominee: Franklin D. Roosevelt of New York
- Vice-presidential nominee: John N. Garner of Texas

The 1936 Democratic National Convention was held in Philadelphia, Pennsylvania from June 23 to 27, 1936. The convention resulted in the nomination of President Franklin D. Roosevelt and Vice President John N. Garner for reelection.

== Changes to rules ==
At the 1936 Democratic Convention, the rule requiring candidates for president and vice president to have a majority of two-thirds of the delegates votes to win nomination, which had existed since 1832, was abolished.

Roosevelt had long pushed for the rule's abolition, in part due to past deadlocks: for example, the 1924 convention had required 103 ballots over roughly two weeks to nominate John W. Davis.

The conventioneers provided that a simple majority of delegates would be required to win nomination, allowing for candidates to more easily be nominated and thus produce less balloting. In this regard, only one Democratic Convention after 1932 has required multiple ballots (that of 1952, which required three).

This also began the decline of the South's influence at Democratic conventions, making it easier for the Democrats to begin adopting civil rights and other liberal ideas into their platforms, since the two-thirds rule had long given the South a de facto veto power on presidential nominees.

With the rule's abolition, Missouri Senator Bennett Champ Clark noted that "the Democratic Party is no longer a sectional party, it has become a great national party." Southern Democrats would continue to decline in power, ultimately leading to the Dixiecrat movement and Nixon's 1968 Southern strategy.

South Carolina Senator Ellison D. Smith walked out of the convention once he saw that a black minister, Marshall L. Shepard, was going to deliver the invocation.

== Results ==
The Balloting:

Democratic National Convention presidential vote, 1936
| Candidates | |
| Name | Franklin D. Roosevelt |
| Certified Votes | Voice Vote(100.00%) |
| Margin | 0 (0.00%) |

President Roosevelt and Vice President Garner were renominated by acclamation without need for a roll-call vote. There were concerns that Louisiana senator Huey Long might mount a primary challenge to President Roosevelt, however, this did not occur, due to his assassination by Carl Weiss in 1935.

In his acceptance speech on June 27 at the adjacent Franklin Field, Roosevelt remarked, "This generation of Americans has a rendezvous with destiny."

== See also ==
- History of the United States Democratic Party
- 1936 Democratic Party presidential primaries
- List of Democratic National Conventions
- United States presidential nominating convention
- 1936 Republican National Convention
- 1936 United States presidential election

| Preceded by 1932; Chicago, Illinois | Democratic National Conventions | Succeeded by 1940; Chicago, Illinois |
