= Kuzbass Autonomous Industrial Colony =

Soviet experiment in workers' control

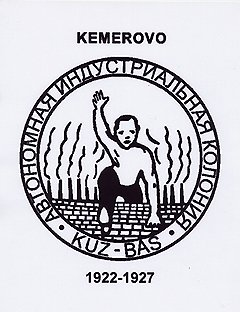
Seal of the Kuzbass AIC, which features a design inspired by Industrial Workers of the World artwork

The Kuzbass Autonomous Industrial Colony was an experiment in workers' control in the Soviet Union from 1922 to 1926 during the New Economic Policy. It was based in Shcheglovsk, Kuzbass, Siberia.

== History ==
=== Creation of the Autonomous Industrial Colony ===
Almost from the very beginning of its existence, the Soviet government considered it necessary to use foreign capital, knowledge and experience through the conclusion of concession agreements, which was reflected in the corresponding decision of the First All-Russian Congress of Soviets held in December 1917.

In 1921, the country began the "restoration of the national economy" with the New Economic Policy. The restoration of the heavy industry of Kuzbass was proclaimed one of the paramount tasks. At the Tenth Party Congress, Vladimir Lenin said that the fuel crisis had led to the need to spend gold on the purchase of coal from abroad.

Lenin, realizing that the economic crisis in Russia was too deep and that industry in the young Soviet Republic could not be restored on its own, wrote the "Letter to American Workers". In this letter, he called on workers of the Communist Parties of developed countries to help organize a new industrial base for the new workers' state. Foreign workers, mostly Americans, led by Sebald Rutgers, Bill Haywood, and Herbert Stanley Calvert, responded to the Soviet government. The response contained a proposal to establish a colony of foreign workers and specialists in Kuzbass. They met with Lenin in Moscow in September 1921. On behalf of the Industrial Workers of the World, this group expressed its desire to commission the Nadezhda Metallurgical Plant and part of the Kuznetsk Basin in Siberia and the Urals, to organize an industrial colony of American workers there.

The Kuzbass Society was created, in the United States, and it began recruiting volunteers to work in the colony. In March 1922, an announcement was published in a number of US communist publications: “Pioneers are needed for Siberia! .. For industrial construction ... to support the Russian Revolution and to show the world what free workers can do when their talent is not hindered by the profit system and when they themselves are the sole owners of the products of their labor." The negotiation process between representatives of the Soviet authorities and the American initiative group continued until the end of 1921.

The agreement between the Council of Labor and Defense (STO) and the board of colonists composed of Bill Haywood, Sebald Rutgers and others, on the creation of an autonomous industrial colony in Kuzbass, was signed on December 25, 1921, in Moscow. Under this agreement, the colonists received the disposal of a mine in the Kemerovo region, a plant still under construction and 10 thousand hectares of land for agricultural purposes. Foreigners, in turn, pledged to work in Russia for at least 2 years, live according to the laws of the RSFSR and obey all resolutions of the service station. The colonists pledged to restore all the enterprises transferred to them and to purchase the advanced equipment necessary for mines and production abroad. The Soviet government categorically insisted on the condition that all financing and supply of American workers would be carried out without raising funds from the Soviet budget. On the initiative of Lenin, the leaders and members of the colony had to pay a "subscription" and would collectively be responsible for ensuring that "only people who are capable and willing to consciously endure a series of severe deprivations, inevitably associated with the restoration of industry in a country that is very backward and ruined".

The American side, represented by Rutgers, categorically opposed the intervention of the Supreme Soviet of the National Economy in the affairs of the "autonomous industrial colony." Serious disagreements between the Soviet authorities (represented by Valerian Kuybyshev) and the autonomous workers, including on the financial conditions and the composition of the colony's organizing committee, subject to approval by the Labor and Defense Council, prevented practical steps to transfer Kuzbass to operation. In addition, a group of American enthusiasts received complaints from Ludwig Martens, who described Haywood as "only an agitator, semi-anarchist," and Rutgers as "a wonderful comrade and propagandist," but "hardly an administrator.".

=== Organization's activities ===
Foreigners examined many areas of Kuzbass (Novokuznetsk, Bachatsky, Guryevsk, Kiselyovsk, Kuznetsky). The Kemerovo Rudnik, in which there was the necessary infrastructure and labor resources, was considered the most suitable for the endeavor. The official registration of the AIC took place on December 22, 1922. At the first stage, the colony was handed the mines of the Kemerovo, by 1923 the Kolchuginsky, Prokopyevsky and Kiselevsky mines were added. At the same time, two representative offices of the AIC in New York City and Berlin opened, which were engaged in the search for workers for the colony and made purchases of equipment. The colony's activities were covered in the Kuzbass Bulletin regularly published in New York by the Kuzbass Society.

About 750 workers and specialists arrived from abroad to work at the AIC enterprises in the Kuznetsk basin. The national composition of the colonists was quite diverse, there were Americans, Finns, Germans, Yugoslavs, Russians (about 30 nationalities in total). While men were the majority, a significant number of the foreign colonists were women, who were drawn to the colony by its promises of gender equality and the freedom from 'Kitchen Slavery' the Soviet Union in general offered. Some, such as Ruth Kennedy, would come with their families, while others would come alone. Despite the fact that the basis of the colony was represented by foreigners, a significant percentage of the workers were Russian miners, their number was in the region of 5000 people. According to data, about 500 Americans were employed there, instead of the planned 3 thousand (in total, 560 foreigners worked in the colony). About 8 thousand people were employed at the colony enterprises by the end of 1923. In the official documents of the colony, there was no mention of the predominantly American composition of the volunteer contingent that worked in it, but in the press and even in official documents it often appeared under the name "American Colony". The colony was headed by Sebald Rutgers, who left this post in 1926 for health reasons. Kutkin, the Russian engineer who replaced Rutgers as the head of the AIC, turned the entire foreign colony against himself, which led to its gradual elimination.

The colonists, together with the Soviet government, sought to make the AIC an independent industrial unit in the Kuznetsk basin. Moreover, the AIC claimed the right of an exemplary enterprise, to which the rest should be equal. But the main task for foreigners was the restoration and development of the heavy coal industry of Kuzbass. The center of their activity was the Kemerovo region, where the main enterprises and the board of the entire organization were located. The "Kuzbass AIC" reconstructed a number of mines, built and put into production the first chemical processing plant in Russia and organized an advanced agricultural farm. Under the AIC, villages in the Kemerovo region were massively electrified and luxury districts were built in the cities of Kuzbass.

=== Life in the Colony ===
In the early days of the colony, nearly all of the day-to-day aspects of residents' lives were communally based: food, access to medicine, and other daily necessities were distributed equally among the residents, and all labour was wageless. Ruth Kennell would describe its organization in her personal journal: "The food is plentiful and well cooked, though the diet is too starchy...those who prefer to do their own cooking are given payocks (rations) for ten days. Soap and tobacco are rationed monthly. All colony members except children and mothers of infants must do useful work. In return the workers receive food, shelter, and certain winter clothing such as fur caps and gloves and felt boots. A community laundry launders ten pieces weekly for each worker. A shoe shop repairs shoes. We get along very nicely without money in Kuzbas Colony."

Despite this commitment to equality, however, tensions and discrepancies still arose between certain groups in the population. Industrial workers were the political majority, and had little patience for the white-collar residents, at one point voting to increase the working hours of office workers from eight to nine. Additionally, the gender roles which many of the women workers had hoped to escape would creep into daily life, as many were expected to take charge of household duties while simultaneously participating in colony work. There was also tension between the foreigners in general and the Russian residents, as each believed the other was receiving preferential treatment from the Soviet government.

Most of the communal aspects of colony life would come to an end with the institution of the New Economic Policy, as Kuzbass, along with all other Soviet enterprises, was expected to adopt a wage labour system in the name of increasing productivity. This would involve dividing the residents of the colony into seventeen different categories, a move which many of the white-collar workers believed would only widen the gap between the political power of the industrial workers and the white collar workers, in favour of the industrial workers. Many of the foreign workers saw this as a betrayal of communist values, and would return to their home countries in protest. Two of the departees, Ruth and Thomas Doyle, would go a step further, accusing the Soviet government of having 'scammed' them and making claims that they had been pressured to participate in 'free love' with the colony, with its Russian leadership attacking the idea of monogamy (a statement which all of the remaining colonists would refute).

=== Dissolution of the AIC ===
Despite its successes, the contract with AIC was terminated on December 28, 1926. The industrial colony paid off in the recovery period with its limited production size, but when industrialization began, the pace of development accelerated and the scale of industry expanded, the AIC could no longer maintain efficiency with its own special form of organization. In 1923, foreign experts, in particular Americans, began to be arrested and repressed, some were shot in the 1930s. A significant number of the American workers returned to the United States.

By 1931, the Kuzbass only had 25 colonists remaining in the region. Many of the former colonists stayed in the USSR and made careers elsewhere in the Soviet Union, often starting families and continuing their work in the mining sector. The Soviet encyclopedic reference books contain no mention of AIC and its noticeable contribution to the industrial development of Siberia.

== See also ==
- Industrial Workers of the World
