= Charles W. Dempster =

American politician (1879–1941)

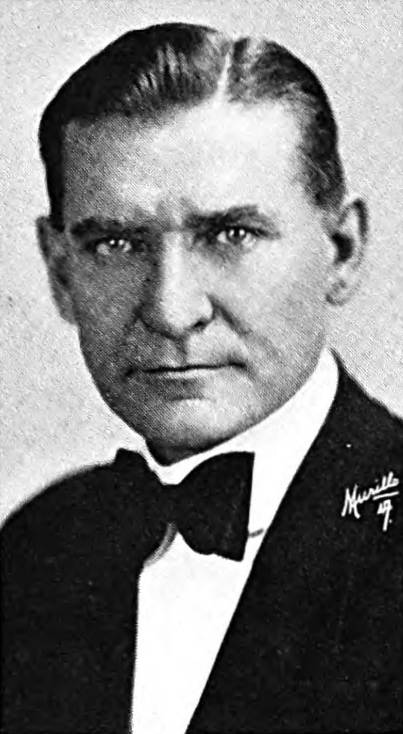
- Demptster in 1932

Member of the California State Assembly
- In office January 5, 1931 – January 7, 1935
- Preceded by: Issac Jones
- Succeeded by: Ernest O. Voigt
- Constituency: 57th district (1931–1933); 61st district (1933–1935)

Secretary of the Idaho State Senate
- In office January 1911 – January 1913

Member of the Montana House of Representatives
- In office January 1903 – January 1907

Personal details
- Born: August 24, 1879 Thurman, Iowa, U.S.
- Died: July 20, 1941 (aged 61) Los Angeles, California, U.S.
- Party: Republican; Labor
- Spouse: Grace
- Children: 4

Charles William Dempster (August 24, 1879 – July 20, 1941) was an American politician who served in three state legislatures, those of Montana, Idaho, and California.

== Personal life ==
Dempster was born on August 24, 1879, in Plum Hollow, Iowa, or Thurman, Iowa, the son of Barton W. Dempster and Alice May Gish. His family moved to Nebraska and Missouri, then to California, where his father died when the boy was age 10. The family moved to Idaho in 1891.

He spent his boyhood in Tehama County, California, and, having been attracted to Montana "by the high wages", in 1903–05 he was living in Silver Bow, Montana. He was in that state for six years, then returned to the family homestead in Soda Springs, Idaho. He engaged in "farming and several different lines of business". In 1912 he was living in Bannock County, Idaho.

In 1904, Dempster took the role of the Duke of Venice in a performance of William Shakespeare's The Merchant of Venice, presented by members of various labor unions. He was married to Grace Warner, an attorney.

Dempster died of a heart attack on July 20, 1941, while with a group of friends inspecting real estate on South Rimpau Avenue, Los Angeles. He was survived by his widow, Grace; and four sons, Charles W. Jr., Barton Warner, Wesley Frederick, and Thomas Lewis. At that time his address was 1660 West Boulevard

== Professional life ==
=== Career ===
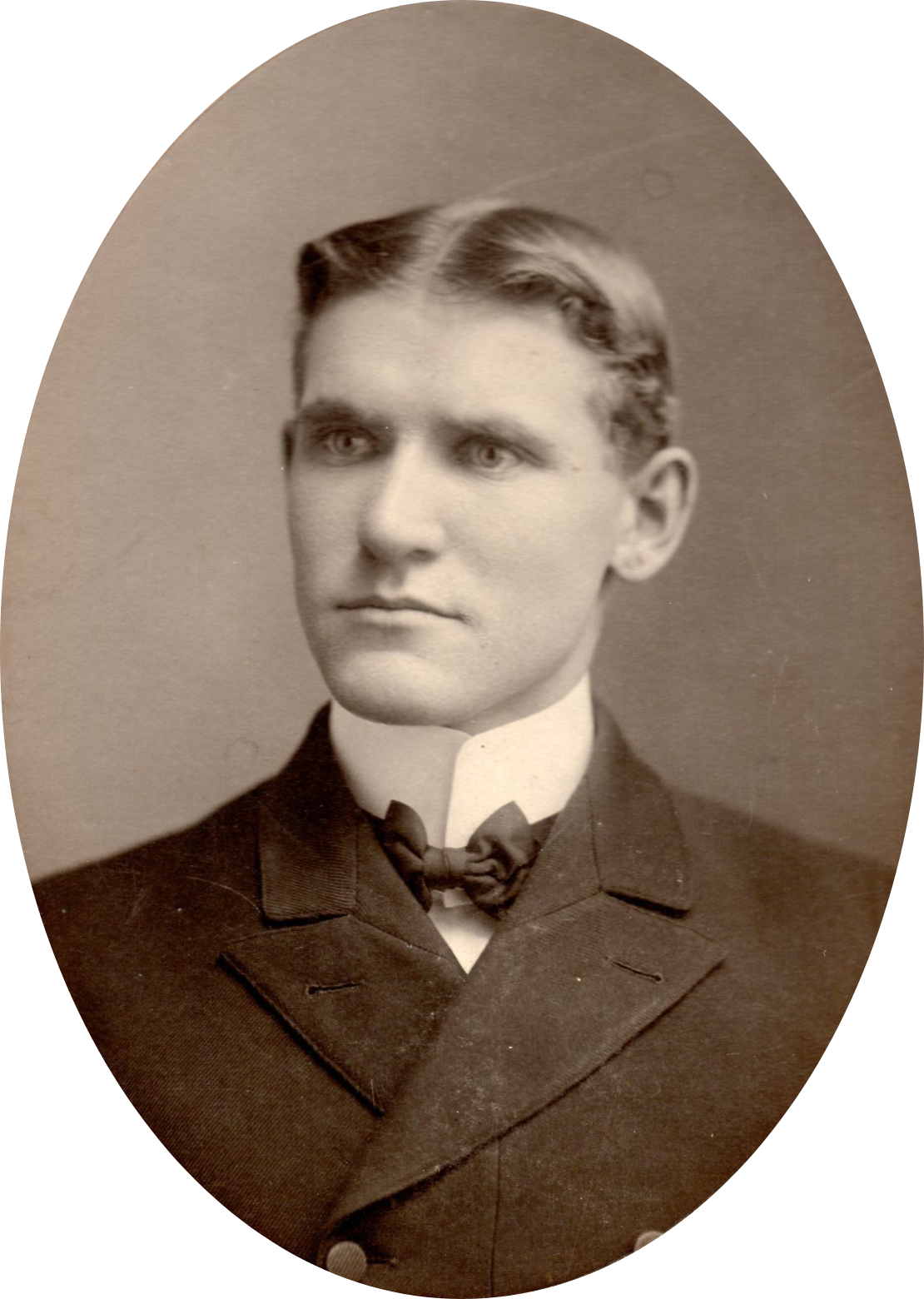
Dempster c. 1900s

In 1897, Dempster received his teacher's certificate in Bannock County, Idaho, and taught school "for several years". In 1903 he was "free employment agent" for the city of Anaconda, Montana, a position he resigned in June 1907.

He was twice elected on the Labor ticket to the Montana House of Representatives, the first time in 1903. In his first term, he was the youngest member of the House, and in his second campaign, he received the highest number of votes of any candidate on the ballot.

In 1903–1904, Dempster was president of the Butte Workingmen's Union.

His wife was his law partner.

In January 1905, Dempster introduced a bill to establish the use of whipping posts in Montana for the punishment of wife abusers and child abusers. He also introduced a bill "requiring street railway companies to provide a measure of protection for certain of their employees against inclement weather."

In 1910, Dempster was elected secretary of the Idaho State Senate. He ran for the Republican nomination for Idaho governor in 1912.

Dempster was nominated on the Republican ticket as a California Assembly candidate in August 1930, receiving a plurality vote over W. H. Lolllier, Raymond Tremaine, and Paul H. Bruns. He was elected "as a regular Republican" in the 57th District.

In June 1931, Dempster ran as a write-in candidate in the Los Angeles City Council District 11. Pencils stamped with the words "Write-in Charles W. Dempster" were found in and removed from election booths.

In 1932, he ran as a candidate in an election to recall Mayor John C. Porter. He placed second in a ten-person race, with 74,069 votes to Porter's 168,294 (1,653 precincts of 1,744).

In 1934, Dempster ran for Congress against incumbent Democrat John F. Dockweiler, but was defeated in the primary 50% to 36%.

In 1935 he ran as the EPIC-endorsed candidate in the Los Angeles City Council District 5. He lost to incumbent Byron B. Brainard.

=== Political stands ===
In Montana, Dempster "championed women suffrage, legislation on behalf of labor, and other forward-looking measures." In Los Angeles, he was known as a "staunch progressive" who favored municipal ownership of water and power resources.

In Los Angeles, he turned down an invitation to a yacht party for Republican candidates for the Legislature, sponsored by Southern California Edison, on the grounds that "I could not accept the hospitality of anybody who might be interested in some official act that I might be called upon to perform."

He sponsored Assembly Bill 1630 in 1931 which would have forbidden a married woman from teaching in a school or taking any civil service examination.

=== Fraternal Brotherhood ===
In 1906, Dempster "as an outsider" became active in the affairs of the Fraternal Brotherhood, a life-insurance and lodge organization. That resulted in "eleven years of internal strife for control" at the climax of which Dempster drew a .38-caliber automatic revolver from a desk drawer and, backing into a corner, held the Supreme Council [of the organization] at bay for ten minutes. He was finally disarmed by private detectives and arrested on the charge of disturbing the peace. In a criminal case for carrying a deadly weapon, Dempster was found not guilty.

The brotherhood next put Dempster "on trial" for misconduct in what the Los Angeles Times in 1917 called a "remarkable drama" that had occupied the 23,000-member Brotherhood for "almost a decade".

Next, in a civil suit against the organization, he claimed he had been unjustly arrested at that meeting. He said he had aroused the opposition of some board members because he tried to install a merit system in employment and prevent waste in the lending of funds. He sought reinstatement in his old job. In October 1920 he lost the case, "although he made a stirring personal plea to the jury that brought tears to the eyes of many listeners", according to the Los Angeles Evening Express.
