= 1936 Democratic Party presidential primaries =

Selection of the Democratic Party nominee

- March 10 to May 19, 1936

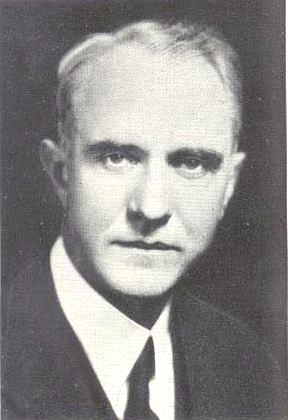
Candidate	Franklin D. Roosevelt	Henry Skillman Breckinridge
Home state	New York	New York
Contests won	13	1
Popular vote	4,814,978	136,407
Percentage	92.9%	2.6%
- Results map by state.
Previous Democratic nominee
Franklin D. Roosevelt
Democratic nominee
Franklin D. Roosevelt

From March 10 to May 19, 1936, voters of the Democratic Party elected delegates to the 1936 Democratic National Convention for the purpose of selecting the party's nominee for president in the 1936 United States presidential election. Incumbent President Franklin D. Roosevelt was selected as the nominee through a series of primary elections and caucuses culminating in the 1936 Democratic National Convention held from June 23 to June 27, 1936, in Philadelphia, Pennsylvania.

== Candidates ==
Initially, Roosevelt faced serious competition from Louisiana Senator Huey Long. Long was subsequently assassinated, after which Roosevelt faced only one primary opponent other than various favorite sons.

Franklin D. Roosevelt	Henry Skillman Breckinridge	Upton Sinclair	John S. McGroarty	Al Smith
U.S. President (1933–1945)	Assistant Secretary of War (1913–1916)	Novelist and Journalist from California	Representative from California (1935–1939)	Governor of New York (1919–1920, 1923–1928)
4,830,730 votes	136,407 votes	106,068 votes	61,391 votes	8,856 votes

== Primaries ==
		Franklin; Roosevelt	Henry; Breckinridge	Upton; Sinclair	John; McGroarty	Joseph; Coutremarsh	Uncommitted	Others
March 10	New Hampshire (Primary)	100.00% (15,752)	-	-	-	-	-	-
April 7	Wisconsin (Primary)	99.96% (401,773)	-	-	-	-	-	0.04% (154)
April 14	Illinois (Primary)	99.97% (1,416,411)	-	-	-	-	-	0.03% (446)
April 14	Nebraska (Primary)	100.00% (139,743)	-	-	-	-	-	-
April 28	Massachusetts (Primary)	85.85% (W) (51,924)	-	-	-	-	-	14.15% (W) (8,556)
April 28	Pennsylvania (Primary)	95.32% (720,309)	4.68% (35,351)	-	-	-	-	-
May 4	Maryland (Primary)	83.45% (100,269)	15.11% (18,150)	-	-	-	1.45% (1,739)	-
May 5	California (Primary)	82.51% (790,235)	-	11.08% (106,068)	6.41% (61,391)	-	-	-
May 5	South Dakota (Primary)	100.00% (48,262)	-	-	-	-	-	-
May 12	Ohio (Primary)	93.98% (514,366)	6.02% (32,950)	-	-	-	-	-
May 12	West Virginia (Primary)	97.25% (288,799)	-	-	-	2.75% (8,162)	-	-
May 15	Oregon (Primary)	99.77% (88,305)	-	-	-	-	-	0.24% (208)
May 19	New Jersey (Primary)	18.94% (W) (11,676)	81.04% (49,956)	-	-	-	-	0.02% (14)
June 6	Florida (Primary)	89.67% (242,906)	-	-	-	10.33% (27,982)	-	-

Legend:	1st place (popular vote)	2nd place (popular vote)	3rd place (popular vote)	Candidate has Withdrawn or Ceased Campaigning	(W) - Votes are Write-In

== See also ==
- 1936 Republican Party presidential primaries
- White primary
