= Charles Merriam =

Charles Merriam may refer to:

- Charles Edward Merriam (1874–1953), American professor of political science
- Charles W. Merriam (1877–1961), American insurance businessman and politician from New York
- Charles Merriam, founded G & C Merriam Co. with his brother, now Merriam-Webster
