= Judge Lemmon =

Judge Lemmon may refer to:

- Dal Millington Lemmon (1887–1958), judge of the United States Court of Appeals for the Ninth Circuit
- Mary Ann Vial Lemmon (born 1941), judge of the United States District Court for the Eastern District of Louisiana
