= Judge Welsh =

Judge Welsh may refer to:

- George Austin Welsh (1878–1970), judge of the United States District Court for the Eastern District of Pennsylvania
- Martin Ignatius Welsh (1882–1953), judge of the United States District Court for the Northern District of California
