= Charles Edward Merriam =

American political scientist (1874–1953)

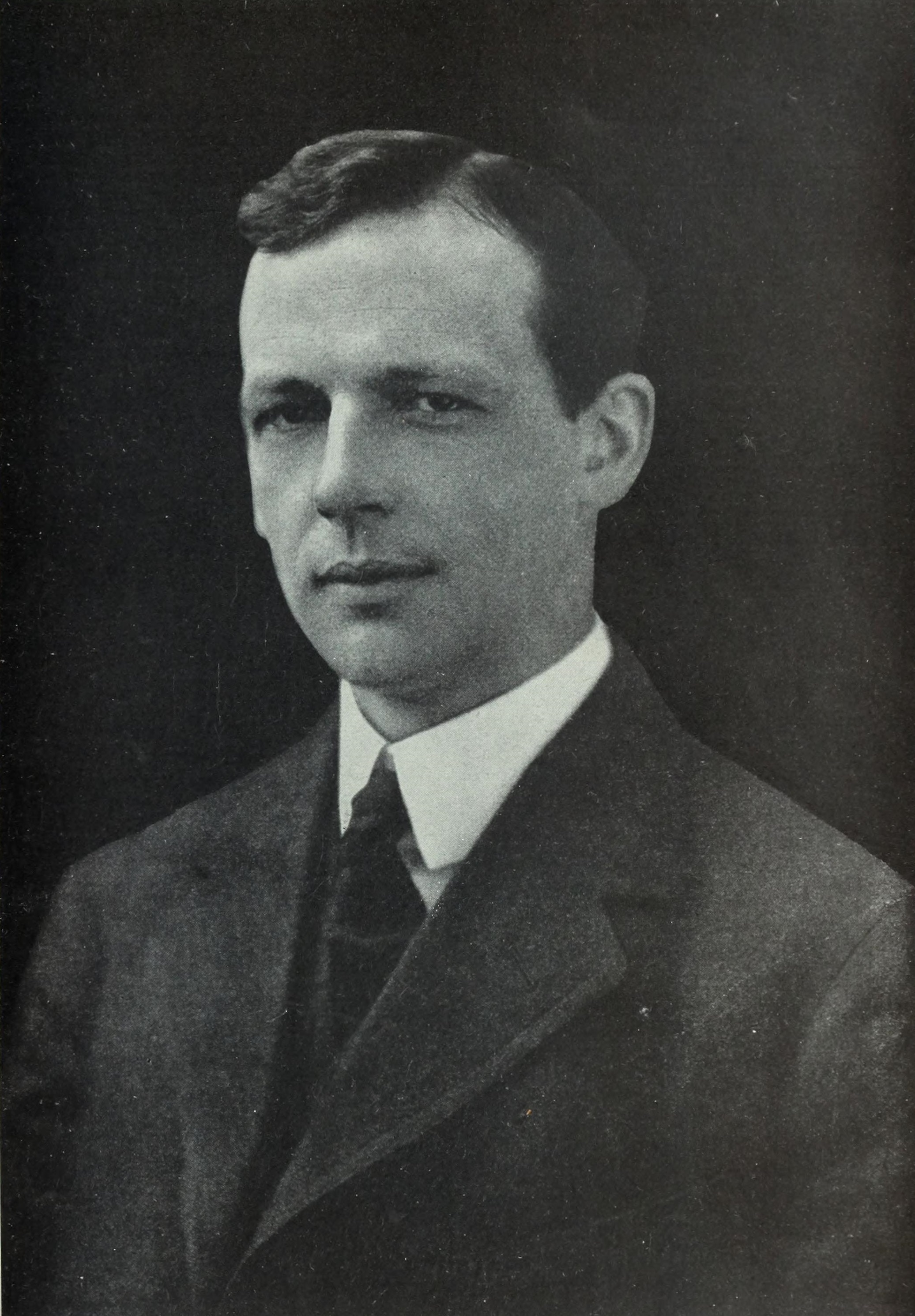
- Merriam c. 1910
- Born: Charles Edward Merriam Jr. November 15, 1874; Hopkinton, Iowa, U.S.
- Died: January 8, 1953 (aged 78); Rockville, Maryland, U.S.
- Known for: Development of behavioralism; service on the Brownlow Committee
- Spouse: Elizabeth Hilda Doyle (m. 1900)
- Children: 4, including Robert E. Merriam

Academic background
- Education: Lenox College; University of Iowa; Columbia University
- Thesis: History of the Theory of Sovereignty Since Rousseau (1900)
- Academic advisor: John Burgess
- Influences: Otto von Gierke; Frank Johnson Goodnow; Hugo Preuß; James Harvey Robinson; Edwin R. A. Seligman

Academic work
- Discipline: Political science
- Institutions: University of Chicago
- Doctoral students: V. O. Key Jr.; Harold Lasswell
- Notable ideas: Behavioralism
- Influenced: Jerome Frank; Herbert A. Simon

Charles Edward Merriam Jr. (Note: Pronounced /ˈmɛriəm/.) (November 15, 1874 – January 8, 1953) was an American professor of political science at the University of Chicago, founder of the behavioral approach to political science, a trainer of many graduate students, a prominent intellectual in the Progressive Movement, and an advisor to several US Presidents. Upon his death, The New York Times called him "one of the outstanding political scientists in the country".

== Early life and education ==
Charles Merriam was born in Hopkinton, Iowa, on November 15, 1874, to Charles Edward Merriam and Margaret Campbell Kirkwood Merriam. The Merriams traced their lineage to colonists who settled in Massachusetts in 1638. The father moved to Iowa in 1855, and served with the 12th Iowa Infantry Regiment in the American Civil War. Charles and Margaret (both Presbyterians) were married in 1868. Charles E. Merriam Sr. owned a dry goods store and was postmaster and president of the school board in Hopkinton. Charles Jr.'s elder brother was John C. Merriam (who became a noted paleontologist), and he had a younger sister, Susan Agnes Merriam.

Merriam attended public school in Hopkinton. He graduated from Lenox College in 1893 (his father was a trustee of the school), taught school for a year, and then returned to college to receive his Bachelor of Laws degree from the University of Iowa in 1895. He received his master's degree in 1897 and Doctor of Philosophy degree in 1900 from Columbia University. He studied in Paris and Berlin in 1899 while completing his PhD. Among his mentors from whom he adopted much of his early political thought were Frank Johnson Goodnow, Otto von Gierke, and James Harvey Robinson.

He married Elizabeth Hilda Doyle (of Constable, New York) in 1900.

== Career ==
=== Academic career and contributions ===
Merriam joined the faculty at the University of Chicago in 1900 as the first member of the political science faculty. He authored A History of American Political Theories in 1903, a notable analysis of American political movements which strongly supported the emerging Progressive movement. He moved up quickly in the department, reached the rank of full Professor in 1911, and served as chairman of the department of political science from 1911 until his retirement. From 1907 to 1911, he served as chairman of the College of Commerce and Administration (the precursor to the Booth School of Business).

Merriam significantly influenced the discipline of political science in the United States during his years in academia. As two political scientists noted in their study of the discipline in 1985, "Merriam's hand can be seen in virtually every facet of modern political science." "As much as any single scholar during this period, Merriam set the standard for how American democracy should be studied within the academy" was the assessment of Merriam's thinking on the discipline by another political scientist in 2008. The political scientist Gabriel Almond concluded, "The Chicago school is generally acknowledged to have been the founding influence in the history of modern political science, and Charles E. Merriam is generally recognized as the founder and shaper of the Chicago school."

Merriam was a leading advocate of the use of data and quantitative analysis in the practice of political science (even though he himself had almost no training in mathematics or statistics), and he founded the behavioralistic approach to political science. Merriam "denied the utility of theory" and advocated instead a "practical" political science aimed at creating a more harmonious, democratic, and pluralistic society. A corollary to this thinking was his "vision of social scientists as technical advisors to society's political leaders."

Merriam also deeply influenced the administration of political science in academia. He assembled a faculty that represented some of the best scholars of the day, and he and the faculty produced some of the brightest political scientists of the next generation, creating a department that dominated the discipline for 30 years. His influence was such that the department's structure, personnel, and reputation largely did not survive his retirement in 1940. He also pushed the discipline to move away from European-style theoretical discussion and into actual research, and he established the first social science interdisciplinary research institutes in the United States. He was also a leader in pursuing private grants and foundation money as a means of funding this research. According to Harold Lasswell, Merriam also promoted use of concepts from psychology to the field of political science.

Merriam was a critic of the states system in the United States. He argued that the states system was a problem for cities, as the state governments neither governed the cities nor allowed the cities to govern themselves.

=== Local political career ===
Merriam was a member of the Chicago City Charter Convention of 1906. He was commissioned by the City Club of Chicago in 1906 to study Chicago's tax system, and later served as a vice president of that influential organization. He served as a Chicago City Council alderman from the old 7th ward from 1909 to 1911, winning office (in part) due to the success of his 1903 textbook. He served on two key committees (Crime and Finance), and also served on three important city commissions (City Expenditures, Harbor, and Waste). While serving on the Harbor Commission, he became acquainted with Frederic Delano, uncle of Franklin D. Roosevelt.

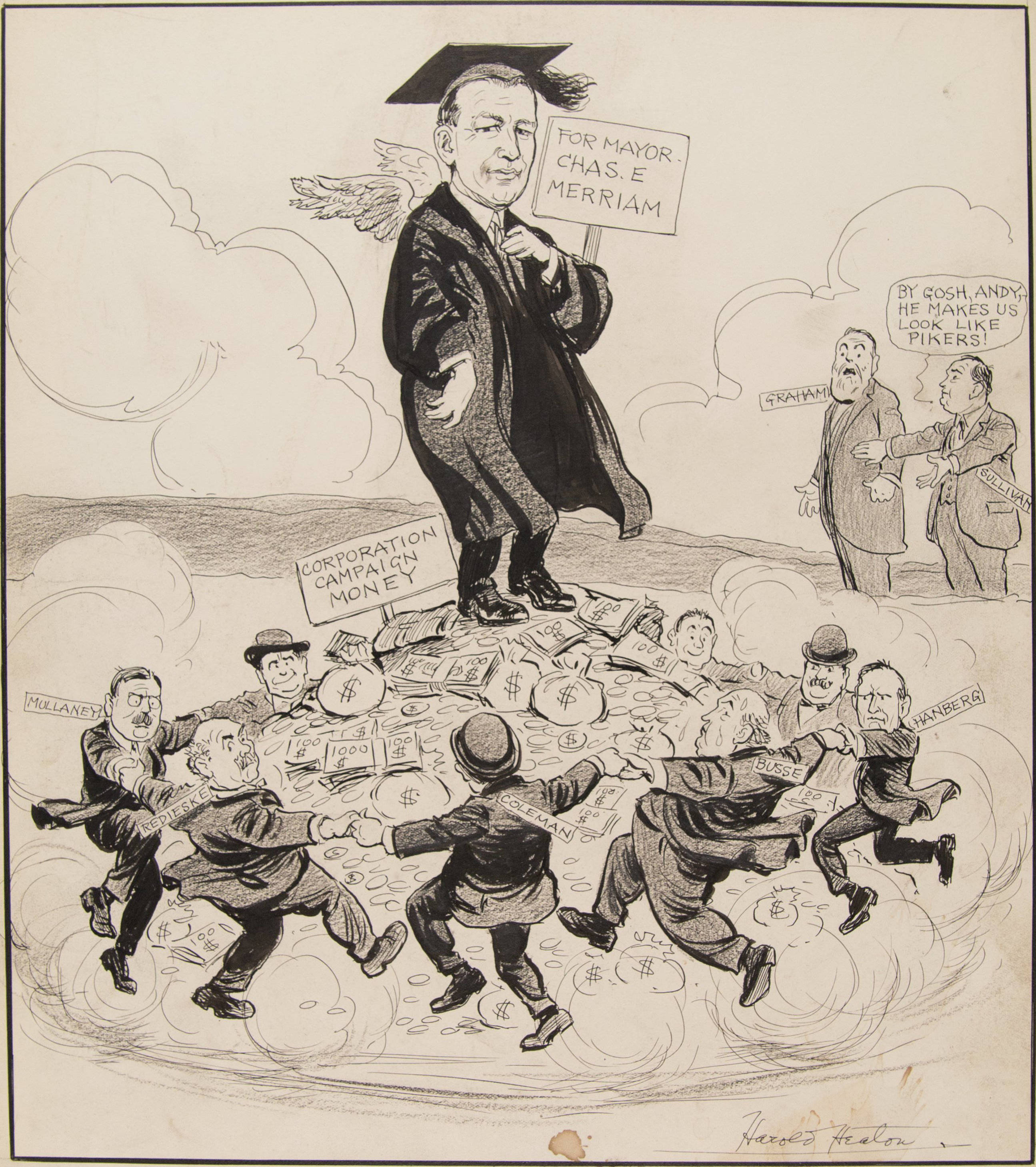
"FOR MAYOR CHAS. E MERRIAM" Charles Edward Merriam campaign cartoon

He left office in 1911 to run (unsuccessfully) as a Republican for Mayor of Chicago. His campaign manager was Harold Ickes. Although he won the Republican primary by a very wide margin, he narrowly lost the general election to Carter Harrison IV Merriam and Ickes helped co-found the Illinois Progressive Party, and they supported Robert M. La Follette for president until Theodore Roosevelt defeated him for the Progressive Party nomination. He campaigned for former President Theodore Roosevelt under the "Bull Moose" ticket in 1912. He again served as an alderman from the 7th ward from 1913 to 1917, albeit as an Independent rather than a Republican. In 1916, he established the Bureau of Public Efficiency, a private organization which helped establish many quasi-public corporations and organized the Chicago Park District. Merriam lost his bid for re-election as alderman after being defeated in the Republican primary by just five votes in 1917. He unsuccessfully ran again for mayor in 1919, losing the Republican primary to incumbent William Hale Thompson.

=== Federal service ===
Charles E. Merriam was an advisor to several presidents, and had a lengthy career in federal service. In 1911, President William Howard Taft offered him a seat on the Commission on Economy and Efficiency, a body established under the authority of the Civil Appropriations Act of 1910 to study the administration of the executive branch, but Merriam declined. In 1917, President Woodrow Wilson asked him to serve on the newly formed Tariff Commission (now the United States International Trade Commission), but again he declined federal service.

Merriam in uniform, 1918

During World War I, the 43-year-old Merriam joined the US Army Signal Corps, was commissioned a captain, and served on the federal government's Aviation Examining Board for the Chicago region. He was also on the federal government's Committee on Public Information, an independent government agency created to influence US public opinion and encourage American participation in World War I. From April to September 1918, he was American High Commissioner for Public Information in Rome, Italy, where he developed propaganda designed to sway Italian public opinion. His mission was not only to encourage the Italian public to keep Italy in the war on the Allied side but also to undermine support for socialist and communist political parties. He may even have used Rockefeller Foundation money to help convince socialist leader Benito Mussolini to support the war. During his time in Rome, however, Merriam usurped the prerogatives of the US ambassador and embassy staff, and his repeated clashes caused him to be sent back to the United States after just six months in the post. Merriam claimed to be deeply shaken by his experiences in Italy, although he did not make clear in what way his views had changed. He also engaged in an extramarital affair while overseas, which led to marital problems.

Back in Chicago, Merriam coordinated and edited a series of comparative studies by political scientists on the use of expertise in policy making, civic education, and public opinion. Merriam's contribution to the series, The Making of Citizens (1934), was highly laudatory of Soviet Russia, Nazi Germany, and Fascist Italy's use of these tools to strengthen the sense of national purpose and achieve policy goals. Merriam was highly critical of these regimes, though, and felt that a more scientific approach would avoid the messianism on which these governments relied and strengthen democratic and pluralistic norms.

He co-founded the Local Community Research Committee (LCRC) in 1923 with money from the Laura Spelman Rockefeller Memorial Foundation, he set up programs to collecting data on urban problems, and disseminating current policy ideas. He also helped organize the Social Science Research Council (an outgrowth of the LCRC) in 1923 with a grant from the Rockefeller Foundation, and served as its first president in 1924. In 1929, he co-founded (again, with a grant from the Spelman Rockefeller Memorial Foundation) the Public Administration Clearing House, an umbrella group which fostered collaboration and communication among associations in the field of public administration.

Merriam served as president of the American Political Science Association in 1925. That same year, he authored the book New Aspects of Politics, which called for marshalling the resources of political science research in a search for solutions to pressing social issues.

Merriam returned to government service in 1929, serving as vice chairman on President Herbert Hoover's President's Research Committee on Social Trends (PRCST). A landmark federal research initiative into demographics and emerging social issues, the PRCST "altered the direction and use of social science research in the United States."

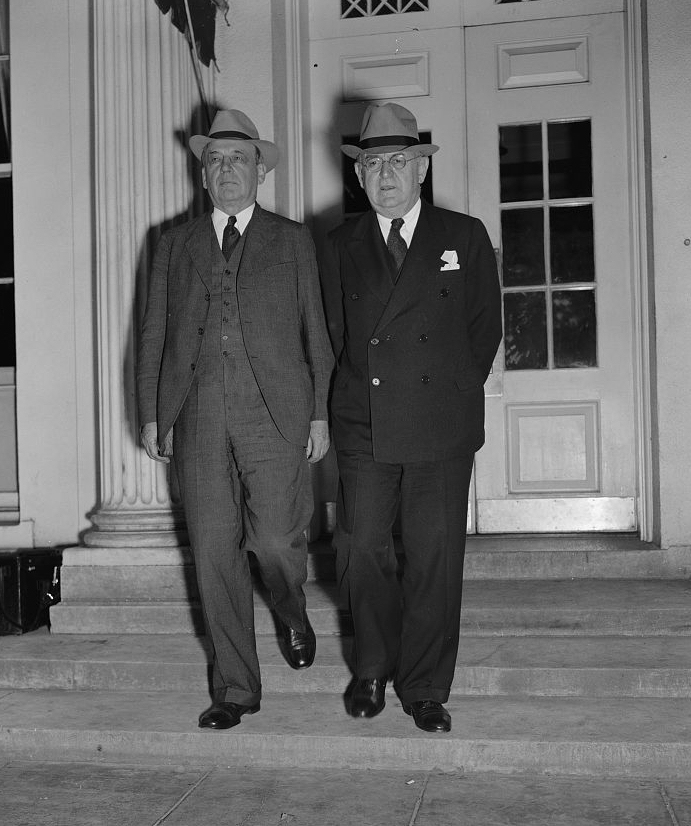
Charles Merriam (left) and Louis Brownlow at the White House, September 23, 1938

His relationship with Ickes allowed him to continue his service in the nation's capital under President Franklin D. Roosevelt. During the Great Depression, he was considered the country's most influential political scientist. In July 1933, Harold Ickes (now United States Secretary of the Interior) appointed Merriam to serve on the National Planning Board (and its successors, the National Resources Board and the National Resources Planning Board) Merriam was the body's most influential member. In this capacity, he helped draft proposals for an expansive welfare state. Although President Roosevelt approved of the plans and proposed implementing them in his "Four Freedoms" speech of January 6, 1941, the proposals were politically not viable and were never adopted.

In 1934, Merriam served on the Commission of Inquiry on Public Service Personnel, a research group established by the Social Science Research Council to research, analyze, and make proposals regarding the federal civil service and civil service reform (with an eye to the innovations made by the Tennessee Valley Authority). The body was funded by the Spelman Rockefeller Memorial Foundation, and Luther Gulick was the Commission's research director. The group made a number of important proposals regarding civil service reform, although not all were adopted. It did spark interest in the merit system, and many of its civil service reform proposals were adopted by several states.

Merriam believed that part of the success or failure of the National Planning Board's proposals depended on the administrative capacity of the executive branch to adopt and push for the recommended policies. Therefore, Merriam began lobbying President Roosevelt for a commission to study the structure and functions of the executive. Roosevelt was very receptive to the idea. The Supreme Court had struck down the National Industrial Recovery Act (a key legislative accomplishment of the New Deal) in Schechter Poultry Corp. v. United States, 295 U.S. 495 (1935), and significantly limited the president's power to remove members of independent executive agencies in Panama Refining Co. v. Ryan, 293 U.S. 388 (1935). Merriam assured the president that if he established a committee to review the administration of the executive branch, the committee's report could be written in such a way as to justify the president's reorganization goals while couching them in the neutral language of academic research. On March 22, 1936, Roosevelt established the Committee on Administrative Management (commonly known as the Brownlow Committee) and charged it with developing proposals for reorganizing the executive branch. Besides himself, the three-person committee consisted of Louis Brownlow, and Luther Gulick. On January 10, 1937, the committee released its report. Famously declaring "The President needs help," the committee's report advocated a strong chief executive, including among its 37 recommendations significant expansion of the presidential staff, integration of managerial agencies into a single presidential office, expansion of the merit system, integration of all independent agencies into existing Cabinet departments, and modernization of federal accounting and financial practices.

== Retirement and death ==
Charles Merriam retired from the University of Chicago in 1940, at the age of 66.

He was the last director of the Lucy Spelman Rockefeller Memorial Fund, acting in that capacity from 1940 until its merger with the Rockefeller Foundation in 1949.

Charles Merriam died on January 8, 1953, at Hilltop Hospital in Rockville, Maryland, after a long illness. He was survived by his daughter and three sons. He is buried at Arlington National Cemetery.

The University of Illinois picks a distinguished academic to honor with the Charles E. Merriam Award for Outstanding Public Policy Research.

== Notable works ==
Merriam was a prolific author during his lifetime. Some of his more notable works include:

- A History of American Political Theories. New York: MacMillan, 1903.
- American Political Ideas: Studies in the Development of American Political Thought, 1865–1917. New York: Macmillan. 1920.
- The American Party System: An Introduction to the Study of Political Parties in the United States. New York: MacMillan, 1922.
- Non-Voting: Causes and Methods of Control. Chicago: The University of Chicago Press, 1924.
- New Aspects of Politics. Chicago: University of Chicago Press, 1925.
- The Making of Citizens: A Comparative Study of Methods of Civic Training. Chicago: University of Chicago Press, 1931.
- Civic Education in the United States. New York: Scribner, 1934.
