= 1930 California lieutenant gubernatorial election =

- November 4, 1930
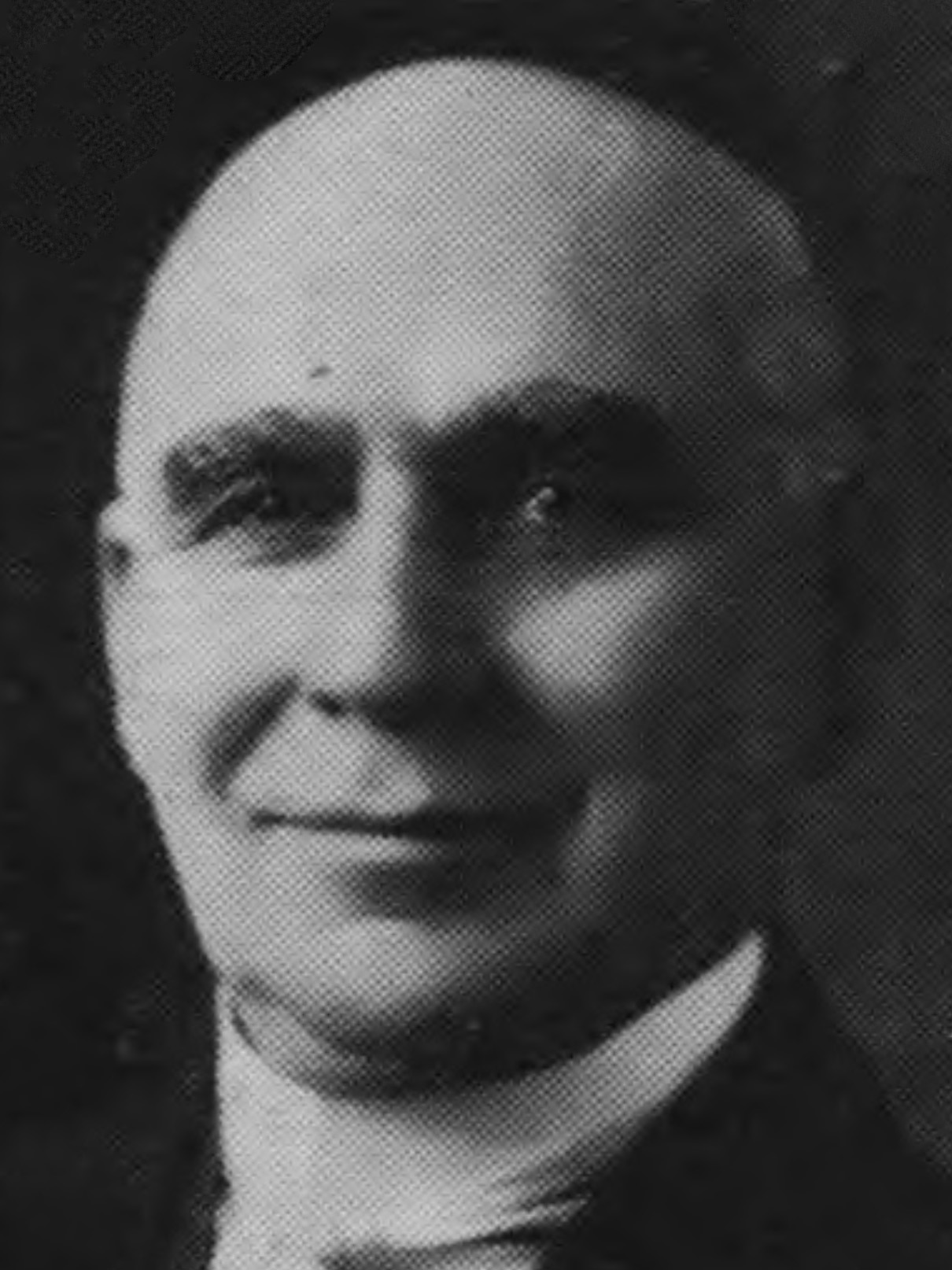

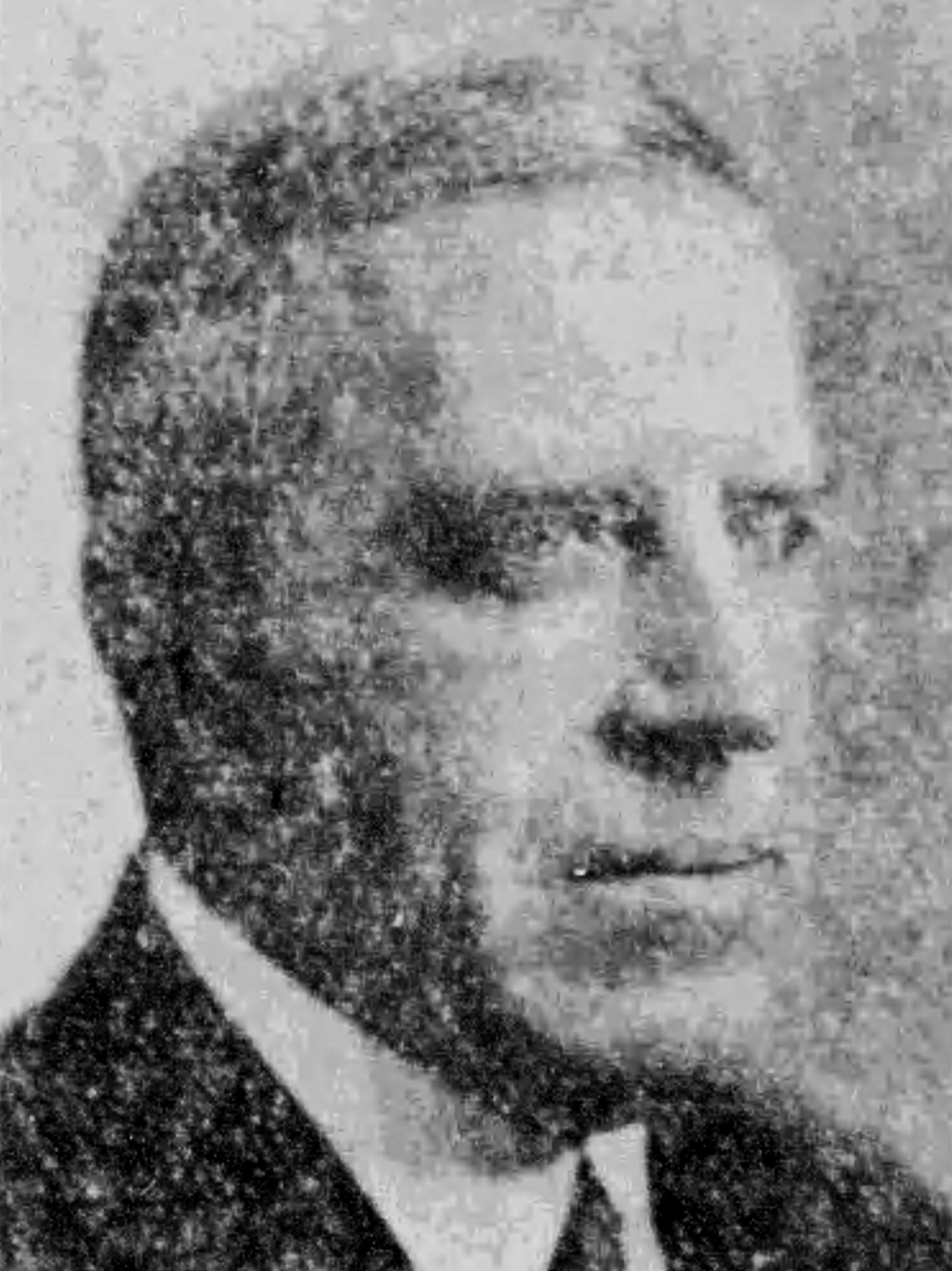
Nominee	Frank Merriam	Martin I. Welsh
Party	Republican	Democratic
Popular vote	879,597	403,832
Percentage	66.38%	30.48%
- County results Merriam: 40–50% 50–60% 60–70% 70–80% Welsh: 50–60%
Lieutenant Governor before election
Herschel L. Carnahan
Republican
Elected Lieutenant Governor
Frank Merriam
Republican

The 1930 California lieutenant gubernatorial election was held on November 4, 1930. Republican State Senator Frank Merriam defeated Democratic Sacramento Mayor Martin I. Welsh with 66.38% of the vote.

== General election ==
=== Candidates ===
- Frank Merriam, Republican
- Martin I. Welsh, Democratic
- Chaim Shapiro, Socialist

=== Results ===
1930 California lieutenant gubernatorial election
Party	Candidate	Votes	%	±%
Republican	Frank Merriam	879,597	66.38%	
Democratic	Martin I. Welsh	403,832	30.48%	
Socialist	Chaim Shapiro	41,638	3.14%	
Majority		1,325,067		
Turnout				
Republican hold		Swing		
