= California's 70th State Assembly district =

American legislative district

Coordinates: 33.7665°N 117.9733°W

Current assemblymember
Tri Ta; R–Westminster
- Population (2020) • Voting age • Citizen voting age: 472,278; 375,023; 312,399
- Demographics: 22.06% White; 1.08% Black; 33.94% Latino; 39.16% Asian; 0.15% Native American; 0.41% Hawaiian/Pacific Islander; 0.4% other; 2.81% remainder of multiracial

California's 70th State Assembly district is one of 80 California State Assembly districts. It is currently represented by Republican Tri Ta of Westminster.

== District profile ==
The district encompasses parts of Northern Orange County including Little Saigon and has a significant Vietnamese American population.

Orange County

- Anaheim Island (partially)
- Fountain Valley
- Garden Grove
- Huntington Beach (partially)
- Los Alamitos
- Midway City
- Rossmoor
- Santa Ana (partially)
- Seal Beach (partially)
- Stanton
- Westminster

== Election results from statewide races ==
Year	Office	Results
2024	President	Trump 50.2 - 47.1%
2022	Governor	Dahle 51.7 – 48.3%
2022	Senator	Meuser 52.5 – 47.5%
2021	Recall	No 68.2 – 31.8%
2020	President	Biden 69.3 - 26.5%
2018	Governor	Newsom 69.1 – 30.9%
2018	Senator	Feinstein 55.5 – 44.5%
2016	President	Clinton 68.1 – 25.1%
2016	Senator	Harris 63.6 – 36.4%
2014	Governor	Brown 63.5 – 36.5%
2012	President	Obama 67.4 – 29.9%
2012	Senator	Feinstein 68.7 – 31.3%

== List of assembly members representing the district ==
Due to redistricting, the 70th district has been moved around different parts of the state. The current iteration resulted from the 2021 redistricting by the California Citizens Redistricting Commission.

Assembly members	Party	Years served	Counties represented	Notes
Angus Marion Clark	Democratic	January 5, 1885 – January 3, 1887	Fresno	
Joseph Phillip Vincent	Republican	January 3, 1887 – January 7, 1889	Fresno	
Egbert Harris Tucker	Democratic	January 7, 1889 – January 5, 1891	Fresno	
G. W. Mordecai	Democratic	January 5, 1891 – January 2, 1893	Fresno	
Cyrus Mortimer Simpson	Republican	January 2, 1893 – January 7, 1895	Los Angeles	
Henry G. Weyse	Republican	January 7, 1895 – January 4, 1897	Los Angeles	
Walter S. Melick	Republican	January 4, 1897 – January 2, 1899	Los Angeles	
Charles Edson	People's	January 2, 1899 – January 1, 1901	Los Angeles	
Walter S. Melick	Republican	January 1, 1901 – January 5, 1903	Los Angeles	
William H. Kelso	Republican	January 5, 1903 – January 2, 1905	Los Angeles	
William H. Wickersham	Republican	January 2, 1905 – January 7, 1907	Los Angeles	
Walter Ransome Leeds	Republican	January 7, 1907 – January 2, 1911	Los Angeles	
Edwin M. Butler	Republican	January 2, 1911 – January 6, 1913	Los Angeles	
John H. Strine	Republican	January 6, 1913 – January 4, 1915	Los Angeles	
Joseph A. Rominger	Republican	January 4, 1915 – January 8, 1917	Los Angeles	
Frank Merriam	Republican	January 8, 1917 – January 3, 1927	Los Angeles	
Morgan Keaton	Republican	January 3, 1927 – January 5, 1931	Los Angeles	
James K. Reid	Republican	January 5, 1931 – January 2, 1933	Los Angeles	
Ira S. Hatch	Republican	January 2, 1933 – January 7, 1935	Los Angeles	
John Gee Clark	Democratic	January 7, 1935 – January 2, 1939	Los Angeles	
Maurice E. Atkinson	Democratic	January 2, 1939 – January 6, 1941	Los Angeles	
Lorne D. Middough	Democratic	January 6, 1941 – January 6, 1947	Los Angeles	
William S. Grant	Republican	January 6, 1947 – January 5, 1953	Los Angeles	
Willis W. Bradley	Republican	January 5, 1953 – January 3, 1955	Los Angeles	
William S. Grant	Republican	January 3, 1955 – January 7, 1963	Los Angeles	
James Edward Whetmore	Republican	January 7, 1963 – January 2, 1967	Orange	
Robert H. Burke	Republican	January 6, 1967 – November 30, 1974	Orange	
Bruce Nestande	Republican	December 2, 1974 – November 30, 1980	Orange	
John Lewis	Republican	December 1, 1980 – November 30, 1982	Orange	
Marian Bergeson	Republican	December 6, 1982 – November 30, 1984	Orange	
Gil Ferguson	Republican	December 3, 1984 – November 30, 1994	Orange	
Marilyn Brewer	Republican	December 5, 1994 – November 30, 2000	Orange	
John B. T. Campbell III	Republican	December 4, 2000 – November 30, 2004	Orange	
Chuck DeVore	Republican	December 6, 2004 – November 30, 2010	Orange	
Donald P. Wagner	Republican	December 6, 2010 – November 30, 2012	Orange	
Bonnie Lowenthal	Democratic	December 3, 2012 – November 30, 2014	Los Angeles	
Patrick O'Donnell	Democratic	December 1, 2014 – November 30, 2022	Los Angeles	
Tri Ta	Republican	December 5, 2022 – present	Orange	

== Election results (1990–present) ==
=== 2024 ===
2024 California State Assembly 70th district election
Primary election
Party	Candidate	Votes	%
Republican	Tri Ta (incumbent)	46,752	59.5
Democratic	Jimmy D. Pham	31,812	40.5
Total votes		78,564	100.0
General election
Republican	Tri Ta (incumbent)	96,083	54.7
Democratic	Jimmy D. Pham	79,587	45.3
Total votes		175,670	100.0
Republican hold			

=== 2022 ===
2022 California State Assembly 70th district election
Party	Candidate	Votes	%
Democratic	Diedre Thu-Ha Nguyen	31,293	39.7
Republican	Tri Ta	16,708	21.2
Republican	Ted Bui	10,968	13.9
Republican	Kimberly Ho	10,936	13.9
Republican	Emily Hibard	5,278	6.7
Republican	Jason Gray	3,624	4.6
Total votes		78,807	100.0
General election
Republican	Tri Ta	64,849	53.8
Democratic	Diedre Thu-Ha Nguyen	55,661	46.2
Total votes		120,510	100.0
Republican gain from Democratic			

=== 2020 ===
2020 California State Assembly 70th district election
Primary election
Party	Candidate	Votes	%
Democratic	Patrick O'Donnell (incumbent)	78,609	74.4
Republican	David W. Thomas	27,081	25.6
Total votes		105,690	100.0
General election
Democratic	Patrick O'Donnell (incumbent)	143,191	71.7
Republican	David W. Thomas	56,516	28.3
Total votes		199,707	100.0
Democratic hold			

=== 2018 ===
2018 California State Assembly 70th district election
Primary election
Party	Candidate	Votes	%
Democratic	Patrick O'Donnell (incumbent)	41,480	59.2
Libertarian	Honor "Mimi" Robson	11,779	16.9
Democratic	Elliot Ruben Gonzales	9,304	13.4
Green	Rachel Alexandra Bruhnke	7,062	10.1
Total votes		69,625	100.0
General election
Democratic	Patrick O'Donnell (incumbent)	103,915	72.9
Libertarian	Honor "Mimi" Robson	38,706	27.1
Total votes		142,621	100.0
Democratic hold			

=== 2016 ===
2016 California State Assembly 70th district election
Primary election
Party	Candidate	Votes	%
Democratic	Patrick O'Donnell (incumbent)	69,816	99.5
Republican	Martha E. Flores-Gibson (write-in)	328	0.5
Democratic	Billy Graham (write-in)	12	0.0
Total votes		70,156	100.0
General election
Democratic	Patrick O'Donnell (incumbent)	107,389	66.6
Republican	Martha E. Flores-Gibson	53,805	33.4
Total votes		161,194	100.0
Democratic hold			

=== 2014 ===
2014 California State Assembly 70th district election
Primary election
Party	Candidate	Votes	%
Democratic	Patrick O'Donnell	21,949	40.6
Republican	John C. Goya	17,367	32.2
Democratic	Suja Lowenthal	14,697	27.2
Total votes		54,013	100.0
General election
Democratic	Patrick O'Donnell	48,978	63.8
Republican	John C. Goya	27,755	36.2
Total votes		76,733	100.0
Democratic hold			

=== 2012 ===
2012 California State Assembly 70th district election
Primary election
Party	Candidate	Votes	%
Democratic	Bonnie Lowenthal (incumbent)	29,082	58.6
Republican	Martha Flores Gibson	20,569	41.4
Total votes		49,651	100.0
General election
Democratic	Bonnie Lowenthal (incumbent)	100,676	65.8
Republican	Martha Flores Gibson	52,321	34.2
Total votes		152,997	100.0
Democratic gain from Republican			

=== 2010 ===
2010 California State Assembly 70th district election
Party	Candidate	Votes	%
Republican	Donald P. Wagner	89,636	58.2
Democratic	Melissa Fox	58,208	37.8
Libertarian	Deborah Tharp	6,212	4.0
Total votes		154,056	100.0
Republican hold			

=== 2008 ===
2008 California State Assembly 70th district election
Party	Candidate	Votes	%
Republican	Chuck DeVore (incumbent)	114,556	57.8
Democratic	Michael Glover	83,709	42.2
Total votes		198,265	100.0
Republican hold			

=== 2006 ===
2006 California State Assembly 70th district election
Party	Candidate	Votes	%
Republican	Chuck DeVore (incumbent)	78,724	60.5
Democratic	Michael Glover	51,453	39.5
Total votes		130,177	100.0
Republican hold			

=== 2004 ===
2004 California State Assembly 70th district election
Party	Candidate	Votes	%
Republican	Chuck DeVore	112,844	61.1
Democratic	Carl Mariz	65,351	35.4
Libertarian	Mark Baldwin	6,506	3.5
Total votes		184,701	100.0
Republican hold			

=== 2002 ===
2002 California State Assembly 70th district election
Party	Candidate	Votes	%
Republican	John Campbell (incumbent)	73,880	66.9
Democratic	John Kane	33,449	30.2
Libertarian	Paul L. Studier	3,215	2.9
Total votes		110,544	100.0
Republican hold			

=== 2000 ===
2000 California State Assembly 70th district election
Party	Candidate	Votes	%
Republican	John Campbell	96,145	59.6
Democratic	Merritt L. McKeon	54,349	33.7
Libertarian	Robert A. Vondruska	5,324	3.3
Natural Law	Barry L. Katz	3,855	2.4
Reform	Raymond O. Mills	1,736	1.1
Total votes		161,409	100.0
Republican hold			

=== 1998 ===
1998 California State Assembly 70th district election
Party	Candidate	Votes	%
Republican	Marilyn Brewer (incumbent)	84,433	77.4
Natural Law	Nat Adam	24,627	22.6
Total votes		109,060	100.0
Republican hold			

=== 1996 ===
1996 California State Assembly 70th district election
Party	Candidate	Votes	%
Republican	Marilyn Brewer (incumbent)	89,306	61.5
Democratic	Shirley W. Palley	45,746	31.5
Libertarian	Gene Beed	6,221	4.3
Natural Law	Paul R. Fisher	4,017	2.8
Total votes		145,290	100.0
Republican hold			

=== 1994 ===
1994 California State Assembly 70th district election
Party	Candidate	Votes	%
Republican	Marilyn Brewer	89,493	71.7
Democratic	Jim Toledano	35,355	28.3
Total votes		124,848	100.0
Republican hold			

=== 1992 ===
1992 California State Assembly 70th district election
Party	Candidate	Votes	%
Republican	Gil Ferguson (incumbent)	93,865	56.7
Democratic	Jim Toledano	59,976	36.2
Libertarian	Scott Bieser	11,763	7.1
Total votes		165,604	100.0
Republican hold			

=== 1990 ===
1990 California State Assembly 70th district election
Party	Candidate	Votes	%
Republican	Gil Ferguson (incumbent)	92,531	64.7
Democratic	Howard Adler	50,418	35.3
Total votes		142,949	100.0
Republican hold			

== See also ==
- California State Assembly
- California State Assembly districts
- Districts in California
