= Lenox College =

Presbyterian college in Hopkinton, Iowa

Coordinates: 42.345°N 91.243°W

- Stained glass in the museum church
- Former names: Bowen Collegiate Institute, Lenox Collegiate Institute
- Type: Private
- Active: 1859–1944
- Religious affiliation: Presbyterian Church (USA)
- Location: Hopkinton, Iowa, United States
- Campus: Rural

Lenox College was a college in Hopkinton, Iowa that operated from 1859 until its closure in 1944. The institution was initially known as Bowen Collegiate Institute. The name was changed to Lenox Collegiate Institute in October 1864 and to Lenox College in 1884.

== History ==
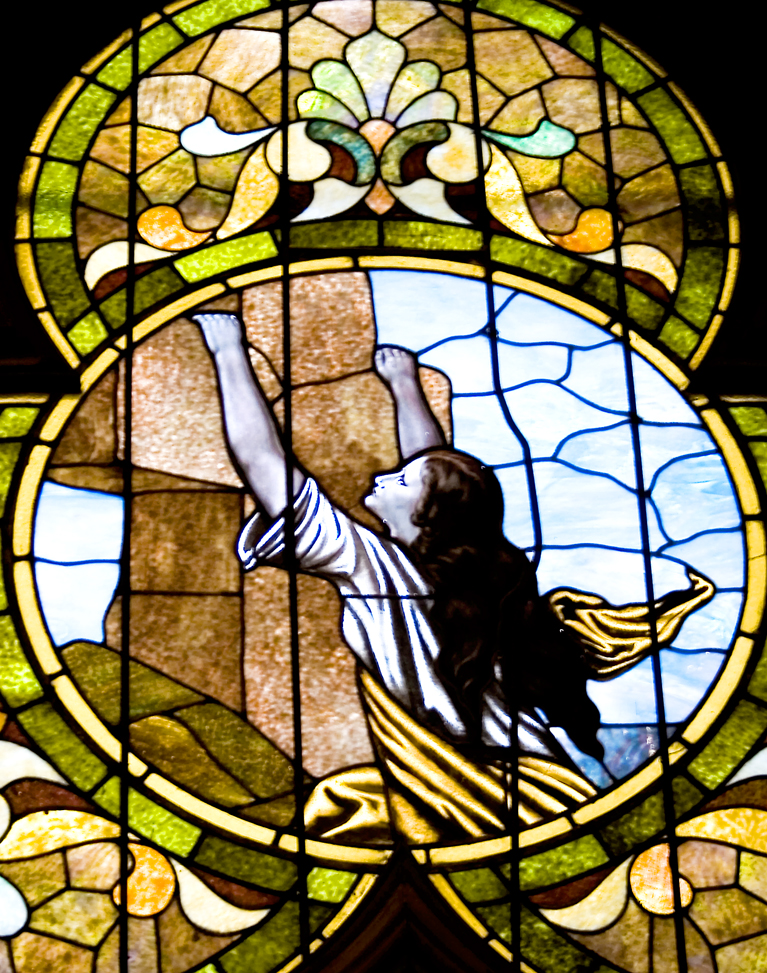
More stained glass in the museum church

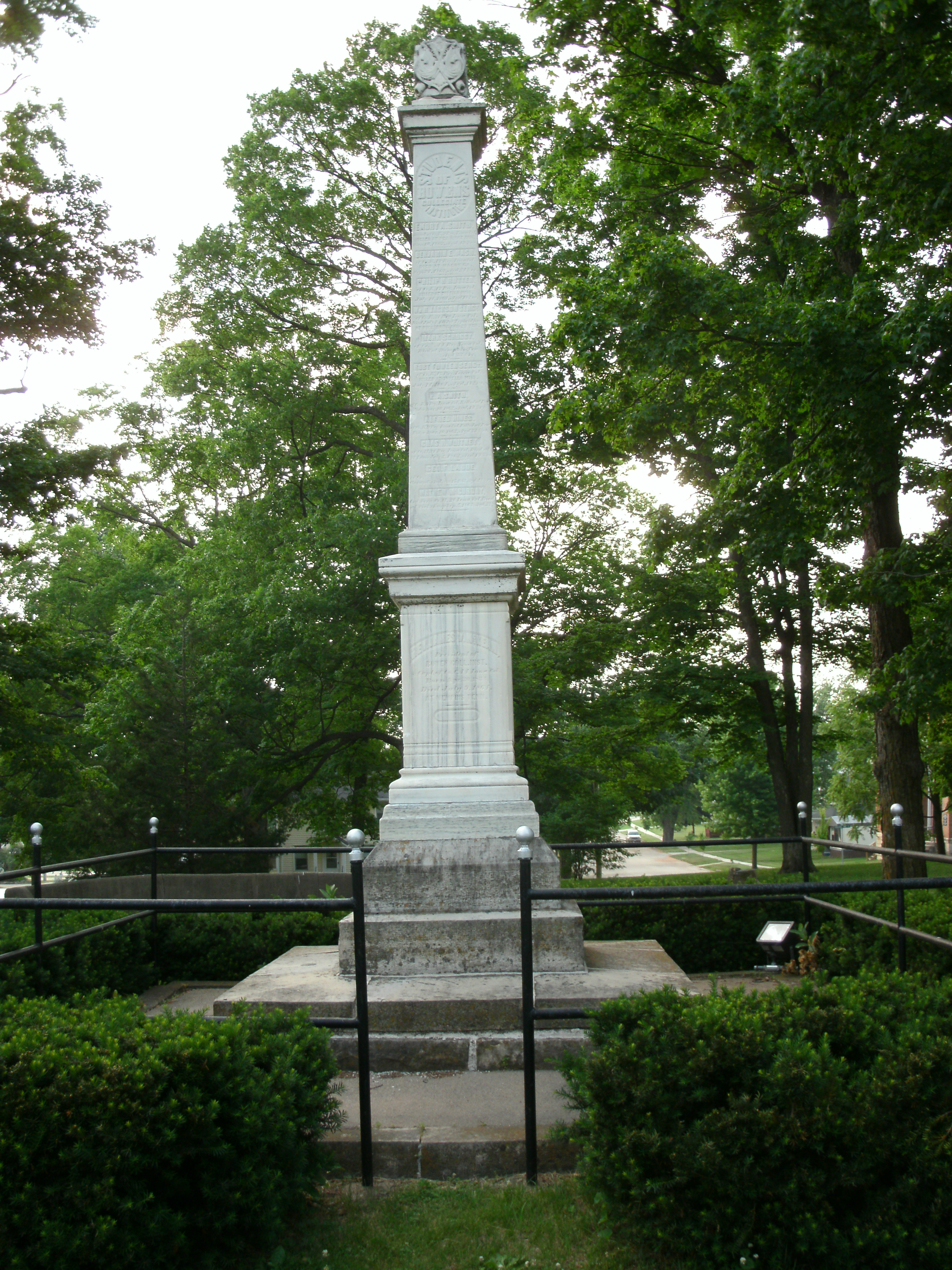
Lenox Collegiate Civil War Monument

The school was affiliated with the Presbyterian Church. Several buildings that were part of the former college campus are on the National Register of Historic Places and are maintained by the Delaware County Historical Society as the Delaware County Historical Museum Complex. The college campus and the community of Hopkinton are also designated as stops on the Delaware Crossing Iowa Scenic Byways. The former building of the Hopkinton Reformed Presbyterian Church is located next to the campus, although it was not a part of the college's sponsoring church.

The centerpiece of the campus is the Civil War Monument, dedicated 17 November 1865. The monument at the center of the campus was the first monument on a campus dedicated to the American Civil War. The majority of the young men of the college with the dean of the college as their captain signed on for military service shortly after the war began, causing the school to close temporarily. The monument is dedicated to them.

Construction of Old Main began in 1856. The Victorian style east wing was added in 1875. Clarke Hall, the dormitory for girls, was built in 1890. Doolittle Hall, constructed in 1900, contained the Library and Literary Societies. Finkbonner Hall (the gymnasium) was erected in 1916.

Other buildings in the complex include the Hopkinton Depot, which was moved to the present site in 1969. The Reformed Presbyterian Church, with its remarkable Bavarian stained-glass windows, was dedicated in 1901 and donated to the Society in 1969. The one-room school was purchased and moved to its present location - next to the church - in 1971. A Farm Machinery Hall, which houses displays of horse-drawn farm equipment, was added in 1973. A second Farm Machinery Hall was built in 1982.

== Presidents ==
- Dr. W.L. Roberts was selected as the first president, but resigned on December 12, 1859.
- Rev. Jerome Allen, Ph.D., 1859-1863.
- Rev. James McKean, Fall, 1863 until resignation May 6, 1864; entered army as a captain and died at Memphis, TN on July 9, 1864.
- Rev. James D. Mason, July, 1864 until formal resignation October, 1865.
- Rev. Jerome Allen, served from November, 1864 until June, 1866.
- Rev. Samuel Hodge, served September, 1866 until 1882.
- J. H. Ritchey, served 1882 until 1888.
- Rev. Alexander G. Wilson, served 1888 until fall 1894.
- Rev. Hugh Robinson, first alum (1888) to serve as president, 1894-1896.
- Andrew G. Wilson, alum (1880), became president in spring 1896 and served until spring 1902.
- Rev. Francis William Grossman, accepted presidency in February, 1902 and resigned July, 1906.
- Dr. E. E. Reed, served from summer 1906 through spring 1915; previously served as president of Buena Vista College in Iowa and then served as president of Westminster College in Fulton, Missouri after leaving Lenox.
- Dr. A. St. Clair Mackenzie, served from fall 1916 until his resignation on August 1, 1917.
- Dr. J.F. Hinkhouse, served from July 1, 1919 until 1924.
- Dr. W.W. Carlton, alum (1884), was in poor health and the institution was effectively under leadership of Dean E.V. Laughlin until his death in November 1938.
- Rev. Frank Allen, served from 1938 until the decision was finally made to close the institution after the spring semester 1944.

== Notable alumni ==
- Samuel Calvin (1840-1911), pioneering Iowa geologist, professor at the University of Iowa
- Dave Cropp (1876-?) baseball and football coach
- Charles Vaill Laughlin, taught political science at Lenox College (1932-1932, 1938-1939) and law at Washington & Lee University (1940–42, 1946-1977)
- Thomas Macbride (1848–1934), president at University of Iowa (1914-1916)
- James W. McKean (b.1860), missionary to Siam, founder of leprosy hospital, now the McKean Institute
- John Merriam (1869–1945), paleontologist, professor at University of California,
- Charles Merriam (1874–1953), professor at University of Chicago (1900-1940), president of American Political Science Association (1925)
- Frank Merriam (1865–1955), auditor of Iowa (1899-1903), governor of California (1935-1939)
- David Tappan (1845–1922), president of Miami University
- H.C. Velte (b.1879), missionary to India
- Mary Walker (1832-1919), American feminist, abolitionist, prohibitionist, alleged spy, prisoner of war and surgeon. She is the only woman ever to receive the Medal of Honor.

== See also ==
- List of colleges and universities in Iowa
