= Tri Ta =

American politician (born 1973)

- Tạ Đức Trí
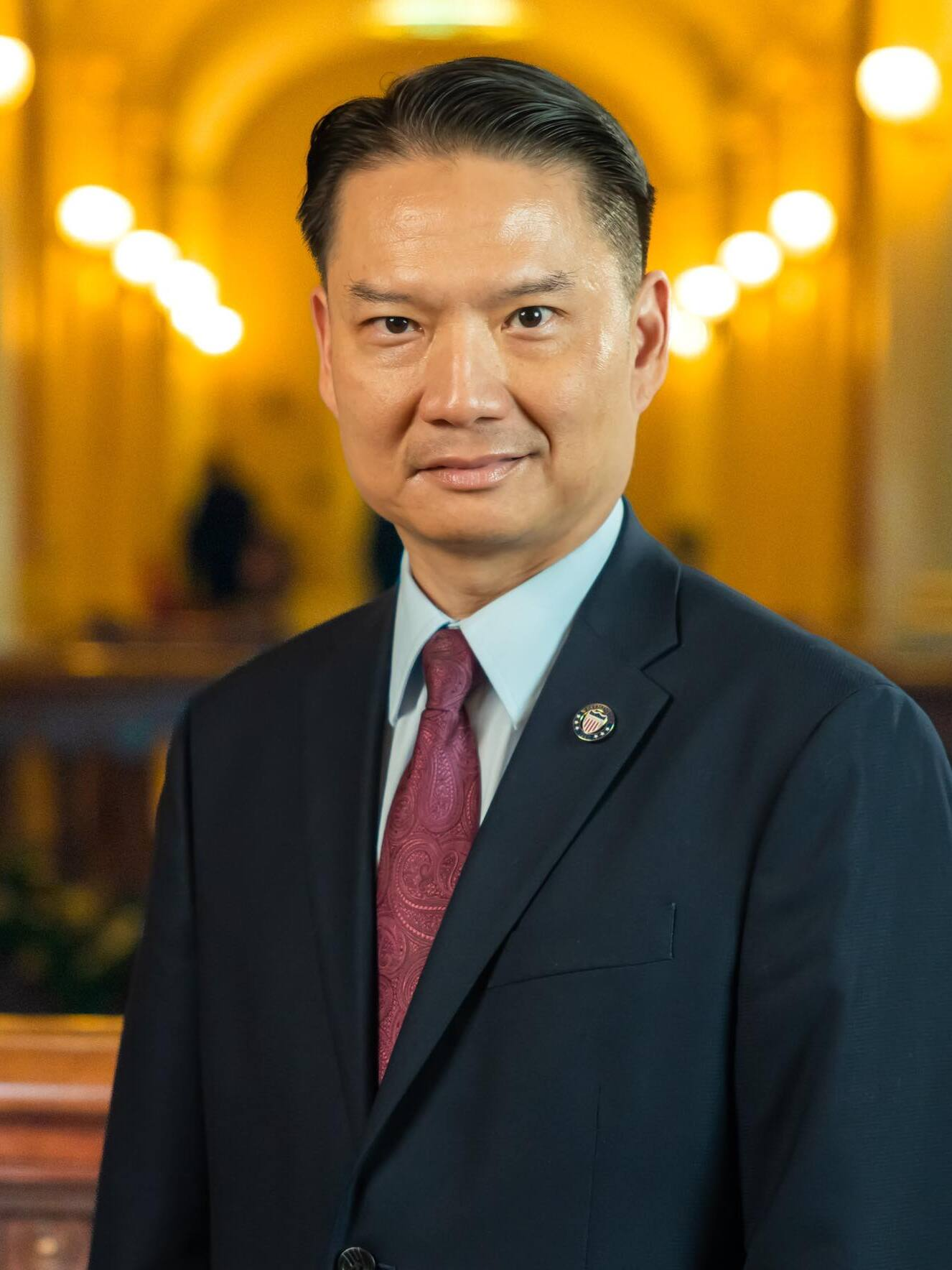
- Official portrait, 2022

Member of the California State Assembly from the 70th district
- Incumbent
- Assumed office December 5, 2022
- Preceded by: Patrick O'Donnell
- Succeeded by: Paula Swift (elect)

Mayor of Westminster
- In office 2012–2022
- Preceded by: Margie Rice
- Succeeded by: Chi Charlie Nguyen

Personal details
- Born: April 10, 1973 (age 53) Saigon, South Vietnam (now Vietnam)
- Party: Republican
- Education: California State University, Los Angeles (BA)

Tri Ta (born April 10, 1973) is a Vietnamese-born American politician currently serving as a member of the California State Assembly. He represents Assembly District 70, which consists of much of the Little Saigon area of northwestern Orange County. He previously served as Mayor of Westminster, California.

== Early life and education ==
Ta was born in Saigon in Vietnam (now Ho Chi Minh City). In 1992, he and his parents immigrated to the United States as refugees after spending their time in a reeducation camp, when he was 19.

He attended California State University, Los Angeles and earned a Bachelor of Arts in Political Science.

== Political career ==
Ta served as a city councilor in Westminster before being elected mayor. He became mayor in 2012 and was the city's first Vietnamese-American mayor. Ta was reelected in 2018. He is a Republican and has advocated for the Republican Party to take a greater interest in Vietnamese voters. Vietnamese Americans traditionally voted Republicans, but Democrats have made gains recently, especially in Orange County.

In 2019, Ta attracted publicity for clashing with other members of Westminster's city council. He and fellow council members Kimberly Ho and Chi Charlie Nguyen frequently sparred with the remaining members. Notably, they passed a controversial resolution alleging that the Vietnamese government was improperly interfering in city politics. This dispute culminated in the three voting to change the council's procedures over the objections of other members. Opponents of the three councilors filed for a recall election in response. In April 2020, Ta and his allies survived the recall attempt.

In January 2022, Ta announced his intention to run for election to the California State Assembly in District 70, which was being vacated by incumbent Janet Nguyen. He placed second in the top-two primary in June and faced Garden Grove City Councilwoman Diedre Thu-Ha Nguyen in the November general election. That same year, a council dispute over renewing Westminster's sales tax placed the city at risk of bankruptcy. Ta was also censured for false statements he made about other councilors.

In November 2022, Ta won the election to represent the 70th district in the California State Assembly. He took office in December.

As a delegate for Trump, Ta has supported Donald Trump as U.S. President in the 2024 presidential election.

== California State Assembly ==
In 2023, Ta secured $1 million in state funding for the development of a universally accessible playground at Fountain Valley Sports Park. The project was designed to provide recreational facilities accessible to children with a range of physical abilities.

In 2024, Ta introduced legislation concerning Mendez v. Westminster, the 1947 federal court case challenging school segregation in Orange County. The legislation sought to incorporate the case and its role in California school desegregation into the state's history-social science curriculum. The effort received support from members of the Mendez family, whose involvement in the case contributed to the challenge against segregated schools in California.

Ta also introduced legislation to prohibit loitering in a public place with the intent to purchase commercial sex. The proposal was developed in connection with concerns raised by the City of Stanton regarding prostitution and related activity. The legislation was among a number of bills that failed to advance through the California Legislature in 2024.

In the area of behavioral health, Ta authored legislation intended to protect continued access to treatment for people with autism and other lifelong developmental disabilities. The measure prohibited health plans from requiring patients to obtain a new diagnosis solely because they had reached a certain age in order to continue receiving medically necessary behavioral health treatment. The legislation was subsequently signed into law.

In 2025, Ta authored legislation seeking to limit increases in certain utility rates so that they would not exceed the rate of inflation. The proposal advanced through a legislative committee in March 2025.

Ta also authored a measure designating October 18 as Huell Howser Day in California, recognizing television personality Huell Howser, who was known for documenting California history, communities and culture through his television programs.

Ta has also authored legislation addressing the unauthorized collection of genetic material. The proposal would make it a crime, under specified circumstances, to collect another person's DNA without that person's consent.

In 2025, the Regional Center of Orange County named Ta its "Elected Official of the Year" as part of its Spotlight Awards. The organization recognized Ta for his legislative work involving autism, developmental disabilities and access to behavioral health services.

In 2026, following a chemical emergency in Garden Grove, Ta introduced legislation that would exempt qualifying settlement payments received by people affected by the incident from California state income taxation.

== Electoral history ==
=== Westminster Mayor ===
Westminster, California mayoral election, 2012
Candidate	Votes	%
Tri Ta	11,861	44.6
Penny Loomer	7,677	28.8
Al Hamade	4,885	18.4
Ha Mach	1,191	4.5
Tamara Sue Pennington	998	3.8
Total votes	26,612	100.0

Westminster, California mayoral election, 2014
Candidate	Votes	%
Tri Ta (incumbent)	14,198	84.8
Andy Truc Nguyen	2,540	15.2
Total votes	16,738	100.0

Westminster, California mayoral election, 2016
Candidate	Votes	%
Tri Ta (incumbent)	16,094	56.4
Margie L. Rice	9,220	32.3
Raymond De La Cerda	2,004	7.0
Visual William	1,232	4.3
Total votes	28,550	100.0

Westminster, California mayoral election, 2018
Candidate	Votes	%
Tri Ta (incumbent)	18,344	72.7
Christopher Ochoa	6,878	27.3
Total votes	25,222	100.0

Westminster, California mayoral recall election, 2020
Choice	Votes	%
For	6,970	40.68
Against	10,165	59.32
Total	17,135	100.00
Source: Orange County Registrar of Voters

=== California State Assembly ===
2022 California State Assembly 70th district election
Party	Candidate	Votes	%
Democratic	Diedre Thu-Ha Nguyen	31,293	39.7
Republican	Tri Ta	16,708	21.2
Republican	Ted Bui	10,968	13.9
Republican	Kimberly Ho	10,936	13.9
Republican	Emily Hibard	5,278	6.7
Republican	Jason Gray	3,624	4.6
Total votes		78,807	100.0
General election
Republican	Tri Ta	64,849	53.8
Democratic	Diedre Thu-Ha Nguyen	55,661	46.2
Total votes		120,510	100.0
Republican gain from Democratic			

2024 California State Assembly 70th district election
Primary election
Party	Candidate	Votes	%
Republican	Tri Ta (incumbent)	46,752	59.5
Democratic	Jimmy D. Pham	31,812	40.5
Total votes		78,564	100.0
General election
Republican	Tri Ta (incumbent)	96,083	54.7
Democratic	Jimmy D. Pham	79,587	45.3
Total votes		175,670	100.0
Republican hold			
