= Morgan Keaton =

American politician (1891–1981)

Member of the California State Assembly from the 70th district
- In office January 3, 1927 - January 5, 1931
- Preceded by: Frank Merriam
- Succeeded by: James K. Reid

Personal details
- Born: October 21, 1891 Copper Hill, Virginia, US
- Died: May 11, 1981 (aged 89) Riverside, California, US
- Party: Republican
- Spouse: Jessie Helen Brown (m. 1917)
- Children: 3

Military service
- Branch/service: United States Army
- Battles/wars: World War I

Morgan Keaton served in the California State Assembly for the 70th district from 1927 to 1931. During World War I he served in the United States Army.
