= John Gee Clark =

American politician

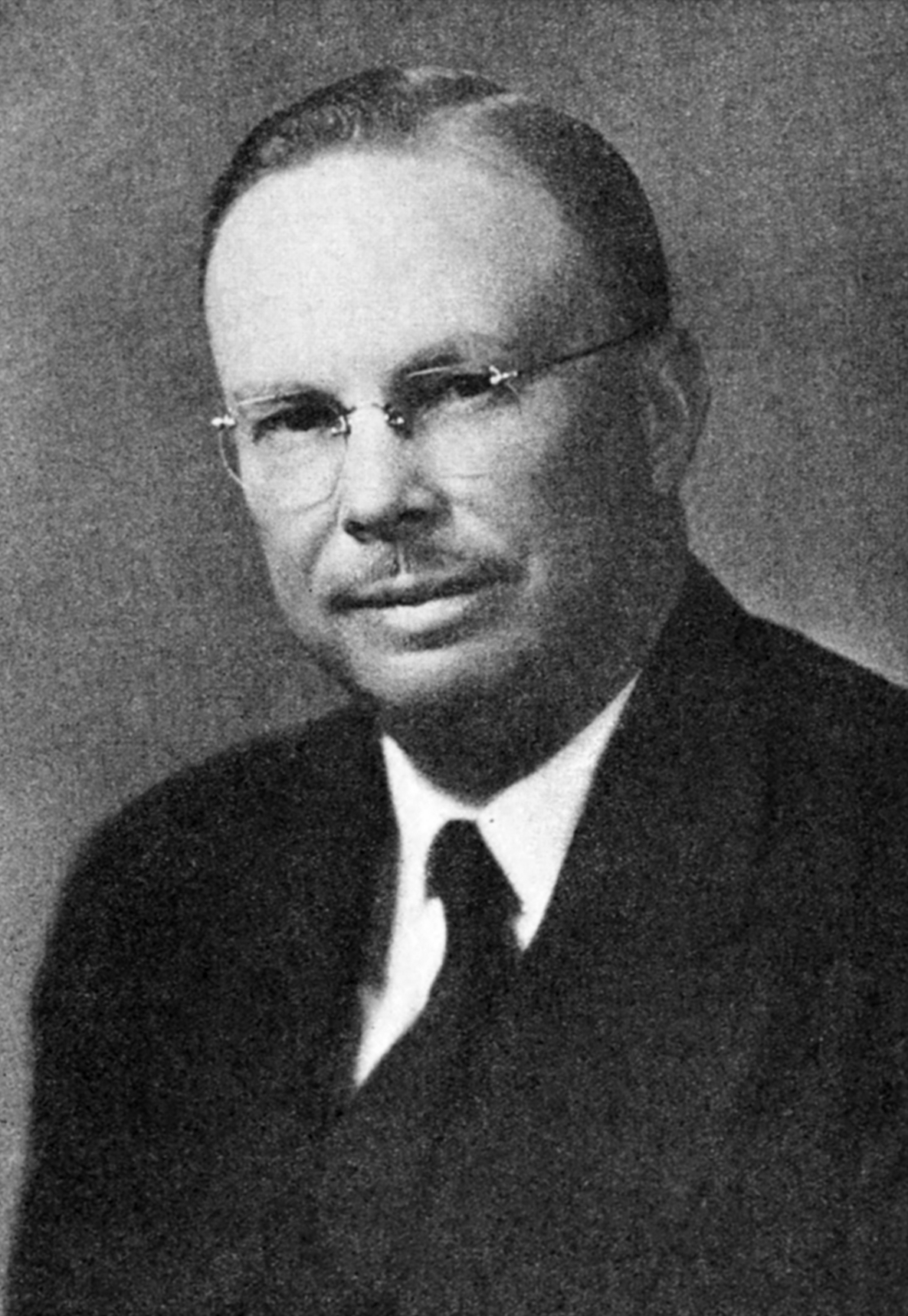
- Clark c. 1941

Judge of the Los Angeles County Superior Court
- In office October 21, 1941 – October 1, 1959
- Appointed by: Culbert Olson

Director of the California Department of Penology
- In office January 20, 1939 – October 18, 1941
- Appointed by: Culbert Olson
- Succeeded by: Booth B. Goodman

Chairman of the California Democratic Party
- In office September 16, 1938 – April 8, 1939
- Preceded by: Clifford C. Anglim
- Succeeded by: Paul Peek

Member of the California State Assembly from the 70th district
- In office January 7, 1935 – January 2, 1939
- Preceded by: Ira S. Hatch
- Succeeded by: Maurice E. Atkinson

Personal details
- Born: March 23, 1890 Orange County, California, U.S.
- Died: November 11, 1984 (aged 94) California, U.S.
- Party: Democratic
- Spouse: Josephine Hunt
- Children: 2

Military service
- Branch/service: United States Army
- Battles/wars: World War I

John Gee Clark (March 23, 1890 - November 11, 1984) was an American lawyer and politician who served in the California State Assembly for the 70th district from 1935 to 1939, as chairman of the California Democratic Party from 1938 to 1939, as director of the California Department of Penology from 1939 to 1941, and as a judge of the Los Angeles County Superior Court from 1941 to 1959.

Clark served as an assistant probation officer for Los Angeles County from 1913 to 1917. During World War I, he served in the United States Army.

Clark was one of two dozen "EPIC Democrats" elected to the state legislature in 1934.

== Works ==
- The Lawyer and Parole (1941). Sacramento: California Board of Prison Terms and Paroles.
