= Hopkinton, Iowa =

- City
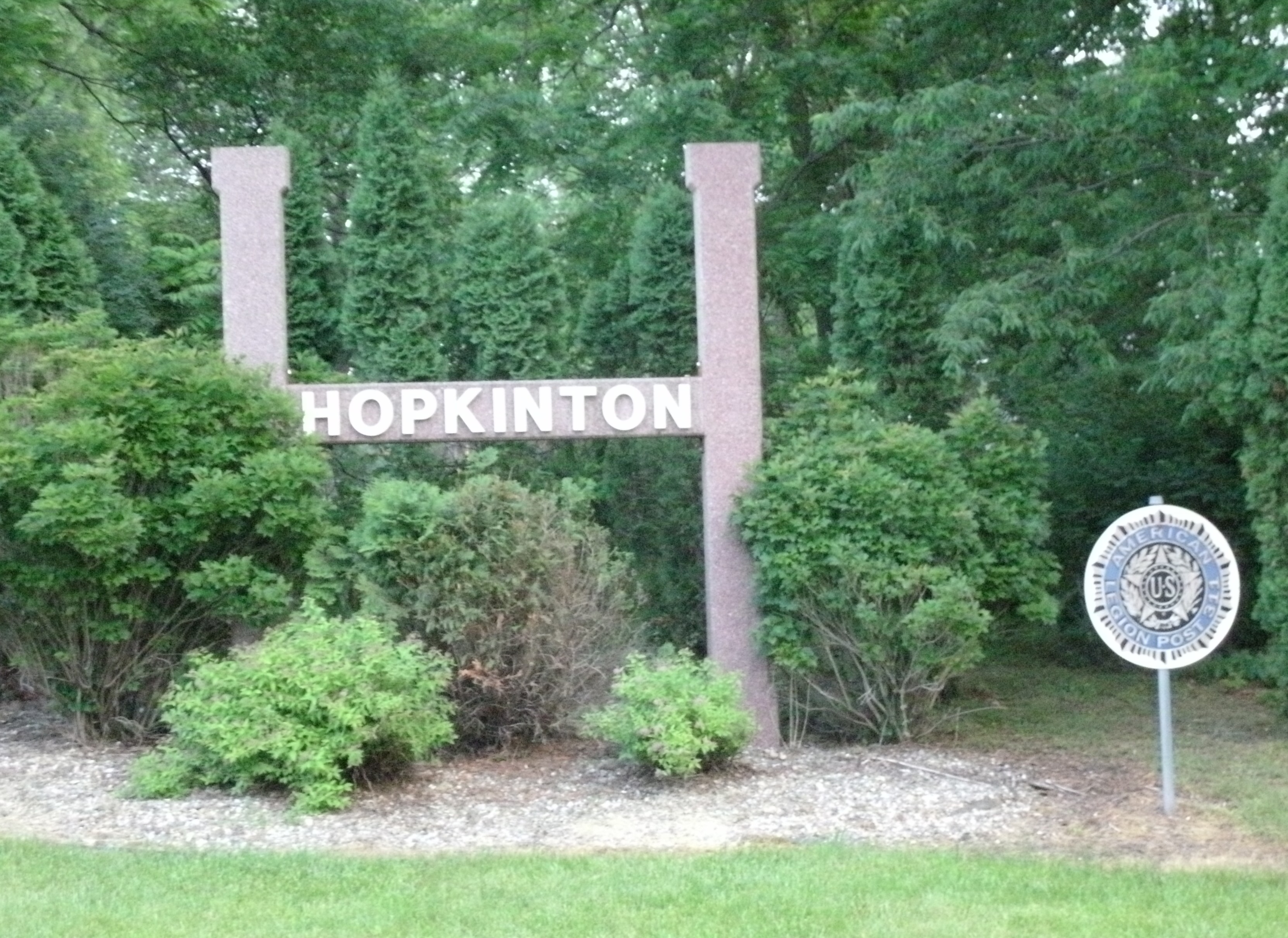
- Welcome sign on Iowa Highway 38 (2010)

- Location within Delaware County and Iowa
- Coordinates: 42°20′30″N 91°15′08″W
- Country: United States
- State: Iowa
- County: Delaware
- Incorporated: March 3, 1874

Area
  - Total: 0.64 sq mi (1.66 km^{2})
  - Land: 0.64 sq mi (1.66 km^{2})
  - Water: 0 sq mi (0.00 km^{2})
- Elevation: 850 ft (260 m)

Population (2020)
  - Total: 622
  - Density: 970/sq mi (375/km^{2})
- Time zone: UTC-6 (Central (CST))
  - Summer (DST): UTC-5 (CDT)
- ZIP code: 52237
- Area code: 563
- FIPS code: 19-37155
- GNIS ID: 2394419
- Website: cityofhopkinton.org

Hopkinton is a city in Delaware County, Iowa, United States. The population was 622 at the time of the 2020 census.

== History ==
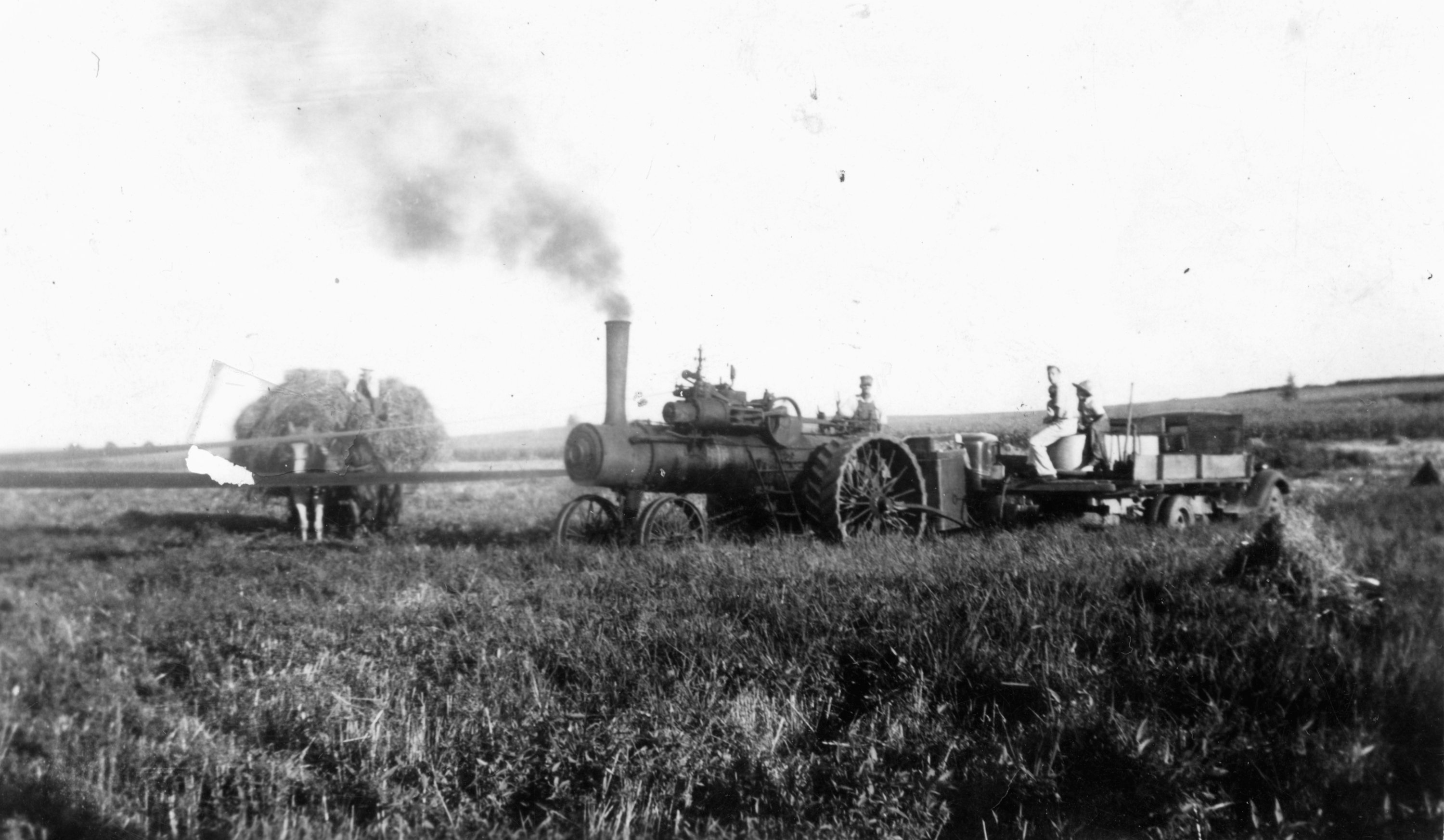
Farm near Hopkinton (1936)

Hopkinton was laid out in 1850, and it was incorporated in 1874.

The city is the former home of Lenox College, a small school that closed in 1944. The old campus is still maintained as Delaware County Historical Museum Complex.

== Geography ==
Hopkinton is located near the Maquoketa River. According to the United States Census Bureau, the city has a total area of 0.62 square miles (1.61 km^{2}), all land.

== Demographics ==
Historical population
Census	Pop.	Note	%±
1880	645		—
1890	668		3.6%
1900	767		14.8%
1910	797		3.9%
1920	759		−4.8%
1930	758		−0.1%
1940	841		10.9%
1950	731		−13.1%
1960	768		5.1%
1970	800		4.2%
1980	774		−3.2%
1990	695		−10.2%
2000	681		−2.0%
2010	628		−7.8%
2020	622		−1.0%
U.S. Decennial Census

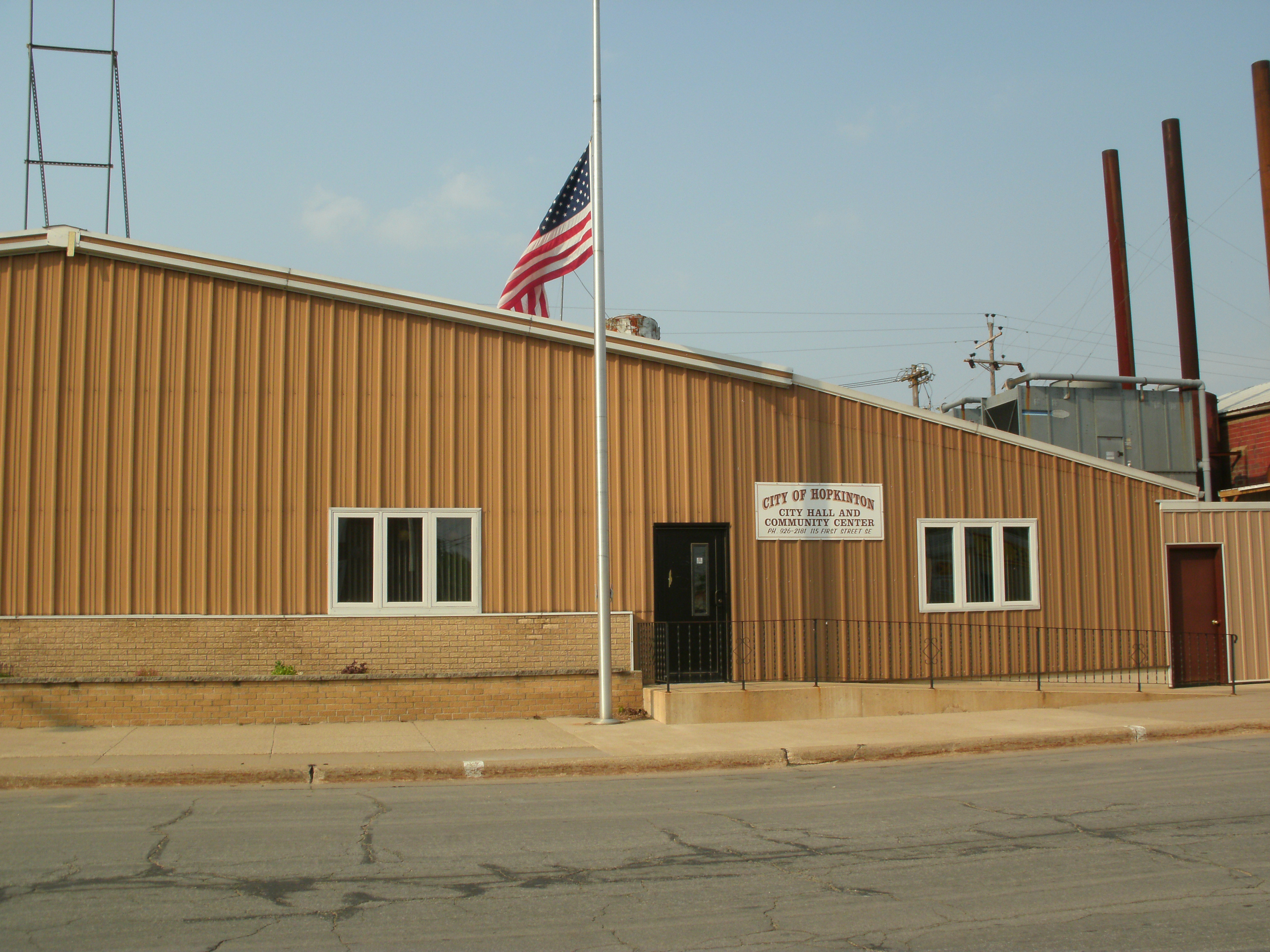
Hopkinton City Hall (2010)

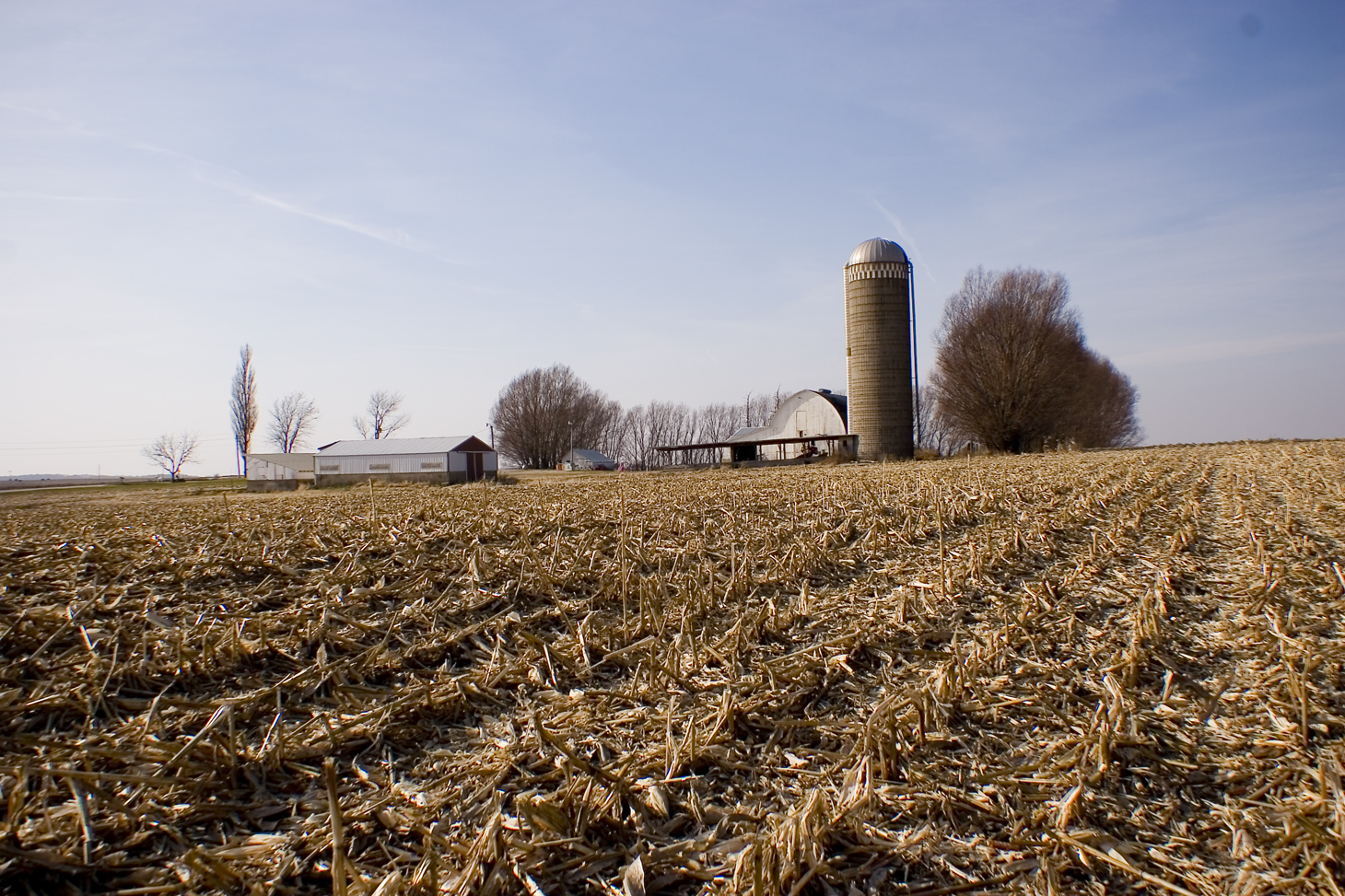
A farm near Hopkinton (2006)

=== 2020 census ===
As of the census of 2020, there were 622 people, 261 households, and 167 families residing in the city. The population density was 968.7 inhabitants per square mile (374.0/km^{2}). There were 286 housing units at an average density of 445.4 per square mile (172.0/km^{2}). The racial makeup of the city was 93.6% White, 1.8% Black or African American, 0.6% Native American, 0.5% Asian, 0.0% Pacific Islander, 0.0% from other races and 3.5% from two or more races. Hispanic or Latino persons of any race comprised 1.1% of the population.

Of the 261 households, 30.3% of which had children under the age of 18 living with them, 46.7% were married couples living together, 9.6% were cohabitating couples, 22.6% had a female householder with no spouse or partner present and 21.1% had a male householder with no spouse or partner present. 36.0% of all households were non-families. 28.4% of all households were made up of individuals, 11.1% had someone living alone who was 65 years old or older.

The median age in the city was 39.5 years. 28.3% of the residents were under the age of 20; 3.5% were between the ages of 20 and 24; 25.9% were from 25 and 44; 24.9% were from 45 and 64; and 17.4% were 65 years of age or older. The gender makeup of the city was 51.6% male and 48.4% female.

=== 2010 census ===
As of the census of 2010, there were 628 people, 266 households, and 185 families living in the city. The population density was 1,012.9 inhabitants per square mile (391.1/km^{2}). There were 294 housing units at an average density of 474.2 per square mile (183.1/km^{2}). The racial makeup of the city was 99.0% White, 0.3% from other races, and 0.6% from two or more races. Hispanic or Latino of any race were 0.8% of the population.

There were 266 households, of which 30.8% had children under the age of 18 living with them, 51.5% were married couples living together, 12.0% had a female householder with no husband present, 6.0% had a male householder with no wife present, and 30.5% were non-families. 25.9% of all households were made up of individuals, and 13.6% had someone living alone who was 65 years of age or older. The average household size was 2.36 and the average family size was 2.76.

The median age in the city was 43.8 years. 24% of residents were under the age of 18; 7.7% were between the ages of 18 and 24; 20.6% were from 25 to 44; 28.7% were from 45 to 64; and 19.1% were 65 years of age or older. The gender makeup of the city was 49.2% male and 50.8% female.

=== 2000 census ===
As of the census of 2000, there were 681 people, 275 households, and 187 families living in the city. The population density was 1,103.5 inhabitants per square mile (426.1/km^{2}). There were 292 housing units at an average density of 473.2 per square mile (182.7/km^{2}). The racial makeup of the city was 98.68% White, and 1.32% from two or more races. Hispanic or Latino of any race were 0.15% of the population.

There were 275 households, out of which 34.2% had children under the age of 18 living with them, 52.7% were married couples living together, 11.3% had a female householder with no husband present, and 32.0% were non-families. 26.9% of all households were made up of individuals, and 14.5% had someone living alone who was 65 years of age or older. The average household size was 2.48 and the average family size was 3.03.

In the city, the population was spread out, with 28.0% under the age of 18, 8.2% from 18 to 24, 28.3% from 25 to 44, 19.1% from 45 to 64, and 16.3% who were 65 years of age or older. The median age was 37 years. For every 100 females, there were 102.7 males. For every 100 females age 18 and over, there were 90.7 males.

The median income for a household in the city was $33,958, and the median income for a family was $42,589. Males had a median income of $28,333 versus $19,773 for females. The per capita income for the city was $13,707. About 3.4% of families and 4.9% of the population were below the poverty line, including 2.6% of those under age 18 and 7.2% of those age 65 or over.

== Education ==
The Maquoketa Valley Community School District operates local area public schools.

== Notable people ==
- Charles Merriam (1874–1953), professor of political science at the University of Chicago
- Frank Merriam (1865–1955), politician, governor of California
- John Merriam (1869–1945), paleontologist, conservationist.
