= John Campbell Merriam =

American paleontologist, educator, and conservationist (1869–1945)

John C. Merriam
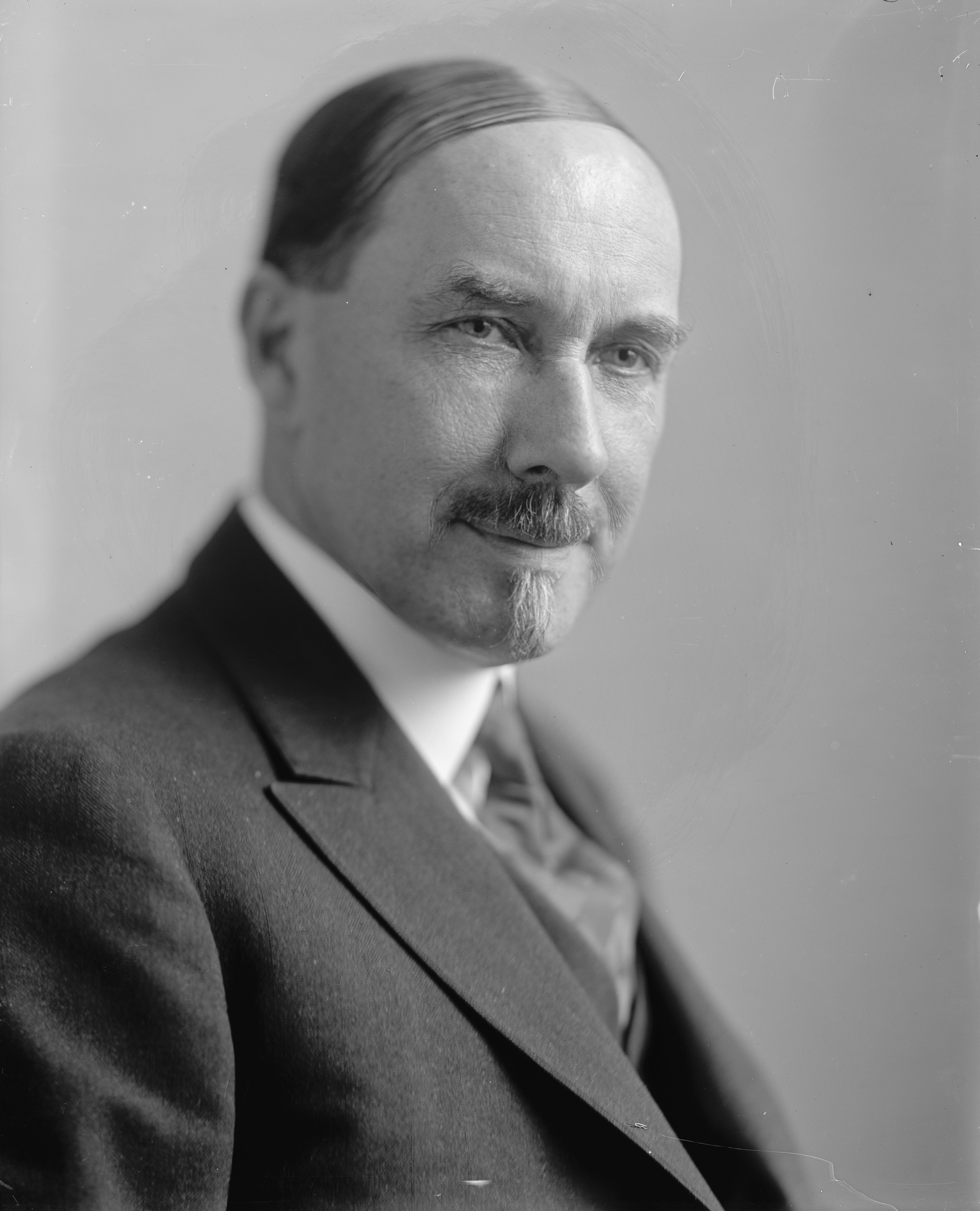
- Born: October 20, 1869; Hopkinton, Iowa, US
- Died: 30 October 1945 (aged 76); Oakland, California, US
- Education: Lenox College; University of California, Berkeley; Ludwig-Maximilians-Universität München
- Scientific career
- Fields: Paleontology, Education
- Workplaces: Carnegie Institution of Washington; National Academy of Sciences; Smithsonian Institution
- Doctoral students: William J. Sinclair

John Campbell Merriam (October 20, 1869 – October 30, 1945) was an American paleontologist, educator, and conservationist. The first vertebrate paleontologist on the West Coast of the United States, he is best known for his taxonomy of vertebrate fossils at the La Brea Tar Pits in Los Angeles, particularly with the genus Smilodon, more commonly known as the sabertooth cat. He is also known for his work to extend the reach of the National Park Service.

== Biography ==
He was born in Hopkinton, Iowa, the eldest child of postmaster, store proprietor, and American Civil War veteran Charles E. Merriam. His middle name Campbell was his mother's middle name, and the maiden name of his maternal grandmother.

Both his father Charles E. Merriam and his paternal uncle Henry C. Merriam had served as officers in the 12th Iowa Infantry, Company K; after capture at the Battle of Shiloh, they were sent to Libby Prison for some time before being returned to the battlefields. Eventually, when the two brothers were mustered out, they returned to Iowa, married, and raised families. As a young man, he began collecting Paleozoic invertebrate fossils near his Iowa home. He received a bachelor's degree from Lenox College in Hopkinton, Iowa, his father's alma mater, then went to the University of California to study geology and botany under Joseph Le Conte. He later went to the Ludwig-Maximilians-Universität München in Germany to study under the famous paleontologist Karl von Zittel. In 1894, he returned to the U.S. and joined the faculty at the University of California, teaching and performing research in both vertebrate and invertebrate paleontology.

In 1901, one of his lectures on paleontology inspired the young Annie Montague Alexander, who financed and took part in his expedition that year to Fossil Lake in Oregon. Alexander, who went on to a lifelong career as a paleontological benefactress, financed his subsequent expeditions to Mount Shasta in 1902 and 1903, as well as his famous 1905 Saurian Expedition to the West Humboldt Range in Nevada. During this expedition Merriam unearthed 25 specimens of ichthyosaur, many of them considered the finest ever found.

In 1903, he was recognized as an Associate Member of the Boone and Crockett Club, a wildlife conservation organization founded in 1887 by Theodore Roosevelt and George Bird Grinnell.

In 1912, he was appointed chairman of the Department of Paleontology at the University of California. That same year he began his famous studies of vertebrates at the La Brea Tar Pits. He and his students categorized many of the vertebrate fossils found at the site, and many more were placed in storage. The smilodon was later established as the California state fossil.

In 1914, Merriam was elected to the American Philosophical Society.

In 1918, he was elected to the United States National Academy of Sciences. That same year, he co-founded the Save the Redwoods League, which began significant preservation efforts after Merriam traveled the Redwood areas of Humboldt County, California in 1922 seeking to spare its old-growth the effects of logging he witnessed in Redwood forests closer to San Francisco. A biography, which details his efforts to preserve wild lands in California and throughout the United States, was published in 2005.

In 1919, Merriam served as president of the Geological Society of America.

In 1920, he was appointed Dean of Faculty at the University of California, Berkeley, but he left that same year to become president of the Carnegie Institution in Washington, D.C. His departure caused the university to combine the Paleontology Department with the Geology Department, angering Merriam's benefactress, Annie Alexander, who subsequently founded and endowed the university's Museum of Paleontology. As the head of Carnegie Institution, Merriam's administrative duties led to a reduction in his research for the rest of his career. He accomplishments as president included helping to advance the educational programs of the National Park Service, as well as helping to preserve the California redwoods. He was elected to the American Academy of Arts and Sciences in 1921. His published papers are collected in a four-volume set published in 1938 by the Carnegie Institution.

Merriam was a founding member of the Galton Institute and a cautious political supporter of eugenics.

Notably, his paternal first cousin Frank Merriam, the eldest child of Civil War veteran Henry C. Merriam, served as the 28th Governor of California between 1934 and 1939.

== Education and University Degrees ==
Bachelor of Science, Lenox College, 1887. PhD, Ludwig-Maximilians-Universität München, 1893.

D.Sc., Columbia University, 1921. D.Sc., Princeton University, 1922. D.Sc., Yale University, 1922. LLD, Wesleyan University, 1922. PhD, University of California, 1924. LLD, New York University, 1926. LLD, University of Michigan, 1933. LLD, Harvard University in 1935. D.Sc., University of Pennsylvania, 1936. D.Sc., State University of New York, 1937. LLD, George Washington University, 1937. D.Sc., Oregon State College, 1939. LLD, University of Oregon, 1939.

== See also ==
- Category:Taxa named by John Campbell Merriam
