= Martin Ignatius Welsh =

American judge

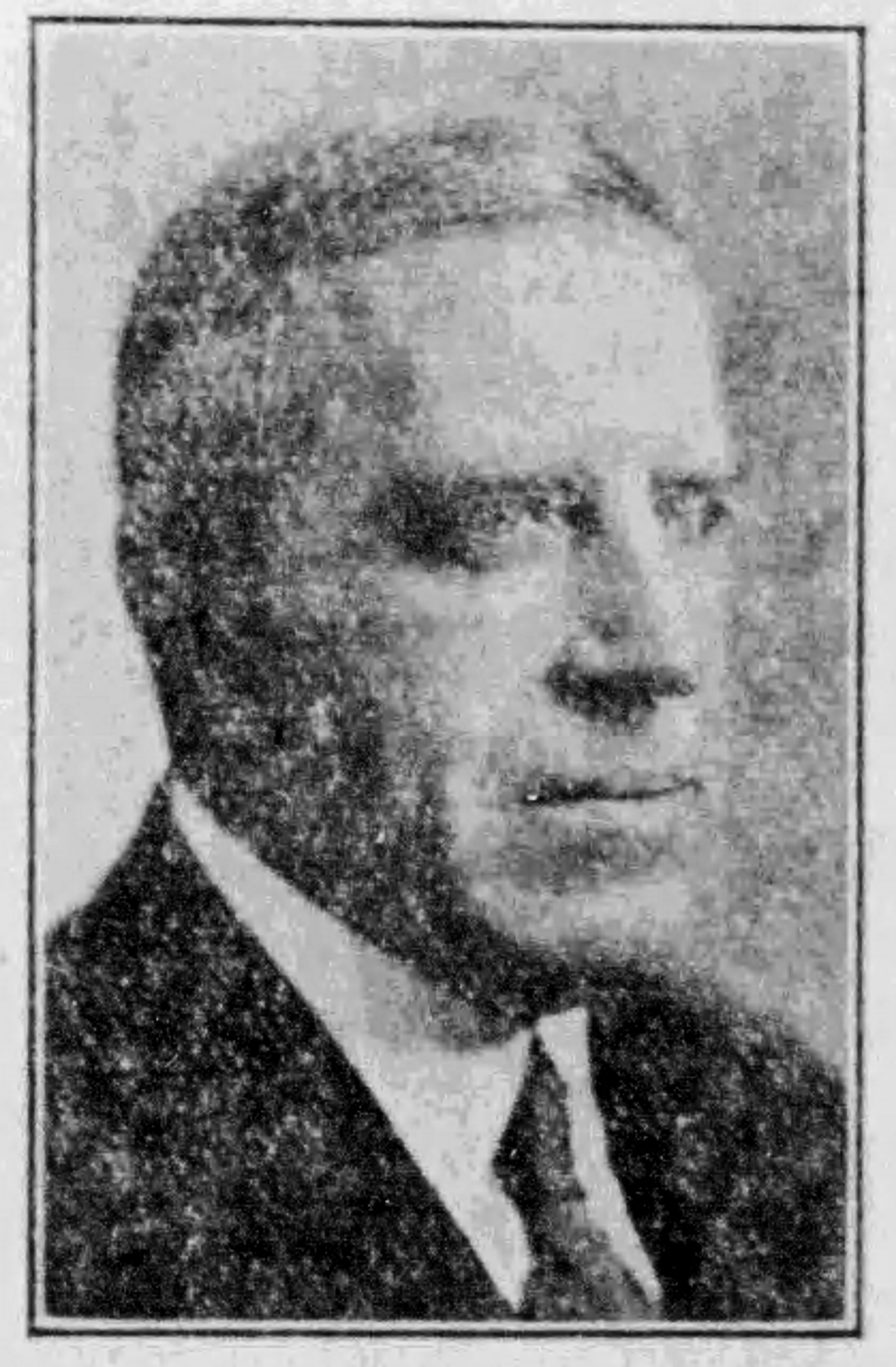
- Welsh c. 1928

Senior Judge of the United States District Court for the Northern District of California
- In office January 1, 1947 – January 4, 1953

Judge of the United States District Court for the Northern District of California
- In office July 14, 1939 – January 1, 1947
- Appointed by: Franklin D. Roosevelt
- Preceded by: Seat established by 52 Stat. 584
- Succeeded by: Dal Millington Lemmon

35th Mayor of Sacramento
- In office October 15, 1928 – January 3, 1930
- Preceded by: Ralph E. Conley
- Succeeded by: C. H. S. Bidwell

Personal details
- Born: Martin Ignatius Welsh; October 1, 1882 San Jose, California, U.S.
- Died: January 4, 1953 (aged 70)
- Party: Democratic
- Education: Reading law

Martin Ignatius Welsh (October 1, 1882 – January 4, 1953) was a United States district judge of the United States District Court for the Northern District of California.

== Education and career ==
Born in San Jose, California, Welsh read law to enter the bar in 1912. He was in private practice from 1912 to 1932, also serving as a deputy district attorney and a Superior Court judge of Sacramento County, California in 1914. He was a United States Commissioner for the United States District Court for the Northern District of California from 1914 to 1919. He served as a councilman on the Sacramento City Council from 1928 to 1929, and was Mayor of Sacramento from 1928 to 1930. He was a member of the Board of Education of Sacramento in 1931, and served as a Judge of the Superior Court of California County of Sacramento from 1932 to 1939.

In 1930, he was the Democratic candidate for Lieutenant Governor of California, losing to Republican candidate Frank Merriam.

== Federal judicial service ==
On June 21, 1939, Welsh was nominated by President Franklin D. Roosevelt to a new seat on the United States District Court for the Northern District of California created by 52 Stat. 584. He was confirmed by the United States Senate on July 11, 1939, and received his commission on July 14, 1939. He assumed senior status due to a certified disability on January 1, 1947, serving in that capacity until his death on January 4, 1953.

== Sources ==
Legal offices
Preceded by Seat established by 52 Stat. 584	Judge of the United States District Court for the Northern District of California; 1939–1947	Succeeded by Dal Millington Lemmon
