= Delaware County Historical Museum Complex =

Coordinates: 42.345°N 91.243°W

The Delaware County Historical Museum Complex is an open-air museum of nine buildings located on the grounds of the former Lenox College in Hopkinton, Iowa. It is run by the Delaware County Historical Society and was established in 1959.
