= Patrick O'Donnell (California politician) =

American politician

Member of the California State Assembly from the 70th district
- In office December 1, 2014 – December 5, 2022
- Preceded by: Bonnie Lowenthal
- Succeeded by: Tri Ta (redistricting)

Personal details
- Born: February 25, 1966 (age 60) Long Beach, California, U.S.
- Party: Democratic
- Spouse: Jennifer
- Children: 2
- Education: California State University, Long Beach (BA) (MPA)
- Profession: Teacher

Patrick O'Donnell (born February 25, 1966) is an American educator and politician who served in the California State Assembly. He is a Democrat who represented the 70th Assembly District, which encompassed the Los Angeles Harbor Region and portions of Long Beach.

Prior to being elected to the Assembly in 2014, he was a Long Beach City Councilmember and a teacher.

On January 5, 2022, O'Donnell announced that he would not be a candidate for reelection.

== 2014 California State Assembly ==
California's 70th State Assembly district election, 2014
Primary election
Party	Candidate	Votes	%
Democratic	Patrick O'Donnell	21,949	40.6
Republican	John C. Goya	17,367	32.2
Democratic	Suja Lowenthal	14,697	27.2
Total votes		54,013	100.0
General election
Democratic	Patrick O'Donnell	48,978	63.8
Republican	John C. Goya	27,755	36.2
Total votes		76,733	100.0
Democratic hold			

== 2016 California State Assembly ==
California's 70th State Assembly district election, 2016
Primary election
Party	Candidate	Votes	%
Democratic	Patrick O'Donnell (incumbent)	69,816	99.5
Republican	Martha E. Flores-Gibson (write-in)	328	0.5
Democratic	Billy Graham (write-in)	12	0.0
Total votes		70,156	100.0
General election
Democratic	Patrick O'Donnell (incumbent)	107,389	66.6
Republican	Martha E. Flores-Gibson	53,805	33.4
Total votes		161,194	100.0
Democratic hold			

== 2018 California State Assembly ==
California's 70th State Assembly district election, 2018
Primary election
Party	Candidate	Votes	%
Democratic	Patrick O'Donnell (incumbent)	41,480	59.2
Libertarian	Honor "Mimi" Robson	11,779	16.9
Democratic	Elliot Ruben Gonzales	9,304	13.4
Green	Rachel Alexandra Bruhnke	7,062	10.1
Total votes		69,625	100.0
General election
Democratic	Patrick O'Donnell (incumbent)	103,915	72.9
Libertarian	Honor "Mimi" Robson	38,706	27.1
Total votes		142,621	100.0
Democratic hold			

== 2020 California State Assembly ==
2020 California's 70th State Assembly district election
Primary election
Party	Candidate	Votes	%
Democratic	Patrick O'Donnell (incumbent)	48,589	72.3%
Republican	David W. Thomas	18,633	27.7%
Total votes			
