= Dal Millington Lemmon =

American judge (1887–1958)

Judge of the United States Court of Appeals for the Ninth Circuit
- In office April 29, 1954 – April 26, 1958
- Appointed by: Dwight D. Eisenhower
- Preceded by: Seat established by 68 Stat. 871
- Succeeded by: Gilbert H. Jertberg

Judge of the United States District Court for the Northern District of California
- In office February 7, 1947 – May 3, 1954
- Appointed by: Harry S. Truman
- Preceded by: Martin Ignatius Welsh
- Succeeded by: Sherrill Halbert

Personal details
- Born: Dal Millington Lemmon; October 29, 1887 Newton, Kansas, U.S.
- Died: April 26, 1958 (aged 70)
- Education: Stanford University (AB)

Dal Millington Lemmon (October 29, 1887 – April 26, 1958) was a United States circuit judge of the United States Court of Appeals for the Ninth Circuit and previously was a United States district judge of the United States District Court for the Northern District of California.

== Education and career ==
Born in Newton, Kansas, Lemmon received an Artium Baccalaureus degree from Stanford University in 1908. He was a law librarian for the California State Library from 1908 to 1910, and was in private practice in Sacramento, California from 1910 to 1933. He was a Judge of the Superior Court of Sacramento County, California from 1933 to 1947.

== Federal judicial service ==
Lemmon was nominated by President Harry S Truman on January 17, 1947, to a seat on the United States District Court for the Northern District of California vacated by Judge Martin Ignatius Welsh. He was confirmed by the United States Senate on February 5, 1947, and received his commission on February 7, 1947. His service was terminated on May 3, 1954, due to elevation to the Ninth Circuit.

Lemmon was nominated by President Dwight D. Eisenhower on April 6, 1954, to the United States Court of Appeals for the Ninth Circuit, to a new seat created by 68 Stat. 871. He was confirmed by the Senate on April 27, 1954, and received commission on April 29, 1954. His service was terminated on April 26, 1958, due to his death.

== Sources ==
Legal offices
Preceded by Martin Ignatius Welsh	Judge of the United States District Court for the Northern District of California; 1947–1954	Succeeded by Sherrill Halbert
Preceded by Seat established by 68 Stat. 871	Judge of the United States Court of Appeals for the Ninth Circuit; 1954–1958	Succeeded by Gilbert H. Jertberg
