= Frank Merriam =

28th Governor of California

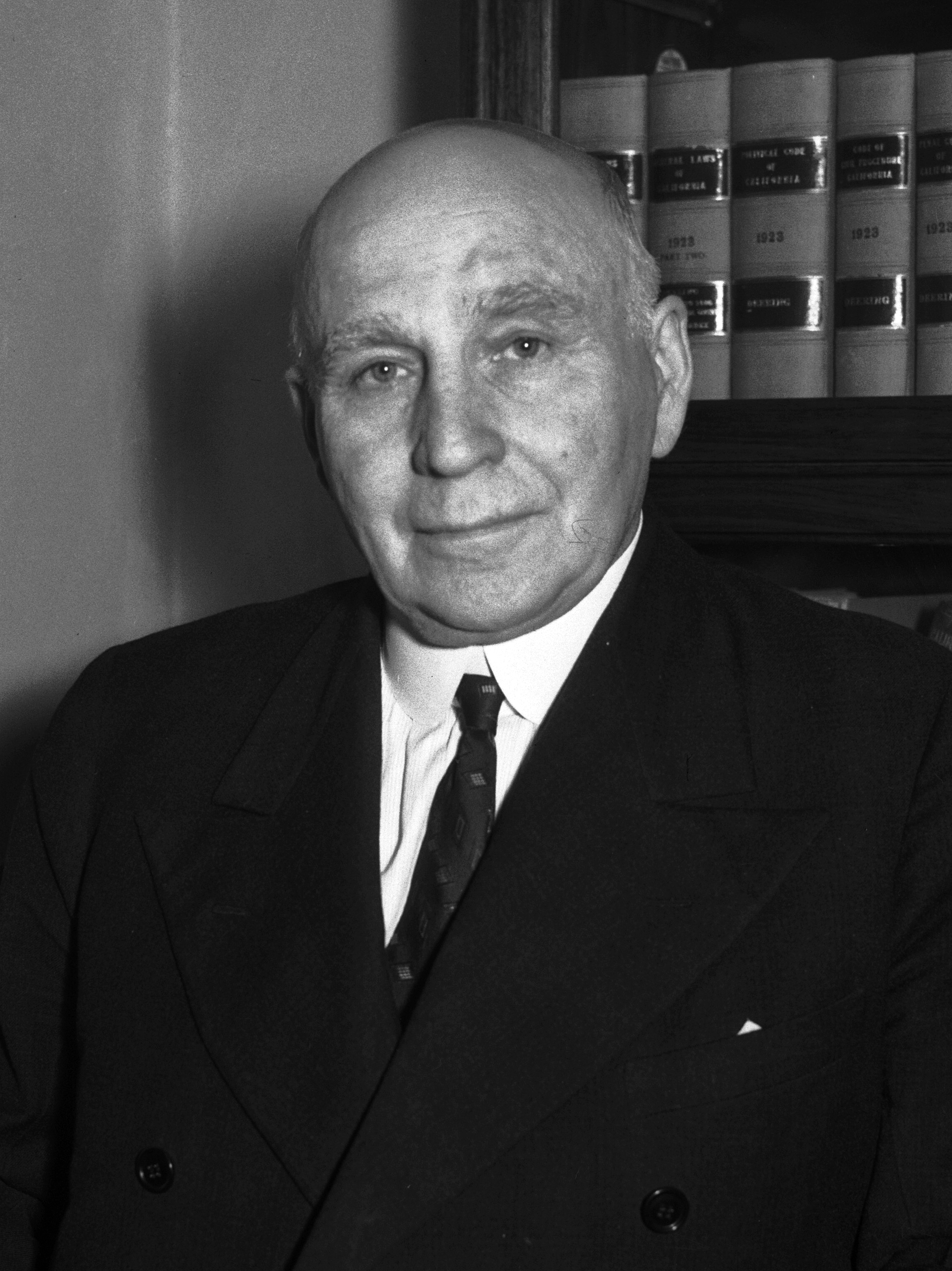
- Merriam c. 1934–1938

28th Governor of California
- In office June 2, 1934 – January 2, 1939
- Lieutenant: George J. Hatfield
- Preceded by: James Rolph
- Succeeded by: Culbert Olson

31st Lieutenant Governor of California
- In office January 5, 1931 – June 2, 1934
- Governor: James Rolph
- Preceded by: H. L. Carnahan
- Succeeded by: George J. Hatfield

Member of the California State Senate from the 33rd district
- In office January 7, 1929 – January 6, 1931
- Preceded by: Cadet Taylor
- Succeeded by: Ralph H. Clock

41st Speaker of the California State Assembly
- In office January 1923 – October 1926
- Preceded by: Henry W. Wright
- Succeeded by: Edgar C. Levey

Member of the California State Assembly from the 70th district
- In office January 8, 1917 – January 3, 1927
- Preceded by: Joseph A. Rominger
- Succeeded by: Morgan Keaton

17th State Auditor of Iowa
- In office 1899–1903
- Governor: L. M. Shaw; Albert B. Cummins
- Preceded by: Cornelius G. McCarthy
- Succeeded by: Beryl F. Carroll

Member of the Iowa House of Representatives from the 68th district
- In office 1896–1898
- Preceded by: D. H. Young
- Succeeded by: Bion A. Baker

Personal details
- Born: Frank Finley Merriam; December 22, 1865 Hopkinton, Iowa, U.S.
- Died: April 25, 1955 (aged 89) Long Beach, California, U.S.
- Party: Republican
- Spouse(s): Elnora Hitchcock (m. 1889; divorced) Mary Ella "Nellie" Day (m. 1901; died 1931) Jessie Millisack Lipsey (m. 1936; died 1948)
- Education: Lenox College
- Profession: Journalist, politician

Frank Finley Merriam (December 22, 1865 – April 25, 1955) was an American Republican politician who served as the 28th governor of California from June 2, 1934, until January 2, 1939. Assuming the governorship at the height of the Great Depression following the death of Governor James Rolph, Merriam defeated Democratic nominee Upton Sinclair in the 1934 election. Merriam also served as the State Auditor of Iowa from 1900 to 1903, and served in both the Iowa and California state legislatures.

== Early years ==
Merriam was born in 1865 in Hopkinton, Iowa, the eldest of 11 children. In 1861, his father Henry C. Merriam and uncle Charles E. Merriam enlisted in Company K, 12th Iowa Infantry. Both were captured at the Battle of Shiloh, held as prisoners of war at Libby Prison, and returned to Iowa.

After graduating from Lenox College at Hopkinton in 1888, Merriam served as the principal of the Hopkinton schools for two years and superintendent of schools at Postville for one year. He was a school superintendent in Wisner, Nebraska. He next became the editor of the Hopkinton Leader, a newspaper.

In 1904, he moved to Muskogee, Oklahoma, where he owned and published the Muskogee Evening Times. He moved to Long Beach, California in 1910 with his second wife, Nellie, to attend to family obligations. There he worked in the advertising department of the Long Beach Press.

== Iowa and California legislatures ==
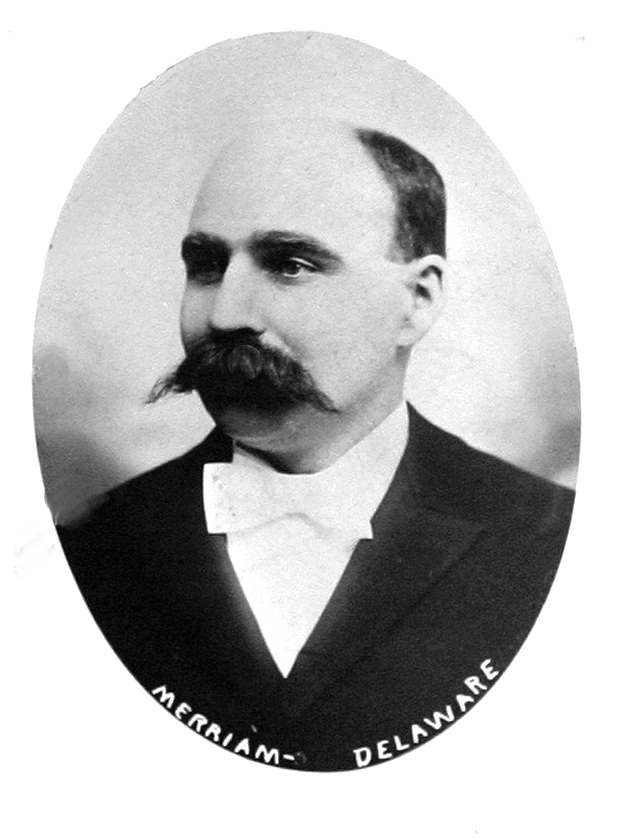
Merriam in the Iowa State House

Merriam was elected to the Iowa House of Representatives as a Republican at the age of 31 in 1896. Two years later, Merriam was elected as Iowa State Auditor, a post he would hold until 1903. In 1910 at the age of 44, Merriam moved to California. Following seven years of living in the state, Merriam was elected to the California State Assembly in 1916, representing the Long Beach area, beginning his rise in California politics.

In 1922, while still serving in the Assembly, Merriam presided over the successful election campaign of former Bull Moose member and Republican candidate for governor Friend Richardson. Name recognition from Richardson's successful campaign among fellow Republicans helped Merriam be elected by the Republican majority in the Assembly as its Speaker in 1923. During the 1926 general elections, Speaker Merriam ran as a primary candidate for lieutenant governor. However, state Republicans instead voted for Buron Fitts as the party's candidate for that office.

Following his departure from the Assembly that year, Merriam took a two-year hiatus from state politics. He returned in the 1928 elections after he was elected to the California State Senate. After two years in that body, Merriam won the nomination for lieutenant governor and, along with the Republican candidate for governor, San Francisco Mayor James Rolph, was elected to office in the 1930 elections.

== Governor of California 1934–1939 ==
On June 2, 1934, Governor Rolph was pronounced dead of heart failure at Riverside Farm in Santa Clara County. Upon the news of the Governor's death, Lieutenant Governor Merriam was sworn in as governor.

=== Longshoremen's strike ===
Nearly immediately after assuming the governorship, Merriam faced labor agitation, particularly by members of the International Longshoremen's Association on the docks of San Francisco. Beginning in May 1934, longshoremen along the West Coast walked off the job to strike, protesting against the ILA national leadership's negotiated settlements with transportation and cargo companies. Longshoremen demanded six-hour days, closed shops, and the right to unionize freely. Activity in the ports of San Francisco and Oakland ground to a halt. Teamsters soon joined the longshoremen in their walk-out. Popular support for the strikers also grew from various segments of the urban working-class, left unemployed by the Great Depression. By the strike's second month, violence had begun to break out along the Embarcadero as San Francisco Police clashed with the strikers during attempts to escort hired labor to the docks. Municipal officials accused the ILA's ranks of being filled with Communists and other left-wing radicals.

As governor, James Rolph had consulted with other West Coast governors such as Julius L. Meier of Oregon and Clarence D. Martin of Washington to bring in the U.S. Department of Labor in order to settle the dispute. After his unexpected death in June, these efforts were suspended. Furthermore, negotiations between the federal government and local ILA organizers failed to yield any agreement.

On July 5, 1934, as more attempts to open the Port of San Francisco were made by employers, hostilities between strikers, their sympathizers, and the police reached their zenith. On what came to be known as "Bloody Thursday," San Francisco Police shot tear gas at strikers and sympathizers on Rincon Hill, followed by a charge on horseback. Later, protestors surrounded a police car and attempted to overturn it but were met by gunshots in the air, and quickly afterwards, shots into the crowd itself. Later in the day, police raided an ILA union hall, shooting tear gas into the building and into nearby hotels.

In the weeks before Bloody Thursday, Merriam had remained updated on the ongoing labor dispute, threatening only to activate the Guard if the situation grew too serious. Behind the public scenes, however, the Governor had confided to fellow Republicans that ordering the Guard into San Francisco would ruin him politically.

Nevertheless, the events of July 5 proved to be a turning point. As reports of growing violence in San Francisco reached Sacramento, increasing by the minute, Merriam activated the California Army National Guard, deploying regiments to San Francisco's waterfront. In addition to the Guard's deployment, federal troops of the U.S. Army were placed on stand-by in the Presidio in case the situation grew beyond the Guard's control. Merriam also ordered the halt of construction on the San Francisco–Oakland Bay Bridge until the violence in San Francisco subsided.

By the end of the day, 1,500 Guardsmen armed with fixed bayonets and machine guns patrolled the waterfront, with an additional 5,000 state troops on reserve. Two men were killed. Explaining his decisions to the United Press the following day, Merriam placed full blame for Bloody Thursday on the political Left. "The leaders of the striking longshoremen are not free from Communist and subversive influences...There will be no turning back from the position I have taken in this matter."

Following the funerals of the two men slain on Bloody Thursday, the San Francisco Labor Council voted for a general strike. For four days from July 16 to July 19, the activity in the city ground to a halt. Mayor Angelo J. Rossi requested more Guardsmen in the city and, in meetings with generals, plans were drawn to impose martial law over the entire city. However, with a heavily armed National Guard presence along the waterfront, violence did not break out again. In the meantime, the police, now backed up by National Guardsmen, raided and arrested militant and radical offices of the International Longshoremen's Association (ILA) leaders and sympathizers. By July 19, the General Strike Committee and the Labor Council ordered an end to the strike, demanding its picketers to accept arbitration from the federal government. With the strike broken by its less militant leadership, longshoremen grudgingly returned to work.

Less than three years later, Governor Merriam was called upon to intervene in another labor dispute, the Stockton Cannery Strike of 1937 in which one person died and 50 were injured. Merriam refused to call up the National Guard this time, but in the wake of the violence he did play a significant role in mediating between the two sides to get the canneries open and save the $6 million spinach crop.

=== 1934 gubernatorial election ===
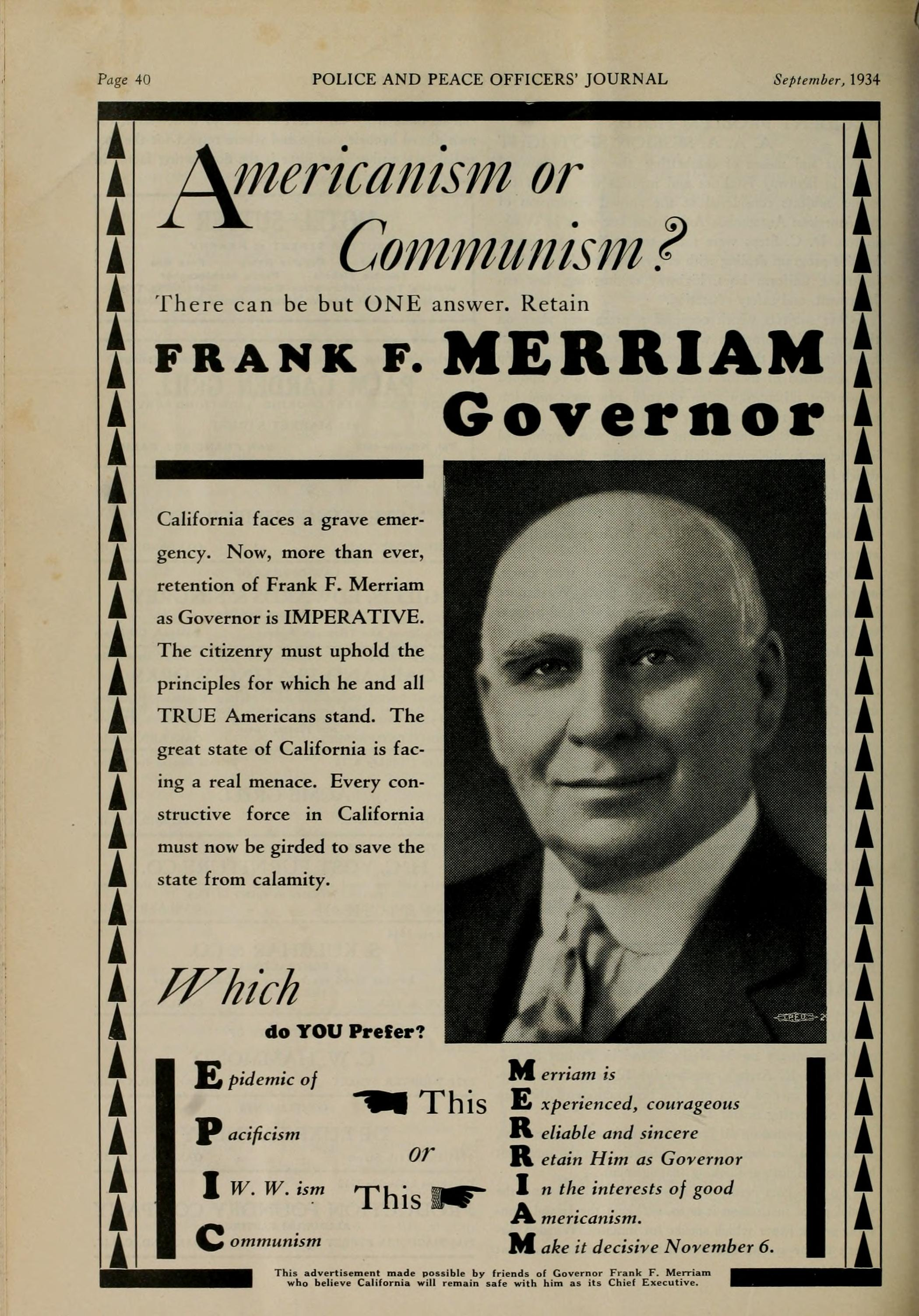
Advertisement from Merriam's 1934 campaign for Governor of California

In the aftermath of the Longshore Strike, Merriam was highly praised by the conservative San Francisco press for his perceived victory over the strikers. During the strike, state Republicans nominated the Governor to run for a full term in the general election that November. Merriam, however, had threatened not to deploy the California National Guard to San Francisco if the party would not nominate him.

Running against Merriam in the 1934 elections was former Socialist Party member Upton Sinclair, who had surprisingly won the nomination of the Democratic Party for governor. A third-party candidate, Raymond L. Haight of the Commonwealth-Progressive Party, also challenged Merriam.

During the campaign, Sinclair promoted the EPIC project, a socialist work program to ensure universal employment for all Californians, complete with the state control of factories, the opening of farm cooperatives and the creation of a cabinet-level California Authority for Production agency to oversee state employment.

The Commonwealth Party's Haight relied on centrists from the Democrats who believed that Sinclair had driven the party too far to the left.

Merriam's campaign rallied state conservatives into the so-called "Stop Sinclair" movement. Among supporters were MGM studio head Louis B. Mayer, media tycoon William Randolph Hearst, and Los Angeles Times publisher Harry Chandler. During the campaign, Mayer turned multiple studio lots in Los Angeles into propaganda machines, churning out fake newsreels to be played before feature-length films in the state. One notable newsreel included Soviets arriving in California to vote for Sinclair. Also during the campaign, Merriam frequented football games and public events, and on one occasion, attended a hospital talking to deaf mutes through an interpreter. Many such events were quickly publicized by the conservative press.

The result of the 1934 general election saw Merriam defeating Sinclair by 259,083 votes receiving 49% of the vote to Sinclair's 38%. Haight garnered 13%. After the election, Merriam announced that the result was "[a] rebuke to socialism and communism."

The 1934 general election is generally remembered as one of the most hotly contested elections in California history. It has also been cited by political historians as one of the first modern elections, due to the various uses of popular media and rhetoric to both popularize and demonize candidates.

=== Full Term ===
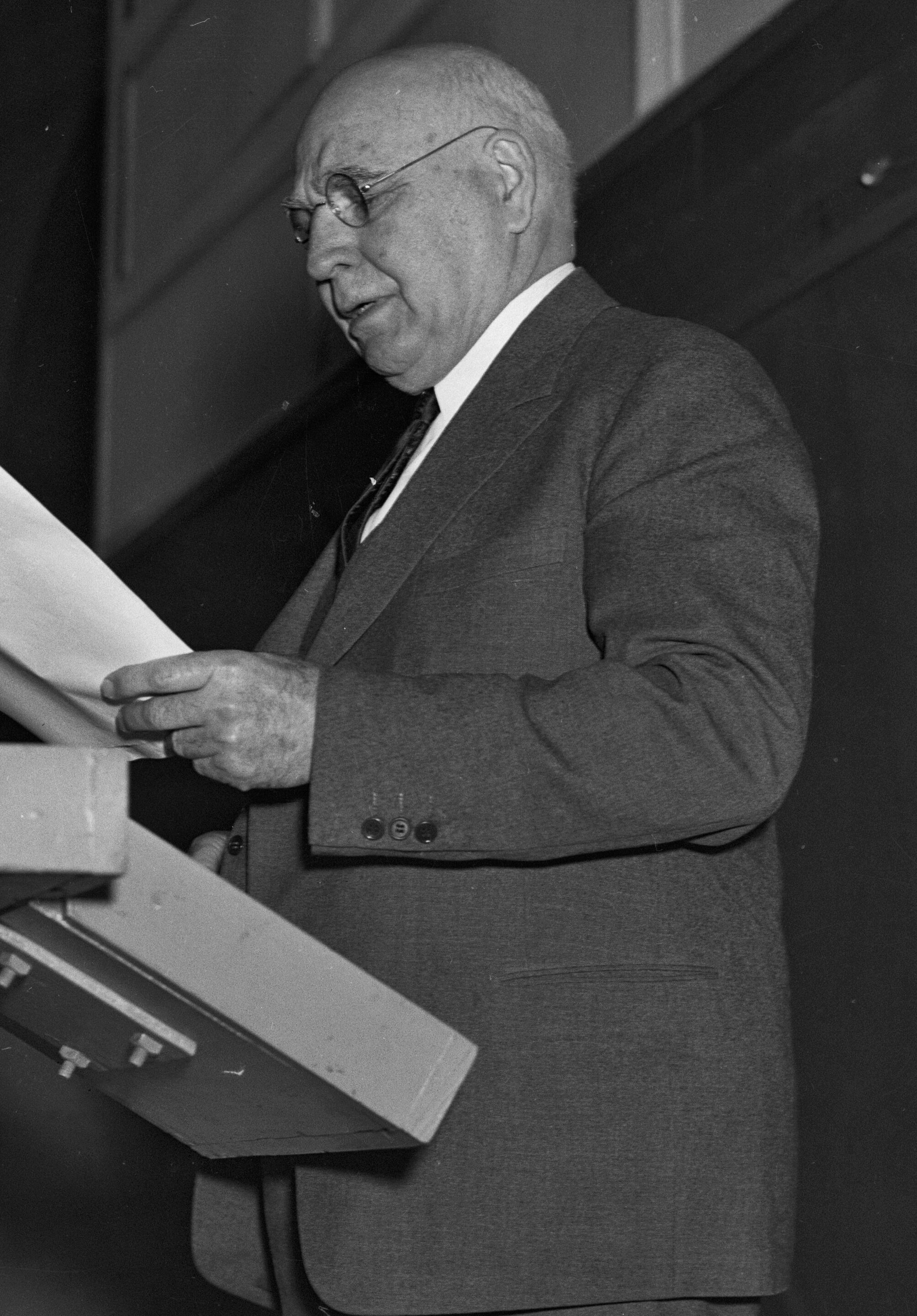
Merriam speaking at an Easter service, 1936

Upon beginning his full term, Merriam immediately faced an ever-shrinking state budget and growing deficit. In an effort that later angered many powerful conservative backers who had originally supported his 1934 candidacy, as well as challenging his own deep-seated conservatism, Merriam proposed to the Legislature a tax increase of nearly $107 million. The tax reform laws included instituting a state personal income tax modeled after the Federal Income Tax of 1934, which had been created by the Democratic-controlled Congress, and raising sales taxes to 3%. The Legislature agreed and passed the tax reform law in 1935. William Randolph Hearst, whose newspapers provided one of the bulwarks of the governor's 1934 campaign, complained bitterly over the reformed tax laws. The Hearst-owned San Francisco Examiner's editorial shortly after the reform bills' passage read: "extortionate and confiscatory taxation will mean ... devastation of business, paralysis of industry."

Fanning the growing rift between Merriam and conservative Republicans, right-wing author and playwright Charles Gilman Norris penned letters that became widely circulated thanks to Hearst's newspaper empire, complaining of Merriam's reforms. "The minute the proposed State Income Tax becomes law, my wife, Kathleen Norris, and myself will put both our homes — the one in Palo Alto and our ranch near Saratoga — up for sale and move out of the State. There is no alternative for us. We pay 52% of our income now to the Federal Government at Washington and under the proposed State Income Tax Law, we shall have to pay an additional 18%, so that out of every dollar we earn from our writings, 70¢ will go out in taxes!" Hearst supporters challenged Merriam's and the Legislature's 1935 reform laws in a special referendum in 1936 with Proposition 2. The proposition would automatically repeal the tax reforms and would in the future require the support of two-thirds of the Legislature and approval of voters by statewide referendum before any new income tax could be imposed. The measure, however, was defeated. While the State Senate was controlled by Republicans, the crucial lower house Assembly, where finance bills originated, was split between conservative and socialist-leaning Democrats. Merriam proceeded with appeasing the closely divided Legislature by praising the federal Townsend Plan, while complaining to conservatives and other capitalist supporters that he was surrounded by fanatics.

=== 1938 gubernatorial election ===
By the 1938 general election, Merriam had lost much support from the right due to the tax reform laws and support for Social Security, while he garnered little support or sympathy from the left due to his troubled relationship with labor unions and the squelching of the Longshore Strike. In the primaries, the Democratic Party nominated State Senator Culbert Olson, a former EPIC and Upton Sinclair supporter as well as an unabashed supporter of President Franklin D. Roosevelt's New Deal. Republicans, meanwhile, renominated Merriam for a second full term.

Merriam lost to Olson by 220,715 votes, ending the Democratic isolation from the governorship that had lasted for forty years beginning with the election of Governor Henry Gage.

== Post-governorship ==
Merriam resided in the Bluff Park neighborhood of Long Beach, California.

After his defeat, Merriam retired from public life. In 1941 he joined the California Society of the Sons of the American Revolution. Following the death of former Governor and U.S. Senator Hiram Johnson in 1945, a brief write-in campaign for Merriam appeared, though it only garnered 500 votes. He died at home in Long Beach of a heart attack, at age 89, on April 25, 1955.

California Assembly
Preceded by Joseph A. Rominger	Member of the California State Assembly from the 70th district 1917–1927	Succeeded by Morgan Keaton
Political offices
Preceded by Cornelius G. McCarthy	State Auditor of Iowa; 1899–1903	Succeeded by Beryl F. Carroll
Preceded by Henry W. Wright	Speaker of the California State Assembly; 1923-1926	Succeeded by Edgar C. Levey
Preceded by H. L. Carnahan	Lieutenant Governor of California; 1931–1934	Succeeded by George J. Hatfield
Preceded by James Rolph	Governor of California; 1934–1939	Succeeded by Culbert Olson
Party political offices
Preceded by James Rolph	Republican nominee for Governor of California; 1934, 1938	Succeeded by Earl Warren
