= William Orrick =

William Orrick may refer to:

- William H. Orrick Jr. (1915–2003), United States federal judge
- William Orrick III (born 1953), United States federal judge, son of William H. Orrick Jr.
