= Lloyd Burke =

Lloyd Burke may refer to:

- Lloyd L. Burke, (1924–1999), American Medal of Honor recipient
- Lloyd Hudson Burke (1916–1988), American federal judge
