= Contra Costa County Superior Court =

Branch of California superior court with jurisdiction over Contra Costa Country

Superior Court of California, County of Contra Costa
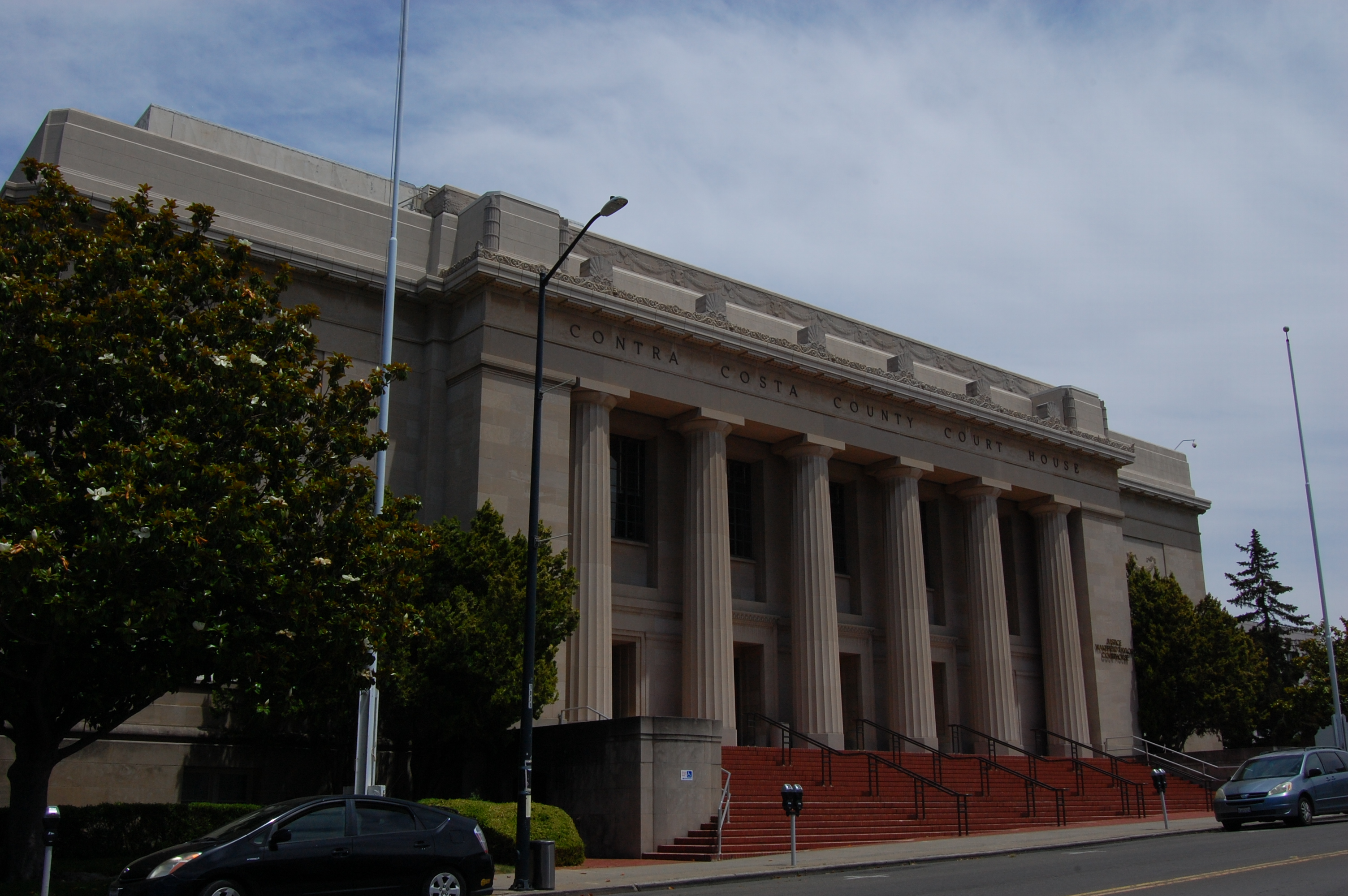
- Wakefield Taylor Courthouse, Martinez (2019)
- Established: 1850
- Jurisdiction: Contra Costa County, California
- Location: Martinez; Richmond; Pittsburg; Walnut Creek
- Appeals to: California Court of Appeal for the First District
- Website: cc-courts.org

Presiding Judge
- Currently: Hon. Christopher Bowen

Assistant Presiding Judge
- Currently: Hon. Joni T. Hiramoto

Court Executive Officer
- Currently: Sarah Lind

The Superior Court of California, County of Contra Costa, informally the Contra Costa County Superior Court, is the California Superior Court with jurisdiction over Contra Costa County. It has four courthouses: Martinez, Pittsburg, Richmond and Walnut Creek.

== History ==
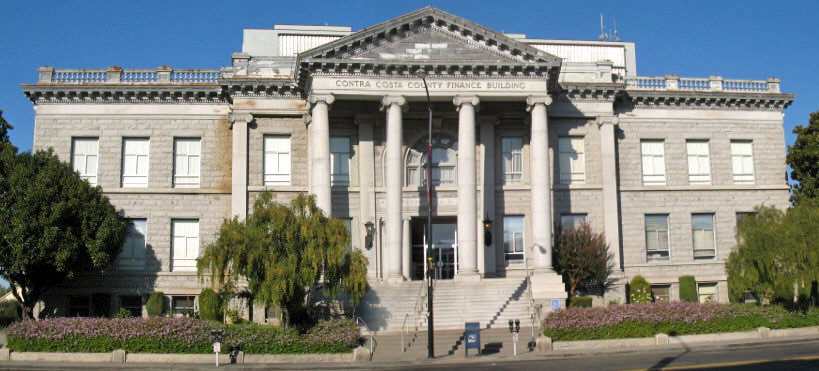
1901 Contra Costa County Courthouse, photographed in 2008

Contra Costa was one of the original counties formed when California gained statehood in 1850. The original courthouse in Martinez, the county seat, was condemned following the 1868 Hayward earthquake and a replacement courthouse was completed in 1901. Court functions moved to the Hall of Records (since renamed the Wakefield Taylor Courthouse) following its completion in 1933; the former (1901) and current (1933) courthouses were added to the National Register of Historic Places in 1989 and 1991, respectively.

The 1901 courthouse, adjoining jail, and 1944 jail annex occupy the block bounded by Court, Main, Pine, and Escobar streets. William H. Toepke and Charles I. Havens were credited as the architects for the courthouse, and William S. Mosser was the architect for the jail. Originally, the 1901 courthouse was surmounted by a cupola and dome, but this was removed following the 1957 San Francisco earthquake which had left the structure in a precarious state.

The 1933 courthouse, originally built as the Contra Costa County Hall of Records, occupies the block bounded by Court, Ward, Pine, and Main, adjacent to the 1901 courthouse across Main Street; it was built to add space for court functions, driven by the population growth of the county. The design is credited to architect E. Geoffrey Bangs, who had worked with John Galen Howard to design buildings for the campus of the University of California, Berkeley. Foundation work began on February 18, 1932; the cornerstone was laid on September 23, and the building was dedicated on April 9, 1933.

=== Judges ===
Samuel Conti was a Superior court judge in the Contra Costa County from 1968 to 1970, when he was appointed to the United States District Court for the Northern District of California.

On November 11, 2003, just days before he left office after an unprecedented recall vote, California Governor Gray Davis appointed Barry Goode to serve on the Contra Costa County Superior Court.

In June 2019, Judge John Laettner was found guilty of willful misconduct by a three-person panel appointed by the California Commission on Judicial Performance, upon its findings that he had "engaged in misconduct on numerous occasions over the past decade, making inappropriate comments to women and increasing a defendant’s bail without a hearing..." Deputy public defender Rebecca Brackman of the Contra Costa Public Defenders Association, was quoted by San Francisco Chronicle as stating that the outcome is an “overwhelming rebuke of Judge Laettner’s actions” and that “This sends a clear signal that judges need to uphold our community values of fairness, equity, and basic dignity and respect, regardless of gender, race, and background”. Laettner's attorney, James Murphy, maintained that the outcome was a product of a "smear campaign", having stated during the hearing on April 26 that "the public defender’s office from Contra Costa County was out to get Judge Laettner”.

== Venues ==
Contra Costa County Superior Court locations:
1 Wakefield Taylor Courthouse, 725 Court St (Martinez)
Spinetta Family Law Center, 751 Pine St (Martinez)
A.F. Bray Courthouse, 1020 Ward St (Martinez)
2 George D. Carroll Courthouse, 100 37th St (Richmond)
3 Richard E. Arnason Justice Center, 100 Center Dr (Pittsburg)
4 Walnut Creek, 640 Ygnacio Valley Rd (Walnut Creek)

The main courthouse complex is in Martinez, including two separate courthouses (named for Wakefield Taylor and A.F. Bray) and a Family Law Center (Spinetta). There are also three branch locations in Richmond (George D. Carroll), Pittsburg (Richard E. Arnason), and Walnut Creek.
