= Judge Orrick =

Judge Orrick may refer to:

- William H. Orrick Jr. (1915–2003), judge of the United States District Court for the Northern District of California
- William Orrick III (born 1953), judge of the United States District Court for the Northern District of California
