= 1974 California Attorney General election =

- November 5, 1974
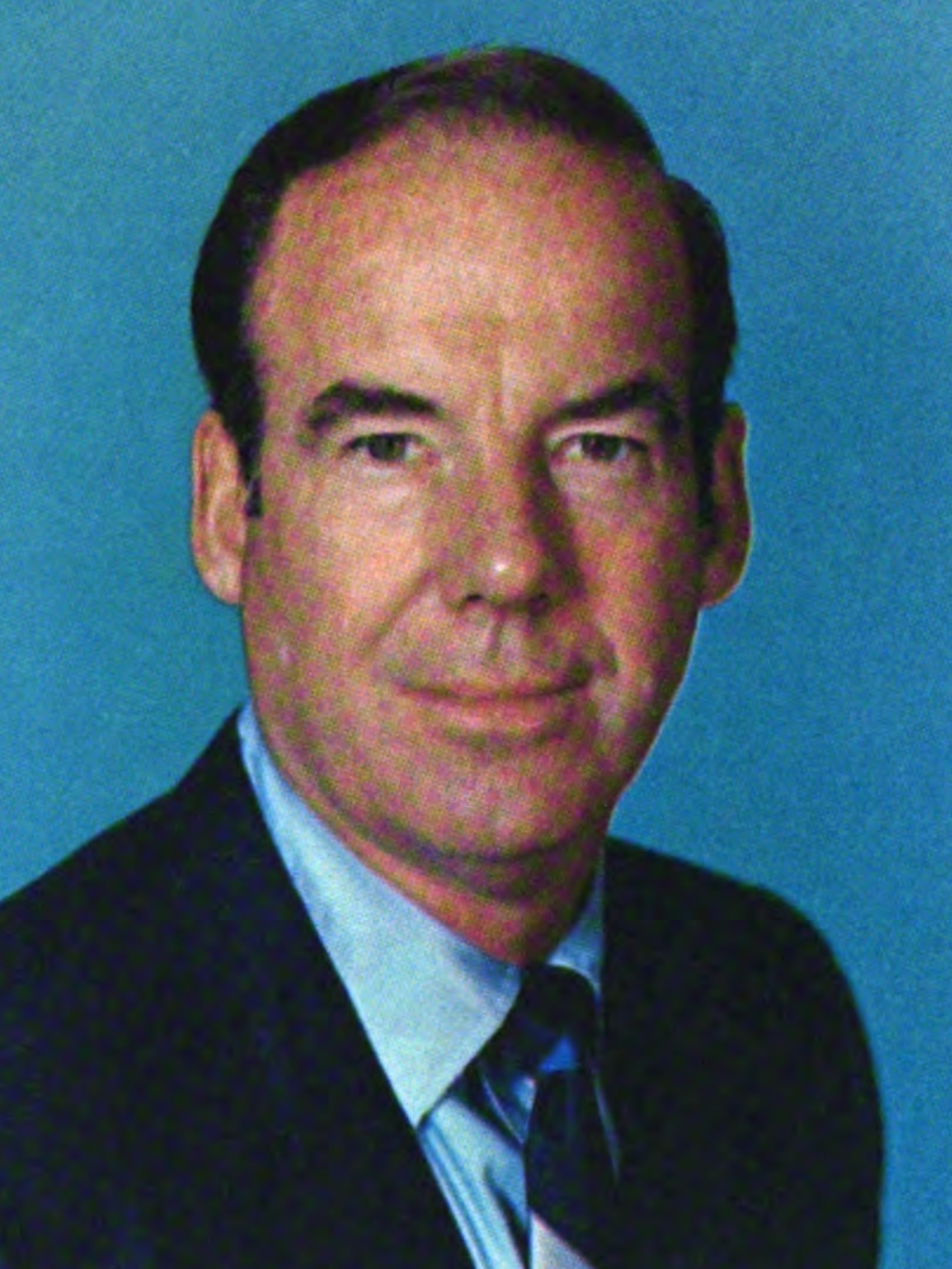

Nominee	Evelle J. Younger	William Albert Norris
Party	Republican	Democratic
Popular vote	3,312,125	2,707,998
Percentage	55.0%	45.0%
- County results Younger: 50–60% 60–70% Norris: 50–60%
Attorney General before election
Evelle J. Younger
Republican
Elected Attorney General
Evelle J. Younger
Republican

The 1974 California attorney general election was held on November 5, 1974. Incumbent Republican Evelle J. Younger defeated Democratic nominee William Albert Norris with 55.00% of the vote.

== Primary elections ==
Primary elections were held on June 4, 1974.

=== Democratic primary ===
==== Candidates ====
- Vincent Bugliosi, former Los Angeles County deputy district attorney
- William Albert Norris, attorney

==== Results ====
Democratic primary results
Party	Candidate	Votes	%
Democratic	William Albert Norris	1,409,793	57.66
Democratic	Vincent Bugliosi	1,035,179	42.34
Total votes		2,444,972	100.00

== General election ==
=== Candidates ===
- William Albert Norris, Democratic
- Evelle J. Younger, Republican

=== Results ===
1974 California attorney general election
Party	Candidate	Votes	%	±%
Republican	Evelle J. Younger (incumbent)	3,312,125	55.02%	
Democratic	William Albert Norris	2,707,998	44.98%	
Majority		604,127		
Turnout				
Republican hold		Swing		
