= Anna Ayala =

American fraudster

- Born: Anna Dalia Ayala; December 22, 1965 (age 60)
- Known for: Fraudulent lawsuit against Wendy's
- Status: Released
- Convictions: Guilty (2005): • Presenting a false or fraudulent insurance claim • Attempted grand theft of personal property over $400 • Grand theft of personal property over $400; No contest (2013): • Felon in possession of a firearm • Making a false police report
- Penalty: Nine years imprisonment (2005); Two years imprisonment (2013)

Anna Dalia Ayala (born December 22, 1965) is an American fraudster and convicted felon. She is most known for bringing a fraudulent tort claim against a Wendy's restaurant in San Jose, California in 2005. Ayala's claim is estimated to have cost the chain more than $30 million USD in lost revenue. Due to the potential lost revenue, Ayala was felony charged with attempted grand larceny, to which Ayala pleaded guilty in September 2005. She was sentenced to nine years in prison on January 18, 2006, and served four years. In 2013, she received another prison sentence for an unrelated incident regarding filing a false police report and felony firearm possession.

== Early life ==
Born in 1965, Anna Ayala grew up in Donna, Texas. Her mother was a seasonal farmworker and sent Anna and her three siblings to be raised by their maternal grandmother, who was also raising 10 other children; her father was a business owner and farm-worker contractor. Anna and her siblings had a strict upbringing; her siblings remembered her as being generous and kind as a child.

Around 1984, Ayala began cohabiting with a man with whom she had two children; they separated after about nine years without marrying. Ayala then moved to San Jose in 1993, opening a janitorial business. While in San Jose, Ayala "was sued by creditors over relatively small amounts of money" and filed nearly 13 lawsuits of her own.

In 1998, Ayala brought a lawsuit against San Jose-based La Oferta Review Newspaper for sexual harassment. The case was dropped. In 2004, she lost a suit against a San Jose car dealership, General Motors Corp. and Goodyear Tire and Rubber Company, claiming that a wheel fell off her car. The suit was dismissed with prejudice after she fired her attorney and failed to attend court or submit paperwork.

On her 39th birthday in 2004, Ayala married Jaime Plascencia, a construction and manual laborer, in Nevada.

== Extortion of Wendy's ==
On March 22, 2005, Ayala alleged that she had found a severed human finger in her chili con carne at a Wendy's location in San Jose. After an investigation by the Santa Clara County Medical Examiner's Office and the San Jose Police Department, it was determined that the finger did not come from a Wendy's employee, or from any employee at the facilities that provided ingredients for the chili. Though early reports suggested that the finger was "fully cooked", the Santa Clara County coroner's office initially concluded that the finger "was not consistent with an object that had been cooked in chili at 170 degrees (Fahrenheit) for three hours." The Las Vegas Metropolitan Police Department sent a team of about 12 officers to Ayala's home in Las Vegas, Nevada, on April 6, 2005, handcuffing Ayala and other people in the house. Ayala's 13-year-old daughter received a shoulder injury while being handcuffed. The Associated Press then revealed on April 8 that Ayala had previously filed numerous lawsuits against various businesses.

Las Vegas police arrested Ayala on April 21, 2005, the same day Wendy's completed its internal investigation finding no evidence that any employee was involved with the finger. Ayala was charged with felony attempted grand theft related to the Wendy's incident and grand theft over fraudulently obtaining $11,000 in 2002 from selling a San Jose mobile home that she did not own. In their criminal affidavit against Ayala, Santa Clara County prosecutors reported that the county coroner's analysis of the finger found no evidence that it was cooked in chili and that Wendy's estimated losses of over $30 million since Ayala first made her claim. Additionally, management of that San Jose Wendy's said that revenue declined nearly 50 percent as a result of Ayala's claims and forced the cutting of employees' hours. Immediately following the arrest, Wendy's held a promotion offering customers free Frosty desserts at Bay Area restaurants on the weekend of April 22 to 24. Wendy's followed up taking this promotion national for the weekend of May 13 to 15.

The San Francisco Chronicle confirmed on May 18, 2005, that the finger belonged to Brian Paul Rossiter, an associate of Ayala's husband. Rossiter had lost his finger in an industrial accident at an asphalt company in December 2004 and had subsequently sold the finger to Ayala's husband to settle a debt. On May 24, 2005, Ayala's husband Plascencia was charged by Santa Clara County with conspiracy to file a false charge and attempted grand theft with excessive damages, for his role in buying the finger and planning to plant it on restaurant food to set up an extortion. At the time of the charges, Plascencia was detained in Nevada jail on charges of unpaid child support.

On September 9, 2005, in Santa Clara County court, Ayala pled guilty to charges on conspiracy to file a false insurance claim and attempt grand theft related to the Wendy's case, and fraud related to the mobile home sale. Plascencia pled guilty to the same conspiracy and grand theft charges, in addition to charges from other cases on failing to pay child support, child abandonment, identity theft, and official document fraud. On January 18, 2006, Ayala was sentenced by county judge Edward Davila to nine years in state prison. Judge Davila also sentenced Plascencia to 12 years and four months in prison and ordered both Ayala and Plascencia to pay nearly $21 million in restitution to Wendy's. Ayala was subsequently banned for life from all Wendy's locations.

In her appeal to reduce her sentence, the California Sixth District Court of Appeal agreed with her claim that Judge Davila could not add five years for "aggravating circumstances" without corroborating conclusions by a jury and consequently issued an order on September 21, 2007, to resentence Ayala. In 2008, Ayala was resentenced to four years; she was released on parole in April 2009 and began living in San Jose.

== Aftermath ==
In 2013, Ayala made international headlines again after being sentenced to two years in prison for being an accessory to a felony, filing a false police report and being a felon in possession of a firearm. In October 2012, her son, Guadalupe Reyes, accidentally shot himself in the ankle. Reyes was not allowed to have the gun because he was on parole. Ayala filed a false police report, telling officers that her son had been shot in the ankle by two men. According to police, Reyes eventually cracked during questioning and admitted that he had shot himself, leading to his and Ayala's arrests.

In 2024, Ayala was briefly quoted by The New York Times in a story related to polling for the 2024 United States presidential election without disclosing her background. The Times later deleted the quotation.
