= Judge Friedman =

Judge Friedman may refer to:

- Bernard A. Friedman (born 1943), judge of the United States District Court for the Eastern District of Michigan
- Daniel Mortimer Friedman (1916–2011), judge of the United States Court of Appeals for the Federal Circuit and chief judge of the United States Court of Claims
- Jerome B. Friedman (born 1943), judge of the United States District Court for the Eastern District of Virginia
- Monroe Mark Friedman (1895–1978), judge of the United States District Court for the Northern District of California and judge of the Superior Court of California
- Paul L. Friedman (born 1944), judge of the United States District Court for the District of Columbia

== See also ==
- Abraham Lincoln Freedman (1904–1971), judge of the United States Court of Appeals for the Third Circuit
- Frank Harlan Freedman (1924–2003), judge of the United States District Court for the District of Massachusetts
