= Adolphus Frederic St. Sure =

American judge

Senior Judge of the United States District Court for the Northern District of California
- In office June 30, 1947 – February 5, 1949

Judge of the United States District Court for the Northern District of California
- In office February 23, 1925 – June 30, 1947
- Appointed by: Calvin Coolidge
- Preceded by: Maurice Timothy Dooling
- Succeeded by: Herbert Wilson Erskine

Personal details
- Born: Adolphus Frederic St. Sure; March 9, 1869 Sheboygan, Wisconsin
- Died: February 5, 1949 (aged 79)
- Party: Republican
- Education: read law

Adolphus Frederic St. Sure (March 9, 1869 – February 5, 1949) was a United States district judge of the United States District Court for the Northern District of California.

== Education and career ==
Born on March 9, 1869, in Sheboygan, Wisconsin, St. Sure read law in 1895. Under the tutelage of prominent Bay Area Republican politician Joseph R. Knowland, he eventually joined the Republican Party. St. Sure entered private practice in Alameda County, California from 1895 to 1923. One of his law partners during this time was J. Leonard Rose. St. Sure was city recorder for Alameda, California from 1893 to 1899. He was city attorney for Alameda from 1915 to 1917. He was a Judge for the Alameda County Superior Court from 1917 to 1922. He was an associate justice of the California Court of Appeal for the First District from 1923 to 1925.

== Federal judicial service ==
St. Sure was nominated by President Calvin Coolidge on February 16, 1925, to a seat on the United States District Court for the Northern District of California vacated by Judge Maurice Timothy Dooling. He was confirmed by the United States Senate on February 23, 1925, and received his commission the same day. He assumed senior status on June 30, 1947. His service terminated on February 5, 1949, due to his death.

=== Judicial philosophy and notable cases ===
St. Sure insisted during his early days on the bench that women be permitted to sit on federal juries, explaining he "had two years' experience with women jurors when I was on the superior court bench in Alameda County and found them conscientious, independent, highly intelligent, and willing to serve".

In 1939, lettuce workers in Salinas, California, were blacklisted by employers for their union activities. Attorneys provided by the International Longshore and Warehouse Union (ILWU) brought action and St. Sure, in the first instance of its kind, issued an injunction holding blacklisting to be illegal.

St. Sure was the federal judge who signed the order giving the United States Navy title to Treasure Island, California, after it formally served notice of its unilateral declaration taking ownership on April 17, 1942.

On September 8, 1942, the case of Fred Korematsu, a United States citizen of Japanese ancestry who had evaded authorities to avoid internment, was heard before St. Sure in San Francisco. Korematsu's conviction was eventually appealed to the United States Supreme Court and on December 18, 1944, the Court issued its landmark Korematsu v. United States decision.

== Personal life and death ==
St. Sure married Ida Laura Pettes in Alameda in 1897. He died February 5, 1949, and is buried at Mountain View Cemetery in Oakland, California.

Legal offices
Preceded by Maurice Timothy Dooling	Judge of the United States District Court for the Northern District of California; 1925–1947	Succeeded by Herbert Wilson Erskine
