= Beth Labson Freeman =

American judge (born 1953)

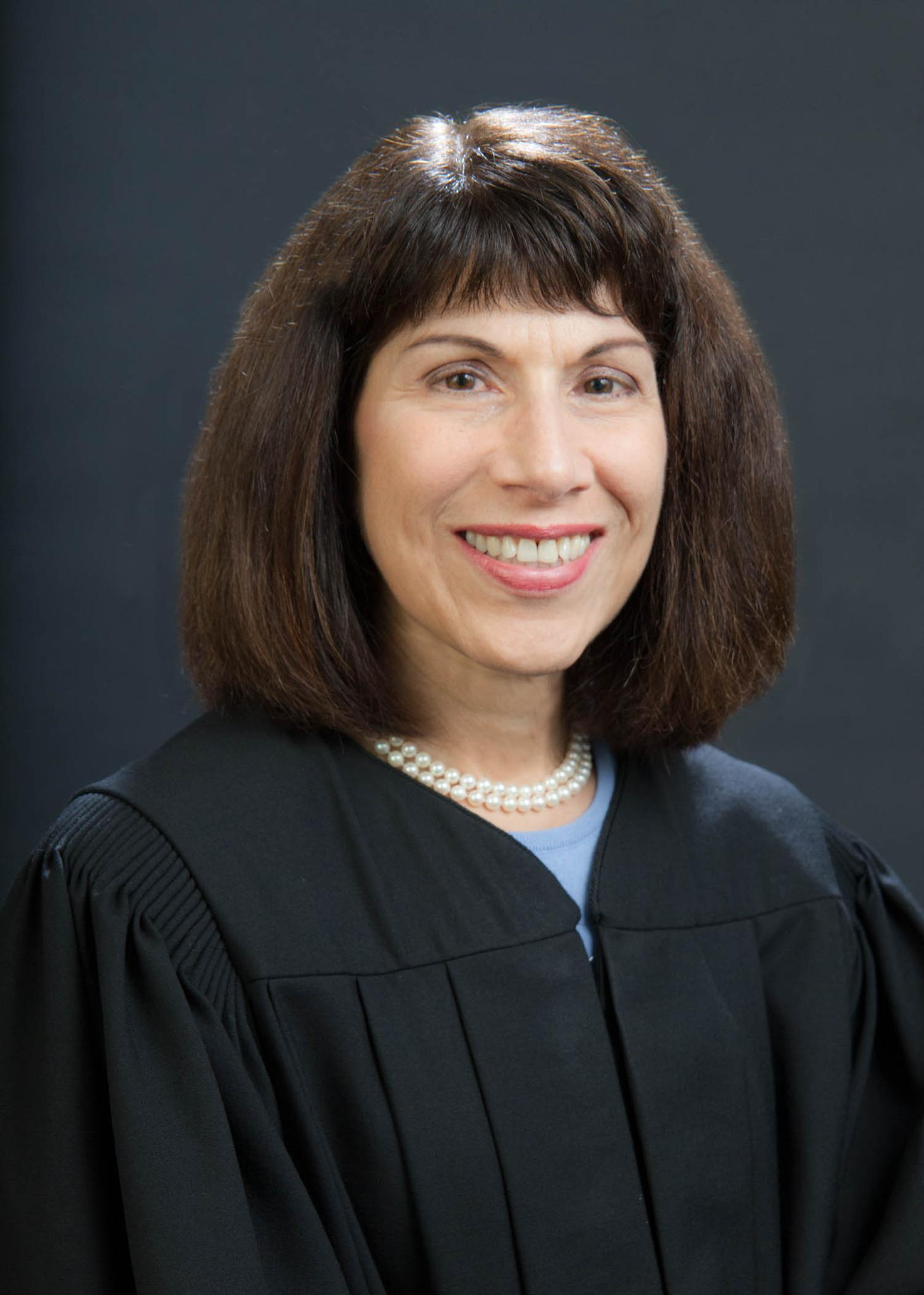

Judge of the United States District Court for the Northern District of California
- Incumbent
- Assumed office February 26, 2014
- Appointed by: Barack Obama
- Preceded by: Seat established by 104 Stat. 5089

Personal details
- Born: Beth Ann Labson; November 21, 1953 (age 72) Washington, D.C., U.S.
- Education: University of California, Berkeley (BA); Harvard University (JD)

Beth Ann Labson Freeman (born November 21, 1953) is a United States district judge of the United States District Court for the Northern District of California.

== Early life and education ==
Freeman was born Beth Ann Labson in 1953, in Washington, D.C. She received a Bachelor of Arts degree in 1976 from the University of California at Berkeley. She received a Juris Doctor in 1979 from Harvard Law School.

== Career ==
From 1979 to 1981, she worked at Fried, Frank, Harris, Shriver & Jacobson and from 1981 to 1983, she worked at Lasky, Haas, Cohler and Munter. From 1983 to 2001, she served as deputy county counsel at the San Mateo County Counsel's Office. From 1987 to the present, she has been affiliated with Peninsula Temple Beth El, a Reform Judaism synagogue where, prior to 2012, she served the community in various official capacities. From 2001 to 2014, she served as a judge on the San Mateo County Superior Court, serving as assistant presiding judge from 2009 to 2010 and Presiding Judge from 2011 to 2012. As a county judge, she presided over a broad array of civil and criminal matters.

=== Federal judicial service ===
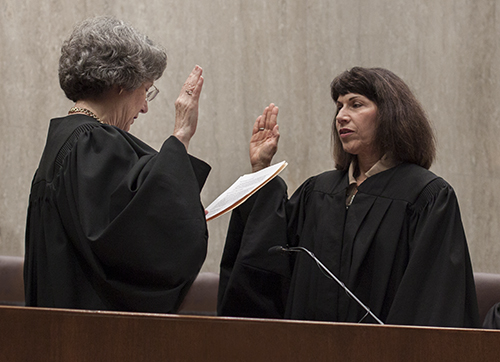
New District Judge Beth Labson Freeman receives the oath of office from Northern District Chief Judge Claudia Ann Wilken (April 24, 2014)

On June 20, 2013, President Barack Obama nominated Freeman to serve as a United States District Judge of the United States District Court for the Northern District of California, to a new seat created on October 3, 2011, pursuant to 28 U.S.C. 133(b)(1), following the appointment of Jeremy Fogel as Director of the Federal Judicial Center. On October 31, 2013, the Senate Judiciary Committee reported Freeman's nomination to the full Senate. After the first session of the 113th Congress ended, Freeman's nomination was returned to President Obama, who renominated Freeman in January 2014. The Senate Judiciary Committee reported Freeman's nomination to the full Senate on January 16, 2014. On February 12, 2014, Senate Majority Leader Harry Reid filed for cloture on Freeman's nomination. On February 25, 2014, the United States Senate invoked cloture on Freeman's nomination by a 56–42 vote, with one senator voting present. Freeman's nomination was confirmed later that day by a 91–7 vote. Freeman received her judicial commission on February 26, 2014.

=== Notable cases ===
On December 22, 2020, Judge Freeman handed down a nationwide injunction blocking enforcement of President Donald Trump's executive order barring federal contractors from training employees on various concepts rooted in critical race theory, finding the measure cuts into the constitutional freedoms of LGBTQ advocacy groups who filed a legal challenge. In her ruling, Judge Freeman wrote that the administration's directive to federal agencies to cancel training contracts involving “critical race theory,” “white privilege,” “intersectionality,” “systemic racism,” “positionality,” “racial humility,” and “unconscious bias” was likely unconstitutional.

On September 30, 2022, Judge Freeman issued a partial dismissal on two lawsuits (consolidated into one) against San Jose's gun control ordinance (which was enacted in response to the 2021 San Jose shooting) with leave to amend in part and without leave to amend in part. On July 13, 2023, she dismissed the consolidated lawsuit again with leave to amend in part and without leave to amend in part.

On September 18, 2023, she ruled that social media and technology corporations ability to collect data of users, including children, is protected speech, thus rendering a California privacy law unenforceable for unconstitutionality.

== See also ==
- List of Jewish American jurists

Legal offices
Preceded by Seat established by 104 Stat. 5089	Judge of the United States District Court for the Northern District of California; 2014–present	Incumbent
