= George Bernard Harris =

American judge (1901-1983)

Senior Judge of the United States District Court for the Northern District of California
- In office July 31, 1970 – October 18, 1983

Chief Judge of the United States District Court for the Northern District of California
- In office 1961–1970
- Preceded by: Louis Earl Goodman
- Succeeded by: Oliver Jesse Carter

Judge of the United States District Court for the Northern District of California
- In office July 9, 1946 – July 31, 1970
- Appointed by: Harry S. Truman
- Preceded by: Seat established by 60 Stat. 260
- Succeeded by: Robert Howard Schnacke

Personal details
- Born: George Bernard Harris; August 16, 1901 San Francisco, California
- Died: October 18, 1983 (aged 82)
- Education: University of San Francisco School of Law (LL.B.)

George Bernard Harris (August 16, 1901 – October 18, 1983) was a United States district judge of the United States District Court for the Northern District of California.

== Education and career ==
Born in San Francisco, California, Harris received a Bachelor of Laws from the St. Ignatius College School of Law (now the University of San Francisco School of Law) in 1926. He was in private practice in San Francisco from 1926 to 1941. He was a Judge of the San Francisco Municipal Court from 1941 to 1946.

== Federal judicial service ==
On June 18, 1946, Harris was nominated by President Harry S. Truman to a new seat on the United States District Court for the Northern District of California created by 60 Stat. 260. He was confirmed by the United States Senate on June 29, 1946, and received his commission on July 9, 1946. He served as Chief Judge from 1961 to 1970, assuming senior status on July 31, 1970. Harris served in that capacity until his death on October 18, 1983.

== Sources ==
Legal offices
Preceded by Seat established by 60 Stat. 260	Judge of the United States District Court for the Northern District of California; 1946–1970	Succeeded by Robert Howard Schnacke
Preceded by Louis Earl Goodman	Chief Judge of the United States District Court for the Northern District of California; 1961–1970	Succeeded by Oliver Jesse Carter
