= Edward Preston Murphy =

American judge (1904-1958)

Judge of the United States District Court for the Northern District of California
- In office December 21, 1950 – December 13, 1958
- Appointed by: Harry S. Truman
- Preceded by: Seat established by 63 Stat. 493
- Succeeded by: William Thomas Sweigert

Personal details
- Born: Edward Preston Murphy; March 13, 1904 Austin, Nevada
- Died: December 13, 1958 (aged 54)
- Education: Santa Clara University (A.B.); Santa Clara University School of Law (LL.B., J.D.)

Edward Preston Murphy (March 13, 1904 – December 13, 1958) was a United States district judge of the United States District Court for the Northern District of California.

== Education and career ==
Born in Austin, Nevada, Murphy received an Artium Baccalaureus degree from Santa Clara University in 1927. He received a Bachelor of Laws from Santa Clara University School of Law in 1928 and received a Juris Doctor from the same institution in 1932. He was a Professor of Law and Public Speaking for Santa Clara University from 1928 to 1932. He was in private practice of law in San Francisco, California from 1933 to 1942. He was a municipal judge in San Francisco from 1942 to 1945. He was a Judge of the Appellate Division of the Superior Court of California from 1945 to 1950.

== Federal judicial service ==
Murphy was nominated by President Harry S. Truman on December 4, 1950, to the United States District Court for the Northern District of California, to a new seat created by 63 Stat. 493. He was confirmed by the United States Senate on December 13, 1950, and received his commission on December 21, 1950. His service was terminated on December 13, 1958, due to his death.

== Sources ==
Legal offices
Preceded by Seat established by 63 Stat. 493	Judge of the United States District Court for the Northern District of California; 1950–1958	Succeeded by William Thomas Sweigert
