= John Slater Partridge =

American judge (1870–1926)

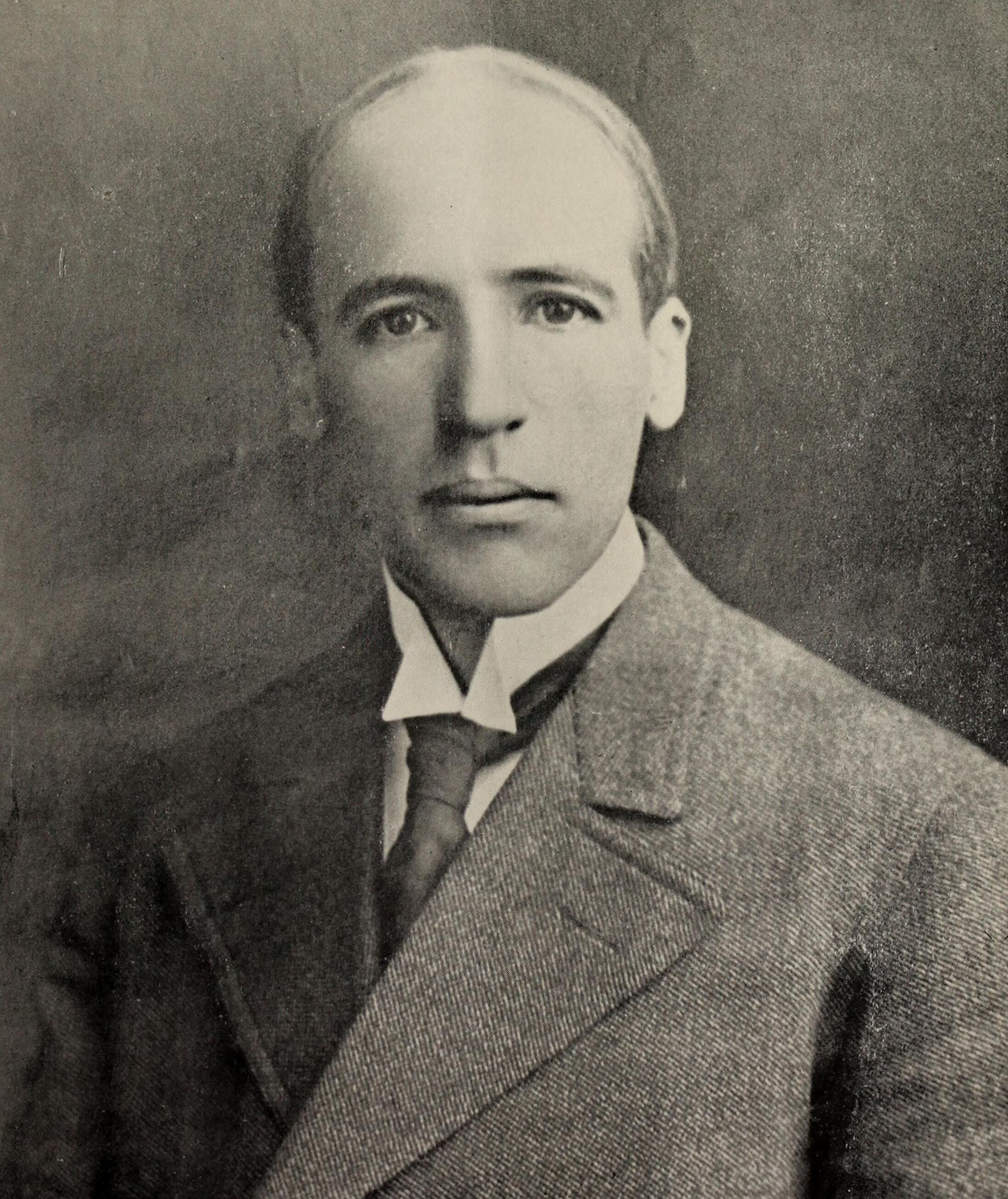
- Partridge c. 1905

Judge of the United States District Court for the Northern District of California
- In office March 3, 1923 – May 20, 1926
- Appointed by: Warren G. Harding
- Preceded by: Seat established by 42 Stat. 837
- Succeeded by: Harold Louderback

Personal details
- Born: John Slater Partridge; June 22, 1870 Susanville, California
- Died: May 20, 1926 (aged 55)
- Education: University of California, Berkeley (A.B., A.M.) read law

John Slater Partridge (June 22, 1870 – May 20, 1926) was a United States district judge of the United States District Court for the Northern District of California.

== Education and career ==
Born in Susanville, California, Partridge received an Artium Baccalaureus degree from the University of California, Berkeley in 1892 and an Artium Magister degree from the same institution in 1894. He read law to enter the bar in 1897, and was in private practice in San Francisco, California from then until 1904. He was an assistant city attorney of San Francisco from 1904 to 1905, when he ran unsuccessfully for mayor against Eugene Schmitz, and returned to his private practice from 1906 to 1923.

== Federal judicial service ==
On March 2, 1923, Partridge was nominated by President Warren G. Harding to a new seat on the United States District Court for the Northern District of California created by 42 Stat. 837. He was confirmed by the United States Senate on March 3, 1923, and received his commission the same day. Partridge served in that capacity until his death on May 20, 1926.

== Sources ==
Legal offices
Preceded by Seat established by 42 Stat. 837	Judge of the United States District Court for the Northern District of California; 1923–1926	Succeeded by Harold Louderback
