= John P. Vukasin Jr. =

American judge (1928–1993)

Judge of the United States District Court for the Northern District of California
- In office September 20, 1983 – September 20, 1993
- Appointed by: Ronald Reagan
- Preceded by: Stanley Alexander Weigel
- Succeeded by: Maxine M. Chesney

Personal details
- Born: John P. Vukasin Jr. May 25, 1928 Oakland, California, U.S.
- Died: September 20, 1993 (aged 65)
- Education: University of California, Berkeley (BA, LLB)

John Peter Vukasin Jr. (May 25, 1928 – September 20, 1993) was a United States district judge of the United States District Court for the Northern District of California.

== Education and career ==
He was born in Oakland, California and graduated from Fremont High School. He received an Artium Baccalaureus degree from the University of California, Berkeley in 1950 and a Bachelor of Laws from the University of California, Berkeley School of Law in 1956.

He was in the United States Army from January 1951 to 1953 and was stationed at Fort Ord, California, where he completed basic training and became an instructor with the 6th Division Faculty of the 6th Infantry Division. He became a corporal.

He was a trial attorney of the Division of Highways, Department of Public Works, State of California from 1956 to 1957. He was in private practice in San Francisco, California in 1958, and in Oakland from 1959 to 1968. He was a Commissioner of the California Public Utilities Commission from 1969 to 1974. He was a judge of the California Superior Court from 1974 to 1983.

== Federal judicial service ==
On September 13, 1983, Vukasin was nominated by President Ronald Reagan to a seat on the United States District Court for the Northern District of California vacated by Judge Stanley Alexander Weigel. Vukasin was confirmed by the United States Senate on September 20, 1983, and received his commission the same day. He served until his death of cancer, on September 20, 1993, exactly ten years to the day after he received his commission.

== Sources ==
Legal offices
Preceded by Stanley Alexander Weigel	Judge of the United States District Court for the Northern District of California; 1983–1993	Succeeded by Maxine M. Chesney
