= Stanley Alexander Weigel =

American judge from California (1905–1999)

Senior Judge of the United States District Court for the Northern District of California
- In office October 9, 1982 – September 30, 1997

Judge of the United States District Court for the Northern District of California
- In office August 15, 1962 – October 9, 1982
- Appointed by: John F. Kennedy
- Preceded by: Louis Earl Goodman
- Succeeded by: John P. Vukasin Jr.

Personal details
- Born: Stanley Alexander Weigel; December 9, 1905 Helena, Montana
- Died: September 1, 1999 (aged 93) San Francisco, California
- Education: Stanford University (BA, JD)

Stanley Alexander Weigel (December 9, 1905 – September 1, 1999) was a United States district judge of the United States District Court for the Northern District of California.

== Education and career ==
Born in Helena, Montana, Weigel was raised in San Francisco, California and attended Lowell High School. He received an Artium Baccalaureus degree from Stanford University in 1926 and a Juris Doctor from Stanford Law School in 1928. He was in private practice in San Francisco from 1928 to 1962. He was a United States Naval Reserve Lieutenant during World War II, from 1943 to 1945. He was a nonresident lecturer at Stanford Law School beginning in 1952.

=== Notable clients ===
In 1949, Weigel represented a group of professors at the University of California dismissed for refusing to sign an anti-Communist loyalty oath.

== Federal judicial service ==
Weigel was nominated by President John F. Kennedy on July 6, 1962, to a seat on the United States District Court for the Northern District of California vacated by Judge Louis Earl Goodman. He was confirmed by the United States Senate on August 9, 1962, and received his commission on August 15, 1962. He was a member of the Judicial Panel on Multidistrict Litigation from 1968 to 1979. He was a Judge of the Temporary Emergency Court of Appeals from 1980 to 1993. He assumed senior status on October 9, 1982. Weigel retired September 30, 1997.

== Personal life ==
In April 1940, Weigel married Anne Kauffman, and they had two daughters. He died on September 1, 1999, in San Francisco.

== Sources ==
Legal offices
Preceded by Louis Earl Goodman	Judge of the United States District Court for the Northern District of California; 1962–1982	Succeeded by John P. Vukasin Jr.
