= Edward Davila =

American federal judge (born 1952)

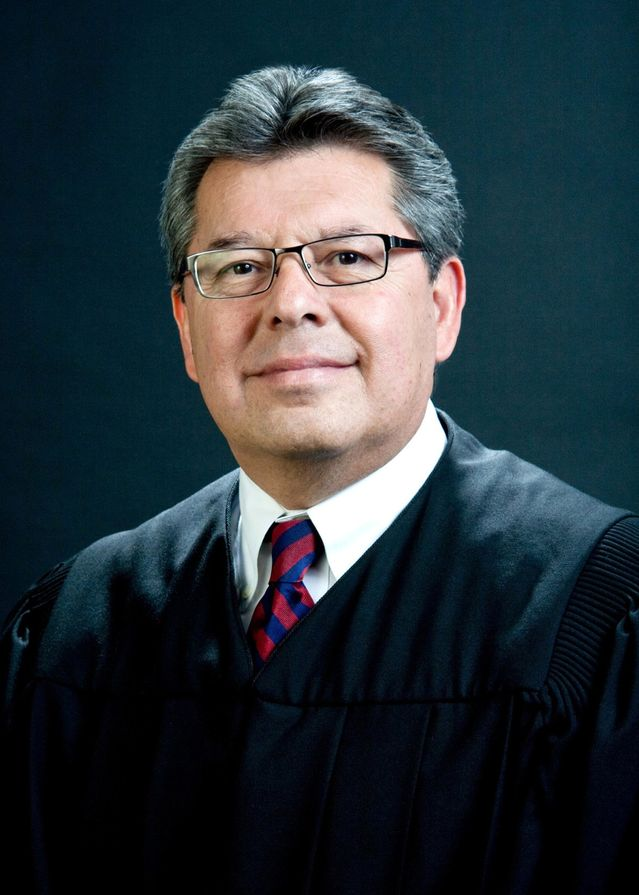
- Official portrait, 2011

Senior Judge of the United States District Court for the Northern District of California
- Incumbent
- Assumed office December 11, 2024

Judge of the United States District Court for the Northern District of California
- In office March 3, 2011 – December 11, 2024
- Appointed by: Barack Obama
- Preceded by: Marilyn Hall Patel
- Succeeded by: Noël Wise

Judge of the Santa Clara County Superior Court
- In office August 8, 2001 – March 3, 2011
- Appointed by: Gray Davis
- Preceded by: Donald Clark
- Succeeded by: Allison Danner

Personal details
- Born: Edward John Davila; June 21, 1952 (age 73) Palo Alto, California, U.S.
- Spouse: Mary Greenwood
- Education: San Diego State University (BA); University of California, Hastings; College of the Law (JD)

Edward John Davila (born June 21, 1952) is an American lawyer and jurist who serves as a senior United States district judge of the United States District Court for the Northern District of California. He was appointed in 2011 by President Barack Obama. Davila was previously a California state court judge of the Santa Clara County Superior Court from 2001 to 2011.

== Early life and education ==
Davila was born in Palo Alto, California. He received a Bachelor of Arts from San Diego State University in 1976. He then attended the University of California, Hastings College of the Law and earned his Juris Doctor in 1979.

== Legal career ==
From 1981 to 1988, he served as a deputy public defender in the Santa Clara County Public Defender's Office and later in private practice at the law firm of Davila & Polverino from 1988 to 2001.

== Judicial career ==
=== State judicial service ===
On August 8, 2001, Governor Gray Davis appointed Davila to serve as a judge on the Superior Court of Santa Clara County. Davila replaced Judge Donald Clark.

While a superior court judge, Davila presided over the high-profile case of a Las Vegas couple, Anna Ayala and Jaime Placencia, who planted a severed human finger in a bowl of Wendy's chili. On January 18, 2006, Davila sentenced Ayala to nine years in prison and Placencia to 12 years and 4 months in prison. However, the Sixth District California Court of Appeal ordered Davila to resentence Ayala in 2007 on the grounds that Davila improperly added years to the sentence based on extenuating circumstances without a jury's findings. Davila subsequently modified the sentence to four years in 2008.

=== Federal judicial service ===
During the 111th Congress, Senator Barbara Boxer recommended Davila to fill the United States District Court for the Northern District of California vacancy created by Judge Marilyn Hall Patel, who assumed senior status. On May 20, 2010, President Barack Obama formally nominated Davila to the Northern District of California. The Senate Judiciary Committee recommended his confirmation on December 1, 2010, but the Senate decided to recess without confirming him. Obama renominated Davila on January 5, 2011. That nomination was approved by the Judiciary Committee on February 3, and he was confirmed by the Senate on February 14, 2011, by a 93–0 vote. He received his commission on March 3, 2011. He assumed senior status on December 11, 2024, when his successor was confirmed.

Davila presided over the criminal trial of former Theranos CEO Elizabeth Holmes and COO Sunny Balwani. Holmes was found guilty on four counts on fraud in January 2022 and sentenced to 11.25 years (135 months) in prison on November 18, 2022, while Balwani was convicted of 12 counts of fraud in July 2022 and sentenced to nearly 13 years (155 months) in prison on December 7, 2022.

== Personal life ==
Davila is married to Mary Greenwood, who formerly served as Santa Clara County Public Defender and is presiding justice of the California Court of Appeal for the Sixth District. They reside in Menlo Park, California.

== See also ==
- List of Hispanic and Latino American jurists

Legal offices
Preceded by Marilyn Hall Patel	Judge of the United States District Court for the Northern District of California; 2011–2024	Succeeded by Noël Wise
