= Oliver Deveta Hamlin Jr. =

American judge (1892–1973)

Senior Judge of the United States Court of Appeals for the Ninth Circuit
- In office September 5, 1963 – December 28, 1973

Judge of the United States Court of Appeals for the Ninth Circuit
- In office March 26, 1958 – September 5, 1963
- Appointed by: Dwight D. Eisenhower
- Preceded by: William Denman
- Succeeded by: Walter Raleigh Ely Jr.

Judge of the United States District Court for the Northern District of California
- In office August 3, 1953 – April 15, 1958
- Appointed by: Dwight D. Eisenhower
- Preceded by: Monroe Mark Friedman
- Succeeded by: Lloyd Hudson Burke

Personal details
- Born: Oliver Deveta Hamlin Jr. November 30, 1892 Oakland, California
- Died: December 28, 1973 (aged 81)
- Education: University of California, Berkeley (BL)

Oliver Deveta Hamlin Jr. (November 30, 1892 – December 28, 1973) was a United States circuit judge of the United States Court of Appeals for the Ninth Circuit and previously was a United States district judge of the United States District Court for the Northern District of California.

== Education and career ==
Born in Oakland, California, Hamlin received a Bachelor of Laws from the University of California, Berkeley in 1914. He was a deputy district attorney of Alameda County, California from 1915 to 1920, and was in private practice in Oakland from 1920 to 1947. He was a Judge of the Alameda County Superior Court from 1947 to 1953.

== Federal judicial service ==
Hamlin was nominated by President Dwight D. Eisenhower on July 23, 1953, to a seat on the United States District Court for the Northern District of California vacated by Judge Monroe Mark Friedman. He was confirmed by the United States Senate on August 1, 1953, and received his commission on August 3, 1953. His service terminated on April 15, 1958, due to his elevation to the Ninth Circuit.

Hamlin was nominated by President Eisenhower on March 6, 1958, to a seat on the United States Court of Appeals for the Ninth Circuit vacated by Judge William Denman. He was confirmed by the Senate on March 25, 1958, and received commission the next day. He assumed senior status on September 5, 1963. His service terminated on December 28, 1973, due to his death.

== Sources ==
Legal offices
| Preceded by Monroe Mark Friedman | Judge of the United States District Court for the Northern District of California; 1953–1958 | Succeeded by Lloyd Hudson Burke |
| Preceded by William Denman | Judge of the United States Court of Appeals for the Ninth Circuit; 1958–1963 | Succeeded by Walter Raleigh Ely Jr. |
