= Noël Wise =

American federal judge (born 1968)

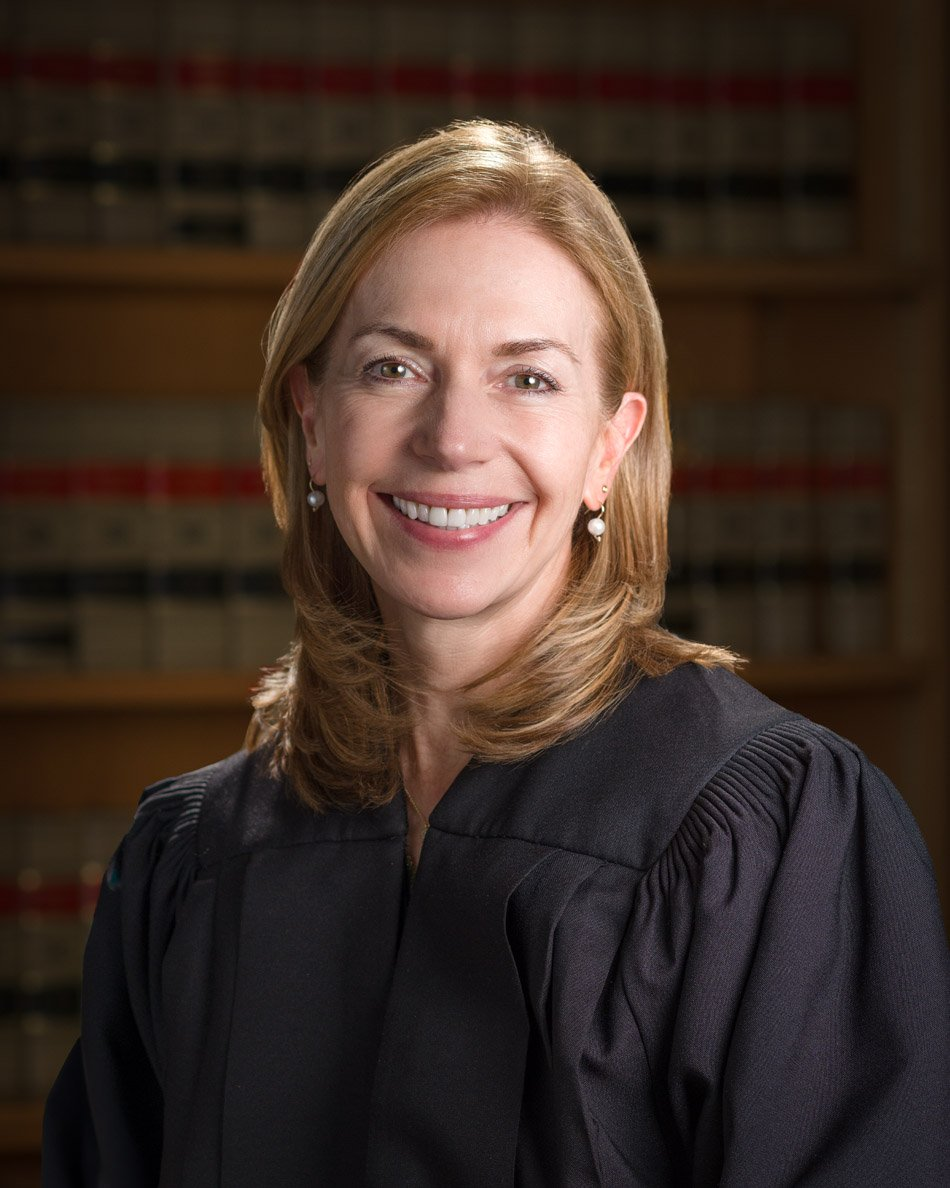
- Official portrait, 2025

Judge of the United States District Court for the Northern District of California
- Incumbent
- Assumed office December 19, 2024
- Appointed by: Joe Biden
- Preceded by: Edward Davila

Judge of the Alameda County Superior Court
- In office December 30, 2014 – December 19, 2024
- Appointed by: Jerry Brown
- Preceded by: Carrie McIntyre Panetta
- Succeeded by: Julie Wilensky

Personal details
- Born: Noël Streissguth; 1968 (age 57–58) Cherry Hill, New Jersey, U.S.
- Party: Democratic
- Education: University of Nevada, Las Vegas (BA); Nova Southeastern University (JD); Stanford University (JSM)

Noël Wise (née Streissguth; born 1968) is an American lawyer and jurist who has served as a U.S. district judge of the United States District Court for the Northern District of California since 2024. She previously served as a California state court judge on the Alameda County Superior Court from 2014 to 2024.

== Early life and education ==
Wise was born in 1968 in Cherry Hill, New Jersey. She graduated from the University of Nevada, Las Vegas in 1989 with a Bachelor of Science and from Nova Southeastern University Law School in 1993 with a Juris Doctor, magna cum laude. Later in her career, she earned a Juris Scientiae Magister from Stanford Law School in 2002.

== Career ==
Wise served as a law clerk for Justice Harry Lee Anstead on the Florida Fourth District Court of Appeals from 1993 to 1994. She served as a trial attorney in the United States Department of Justice Environment and Natural Resources Division in Washington, D.C. from 1994 to 2002, where she entered through the Honors Program. From 1997 to 1998, she was detailed to serve as an assistant United States attorney in the U.S Attorney’s Office for the Southern District of California. From 2002 to 2004, Wise was of counsel at Stoel Rives in San Francisco. From 2004 to 2006, she worked as in-house counsel for Pacific Gas and Electric Company in San Francisco. From 2006 to 2014, she was a partner at Wise Gleicher in Alameda, California. On November 12, 2014, Governor Jerry Brown appointed Wise to serve as a judge of the Alameda County Superior Court to fill the vacancy left by the appointment of Judge Carrie McIntyre Panetta to a different court. Wise was a supervising judge from 2019 to 2024. From 2021 to 2022, she served as a judge pro tem for the California Second District Court of Appeal.

=== Federal judicial service ===
On June 12, 2024, President Joe Biden announced his intent to nominate Wise to serve as a United States district judge of the United States District Court for the Northern District of California. On June 13, 2024, her nomination was sent to the Senate. President Biden nominated Wise to the seat being vacated by Judge Edward Davila, who announced his intent to assume senior status upon confirmation of a successor. On July 10, 2024, a hearing on her nomination was held before the Senate Judiciary Committee. During her confirmation hearing, she was questioned by Republican senators over several magazine articles she had written while serving as a judge. In a 2017 article for Time magazine, Wise questioned how laws that permit or prohibit conduct based on whether someone is a man or a woman should be applied to the approximately five U.S. children born each day with chromosomal or other medical irregularities such that doctors are unable to designate the sex at birth. In a 2020 article for The Atlantic, Wise argued that the judicial branch should "resemble the full range of people in America's communities." She stated "a diverse judicial branch is not a superficial optic" but instead that "Americans are more prone to have confidence and trust in the judicial branch of government if it includes judges who share their physical traits, experiences, or other aspects of their identity." On August 1, 2024, her nomination was reported out of committee by an 11–9 vote. On November 21, 2024, the United States Senate invoked cloture on her nomination by a 50–49 vote. On December 11, 2024, her nomination was confirmed by a 50–47 vote, with Senator Joe Manchin voting against confirmation. She received her judicial commission on December 19, 2024.

Legal offices
Preceded by Edward Davila	Judge of the United States District Court for the Northern District of California; 2024–present	Incumbent
