= Andrew Downey Orrick =

American governmental official

Chair of the U.S. Securities and Exchange Commission
- In office May 26, 1955 - July 15, 1960
- President: Dwight D. Eisenhower
- Preceded by: A.J. Goodwin, Jr.
- Succeeded by: Harold C. Patterson

Personal details
- Born: October 18, 1917 San Francisco, California
- Died: January 27, 2008 (aged 90) San Francisco, California

Andrew Downey Orrick (October 18, 1917 – January 27, 2008) was an American financier who was a partner with Orrick, Herrington & Sutcliffe and the acting chairman of the U.S. Securities and Exchange Commission in San Francisco in the 1950s.

== Early life and education ==
He was born on October 18, 1917, in San Francisco, California, to William Horsley Orrick Sr. He had a brother, William Horsley Orrick Jr. Downey graduated from Yale University in 1940, where he was a member of Skull and Bones. At Yale, while playing for the Yale baseball team, he hit the longest home run. He served during World War II, then attended UC Hastings College of the Law in San Francisco.

== Career ==
He then joined Orrick, Herrington & Sutcliffe in 1947.

He was San Francisco chairman of Citizens for Eisenhower in 1952. In 1962 he was the Northern California chairman of Richard Nixon's campaign for Governor of California. He became the San Francisco administrator of the U.S. Securities and Exchange Commission in December 1954. He was renominated to the position in 1957 and served until 1960.

== Death ==
He died on January 27, 2008, in San Francisco, California.
