= Herbert Wilson Erskine =

American judge

Judge of the United States District Court for the Northern District of California
- In office March 1, 1949 – March 18, 1951
- Appointed by: Harry S. Truman
- Preceded by: Adolphus Frederic St. Sure
- Succeeded by: Monroe Mark Friedman

Personal details
- Born: Herbert Wilson Erskine; August 27, 1888 San Francisco, California
- Died: March 18, 1951 (aged 62)
- Education: University of California, Berkeley (A.B.)

Herbert Wilson Erskine (August 27, 1888 – March 18, 1951) was a United States district judge of the United States District Court for the Northern District of California.

== Education and career ==
Born in San Francisco, California, Erskine received an Artium Baccalaureus degree from the University of California, Berkeley in 1908 and was in private practice in San Francisco from 1909 to 1949. He was special counsel for the California Toll Bridge Authority from 1939 to 1940. He was a California commissioner to the Golden Gate International Exposition from 1939 to 1940.

== Federal judicial service ==
On January 13, 1949, Erskine was nominated by President Harry S. Truman to a seat on the United States District Court for the Northern District of California vacated by Judge Adolphus Frederic St. Sure. Erskine was confirmed by the United States Senate on February 25, 1949, and received his commission on March 1, 1949. Erskine served in that capacity until his death, just over two years later on March 18, 1951.

== Sources ==
Legal offices
Preceded by Adolphus Frederic St. Sure	Judge of the United States District Court for the Northern District of California; 1949–1951	Succeeded by Monroe Mark Friedman
