= Albert Charles Wollenberg =

American judge

Senior Judge of the United States District Court for the Northern District of California
- In office April 30, 1975 – April 19, 1981

Judge of the United States District Court for the Northern District of California
- In office May 19, 1958 – April 30, 1975
- Appointed by: Dwight D. Eisenhower
- Preceded by: Michael Joseph Roche
- Succeeded by: William Schwarzer

Member of the California State Assembly from the 21st district
- In office January 4, 1943 - September 19, 1947
- Preceded by: John D. Welch
- Succeeded by: Arthur H. Connolly Jr.

Member of the California State Assembly from the 27th district
- In office January 2, 1939 - January 4, 1943
- Preceded by: Jefferson E. Peyser
- Succeeded by: Harrison W. Call

Personal details
- Born: Albert Charles Wollenberg; June 13, 1900 San Francisco, California
- Died: April 19, 1981 (aged 80) San Francisco, California
- Party: Republican
- Education: University of California, Berkeley (A.B.); UC Berkeley School of Law (J.D.)

Military service
- Branch/service: United States Army
- Battles/wars: World War I

Albert Charles Wollenberg (June 13, 1900 – April 19, 1981) was a United States district judge of the United States District Court for the Northern District of California.

== Education and career ==
Born in San Francisco, California, Wollenberg received an Artium Baccalaureus degree from the University of California, Berkeley in 1922 and a Juris Doctor from the UC Berkeley School of Law in 1924. He was in private practice in San Francisco from 1924 to 1927, and was an Assistant United States Attorney of the Northern District of California from 1927 to 1934, returning to private practice in San Francisco until 1947. He was a member of the California State Assembly for the 27th and 21st district from 1939 to 1947, when he became a Judge of the Superior Court of California for the City and County of San Francisco.

== Federal judicial service ==
On April 24, 1958, Wollenberg was nominated by President Dwight D. Eisenhower to a seat on the United States District Court for the Northern District of California vacated by Judge Michael Joseph Roche. Wollenberg was confirmed by the United States Senate on May 15, 1958, and received his commission on May 19, 1958. He was a member of the Judicial Conference of the United States from 1966 to 1969. He assumed senior status on April 30, 1975. Wollenberg served in that capacity until his death on April 19, 1981, in San Francisco.

== See also ==
- List of Jewish American jurists

== Sources ==
Legal offices
Preceded by Michael Joseph Roche	Judge of the United States District Court for the Northern District of California; 1958–1975	Succeeded by William Schwarzer
