= A.J. Goodwin, Jr. =

American banker (1911 – 1987)

Commissioner of the United States Securities and Exchange Commission
- In office 1953–1955
- Nominated by: Dwight D. Eisenhower
- Preceded by: J. Howard Rossbach
- Succeeded by: Andrew Downey Orrick

Personal details
- Born: October 18, 1911 Anniston, Alabama, U.S.
- Died: 1987 (aged 75–76)
- Party: Democratic
- Education: Princeton University (BA); Harvard Business School (MBA)
- Occupation: Banker

A. Jackson Goodwin, Jr. (1911 - 1987) was an American banker. He served as Securities and Exchange Commissioner between 1953 and 1955. Prior to the SEC, he was the director of the Birmingham branch of the Federal Reserve Bank of Atlanta.
