= Shirley Hufstedler =

American politician and judge (1925–2016)

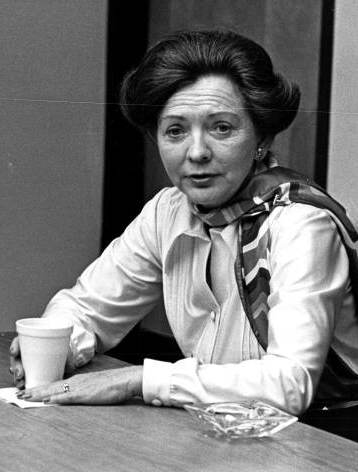
- Hufstedler in 1980

1st United States Secretary of Education
- In office November 30, 1979 – January 20, 1981
- President: Jimmy Carter
- Preceded by: Patricia Harris (Health, Education, and Welfare)
- Succeeded by: Terrel Bell

Judge of the United States Court of Appeals for the Ninth Circuit
- In office September 12, 1968 – November 30, 1979
- Appointed by: Lyndon B. Johnson
- Preceded by: Seat established
- Succeeded by: Robert Boochever

Associate Justice of the California Court of Appeals
- In office 1966 – September 12, 1968
- Appointed by: Pat Brown

Judge of the Los Angeles County Superior Court
- In office 1961–1966
- Appointed by: Pat Brown

Personal details
- Born: Shirley Ann Mount; August 24, 1925 Denver, Colorado, U.S.
- Died: March 30, 2016 (aged 90) Glendale, California, U.S.
- Party: Democratic
- Spouse: Seth Hufstedler (m. 1949)
- Education: University of New Mexico (BBA); Stanford University (LLB)

Shirley Ann Mount Hufstedler (August 24, 1925 – March 30, 2016) was an American attorney and judge who served as the first United States secretary of education from 1979 to 1981. She previously served as a U.S. circuit judge of the U.S. Ninth Circuit Court of Appeals from 1968 to 1979.

At the time of her presidential cabinet appointment under President Jimmy Carter, she was the highest ranking-woman in the U.S. federal judiciary.

== Early life and education ==
Hufstedler was born Shirley Ann Mount on August 24, 1925, in Denver, Colorado. Her mother's side of the family emigrated to the United States from Germany and were pioneers in Missouri. Hufstedler's father worked in construction and during the Great Depression the family had to move frequently so he could find work. As a result, she frequently changed schools and towns starting in the second grade. As a child, she lived in New Mexico, Montana, California, and Wyoming. A friend of her father's and famous war correspondent, Ernie Pyle, became a close friend and mentor of Hufstedler. Hufstedler received a Bachelor of Business Administration degree in 1945 from the University of New Mexico and a Bachelor of Laws in 1949 from Stanford Law School.

== Career ==
Initial attempts to begin her career after graduating proved to be difficult. Her graduating class from law school included only two women, as three of them dropped out, and although she graduated at the top of her class, she was still a woman in a male-dominated profession and she struggled to find employment opportunities. She started writing briefs for other lawyers and picked up other similar tasks. Ultimately, she opened up her own office in Los Angeles in 1951. From there, she managed to make her way to the Attorney General's Office. She served as Special Legal Consultant to the Attorney General of California in the complex Colorado River litigation before the U.S. Supreme Court from 1960 to 1961.

=== California Superior Court Judge ===
In 1961, she was appointed Judge of the Los Angeles County Superior Court, by Governor Pat Brown. a position to which she was elected in 1962 as a Democrat. At the time she was appointed to the Los Angeles County Superior Court, she was the only female in a group of 119 men. Judge Shirley M. Hufstedler is widely credited with introducing tentative rulings to American courts while sitting in Los Angeles Superior Court.

In 1966, she was appointed Associate Justice of the California Court of Appeals.

=== Federal judicial service ===
Hufstedler was nominated by President Lyndon B. Johnson on July 17, 1968, to the U.S. Ninth Circuit Court of Appeals, to a new seat authorized by 82 Stat. 184. She was confirmed by the U.S. Senate on September 12, 1968, and received her commission on September 12, 1968. Her service terminated on December 5, 1979, due to her resignation.

==== Selected judicial opinions ====
In 1973, a panel of the Ninth Circuit Court of Appeals decided in Lau v. Nichols that the San Francisco Unified School District had not violated the Fourteenth Amendment when it provided inadequate supplemental language support for non-English speakers. Hufstedler was not a member of this panel, but she called for the case to be reheard by the entire Ninth Circuit Court, en banc. Hufstedler wrote, "access to education offered by the public schools is completely foreclosed to these children who cannot comprehend any of it" and that the decision paralleled similar arguments that were determined to be unconstitutional in Brown v. Board of Education. Subsequently, the U. S. Supreme Court agreed with Hufstedler and overturned the Ninth Circuit's decision.

Hufstedler authored the majority opinion in Dietemann v. Time, Inc. (1971) Reporters employed by Life magazine would deceive their way into private homes and then record information and interactions between individuals in the home. Hufstedler affirmed the lower court's decision that such actions were an invasion of privacy. This helped provide clarity on freedom of the press and specifically, the limitations that the First Amendment has on protecting the freedom of the press.

Hufstedler was in the majority for Warren Jones Co. v. Commissioner (1975). In this case, the majority decided that real estate had a certain fair market value which was determinable. Thus, taxpayers were required to include that fair market value in tax return calculations.

=== Secretary of Education ===
Hufstedler joined the Carter administration when appointed to be the first U.S. Secretary of Education in 1979. As the first Secretary of Education, Hufstedler's agenda has been depicted as being focused on strengthening state and federal interrelationships, as well as educational equity. Her dedication toward educational needs helped set precedent in the importance of its existence, even later preventing President Ronald Reagan's attempts to dismantle it all together after he beat President Carter in 1980.

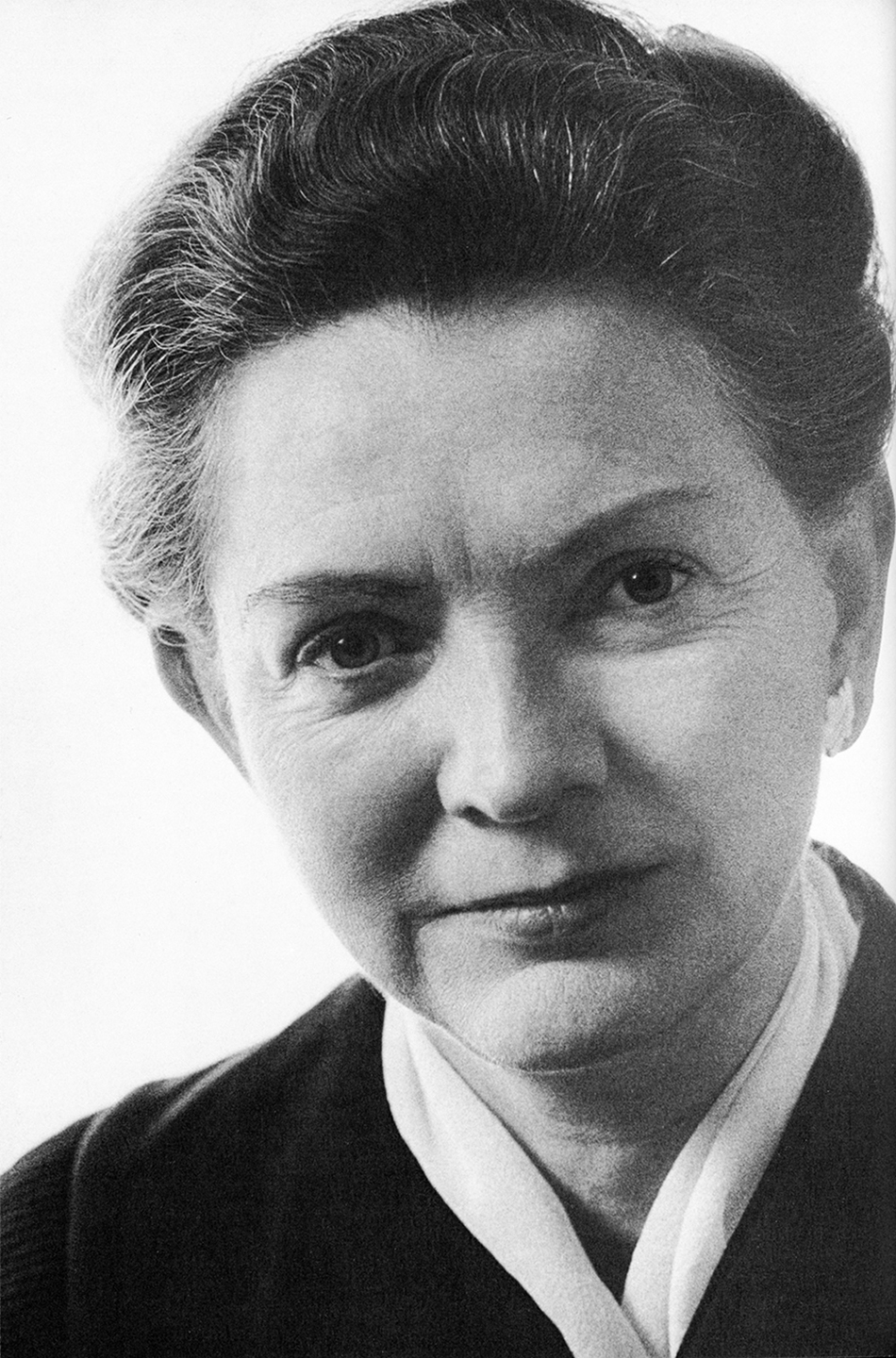
Shirley Hufstedler photographed by Lynn Gilbert

=== Later career ===
Hufstedler was considered to be a candidate for the Supreme Court if a vacancy had occurred under the Jimmy Carter presidency. In 1981, Hufstedler returned to private life, teaching and practicing law. She was a partner in the firm Hufstedler & Kaus, now merged into Morrison & Foerster. She taught across the country, including stints at the University of California at Irvine and Santa Cruz, the University of Iowa, the University of Vermont, Stanford Law School, and the University of Oregon.

In 1984, Hufstedler served as the Wayne Morse Chair of Law and Politics, established in honor of the late former Senator, at the University of Oregon.

== Personal life ==
Hufstedler met her husband, Seth Hufstedler, at law school and they married in 1949. They had one child, Dr. Steve Hufstedler, and four grandchildren.

Hufstedler appears in the 2009 film biography of pioneering aviator and hostess Pancho Barnes, The Legend of Pancho Barnes and the Happy Bottom Riding Club, billed as "Pancho's legal advisor."

On March 30, 2016, Hufstedler died in Glendale, California, from cerebrovascular disease at the age of 90. She is interred in the Forest Lawn Memorial Park (Glendale).

== Awards and honors ==
Hufstedler served on boards of trustees, governing boards and visiting committees for numerous foundations, institutions, corporations and universities as follows:

=== Honorary doctorate degrees ===
She was the recipient of almost 20 honorary doctoral degrees from American universities. They include:

- The Claremont University Center.
- Columbia University.
- Georgetown University.
- Gonzaga University.
- Hood College.
- Mount Holyoke College.
- University of Michigan.
- University of New Mexico.
- Occidental College.
- University of the Pacific.
- University of Pennsylvania.
- Rutgers University.
- University of Southern California.
- Smith College.
- Syracuse University.
- Tufts University.
- Tulane University.
- University of Wyoming.
- Yale University.

=== Awards ===
Her awards include:

- The Order of the Coif.
- The Marshall-Wythe Medal (College of William and Mary).
- St. Thomas More Medal (Loyola Law School).
- Golden Plate Award American Academy of Achievement.
- Woman of the Year Award (Los Angeles Times).
- Woman of the Year Award (Ladies Home Journal).
- University of California at Los Angeles Medal.
- Herbert O. Harley Award (American Judicature Society).
- Earl Warren Medal (University of Judaism).
- Louis D. Brandeis Medal (University of Louisville).
- Shattuck-Price Memorial Award (Los Angeles County Bar Association).
- Stanford Law School Award of Merit.
- American Bar Association's 1995 Gold Medal.
- Margaret Brent Award (ABA Commission on Women in the Legal Profession).
- The Learned Hand Award.
- She was the first woman to receive the American Bar Association medal.

=== Memberships and affiliations ===
- Hufstedler was the first woman on the Council of the American Law Institute.
- She was on the Board of Directors of Harman International Industries.
- She was the emeritus director of the John D. and Catherine T. MacArthur Foundation and the Salzburg Seminar.
- She was a trustee of the California Institute of Technology.
- She was an active member of the following: American Bar Association, American Law Institute, American Judicature Society, Association of the Bar of the City of New York, Pacific Council, International Association of Women Lawyers, Institute for Judicial Administration, Los Angeles Bar Association, National Association of Women Lawyers, State Bar of California, Town Hall, Federal Bar Association and Women Lawyers Association.
- At some point, Hufstedler had also previously served on the following: Board of Trustees of Carnegie Endowment for International Peace, the Colonial Williamsburg Foundation, the Institute for Advanced Study at Princeton, the Institute for Judicial Administration, Natural Resources Defense Council, Council of the American Law Institute, and the governing boards of the United States Military Academy, Institute for Civil Justice, Harvard Law School, Stanford Law School, the University of Pennsylvania Law School, the University of Southern California Law Center, the Institute for Court Management, the Constitutional Rights Foundation, the Advisory Council for Appellate Justice, American Judicature Society, Center for National Policy and Occidental College.
- She guest lectured in ten foreign countries: the UK, France, Bulgaria, Israel, Jordan, Iran, India, Nepal, Malaysia, and Sweden.
- She was a delegate to the Nuclear Arms Control with Erwin Griswald from the Lawyers Alliance. At such time, she was also involved in negotiations with the Soviet Union, which lasted for almost a decade.

=== Legacy ===
In 2021, the Board of Trustees of the California Institute of Technology voted to remove Robert Andrews Millikan's name from everything that was named in his honor on the Caltech campus due to Millikan's involvement with the Human Betterment Foundation and the eugenics movement. The Board decided that the former Robert A. Millikan Professorship should now be known as the Judge Shirley Hufstedler Professorship.

== See also ==
- List of female United States Cabinet members
- List of first women lawyers and judges in California

== Sources ==
- Connell, Christopher (May 4, 1980). "Education chief background rich". Tuscaloosa News. AP.

Legal offices
New seat	Judge of the United States Court of Appeals for the Ninth Circuit; 1968–1979	Succeeded by Robert Boochever
Political offices
Preceded by Patricia Harris as United States Secretary of Health, Education, and Welfare	United States Secretary of Education; 1979–1981	Succeeded by Terrel Bell
