= Charles A. Legge =

American judge (1930–2023)

Judge of the United States District Court for the Northern District of California
- In office September 18, 1984 – June 30, 2001
- Appointed by: Ronald Reagan
- Preceded by: Robert Howard Schnacke
- Succeeded by: Jeffrey White

Personal details
- Born: August 24, 1930 San Francisco, California, U.S.
- Died: December 8, 2023 (aged 93)
- Education: Stanford University (A.B.); Stanford Law School (J.D.)

Charles Alexander Legge (August 24, 1930 – December 8, 2023) was a United States district judge of the United States District Court for the Northern District of California.

== Education and career ==
Legge was born in San Francisco, California, and attended Piedmont High School. He received an Artium Baccalaureus degree from Stanford University in 1952 and a Juris Doctor from Stanford Law School in 1954. He passed the State Bar of California in 1954. He was in the United States Army from 1954 to 1956, and was then in private practice in San Francisco until 1984.

== Federal judicial service ==
On June 19, 1984, Legge was nominated by President Ronald Reagan to a seat on the United States District Court for the Northern District of California vacated by Judge Robert Howard Schnacke. Legge was confirmed by the United States Senate on September 17, 1984, and received his commission on September 18, 1984. Legge served in that capacity until his retirement, on June 30, 2001.

== Post judicial service ==
Following his retirement from the bench, Legge engaged in the private practice of law, concentrating in the areas of arbitration, mediation and intellectual property. Legge died on December 8, 2023, at the age of 93.

== Sources ==
Legal offices
| Preceded by Robert Howard Schnacke | Judge of the United States District Court for the Northern District of California; 1984–2001 | Succeeded by Jeffrey White |
