= Samuel Conti =

American judge

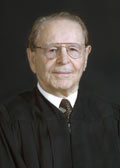

Senior Judge of the United States District Court for the Northern District of California
- In office November 1, 1987 – August 29, 2018

Judge of the United States District Court for the Northern District of California
- In office October 16, 1970 – November 1, 1987
- Appointed by: Richard Nixon
- Preceded by: Seat established by 84 Stat. 294
- Succeeded by: Fern M. Smith

Judge of the Contra Costa County Superior Court
- In office 1968–1970
- Appointed by: Ronald Reagan

Personal details
- Born: July 16, 1922 Los Angeles, California, U.S.
- Died: August 29, 2018 (aged 96) Carlsbad, California, U.S.
- Spouse: Dolores
- Children: 3
- Education: University of Santa Clara (BS); Stanford University (LLB)

Samuel Conti (July 16, 1922 – August 29, 2018) was an American jurist who was a United States district judge of the United States District Court for the Northern District of California. He was appointed to the federal bench in 1970, and assumed senior status in 1987. He continued to hear cases until 2015.

== Background ==
Born on July 16, 1922, in Los Angeles, California, Conti received a Bachelor of Science degree from the University of Santa Clara in 1945 after serving in the U.S. Army during World War II. He received a Bachelor of Laws from Stanford Law School in 1948.

== Career ==
He was in private practice in San Francisco, California from 1948 to 1967. He was Chairman of the Civil Service Board of Appeals in Pittsburg, California from 1956 to 1958. He was city attorney of Concord, California from 1960 to 1969. He was a judge of the Contra Costa County Superior Court from 1968 to 1970.

=== Federal judicial service ===
Conti was nominated by President Richard Nixon on October 7, 1970, to the United States District Court for the Northern District of California, to a new seat created by 84 Stat. 294. He was confirmed by the United States Senate on October 13, 1970, and received his commission on October 16, 1970. He assumed senior status on November 1, 1987. Conti assumed inactive status on October 30, 2015, meaning that while he remained a federal judge, he no longer heard cases or participated in the business of the court.

Conti was a self-described conservative known for his tough-on-crime views and ardent support of capital punishment, earning the nicknames "Hanging Sam" and "Slammin' Sam".

==== Notable cases ====
In 1974, Conti sentenced Nicholas Sand to fifteen years' imprisonment for operating a lab that manufactured LSD, and lamented that it was not a capital offense. In 1976, he handed down a life sentence to Sara Jane Moore, who attempted to assassinate President Gerald Ford in San Francisco.

Between 1979–1980, Conti presided over a racketeering trial involving of members of the Hells Angels. He and his family required protection by the United States Marshals due to threats he received.

Conti presided over a copyright infringement trial in 1988, in which John Fogerty was sued by his former label, Fantasy Records, over his 1984 song "The Old Man Down the Road", which they claimed infringed the copyright of his Creedence Clearwater Revival song "Run Through the Jungle". Part of Fogerty's defense involved performing both songs in court for the jury, who found in his favor.

In 2008, Conti ruled that military veterans suing over delayed mental health treatment from the United States Department of Veterans Affairs had no recourse in the courts for their complaint, because systemic error was not proven. He suggested that he was unhappy to have reached that conclusion, and was privately disappointed when his ruling was upheld on appeal.

== Personal life and death ==
Conti was married to his wife, Dolores, for 66 years. The couple had three children.

In retirement, Conti lived in Carlsbad, California, and died at home on August 29, 2018, at the age of 96.

== See also ==
- List of United States federal judges by longevity of service

== Sources ==
Legal offices
Preceded by Seat established by 84 Stat. 294	Judge of the United States District Court for the Northern District of California; 1970–1987	Succeeded by Fern M. Smith
