= Harold Louderback =

American judge

Judge of the United States District Court for the Northern District of California
- In office April 17, 1928 – December 11, 1941
- Appointed by: Calvin Coolidge
- Preceded by: John Slater Partridge
- Succeeded by: Louis Earl Goodman

Personal details
- Born: January 30, 1881; San Francisco, California, U.S.
- Died: December 11, 1941 (aged 60)
- Education: University of Nevada, Reno (BA); Harvard University (LLB)

Harold Louderback (January 30, 1881 – December 11, 1941) was a United States district judge of the United States District Court for the Northern District of California. He was the eleventh federal official to be served with articles of impeachment by the House of Representatives. He was acquitted in the Senate and returned to the bench.

== Education and career ==
Louderback was born in San Francisco, California and attended the University of Nevada, Reno, graduating in 1905 with an Artium Baccalaureus degree and then attended Harvard Law School, graduating in 1908 with a Bachelor of Laws. Louderback then went into private practice from 1908 until 1917. In 1917, Louderback joined the United States Army and held the rank of captain. In 1919, he left military service and returned to private practice until 1921 when he was appointed as a Superior Court Judge for the City and County of San Francisco, serving in this position until his appointment to the federal judiciary. As a State Judge, Louderback presided over the trial of Fatty Arbuckle.

== Federal judicial service ==
Louderback was nominated by President Calvin Coolidge on March 21, 1928, to a seat on the United States District Court for the Northern District of California vacated by Judge John Slater Partridge. He was confirmed by the United States Senate on April 17, 1928, and received his commission the same day. His service terminated on December 11, 1941, due to his death.

=== Impeachment and acquittal ===
On February 24, 1933, Louderback was served with five Articles of Impeachment by the United States House of Representatives, including 4 articles alleging corruption in bankruptcy cases (appointing incompetent receivers and allowing them excessive fees), and a general charge of bringing his Court into disrepute. The United States Senate tried the impeachment, and on May 24, 1933, acquitted him of all the charges by the following margins:

	Yeas	Nays
Article I	34	42
Article II	23	47
Article III	11	63
Article IV	30	47
Article V	45	34

Even though the fifth article gained a majority in the Senate, it was not sufficient to meet the Constitutionally required majority of two-thirds. Louderback remained on the bench until his death in 1941.

Legal offices
Preceded by John Slater Partridge	Judge of the United States District Court for the Northern District of California; 1928–1941	Succeeded by Louis Earl Goodman
