= Maxine M. Chesney =

American judge (born 1942)

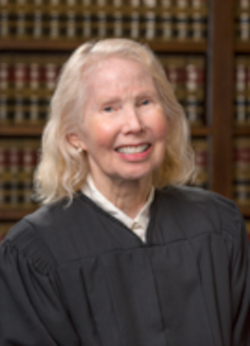

Senior Judge of the United States District Court for the Northern District of California
- Incumbent
- Assumed office June 30, 2009

Judge of the United States District Court for the Northern District of California
- In office May 10, 1995 – June 30, 2009
- Appointed by: Bill Clinton
- Preceded by: John P. Vukasin Jr.
- Succeeded by: Richard Seeborg

Personal details
- Born: Maxine Sharon Kurtz; October 29, 1942 (age 83) San Francisco, California, U.S.
- Education: University of California, Berkeley (BA, JD)

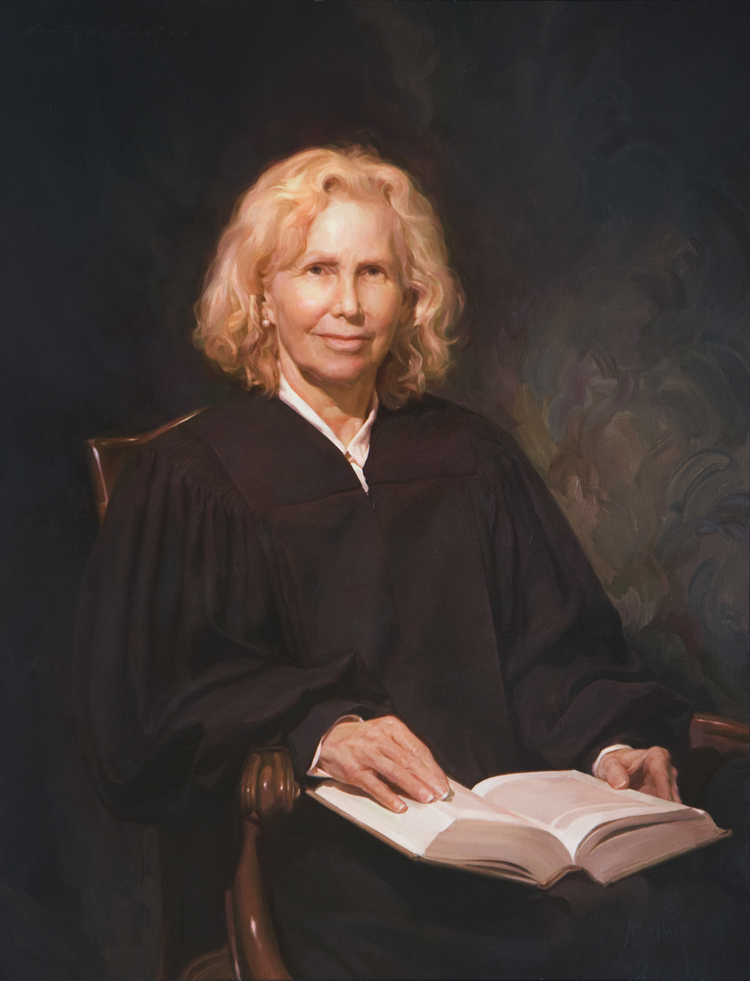
Judge Maxine Chesney's official portrait for the U.S. District Court was painted by Scott Wallace Johnston

Maxine Mackler Chesney (born October 29, 1942) is a senior United States district judge of the United States District Court for the Northern District of California.

== Early life and education ==
Chesney was born on October 29, 1942, in San Francisco, California. She received a Bachelor of Arts degree from the University of California, Berkeley in 1964 and a Juris Doctor from the University of California, Berkeley, Boalt Hall School of Law in 1967. She was an attorney, Office of the San Francisco District Attorney, California from 1968 to 1979. She was a trial attorney from 1968 to 1969. She was a senior trial attorney from 1969 to 1971. She was a Principal trial attorney from 1971 to 1976. She was a Head trial attorney in 1976. She was an Assistant chief deputy from 1976 to 1979.

== Judicial career ==
=== Municipal court judge ===
Chesney was a judge on the San Francisco Municipal Court, California from 1979 to 1983. She was a judge on the Superior Court of California, City and County of San Francisco, appointed and subsequently elected from 1983 to 1995.

=== Federal judicial service ===
In 1994, Chesney was nominated by President Bill Clinton to a seat on the United States District Court for the Northern District of California vacated by John P. Vukasin Jr., but the United States Senate took no action on the nomination. However, President Clinton successfully resubmitted the nomination on January 24, 1995, and Chesney was confirmed by the Senate on May 8, 1995, receiving her commission on May 10, 1995. She assumed senior status on June 30, 2009.

== Notes ==
Legal offices
Preceded by John P. Vukasin Jr.	Judge of the United States District Court for the Northern District of California; 1995–2009	Succeeded by Richard G. Seeborg
