= Louis Earl Goodman =

American judge (1892-1961)

Chief Judge of the United States District Court for the Northern District of California
- In office 1958–1961
- Preceded by: Michael Joseph Roche
- Succeeded by: George Bernard Harris

Judge of the United States District Court for the Northern District of California
- In office December 24, 1942 – September 15, 1961
- Appointed by: Franklin D. Roosevelt
- Preceded by: Harold Louderback
- Succeeded by: Stanley Alexander Weigel

Personal details
- Born: Louis Earl Goodman; January 2, 1892 Lemoore, California
- Died: September 15, 1961 (aged 69) Palo Alto, California
- Education: University of California, Berkeley (B.A.); University of California, Hastings; College of the Law (LL.B.)

Louis Earl Goodman (January 2, 1892 – September 15, 1961) was a United States district judge of the United States District Court for the Northern District of California.

== Education and career ==
Born in Lemoore, California, Goodman received a Bachelor of Arts degree from the University of California, Berkeley in 1913 and a Bachelor of Laws from the University of California, Hastings College of the Law in 1915. He was in private practice in San Francisco, California from 1915 to 1942, and was a member of a Selective Service Local Board from 1940 to 1942.

== Federal judicial service ==
On November 9, 1942, Goodman was nominated by President Franklin D. Roosevelt to a seat on the United States District Court for the Northern District of California vacated by Judge Harold Louderback. Goodman was confirmed by the United States Senate on December 15, 1942, and received his commission on December 24, 1942. He served as Chief Judge from 1958 until his death on September 15, 1961, in Palo Alto, California.

== See also ==
- List of Jewish American jurists

== Sources ==
Legal offices
Preceded by Harold Louderback	Judge of the United States District Court for the Northern District of California; 1942–1961	Succeeded by Stanley Alexander Weigel
Preceded by Michael Joseph Roche	Chief Judge of the United States District Court for the Northern District of California; 1958–1961	Succeeded by George Bernard Harris
