= Walter Raleigh Ely Jr. =

American judge (1913–1984)

Senior Judge of the United States Court of Appeals for the Ninth Circuit
- In office October 31, 1979 – October 9, 1984

Judge of the United States Court of Appeals for the Ninth Circuit
- In office July 2, 1964 – October 31, 1979
- Appointed by: Lyndon B. Johnson
- Preceded by: Oliver Deveta Hamlin Jr.
- Succeeded by: William Albert Norris

Personal details
- Born: Walter Raleigh Ely Jr. June 24, 1913 Baird, Callahan County, Texas
- Died: October 9, 1984 (aged 71) Houston, Texas
- Education: University of Texas at Austin (AB); University of Texas School of Law (LLB); USC Gould School of Law (LLM)

Walter Raleigh Ely Jr. (June 24, 1913 – October 9, 1984) was a United States circuit judge of the United States Court of Appeals for the Ninth Circuit.

== Education and career ==
Born in Baird, Callahan County, Texas, Ely received an Artium Baccalaureus degree from the University of Texas at Austin in 1935 and a Bachelor of Laws from the University of Texas School of Law in 1935. He was in private practice in Abilene, Texas from 1935 to 1938, and was an assistant state attorney general of Texas from 1939 to 1941. He served in the United States Marine Corps during World War II, from 1941 to 1944. He returned to private practice, this time in Los Angeles, California from 1945 to 1964, receiving a Master of Laws from the USC Gould School of Law in 1949 and serving as president of the Los Angeles County Bar Association in 1962.

== Federal judicial service ==
On June 5, 1964, Ely was nominated by President Lyndon B. Johnson to a seat on the United States Court of Appeals for the Ninth Circuit vacated by Judge Oliver Deveta Hamlin Jr. Ely was confirmed by the United States Senate on July 1, 1964, and received his commission the following day. He assumed senior status on October 31, 1979, serving in that capacity until his death on October 9, 1984. He was in the majority for Warren Jones Co. v. Commissioner and gave a dissenting opinion on United States v. Jewell.

== Sources ==
Legal offices
Preceded by Oliver Deveta Hamlin Jr.	Judge of the United States Court of Appeals for the Ninth Circuit; 1964–1979	Succeeded by William Albert Norris
