= Michael Joseph Roche =

American judge (1878-1964)

Senior Judge of the United States District Court for the Northern District of California
- In office March 1, 1958 – July 1, 1964

Chief Judge of the United States District Court for the Northern District of California
- In office 1948–1958
- Preceded by: Office established
- Succeeded by: Louis Earl Goodman

Judge of the United States District Court for the Northern District of California
- In office August 24, 1935 – March 1, 1958
- Appointed by: Franklin D. Roosevelt
- Preceded by: Frank Henry Kerrigan
- Succeeded by: Albert Charles Wollenberg

Personal details
- Born: Michael Joseph Roche; July 22, 1878 An Rinn, Ireland
- Died: July 1, 1964 (aged 85)
- Education: Valparaiso University School of Law (LL.B.)

Michael Joseph Roche (July 22, 1878 – July 1, 1964) was a United States district judge of the United States District Court for the Northern District of California.

== Education and career ==
Born in An Rinn, County Waterford, Ireland, the son of William and Bridget Foley Roche, Roche received a Bachelor of Laws from Valparaiso University School of Law in 1908. He entered private practice in San Francisco, California in 1908, and was an assistant district attorney of San Francisco from 1908 to 1910. He was a judge of the Municipal Court of San Francisco from 1910 to 1914, and of the Superior Court of California in San Francisco from 1918 to 1935.

== Federal judicial service ==
On August 21, 1935, Roche was nominated by President Franklin D. Roosevelt to a seat on the United States District Court for the Northern District of California vacated by Judge Frank Henry Kerrigan. Roche was confirmed by the United States Senate on August 23, 1935, and received his commission on August 24, 1935. He served as Chief Judge from 1948 to 1958, assuming senior status on March 1, 1958 and serving in that capacity until his death on July 1, 1964.

=== Notable cases ===
Roche presided over the trial of Tokyo Rose. He also denied a writ of habeas corpus from lawyer James Purcell on behalf of Mitsuye Endo and 120,000 persons of Japanese descent challenging their wartime detention as unlawful. The Supreme Court heard the case, Ex parte Endo and freed Endo.

== Sources ==
Legal offices
Preceded by Frank Henry Kerrigan	Judge of the United States District Court for the Northern District of California; 1935–1958	Succeeded by Albert Charles Wollenberg
Preceded by Office established	Chief Judge of the United States District Court for the Northern District of California; 1948–1958	Succeeded by Louis Earl Goodman
