= Barbara A. Caulfield =

American judge (1947–2010)

Judge of the United States District Court for the Northern District of California
- In office November 5, 1991 – September 16, 1994
- Appointed by: George H. W. Bush
- Preceded by: William Schwarzer
- Succeeded by: Susan Illston

Personal details
- Born: Barbara Ann Caulfield; December 2, 1947 Oak Park, Illinois
- Died: November 9, 2010 (aged 62)
- Education: Northwestern University (BS); Northwestern University School of Law (JD)

Barbara Ann Caulfield (December 2, 1947 – November 9, 2010) was a United States district judge of the United States District Court for the Northern District of California.

== Education and career ==
Born in Oak Park, Illinois, Caulfield received a Bachelor of Science degree from Northwestern University in 1969 and a Juris Doctor from Northwestern University School of Law in 1972. She was a researcher and attorney of the Chicago Law Enforcement Study Group, Northwestern University Center for Urban Affairs from 1972 to 1973, and a supervising attorney of Northwestern University School Law Legal Aid Clinic from 1973 to 1974. She was a professor of law at the University of Oregon Law School from 1974 to 1978. She was a professor of law, University of California, San Francisco, Hastings College of the Law from 1978 to 1983, serving as an academic dean from 1980 to 1981. She was in private practice in San Francisco, California from 1983 to 1991, serving as senior counsel to Pacific Bell from 1990 to 1991. She also began as a lecturer in law in the Stanford Law School in 1988.

== Federal judicial service ==
On June 27, 1991, Caulfield was nominated by President George H. W. Bush to a seat on the United States District Court for the Northern District of California vacated by Judge William Schwarzer. She was confirmed by the United States Senate on October 31, 1991, and received her commission on November 5, 1991. Caulfield served in that capacity until her resignation from the bench on September 16, 1994.

== Later life ==
Caulfield thereafter returned to private practice in San Francisco, and continued to lecture at Stanford until her death on November 9, 2010.

== Sources ==
Legal offices
Preceded by William Schwarzer	Judge of the United States District Court for the Northern District of California; 1991–1994	Succeeded by Susan Illston
