= Warren Jones Co. v. Commissioner =

- Court: United States Court of Appeals for the Ninth Circuit
- Full case name: Warren Jones Company v. Commissioner of Internal Revenue
- Decided: September 22, 1975
- Citations: 524 F.2d 788; 1975 U.S. App. LEXIS 12684; 75-2 U.S. Tax Cas. (CCH) ¶ 9732; 36 A.F.T.R.2d (RIA) 5954

Case history
- Prior history: 60 T.C. 663 (1973)
- Subsequent history: On remand, 68 T.C. 837 (1977)

Court membership
- Judges sitting: Walter Raleigh Ely, Jr., Shirley Hufstedler, Fred Monroe Taylor (D. Idaho)

Case opinions
- Majority: Ely, joined by Hufstedler, Taylor

Laws applied
- Internal Revenue Code

Warren Jones Company v. Commissioner of Internal Revenue, 524 F.2d 788 (9th Cir. 1975) was a taxation decision by the United States Court of Appeals for the Ninth Circuit.

It reversed a US Tax Court decision that held that "the fair market value of a real estate contract did not constitute an amount realized by the taxpayer in the taxable year of sale under Internal Revenue Code § 1001(b)."

The Court of Appeals held "that the real estate had a certain fair market value that was ascertainable and that the taxpayer had to include that fair market value to determine the amount realized under § 1001(b)."

== Background ==
Taxpayer, the Warren Jones Company, entered into a real estate contract to sell an apartment building for $153,000 on May 27, 1968 to Bernard and Jo An Storey. On June 15, 1968, the sale closed and the Storeys paid taxpayer $20,000 in cash and took possession of the apartment building. The contract then required the Storeys to pay the taxpayer $1,000 per month, plus 8 percent interest on the declining balance, for the next fifteen years. The balance due at the end of period was to be payable in a lump sum. Deed would then pass to the Storeys from taxpayer.

Taxpayer had an adjusted basis of $61,913 in the apartment building on the closing date. Taxpayer had added only the $20,000 down payment and the portion of $4,000 in monthly payments it had received that was allocable to principal. Accordingly, in its federal income tax return for the taxable year ending October 31, 1968, taxpayer reported no gain from the sale of the apartment building. Taxpayer argued that it had reported on its cash basis and that under a prior Tax Court holding (Nina J. Ennis, 17 T.C. 465 (1951)), taxpayer did not have to report gain on the sale until it had recovered its basis. Taxpayer also argued that, if it was required to report gain in the taxable year of sale, Taxpayer would elect do so on the installment basis of I.R.C. § 453.

The Commissioner of the Internal Revenue Service disagreed with the taxpayer's claim that it had not realized any gain on the sale, but conceded that the sale qualified as an installment sale. Accordingly, the taxpayer's gain was recalculated in accordance with § 453 and taxpayer was notified that it had recognized an additional $12,098 in long term capital gain. The taxpayer then asked the Tax Court to re-determine taxpayer's liability. This required determining whether I.R.C. § 1001(b) requires the taxpayer to include the fair market value of its real estate contract with the Storeys for determining the "amount realized" during the taxable year of the sale.Warren Jones Co. v. Commissioner, 524 F.2d 788, 790 (9th Cir. 1975).

The Tax Court, relying on the "cash equivalency" doctrine, held that the fair market value of the contract was not includable in the amount realized from the sale. Commissioner did not dispute the fair market value of the contract, but argued that since the Tax Court had determined the contract had a fair market value, § 1001(b) required the taxpayer to include the amount of that fair market value in determining the amount value.

== Decision ==
The 9th Circuit reversed the Tax Court's ruling and held that the real estate had a certain fair market value that was determinable. Thus, taxpayer was required to include that fair market value to determine the amount realized under § 1001(b) for its tax return. The 9th Circuit concluded that the U.S. Congress in a predecessor statute to § 1001(b) had intended to establish that "if the fair market value of property received in an exchange can be ascertained, that fair market value must be reported as an amount realized." The 9th Circuit also concluded that I.R.C. § 453 supported interpreting § 1001(b) as the Commissioner contended.

== Significance ==
The ruling's significance affects taxpayers using the cash method of accounting in regards to determining the amount realized in a deferred payment sale if they have opted not to use the installment method of accounting.

The US Supreme Court, in Burnet v. Logan, 283 U.S. 404 (1931) held that taxpayers using the installment method can defer the recognition of gain according to the open transaction doctrine if an obligation's fair market value cannot be determined.

Can a taxpayer who elects out of the installment method of I.R.C. § 453 still defer the recognition (inclusion in gross income) of gain by using Burnet v. Logan''s open transaction doctrine? Legislative history seems to imply that Congress would say no.

What if a taxpayer elects out of the installment method of accounting despite having the ability to reasonably determine the amount realized from a deferred payment sale? Can the taxpayer defer the recognition of gain in this instance? The answer is presumably no since "the entire amount realized must be taken into account in the year of sale." For taxpayers opting to use the cash method of accounting, the case decides how the amount realized is taken into account. It holds that for taxpayers using the cash method accounting, the entire amount realized "would be the fair market value of the installment obligation."
