= William Schwarzer =

American judge

Senior Judge of the United States District Court for the Northern District of California
- In office April 30, 1991 – January 28, 2017

Judge of the United States District Court for the Northern District of California
- In office July 23, 1976 – April 30, 1991
- Appointed by: Gerald Ford
- Preceded by: Albert Charles Wollenberg
- Succeeded by: Barbara A. Caulfield

Personal details
- Born: William W. Schwarzer; April 30, 1925 Berlin, Germany
- Died: January 28, 2017 (aged 91) San Rafael, California, U.S.
- Education: University of Southern California (BA); Harvard University (JD)

William W. Schwarzer (April 30, 1925 – January 28, 2017) was a United States district judge of the United States District Court for the Northern District of California.

== Education and career ==
Born in Berlin, Germany, Schwarzer emigrated with his family to the United States. Schwarzer served in the United States Army during World War II, beginning in 1943. He attained the rank of Second Lieutenant, and was discharged in 1947. He received an Artium Baccalaureus degree, (cum laude), at the University of Southern California in 1948, and a Bachelor of Laws with honors from Harvard Law School in 1951, where he was a member of the Harvard Legal Aid Bureau, and where he also served as a teaching fellow from 1951 to 1952. He entered private practice in San Francisco, California in 1952 as an associate at McCutchen, Doyle, Brown & Enersen (which later became Bingham McCutchen). He became a partner at the firm in 1960 and continued with McCutchen until his appointment to the federal bench in 1976. He served as senior counsel to the President's Commission on CIA Activities within the United States (better known as the Rockefeller Commission) in 1975.

== Federal judicial service ==
On June 2, 1976 Schwarzer was nominated by President Gerald Ford to a seat on the United States District Court for the Northern District of California vacated by Judge Albert Charles Wollenberg. Schwarzer was confirmed by the United States Senate on July 23, 1976, and received his commission the same day. He assumed senior status on April 30, 1991. He served as the director of the Federal Judicial Center from 1990 to 1995. His service terminated on January 28, 2017, due to his death in San Rafael, California.

== Notable cases ==
Schwarzer presided over a lawsuit filed by Apple Computer against Microsoft, in which Apple alleged that Microsoft used some Apple features in Windows Version 2.03, and later 3.0. On January 5, 1989 Schwarzer dropped all but 10 of the 189 claims that Apple brought against Microsoft.

In 1988 Schwarzer dropped the last charges of child molestation against Gary Hambright, an ordained Southern Baptist minister, who worked in the Presidio Army Base day-care center that, at one point, had over 10 charges of child sexual assault.

== Other activities ==
In 1986 Schwarzer worked with Rod McManigal to tighten up Schwarzer's libretto to Galileo, a Grove Play performed at the Bohemian Grove. Schwarzer joined the Bohemian Club in 1979.

Legal offices
Preceded by Albert Charles Wollenberg	Judge of the United States District Court for the Northern District of California; 1976–1991	Succeeded by Barbara A. Caulfield
