= William Thomas Sweigert =

American judge (1900-1983)

Senior Judge of the United States District Court for the Northern District of California
- In office November 30, 1973 – February 16, 1983

Judge of the United States District Court for the Northern District of California
- In office September 21, 1959 – November 30, 1973
- Appointed by: Dwight D. Eisenhower
- Preceded by: Edward Preston Murphy
- Succeeded by: William H. Orrick Jr.

Personal details
- Born: William Thomas Sweigert; October 13, 1900 San Jose, California
- Died: February 16, 1983 (aged 82)
- Education: University of San Francisco (A.B.); University of San Francisco School of Law (LL.B.)

William Thomas Sweigert (October 13, 1900 – February 16, 1983) was a United States district judge of the United States District Court for the Northern District of California.

== Education and career ==
Born in San Jose, California, Sweigert received an Artium Baccalaureus degree from St. Ignatius College (now the University of San Francisco) in 1921 and a Bachelor of Laws from the St. Ignatius College School of Law (now the University of San Francisco School of Law) in 1923. He was in private practice in San Francisco, California, from 1923 to 1940, and was a lecturer at the University of San Francisco School of Law from 1925 to 1932. He was an assistant state attorney general (later chief assistant attorney general) of California from 1940 to 1942, and was then executive secretary to Governor Earl Warren 1943. He was a Judge of the Municipal Court of San Francisco in 1949, and of the San Francisco County Superior Court from 1949 to 1959.

== Federal judicial service ==
On April 23, 1959, Sweigert was nominated by President Dwight D. Eisenhower to a seat on the United States District Court for the Northern District of California vacated by Judge Edward Preston Murphy. Sweigert was confirmed by the United States Senate on September 14, 1959, and received his commission on September 21, 1959. He assumed senior status on November 30, 1973, serving in that capacity until his death on February 16, 1983.

== Sources ==
Legal offices
Preceded by Edward Preston Murphy	Judge of the United States District Court for the Northern District of California; 1959–1973	Succeeded by William H. Orrick Jr.
