= Fern M. Smith =

American judge

Fern Meyerson Smith

Senior Judge of the United States District Court for the Northern District of California
- In office May 15, 2003 – June 30, 2005

Judge of the United States District Court for the Northern District of California
- In office July 27, 1988 – May 15, 2003
- Appointed by: Ronald Reagan
- Preceded by: Samuel Conti
- Succeeded by: Seat abolished by 104 Stat. 5089

Personal details
- Born: Fern Enid Meyerson; November 7, 1933 (age 92) San Francisco, California
- Education: Foothill College (A.A.); Stanford University (B.A.); Stanford Law School (J.D.)

Fern Enid Meyerson Smith (born November 7, 1933) is a former United States district judge of the United States District Court for the Northern District of California.

== Education and career ==
Born on November 7, 1933, in San Francisco, California, Smith received an Associate of Arts degree from Foothill College in 1970, a Bachelor of Arts degree from Stanford University in 1972, and a Juris Doctor from Stanford Law School in 1975. She was in private practice in San Francisco from 1975 to 1986. She was a judge of the Superior Court of the State of California, County of San Francisco from 1986 to 1988. She was the Director of the Federal Judicial Center from 1999 to 2003.

== Federal judicial service ==
Smith was nominated by President Ronald Reagan on May 9, 1988, to a seat on the United States District Court for the Northern District of California vacated by Judge Samuel Conti. She was confirmed by the United States Senate on July 26, 1988, and received her commission on July 27, 1988. She assumed senior status on May 15, 2003. Smith served in that capacity until her retirement on June 30, 2005.

== Sources ==
Legal offices
Preceded by Samuel Conti	Judge of the United States District Court for the Northern District of California; 1988–2003	Succeeded by Seat abolished by 104 Stat. 5089
