= Arthur H. Connolly Jr. =

American politician (1911–1996)

Member of the California State Assembly from the 21st district
- In office November 24, 1947 - January 5, 1953
- Preceded by: Albert C. Wollenberg
- Succeeded by: Caspar Weinberger

Personal details
- Born: May 23, 1911 Oakland, California
- Died: August 25, 1996 (aged 85) Santa Cruz, California
- Party: Republican
- Spouse: Maryon Mortell (m.1945)
- Children: 2

Military service
- Branch/service: United States Navy
- Battles/wars: World War II

Arthur H. Connolly Jr. (May 23, 1911 – August 24, 1996) served in the California State Assembly for the 21st district from 1947 to 1953. During World War II he served in the United States Navy.
