= La Oferta =

Newspaper published in San Jose

- Type: Digital newspaper
- Publisher: Franklin G. Andrade & Mary J. Andrade
- Founded: 1978
- Language: English/Spanish
- Headquarters: San Jose, CA Santa Clara County
- Circulation: 9,848
- Website: laoferta.com

La Oferta Review is a bilingual (Spanish and English) weekly newspaper in San Jose, California. First published in 1978, it is the oldest Hispanic-owned newspaper in the San Jose area. Since 1996, when its circulation stood at 25,500 printed newspapers, La Oferta has faced competition from several new Spanish-language papers in the same area. It is now limited to online publication with a circulation of a little under 10,000.

== Circulation, coverage area, and ownership ==
La Oferta Review is a bilingual English/Spanish weekly newspaper published by Franklin G. Andrade & Mary J. Andrade. Headquartered in San Jose, CA, the newspaper covers the city of San Jose and the surrounding Santa Clara county with an estimated circulation of 9, 848. The newspaper is a member of the National Association of Hispanic Publications (NAHP).

== History ==
La Oferta has been in publication since 1978, making it the oldest Hispanic-owned paper in San Jose. In 1997, the San Jose Mercury News launched the Spanish-language Nuevo Mundo, which had a negative impact on La Oferta's advertising revenue and circulation. Today, La Oferta Review does not put out a print paper; it is published on the Internet only.

== Notable coverage ==
In April 2005, the newspaper received coverage nationally as part of a story focusing on the background of a woman who claimed to have found a human finger in a bowl of chili she purchased at a Wendy's fast food restaurant in San Jose, CA. The woman, Anna Ayala, was a former employee of La Oferta Review who had sued her manager for sexual harassment. This wire story was reported by the Associated Press and ran in a number of papers including The Los Angeles Times, The Times Recorder of Zanesville, Ohio, and The Lancaster Eagle-Gazette, Ohio.

La Oferta Review Newspaper, Inc. also publishes a series of books authored by the newspaper's co-publisher Mary Andrade. Entitled Through the Eyes of the Soul, Day of the Dead in Mexico and written in Spanish and English, the books highlight cultural practices and traditions related to the Day of the Dead in different regions of Mexico.
