= Monroe Mark Friedman =

American judge

Judge of the United States District Court for the Northern District of California
- In office July 17, 1952 – August 3, 1953
- Appointed by: Harry S. Truman
- Preceded by: Herbert Wilson Erskine
- Succeeded by: Oliver Deveta Hamlin Jr.

Personal details
- Born: Monroe Mark Friedman; October 10, 1895 Minneapolis, Minnesota
- Died: November 12, 1978 (aged 83) Berkeley, California
- Education: University of California, Berkeley (A.B.); UC Berkeley School of Law (LL.B.)

Monroe Mark Friedman (October 10, 1895 – November 12, 1978) was briefly a United States district judge of the United States District Court for the Northern District of California and later a California state judge.

== Education and career ==
Born in Minneapolis, Minnesota, Friedman received an Artium Baccalaureus degree from the University of California, Berkeley in 1916 and a Bachelor of Laws from UC Berkeley School of Law in 1920. He was in private practice in Alameda County, California from 1920 to 1952.

== Federal judicial service ==
Friedman received a recess appointment from President Harry S. Truman on July 17, 1952, to a seat on the United States District Court for the Northern District of California vacated by Judge Herbert Wilson Erskine. He was nominated to the same position by President Truman on January 9, 1953. His nomination was withdrawn by President Dwight D. Eisenhower on July 24, 1953. His service terminated on August 3, 1953, after his nomination was not confirmed by the United States Senate, with the sine die adjournment of the First Session of the 83rd United States Congress.

== Later career ==
Friedman returned to private practice in Alameda County from 1953 to 1959. He was Chairman of the Hearing Board of the Bay Area Air Pollution District from 1957 to 1959. He was Presiding Judge of the Superior Court of California for Alameda County from 1959 to 1971, and a senior judge of that court from 1971 to 1975.

== Death ==
Friedman died on November 12, 1978, in Berkeley, California.

== Sources ==
Legal offices
Preceded by Herbert Wilson Erskine	Judge of the United States District Court for the Northern District of California; 1952–1953	Succeeded by Oliver Deveta Hamlin Jr.
