= William Albert Norris =

American judge (1927–2017)

Senior Judge of the United States Court of Appeals for the Ninth Circuit
- In office July 7, 1994 – October 24, 1997

Judge of the United States Court of Appeals for the Ninth Circuit
- In office June 18, 1980 – July 7, 1994
- Appointed by: Jimmy Carter
- Preceded by: Walter Raleigh Ely Jr.
- Succeeded by: William A. Fletcher

Personal details
- Born: William Albert Norris; August 30, 1927 Turtle Creek, Pennsylvania, U.S.
- Died: January 21, 2017 (aged 89) Los Angeles, California, U.S.
- Education: Princeton University (BA); Stanford University (JD)

William Albert Norris (August 30, 1927 – January 21, 2017) was a United States circuit judge of the United States Court of Appeals for the Ninth Circuit.

Norris was nominated by President Jimmy Carter on February 27, 1980, to a seat vacated by Walter Raleigh Ely, Jr. He was confirmed by the United States Senate on June 18, 1980, and received commission the same day. Assumed senior status on July 7, 1994. Norris's service was terminated on October 24, 1997, due to his retirement.

== Education and career ==
Born in Turtle Creek, Pennsylvania, Norris served in the United States Navy from 1945 to 1947. He received a Bachelor of Arts degree from Princeton University in 1951. He received a Juris Doctor from Stanford Law School in 1954. He was in private practice in Washington, D.C., from 1954 to 1955. He served as a law clerk for Justice William O. Douglas of the Supreme Court of the United States from 1955 to 1956. He returned to private practice in Los Angeles, California, from 1956 to 1980. In 1966, he successfully briefed and argued before the U.S. Supreme Court the case of California v. Stewart, one of the cases consolidated into the landmark decision of Miranda v. Arizona. In the 1970s, Norris chaired a committee created by Los Angeles Mayor Tom Bradley to create the Museum of Contemporary Art.

== Federal judicial service ==
Norris was nominated by President Jimmy Carter on February 27, 1980, to a seat on the United States Court of Appeals for the Ninth Circuit vacated by Judge Walter Raleigh Ely Jr. He was confirmed by the United States Senate on June 18, 1980, and received his commission on June 18, 1980. He assumed senior status on July 7, 1994. His service terminated on October 24, 1997, due to retirement.

== Notable case ==
Norris was known for his 1989 concurring opinion in Watkins v. U.S. Army, a case challenging the Army's policy of refusing to allow openly gay members. Judge Norris' view in that case, that sexual orientation is a suspect classification deserving of heightened scrutiny under the Constitution's Equal Protection clause, did not carry the day, but it has proven influential in many state court and lower federal court opinions striking down bans on gay marriage in the 2000s and 2010s.

== Death ==
Norris died on January 21, 2017, at his home in Bel Air, Los Angeles, California.

== See also ==
- List of law clerks for the fourth seat of the Supreme Court of the United States

Legal offices
Preceded by Walter Raleigh Ely Jr.	Judge of the United States Court of Appeals for the Ninth Circuit; 1980–1994	Succeeded by William A. Fletcher
