= United States District Court for the Northern District of California =

U.S. federal district court in California

- (N.D. Cal.)

- The district's jurisdiction by county
- Location: Phillip Burton Federal Building (San Francisco) More locations: Ronald V. Dellums Federal Building (Oakland); San Jose; Eureka / McKinleyville
- Appeals to: Ninth Circuit
- Established: August 5, 1886
- Judges: 14
- Chief Judge: Yvonne Gonzalez Rogers

Officers of the court
- U.S. Attorney: Craig H. Missakian
- U.S. Marshal: Mark Kolc (acting)
- cand.uscourts.gov

The United States District Court for the Northern District of California (in case citations, N.D. Cal.) is the federal United States district court whose jurisdiction comprises the following counties of California: Alameda, Contra Costa, Del Norte, Humboldt, Lake, Marin, Mendocino, Monterey, Napa, San Benito, San Francisco, San Mateo, Santa Clara, Santa Cruz, and Sonoma. The court hears cases in its courtrooms in Eureka, Oakland, San Francisco, and San Jose. It is headquartered in San Francisco. Cases from the Northern District of California are appealed to the United States Court of Appeals for the Ninth Circuit.

Because it covers San Francisco and Silicon Valley, the Northern District of California has become the presumptive destination for major federal lawsuits (such as large class actions and multi-district litigation) involving "Big Tech" defendants. These cases usually involve patent law and intellectual property law (such as copyright law and DMCA issues as well as trademark law and trade secret law) - especially in the semiconductor, telecommunications and software industries and other high technology areas, antitrust law, securities law, and technology law in general (e.g., cybersecurity, Internet law, computer law and cases involving software).

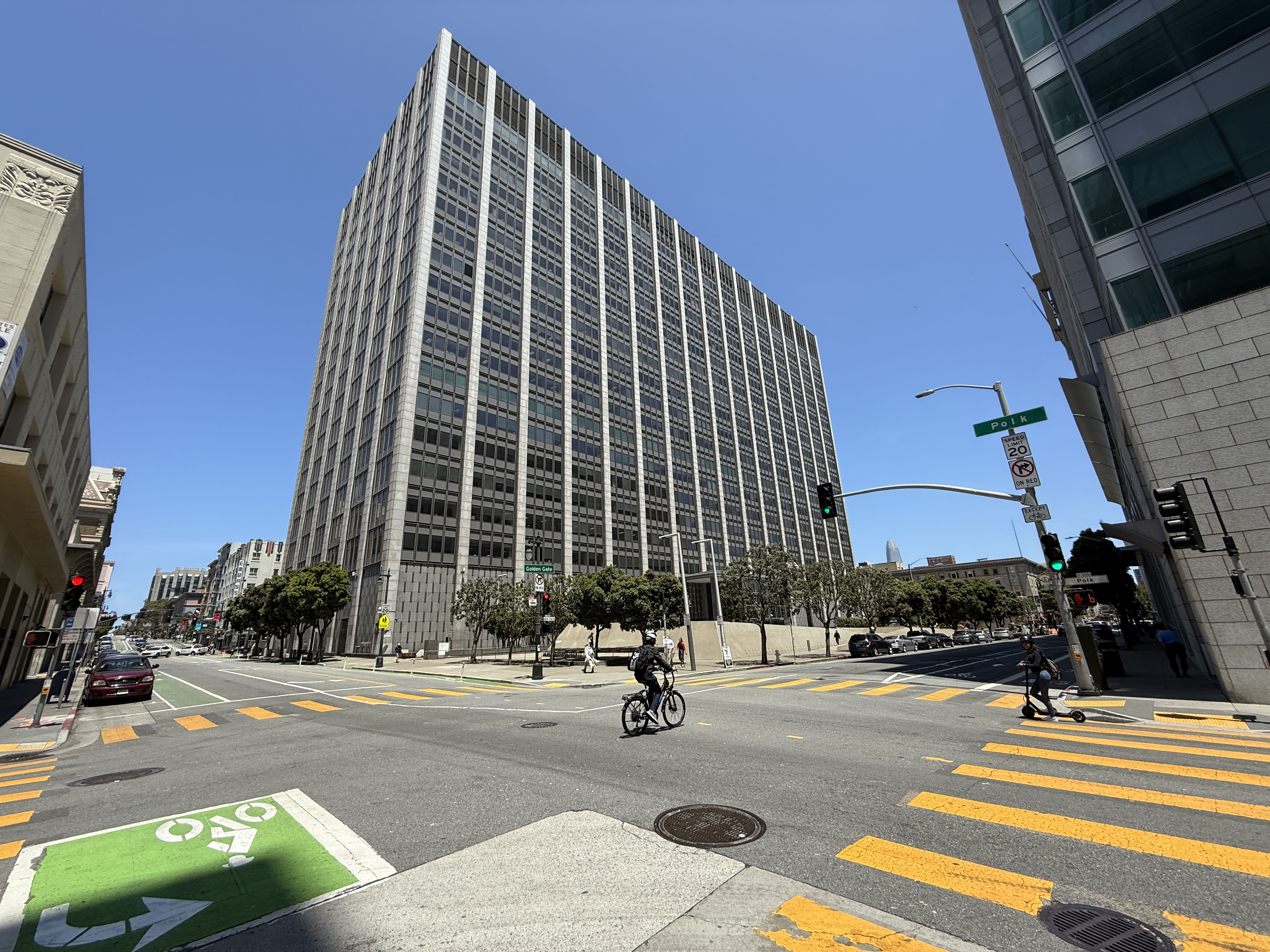
Phillip Burton Federal Building & United States Courthouse in 2025

== History ==
California was admitted as a state on September 9, 1850, and was initially divided into two districts, the Northern and the Southern, by Act of Congress approved September 28, 1850, 9 Stat. 521. The boundary line was at the 37th parallel of North Latitude. The creating act provided that:

In addition to the ordinary jurisdiction and powers of a District Court of the United States, with which the Southern District Court of New York has been invested, the said Courts be and hereby are invested respectively within the limits of its district with the exercise of concurrent jurisdiction and power in all civil cases now exercised by the Circuit Courts of the United States; and that in all cases where said Courts shall exercise such jurisdiction, appeals may be taken from the judgments, orders or decrees of said Courts to the Supreme Court of the United States.

The Act of August 31, 1852 made the Judge of the Northern District be Judge of the Southern District as well until otherwise provided, by 10 Stat. 76, 84, effectively creating a single District in all but name until an Act of January 18, 1854 provided for the appointment of a Judge for the Southern District. The Southern District of California was abolished and the State made to constitute a single district – the United States District Court for the District of California – by Act of Congress approved July 27, 1866, 14 Stat. 300.

Twenty years later, on August 5, 1886, Congress re-created the Southern District of California by 24 Stat. 308. Erskine M. Ross was appointed Judge of the new district and served until his promotion to the Circuit Judgeship, when he was succeeded by Olin Wellborn. On March 18, 1966, the Eastern and Central Districts were created from portions of the Northern and Southern Districts by 80 Stat. 75.

== Current judges ==
As of July 1, 2026:

#	Title	Judge	Duty station	Born	Term of service			Appointed by
#	Title	Judge	Duty station	Born	Active	Chief	Senior	Appointed by
63	Chief Judge	Yvonne Gonzalez Rogers	Oakland	1965	2011–present	2026–present	—	Obama
59	District Judge	Richard Seeborg	San Francisco	1956	2010–present	2021–2026	—	Obama
64	District Judge	Jon S. Tigar	Oakland	1962	2013–present	—	—	Obama
66	District Judge	James Donato	San Francisco	1960	2014–present	—	—	Obama
67	District Judge	Beth Labson Freeman	San Jose	1953	2014–present	—	—	Obama
68	District Judge	Vince Chhabria	San Francisco	1969	2014–present	—	—	Obama
69	District Judge	Haywood Gilliam	Oakland	1969	2014–present	—	—	Obama
70	District Judge	Jacqueline Scott Corley	San Francisco	1966	2022–present	—	—	Biden
71	District Judge	Trina Thompson	San Francisco	1961	2022–present	—	—	Biden
72	District Judge	Araceli Martínez-Olguín	Oakland	1977	2023–present	—	—	Biden
73	District Judge	P. Casey Pitts	San Jose	1980	2023–present	—	—	Biden
74	District Judge	Rita F. Lin	San Francisco	1978	2023–present	—	—	Biden
75	District Judge	Eumi K. Lee	San Jose	1972	2024–present	—	—	Biden
76	District Judge	Noël Wise	San Jose	1968	2024–present	—	—	Biden
38	Senior Judge	Thelton Henderson	inactive	1933	1980–1998	1990–1997	1998–present	Carter
47	Senior Judge	Saundra Brown Armstrong	inactive	1947	1991–2012	—	2012–present	G.H.W. Bush
50	Senior Judge	Claudia Ann Wilken	Oakland	1949	1993–2014	2012–2014	2014–present	Clinton
51	Senior Judge	Maxine M. Chesney	San Francisco	1942	1995–2009	—	2009–present	Clinton
52	Senior Judge	Susan Illston	San Francisco	1948	1995–2013	—	2013–present	Clinton
53	Senior Judge	Charles Breyer	San Francisco	1941	1997–2011	—	2011–present	Clinton
56	Senior Judge	William Alsup	inactive	1945	1999–2021	—	2021–present	Clinton
57	Senior Judge	Phyllis J. Hamilton	Oakland	1952	2000–2021	2014–2021	2021–present	Clinton
58	Senior Judge	Jeffrey White	Oakland	1945	2002–2021	—	2021–present	G.W. Bush
61	Senior Judge	Edward Davila	San Jose	1952	2011–2024	—	2024–present	Obama
62	Senior Judge	Edward M. Chen	San Francisco	1953	2011–2022	—	2022–present	Obama
65	Senior Judge	William Orrick III	San Francisco	1953	2013–2023	—	2023–present	Obama

== Former judges ==
#	Judge	Born–died	Active service	Chief Judge	Senior status	Appointed by	Reason for termination
1	Ogden Hoffman Jr.	1822–1891	1851–1866 (Note: From 1852 to 1854, Judge Hoffman was jointly appointed to the Northern and Southern Districts of California.); 1886–1891 (Note: Reassigned from the District of California)	—	—	Fillmore; Operation of law	reassignment death
2	William W. Morrow	1843–1929	1891–1897 (Note: Recess appointment; formally nominated on December 10, 1891, confirmed by the United States Senate on January 11, 1892, and received commission on January 11, 1892)	—	—	B. Harrison	elevation
3	John J. De Haven	1849–1913	1897–1913	—	—	McKinley	death
4	William Cary Van Fleet	1852–1923	1907–1923 (Note: Recess appointment; formally nominated on December 3, 1907, confirmed by the Senate on December 17, 1907, and received commission on December 17, 1907)	—	—	T. Roosevelt	death
5	Maurice Timothy Dooling	1860–1924	1913–1924	—	—	Wilson	death
6	John Slater Partridge	1870–1926	1923–1926	—	—	Harding	death
7	Frank Henry Kerrigan	1868–1935	1924–1935	—	—	Coolidge	death
8	Adolphus Frederic St. Sure	1869–1949	1925–1947	—	1947–1949	Coolidge	death
9	Harold Louderback	1881–1941	1928–1941	—	—	Coolidge	death
10	Michael Joseph Roche	1878–1964	1935–1958	1948–1958	1958–1964	F. Roosevelt	death
11	Martin Ignatius Welsh	1882–1953	1939–1947	—	1947–1953	F. Roosevelt	death
12	Louis Earl Goodman	1892–1961	1942–1961	1958–1961	—	F. Roosevelt	death
13	George Bernard Harris	1901–1983	1946–1970	1961–1970	1970–1983	Truman	death
14	Dal Millington Lemmon	1887–1958	1947–1954	—	—	Truman	elevation
15	Herbert Wilson Erskine	1888–1951	1949–1951	—	—	Truman	death
16	Oliver Jesse Carter	1911–1976	1950–1976	1970–1976	1976	Truman	death
17	Edward Preston Murphy	1904–1958	1950–1958	—	—	Truman	death
18	Monroe Mark Friedman	1895–1978	1952–1953 (Note: Recess appointment; the Senate later rejected the appointment)	—	—	Truman	not confirmed
19	Oliver Deveta Hamlin Jr.	1892–1973	1953–1958	—	—	Eisenhower	elevation
20	Sherrill Halbert	1901–1991	1954–1966	—	—	Eisenhower	reassignment
21	Albert Charles Wollenberg	1900–1981	1958–1975	—	1975–1981	Eisenhower	death
22	Lloyd Hudson Burke	1916–1988	1958–1988	—	—	Eisenhower	death
23	William Thomas Sweigert	1900–1983	1959–1973	—	1973–1983	Eisenhower	death
24	Thomas Jamison MacBride	1914–2000	1961–1966	—	—	Kennedy	reassignment
25	Alfonso Zirpoli	1905–1995	1961–1975	—	1975–1995	Kennedy	death
26	Stanley Alexander Weigel	1905–1999	1962–1982	—	1982–1997	Kennedy	retirement
27	Robert Francis Peckham	1920–1993	1966–1988	1976–1988	1988–1993	L. Johnson	death
28	Gerald Sanford Levin	1906–1971	1969–1971	—	—	Nixon	death
29	Robert Howard Schnacke	1913–1994	1970–1983	—	1983–1994	Nixon	death
30	Samuel Conti	1922–2018	1970–1987	—	1987–2018	Nixon	death
31	Spencer Mortimer Williams	1922–2008	1971–1987	—	1987–2008	Nixon	death
32	Charles Byron Renfrew	1928–2017	1971–1980	—	—	Nixon	resignation
33	William H. Orrick Jr.	1915–2003	1974–1985	—	1985–2003	Nixon	death
34	William Austin Ingram	1924–2002	1976–1990	1988–1990	1990–2002	Ford	death
35	Cecil F. Poole	1914–1997	1976–1980	—	—	Ford	elevation
36	William Schwarzer	1925–2017	1976–1991	—	1991–2017	Ford	death
37	Robert Peter Aguilar	1931–2020	1980–1996	—	1996–1996	Carter	retirement
39	Marilyn Hall Patel	1938–present	1980–2009	1997–2004	2009–2012	Carter	retirement
40	Eugene F. Lynch	1931–2019	1982–1997	—	1997–1997	Reagan	retirement
41	John P. Vukasin Jr.	1928–1993	1983–1993	—	—	Reagan	death
42	Charles A. Legge	1930–2023	1984–2001	—	—	Reagan	retirement
43	D. Lowell Jensen	1928–present	1986–1997	—	1997–2014	Reagan	retirement
44	Fern M. Smith	1933–present	1988–2003	—	2003–2005	Reagan	retirement
45	Vaughn Walker	1944–present	1989–2011	2004–2010	—	G.H.W. Bush	retirement
46	James Ware	1946–present	1990–2012	2010–2012	—	G.H.W. Bush	retirement
48	Barbara A. Caulfield	1947–2010	1991–1994	—	—	G.H.W. Bush	resignation
49	Ronald Whyte	1942–2023	1992–2009	—	2009–2023	G.H.W. Bush	death
54	Martin Jenkins	1953–present	1997–2008	—	—	Clinton	resignation
55	Jeremy Fogel	1949–present	1998–2014	—	2014–2018	Clinton	retirement
60	Lucy Koh	1968–present	2010–2021	—	—	Obama	elevation

== Chief judges ==
Chief judges have administrative responsibilities with respect to their district court. Unlike the Supreme Court, where one justice is specifically nominated to be chief, the office of chief judge rotates among the district court judges. To be chief, a judge must have been in active service on the court for at least one year, be under the age of 65, and have not previously served as chief judge.

A vacancy is filled by the judge highest in seniority among the group of qualified judges. The chief judge serves for a term of seven years, or until age 70, whichever occurs first. The age restrictions are waived if no members of the court would otherwise be qualified for the position.

When the office was created in 1948, the chief judge was the longest-serving judge who had not elected to retire, on what has since 1958 been known as senior status, or declined to serve as chief judge. After August 6, 1959, judges could not become or remain chief after turning 70 years old. The current rules have been in operation since October 1, 1982.

== Succession of seats ==
Seat 1
Seat established on September 28, 1850 by 9 Stat. 521
Hoffman, Jr.	1851–1866
Seat made concurrent with Southern District on August 31, 1852 by 10 Stat. 76, 84
Seat reassigned solely to Northern District on January 18, 1854 by 10 Stat. 265
Seat reassigned to District of California on July 27, 1866 by 14 Stat. 300
Seat reassigned to Northern District on August 5, 1886 by 24 Stat. 308
Hoffman, Jr.	1886–1891
Morrow	1891–1897
DeHaven	1897–1913
Dooling	1913–1924
St. Sure	1925–1947
Erskine	1949–1951
Friedman	1952–1953
Hamlin, Jr.	1953–1958
Burke	1958–1988
Seat abolished in 1988 (temporary judgeship expired)

Seat 2
Seat established on March 2, 1907 by 34 Stat. 1253
Van Fleet	1907–1923
Kerrigan	1924–1935
Roche	1935–1958
Wollenberg	1958–1975
Schwarzer	1976–1991
Caulfield	1991–1994
Illston	1995–2013
Chhabria	2014–present

Seat 3
Seat established on September 14, 1922 by 42 Stat. 837 (temporary)
Partridge	1923–1926
Seat made permanent on March 3, 1927 by 44 Stat. 1372
Louderback	1928–1941
Goodman	1942–1961
Weigel	1962–1982
Vukasin, Jr.	1983–1993
Chesney	1995–2009
Seeborg	2010–present

Seat 4
Seat established on May 31, 1938 by 52 Stat. 584, 585
Welsh	1939–1947
Lemmon	1947–1954
Halbert	1954–1966
Seat reassigned to Eastern District on September 18, 1966 by 80 Stat. 75

Seat 5
Seat established on June 15, 1946 by 60 Stat. 260
Harris	1946–1970
Schnacke	1970–1983
Legge	1984–2001
White	2002–2021
Martínez-Olguín	2023–present

Seat 6
Seat established on August 3, 1949 by 63 Stat. 493
Carter	1950–1976
Poole	1976–1980
Henderson	1980–1998
Alsup	1999–2021
Corley	2022–present

Seat 7
Seat established on August 3, 1949 by 63 Stat. 493
Murphy	1950–1958
Sweigert	1959–1973
W.H. Orrick, Jr.	1974–1985
Jensen	1986–1997
Breyer	1997–2011
W.H. Orrick III	2013–2023
Lee	2024–present

Seat 8
Seat established on May 19, 1961 by 75 Stat. 80
MacBride	1961–1966
Seat reassigned to Eastern District on September 18, 1966 by 80 Stat. 75

Seat 9
Seat established on May 19, 1961 by 75 Stat. 80
Zirpoli	1961–1975
Ingram	1976–1990
Armstrong	1991–2012
Tigar	2013–present

Seat 10
Seat established on March 18, 1966 by 80 Stat. 75
Peckham	1966–1988
Ware	1990–2012
Donato	2014–present

Seat 11
Seat established on March 18, 1966 by 80 Stat. 75
Levin	1969–1971
Renfrew	1971–1980
Lynch	1982–1997
Jenkins	1997–2008
Chen	2011–2022
Lin	2023–present

Seat 12
Seat established on June 2, 1970 by 84 Stat. 294
Conti	1970–1987
Smith	1988–2003
Seat abolished on May 15, 2003 (temporary judgeship expired)

Seat 13
Seat established on June 2, 1970 by 84 Stat. 294
Williams	1971–1987
Walker	1989–2011
Gonzalez Rogers	2011–present

Seat 14
Seat established on October 20, 1978 by 92 Stat. 1629
Aguilar	1980–1996
Fogel	1998–2014
Seat abolished on December 31, 2014 (temporary judgeship expired)

Seat 15
Seat established on September 18, 1979 pursuant to 71 Stat. 586 (temporary)
Seat became permanent upon the abolition of Seat 1 on March 15, 1988
Patel	1980–2009
Davila	2011–2024
Wise	2024–present

Seat 16
Seat established on December 1, 1990 by 104 Stat. 5089
Whyte	1992–2009
Koh	2010–2021
Pitts	2023–present

Seat 17
Seat established on December 1, 1990 by 104 Stat. 5089
Wilken	1993–2014
Gilliam, Jr.	2014–present

Seat 18
Seat established on February 9, 2000 pursuant to 104 Stat. 5089 (temporary)
Seat became permanent upon the abolition of Seat 12 on May 15, 2003
Hamilton	2000–2021
Thompson	2022–present

Seat 19
Seat established on October 3, 2011 pursuant to 104 Stat. 5089 (temporary)
Seat became permanent upon the abolition of Seat 14 on December 31, 2014
Freeman	2014–present

== United States attorney ==
The United States Attorney for the Northern District of California represents the United States in civil and criminal litigation in the court. As of February 13, 2025 the United States attorney is Patrick D Robbins.

- Calhoun Benham 1850-53
- Samuel Williams Inge 1853-56
- William Blanding 1856-57
- Peter della Torre 1857-60
- Calhoun Benham 1860-61
- William H. Sharp 1861-64
- Delos Lake 1864-69
- Frank M. Pixley 1869
- Lorenzo D. Latimer 1869-73
- Walter Van Dyke 1873-76
- John M. Coghlan 1876-78
- Phillip Teare 1878-83
- Samuel G. Hilborn 1883-86
- John T. Carey 1886-90
- Charles A. Garter 1890-94
- Samuel Knight 1894-95
- Henry S. Foote 1895-99
- Frank L. Coombs 1899-1901
- Marshall B. Woodworth 1901-05
- Robert T. Devlin 1905-12
- John L. McNab 1912-13
- B. L. McKinley 1913
- John W. Preston 1913-18
- Mrs. A. A. Adams 1918-20
- Frank M. Silva 1920-21
- J. T. Williams 1921-24
- Sterling Carr 1924-25
- George J. Hatfield 1925-33
- I. M. Peckham 1933
- Harry H. McPike 1933-37
- Frank J. Hennessy 1937-51
- Chauncey F. Tramutolo 1951
- Lloyd H. Burke 1953-58
- Robert H. Schnacke 1958-59
- Lynn J. Gillard 1959-60
- Laurence E. Dayton 1960-61
- Cecil F. Poole 1961-69
- James L. Browning, Jr. 1969-77
- G. William Hunter 1977-81
- Rodney H. Hamblen 1981
- Joseph P. Russoniello 1981-90
- William T. McGivern 1990-92
- John A. Mendez 1992-93
- Michael J. Yamaguchi 1993-98
- Robert S. Mueller 1998-2001
- Kevin V. Ryan 2002-2007
- Scott Schools 2007-2008
- Joseph P. Russoniello 2008-2010
- Melinda Haag 2010-2016
- David L. Anderson 2019-2021
- Stephanie Hinds (acting) 2021–2023
- Ismail Ramsey 2023-2025
- Patrick D Robbins (acting) 2025
- Craig H. Missakian 2025-Present

== See also ==
- Courts of California
- List of current United States district judges
- List of United States federal courthouses in California
