= Lloyd Hudson Burke =

American judge

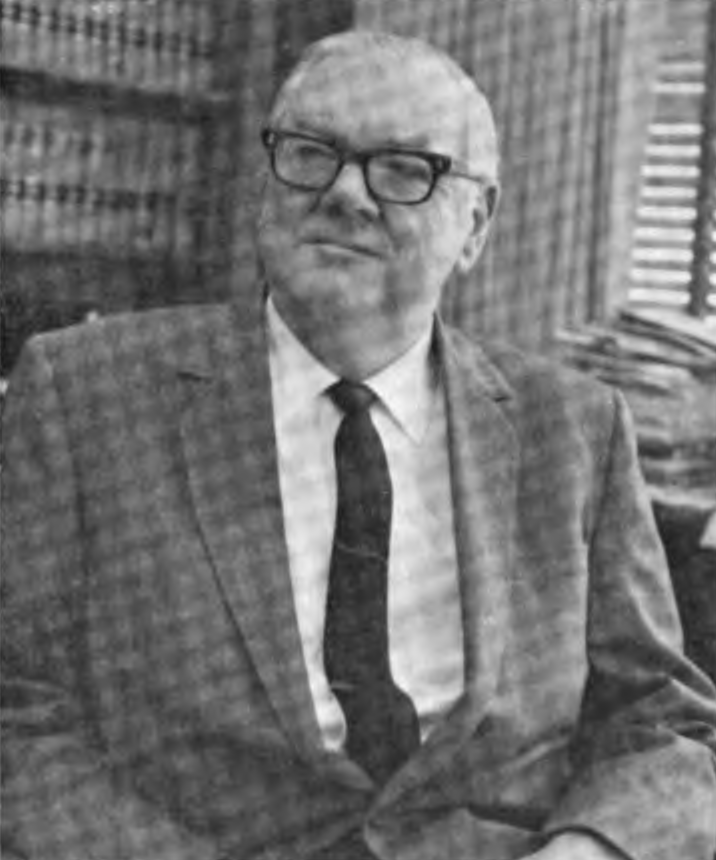

Judge of the United States District Court for the Northern District of California
- In office July 21, 1958 – March 15, 1988
- Appointed by: Dwight D. Eisenhower
- Preceded by: Oliver Deveta Hamlin Jr.
- Succeeded by: Seat abolished

Personal details
- Born: Lloyd Hudson Burke; April 1, 1916 Oakland, California
- Died: March 15, 1988 (aged 71) Oakland, California
- Education: Saint Mary's College of California (A.B.); UC Berkeley School of Law (LL.B.)

Lloyd Hudson Burke (April 1, 1916 – March 15, 1988) was a United States district judge of the United States District Court for the Northern District of California.

== Education and career ==
Born in Oakland, California, Burke received an Artium Baccalaureus degree from Saint Mary's College of California in 1937 and a Bachelor of Laws from the UC Berkeley School of Law in 1940. He was a deputy district attorney of Alameda County, California from 1940 to 1953, and was a Sergeant in the United States Army Infantry during World War II, from 1942 to 1946, remaining a United States Army Reserve Captain from 1946 to 1952. He was the United States Attorney for the Northern District of California from 1953 to 1958.

== Federal judicial service ==
On June 27, 1958, Burke was nominated by President Dwight D. Eisenhower to a seat on the United States District Court for the Northern District of California vacated by Judge Oliver Deveta Hamlin Jr. Burke was confirmed by the United States Senate on July 21, 1958, and received his commission the same day. On September 18, 1979, President Jimmy Carter certified Burke involuntarily as disabled due to hypertension pursuant to the act of September 2, 1957, 71 Stat. 586, which authorized the President to appoint an additional judge for the court and provided that no successor to the judge certified as disabled be appointed. Marilyn Hall Patel was appointed to the additional judgeship. Burke continued to serve in a reduced capacity until his death of complications of pneumonia on March 15, 1988, in Oakland. He was the last district judge who continued to serve in active service appointed by President Eisenhower.

== Sources ==
Legal offices
Preceded by Oliver Deveta Hamlin Jr.	Judge of the United States District Court for the Northern District of California; 1958–1979	Succeeded by Seat abolished
