= William H. Orrick Jr. =

American judge (1915-2003)

Senior Judge of the United States District Court for the Northern District of California
- In office October 31, 1985 – August 14, 2003

Judge of the United States District Court for the Northern District of California
- In office July 8, 1974 – October 31, 1985
- Appointed by: Richard Nixon
- Preceded by: William Thomas Sweigert
- Succeeded by: D. Lowell Jensen

United States Assistant Attorney General for the Antitrust Division
- In office 1963–1965
- President: John F. Kennedy; Lyndon B. Johnson

United States Assistant Attorney General for the Civil Division
- In office 1961–1962
- President: John F. Kennedy
- Preceded by: George Cochran Doub
- Succeeded by: John W. Douglas

Personal details
- Born: William Horsley Orrick Jr. October 10, 1915 San Francisco, California
- Died: August 14, 2003 (aged 87) San Francisco, California
- Spouse(s): Marion Naffziger (died 1995); Suzanne Rogers
- Children: 3, including William III
- Relatives: Andrew Downey Orrick
- Education: Yale University (BA); University of California, Berkeley (LLB)

William Horsley Orrick Jr. (October 10, 1915 – August 14, 2003) was an American attorney and judge. He served as a United States district judge for United States District Court for the Northern District of California. From 1963 to 1965, he served as Assistant Attorney General for the Department of Justice Antitrust Division.

== Early life and education ==
Orrick was born on October 10, 1915, in San Francisco, California, to William Horsley Orrick Sr. He had a brother, Andrew Downey Orrick, who would become acting Chairman of the United States Securities and Exchange Commission in San Francisco. He attended The Thacher School and Hotchkiss School. He received a Bachelor of Arts degree from Yale College in 1937, where he was a member of the Skull and Bones Society. He attended Stanford Graduate School of Business from January to June 1938. He received a Bachelor of Laws from the UC Berkeley School of Law in 1941. He was in private practice of law in San Francisco from 1941 to 1942.

He joined the United States Army in May 1942 and attended basic training McClellan Air Force Base, California. After basic training, he was assigned to the Counterintelligence Corps in San Francisco. He also served in Washington, D.C. and completed his service in June 1946 as a captain.

== Career ==
He was in private practice of law in San Francisco from 1946 to 1961. He was an Assistant United States Attorney General of the Civil Division of the United States Department of Justice from 1961 to 1962. He was Deputy United States Undersecretary of State for Administration at the United States Department of State from 1962 to 1963. He was an Assistant United States Attorney General of the Antitrust Division of the United States Department of Justice from 1963 to 1965. He was in private practice of law in San Francisco from 1965 to 1974.

=== Federal judicial service ===
On May 31, 1974, Orrick was nominated by President Richard Nixon to a seat on the United States District Court for the Northern District of California vacated by Judge William Thomas Sweigert. Orrick was confirmed by the United States Senate on June 21, 1974, and received his commission on July 8, 1974. He was the judge in the Patty Hearst sentencing in 1976. He assumed senior status on October 31, 1985, serving in that status until his death.

== Personal life ==
Orrick's first wife was Marion Naffziger, daughter of Howard Christian Naffziger. She and Orrick had three children, Mary Louise, Marion, and William Orrick III. Naffziger died in 1995, and Orrick later married Suzanne Rogers. Orrick died on August 14, 2003, in San Francisco.

Legal offices
Preceded by William Thomas Sweigert	Judge of the United States District Court for the Northern District of California; 1974–1985	Succeeded by D. Lowell Jensen
