= List of University of California, Berkeley alumni in politics and government =

This page lists notable alumni and students of the University of California, Berkeley. Alumni who also served as faculty are listed in bold font, with degree and year.

Notable faculty members are in the article List of UC Berkeley faculty.

== Royalty ==
- Haakon VIII, B.A. 1999 – King of Norway
- Prince Friso of Orange-Nassau (attended College of Engineering 1986–1988) – Prince of Orange-Nassau, Netherlands; second son of Queen Beatrix of the Netherlands and Prince Claus von Amsberg
- Princess Laurentien of the Netherlands (Laurentien Brinkhorst), M.Jour. 1991 – Princess of Orange-Nassau, Netherlands; wife of Prince Constantijn of the Netherlands and daughter of the Dutch minister of Economic Affairs, Laurens-Jan Brinkhorst and Jantien Brinkhorst-Heringa

== Heads of state or government ==
- Pedro Nel Ospina Vázquez, B.A. 1882 – President of Colombia (1922–1926)
- Francisco I. Madero (attended 1892–1893) – President of Mexico (1911–1913)
- Sun Fo, B.A. 1916 – Premier of the Republic of China, president of National Chiao Tung University, chairman of the board of trustees of Soochow University
- Zulfikar Ali Bhutto, B.A. 1950 – President of Pakistan (1971–1973), Prime Minister of Pakistan (1973–1977), father of Benazir Bhutto
- Miguel Ángel Rodríguez, M.A. 1966, Ph.D. 1966 – President of Costa Rica (1998–2002)
- Andrej Bajuk, M.S. 1972 – Prime Minister of Slovenia
- Ruhakana Rugunda, M.S. 1977 – Prime Minister of Uganda

== Governors ==
- Edmund G. Brown Jr., B.A. 1961 – Governor of California
- C.C. Young, B.L. 1892 – Governor of California
- James H. Budd, A.B. 1873 – Governor of California
- John Morton Eshleman, B.A. 1903, M.A. 1905 – Lieutenant Governor of California (1915–1916)
- John Garamendi, BA 1966 – Lieutenant Governor of California (2007–2009)
- Neil Goldschmidt, J.D. 1967 – Governor of Oregon (1987–1991)
- Walter A. Gordon, B.A. 1918, J.D. 1922 – University of California's first All-American, first African American graduate of Berkeley Law, Governor of the United States Virgin Islands, Federal District Judge, member of National Football Foundation Hall of Fame
- Jennifer Granholm, B.A. 1984, J.D. – Governor of Michigan (2003–2011), first woman to hold this position in the state of Michigan; instructor at UC Berkeley after her governorship
- Richard Lamm, J.D. 1961 – Governor of Colorado (1975–1987)
- Sione Manu'uli Luani – Governor of Vava'u, Tonga (2009–2010)
- Ellis E. Patterson, A.B. 1921 – Lieutenant Governor of California (1939–1943)
- James Soong, M.A. 1967 – Governor of Taiwan Province
- Earl Warren, B.A. 1912, LL.B. 1914 – Attorney General of California, 1939–1943; Governor of California, 1943–1953; 14th Chief Justice of the United States Supreme Court from 1953 to 1969
- Pete Wilson, J.D. 1962 – U.S. Senator, Governor of California
- George C. Pardee, (attended 1903–1907) – Governor of California
- Hiram W. Johnson, (attended 1911–1917) – Governor of California and US Senator (1917–1945)
- Ridwan Kamil, M.U.D. 2001 – Governor of West Java, Indonesia

== Executive council members ==
The following served as cabinet-level officials.

- Jerome Adams, M.P.H. 2000 – Surgeon General of the United States
- Andrej Bajuk, M.S. 1972 – Minister of Finance of the Republic of Slovenia, Prime Minister of Slovenia (May–November 2000)
- Ruhakana Rugunda, M.S. 1977 – Prime Minister of the Republic of Uganda
- Sandra Black, BA 1991 – member of the White House Council of Economic Advisers
- W. Michael Blumenthal, B.S. 1951 – United States Secretary of the Treasury (1977–1979)
- Michael Boskin, B.A. 1967, Ph.D. 1971 – chair, Presidential Council of Economic Advisors, professor at Stanford University
- Mostafa Chamran, PhD 1963 – former Iranian minister of defense
- Prithviraj Chavan M.S. 1967 – Chief Minister of the Indian state of Maharashtra, Member of Parliament in the Rajya Sabha (India's Upper house of Parliament), currently a Minister of State in the prime minister's Office, Government of India
- Steven Chu, PhD 1976, United States Secretary of Energy (2009–2013)
- Lydia Dunn, Baroness Dunn, B.S. 1964 – Life peer in the House of Lords (1990–present); senior unofficial member of the Hong Kong Legislative Council (1985–1988); senior unofficial member of the Hong Kong Executive Council (1988–1995); non-executive deputy chairman of HSBC (1992–2008)
- Laura Giuliano, PhD 2003 – adviser to White House Council of Economic Advisers
- Neil Goldschmidt, J.D. 1967 – United States Secretary of Transportation (1979–1981)
- Judith Heumann, M.P.H. 1975 – pioneer for disability rights and former Assistant United States Secretary of Education
- Raffi Hovannisian, 1977 (attended) – former Foreign Minister of Armenia
- Dorodjatun Kuntjoro-Jakti, M.A. 1966, Ph.D 1980 – former coordinating minister for economic affairs of the Republic of Indonesia; former Indonesian ambassador to the United States
- Franklin Lane, 1887 – United States Secretary of the Interior (1913 to 1920), Interstate Commerce Commission (1905–1913), 1902 Democratic nominee for Governor of California
- Ray Marshall, Ph.D. 1954 – United States Secretary of Labor (1977–1981), professor emeritus of Economics and Public Affairs at the University of Texas at Austin
- Robert McNamara, B.A. 1937 – president of World Bank (1968–1981), United States Secretary of Defense (1961–1968), president of Ford Motor Company (1960)
- G. William Miller, J.D. 1952 – United States Secretary of the Treasury (1979–1981), Chairman of the Federal Reserve (1978–1979)
- Norman Mineta, B.S. 1953 – Congressman (D-California) (1975–1995), United States Secretary of Transportation (2001–2006), United States Secretary of Commerce (2000–2001)
- Widjojo Nitisastro, PhD 1961 – former Indonesian Minister for Economy, Finance and Industry
- Rodrigo Rato, M.B.A. 1974 – Spain's former minister of economy, managing director of International Monetary Fund (IMF) (2004–2007)
- Jesse Rothstein, PhD – senior economist for the White House Council of Economic Advisers
- Dean Rusk (studied law, Class of 1940) – United States Secretary of State (1961–1969)
- Robert Seamans, PhD – adviser to White House Council of Economic Advisers
- Jay Shambaugh, PhD 2002 – member of the White House Council of Economic Advisers
- James Stock, M.A. 1982, PhD 1983 – member of the White House Council of Economic Advisers
- Ann Veneman, M.P.P. 1971 – United States Secretary of Agriculture (2001–2005); executive director of UNICEF (2005–present)

== Judges ==
- Robert Aguilar, B.A., 1954, J.D., 1958 – judge, U.S. District Court for the Northern District of California
- Richard G. Andrews, J.D., 1981 – judge, U.S. District Court for the District of Delaware
- Stanley Barnes, A.B., 1924, J.D., 1927 – judge, U.S. Court of Appeals for the Ninth Circuit
- Marsha Berzon, J.D., 1973 – judge, U.S. Court of Appeals for the Ninth Circuit
- Rose Bird, J.D., 1965 – first female chief justice of the California Supreme Court
- Charles R. Breyer, J.D., 1966 – judge, U.S. District Court for the Northern District of California
- Allen Broussard, B.A., 1950, J.D., 1953 – associate justice of the California Supreme Court
- Lloyd Hudson Burke, LL.B., 1940 – judge, U.S. District Court for the Northern District of California
- Edward M. Chen, B.A., 1975, J.D., 1979 – judge, U.S. District Court for the Northern District of California
- Maxine M. Chesney, B.A., 1964, J.D., 1967 – judge, U.S. District Court for the Northern District of California
- Vince Girdhari Chhabria, J.D., 1998 – judge, U.S. District Court for the Northern District of California
- William Perry Copple, B.A., 1948, J.D., 1951 – judge, U.S. District Court for the District of Arizona
- Myron Donovan Crocker, LL.B., 1940 – judge, U.S. District Court for the Southern District of California, Eastern District of California
- Frank C. Damrell Jr., B.A., 1961 – judge, U.S. District Court for the Eastern District of California
- George B. Daniels, J.D., 1978 – judge, U.S. District Court for the Southern District of New York
- William Denman, B.Litt., 1894 – judge, U.S. Court of Appeals for the Ninth Circuit
- James Donato, B.A. 1983 – judge, U.S. District Court for the Northern District of California
- Joan Donoghue, J.D. 1978 – judge, International Court of Justice
- Miranda Du, J.D., 1994 – judge, U.S. District Court for the District of Nevada
- Herbert Wilson Erskine, A.B., 1908 – judge, U.S. District Court for the Northern District of California
- Michael W. Fitzgerald, J.D., 1985 – judge, U.S. District Court for the Central District of California
- Beth Labson Freeman, B.A., 1976 – judge, U.S. District Court for the Northern District of California
- Monroe Mark Friedman, A.B., 1916, LL.B., 1920 – judge, U.S. District Court for the Northern District of California
- Lloyd D. George, J.D., 1961 – judge, U.S. District Court for the District of Nevada
- Steven Gonzalez, J.D., 1991 – associate justice, Washington Supreme Court
- Louis Earl Goodman, B.A., 1913 – judge, U.S. District Court for the Northern District of California
- Sherrill Halbert, A.B., 1924, J.D., 1927 – judge, U.S. District Court for the Northern District of California
- Oliver Deveta Hamlin, Jr., B.L., 1914 – judge, U.S. Court of Appeals for the Ninth Circuit, U.S. District Court for the Northern District of California
- Thelton Henderson, B.A., 1956, J.D., 1962 – judge, U.S. District Court for the Northern District of California
- Harry Aaron Hollzer, B.L., 1902, LL.B., 1903 – judge, U.S. District Court for the Southern District of California
- Sandra Segal Ikuta, A.B., 1976 – judge, U.S. Court of Appeals for the Ninth Circuit
- Anthony W. Ishii, J.D., 1973 – judge, U.S. District Court for the Eastern District of California
- Lance Ito, J.D. 1975 – judge, Los Angeles County Superior Court, presided over O. J. Simpson trial
- D. Lowell Jensen, A.B., 1949, LL.B., 1952 – judge, U.S. District Court for the Northern District of California
- Alan Cooke Kay, LL.B., 1960 – judge, U.S. District Court for the District of Hawaii
- William Duffy Keller, B.S., 1956 – judge, U.S. District Court for the Central District of California
- David Vreeland Kenyon, B.A., 1952 – judge, U.S. District Court for the Central District of California
- Gerald Sanford Levin, A.B., 1927, LL.D., 1930 – judge, U.S. District Court for the Northern District of California
- M. James Lorenz, B.A., 1957 – judge, U.S. District Court for the Southern District of California
- Thomas Jamison MacBride, A.B., 1936, J.D., 1940 – judge, U.S. District Court for the Northern District of California, Eastern District of California
- Kiyo A. Matsumoto, B.A 1976 – judge, U.S. District Court for the Eastern District of New York
- Linda Hodge McLaughlin, LL.B., 1966 – judge, U.S. District Court for the Central District of California
- Charles Merton Merrill, A.B., 1928 – judge, U.S. Court of Appeals for the Ninth Circuit
- Frank C. Newman, LL.B., 1941 – associate justice, California Supreme Court
- Fernando M. Olguin, M.A., J.D., 1989 – judge, U.S. District Court for the Central District of California
- Lawrence Joseph O'Neill, B.A., 1973 – judge, U.S. District Court for the Eastern District of California
- William Horsley Orrick, Jr., LL.B., 1941 – judge, U.S. District Court for the Northern District of California
- John B. Owens, B.A., 1993 – judge, U.S. Court of Appeals for the Ninth Circuit
- Richard Paez, J.D., 1972 – judge, U.S. Court of Appeals for the Ninth Circuit, U.S. District Court for the Central District of California
- John Slater Partridge, A.B., 1892, A.M., 1894 – judge, U.S. District Court for the Northern District of California
- Virginia A. Phillips, J.D., 1982 – judge, U.S. District Court for the Central District of California
- Harry Pregerson, LL.B., 1950 – judge, U.S. Court of Appeals for the Ninth Circuit, U.S. District Court for the Central District of California
- Edward Dean Price, A.B., 1947, LL.B., 1949 – judge, U.S. District Court for the Eastern District of California
- Jane A. Restani, B.A., 1969 – judge, U.S. Court of International Trade
- Cruz Reynoso, LL.B., 1958 – first Latino Associate Justice of the California Supreme Court
- Edward Joseph Schwartz, A.B., 1934 – judge, U.S. District Court for the Southern District of California
- Milton Lewis Schwartz, A.B., 1941, J.D., 1948 – judge, U.S. District Court for the Eastern District of California
- William B. Shubb, A.B., 1960, J.D., 1963 – judge, U.S. District Court for the Eastern District of California
- James Keith Singleton, Jr., A.B., 1961, LL.B., 1964 – judge, U.S. District Court for the District of Alaska
- Indira Talwani, J.D., 1988 – judge, U.S. District Court for the District of Massachusetts
- Amul Thapar, J.D., 1994 – judge, U.S. District Court for the Eastern District of Kentucky
- Jon S. Tigar, J.D., 1989 – judge, U.S. District Court for the Northern District of California
- Roger J. Traynor, B.A. 1923, Ph.D. 1926, J.D. 1927 – Chief Justice of the California Supreme Court (1964–1970)
- John P. Vukasin Jr., A.B., 1950, J.D., 1956 – judge, U.S. District Court for the Northern District of California
- John Clifford Wallace, LL.B., 1955 – judge, U.S. Court of Appeals for the Ninth Circuit, U.S. District Court for the Southern District of California
- Evan Wallach, J.D., 1976 – judge, U.S. Court of Appeals for the Federal Circuit
- Oliver Winston Wanger, LL.B., 1966 – judge, U.S. District Court for the Eastern District of California
- Earl Warren, B.A. 1912, J.D. 1914 – 14th Chief Justice of the United States Supreme Court (1953–1969) (also listed in Governors section and Attorneys section)
- Paul J. Watford, B.A., 1989 – judge, U.S. Court of Appeals for the Ninth Circuit
- Kathryn Werdegar, B.A., 1962 – associate justice, California Supreme Court
- Francis C. Whelan, LL.B., J.D., 1932 – judge, U.S. District Court for the Central District of California, Southern District of California
- Claudia Ann Wilken, J.D., 1975 – judge, U.S. District Court for the Northern District of California
- Spencer Mortimer Williams, LL.B., 1948 – judge, U.S. District Court for the Northern District of California
- David John Wilson, J.D., 1919 – judge, U.S. Customs Court
- Albert Charles Wollenberg, A.B., 1922, J.D., 1924 – judge, U.S. District Court for the Northern District of California
- Alfonso Zirpoli, A.B., 1926, J.D., 1928 – judge, U.S. District Court for the Northern District of California

== Legislators ==
- Dick Ackerman, B.A. 1964 – former California State Senate Republican Leader
- Katherine B. Aguon – Guamanian educator and politician.
- Colin Allred, J.D. 2014 – Congressman (D-Texas) (2018–present)
- Sam Blakeslee, B.S., M.S. – California State Senator and former California State Assembly Republican Leader
- Christopher Cabaldon, B.S. 1988 - California State Senator (2024-present)
- Robert Campbell, M.A. 1964 – former member of the state Assembly (D-Richmond) (1980–1996)
- Stephen W. Cunningham – first UCLA graduate manager and Los Angeles City Council member, 1933–41
- Susan Davis, B.A. 1965 – Congresswoman (D-CA) (2001–2021)
- Ron Dellums, M.S.W. 1962 – Congressman
- Grace S. Dorris, 1909 – Member of the California State Assembly (1919–1921; 1923–1927)
- Vernon Ehlers, Ph.D. 1960 – Congressman (R-Michigan) (1993–2011)
- John A. Elston, 1897 – Congressman (P and R-California) (1915–1921)
- Jesse Gabriel, California State Assemblyman
- John Garamendi, B.S. 1966 – Congressman (D-California) (2009–present)
- Craig Hosmer, B.A. 1937 – Congressman (D-California) (1953–1974)
- Crystal Brilliant Snow Jenne – member of the Alaska Territorial House of Representatives (1940–1944)
- William F. Knowland, B.A. 1929 – US Senator (R-California) (1945–1959); US Senate Majority Leader (1953–1955) US Senate Minority Leader (1955–1959)
- Tom Lantos, Ph.D 1953 – Congressman (D-California) (1981–2008)
- Mohammad Javad Larijani, Ph.D. – former Member of Parliament, Iran
- Barbara Lee, M.S.W. 1975 – Congresswoman (D-Oakland) (1998–present)
- Mel Levine, B.A. 1964 – Congressman (D-California) (1983–1993)
- Doris Matsui, B.A. 1966 – Congresswoman (D-California) replacing her deceased husband, Robert Matsui
- Robert Matsui, B.A. 1963 – Congressman (D-California) (1993–2005)
- Cynthia McKinney, Ph.D. candidate – Congresswoman (D-Georgia) (1997–2007)
- Norman Mineta, B.S. 1953 – Congressman (D-California) (1975–1995), United States Secretary of Transportation (2001–2006), United States Secretary of Commerce (2000–2001)
- Dan K. Morhaim, B.A. 1970 – Maryland legislator
- Nicole Parra, B.A. 1992 – California state Assemblywoman (2002–present)
- Ira Ruskin, B.A. 1968 – Democratic California State Assemblyman (21 Assembly District) (2004–2010)
- Linda Sánchez, B.A. 1991 – Congresswoman (2002–present)
- Dalip Singh Saund, M.A. 1922, Ph.D. 1924 – first Indian American Congressman (D-California) (1957–1963), mathematician
- Peter F. Schabarum, B.S. 1951 – California state Assemblyman (1966–1972), Los Angeles County Board of Supervisors (1972–1991)
- Todd Spitzer, M.P.P. 1989 – California State Assemblyman
- Emily Stonington, M.A. – member of the Montana House of Representatives and Montana Senate
- Roy A. Vitousek, B.S. 1912 – Member of the Hawaii Territorial House of Representatives from 1922 to 1944; Speaker of the House 1931–1932, 1935–1940, and 1943–1944
- Peter Welch, J.D. 1973 – Congressman (2007–2023); US Senator (D-Vermont) (2023–present)

== Directors ==
- Basim Elkarra – director of Sacramento Chapter of Council on American-Islamic Relations; civil rights leader; serves on the Executive Board of the California Democratic Party; former board member of the Sacramento chapter of the American Civil Liberties Union; member of Twin Rivers Unified School District Board of Trustees
- Horace Albright, B.A. 1912 – conservationist, helped establish the National Park Service (with Stephen Mather, Class of 1887), second director of the National Park Service, awarded the Medal of Freedom
- Harvey Oren Banks, Ph.D. 1964 – State Engineer of California (1955), first director of the California Department of Water Resources (1956–1961)
- G. Wayne Clough. Ph.D. 1969 – 12th Secretary of the Smithsonian Institution (2008–present); former president of Georgia Tech (see above)
- James P. Cooper, B.A. 1980 – first director of quality assurance, Office of Finance, United States House of Representatives (2020-2025)
- Nicolle Devenish, B.A. 1994 – White House Communications Director (2004–2006)
- Newton B. Drury, B.A. 1912 – conservationist, fourth director of the National Park Service
- Julie Gerberding, M.P.H. 1990 – director of the Centers for Disease Control (2002–2009)
- Stephen Mather, 1887 – conservationist, founding director of the National Park Service
- John McCone, B.S. 1922 – director of the Central Intelligence Agency (CIA) (1961–1965)
- Marc Pachter, B.A. 1964 – director of the National Portrait Gallery, Washington, D.C. (2000–2007); acting director of the National Museum of American History, Washington, D.C. (2000–2003)

== Mayors ==
- Jesse Arreguín, B.A. 2007 – Mayor of Berkeley, California (2016– Incumbent)
- Jerry Brown, B.A. 1961 – Mayor of Oakland (listed under Governors section)
- Christopher Cabaldon, B.S. 1987 – Mayor of West Sacramento, California
- Cho Soon, Ph.D. 1964 – first elected Mayor of Seoul (1995–1997)
- Shirley Dean, B.A. 1956 – Mayor of Berkeley, California (1994–2002)
- Bob Holcomb, B.A. 1949 – Longest-serving mayor of San Bernardino, California (1971–1985, 1989–1993)
- Kevin Johnson, B.A. 1997 – Mayor of Sacramento, retired professional NBA basketball player
- Ed Lee, J.D. 1978 – 43rd mayor of San Francisco, first Asian-American mayor in San Francisco's history
- Frank Otis, 1873 Mayor of Alameda, California
- Lionel Wilson, B.A. 1938 – first African American Mayor of Oakland, California

== Diplomats ==
- Julia Chang Bloch, B.A. 1964 – U.S. Ambassador to Nepal (1989–1993)
- Kenneth C. Brill, M.B.A. 1973 – U.S. Ambassador to Cyprus (1996–1999), and to the International Atomic Energy Agency (2001–04)
- Ruth A. Davis, M.S.W. 1968 – U.S. Ambassador to Benin (1992–1995)
- John Kenneth Galbraith, M.A. 1932, Ph.D. 1934 – Harvard Professor Emeritus of Economics; U.S. Ambassador to India
- Jeffrey Ross Gunter, A.B. 1983 – U.S. Ambassador to Iceland (2019–2021)
- Philip Habib, Ph.D. 1952 – U.S. Ambassador to South Korea (1971–74), U.S. Special Envoy to the Middle East (1981–1983)
- Kathryn Walt Hall, B.A. – U.S. Ambassador to Austria (1997–2001)
- March Kong Fong Eu, B.S. 1943 – former California Secretary of State, former U.S. Ambassador to Micronesia, mother of Matt Fong, also a noted Chinese-American politician
- Eleni Kounalakis, M.B.A. – U.S. Ambassador to Hungary (2010–2013), Lieutenant Governor of California (2019–present)
- Michael G. Kozak, B.A. 1968, J.D. 1971 – U.S. Ambassador to Belarus (2000–2003)
- Joseph Limprecht, Ph.D. 1975 – U.S. Ambassador to Albania (1999–2002)
- John K. Menzies, Ph.D. – U.S. Ambassador to Bosnia-Herzegovina (1996–1996), current dean of the Whitehead School of Diplomacy at Seton Hall University
- Richard Monroe Miles, B.A. 1962 – U.S. Ambassador to Bulgaria (1999–2002), and Georgia (2002–2005)
- David Dunlop Newsom, B.A. 1938 – U.S. Ambassador to Indonesia (1974–1977), and the Philippines (1977–1978), Under Secretary of State for Political Affairs (1978–1981)
- Sadako Ogata, Ph.D. 1963 – United Nations High Commissioner for Refugees (1991–2001)
- Maurice S. Parker, B.A. 1972 – U.S. Ambassador to Swaziland (2007–present)
- Gregory L. Schulte, B.A. 1980 – Ambassador to the International Atomic Energy Agency (2005–09)
- Tonika Sealy-Thompson, MA 2019 – Barbadian ambassador to Brazil
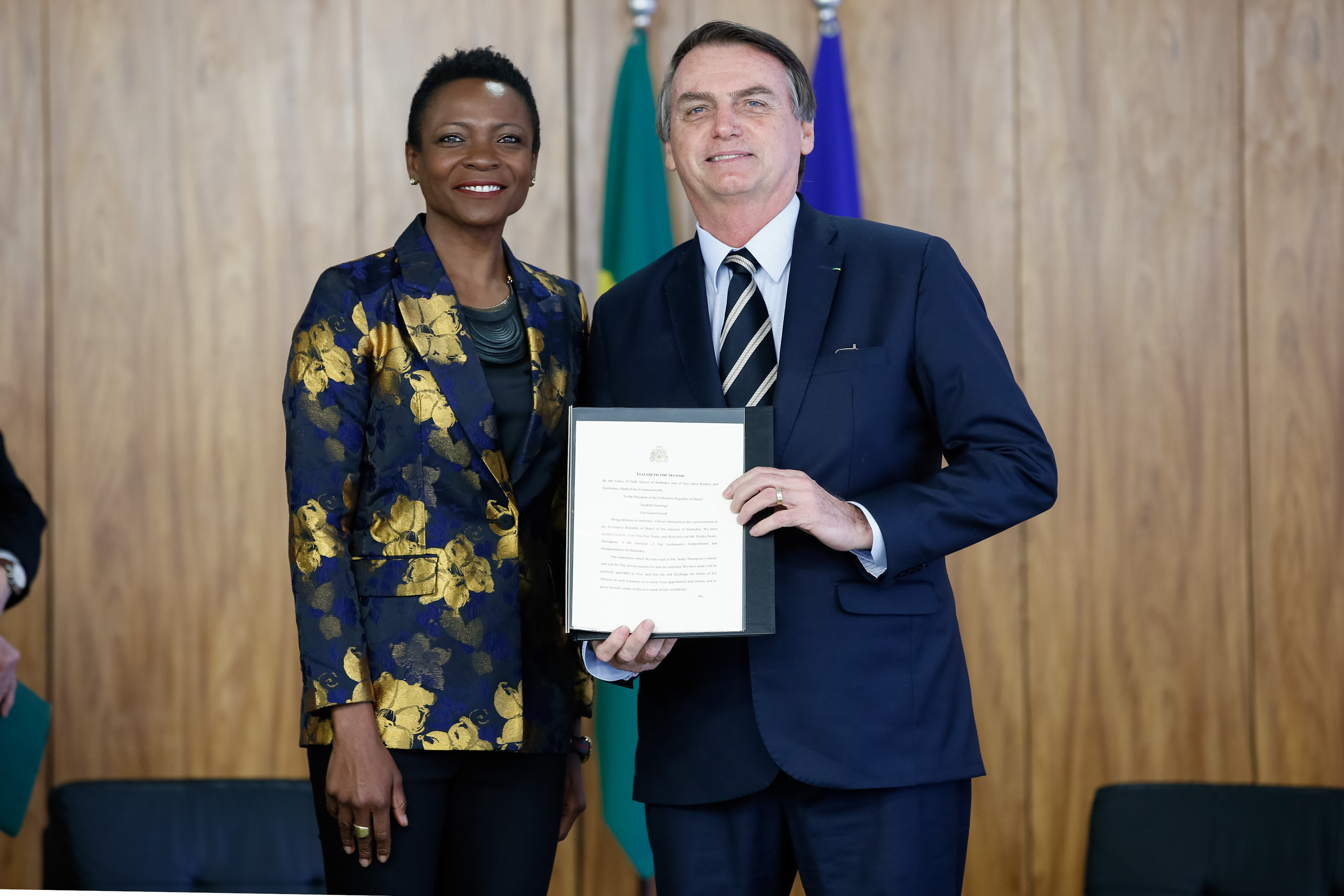
  Tonika Sealy-Thompson appointed Ambassador to Brazil
- J. Christopher Stevens, B.A. 1982, J.D. 1989 – U.S. Ambassador to Libya (2012)
- Kenneth D. Taylor, M.B.A. 1959 – Canadian ambassador to Iran (1977–1979) during the Iranian Hostage Crisis, noted for his role in the Canadian Caper which formed the basis of the Academy Award-winning film Argo
- Earl Anthony Wayne, B.A. 1972 – U.S. Ambassador to Argentina (2007–2015); and Mexico (2011–2015)
- Ibrahim Youssri, Egypitan Ambassador to Algeria (1989–1990s)
- James David Zellerbach, 1913 – U.S. Ambassador to Italy

== Attorneys ==
- Zoe Baird, B.A. 1974, J.D. 1977 – attorney, President of Markle Foundation; nominated by President Clinton for United States Attorney General post
- Melvin Belli, J.D. 1929 – attorney
- Lea Brilmayer, B.A. 1970, J.D. 1976 – Professor of Law at Yale Law School
- Beth Brinkmann, B.A. 1980 – former assistant to the solicitor general of the U.S. (1993–2001) and a partner in the Washington, D.C. office of Morrison & Foerster
- Jerry Brown – California Attorney General (2007–present) (also listed under Governors section)
- Melinda Haag, J.D. 1987 – United States Attorney for the Northern District of California (2010–2016)
- Brooke Jenkins, B.A. – District Attorney of San Francisco (2022–present)
- Bill Lockyer, B.A. 1965 – California Attorney General (1999–2006)
- David M. Louie, J.D. 1970 – Attorney General of Hawaii (2011–2014)
- Edwin Meese III, J.D. 1958 – United States Attorney General (1985–1988)
- Dale Minami, J.D. 1971 – lead litigator for Fred Korematsu's legal team
- Theodore Olson, J.D. 1965 – United States Solicitor General (2001–2004)
- Larry Sonsini, B.A. 1963, J.D. 1966 – chair at leading Silicon Valley law firm Wilson Sonsini Goodrich & Rosati
- Michael Tigar, B.A. 1962, J.D. 1966 – prominent litigator whose clients have included the Chicago Seven and Oklahoma City bombing accomplice Terry Nichols; Research Professor of Law at Washington College of Law, American University
- Earl Warren, B.A. 1912, J.D. 1914 – Attorney General of California, 1939–1943; 1943–1953 (also listed under Governors section and Justices section)

== Military officers ==
- Jerome M. Adams, MPH 2000 – vice admiral, United States Navy
- Rawson Bennett II, MSEE – rear admiral, United States Navy
- William R. Berkman, BA, JD – general, United States Army; Chief, Army Reserve
- Bertram A. Bone, 1917 – brigadier general, United States Marine Corps
- Casey W. Coane, 1968 – rear admiral, United States Navy
- Robert N. Colwell, BS 1938 – rear admiral, United States Navy
- William F. Dean, BA 1922 – major general, United States Army
- Kenneth Crawford Dempster, Class of 1940 – major general, United States Air Force
- Jimmy Doolittle, 1922 – aviator; lieutenant general, United States Army
- Glen Edwards, BS 1941 – captain, United States Air Force; pilot; engineer; namesake of Edwards Air Force Base
- Susan Escallier, BA – brigadier general, United States Army (Judge Advocate General’s Corps.)
- George Fedoroff, BA 1967 – Office of Naval Intelligence Senior Intelligence Officer, Russia
- David Goggins, BS 1989 (nuclear and material science engineering) – rear admiral, United States Navy
- William C. Groeniger III, Class of 1950 – major general, USMCR
- Fletcher Lamkin, MSE – brigadier general, United States Army
- Yancy B. Lindsey, 1986 – vice admiral, United States Navy
- Harry B. Liversedge, Class of 1917 – brigadier general, United States Marine Corps
- Michael I. Neil, LL.B. – brigadier general, United States Marine Corps
- Monte Melkonian, BA 1978 – Armenian commander in the First Nagorno-Karabakh War
- Robert L. Menist, Class of 1964 – major general, United States Army
- Stuart de Jong Menist, Class of 1934 – major general, United States Army
- Ellen M. Pawlikowski, PhD 1981 chemical engineering – general, United States Air Force
- Don T. Riley, MSCE – major general, deputy commanding general, deputy chief of engineers, U.S. Army Corps of Engineers
- Jack A. Rogers, BS chemistry – brigadier general, United States Army
- Murrey L. Royar, 1916 – vice admiral, United States Navy
- Oliver Prince Smith, 1916 – major general, United States Marine Corps
- Orwin C. Talbott, 1936–39 – lieutenant general, United States Army
- Jack Eugene Thomas, MA, PhD – major general, United States Air Force
- Robert Thomas, BS, civil engineering – vice admiral, United States Navy
- Frederick C. Weyand, 1939 – General; 28th Chief of Staff of the Army (1974–1976)
- Kenneth Ray Wheeler, Class of 1939 – vice admiral, United States Navy
- Jasper Welch, PhD 1958 – major general, United States Air Force
- Joseph Williams Jr. – vice admiral, United States Navy
- Arthur Riehl Wilson, BA 1919 – major general, United States Army

== Activists ==
- Howard Adams, PhD 1966 – Canadian Metis political activist, author of Prison of Grass: Canada from a Native Point of View
- Richard Aoki, B.A. 1968, M.S.W. 1970 – co-founder of the Black Panther Party
- Gordon Belcourt – former Executive Director of the Montana-Wyoming Tribal Leaders Council
- Joan Blades, B.A. 1977 – political activist, co-founder of liberal political advocacy group MoveOn.org (also listed in Science and technology section)
- Betty Friedan (attended psychology graduate program) – feminist activist, author of The Feminine Mystique (1963), founder of the National Women's Political Caucus
- George Horse-Capture, B.A. 1974 – Native American activist, museum curator, Plains Indian Museum and the National Museum of the American Indian
- David Horowitz, M.A. 1961 – conservative political activist and commentator, founder of the Center for the Study of Popular Culture
- Keith Kerr – military general and gay rights activist
- Girindra Mukerji, MS 1907/1908 – early Asian American campus organizer, Indian anti-British activist
- James Robertson, 1923 – national chair of the Trotskyist Spartacist League
- R.J. Rushdoony, B.A. 1938, M.A. 1940 – prominent author of the Christian Right
- Kevin Sabet, B.A. 2001 – prominent anti-drug researcher and advocate, founder of Smart Approaches to Marijuana
- Mario Savio (attended) – political activist, key member of Berkeley Free Speech Movement
- Carol E. Schatz, B.A., Los Angeles civic leader
- Eveline Shen, M.P.H. – executive director and board president of West Coast-based reproductive justice nonprofit, Forward Together
- Andy Spahn, B.A. 1978 – progressive political activist, political and philanthropic consultant for DreamWorks SKG

== Other ==
- Damir Arnaut, B.A. 1997, M.A. 1998, J.D. 2002 – Adviser for Legal and Constitutional Affairs to Haris Silajdzic, member of the Presidency of Bosnia and Herzegovina, Bosnia and Herzegovina
- Jesse Arreguin, B.A. 2003 – Berkeley City Councilmember (2008–present)
- Mario Bergara, PhD 1998 – president of the Central Bank of Uruguay (2008–2013), appointed Minister of Economy and Finance
- Bernice Brown, 1928 – First Lady of California, Wife of Governor Pat Brown
- Josh Brown, B.A. 2003 – Kitsap County Commissioner, Washington state
- Peter Brown, M.A. – at-large Houston City Council Member
- Mike Casey, B.A. 1980 – trade union leader
- Rachelle Chong, B.A. 1981 – first Asian American Commissioner of the Federal Communications Commission and first Asian American Commissioner of the California Public Utilities Commission
- Tarak Nath Das, M.A. 1914 – Indian revolutionary, Indian-American scholar and internationalist
- Tony Daysog, B.A. 1989, M.C.P. 1998 – Alameda City Council member (1996–2006) and Alameda Vice Mayor (1998–2000 and 2002–2004)
- William Dudley, PhD 1982 – president and CEO of the Federal Reserve Bank of New York (2009–present)
- Maria Echaveste, J.D. 1980 – White House Deputy Chief of Staff (1998–2001)
- Nadine Burke Harris, B.S. 1996 – first Surgeon General of California
- H. Robert Heller, PhD 1965 – governor of the Federal Reserve System and president of VISA USA
- Ida Louise Jackson, B.A. 1922, M.A. 1923 – education and public-health pioneer
- Ellis O. Knox, B.A. 1922 – civil rights and education activist, first African American PhD (USC) on West Coast, former chairman of NAACP Education Division
- Susan K. Martin, Ph.D. 1983 – executive director National Commission on Libraries and Information Science
- Bruno Mégret, M.S. 1974 – French far-right politician, member of the French National Assembly (1986–1988), member of the European Parliament (1989–1999) and candidate in the 2002 French presidential election
- Kenneth P. Moritsugu, M.P.H. 1975 – Acting Surgeon General of the United States (August 2006 – September 2007)
- Ray Mueller, B.S. 1996 – San Mateo County Supervisor (2023–present), Menlo Park, CA City Councilmember (2012–2022), Menlo Park, CA Mayor (2014, 2019)
- Jayaprakash Narayan (attended M.A. program) – Indian freedom fighter, social reformer, politician
- Richard Neustadt, B.A. 1939 – political historian and advisor to several U.S. presidents
- Troy A. Paredes, B.A. 1992 – Commissioner of the Securities and Exchange Commission
- Kevin Starr, M.L.S. 1974 – California State Librarian Emeritus
- Nicolle Wallace, B.A. 1994 – White House Communications Director for President George W. Bush (2005–2009)

== See also ==
- List of UC Berkeley School of Law alumni
- List of UC Berkeley faculty
