= Hibnick v. Google, Inc. =

- Court: United States District Court for the Northern District of California
- Full case name: Eva Hibnick v. Google Inc. (In re: Google Buzz Privacy Litigation)
- Decided: October 7, 2010
- Docket nos.: 5:10-cv-00672

Court membership
- Judge sitting: James Ware

Hibnick v. Google, Inc. was a class action suit brought by Eva Hibnick, a Harvard Law School graduate, against Google in 2010. The suit accused Google of breaching several electronic communications laws with the launch of their new product Google Buzz. Google Buzz was a social media network that automatically plugged into Gmail.

Hibnick v. Google was filed in the United States District Court, Northern District of California and accused Google of being in breach of the Electronic Communications Privacy Act and the Computer Fraud and Abuse Act. Google Buzz shared private information by revealing Gmail users’ contacts and automatically opted all Gmail users into using Google Buzz.

The lawsuit settled for $8.5 million, 30% of which went to the attorneys.
