= Haywood Gilliam =

American judge (born 1969)

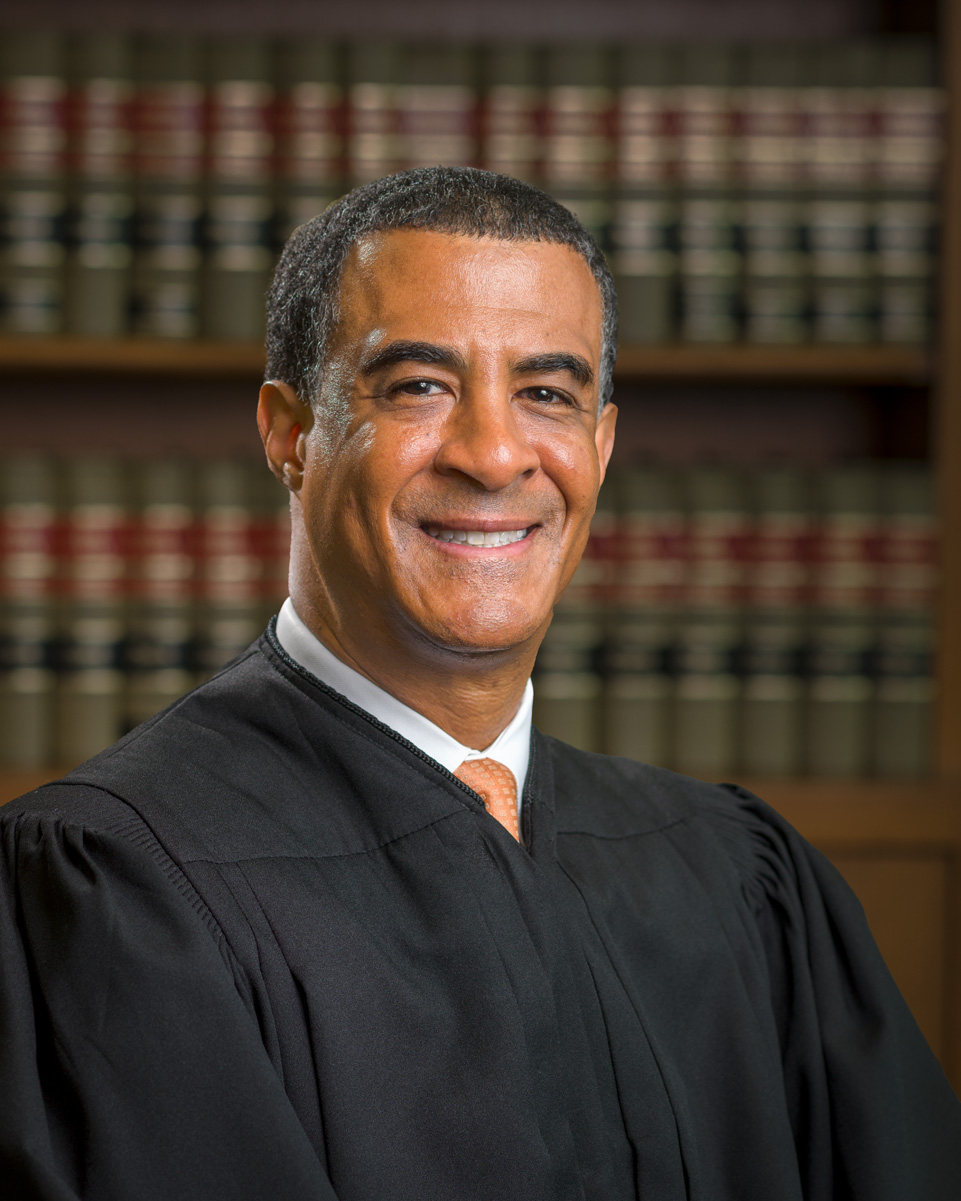

Judge of the United States District Court for the Northern District of California
- Incumbent
- Assumed office December 19, 2014
- Appointed by: Barack Obama
- Preceded by: Claudia Ann Wilken

Personal details
- Born: Haywood Stirling Gilliam Jr. October 13, 1969 (age 56) Marlborough, Massachusetts, U.S.
- Education: Yale University (BA); Stanford University (JD)

Haywood Stirling Gilliam Jr. (born October 13, 1969) is a United States district judge of the United States District Court for the Northern District of California.

== Biography ==
Gilliam was born in 1969, in Marlborough, Massachusetts. He graduated from Yale University in 1991 with a Bachelor of Arts, magna cum laude. He then received a Juris Doctor from Stanford Law School in 1994, where he was an articles editor of the Stanford Law Review.

He served as a law clerk to Judge Thelton Henderson of the United States District Court for the Northern District of California, from 1994 to 1995. He worked at the law firm of McCutchen, Doyle, Brown & Enersen from 1995 to 1998. He served as an assistant United States attorney in the Northern District of California, from 1999 to 2006, serving as Chief of the Securities Fraud Section, from 2004 to 2006. He was a partner at the law firm of Bingham McCutchen, from 2006 to 2009. From 2009 to 2014, he was a partner at Covington & Burling, where he served as the vice-chair of the firm's White Collar Defense and Investigations practice group.

=== Federal judicial service ===
On September 8, 2014, President Barack Obama nominated Gilliam to serve as a United States District Judge of the United States District Court for the Northern District of California, to the seat vacated by Judge Claudia Ann Wilken, who assumed senior status in December 2014. He received a hearing before the United States Senate Committee on the Judiciary on September 17, 2014. On November 20, 2014 his nomination was reported out of committee by voice vote. On December 13, 2014 Senate Majority Leader Harry Reid filed a motion to invoke cloture on the nomination. On December 16, 2014, Reid withdrew his cloture motion on Gilliam Jr.'s nomination, and the Senate proceeded to vote to confirm Gilliam Jr. by a voice vote. He received his judicial commission on December 19, 2014.

=== Border wall ruling ===
On May 24, 2019, Gilliam granted a preliminary injunction preventing the Trump administration from redirecting funds under the national emergency declaration issued earlier in the year to fund a planned wall along the border with Mexico. The injunction applies specifically to some of the money the administration intended to allocate from other agencies, and limits wall construction projects in El Paso, Texas and Yuma, Arizona. A judge on the U.S. District Court for the District of Columbia, Trevor McFadden, issued an opinion a week later in a similar case that disagreed with Judge Gilliam's conclusions on standing. On June 28, 2019, Judge Gilliam granted a permanent injunction. On July 26, 2019, the United States Supreme Court, in the case Trump v. Sierra Club, No. 19A60, in a 5-to-4 ruling, overturned an appellate decision which had refused to stay Judge Gilliam's May 23, 2019, injunction, and said that the administration could spend the money while litigation over the matter proceeds.

== See also ==
- List of African-American federal judges
- List of African-American jurists

Legal offices
Preceded by Claudia Ann Wilken	Judge of the United States District Court for the Northern District of California; 2014–present	Incumbent
