= Spencer Williams (disambiguation) =

Spencer Williams may refer to:

- Spencer Williams (1889–1965), American jazz musician
- Spencer Williams Jr. (1893–1969), African American actor and filmmaker
- Spencer Mortimer Williams (1922–2008), United States federal judge
