= Vaughn Walker =

American judge (born 1944)

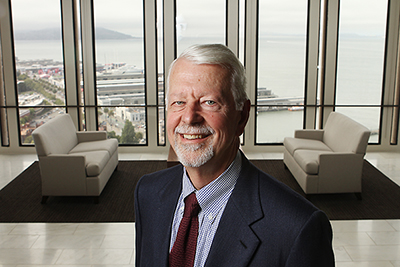

Chief Judge of the United States District Court for the Northern District of California
- In office October 30, 2004 – December 31, 2010
- Preceded by: Marilyn Patel
- Succeeded by: James Ware

Judge of the United States District Court for the Northern District of California
- In office November 27, 1989 – February 28, 2011
- Appointed by: George H. W. Bush
- Preceded by: Spencer Williams
- Succeeded by: Yvonne Rogers

Personal details
- Born: Vaughn Richard Walker; 1944 (age 81–82) Watseka, Illinois, U.S.
- Education: University of Michigan (BA); Stanford University (JD)

Vaughn Richard Walker (born 1944) is an American lawyer who served as a United States district judge of the United States District Court for the Northern District of California from 1989 to 2011. Walker presided over the original trial in Hollingsworth v. Perry, where he found California's Proposition 8 to be unconstitutional.

== Education and career ==
Walker was born in Watseka, Illinois, in 1944. He graduated from the University of Michigan with a Bachelor of Arts degree in 1966 and Stanford Law School with a Juris Doctor in 1970. From 1966 to 1967, he was a Woodrow Wilson Fellow in economics at the University of California, Berkeley. After clerking for United States District Court for the Central District of California Judge Robert J. Kelleher (1971–72), he practiced in San Francisco at Pillsbury, Madison & Sutro.

== Federal judicial service ==
Walker was originally nominated to the bench by President Ronald Reagan in 1987. However, this nomination stalled in the Senate Judiciary Committee because of controversy over his representation of the United States Olympic Committee in a lawsuit that prohibited the use of the title "Gay Olympics". Two dozen House Democrats, led by Representative Nancy Pelosi of San Francisco, opposed his nomination because of his perceived insensitivity to gays and the poor.

On September 7, 1989, Walker was re-nominated by President George H. W. Bush to the seat on the United States District Court for the Northern District of California vacated by Judge Spencer M. Williams. He was confirmed by the United States Senate on November 21, 1989, on unanimous consent and received his commission on November 27, 1989.

On September 29, 2010, Walker announced he would retire at the end of 2010 and return to private practice. He retired at the end of February 2011. On April 6, 2011, Walker told reporters that he is gay and has been in a relationship with a male doctor for about ten years. He was the first known gay person to serve as a United States federal judge, though he did not publicly confirm his sexual orientation until after retiring from the federal bench.

== Post-judicial service ==
Since retiring from the bench, Judge Walker has operated a private practice in San Francisco focusing on arbitration and mediation services, Walker Nakamura ADR LLP, as well as lecturing at Stanford Law School and the University of California, Berkeley, School of Law.

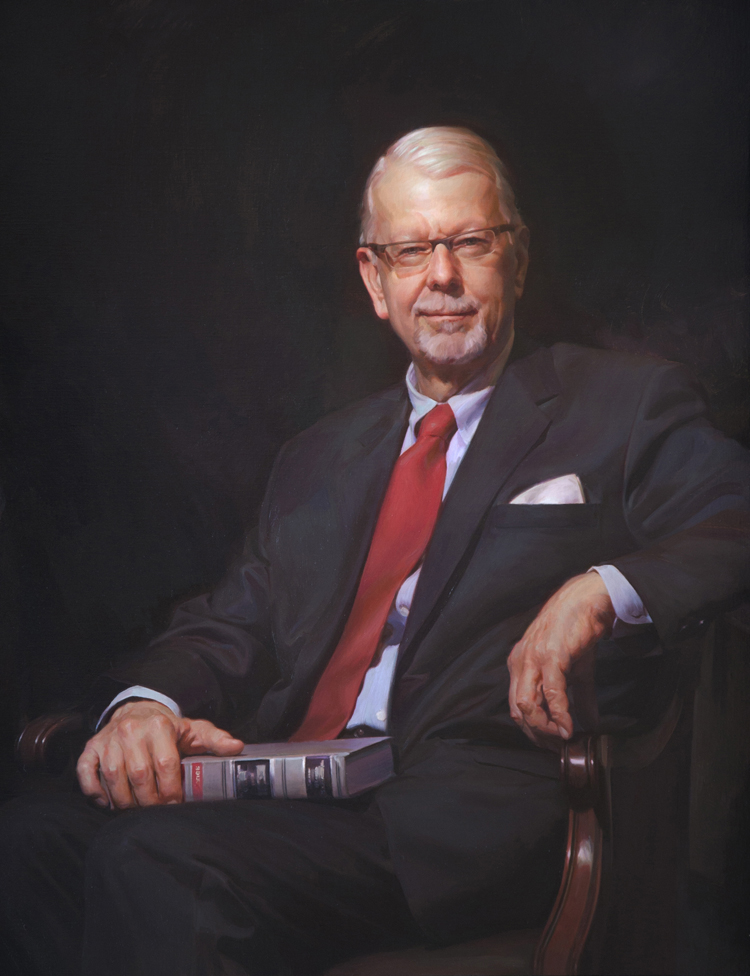
Walker's official portrait

== Views ==
Walker generally believes in a legal approach known as law and economics.

Walker has been called an "unorthodox" and "independent-minded conservative" judge; he has called for policies including the auctioning of lead counsel status in securities class action suits and the legalization of drugs. In a 2003 case, United States v. Gementera, as a condition of supervised release, Walker required a defendant who had pleaded guilty to mail theft to stand in front of a San Francisco post office wearing a sandwich board that read: "I stole mail. This is my punishment." The condition was upheld on appeal.

A San Francisco Chronicle columnist and reporter wrote in a commentary that Walker has an "aversion to harsh sentences for well-educated, well-heeled criminals and, in particular, perpetrators of securities fraud."

The New York Times at the time of his initial Reagan nomination stated he was active in Republican politics; Wired magazine describes Walker as having libertarian leanings.

== Cases ==
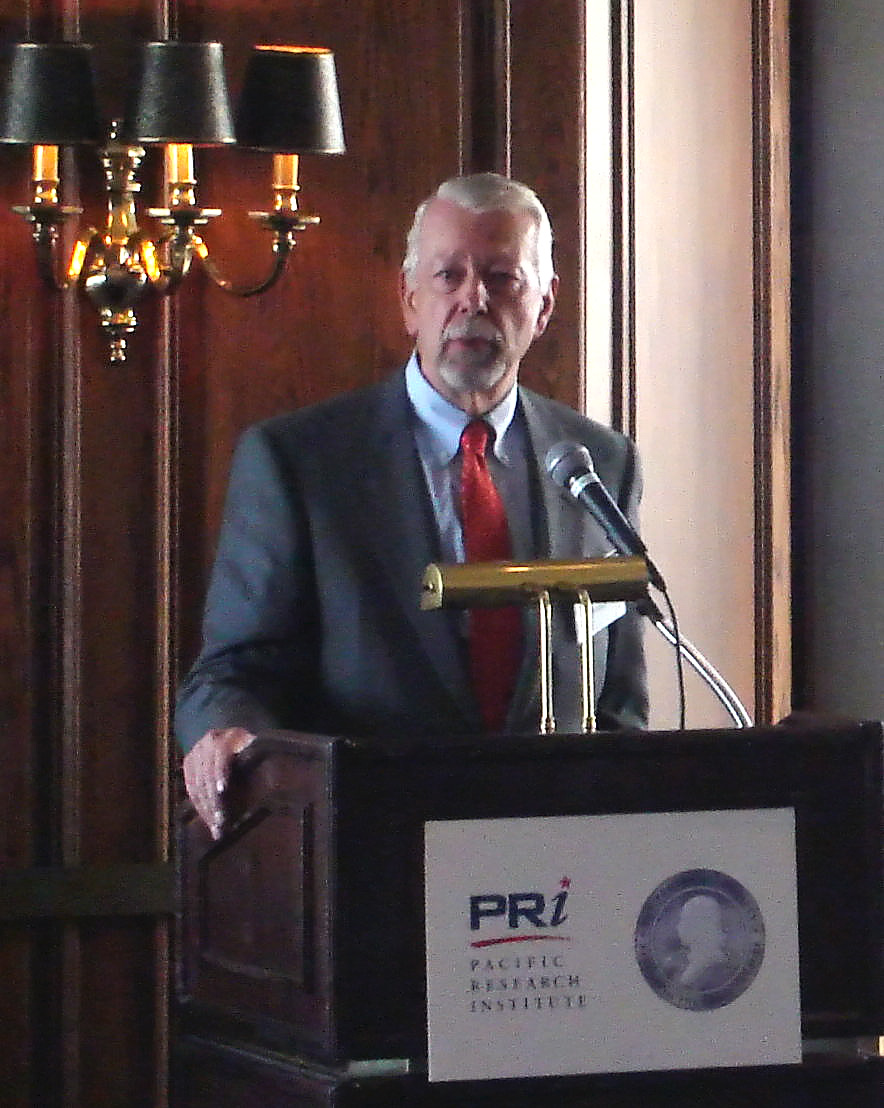
Walker in 2008 speaking to the Pacific Research Institute

Walker has presided over such notable cases as lawsuits over NSA warrantless surveillance; the Apple Computer, Inc. v. Microsoft Corporation copyright infringement case; the breach of TD Ameritrade's customer information database Clint Reilly's antitrust litigation over the Hearst Corporation's purchase of the San Francisco Chronicle; and Oracle's merger/hostile takeover of PeopleSoft, which was approved despite Justice Department opposition.

=== Hollingsworth v. Perry ===
On January 11, 2010, Walker began hearing arguments in Perry v. Brown. The case was a federal-constitutional challenge to California Proposition 8, a voter initiative constitutional amendment that eliminated the right of same-sex couples to marry, a right which had previously been granted after the California Supreme Court found that Proposition 22 was unconstitutional. On August 4, 2010, Walker ruled that Proposition 8 was unconstitutional "under both the Due Process and Equal Protection Clauses" and prohibited its enforcement.

On April 25, 2011, supporters of Proposition 8 filed a motion in district court to vacate Walker's decision, citing Walker's own post-trial statement that he has been in a long-term relationship with another man. They argued he should have recused himself or disclosed his relationship status, and unless Walker "disavowed any interest in marrying his partner", he had "a direct personal interest in the outcome of the case." (Note: Previously, the general counsel for the campaign had denied any intention to raise the issue.) District Court Judge James Ware heard arguments on the motion on June 13 and denied it the next day, writing that "the presumption that Judge Walker, by virtue of being in a same-sex relationship, had a desire to be married that rendered him incapable of making an impartial decision, is as warrantless as the presumption that a female judge is incapable of being impartial in a case in which women seek legal relief." Legal experts noted that similar efforts to remove Hispanic judges from immigration cases or female judges from gender-discrimination cases have also failed in the past.

The Supreme Court of the United States's 2013 decision in Hollingsworth v. Perry left Walker's 2010 ruling as the final decision on Proposition 8.

The proceedings were reenacted in the stage play 8, in which Walker was portrayed by Brad Pitt and Bob Balaban.

== See also ==
- List of LGBT jurists in the United States

== Notes ==
Legal offices
| Preceded by Spencer Williams | Judge of the United States District Court for the Northern District of California; 1989–2011 | Succeeded by Yvonne Rogers |
| Preceded by Marilyn Patel | Chief Judge of the United States District Court for the Northern District of California; 2004–2010 | Succeeded by James Ware |
