= Saundra Brown Armstrong =

American judge (born 1947)

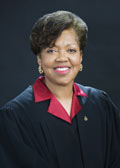

Senior Judge of the United States District Court for the Northern District of California
- Incumbent
- Assumed office March 23, 2012

Judge of the United States District Court for the Northern District of California
- In office June 18, 1991 – March 23, 2012
- Appointed by: George H. W. Bush
- Preceded by: William Austin Ingram
- Succeeded by: Jon S. Tigar

Personal details
- Born: March 23, 1947 (age 79) Oakland, California, U.S.
- Education: Merritt College (AA); California State University, Fresno (BA); University of San Francisco (JD); Pacific School of Religion (MDiv)

Saundra Brown Armstrong (born March 23, 1947) is a senior United States district judge of the United States District Court for the Northern District of California.

== Education and career ==
Born in Oakland, California, Armstrong received an Associate of Arts degree from Merritt College in 1967 and a Bachelor of Arts degree from California State University, Fresno in 1969. She was the first black policewoman in the Oakland Police Department where she served from 1970 to 1977. She then received a Juris Doctor from the University of San Francisco School of Law in 1977. She was a judicial extern, California Court of Appeals in 1977, and was a deputy district attorney in Alameda County, California from 1978 to 1979 and from 1980 to 1982. From 1979 to 1980, she was a senior consultant to the California Assembly Committee on Criminal Justice. She was a trial attorney of Public Integrity Section of the United States Department of Justice from 1982 to 1983, and then served as a Commissioner on the Consumer Product Safety Commission from 1983 to 1986, and on the United States Parole Commission from 1986 to 1989. She was a Judge on the Alameda Superior Court, California from 1989 to 1991.

== Federal judicial service ==
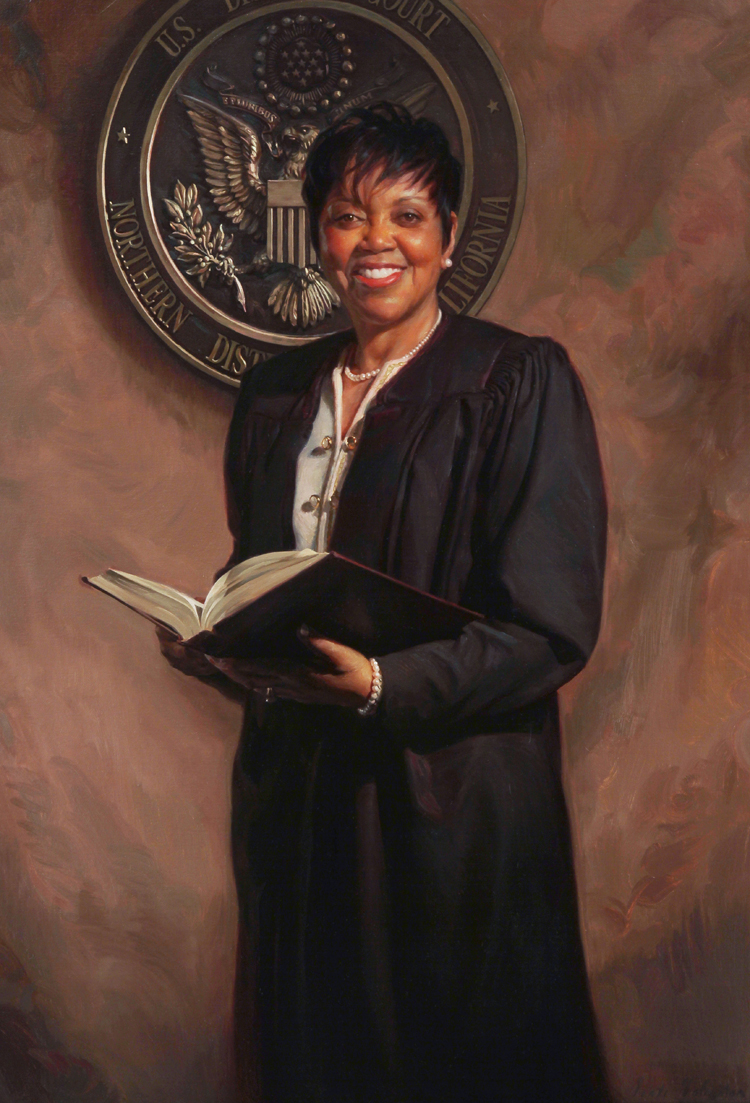
Judge Saundra Brown Armstrong's official portrait for the U.S. District Court was painted by Scott Wallace Johnston

On April 25, 1991, Armstrong was nominated by President George H. W. Bush to a seat on the United States District Court for the Northern District of California vacated by William Austin Ingram. She was confirmed by the United States Senate on June 14, 1991, and received her commission on June 18, 1991, becoming the first Black woman judge of the Northern District of California. She earned a Master of Divinity (M.Div.) from the Pacific School of Religion in 2012 and she assumed senior status on March 23, 2012.

== See also ==
- List of African-American federal judges
- List of African-American jurists
- List of first women lawyers and judges in California

== Sources ==
Legal offices
Preceded by William Austin Ingram	Judge of the United States District Court for the Northern District of California; 1991–2012	Succeeded by Jon S. Tigar
