= Larry P. v. Riles =

1979 court case

- Court: United States District Court for the Northern District of California
- Full case name: LARRY P., by his Guardian ad litem, LUCILLE P., et al. v. Wilson RILES, Superintendent of Public Instruction for the State of California, et al.
- Argued: October 11, 1977
- Started: November 23, 1971
- Decided: October 16, 1979
- Citation: 495 F.Supp. 926.

Court membership
- Judge sitting: Robert Francis Peckham

Larry P. v. Riles is a California court case in which the court held that IQ tests could not be used to place African-American students in special education classes.

Five African-American children had been placed in special classes for the "educable mentally retarded", based on low IQ test scores. Judge Robert F. Peckham ruled that they had been wrongly placed.

== Background ==
The case was filed by the National Association for the Advancement of Colored People (NAACP) Legal Defense fund. "Larry P." was one of the children, real name Darryl Lester. Wilson Riles was the California State Superintendent of Public Instruction.

== District court ruling ==
The case was initially filed in 1971, as a class-action on behalf of six African-American students in the San Francisco School District. On June 20, 1972, a preliminary injunction was issued forbidding the use of IQ tests by the San Francisco School District to place African-American students in special education. The injunction was upheld on appeal in 1974.

A trial on the merits was delayed because of the implementation of the 1974 master plan, but the case eventually proceeded to trial in October 1977.

The final ruling was issued by United States District Court for the Northern District of California in 1979.

== Appeals court ==
Larry P. v. Riles
- Court: United States Court of Appeals for the Ninth Circuit
- Full case name: LARRY P., by his Guardian ad litem, LUCILLE P.; M.S., by his Guardian ad litem, Joyce S.; M.J., by his Guardian ad litem, Mary H.; Sylvia M., by her Guardian at litem, Sylvia W.; J.L., by his Guardian ad litem, Selena F., Plaintiffs-Appellees, v. Wilson RILES, Superintendent of Public Instruction for the State of California, Defendant-Appellant, Henry P. Gunderson, et al., Defendants.
- Argued: November 12, 1981
- Decided: January 23, 1984
- Citation: 793 F.2d 969.

Case history
- Prior action: 495 F.Supp. 926.

Court membership
- Judges sitting: Otto Richard Skopil Jr., Cecil F. Poole, William Benner Enright

The primary ruling was upheld on appeal to the 9th circuit in 1984.

The appeals court, in 1984, further banned the use of IQ tests on African-American children.

== Later interpretations ==
The case has been described as "arguably the most well-known legal decision related to cognitive assessment".

In a later case, Crawford v. Honig, African-American children were permitted to take IQ tests if their parents permitted it.

After Crawford v. Honig, the California Department of Education issued memoranda in 1992 and 1997 stating that the prohibition on IQ tests for African-American students would still be followed.
