= Robert Francis Peckham =

American judge (1920-1993)

Senior Judge of the United States District Court for the Northern District of California
- In office November 11, 1988 – February 16, 1993

Chief Judge of the United States District Court for the Northern District of California
- In office 1976–1988
- Preceded by: Oliver Jesse Carter
- Succeeded by: William Austin Ingram

Judge of the United States District Court for the Northern District of California
- In office November 3, 1966 – November 11, 1988
- Appointed by: Lyndon B. Johnson
- Preceded by: Seat established by 80 Stat. 75
- Succeeded by: James Ware

Personal details
- Born: Robert Francis Peckham; November 3, 1920 San Francisco, California
- Died: February 16, 1993 (aged 72) San Francisco, California
- Education: Stanford University (A.B.); Stanford Law School (LL.B.)

Robert Francis Peckham (November 3, 1920 – February 16, 1993) was a United States district judge of the United States District Court for the Northern District of California.

== Education and career ==
Born in San Francisco, California, Peckham attended Yale University and received an Artium Baccalaureus degree from Stanford University in 1941 and a Bachelor of Laws from Stanford Law School in 1945. He was in private practice in Palo Alto and Sunnyvale, California from 1946 to 1948. He was an Assistant United States Attorney of the Northern District of California from 1948 to 1953. He was the Chief Assistant of the Criminal Division from 1952 to 1953. He was again in private practice in Palo Alto and Sunnyvale from 1953 to 1959. He was a judge of the Superior Court of Santa Clara County, California from 1959 to 1966. He was Presiding Judge of that court from 1961 to 1963 and from 1965 to 1966.

== Federal judicial service ==
Peckham was nominated by President Lyndon B. Johnson on September 9, 1966, to the United States District Court for the Northern District of California, to a new seat created by 80 Stat. 75. He was confirmed by the United States Senate on October 20, 1966, and received his commission on November 3, 1966. He served as Chief Judge from 1976 to 1988. He assumed senior status on November 11, 1988. Peckham served in that capacity until his death on February 16, 1993, in San Francisco.

=== Notable cases ===
Peckham was the presiding judge for a lawsuit filed by minorities and women that charged the San Francisco Police Department with discrimination in hiring. In ruling in favor of the plaintiffs in 1979, he ordered the department to hire 50 percent minority applicants and 20 percent women for the next 10 years. He extended the order a decade later after expressing "disappointment and sadness" at the department's progress. He also issued an order in 1985 setting ground rules for the desegregation of the San Jose Unified School District.

In a suit by a group of black parents against the California school system, Larry P. v. Riles, he ruled in 1979 that I.Q. tests had a built-in bias against blacks. He prohibited their use statewide because he said they improperly classified some blacks as "retarded". He broadened this order in 1986 to forbid use of the tests to identify blacks as being "learning disabled" or to assess their learning disabilities. He withdrew the 1986 order in September 1992 after another group of black parents sued to allow their children to be given I.Q. tests to evaluate learning disabilities. He said further hearings were needed to decide whether a renewed ban was required to keep blacks from being misplaced in classes for the learning disabled.

In 1985, Peckham issued an order for the desegregation of the San Jose Unified School District.

He also presided over the federal criminal prosecution of Larry Layton, a former member of the People's Temple cult, who was convicted of aiding and abetting in the murder of United States Representative Leo Ryan at a jungle airstrip in Guyana in November 1978. Hours after Mr. Ryan and four others were shot to death at an airstrip near Jonestown, which was the headquarters of the cult, the cult's leader, the Jim Jones, and 912 of his followers died by poison and gunfire in mass killings and suicides. Peckham sentenced Layton to life in prison, as well as to three concurrent terms of 15 years each in related charges.

== Honor ==
In 1990, the Robert F. Peckham Federal Building Courthouse in San Jose, California was named in Peckham's honor.

== External sources ==
- "The honorable Robert F. Peckham, 1920-1993 : oral history transcripts : his legal, political, and judicial life" (1995), Regional Oral History Office University of California, The Bancroft Library Berkeley, California, Northern California U.S. District Court Oral History Series

Legal offices
Preceded by Seat established by 80 Stat. 75	Judge of the United States District Court for the Northern District of California; 1966–1988	Succeeded by James Ware
Preceded by Oliver Jesse Carter	Chief Judge of the United States District Court for the Northern District of California; 1976–1988	Succeeded by William Austin Ingram
