= Girindra Mukerji =

Indian anti-British activist (born 1879/80)

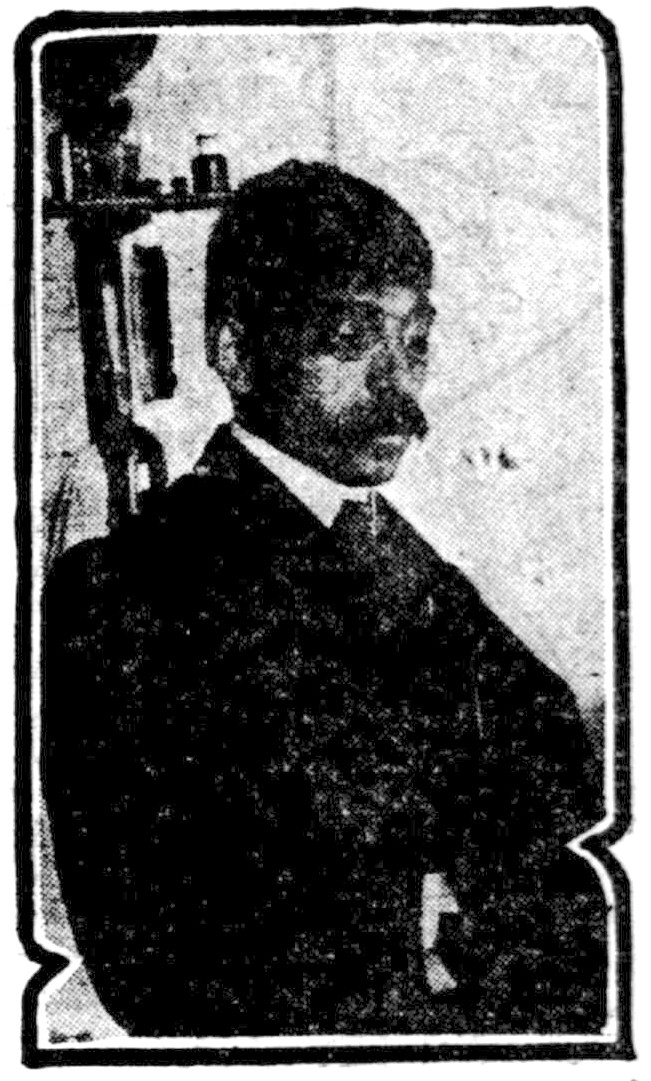
- Born: 1879 or 1880; Calcutta, Bengal Presidency, British India (present-day Kolkata, West Bengal, India)
- Education: Calcutta University; Tokyo Imperial University; University of California, Berkeley
- Employer: Bengal National College
- Notable work: The Hindu in America

Girindra Mukerji (born 1879 or 1880) was an Indian anti-British activist, organizer, and agriculturist. His article "The Hindu in America" has been widely cited as a document describing early Indian immigration to the United States.

== Early life ==
Mukerji was born in Calcutta, India in 1879 or 1880. He was, according to the San Francisco Chronicle, the son of a "Judge of one of the higher courts."

In 1901, he received an AB degree from Calcutta University, then briefly studied in Japan, at the Imperial University in Tokyo, before deciding to study in the United States.

== Life in the United States ==
Mukerji moved to the United States in 1904, becoming a student at Oregon Agricultural College. While in Oregon, according to Gopal Stavig, he represented the Vedanta Society at the Lewis and Clark Exposition in Portland in summer 1905.

He moved to Berkeley, California in April 1904, hoping to study at the University of California, Berkeley; he started working to fund his education, and was a student by 1905.

Mukerji was a student leader among Indian students at UC Berkeley, described in the media as "having charge of the colony." His time at UC Berkeley was widely covered by American newspapers.

== Student activism ==
Around 1906, according to British surveillance, Mukerji and Tarak Nath Das worked together as "agitators against British rule." Subsequently, wrote William C. Hopkinson, "Mookerjee and Dass then got together some five or six other students and formed a society called the Samiti, which is considered the most secret among all the societies with Hindu affiliations." The local media would subsequently describe him as a socialist.

In 1907, Mukerji co-founded the Association of Oriental Students at UC Berkeley, the first Asian American organization at the university, with members from India, Japan, China, and Thailand. He served as the organization's president during at least 1907–1908. While a student, Mukerji also worked as a United States immigration officer from March 1907 to March 1908, interviewing immigrants from India and learning about their labor conditions. He also helped mediate between working class South Asians and the police in the San Francisco Bay Area.

In November 1907, he published a booklet on American colleges focused on an Indian audience; the release was covered in newspapers like the San Francisco Chronicle. British surveillance reported that his pamphlets were "circulated...widely through India, Japan, China, and other parts where there were Hindu students..." A subsequent article, "The Hindu in America," was published in the Overland Monthly in April 1908, and he was interviewed on "The Condition of Hindu Students in America" in The Modern Review in 1909.

In December 1907, Mukerji gave a scathing lecture on the British empire in India to UC Berkeley's Economics Club, which was covered in the San Francisco Chronicle, in an article titled "Hindu Arraigns Britons for the Ruin of India: Calcutta Graduate Scores England for Overtaxing of His People."

In January 1908, after his graduation, he led a student protest against J. Lovell Murray, a Christian evangelist who was in Berkeley to give a talk titled "Awakening the Orient" organized by the local Y.M.C.A. Just before Murray was about to enter Stiles Hall to give his lecture, 16 Indian students at UC Berkeley, including Mukerji, asked Murray to remove from his talk any references to the immorality of Hindu priests, and its use in the justification of the occupation of India by the British. Murray refused. Once Murray was finished speaking, Mukerji was invited to respond to the speaker. He spoke against the British occupation, followed by six other students from the group, until the organizers decided to shut down the event.

== Agricultural research ==
Mukerji was a student of Professor Eugene W. Hilgard, an expert on agricultural chemistry. In 1907–1908, he received a Master of Science from the College of Agriculture at UC Berkeley; his thesis was entitled "A Comparative Study of Soil Columns in the San Joaquin Valley."

University President Benjamin Ide Wheeler, who was present at his farewell, spoke highly of his work and cited him as a role model for other Indians. He hoped to be able to apply his learnings, including Utah dry farming techniques, in India.

== Leaving California, and return to India ==
In 1907, the Berkeley Daily Gazette and San Francisco Examiner reported that Mukerji was to take the chair of agriculture at Calcutta University.

Mukerji left for New York City in March 1908, where he was associated with the Society for the Advancement of India, supporting Indian students. He worked with Myron Phelps, a supporter of Indian freedom; a London Daily Express article critical of the Indian freedom movement described Mukerji as a "clever Hindu agitator" and Phelps' "major-domo." By 1909, he was living in Massachusetts, developing ideas to create a new library in India. He would later stay at Sister Nivedita's apartment in London.

Sarangadhar Das wrote that after graduating from UC Berkeley in 1908, Mukerji "worked as the Superindending (sic) Chemist in a sugar factory in Porto Rico, Cuba, and now is employed in the Bengal National College."

British surveillance records from 1911 placed Mukerji in the "mills of Cawnpore, United Provinces," where he was "still carrying on, although quite secretly, his agitation against Britain," while remaining in correspondence with students at UC Berkeley.

In 1914, the Hindusthanee Student reported that he was "prospecting in the Central Provinces."

== Published works ==
- "Comparison of Soils in Arid and Humid Climates" (1907)
- "The Hindu in America" (Overland Monthly, April 1908)

== See also ==
- Tarak Nath Das
- Ram Nath Puri
- Sarangadhar Das
