= William Austin Ingram =

American judge (1924–2002)

Senior Judge of the United States District Court for the Northern District of California
- In office November 15, 1990 – May 26, 2002

Chief Judge of the United States District Court for the Northern District of California
- In office 1988–1990
- Preceded by: Robert Francis Peckham
- Succeeded by: Thelton Henderson

Judge of the United States District Court for the Northern District of California
- In office July 23, 1976 – November 15, 1990
- Appointed by: Gerald Ford
- Preceded by: Alfonso Zirpoli
- Succeeded by: Saundra Brown Armstrong

Personal details
- Born: William Austin Ingram; July 6, 1924 Jeffersonville, Indiana
- Died: May 26, 2002 (aged 77) Menlo Park, California
- Education: University of Louisville School of Law (LL.B.)

William Austin Ingram (July 6, 1924 – May 26, 2002) was a United States district judge of the United States District Court for the Northern District of California.

== Education and career ==
Born in Jeffersonville, Indiana, Ingram served in the United States Marine Corps Reserve during World War II, from 1943 to 1946. He received a Bachelor of Laws from the University of Louisville School of Law in 1950, and was in private practice in San Francisco, California from 1951 to 1955, and in San Jose, California from 1955 to 1969. He was a deputy district attorney of Santa Clara County, California from 1955 to 1957. He served as a judge of the Municipal Court for the Mountain View Judicial District in Palo Alto, California from 1969 to 1971. In 1971, Ingram was appointed to the Superior Court bench in Santa Clara County by California Governor Ronald Reagan. He served there until 1976.

== Federal judicial service ==
On June 2, 1976, Ingram was nominated by President Gerald Ford to a seat on the United States District Court for the Northern District of California vacated by Judge Alfonso Zirpoli. Ingram was confirmed by the United States Senate on July 23, 1976, and received his commission the same day. He served as Chief Judge from 1988 to 1990, assuming senior status on November 15, 1990. Ingram served in that capacity until his death on May 26, 2002, in Menlo Park, California.

== Sources ==
- The Honorable William Ingram

Legal offices
Preceded by Alfonso Zirpoli	Judge of the United States District Court for the Northern District of California; 1976–1990	Succeeded by Saundra Brown Armstrong
Preceded by Robert Francis Peckham	Chief Judge of the United States District Court for the Northern District of California; 1988–1990	Succeeded by Thelton Henderson
