= James Ware (judge) =

American judge (born 1946)

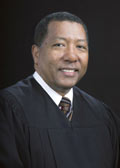

Chief Judge of the United States District Court for the Northern District of California
- In office December 31, 2010 – August 31, 2012
- Preceded by: Vaughn Walker
- Succeeded by: Claudia Ann Wilken

Judge of the United States District Court for the Northern District of California
- In office October 1, 1990 – August 31, 2012
- Appointed by: George H. W. Bush
- Preceded by: Robert Francis Peckham
- Succeeded by: James Donato

Personal details
- Born: William James Ware; November 2, 1946 (age 79) Birmingham, Alabama, U.S.
- Education: California Lutheran University (BA); Stanford University (JD)

William James Ware (born November 2, 1946) is a retired United States district judge of the United States District Court for the Northern District of California.

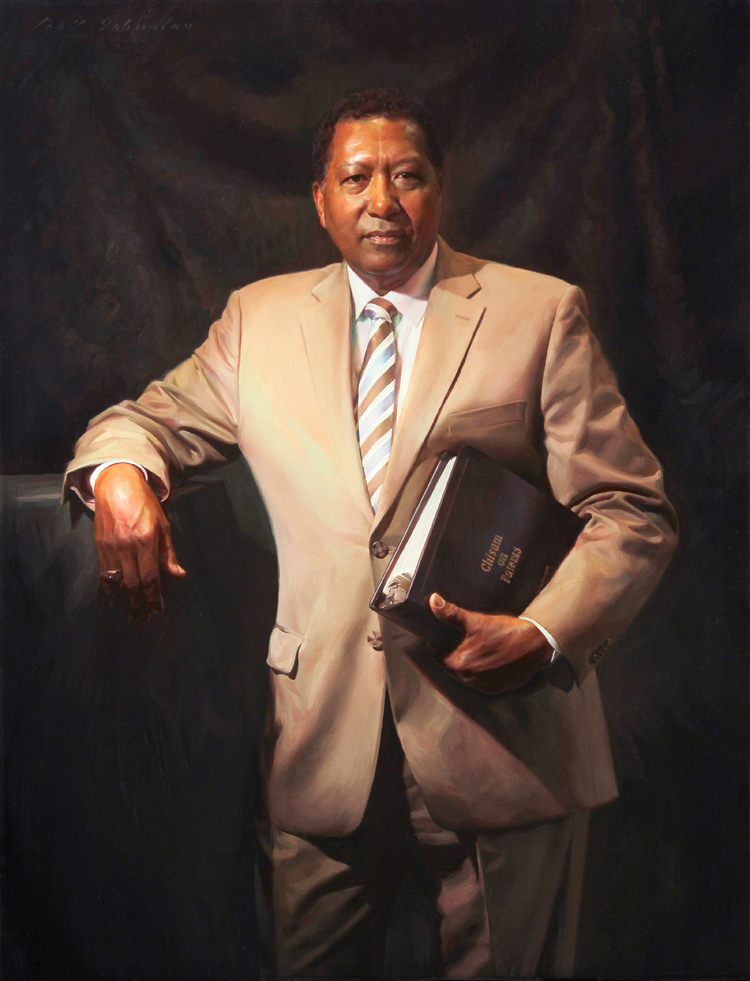
Judge James Ware's official portrait for the U.S. District Court was painted by Scott Johnston

== Early life and education ==
Born in Birmingham, Alabama, Ware received a Bachelor of Arts degree in 1969 from California Lutheran University and a Juris Doctor from Stanford Law School in 1972. Ware was a United States Army Reserve Second Lieutenant in 1972 and also served in the United States Army as a Military Police Officer in 1973. Ware also served as a United States Army Reserve Captain in the Military Police from 1973 to 1986 after graduating from Stanford Law School.

== Career ==
From 1972 until 1988, Ware worked as an attorney in private practice in Palo Alto, California. From 1988 to 1990, Ware was a judge on the Santa Clara County Superior Court. Ware previously taught Civil Procedure at Lincoln Law School of San Jose and Santa Clara University School of Law, and currently works in arbitration and mediation at JAMS in Northern California.

=== Federal judicial service ===
Ware was nominated by President George H. W. Bush on August 3, 1990, to a seat on the United States District Court for the Northern District of California vacated by Judge Robert Francis Peckham. He was confirmed by the United States Senate on September 28, 1990, and received commission on October 1, 1990. He served as Chief Judge from 2010 to 2012. His service terminated on August 31, 2012, due to retirement.

=== Failed nomination to the Ninth Circuit ===
On June 27, 1997, President Bill Clinton nominated Ware to a seat on the United States Court of Appeals for the Ninth Circuit, to replace J. Clifford Wallace, who had taken senior status. Ware had a hearing before the United States Senate Judiciary Committee in October 1997.

However, Ware's nomination unraveled amid an embarrassing scandal that ultimately resulted in him being judicially reprimanded leading Clinton to withdraw his nomination of Ware on November 27, 1997. In 1998, Judge Ware was reprimanded by the Judicial Council of the Northern District Court of California for fabricating the story of being the brother of Virgil Ware, a 13-year-old black boy shot by white teenagers in Alabama in 1963 on the same day as the 16th Street Baptist Church bombing. According to a story Judge Ware had told many audiences, he was riding his bike with his brother Virgil on the handlebars when Virgil was shot and killed by white racists. The incident was a real one, however it happened to a different James Ware, as was discovered when Judge Ware's claim was published in the Alabama papers after he was nominated to the Ninth Circuit by President Bill Clinton. The father of the long-ago slain boy contacted the Alabama courts to report that the California judge was impersonating his own son James Ware who was an employee in a Birmingham power plant. The Alabama courts contacted the California courts, who convened the ethics hearing. Judge Ware was reprimanded but allowed to retain his lifetime appointment as district judge.

=== Notable cases ===
Ware is known for hearing a number of Internet business-related cases such as the sex.com ownership case and RealNetworks vs. Microsoft suit despite "[having] little in the way of high-tech training or experience to make him particularly well suited to preside over these influential cases". In 2006, he heard the Google search terms suit. He ruled that search engine company Google.com must turn over bulk data related to searches, in response to a government order designed to bolster support for an anti-pornography law that has already been ruled unconstitutional. In September 2009, in Rocky Mountain Bank v. Google Inc., he ruled that Google must provide the identity and contact information for a Gmail user that was mistakenly sent confidential information by the Rocky Mountain Bank. He also ordered Google to deactivate the Gmail account.

In 2001, Ware sentenced hacker Max Butler to 18 months in prison for infiltrating United States Department of Defense computers.

On November 9, 2009, the Ninth Circuit Court of Appeals issued a writ of mandamus against Judge Ware in Cohen v. United States District Court, which found that Ware's decision to appoint lead counsel for the plaintiff in a securities fraud case was "clear error" that amounted to "usurpation of power".

On June 14, 2011, Ware ruled that former Chief Judge Vaughn Walker did not have to recuse himself before he declared Proposition 8 unconstitutional. Opponents of same-sex marriage rights had argued that Walker could not make an impartial decision about a law removing the right of same-sex couples to marry because he was gay, and that he must publicly state that he did not wish to marry his partner of ten years. Ware cited previous cases where challenges against female or minority judges were declined, writing, "The presumption that Judge Walker, by virtue of being in a same-sex relationship, had a desire to be married that rendered him incapable of making an impartial decision, is as warrantless as the presumption that a female judge is incapable of being impartial in a case in which women seek legal relief."

On November 13, 2011, Ware made a decision to throw out a lawsuit by the parents of Daniel Galli, Austin Carvalho, Matt Dariano and Dominic Maciel against the Morgan Hill Unified School District. The lawsuit was over an incident on May 5, 2010, where the students came to school at Live Oak High School wearing shirts with American flags. The school sent these students home for fear of inciting violence against the Mexican-American portion of the school body. The lawsuit claimed that "their right to free expression had been violated. They added that there had been discrimination as students wearing Mexican flag colours were not censored." Ware dismissed the lawsuit on the basis that while the Supreme Court has ruled that public school students have the right to engage in non-disruptive free speech, that ruling ‘does not require that school officials wait until disruption occurs before they act’.

== See also ==
- List of African-American federal judges
- List of African-American jurists

Legal offices
| Preceded by Robert Francis Peckham | Judge of the United States District Court for the Northern District of California; 1990–2012 | Succeeded by James Donato |
| Preceded by Vaughn Walker | Chief Judge of the United States District Court for the Northern District of California; 2010–2012 | Succeeded by Claudia Ann Wilken |
