= Ram Nath Puri =

- Born: 21 September 1881; British India
- Died: 1974; Los Angeles, California, United States
- Known for: Editor of Indian revolutionary magazine Circular-i-Azadi

Ram Nath Puri (or Ramnath Puri) was an Indian-American freedom fighter best known as the editor of Circular-i-Azadi, a publication critical of the British Raj, often linked to the early history of the Ghadar Party.

== Early life ==
Puri was born to a Punjabi family on 21 September 1881. His father was Jawala Mul Puri from the village of Khem Karan, in what was then the Lahore District of British India.

He started his career as a bank clerk in Lahore, when he published two anti-colonial pamphlets and a political cartoon of an emaciated "Father India" bound in chains. He attracted the attention of British authorities for having published what they termed "objectionable pamphlets" and a "seditious cartoon." The British confiscated Puri's pamphlets, arrested his agent, and harassed him directly. He decided to leave India.

In late 1906, he migrated to the United States, as a political exile, according to historian Bipan Chandra.

== Activism in the United States ==
In 1907, he founded the Hindustan Association. According to his own description in Circular-i-Azadi, the association was based in San Francisco, California, and had branches in Astoria, Oregon and Vancouver, British Columbia. Lalkar describes "the principal condition for membership of the HA was that the members would rid themselves of prejudice based on caste, colour and creed."

Between 1907 and 1908, he launched and published three issues of Circular-i-Azadi (also transliterated as Circular-e-Azadi), an Urdu language paper critical of British rule in India and focused on political education, published out of San Francisco and Oakland, California. The first issue was printed using lithography.

Historian Maia Ramnath described Circular-i-Azadi as "one of the first significant pieces of anticolonial propaganda circulated on the West Coast." It included original writing, as well as extracts from other publications, including the Gaelic American, and according to Ramnath, most likely the Indian Sociologist and Bande Mataram. Chandra describes Puri as pledging support to the Swadeshi movement in the publication; Ramnath quotes a 1908 issue that reads, in part, "The king is no longer to us the representative of God in the country. We have come to know that people possess the right of appointing and dethroning kings...Swadeshi is for Indians what Sinn Fein is for Ireland."

Circular-i-Azadi came to the attention of the British Director of Criminal Intelligence, and was prohibited from shipment to India due to its allegedly "seditious" content. In January 1908, a Director of Criminal Intelligence report described the report, which had appeared in India, as having as "frankly revolutionary," working "to organise an Indian national party among Indians who go to America for employment," and "capable of working a great mischief."

== Life in the United States ==
In the United States, Ramnath Puri worked as a hospital watchman, interpreter, mining college student, fruit picker, waiter, entrepreneur, and postal worker.

According to Karen Leonard, Puri "returned for his wife in 1906 and brought her to San Francisco, where he had become a U.S. citizen...the three Puri children were born in the first two decades of the century."

In 1908, the Overland Monthly described Puri as a student of English.

In 1910, he acquired land in Oakland, California.

As of 1917, he was described as a naturalized United States citizen, an alumnus of the University of California, a well-known author, and a San Francisco area resident of ten years.

In 1917, he launched a new publication called Rafiq-i-Hind (or "Friend of India") from Stockton, California, with news of interest to the "Hindu" (Indian) community.

In 1947, he published How to Conquer Poverty & Famine in India by American Methods. In it, he describes his choice to leave the United States, and his Californian family, including a son "who is engaged in a business of his own, and a daughter "who is in the Civil Service of the California State Government."

He died in Los Angeles, California in 1974.
