= James Donato =

American federal judge (born 1960)

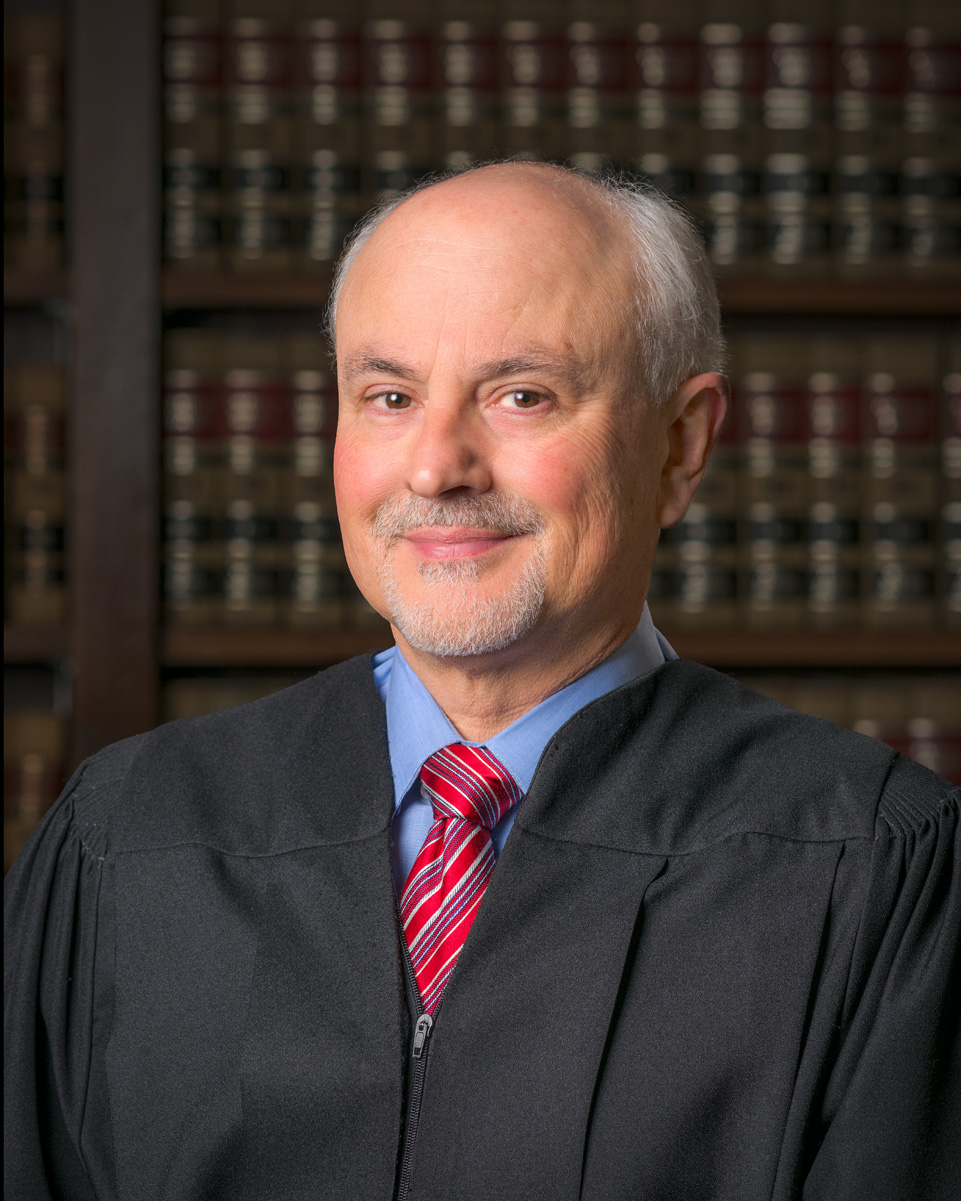
- Official portrait, 2020

Judge of the United States District Court for the Northern District of California
- Incumbent
- Assumed office February 26, 2014
- Appointed by: Barack Obama
- Preceded by: James Ware

Personal details
- Born: James Joseph Donato; 1960 (age 65–66) Pasadena, California, U.S.
- Education: University of California, Berkeley (BA); Harvard University (MA); Stanford University (JD)

James Joseph Donato (born in 1960) is an American attorney and judge. He has served as United States district judge of the United States District Court for the Northern District of California since 2014.

== Early life and education ==
Donato was born in 1960, in Pasadena, California. He received a Bachelor of Arts degree in 1983 from the University of California, Berkeley. He received a Master of Arts degree in 1984 from Harvard University. He received a Juris Doctor in 1988 from Stanford Law School, where he was an executive board member of the Stanford Law Review.

== Early career ==
Donato served as a law clerk for Judge Procter Ralph Hug Jr. of the United States Court of Appeals for the Ninth Circuit from 1988 to 1989. From 1990 to 1993, he was an associate at the law firm of Morrison & Foerster LLP in San Francisco. He served as a deputy city attorney in the San Francisco City Attorney's Office from 1993 to 1996. He served as a partner at Cooley LLP from 1996 to 2009.

From 2009 to 2014 he served as a litigation partner in the San Francisco office of Shearman & Sterling LLP. His practice concentrated on antitrust litigation and class action lawsuits. He is a past president of the Bar Association of San Francisco.

== Federal judicial service ==
=== Nomination ===
On June 20, 2013, President Barack Obama nominated Donato to serve as a United States District Judge of the United States District Court for the Northern District of California, to the seat vacated by Judge James Ware, who retired on August 31, 2012. His nomination was submitted to the Senate Judiciary Committee.

Donato's nomination hearing was held on September 11, 2013, before the committee. On October 31, 2013, Donato was unanimously reported out of the committee. On February 12, 2014, Senate Majority Leader Harry Reid filed for cloture on Donato's nomination. On February 25, 2014, the United States Senate invoked cloture on Donato’s nomination by a 55–42 vote, with 1 senator voted present. Later that day the nomination was confirmed by a 90–5 vote. Donato received his judicial commission on February 26, 2014.

=== Tenure ===
==== Pangea Legal Services v. U.S. Department of Homeland Security ====
On January 8, 2021, Donato issued an order blocking the implementation of a rule issued by the United States Department of Homeland Security and United States Department of Justice that would have created new restrictions for those seeking asylum in the United States. Donato ruled that purported Acting Secretary of Homeland Security Chad Wolf lacked authority to impose the rule because he had not been properly appointed to his position. Donato emphasized that he was the fifth federal judge to find that Wolf's appointment was unlawful and criticized the government for recycling the same arguments it had used to unsuccessfully defend Wolf's appointment in the past, writing: "In effect, the government keeps crashing the same car into a gate, hoping that someday it might break through."

Wolf resigned his post three days after Donato's ruling—and five days after the January 6, 2021, attack on the U.S. Capitol—saying his action was "warranted by recent events, including the ongoing and meritless court rulings regarding the validity of my authority as Acting secretary."

==== Other notable cases ====
In May 2020, Donato ruled that a patent for “Digital Cameras Using Multiple Sensors with Multiple Lenses" was invalid because it was directed at an abstract idea under Alice Corp. v. CLS Bank International. Donato said that the patent's representative claim was simply "drawn to the abstract idea of taking two pictures and using those pictures to enhance each other in some way," which is a practice that has been known "[s]ince the earliest days of the photographic medium." After the plaintiff was given an opportunity to amend his complaint, Donato again ruled that the patent was invalid. The United States Court of Appeals for the Federal Circuit upheld Donato's ruling in a 2-1 decision.

On August 26, 2020, Donato granted a preliminary injunction to eight states and four school districts that had sued to prevent the United States Department of Education and the United States Secretary of Education from implementing a rule imposing conditions on how funds allocated under the CARES Act would be shared between public and private schools. The rule allocated funds based on a school's total enrollment, rather than on the number of low-income students. It was controversial due to arguments that it diverted relief funds for the COVID-19 pandemic from public schools to private schools. Donato blocked the Department of Education and Secretary Betsy DeVos from enforcing this rule, saying their arguments in favor of it were a form of "'interpretive jiggery-pokery' in the extreme" (quoting Justice Antonin Scalia's dissent in King v. Burwell).

In February 2021, Donato approved a $650 million settlement between Facebook and a class of plaintiffs suing under the Illinois Biometric Information Privacy Act. Donato had previously rejected the settlement when it was worth only $550 million, and praised the revised settlement as "a major win for consumers in the hotly contested area of digital privacy." Two class members appealed to the United States Court of Appeals for the Ninth Circuit, which affirmed Donato's approval of the settlement on March 17, 2022.

Also in February 2021, Donato sentenced former California State Assemblyman Terrence Goggin to one year and one day in prison for money laundering, and ordered Goggin to pay $685,000 in restitution for his victims.

In May 2022, Donato dismissed a lawsuit brought by then-former President Donald Trump against the social media company Twitter (now X) over its decision to permanently remove him from the Twitter platform.

On February 28, 2024, Donato ruled that California's permanent prohibition of individuals who have had their convictions vacated, set aside, or dismissed, from possessing firearms violated the Second Amendment as applied to the individual Plaintiffs.

== Sources ==
- James Donato at Ballotpedia

Legal offices
Preceded by James Ware	Judge of the United States District Court for the Northern District of California; 2014–present	Incumbent
