= Eveline Shen =

Executive of nonprofit Forward Together

Eveline Shen is the executive director and board president of West Coast-based reproductive justice nonprofit, Forward Together.

She started in the organization in 1999 and is credited for making the organization more widely known. Under her leadership, for example, the organization changed its name from "Asian Communities for Reproductive Justice," evolved its programs, geographic scope, and role in the reproductive justice movement.

In 2006, she wrote for the Center for American Progress.
