= Jon S. Tigar =

American judge (born 1962)

Judge of the United States District Court for the Northern District of California
- Incumbent
- Assumed office January 18, 2013
- Appointed by: Barack Obama
- Preceded by: Saundra Brown Armstrong

Personal details
- Born: 1962 (age 62–63) London, United Kingdom
- Parent: Michael Tigar
- Education: Williams College (BA); University of California, Berkeley (JD)

Jon S. Tigar (born 1962) is an American lawyer serving as a United States district judge of the United States District Court for the Northern District of California. He was previously a California state court judge on the Alameda County Superior Court from 2002 to 2013.

== Early life and education ==
Tigar is the son of attorney Michael Tigar. He graduated from Williams College in 1984 with a Bachelor of Arts degree in economics and English literature. He spent two years working as a paralegal, then attended the UC Berkeley School of Law, where he was an articles editor of the California Law Review and a research assistant to professor Melvin Eisenberg. He graduated in 1989 with a Juris Doctor degree and Order of the Coif honors.

== Career ==
After graduating from law school, Tigar served as a law clerk for Judge Robert Smith Vance of the United States Court of Appeals for the Eleventh Circuit from 1989 to 1990. During Tigar's clerkship, Vance was killed by a mail bomb sent to his home.

From 1990 until 1992, Tigar served as a litigation associate for the law firm Morrison & Foerster. He then served as a public defender in San Francisco from 1993 until 1994. Tigar practiced complex commercial litigation, and became a partner, at the law firm Keker & Van Nest from 1994 until 2002. From 2002 to 2013, Tigar served as a judge on the Alameda County Superior Court.

Tigar is an elected member of the American Law Institute, for which he served as an adviser to the Restatement (Third) of Torts: Liability for Economic Loss and now serves in the same capacity on the forthcoming Restatement (Third) of Torts: Defamation and Privacy. Tigar has taught Pretrial Litigation at UC Berkeley School of Law. He previously served as a member of the California Judicial Council's Advisory Committee on Civil Jury Instructions and the Ninth Circuit's Jury Instructions Committee. From 2016 to 2019, he was the Judicial Representative to the Section of Antitrust Law of the American Bar Association. He is a Fellow of the American Bar Foundation.

=== Federal judicial service ===
On June 11, 2012, President Barack Obama nominated Tigar to be a judge on the United States District Court for the Northern District of California, taking the seat vacated by Judge Saundra Brown Armstrong, who assumed senior status on March 23, 2012. The United States Senate Committee on the Judiciary held a hearing on his nomination on July 11, 2012, and reported his nomination to the floor on August 2, 2012. The Senate confirmed his nomination by unanimous consent on December 21, 2012. He received his commission on January 18, 2013.

== Notable decisions ==
- On April 2, 2015, Tigar ordered the California Department of Corrections ("CDCR") to provide a gender reassignment surgery to a transgender inmate, finding that such surgery was the only adequate medical treatment for the inmate's gender dysphoria.
- Since August 2017, Tigar has presided over Plata v. Newsom, a case concerning the constitutional adequacy of medical care in the California state prison system. On September 27, 2021, Tigar ordered that all CDCR staff, including medical and custody staff, be vaccinated against COVID-19, subject to medical and religious exemption. Tigar found that because the undisputed evidence showed that staff were the means for COVID to enter the prisons, allowing prison employees to remain unvaccinated violated incarcerated persons' Eighth Amendment Constitutional rights. On April 25, 2022, the Ninth Circuit Court of Appeals vacated Tigar's order, finding that CDCR's refusal to require its custody staff to accept the vaccine did not constitute deliberate indifference.
- On November 19, 2018, Tigar issued a nationwide injunction barring the Trump administration from enforcing a rule that would deny asylum to anyone who entered the United States somewhere other than at a designated port of entry. Complaining about the ruling, President Trump characterized Tigar as an "Obama judge"—prompting Chief Justice John Roberts to respond, "We do not have Obama judges or Trump judges, Bush judges or Clinton judges. What we have is an extraordinary group of dedicated judges doing their level best to do equal right to those appearing before them. That independent judiciary is something we should all be thankful for." United States Court of Appeals for the Ninth Circuit upheld Tigar's injunction, and the Supreme Court allowed it to remain in place pending appeal. On February 2, 2021, President Biden signed Executive Order 14010 revoking Proclamation 9880 of May 9, 2019 (Addressing Mass Migration Through the Southern Border of the United States), thereby abrogating the rule limiting asylum claims.
- On July 24, 2019, Tigar issued a nationwide injunction that barred the Trump administration from denying asylum to persons who crossed through but did not apply for asylum in a third country. In August, the Court of Appeals for the Ninth Circuit found the administration's asylum policy "likely violated federal regulatory law" but narrowed Tigar's injunction to apply only within the Ninth Circuit. On September 9, 2019, Tigar reinstated the nationwide scope of the injunction. The Supreme Court stayed both orders on September 11, 2019, without addressing the legality of the administration's asylum policy. On July 6, 2020, the Ninth Circuit affirmed the injunction blocking the third country asylum bar and upheld the nationwide scope of the injunction.
- In November 2020, Tigar issued an order enjoining the California Department of Motor Vehicles from enforcing a ban on personalized license plate configurations it found “offensive to good taste and decency” on the grounds that the regulation violated the First Amendment to the United States Constitution. Tigar wrote that the DMV's “good taste and decency” standard created “a facial distinction between societally favored and disfavored ideas” and that “the public expression of ideas may not be prohibited merely because the ideas are themselves offensive to some of their hearers.”
- On June 9, 2025, Tigar issued an order enjoining the Trump administration from enforcing the provisions of particular Executive Orders that required the termination of all "equity-related" contracts and grants and the termination of all funding for any programs that "promote gender ideology." The plaintiffs in the case were "a group of nonprofit organizations that provide healthcare, social services, and advocacy for LGBTQ communities—many specifically serving transgender individuals—and that rely heavily on federal funding to carry out their missions." "The Court reasoned that the vagueness of the language 'equity-related' and the lack of any definition is likely to inhibit the exercise of freedom of expression because it provides no guidance to grantees as to how they can modify their expression to avoid termination or from even assessing what grants are implicated."
- Tigar has presided over securities fraud lawsuits involving some of America’s largest corporations, including Netflix, Facebook, Super Micro Computer, Twitter, Wells Fargo Bank, and Yelp. Writing in the New York Times, financial writer Gretchen Morgenson called Judge Tigar’s ruling in the Wells Fargo case “both unusual and welcome.”

Legal offices
Preceded by Saundra Brown Armstrong	Judge of the United States District Court for the Northern District of California; 2012–present	Incumbent
