= Claudia Ann Wilken =

American federal judge (born 1949)

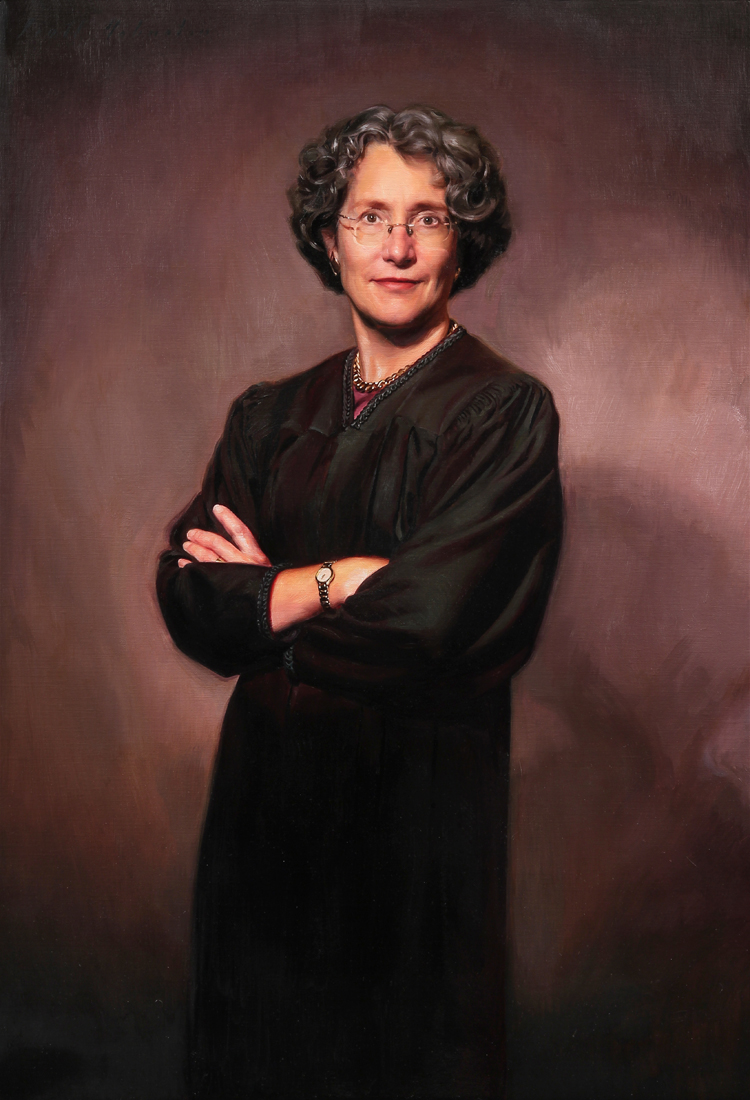
- Official portrait

Senior Judge of the United States District Court for the Northern District of California
- Incumbent
- Assumed office December 17, 2014

Chief Judge of the United States District Court for the Northern District of California
- In office August 31, 2012 – December 17, 2014
- Preceded by: James Ware
- Succeeded by: Phyllis J. Hamilton

Judge of the United States District Court for the Northern District of California
- In office November 22, 1993 – December 17, 2014
- Appointed by: Bill Clinton
- Preceded by: Seat established by 104 Stat. 5089
- Succeeded by: Haywood Gilliam

Magistrate Judge of the United States District Court for the Northern District of California
- In office 1983–1993

Personal details
- Born: August 17, 1949 (age 77) Minneapolis, Minnesota, U.S.
- Education: Stanford University (BA); University of California, Berkeley (JD)

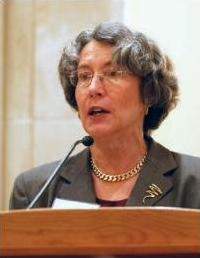

Claudia Ann Wilken (born August 17, 1949) is an American lawyer and jurist serving as a senior United States district judge of the U.S. District Court for the Northern District of California. She was appointed in 1993 by President Bill Clinton. She served as the Northern District of California's chief judge from 2012 to 2014, when she assumed senior status.

== Education and career ==
Born in Minneapolis, Minnesota, Wilken received a Bachelor of Arts degree from Stanford University in 1971 and a Juris Doctor from the University of California, Berkeley School of Law (Boalt Hall) in 1975. She was a Staff attorney of Federal Public Defender's Office, Northern District of California from 1975 to 1978. She was in private practice in Berkeley, California from 1978 to 1984. She was an adjunct professor, University of California, Boalt Hall School of Law from 1978 to 1984. She was a professor, New College School of Law from 1980 to 1985.

== Federal judicial service ==
Wilken was nominated by President Bill Clinton on October 7, 1993, to a new seat created by 104 Stat. 5089. She was confirmed by the United States Senate on November 20, 1993, and received her commission on November 22, 1993. She served as chief judge from August 31, 2012, until December 17, 2014, at which time she assumed senior status.

Wilken was formerly a United States magistrate judge for the United States District Court for the Northern District of California, from 1983 to 1993.

== Notable cases ==
In 2014 Wilken ruled against the NCAA in O'Bannon v. NCAA, saying that the organization violated the Sherman Antitrust Act by prohibiting universities from giving student-athletes a share of the revenues earned when their image and personal details were broadcast over television or through other contracts. For this, in 2014 she was named one of ESPNW's Impact 25.

In 2019 Wilken ruled against the NCAA in what eventually got appealed to the Supreme Court as NCAA v. Alston, finding that limiting the compensation student-athletes could receive for their athletic services violates antitrust law.

== Sources ==
Legal offices
Preceded by Seat established by 104 Stat. 5089	Judge of the United States District Court for the Northern District of California; 1993–2014	Succeeded by Haywood Gilliam
Preceded by James Ware	Chief Judge of the United States District Court for the Northern District of California; 2012–2014	Succeeded by Phyllis J. Hamilton
