= Alfonso Zirpoli =

American judge (1905-1995)

Alfonso Joseph Zirpoli

Senior Judge of the United States District Court for the Northern District of California
- In office September 30, 1975 – July 10, 1995

Judge of the United States District Court for the Northern District of California
- In office September 22, 1961 – September 30, 1975
- Appointed by: John F. Kennedy
- Preceded by: Seat established by 75 Stat. 80
- Succeeded by: William Austin Ingram

Personal details
- Born: Alfonso Joseph Zirpoli; April 12, 1905 Denver, Colorado
- Died: July 10, 1995 (aged 90) San Francisco, California
- Education: University of California, Berkeley (A.B.); UC Berkeley School of Law (J.D.)

Alfonso Joseph Zirpoli (April 12, 1905 – July 10, 1995) was a United States district judge of the United States District Court for the Northern District of California.

== Early life ==
Born in Denver, Colorado, Zirpoli received an Artium Baccalaureus degree from the University of California, Berkeley in 1926 and a Juris Doctor from the UC Berkeley School of Law in 1928.

== Career ==
He was in private practice in San Francisco, California from 1928 to 1932. He was an assistant district attorney of the City and County of San Francisco from 1932 to 1933, and an Assistant United States Attorney of the Northern District of California from 1933 to 1944. He returned to private practice in San Francisco from 1944 to 1961, also serving on the San Francisco Board of Supervisors from 1958 to 1961.

During his time as an attorney, he represented death row inmates pro bono.

=== Federal judicial service ===
On September 14, 1961, Zirpoli was nominated by President John F. Kennedy to a new seat on the United States District Court for the Northern District of California created by 75 Stat. 80. He was confirmed by the United States Senate on September 21, 1961, and received his commission the following day.

Zirpoli broadened the rights of conscientious objector in during the Vietnam War draft, which prompted President Richard Nixon to call him "the worst judge on the Federal Bench."

During the Zebra murders, over 600 black men were stopped by the police due to the ambiguous descriptors provided by witnesses. In a motion filed by the NAACP and the American Civil Liberties Union, Zirpoli ruled that the police's stop and search program was unconstitutional and halted it. The order said that the police must have supporting evidence that arouses reasonable suspicion before stopping suspects and that stopping people solely due to purported similarities to the witnesses' description is forbidden.

He assumed senior status on September 30, 1975, serving in that capacity until his death on July 10, 1995, in San Francisco.

== Personal life ==
Zirpoli was a life long Democrat, having worked on every Democratic presidential campaign between 1928 and 1960. He was married to Giselda Zirpoli. They had two daughters.

== Sources ==
Legal offices
Preceded by Seat established by 75 Stat. 80	Judge of the United States District Court for the Northern District of California; 1961–1975	Succeeded by William Austin Ingram
