= Ibrahim Youssri Hussein =

Egyptian diplomat, lawyer and political activist (1930–2019)

Ibrahim Yousri Hussein
- إبراهيم يسري حسين عبد الرحمن
- Born: Ibrahim Yousri Hussein Abd al-Rahman; 1930; Salamoun, Sharqia Governorate, Kingdom of Egypt
- Died: 10 June 2019 (aged 88–89); Cairo, Egypt
- Citizenship: Kingdom of Egypt (1930–1952); Republic of Egypt (1953–1958); United Arab Republic (1958–1971); Egypt (1971–2019)
- Education: University of California, Berkeley
- Occupations: Diplomat; lawyer; politician; activist
- Years active: 1963–2019
- Known for: Campaign against gas exports to Israel; Taba negotiations; Legal challenges on national sovereignty
- Children: 4
- Awards: Leadership Development Center Award (2012)

Ambassador of Egypt to Algeria
- In office 1989 – c. early 1990s

Ibrahim Yousri Hussein Abd al-Rahman (Arabic: إبراهيم يسري حسين عبد الرحمن); 1930 – 10 June 2019) was an Egyptian diplomat, international lawyer, and political activist. He served as Assistant Minister of Foreign Affairs for International Law and Treaties and concluded his diplomatic career as Egypt's Ambassador to Algeria until his retirement in 1995.

Following his retirement from the diplomatic service, Yousri became widely known for his legal activism, particularly his campaign against Egypt's natural gas export agreement with Israel, which he argued was unconstitutional and economically detrimental to Egypt. He also filed legal challenges against the construction of the Egypt–Gaza barrier, the transfer of the Tiran and Sanafir islands to Saudi Arabia, and various other national sovereignty issues.

== Early life and education ==
Ibrahim Yousri Hussein Abd al-Rahman was born in 1930 in the village of Salamoun in Hihya District, Sharqia Governorate, in Egypt's Nile Delta region. His father was an al-Azhar scholar. After his father's death, Yousri inherited land in his native district but chose to donate it to establish two educational institutions—a preparatory school and a primary school—retaining only a portion for his own educational expenses and those of his family.

Yousri studied art criticism at the University of California, Berkeley where he developed an interest in Hindustani classical music and learned the Hindustani language.

== Career ==
=== Public servant ===
Yousri began his diplomatic career in 1963 as a second secretary at the Egyptian Embassy in Iraq. His posting coincided with the Ba'athist coup d'état that overthrew Abd al-Karim Qasim's government. President Gamal Abdel Nasser issued special directives allowing diplomats who had endured difficult conditions during the communist period to transfer to other Egyptian embassies or receive compensation for expenses incurred during their service. Despite these options, Yousri chose to remain at his post in Baghdad.

Following his tenure in Iraq, Yousri was posted to Bucharest, Romania, during a period when Romania recognized the State of Israel, prompting Egypt to sever diplomatic relations with the Eastern Bloc nation—an event that occurred before Anwar Sadat's historic 1977 visit to Jerusalem. Subsequently, Yousri was posted to India, where he served during a period of Egyptian-Indian cooperation within the Non-Aligned Movement.

In 1989, Yousri was promoted as ambassador to Algeria, and served during the 1989 Africa Cup of Nations match between Egypt and Algeria, which escalated into a serious bilateral diplomatic dispute. Yousri successfully persuaded Algeria to host three friendly football matches between the two countries' national teams as a face-saving resolution for both nations. During the first of these matches, Egyptian players reportedly walked the field wrapped in the Algerian flag and scattered flowers to Algerian supporters, symbolizing reconciliation. Recalled from Algiers, Yousri was assigned to a ceremonial position without substantive duties at the Foreign Ministry, where he remained until his retirement in 1995.

At the Egyptian Ministry of Foreign Affairs, Yousri served as Assistant Minister of Foreign Affairs for International Law and Treaties, where he played an active role in the Taba negotiations as part of the 2001 Israeli-Palestinian peace talks. During the mid-1980s, the Egyptian Foreign Ministry opposed American attempts to establish a military base at Ras Banas on Egypt's Red Sea coast. Yousri contributed to legal arguments against the initiative and also participated in efforts to prevent American nuclear-powered vessels from transiting the Suez Canal, though higher political authorities ultimately overrode the Foreign Ministry's legal objections on the latter matter.

=== Political activism ===
After retiring in 1995, Yousri transitioned to private legal practice. His combination of diplomatic expertise, international law knowledge, and political credibility attracted major multinational corporations seeking advice on navigating Egyptian legal and regulatory frameworks.

==== Natural gas exports to Israel ====
Yousri's most prominent post-retirement activism focused on challenging Egypt's 2005 agreement to export natural gas to Israel—a deal that became controversial within Egyptian society. The agreement stipulated that Egypt would export 1.7 billion cubic meters of natural gas annually to Israel at below-market prices. Beginning around 2008, Yousri filed lawsuits challenging the 20-year gas export agreement, arguing that Egypt was losing approximately $9 million per day under the fixed-price arrangement compared to international market rates. His arguments also possessed nationalist resonance; he pointed out that the gas pipeline route from El-Arish to Ashkelon, along which Egyptian gas would flow to Israel, traced the path where Egyptian soldiers had been killed during successive Arab–Israeli wars. Yousri further argued that the gas export agreement violated constitutional principles, contending that it was reached secretly without public knowledge or parliamentary oversight in violation of Article 151 of the Egyptian Constitution. In February 2010, the Supreme Administrative Court issued an order to halt all natural gas exports to Israel, stipulating that the agreement's terms required revision regarding export amounts and pricing structure. At the time, Yousri stated:

"As a man of the law, I don't care about potential international pressure, I care about the law only. As a politician, I say that if there is pressure against implementing the law, then the objecting parties should make up for the financial loss incurred on Egypt by the deal."

Yousri received substantial public support for his campaign, with activists and ordinary Egyptians contributing approximately E£16,000 to pay fines and penalties he incurred for his activism. The April 6 Youth Movement reportedly provided security protection for him during court appearances due to concerns about potential government retaliation.

==== Gaza border wall ====
In 2010, Yousri participated in legal action against the construction of an underground steel barrier along the Egypt-Gaza border. Alongside more than 1,350 activists, parliamentarians, and intellectuals—including novelist Alaa Al Aswany, human rights lawyer Abdel Halim Qandil, and Muslim Brotherhood parliamentarian Mohamed el-Beltagy—he filed suit before the State Council's Administrative Court challenging the wall's construction. The petitioners argued that the barrier violated Egypt's obligations to Palestinians and contravened international humanitarian law principles. They demanded immediate cessation of construction and opening of the Rafah border crossing to allow humanitarian aid to reach Gaza's civilian population. Yousri declared that the signatures and activism reflected genuine popular consensus against what he characterized as a barrier that isolated and harmed Palestinians.

==== Tiran and Sanafir islands ====
In 2016, Yousri participated in legal challenges against Egypt's agreement to transfer sovereignty of the Red Sea islands of Tiran and Sanafir to Saudi Arabia. Located in the Straits of Tiran, which connect the Gulf of Aqaba to the Red Sea, these islands hold strategic significance for maritime traffic to Jordan and Israel. Yousri filed a lawsuit challenging this territorial cession as unconstitutional, arguing that Article 151 of the Egyptian Constitution prohibited any treaty leading to relinquishment of state territory without a national referendum and substantial parliamentary supermajority. Though some lower courts initially ruled against the island transfer, the Supreme Constitutional Court ultimately upheld the validity of the Saudi-Egyptian agreement.

==== Grand Ethiopian Renaissance Dam ====
Yousri participated in legal challenges against the construction of the Grand Ethiopian Renaissance Dam, a massive hydroelectric project Ethiopia began constructing in 2011 on the Blue Nile. This litigation represented an expansive vision of national sovereignty concerns, extending to the defence of Egyptian rights to Nile River waters. The dam dispute involved complex questions of international water law, treaty interpretation, and the rights of upstream versus downstream riparian states, with Egypt arguing that the project threatened its water security.

==== Other activism ====
Throughout his post-retirement career, Yousri initiated or participated in numerous other legal cases, including:

- Lawsuits to open streets surrounding the Israeli ambassador's residence in Maadi and the American Embassy in Garden City, which Yousri viewed as excessive security cordons that prevented ordinary Egyptian citizens from accessing public streets
- Legal action to permit humanitarian aid convoys to reach Gaza through the Rafah crossing
- A complaint with the Egyptian Public Prosecutor's Office demanding the arrest of Israeli Prime Minister Benjamin Netanyahu should he visit Egypt, holding him responsible for the deaths of approximately 1,500 Palestinians during military operations in Gaza, which Yousri characterized as a "Holocaust of Gaza"

==== Political offices ====
Yousri served as head of the National Conscience Front (NCF), a political organization that occupied a distinct position in Egyptian politics—neither fully aligned with the Muslim Brotherhood-led government of Mohamed Morsi nor with the secular National Salvation Front opposition coalition. In April 2013, during Morsi's presidency, the Conscience Front held a press conference at Yousri's house in Cairo to announce their support for amendments to the Judiciary Law being discussed by the Shura Council. In May 2013, during the Sinai hostage crisis, Yousri and the National Conscience Front publicly praised President Morsi, the armed forces, the Ministry of Interior, and "Sinai's honourable men" for their roles in resolving the crisis. Yousri criticized the National Salvation Front, the main secular opposition coalition led by figures such as Mohamed ElBaradei, for boycotting Morsi's invitation to national dialogue, characterizing the NSF as "a hostile obstinate opposition that persistently refuses to uphold the interests of the country." This positioning reflected Yousri's consistent emphasis on constitutional governance and legal process rather than strict ideological alignment with particular political movements.

Following the removal of President Mohamed Morsi on 3 July 2013, Yousri emerged as a figure in opposition to the military-backed government. In May 2014, after Abdel Fattah el-Sisi's assumption of the presidency, he was among three opposition figures who signed the "Brussels Statement" on 7 May 2014, alongside academic Seif el-Din Abdel-Fattah and poet Abdel Rahman Youssef. The statement proposed a new political framework for Egypt's future and represented a significant political initiative by intellectuals and civil society figures seeking to articulate an alternative vision for Egypt's governance.

== Personal life ==
Yousri had three daughters and one son. One of his daughters, Mona Yousri Hussein, became a pediatric psychologist specializing in child mental health.

In 2012, the Center for Leadership Training and Business Administration in Cairo honoured Yousri, formally recognizing him as "hero of the battle to stop gas exports to Israel."

Yousri died in Cairo on 10 June 2019, after a prolonged illness, aged c. 88 years.

=== Legacy ===
Yousri's career bridged establishment diplomacy and popular activism, reflecting a consistent commitment to defending Egyptian sovereignty and constitutional order. His litigation strategy exemplified legal mobilization—the strategic deployment of court systems to address political and social controversies—and contributed to the phenomenon scholars termed the "judicialization of mega-politics" in Egyptian administrative courts. His cases established important precedents in Egyptian administrative law regarding standing to challenge government decisions affecting national interests, and contributed to debates about judicial review of executive power in matters of strategic national importance.

== Published works ==
- رجل وأربع نساء [A Man and Four Women] (in Arabic). – a novel that explored the 1952 Egyptian revolution and the Nasser era

== See also ==
- List of Egyptian ambassadors
