= Thelton Henderson =

American judge (born 1933)

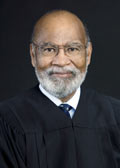

Senior Judge of the United States District Court for the Northern District of California
- Incumbent
- Assumed office November 28, 1998

Chief Judge of the United States District Court for the Northern District of California
- In office 1990–1997
- Preceded by: William Austin Ingram
- Succeeded by: Marilyn Hall Patel

Judge of the United States District Court for the Northern District of California
- In office June 30, 1980 – November 28, 1998
- Appointed by: Jimmy Carter
- Preceded by: Cecil F. Poole
- Succeeded by: William Alsup

Personal details
- Born: Thelton Eugene Henderson; November 28, 1933 (age 92) Shreveport, Louisiana, U.S.
- Education: University of California, Berkeley (BA, JD)

Thelton Eugene Henderson (born November 28, 1933) is an inactive senior United States district judge of the United States District Court for the Northern District of California. He has played an important role in the field of civil rights as a lawyer, educator, and jurist.

== Early life ==
Born on November 28, 1933, in Shreveport, Louisiana, Henderson left the Jim Crow South with his mother and grandmother for Los Angeles, California. Raised in Los Angeles from the age of three, he credited his mother, a house cleaner, as a major educational influence who encouraged him to prepare for college.

== Education and career ==
Henderson received a Bachelor of Arts degree from the University of California, Berkeley in 1956. He became one of the first African Americans to earn a football scholarship to UC Berkeley. Henderson was the first in his family to attend college. He received a Juris Doctor from the UC Berkeley School of Law in 1962, where he was one of only two Black students in his class. At Berkeley, he participated in the Afro-American Association, a study group.

He served in the United States Army as a corporal from 1956 to 1958 and was the first African-American attorney for the Civil Rights Division of the United States Department of Justice from 1962 to 1963. He was in private practice of law in Oakland, California from 1964 to 1966. He was the Directing Attorney of the East Bayshore Neighborhood Legal Center in East Palo Alto, California from 1966 to 1969. He was an assistant dean at Stanford Law School from 1968 to 1977, where he designed and implemented a successful minority recruitment program. He was in private practice of law in San Francisco, California from 1977 to 1980. He was an associate professor at the Golden Gate University School of Law from 1978 to 1980.

=== Notable service ===
Henderson was sent to the South to monitor local law enforcement for any civil rights abuses, a role that included investigating the 1963 16th Street Baptist Church bombing, which killed four girls. In this capacity, he became acquainted with Martin Luther King Jr. and other leaders of the Civil Rights Movement after winning over their initial skepticism of a government attorney.

In 1963, Henderson lent his government car to Martin Luther King, Jr., who needed transportation to Selma, Alabama. Alabama Governor George Wallace later claimed that Henderson had driven King to Selma, although Henderson had not been in the car. After the incident drew political scrutiny, Henderson submitted his resignation from the Civil Rights Division, which Attorney General Robert F. Kennedy accepted.

Henderson also engaged in international civil rights work. In the 1980s, he traveled to South Africa with other American jurists and lawyers to meet with Black legal practitioners, examine the apartheid legal system, and share United States civil rights experience.

== Federal judicial service ==
Henderson was nominated by President Jimmy Carter on May 9, 1980, to a seat on the United States District Court for the Northern District of California vacated by Judge Cecil F. Poole. He was confirmed by the United States Senate on June 26, 1980, and received his commission on June 30, 1980. He was the second African American federal judge in the Northern District of California and, from 1990 to 1997, served as the district's first African American chief judge. He assumed senior status on November 28, 1998. He took inactive senior status on August 11, 2017, meaning that while he remains a federal judge, he no longer hears cases or participates in the business of the court. Later that same year he joined Berkeley Law as a Distinguished Visitor.

== Notable cases ==
In the late 1980s, Henderson presided over a long-running case over the fishing industry's practice of snaring dolphins in its tuna nets. Environmental groups charged that millions of dolphins had drowned because of the industry's refusal to follow existing safety regulations. He rejected attempts by the Clinton and Bush administrations to relax legal standards on fishing practices and loosen dolphin safe labeling on tuna.

In 1982 Henderson overturned the conviction of Johnny Spain, the only member of The San Quentin Six convicted of murder for the deaths of three California Correctional Peace Officers and two inmates in a riot and escape attempt led by Black Panther Party member and Black Guerilla Family founder George Jackson (Black Panther). In a landmark 1995 civil rights case, Madrid v. Gomez, Henderson found the use of force and level of medical care at Pelican Bay State Prison unconstitutional. During its subsequent federal oversight process, Henderson was known to visit the prison personally.

Henderson also oversaw reforms of the Oakland Police Department following a federal consent decree in Allen v. City of Oakland. The decree arose from allegations of police misconduct and required the department to implement court-supervised reforms.

In a 1997 decision, he struck down Proposition 209, the anti-affirmative action California initiative, as unconstitutional, but the next year a three-judge Court of Appeals panel overturned his decision.

In 2005, Henderson found that substandard medical care in the California prison system had violated prisoners' rights under the Eighth Amendment to the United States Constitution to be protected from cruel and unusual punishment and had led to unnecessary deaths in California prisons.

In 2006 he appointed Robert Sillen as receiver to take over the health care system of the California Department of Corrections and Rehabilitation; he replaced Sillen with J. Clark Kelso in 2008.

== Honors and recognition ==
Henderson's awards include the American Bar Association's Thurgood Marshall Award, the State Bar of California's Bernard Witkin Medal, the Pearlstein Civil Rights Award from the Anti-Defamation League, the Distinguished Service Award by the National Bar Association the Lewis F. Powell, Jr. Award for Professionalism and Ethics from the American Inns of Court, the Judge Learned Hand Award from the American Jewish Committee, and the 2008 Alumnus of the Year Award from the California Alumni Association at the University of California, Berkeley. In 2024, he was inducted into the California Hall of Fame.

The Thelton E. Henderson Center for Social Justice at Berkeley Law is named for him. The law school building was formerly named Boalt Hall. A documentary on his life, Soul of Justice by Abby Ginzberg, was released in late 2005. The Northern District of California dedicated its ceremonial courtroom in San Francisco to him in 2017. In July 2025, the University of California at Berkeley announced a $6 million gift to establish the Thelton E. Henderson '62 Chair in Civil Rights Law.

== See also ==
- List of African-American federal judges
- List of African-American jurists
- List of United States federal judges by longevity of service

Legal offices
Preceded by Cecil F. Poole	Judge of the United States District Court for the Northern District of California; 1980–1998	Succeeded by William Alsup
Preceded by William Austin Ingram	Chief Judge of the United States District Court for the Northern District of California; 1990–1997	Succeeded by Marilyn Hall Patel
