= Spencer Mortimer Williams =

American judge

Senior Judge of the United States District Court for the Northern District of California
- In office February 24, 1987 – January 3, 2008

Judge of the United States District Court for the Northern District of California
- In office July 29, 1971 – February 24, 1987
- Appointed by: Richard Nixon
- Preceded by: Seat established by 84 Stat. 294
- Succeeded by: Vaughn Walker

Personal details
- Born: Spencer Mortimer Williams; February 24, 1922 Reading, Massachusetts
- Died: January 3, 2008 (aged 85) Carmichael, California
- Education: University of California, Los Angeles (A.B.); UC Berkeley School of Law (LL.B.)

Spencer Mortimer Williams (February 24, 1922 – January 3, 2008) was a United States district judge of the United States District Court for the Northern District of California.

== Education and career ==
Born in Reading, Massachusetts, Williams was in the United States Navy as a Lieutenant (JG) during World War II, from 1943 to 1946. He received an Artium Baccalaureus degree from the University of California, Los Angeles in 1943 and a Bachelor of Laws from the UC Berkeley School of Law in 1948. He was in private practice in San Jose, California from 1948 to 1949. He was deputy county counsel of Santa Clara County, California from 1949 to 1950. He was a United States Naval Reserve Lieutenant from 1950 to 1952. He was county counsel for Santa Clara County from 1952 to 1966. He was Secretary of the California State Human Relations Agency from 1967 to 1970. He was in private practice in Sacramento and San Jose, California from 1970 to 1971.

== Federal judicial service ==
Williams was nominated by President Richard Nixon on June 12, 1971, to the United States District Court for the Northern District of California, to a new seat created by 84 Stat. 294. He was confirmed by the United States Senate on July 29, 1971, and received his commission the same day. He assumed senior status on February 23, 1987. Williams served in that capacity until his death on January 3, 2008, in Carmichael, California.

== Sources ==
Legal offices
Preceded by Seat established by 84 Stat. 294	Judge of the United States District Court for the Northern District of California; 1971–1987	Succeeded by Vaughn Walker
