= List of law clerks for the second seat of the Supreme Court of the United States =

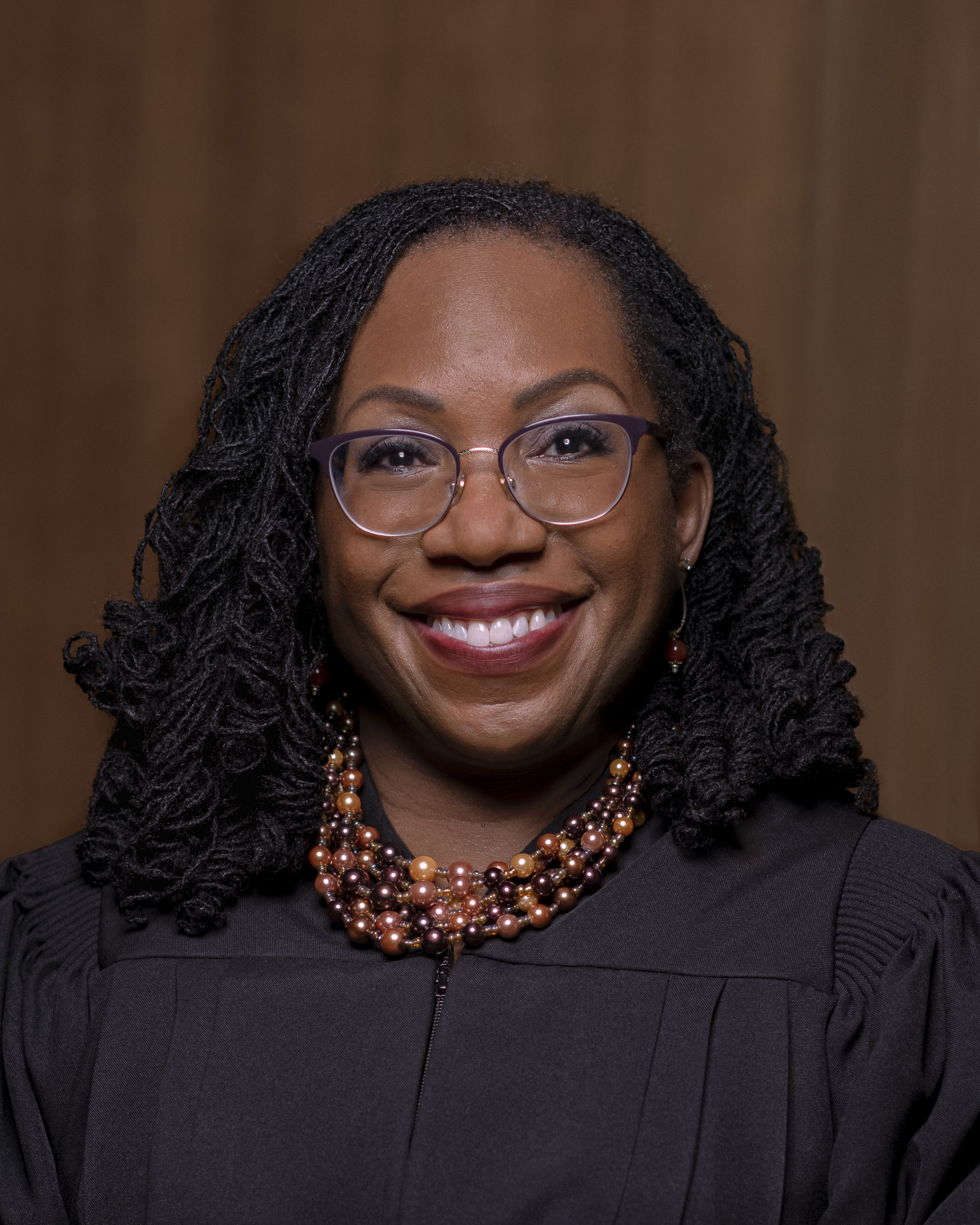
Ketanji Brown Jackson, 116th associate justice of the U.S. Supreme Court, clerked for her predecessor Justice Stephen Breyer during the 1999–2000 term.

Law clerks have assisted the justices of the United States Supreme Court in various capacities since the first one was hired by Justice Horace Gray in 1882. Each justice is permitted to have between three and four law clerks per Court term. Most persons serving in this capacity are recent law school graduates (and typically graduated at the top of their class). Among their many functions, clerks do legal research that assists justices in deciding what cases to accept and what questions to ask during oral arguments, prepare memoranda, and draft orders and opinions. After retiring from the Court, a justice may continue to employ a law clerk, who may be assigned to provide additional assistance to an active justice or may assist the retired justice when sitting by designation with a lower court.

== Table of law clerks ==
The following is a table of law clerks serving the associate justice holding the second seat of the Supreme Court (the Court's second associate justice seat by the order of precedence of the inaugural associate justices (Note: Their place in the order of precedence was based upon the seniority of their commission from President George Washington following their confirmation by the U.S. Senate.)) which was established on September 24, 1789 by the 1st Congress through the Judiciary Act of 1789 (1 Stat. 73). This seat is currently occupied by Justice Ketanji Brown Jackson.

Seat 2 associate justices and law clerks

Horace Gray

January 9, 1882 –
September 15, 1902

Clerk	Started	Finished	School (year)	Previous clerkship
Thomas A. Russell	1882	1883	Harvard (1882)	
William Schofield	1883	1885	Harvard (1883)	none
Henry Eldridge Warner	1885	1886	Harvard (1885)	
William H. Dunbar	1886	1887	Harvard (1886)	
Edward Twisleton Cabot	1887	1888	Harvard (1886)	
Samuel Williston	1888	1889	Harvard (1888)	none
Blewett Harrison Lee	1889	1890	Harvard (1888)	
Francis Richard Jones	1890	1891	Harvard (1890)	
Ezra Ripley Thayer	1891	1892	Harvard (1891)	
Moses Day Kimball	1892	1893	Harvard (1892)	
James M. Newell	1892	1893	Harvard (1893)	
Gordon Taylor Hughes	1894	1895	Harvard (1894)	
Jeremiah Smith Jr.	1895	1896	Harvard (1895)	
Charles L. Barlow	1896	1897	Harvard (1896)	
Robert Homans	1897	1898	Harvard (1897)	
Roland Gray	1898	1899	Harvard (1898)	
John Gorham Palfrey	1899	1900	Harvard (1899)	
Joseph Warren	1900	1901	Harvard (1900)	
Langdon Parker Marvin	1901	1902	Harvard (1901)	

Oliver Wendell Holmes Jr.

December 8, 1902 –
January 12, 1932

Clerk	Started	Finished	School (year)	Previous clerkship
Charles K. Poe	1903	1906	GW-Columbian (1905)	
Augustin Derby	1906	1907	Harvard (1906)	none
Howard Stockton Jr.	1907	1908	Harvard (1907)	
Erland F. Fish	1908	1909	Harvard (1908)	
Leland B. Duer	1909	1910	Harvard (1909)	
Irving S. Olds	1910	1911	Harvard (1910)	none
Francis B. Biddle	1911	1912	Harvard (1911)	none
Stanley Clarke	1912	1913	Harvard (1912)	
George L. Harrison	1913	1914	Harvard (1913)	
Harvey Hollister Bundy	1914	1915	Harvard (1914)	
Chauncey Belknap	1915	1916	Harvard (1915)	
Shelton Hale	1916	1917	Harvard (1916)	
Vaughn Miller	1917	1918	Harvard (1917)	
Lloyd H. Landau	1918	1919	Harvard (1918)	
Stanley Morrison	1919	1920	Harvard (1917)	
Day Kimball	1920	1921	Harvard (1920)	
Laurence Curtis	1921	1922	Harvard (1921)	none
Robert M. Benjamin	1922	1923	Harvard (1922)	
James M. Nicely	1923	1924	Harvard (1923)	
W. Barton Leach	1924	1925	Harvard (1924)	none
Charles Denby Jr.	1925	1926	Harvard (1925)	
Thomas Gardiner Corcoran	1926	1927	Harvard (1926)	
Arthur E. Sutherland Jr.	1927	1928	Harvard (1925)	
John E. Lockwood	1928	1929	Harvard (1928)	
Alger Hiss	1929	1930	Harvard (1929)	none
Robert W. Wales	1930	1931	Harvard (1930)	
H. Chapman Rose	1931	1932	Harvard (1931)	
Donald Hiss	1932	1933	Harvard (1932)	
Mark DeWolfe Howe	1933	1934	Harvard (1933)	
James H. Rowe Jr.	1934	1935	Harvard (1934)	

Benjamin N. Cardozo

March 14, 1932 –
July 9, 1938

Clerk	Started	Finished	School (year)	Previous clerkship
Joseph M. Paley	1932	1932	Fordham (1921)	
Melvin H. Siegel	1932	1933	Harvard (1932)	
Ambrose Doskow	1933	1934	Columbia (1932)	Ainsworth (5th Cir.)
Alan M. Stroock	1934	1936	Yale (1934)	
Joseph L. Rauh Jr.	1936	July 9, 1938	Harvard (1935)	

Felix Frankfurter

January 30, 1939 –
August 28, 1962

Clerk	Started	Finished	School (year)	Previous clerkship
Joseph L. Rauh Jr.	January 30, 1939	1939	Harvard (1935)	Cardozo
Adrian S. Fisher	January 30, 1939	1940	Harvard (1937)	Brandeis
Edward F. Prichard Jr.	January 30, 1939	1940	Harvard (1938)	none
Philip L. Graham	1940	1941	Harvard (1939)	S. F. Reed
Philip Elman	1941	1943	Harvard (1939)	Magruder (1st Cir.)
Stanley M. Silverberg	1943	1944	Harvard (1942)	L. Hand (2d Cir.)
Harry K. Mansfield	1944	1945	Harvard (1943)	Edgerton (D.C. Cir.)
Philip B. Kurland	1945	1946	Harvard (1944)	J. Frank (2d Cir.)
Louis Henkin	1946	1947	Harvard (1940)	L. Hand (2d Cir.)
Irving J. Helman	1947	1948	Harvard (1942)	Magruder (1st Cir.)
Albert J. Rosenthal	1947	1948	Harvard (1941)	Magruder (1st Cir.)
William Thaddeus Coleman Jr.	1948	1949	Harvard (1946)	Goodrich (3d Cir.)
Elliot Richardson	1948	1949	Harvard (1947)	L. Hand (2d Cir.)
Albert M. Sacks	1949	1950	Harvard (1948)	A. Hand (2d Cir.)
Fred Norman Fishman	1949	1950	Harvard (1948)	A. Hand (2d Cir.)
Weaver White Dunnan	1950	1951	Harvard (1949)	A. Hand (2d Cir.)
Hugh Calkins	1950	1951	Harvard (1949)	L. Hand (2d Cir.)
Vincent L. McKusick	1951	1952	Harvard (1950)	L. Hand (2d Cir.)
Abram Chayes	1951	1952	Harvard (1949)	
Donald T. Trautman	1952	1953	Harvard (1951)	none
Alexander M. Bickel	1952	1953	Harvard (1952)	Magruder (1st Cir.)
Frank E.A. Sander	1953	1954	Harvard (1952)	Magruder (1st Cir.)
James Vorenberg	1953	1954	Harvard (1951)	none
Andrew L. Kaufman	1954	1957	Harvard (1954)	none
E. Barrett Prettyman Jr.	November 1954	1955	Virginia (1953)	R. H. Jackson
Matthew Gering Herold Jr.	1954	1955	Harvard (1952)	
Richard E. Sherwood	1954	1955	Harvard (1952)	
Harry H. Wellington	1955	1956	Harvard (1952)	Magruder (1st Cir.)
Jerome A. Cohen	1956	1957	Yale (1955)	Warren
John H. Mansfield	1957	1958	Yale (1955)	Traynor (California)
J. William Doolittle	1957	1958	Harvard (1954)	
Richard N. Goodwin	1958	1959	Harvard (1958)	none
Howard I. Kalodner	1958	1959	Harvard (1957)	J. Sloane (PA CP6)
Paul Bender	1959	1960	Harvard (1957)	L. Hand (2d Cir.)
Morton M. Winston	1959	1960	Harvard (1958)	
Anthony G. Amsterdam	1960	1961	Penn (1960)	none
John D. French	1960	1961	Harvard (1960)	none
Daniel K. Mayers	1960	1961	Harvard (1960)	none
Roland Stevens ("Robin") Homet Jr.	1961	1962	Harvard (1961)	
David P. Currie	1961	1962	Harvard (1960)	Friendly (2d Cir.)

Arthur Goldberg

October 1, 1962 –
July 25, 1965

Clerk	Started	Finished	School (year)	Previous clerkship
David B. Filvaroff (hired by Frankfurter)	1962	1963	Harvard (1958)	
Peter B. Edelman (hired by Frankfurter)	1962	1963	Harvard (1961)	Friendly (2d Cir.)
Alan M. Dershowitz	1963	1964	Yale (1962)	Bazelon (D.C. Cir.)
Lee B. McTurnan	1963	1964	Chicago (1963)	none
Stephen G. Breyer	1964	1965	Harvard (1964)	none
Stephen R. Goldstein	1964	1965	Penn (1962)	none

Abe Fortas

October 4, 1965 –
May 14, 1969

Clerk	Started	Finished	School (year)	Previous clerkship
John Griffiths	1965	1967	Yale (1965)	
Daniel P. Levitt	1965	1967	Harvard (1964)	Weinfeld (S.D.N.Y.)
H. David Rosenbloom	1967	1968	Harvard (1966)	none
Peter Zimroth	1967	1968	Yale (1966)	Bazelon (D.C. Cir.)
Martha Field (Alschuler) (Boudin)	1968	1969	Chicago (1968)	none
Walter B. Slocombe	1968	1969	Harvard (1968)	none

Harry Blackmun

June 9, 1970 –
August 3, 1994

Clerk	Started	Finished	School (year)	Previous clerkship
Daniel B. Edelman	1970	1971	Harvard (1969)	Blackmun (8th Cir.)
Robert E. Gooding Jr.	1970	1971	Michigan (1969)	Schaefer (Ill.)
Michel A. LaFond	1970	1972	American (1970)	none
George T. Frampton Jr.	1971	1972	Harvard (1969)	
John Townsend Rich	1971	1972	Yale (1969)	Bazelon (D.C. Cir.)
Randall P. Bezanson	1972	1973	Iowa (1971)	R. Robb (D.C. Cir.)
Ralph I. Miller	1972	1973	Texas (1972)	none
James W. Ziglar	1972	1973	GW (1972)	none
James J. Knicely	1973	1974	Harvard (1972)	R. Robb (D.C. Cir.)
Robert I. Richter	1973	1974	Chicago (1972)	I. Goldberg (5th Cir.)
Benjamin S. Sharp	1973	1974	Penn State (1973)	
Richard Blumenthal	1974	1975	Yale (1973)	Newman (D. Conn.)
Karen Nelson Moore	1974	1975	Harvard (1973)	Wilkey (D.C. Cir.)
David Allan Gates, III	1974	1975	Vanderbilt (1972)	Mehaffy (8th Cir.)
William H. Block	1975	1977	Chicago (1974)	McGowan (D.C. Cir.)
Donna M. Murasky	1975	1976	Chicago (1972)	(6th Cir.)
David C. Patterson	1975	1976	Harvard (1974)	McGowan (D.C. Cir.)
Richard A. Meserve	1976	1977	Harvard (1975)	Kaplan (Mass.)
Richard K. Willard	1976	1977	Harvard (1975)	A. Kennedy (9th Cir.)
Diane Wood	1976	1977	Texas (1975)	I. Goldberg (5th Cir.)
Keith P. Ellison	1977	1978	Yale (1976)	J. S. Wright (D.C. Cir.)
Michael S. Sundermeyer	1977	1978	Virginia (1976)	Wisdom (5th Cir.)
Ruth N. Glushien (Wedgwood)	1977	1978	Yale (1976)	Friendly (2d Cir.)
Charlotte Crane	1977	1978	Michigan (1976)	McCree (6th Cir.)
Albert G. Lauber	1978	1979	Yale (1977)	Wilkey (D.C. Cir.)
William A. McDaniel	1978	1979	Virginia (1977)	Seitz (3d Cir.)
Thomas W. Merrill	1978	1979	Chicago (1977)	Bazelon (D.C. Cir.)
Luther T. Munford	1978	1979	Virginia (1976)	Roney (5th Cir.)
Dan T. Coenen	1979	1980	Cornell (1978)	Haynsworth (4th Cir.)
Penda D. Hair	1979	1980	Harvard (1978)	Feinberg (2d Cir.)
William J. Murphy	1979	1980	Penn (1978)	Seitz (3d Cir.)
Mark C. Rahdert	1979	1980	Yale (1978)	Gurfein (2d Cir.)
James J. Brudney	1980	1981	Yale (1979)	Gesell (D.D.C.)
Susan G. Lahne	1980	1981	Virginia (1979)	Butzner (4th Cir.)
John P. Dean	1980	1981	Columbia (1979)	
Bruce C. Swartz	1980	1981	Yale (1979)	Feinberg (2d Cir.)
Frank S. Holleman III	1981	1982	Harvard (1979)	H. Winter (4th Cir.)
M. Kathleen ("Kit") Kinports	1981	1982	Penn (1980)	Mikva (D.C. Cir.)
Harold Hongju Koh	1981	1982	Harvard (1980)	Wilkey (D.C. Cir.)
Charles A. Rothfeld	1981	1982	Chicago (1980)	S. Robinson (D.C. Cir.)
Alan S. Madans	1982	1983	Duke (1981)	Oakes (2d Cir.)
David W. Ogden	1982	1983	Harvard (1981)	Sofaer (S.D.N.Y.)
Cory Streisinger	1982	1983	Stanford (1980)	B. Fletcher (9th Cir.)
David E. Van Zandt	1982	1983	Yale (1981)	Leval (S.D.N.Y.)
Richard A. Bartlett	1983	1984	Yale (1982)	Bazelon (D.C. Cir.)
Scott R. McIntosh	1983	1984	Harvard (1982)	S. Breyer (1st Cir.)
Elizabeth G. Taylor	1983	1984	Virginia (1982)	Coffin (1st Cir.)
Anna D. Kraus	1983	1984	Stanford (1982)	Choy (9th Cir.)
Vicki Been	1984	1985	NYU (1983)	Weinfeld (S.D.N.Y.)
Donald Francis Donovan	1984	1985	Stanford (1981)	Sofaer (S.D.N.Y.) / Farris (9th Cir.)
Mark D. Schneider	1984	1985	Columbia (1983)	Oakes (2d Cir.)
Robert A. Green	1984	1985	Georgetown (1983)	H. Edwards (D.C. Cir.)
Beth R. Heifetz	1985	1986	NYU (1983)	Mikva (D.C. Cir.)
Pamela S. Karlan	1985	1986	Yale (1984)	Sofaer (S.D.N.Y.)
Helane L. Morrison	1985	1986	Berkeley (1984)	Posner (7th Cir.)
David A. Sklansky	1985	1986	Harvard (1984)	Mikva (D.C. Cir.)
Beth S. Brinkmann	1986	1987	Yale (1985)	Kravitch (11th Cir.)
Ellen E. Deason	1986	1987	Michigan (1985)	H. Edwards (D.C. Cir.)
Chai Feldblum	1986	1987	Harvard (1985)	Coffin (1st Cir.)
Emily Buss	1987	1988	Yale (1986)	L. Pollak (E.D. Pa.)
Ann M. Kappler	1987	1988	NYU (1986)	Mikva (D.C. Cir.)
Danny Ertel	1987	1988	Harvard (1986)	Wald (D.C. Cir.)
Alan C. Michaels	1987	1988	Columbia (1986)	Feinberg (2d Cir.)
Edward B. Foley	1988	1989	Columbia (1986)	P. Wald (D.C. Cir.)
Kevin M. Kearney	1988	1989	Emory (1987)	J. Oakes (2d Cir.)
Edward Lazarus	1988	1989	Yale (1987)	W. Norris (9th Cir.)
Deborah C. Malamud	1988	1989	Chicago (1986)	L. Pollak (E.D. Pa.)
Vikram D. Amar	1989	1990	Yale (1988)	W. Norris (9th Cir.)
Anne P. Dupre	1989	1990	Georgia (1988)	Edmondson (11th Cir.)
Martha A. Matthews	1989	1990	Berkeley (1987)	S. Breyer (1st Cir.)
Malcolm L. Stewart	1989	1990	Yale (1988)	Wald (D.C. Circuit)
Ann Alpers	1990	1991	Stanford (1989)	W. Norris (9th Cir.)
Lynn E. Blais	1990	1991	Harvard (1988)	Justice (E.D. Tex.)
Michael A. Conley	1990	1991	Boston University (1989)	Mikva (D.C. Cir.)
Alan Jenkins	1990	1991	Harvard (1989)	R. Carter (S.D.N.Y.)
Jeffrey A. Meyer	1991	1992	Yale (1991)	Oakes (2d Cir.)
Stephanie A.J. Dangel	1991	1992	Yale (1991)	Leval (S.D.N.Y.)
Molly McUsic	1991	1992	Harvard (1989)	D. W. Nelson (9th Cir.)
Andrea Nervi Ward	1991	1992	Chicago (1990)	Mikva (D.C. Cir.)
Hugh W. Baxter (shared with Brennan)	1993	1994	Stanford (1990)	R.B. Ginsburg (D.C. Cir.)
Sherry F. Colb	1992	1993	Harvard (1991)	Feinberg (2d Cir.)
William S. Dodge	1992	1993	Yale (1991)	W. Norris (9th Cir.)
Geoffrey M. Klineberg	1992	1993	Yale (1990)	Wald (D.C. Cir.) / Cabranes (D. Conn.)
Andrew H. Schapiro	1992	1993	Harvard (1990)	Posner (7th Cir.)
Radhika Rao (shared with Marshall)	1992	1993	Harvard (1990)	Cudahy (7th Cir.)
Michelle L. Alexander	1993	1994	Stanford (1992)	Mikva (D.C. Cir.)
Sarah H. Cleveland	1993	1994	Yale (1992)	Oberdorfer (D.D.C.)
Ann Hubbard (Bilionis)	1993	1994	Duke (1992)	Wald (D.C. Cir.)
J. Paul Oetken	1993	1994	Yale (1991)	Cudahy (7th Cir.) / Oberdorfer (D.D.C.)
Paul H. Schwartz (shared with Breyer)	1994	1995	North Carolina (1992)	Kravitch (11th Cir.)
Michael J. Wishnie (shared with Breyer)	1995	1996	Yale (1993)	Sarokin (3d Cir.)
Cecillia D. Wang (shared with Breyer)	1996	1997	Yale (1995)	W. Norris (9th Cir.)
Laura A. Dickinson (shared with Breyer)	1997	1998	Yale (1996)	D. W. Nelson (9th Cir.)
Clare Huntington (shared with Breyer)	1998	1999	Columbia (1996)	Garland (D.C. Cir.) / Cote (S.D.N.Y.)

Stephen Breyer

August 3, 1994 –
June 30, 2022

Clerk	Started	Finished	School (year)	Previous clerkship
Henk J. Brands	1994	1995	Columbia (1990)	Souter / S. Breyer (1st Cir.)
Lisa Schultz (Bressman)	1994	1995	Chicago (1993)	Cabranes (D. Conn.)
Deanne E. Maynard	1994	1995	Harvard (1991)	Powell / S. Harris (D.D.C.)
Jonathan T. Molot	1994	1995	Harvard (1992)	S. Breyer (1st Cir.)
Paul H. Schwartz (shared with Blackmun)	1994	1995	North Carolina (1992)	Kravitch (11th Cir.)
Yochai Benkler	1995	1996	Harvard (1994)	none
Jennifer Gillian Newstead	1995	1996	Yale (1994)	Silberman (D.C. Cir.)
Kevin K. Russell	1995	1996	Yale (1994)	W. Norris (9th Cir.)
Michael J. Wishnie (shared with Blackmun)	1995	1996	Yale (1993)	Sarokin (3d Cir.)
Neal K. Katyal	1996	1997	Yale (1995)	Calabresi (2d Cir.)
Robin Ann Lenhardt (Crawley)	1996	1997	Harvard (1995)	Bownes (1st Cir.)
Aaron M. Panner	1996	1997	Harvard (1995)	Boudin (1st Cir.)
Carolyn Shapiro	1996	1997	Chicago (1995)	Posner (7th Cir.)
Cecillia D. Wang (shared with Blackmun)	1996	1997	Yale (1995)	W. Norris (9th Cir.)
Rachel A. Harmon	1997	1998	Yale (1996)	Calabresi (2d Cir.)
Charles C. Moore	1997	1998	Stanford (1995)	Tatel (D.C. Cir.)
Theodore W. Ruger	1997	1998	Harvard (1995)	Boudin (1st Cir.)
Caitlin Halligan	1997	1998	Georgetown (1995)	Wald (D.C. Cir.)
Laura A. Dickinson (shared with Blackmun)	1997	1998	Yale (1996)	D. W. Nelson (9th Cir.)
Linda T. Coberly	1998	1999	Michigan (1995)	D. Ginsburg (D.C. Cir.)
Robert N. Hochman	1998	1999	Chicago (1997)	Posner (7th Cir.)
Jenny Martínez	1998	1999	Harvard (1997)	Calabresi (2d Cir.)
Colin S. Stretch	1998	1999	Harvard (1996)	Silberman (D.C. Cir.)
Clare Huntington (shared with Blackmun)	1998	1999	Columbia (1996)	Garland (D.C. Cir.) / Cote (S.D.N.Y.)
Erin Glenn (Busby)	1999	2000	Harvard (1998)	Boudin (1st Cir.)
Marc E. Isserles	1999	2000	Harvard (1998)	Silberman (D.C. Cir.)
Ketanji Brown Jackson	1999	2000	Harvard (1996)	Selya (1st Cir.) / Saris (D. Mass.)
Tim Wu	1999	2000	Harvard (1998)	Posner (7th Cir.)
Danielle M. Spinelli	2000	2001	Harvard (1999)	Calabresi (2d Cir.)
Stacey M. Leyton	2000	2001	Stanford (1998)	Reinhardt (9th Cir.) / Illston (N.D. Cal.)
Russell K. Robinson	2000	2001	Harvard (1998)	D. W. Nelson (9th Cir.)
Alexander A. Reinert	2000	2001	NYU (1999)	H. Edwards (D.C. Cir.)
Vince Chhabria	2001	2002	Berkeley (1998)	Browning (9th Cir.) / C. Breyer (N.D. Cal.)
Risa L. Goluboff	2001	2002	Yale (2000)	Calabresi (2d Cir.)
Mirah A. Horowitz	2001	2002	Duke (2000)	Wardlaw (9th Cir.)
Michael E. Leiter	2001	2002	Harvard (2000)	Boudin (1st Cir.)
Priya R. Aiyar	2002	2003	Yale (2001)	Garland (D.C. Cir.)
John M. Golden	2002	2003	Harvard (2000)	Boudin (1st Cir.)
Maritza U.B. Okata	2002	2003	Yale (2000)	Calabresi (2d Cir.)
Anne K. Small	2002	2003	Harvard (2001)	Calabresi (2d Cir.)
Ariela M. Migdal	2003	2004	NYU (2001)	H. Edwards (D.C. Cir.)
Pratik A. Shah	2003	2004	Berkeley (2001)	W. Fletcher (9th Cir.)
Alexandra M. Walsh	2003	2004	Stanford (2001)	Garland (D.C. Cir.)
Davis J. Wang	2003	2004	Harvard (2002)	Boudin (1st Cir.)
Christina Duffy-Ponsa (Burnett)	2004	2005	Yale (1998)	Cabranes (2d Cir.)
James P. Dowden	2004	2005	Boston College (2000)	Scirica (3d Cir.)
Aimee Athena Feinberg	2004	2005	Stanford (2002)	Tatel (D.C. Cir.)
Jacob J. Sullivan	2004	2005	Yale (2003)	Calabresi (2d Cir.)
Danielle C. Gray	2005	2006	Harvard (2003)	Garland (D.C. Cir.)
Kathryn E. Judge	2005	2006	Stanford (2004)	Posner (7th Cir.)
Jonathan Kravis	2005	2006	Yale (2004)	Garland (D.C. Cir.)
John H. Longwell	2005	2006	Georgia (1999)	D. Ginsburg (D.C. Cir.) / V. Walker (N.D. Cal.)
Jaren Elizabeth Casazza (Janghorbani)	2006	2007	Columbia (2004)	Jacobs (2d Cir.) / K. Wood (S.D.N.Y.)
Tacy F. Flint	2006	2007	Chicago (2004)	Posner (7th Cir.)
Stephen L. Shackelford Jr.	2006	2007	Harvard (2005)	Boudin (1st Cir.)
Thiruvendran Vignarajah	2006	2007	Harvard (2005)	Calabresi (2d Cir.)
Justin Driver (shared with O'Connor)	2006	2007	Harvard (2004)	Garland (D.C. Cir.)
Michael S. Bosworth	2007	2008	Yale (2003)	Katzmann (2d Cir.) / Rakoff (S.D.N.Y.)
Karen L. Dunn (Netter)	2007	2008	Yale (2006)	Garland (D.C. Cir.)
Eric J. Feigin	2007	2008	Stanford (2005)	Wilkinson (4th Cir.)
Philippa Milane Scarlett	2007	2008	Columbia (2003)	A. Williams (7th Cir.)
Brianne J. Gorod	2008	2009	Yale (2005)	Katzmann (2d Cir.) / Rakoff (S.D.N.Y.)
Seth Grossman	2008	2009	Yale (2005)	Calabresi (2d Cir.) / Reinhardt (9th Cir.)
Aileen M. McGrath	2008	2009	Harvard (2007)	Boudin (1st Cir.)
Matthew E. Price	2008	2009	Harvard (2006)	Boudin (1st Cir.)
Andrew Manuel Crespo	2009	2010	Harvard (2008)	Reinhardt (9th Cir.)
Bessie N. Dewar	2009	2010	Yale (2006)	W. Fletcher (9th Cir.) / L. Pollak (E.D. Pa.)
Chris Fonzone	2009	2010	Harvard (2007)	Wilkinson (4th Cir.)
Jennifer H.J. Nou	2009	2010	Yale (2008)	Posner (7th Cir.)
Thomas G. Pulham (shared with Souter)	2009	2010	Yale (2004)	Katzmann (2d Cir.) / Cote (S.D.N.Y.)
Erika L. Myers	2010	2011	Stanford (2008)	Kozinski (9th Cir.)
Brian D. Netter	2010	2011	Yale (2006)	J. A. W. Rogers (D.C. Cir.)
Natalie R. Ram	2010	2011	Yale (2008)	Calabresi (2d Cir.)
David M. Zionts	2010	2011	Harvard (2008)	Garland (D.C. Cir.)
Brook Hopkins (shared with Souter)	2010	2011	Harvard (2007)	Reinhardt (9th Cir.)
Rachel Bloomekatz	2011	2012	UCLA (2008)	Calabresi (2d Cir.) / Marshall (Mass.)
Jonathan A. Bressler	2011	2012	Harvard (2010)	Boudin (1st Cir.)
Andrew F. Dawson	2011	2012	Stanford (2008)	W. Fletcher (9th Cir.) / C. Breyer (N.D. Cal.)
Rebecca A. Stone	2011	2012	NYU (2009)	Posner (7th Cir.)
Kwaku Akowuah	2012	2013	Harvard (2004)	Katzmann (2d Cir.) / Garaufis (E.D.N.Y.)
Emily Rebecca Gantt	2012	2013	Virginia (2011)	Boudin (1st Cir.)
Joshua A. Geltzer	2012	2013	Yale (2011)	Kozinski (9th Cir.)
Susannah Landes (Weaver)	2012	2013	Georgetown (2008)	Katzmann (2d Cir.) / H. Kennedy (D.D.C.)
Anthony W. Vitarelli (shared with Souter)	2012	2013	Yale (2009)	Griffith (D.C. Cir.)
Mark C. Savignac	2013	2014	Harvard (2011)	Posner (7th Cir.) / Feinerman (N.D. Ill.)
Thomas P. Schmidt	2013	2014	Yale (2011)	Garland (D.C. Cir.)
Julia Fong Sheketoff	2013	2014	NYU (2010)	Sentelle (D.C. Cir.) / Gleeson (E.D.N.Y.)
Sara Aronchick Solow	2013	2014	Yale (2011)	Scirica (3d Cir.) / Baylson (E.D. Pa.)
Julia A. Malkina (shared with O'Connor)	2013	2014	Yale (2011)	Kavanaugh (D.C. Cir.)
Ilana B. Gelfman	2014	2015	Yale (2009)	Katzmann (2d Cir.) / Woodlock (D. Mass.)
Michael Gervais	2014	2015	Yale (2011)	Kozinski (9th Cir.)
Aaron William Scherzer	2014	2015	Yale (2010)	Reinhardt (9th Cir.) / Rakoff (S.D.N.Y.)
Kendall Kelly Alexis Turner	2014	2015	Stanford (2013)	Garland (D.C. Cir.)
Arpit K. Garg (shared with Souter)	2014	2015	Yale (2012)	Reinhardt (9th Cir.) / Cote (S.D.N.Y.)
Galen B. Bascom	2015	2016	Virginia (2013)	Garland (D.C. Cir.)
Tejas N. Narechania	2015	2016	Columbia (2011)	Wood (7th Cir.)
Aaron D. Pennekamp	2015	2016	Georgetown (2013)	Sutton (6th Cir.) / Bates (D.D.C.)
Farah Peterson	2015	2016	Yale (2012)	Calabresi (2d Cir.)
Denise L. Drake	2016	2017	Stanford (2013)	P. Higginbotham (5th Cir.) / C. Breyer (N.D. Cal.)
Daniel E. Herz-Roiphe	2016	2017	Yale (2015)	Garland (D.C. Cir.)
Brian M. Richardson	2016	2017	Yale (2011)	Rakoff (S.D.N.Y.) / Katzmann (2d Cir.)
Rachel G. Shalev	2016	2017	Yale (2014)	B. Fletcher (9th Cir.) / Pillard (D.C. Cir.)
Edwina B. Clarke (shared with Souter)	2016	2017	Yale (2013)	Reinhardt (9th Cir.) / Oetken (S.D.N.Y.) / Barron (1st Cir.)
Cynthia Anne ("Cyndi") Barmore	2017	2018	Stanford (2015)	Griffith (D.C. Cir.)
Margaret "Maggie" Goodlander	2017	2018	Yale (2016)	Garland (D.C. Cir.)
David R. Fox	2017	2018	GW (2012)	Barron (1st Cir.)
Carlton E. Forbes	2017	2018	Yale (2014)	Lohier (2d Cir.) / Pillard (D.C. Cir.)
William Ernest Havemann	2018	2019	Stanford (2013)	D. Motz (4th Cir.)
Jo-Ann Tamila Karhson	2018	2019	Harvard (2014)	K.B. Jackson (D.D.C.) / Kavanaugh (D.C. Cir.)
Janine Marie Lopez	2018	2019	Harvard (2014)	Garland (D.C. Cir.)
Alec Warren Schierenbeck	2018	2019	Stanford (2015)	Oetken (S.D.N.Y.) / Tatel (D.C. Cir.)
Nicholas Robert Rosellini	2019	2020	Stanford (2016)	C. Breyer (N.D. Cal.) / Friedland (9th Cir.) / Cuéllar (Cal.)
Celia R. Choy	2019	2020	Yale (2012)	Rakoff (S.D.N.Y.) / Katzmann (2d Cir.)
Dahlia ("Dila") Mignouna	2019	2020	Yale (2016)	Srinivasan (D.C. Cir.)
Eugene A. Sokoloff	2019	2020	Yale (2012)	Sack (2d Cir.)
Emily J. Barnet	2020	2021	Yale (2015)	Rakoff (S.D.N.Y.) / Katzmann (2d Cir.)
Arjun Ramamurti	2020	2021	Yale (2018)	Garland (D.C. Cir.) / Pillard (D.C. Cir.)
Daniel J. Richardson	2020	2021	Virginia (2018)	Wilkinson (4th Cir.)
Brittany Jones-Record (hired by Ginsburg)	2020	2021	Stanford (2016)	Sutton (6th Cir.) / Millett (D.C. Cir.)
David Scott Louk (hired by Ginsburg)	2020	2021	Yale (2015)	Boasberg (D.D.C.) / Katzmann (2d Cir.)
Diana Li Kim	2020	June 30, 2022	Yale (2017)	Hall (D. Conn.) / Calabresi (2d Cir.)
Elizabeth B. Deutsch	2021	June 30, 2022	Yale (2016)	Pillard (D.C. Cir.) / Oetken (S.D.N.Y.)
Erika K. Hoglund	2021	June 30, 2022	Stanford (2019)	S. Thomas (9th Cir.) / Chhabria (N.D. Cal.)
Joel F. Wacks	2021	June 30, 2022	Chicago (2018)	McKeown (9th Cir.) / C. Breyer (N.D. Cal.)
Kyle T. Edwards (shared with Jackson)	2022	2023	Yale (2018)	Kruger (Cal.) / Lohier (2d Cir.)
Frank ("Cody") Kahoe III	2023	2024	Stanford (2021)	Berzon (9th Cir.) / Cooper (D.D.C.)
Steffi Ostrowski	2024	2025	Yale (2021)	Chhabria (N.D. Cal.) / Friedland (9th Cir.)
Sierra Polston	2025	2026	Harvard (2023)	Kovner (E.D.N.Y.) / Scudder (7th Cir.)

Ketanji Brown Jackson

June 30, 2022 –
Incumbent

Clerk	Started	Finished	School (year)	Previous clerkship
Claire Madill	2022	2023	Michigan (2015)	Fletcher (9th Cir.) / Nathan (S.D.N.Y.)
Kerrel Murray	2022	2023	Stanford (2014)	Tymkovich (10th Cir.) / K.B. Jackson (D.D.C.)
Michael Qian	2022	2023	Stanford (2016)	Garland (D.C. Cir.) / R.B. Ginsburg
Natalie Salmanowitz	2022	2023	Harvard (2019)	Watford (9th Cir.) / K.B. Jackson (D.D.C.)
Kyle T. Edwards (shared with Breyer)	2022	2023	Yale (2018)	Kruger (Cal.) / Lohier (2d Cir.)
John He	2023	2024	Michigan (2018)	Berzon (9th Cir.) / Stein (S.D.N.Y.)
Michaeljit Sandhu	2023	2024	Harvard (2021)	Cuéllar (Cal.) / Kruger (Cal.) / Koh (9th Cir.)
Rebecca Steinberg	2023	2024	Yale (2020)	Moore (6th Cir.) / Ellison (S.D.Tex.)
Victoria Stilwell	2023	2024	Yale (2019)	Fletcher (9th Cir.)
Katharine Janes	2024	2025	Virginia (2021)	Sack (2d Cir.)
Joseph R. Landry	2024	2025	Columbia (2016)	Loken (8th Cir.) / Talwani (D. Mass.)
Nicolas "Nic" Riley	2024	2025	Yale (2011)	(S. Thomas (9th Cir.) / Wilken (N.D. Cal) / Talwani (D. Mass.)
Donovan Stone	2024	2025	Duke (2020)	Kallon (N.D. Ala.) / Stewart (5th Cir.)
Cal Barnett-Mayotte	2025	2026	Penn (2022)	Harris (4th Cir.) / Bates (D.D.C.)
Jenny Choi	2025	2026	Yale (2021)	Lohier (2d Cir.) / Furman (S.D.N.Y.)
Maia M. Cole	2025	2026	NYU (2020)	Furman (S.D.N.Y.) / Lohier (2d Cir.)
Gabrielle Dohmen	2025	2026	Chicago (2023)	Chhabria (N.D. Cal.) / Srinivasan (D.C. Cir.)
Nena Benavides	2026		Chicago (2022)	Feinerman (N.D. Ill.) / Kennelly (N.D. Ill.) / Friedland (9th Cir.)
Juliana Chang	2026		Harvard (2024)	Calabresi (2d Cir.) / Boasberg (D.D.C.)
Ian Miller	2026		Columbia (2020)	Sack (2d Cir.) / Furman (S.D.N.Y.)
Darryl E. Williams, Jr.	2026		Howard (2022)	Nachmanoff (E.D. Va.) / Heytens (4th Cir.)

== Additional sources ==
- Baier, Paul R. (1973). "The Law Clerks: Profile of an Institution," Vanderbilt L. Rev. 26: 1125–77.
- "Finding Aid to the Papers of Harry A. Blackmun," Library of Congress (2003, rev'd April 2010), list of clerks.
- "Georgia Law Alumni Who Have Clerked for a U.S. Supreme Court Justice," Advocate, Spring/Summer 2004 (listing 6 names).
- Judicial Clerkship Handbook, USC Gould Law School, 2013-2014, p. 33, Appendix B.
- Newland, Charles A. (June 1961). "Personal Assistants to the Supreme Court Justices: The Law Clerks," Oregon L. Rev. 40: 306–07.
- News of Supreme Court clerks. University of Virginia Law School, list of clerks, 2004-2018.
- University of Michigan clerks to the Supreme Court, 1991-2017, University of Michigan Law School Web site (2016). Retrieved September 20, 2016.
- Rauh, Joseph L., Jr. (1979), et al., "A Personal View of Justice Benjamin N. Cardozo: Recollections of Four Cardozo Law Clerks," 1 Cardozo L. Rev. 5.
- Ward, Artemus and David L. Weiden (2006). Sorcerers' Apprentices: 100 Years of Law Clerks at the United States Supreme Court. New York, NY: New York University Press. ISBN 978-0-8147-9420-3, ISBN 978-0-8147-9420-3.
