= Keker, Van Nest & Peters =

American law firm

Keker, Van Nest & Peters LLP
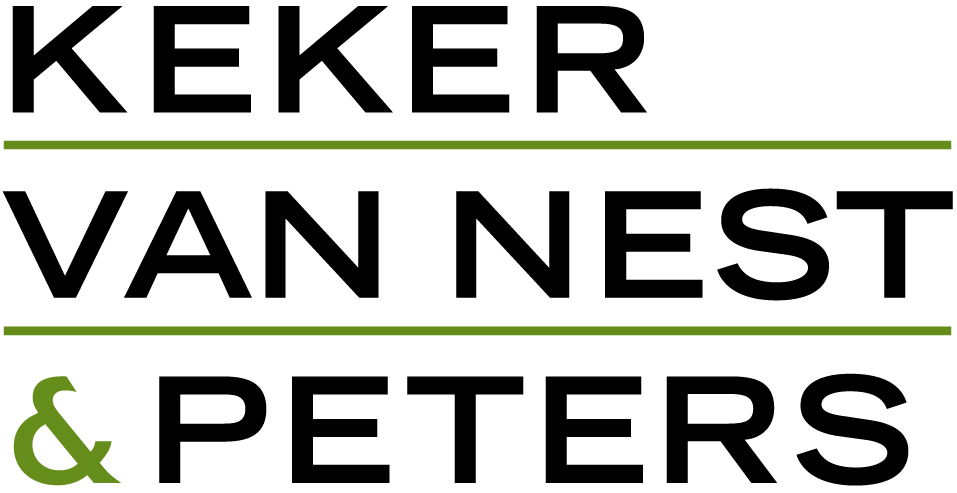
- Headquarters: San Francisco, California
- No. of offices: 1
- No. of attorneys: 135 as of July 2025
- Major practice areas: Litigation
- Key people: Laurie Mims, Managing Partner
- Date founded: 1978
- Founder: John W. Keker and William A. Brockett, Jr.
- Company type: Limited liability partnership
- Website: www.keker.com

Keker, Van Nest & Peters LLP is an American boutique law firm located in San Francisco, California, founded in 1978. The firm's areas of practice include intellectual property, professional liability, class actions, wrongful termination defense, general contract and commercial litigation, antitrust, white collar crime, and appellate.

== History ==
The firm was founded as Keker & Brockett in 1978 by Yale Law School colleagues John Keker and William A. Brockett Jr. The firm was renamed Keker, Brockett & Van Nest in 1992, and then Keker & Van Nest in 1994, reflecting first the addition of Robert Van Nest to the firm's leadership, and then the departure of founding partner Bill Brockett. Partner Elliot Peters was added to the firm's name in January 2017.

== Cases ==
In United States Department of Justice v. McKesson Corporation. Keker & Van Nest defeated the government's six-year False Claims Act case against McKesson Corporation and one of its subsidiaries. The government had sought nearly a billion dollars in penalties and damages based on allegations that a McKesson subsidiary submitted "legally false" Medicare insurance reimbursement claims by violating Medicare supplier standards and charging less than fair-market value for billing services in exchange for product sales. In early 2010, Hon. Sharion Aycock dismissed the Qui Tam Relator who initiated this case, the Fifth Circuit affirmed the decision on appeal. In March 2011, Keker & Van Nest won summary adjudication on all claims relating to alleged violations of Medicare supplier standards. After a three-week bench trial, the court granted judgment in defendants’ favor.

In Oracle Corporation v. Google, Inc. Keker & Van Nest represented Google in a patent and copyright infringement trial brought by the Oracle Corporation, billed as the "smartphone trial of the century." The case was a battle between two of Silicon Valley's most respected and powerful companies in which Oracle initially sought nearly $6 billion in damages and an injunction forcing Google to change the way it used and distributed the popular Android operating system, which powers more than 300 million smartphones and tablet computers. Following repeated rounds of motions and briefing, the judge dismissed the bulk of Oracle's copyright claims, and at trial the jury rendered a unanimous verdict rejecting all claims of patent infringement. Although the jury decided that Google infringed on Oracle copyright on nine out of millions of lines of source code, the case is considered a sweeping victory for Google, with zero damages.

In State of New York v. Intel Corporation, Keker & Van Nest was lead trial counsel for Intel Corporation in an antitrust case. The New York Attorney General claimed Intel violated federal and state antitrust statutes by maintaining an illegal monopoly in the microprocessor market. Keker won several key motions near the start of trial that severely limited the scope of New York's case. The matter settled shortly thereafter with a payment by Intel of only $6.5 million in partial repayment of some of New York's costs.

In Securities and Exchange Commission v. Brian Stoker, Keker & Van Nest defended former Citigroup executive Brian Stoker in one of the rare financial crisis cases to go to trial. Stoker, who worked on the structuring desk at Citigroup, was charged with securities fraud in connection with Citigroup’s 2007 marketing of a $1 billion collateralized debt obligation (CDO) backed by assets tied to the housing market. After a two-week jury trial in the Southern District of New York with Judge Rakoff presiding, the federal jury rejected the SEC’s case and found Mr. Stoker not liable on any of the SEC’s claims.

In VS Technologies LLC v. Twitter Inc., by winning a defense verdict in this federal jury trial, Keker & Van Nest protected Twitter Inc. from a patent infringement suit and a $40 million damages claim.

In Taiwan Semiconductor Manufacturing Company v. Semiconductor Manufacturing International Corporation, the law firm represented the world's leading semiconductor foundry TSMC against China's leading semiconductor manufacturer SMIC in the largest trade secret misuse case ever tried in which SMIC faced a damages claim of $2 billion. Following a jury verdict in favor of TSMC, TSMC settled with SMIC.

In United States Department of Justice v. Major League Baseball Players Association, the firm represented the Major League Baseball Players Association in a high-profile battle with the U.S. government. In August 2009, an en banc panel of the United States Court of Appeals for the Ninth Circuit ruled that the federal investigators unlawfully seized drug-testing records of more than 100 athletes. In September 2010, the court issued a revised opinion that upheld its ruling.

In Apple Inc. v. HTC Corporation, Keker & Van Nest served as lead counsel for HTC in its battle with Apple over smartphone technology. Apple first sued HTC in district court and before the United States International Trade Commission (ITC), claiming HTC had infringed on 20 patents related to various computer-related technologies, including user interfaces, operating systems, power management and digital sign processing. The ITC hearing that went to decision resulting in a favorable ruling, and HTC obtained a settlement to become the first Android handset maker licensed by Apple.

In Commonwealth Scientific and Industrial Research Organisation v. Semiconductor Company, the firm represented a semiconductor company in a case where CSIRO asserted patent infringement claims against more than a dozen of the world's leading technology companies. CSIRO contended the defendants' Wi-Fi products infringed on CSIRO's patent, and sought nine to ten figure royalty payments. All parties settled a week into the jury trial.

In John J. Tennison v. City and County of San Francisco, the firm represented John Tennison in his habeas corpus case where it was discovered that exculpatory evidence hidden by the police which proved Mr. Tennison's innocence-including a taped confession by another man. A civil rights claim was brought against the City and County of San Francisco, the police and prosecutor responsible for the wrongful conviction. The civil rights case was settled for $4.6 million. According to the San Francisco Chronicle, it was the largest amount the city has ever paid to a wrongly convicted person.

In U.S. v. Swartz, Elliot Peters defended open access activist Aaron Swartz.

== Pro bono work ==
In 2014, Jon Streeter, Sharif Jacob and Benita Brahmbhatt secured the release of Roy Butler, who served 13 years beyond his base term. Butler’s case caused California to reform its parole system.

In 2014, Elliot Peters and Jo Golub were named Pro Bono Attorneys of the Year by California Lawyer for their work with the Northern California Innocence Project at the Santa Clara University School of Law exonerated Ronald Ross of attempted murder charge after serving nearly 7 years of his 25-to-life sentence.

In 2012, Dan Purcell and Eric MacMichael were named California Lawyer "Attorney of the Year" in the area of pro bono. They dedicated five years to exonerating Caramad Conley, a man who was wrongfully convicted of a double homicide and spent 18 years in prison. The conviction was overturned as a result of uncovering prosecutorial and police misconduct.

== Notable alumni ==
- James Boasberg
- Rob Bonta
- Vince Chhabria
- Eumi K. Lee
- Michelle K. Lee
- Mark Lemley
- Ismail Ramsey
- Jon S. Tigar
- Zachary Bookman
- Cecilia Wang
