= Laura Dickinson =

Laura Dickinson may refer to:

- Laura Elsie Dickinson, American actress and musician
- Laura A. Dickinson, professor of law
- Laura Dickinson (died 2006), student at Eastern Michigan University, see Murder of Laura Dickinson
