= 321 Studios v. Metro Goldwyn Mayer Studios, Inc. =

US legal case concerning intellectual property

- Court: United States District Court for the Northern District of California
- Full case name: 321 Studios, Plaintiffs, v. Metro Goldwyn Mayer Studios Inc., Defendants.
- Decided: February 19, 2004
- Docket nos.: 3:02-cv-01955
- Citation: 307 F. Supp. 2d 1085 (2004)

Holding
- both of DVD Copy Plus and DVD-X Copy violated the DMCA and that the DMCA was not unconstitutional. 321 Studios was enjoined from manufacturing, distributing, or otherwise trafficking in any type of DVD circumvention software.

Court membership
- Judge sitting: Susan Illston

Keywords
- DVD ripping software, DMCA

321 Studios v. Metro Goldwyn Mayer Studios, Inc., 307 F. Supp. 2d 1085 (N.D. Cal. 2004), is a district court case brought by 321 Studios seeking declaratory judgment from the court that their DVD ripping software, i.e. DVD Copy Plus and DVD X Copy, do not violate the provisions of the Digital Millennium Copyright Act ("DMCA"), or, in the alternative, that the DMCA is unconstitutional because Congress exceeded its enumerated powers, these provisions are unconstitutionally vague and/or violate the First Amendment.

The District Court for the Northern District of California rejected 321 Studios' claims for declaratory relief, holding that both DVD Copy Plus and DVD-X Copy violated the DMCA and that the DMCA was not unconstitutional. Simultaneously, the court granted an injunction to enjoin 321 Studios from manufacturing, distributing, or otherwise trafficking in any type of DVD circumvention software.

== Background ==
=== Plaintiff ===
321 Studios was a private company that marketed and sold software and instructions for copying DVDs. DVD Copy Plus consisted of an electronic guide explaining how to create backup copies of DVDs, two pieces of free, publicly available software, and a CD burning application. This software allowed users to copy portions of DVDs onto CDs regardless of whether they were encoded using Content Scramble System ("CSS"). DVD X Copy created backup copies of DVDs onto a user's computer that could then be burned to a DVD. DVD X Copy used a CSS key to access the data if a DVD was encoded with CDD.

=== Defendants ===
The defendants were mostly made up of members of the Motion Picture Association of America ("MPAA"). As a result of the claim of unconstitutionality, the United States joined the suit as an intervening defendant.

=== Claims ===
The plaintiff filed a complaint including two claims:

1. Claim One is a declaratory judgment that the distribution of DVD Copy Plus and DVD-X COPY do not violate the provisions of the DMCA or, in the alternative, that these provisions of DMCA are invalid because Congress exceeded its enumerated powers, these provisions are unconstitutionally vague, and/or these provisions violate the First Amendment of the Constitution.

2. Claim Two seeks another declaratory judgment that the distribution of DVD Copy Plus and DVD-X COPY do not violate the Copyright Act on the grounds that they have substantial non-infringing uses, that the use of these software constitute fair use, and/or that the relevant provisions of the Copyright Act, if interpreted to bar the distribution of DVD Copy Plus and DVD-X COPY, violate the First Amendment.

The court's analysis in the decision did not reach the Copyright violation issue, but directly rejected 321 Studios's claims and granted the injunction based on the DMCA provisions.

=== Issues ===
The litigation solved mainly two issues. First, whether or not 321 Studios was liable under sections 1201(a)(2) and 1201(b)(1) of the DMCA. Section 1201(a)(2) of the DMCA prohibits the "manufacture, import, offer to the public, provide, or otherwise traffic in any technology, product, service, device, or part thereof, that" is primarily designed or produced for purposes of circumventing a technological protection measure that controls access to a copyrighted work. Section 1201(b)(1) prohibits the same for technological protection measures that effectively protects an exclusive right of a copyright owner.

The second issue concerns whether or not the DMCA, as construed by members of the MPAA, is unconstitutionally void. 321 Studios argued that the DMCA is invalid, because (1) the DMCA in this context restricted 321 Studios' free speech protected under the First Amendment, (2) the DMCA impermissibly burden the fair use rights of the end users, and (3) the DMCA exceeded the scope of congressional powers.

== Court's Holding ==
The court held that both of DVD Copy Plus and DVD-X Copy violated the DMCA and that the DMCA was not unconstitutional. The court enjoined 321 Studios from manufacturing, distributing, or otherwise trafficking in any type of DVD circumvention software.

== Court's Rationale ==
=== DMCA Violations ===
==== 1201(a)(2) Liability ====
The court found that, because 321 Studios' DVD copying software circumvented CSS, a technological protection measure that effectively controls access to the DVDs, because the software had only limited commercially significant purpose or use other than to circumvent CSS, and because it was marketed for use in circumventing CSS, the court would not grant declaratory relief to 321 Studios on the 1201(a)(2) claim. 321 Studios argued that because the owner of a DVD has the authority of the copyright holder to access the DVD, they have the authority of the copyright owner and so cannot be liable under 1201(a)(2). The court rejected this argument using the reasoning put forth by the Second Circuit in Universal Studios v. Corley, arguing the "basic flaw in this argument is that it misreads subsection § 1201(a)(3)(A). That provision exempts from liability those who would `decrypt' an encrypted DVD with the authority of a copyright owner, not those who would `view' a DVD with the authority of a copyright owner."

321 Studios also argued that if their software was a violation, then all DVD players must necessarily be a violation because they also decrypt CSS. The court rejected this argument as well, stating that the difference between 321 Studios and the manufacturer of a DVD player is that the manufacturer has been given a specific CSS key subject to strict use restrictions.

==== 1201(b)(1) Liability ====
The court found that, because 321 Studios' DVD copying software circumvented CSS, a technological protection measure that effectively controls the copying of DVDs, because the software had only limited commercially significant purpose or use other than to circumvent CSS, and because it was marketed for use in circumventing CSS, the court would not grant declaratory relief to 321 Studios on the 1201(b)(1) claim. 321 argued that CSS does not actually control copying from the DVD, it only controls access. The court dismissed this argument, stating "while 321 is technically correct that CSS controls access to decrypted DVDs, the purpose of this access control is to control copying of those DVDs, since encrypted DVDs cannot be copied unless they are accessed."

321 Studios also argued that their software did not violate 1201(b)(1) because many uses of the software were legitimate uses sanctioned by copyright law, such as accessing public domain DVDs or DVDs without CSS, making a fair use of DVD content, or making a single archival copy. The court dismisses this argument, asserting that the downstream uses of the software are irrelevant in determining whether or not 321 Studios itself was violating 1201(b)(1). The court said that, while there are legitimate uses that some users might engage in, 321 Studios itself was distributing software which had the primary purpose of circumventing CSS.

=== DMCA Constitutionality ===
==== Impermissible Restriction of Speech ====
The court rejected 321 Studios' argument that the DMCA, as enforced in this case, would result in an impermissible restriction of free speech. The court agreed with 321 Studios that computer code qualifies as speech for purposes of first amendment, however, they did not agree that enforcing the DMCA in this case would regulate computer code on the basis of content. The court held that only the functional element of the computer code was barred, and so the DMCA did not suppress the code based on its content. As such, the court applied an intermediate scrutiny standard in evaluating the restriction of speech in this case.

Applying the intermediate scrutiny standard, the court found that Congress enacted the DMCA while carefully balancing the interests of copyright holders and the public. As such, the court held that the DMCA suppressed only as much speech as necessary to the furtherance of the interests of copyright owners and so was not an impermissible restriction of speech.

==== Impermissible Burdens on Fair Use ====
The court rejected 321 Studios' argument that the DMCA unconstitutionally burdens the fair use rights of users of copyrighted materials. The court agreed with 321 Studios that fair use necessarily incorporates first amendment accommodations, but rejected that there is an absolute first amendment protection for fair use of copyrighted works. The court pointed out that fair use is still possible under the DMCA, even if it might be difficult to do so without circumventing CSS. 321 Studios argued that this places an unreasonable financial burden on fair use, an argument that the court said must be tied to the content of the speech, not simply the function. 321 Studios also argued that the DMCA also impairs access to non-copyrighted works protected by CSS. The court responded to this by asserting that a user could copy the access from a non-CSS encrypted DVD or from another non-digital source.

==== Over-Extension of the Scope of Congressional Powers ====
321 Studios further claimed that the DMCA is inevitably an over-extension of Congressional powers because the DMCA is inconsistent with fair use. The court rejected this conclusion using reasoning from the Universal Studios v. Corley case, stating that restricting one technological means of gaining access to or reproducing a work does not foreclose the possibility of making use of the work. 321 Studios asserted that the line of reasoning in previous DMCA cases was overturned by the conclusion in Eldred v. Ashcroft that fair use is constitutionally based. The court responded by emphasizing again that the DMCA does not eliminate fair use, and that fair use does not guarantee users of copyrighted works with using a work in any technological fashion.

== Impact ==
321 Studios inevitably shut down as a result of this decision and similar lawsuits. While the court's ruling on the constitutionality of the DMCA is consistent with rulings made across the country, many public interest groups have continued to lobby to overturn portions of the DMCA. Some have criticized the courts classification of CSS as an access control for purposes of the DMCA, arguing that "if every act of rendering protected content is an act of accessing the content and the statute prohibits individual circumvention of access controls, then the individual privilege to circumvent rights controls exists only in theory."
