= Pardon of Joe Arpaio =

2017 presidential pardon of Joe Arpaio

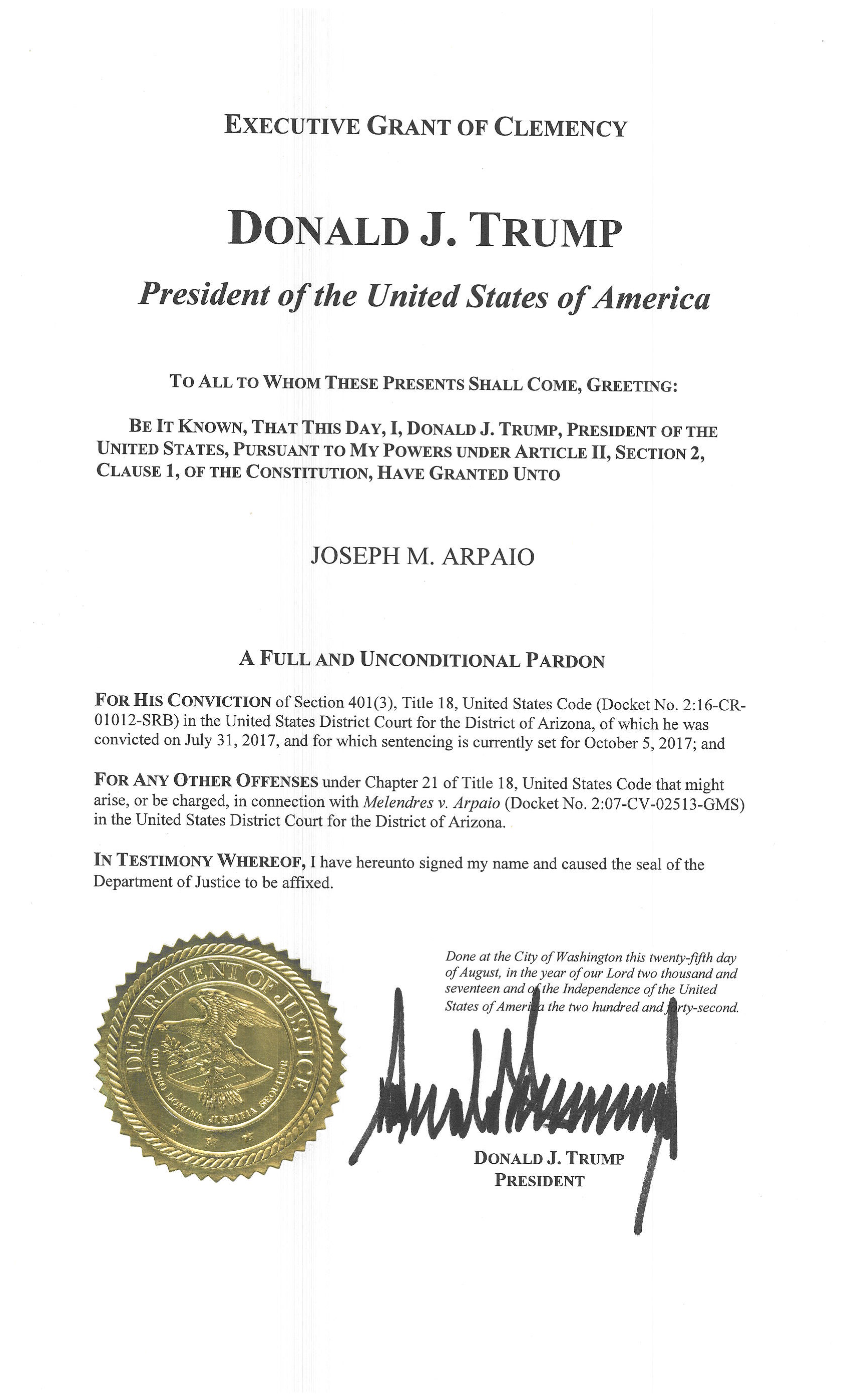
President Trump's full pardon of Joe Arpaio

On August 25, 2017, President Donald Trump pardoned Joe Arpaio for criminal contempt of court, a misdemeanor. Arpaio had been convicted of the crime two months earlier for disobeying a federal judge's order to stop racial profiling in detaining "individuals suspected of being in the U.S. illegally". The pardon covered Arpaio's conviction and "any other offenses under Chapter 21 of Title 18, United States Code that might arise, or be charged, in connection with Melendres v. Arpaio." The official White House statement announcing the grant of clemency described Arpaio as a "worthy candidate" having served the nation for more than fifty years "protecting the public from the scourges of crime and illegal immigration."

A number of law professors and political scientists described the pardon as troubling and unusual. Several experts on authoritarianism described the pardon as illiberal and said that it undermined the rule-of-law. U.S. District Judge Susan R. Bolton, who handed down the guilty verdict, did not vacate Arpaio's conviction, ruling that while the pardon relieves Arpaio of the burden of punishment, it does not change the facts of his crime.

== Background ==
In the case of Melendres v. Arpaio, Arpaio's office was found to be racial profiling Latinos and ordered to stop. Arpaio was found to have violated the court order, resulting in a finding of criminal contempt against him.

According to The Washington Post, Trump had previously asked Attorney General Jeff Sessions if the government could drop its case against Arpaio but was advised it would not be appropriate. He decided to wait for the results of the trial, and if Arpaio was convicted, he would grant clemency. On August 13, 2017, Trump told Fox News that he was "seriously considering a pardon" for Arpaio. At a rally in Phoenix, Arizona, he indicated a willingness to pardon Arpaio, stating that "I'll make a prediction. I think [Arpaio's] going to be just fine. But I won't do it tonight because I don't want to cause any controversy."

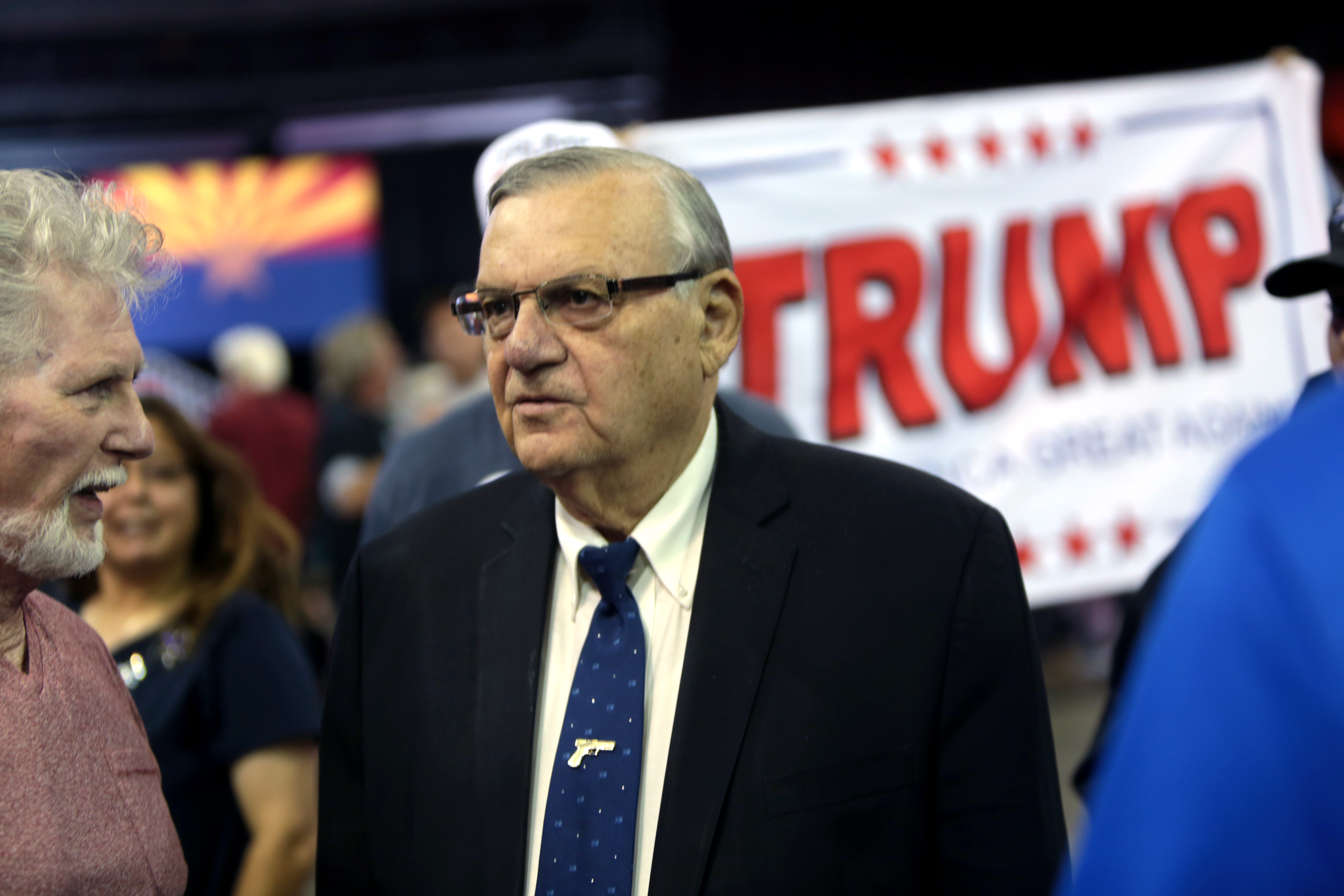
Sheriff Joe Arpaio speaking with supporters at a campaign rally for Donald Trump at the Prescott Valley Event Center in Prescott Valley, Arizona

Unnamed sources told reporters that Trump was prepared to issue a pardon, and was "gung-ho about it." After the verdict was handed down, Trump "bypassed the traditional review process", ensuring that Arpaio would not serve any time in prison. The pardon was issued August 25, 2017 prior to Arpaio's sentencing.

Trump announced Arpaio's pardon during the time media was focused on Hurricane Harvey as it made landfall along the Texas coast. In a statement several days later, Trump said that "in the middle of a hurricane, even though it was a Friday evening, I assumed the ratings would be far higher than they were normally." Democratic National Committee chair Tom Perez criticized the timing, saying it was announced "during a natural disaster that could hurt millions."

Trump also announced his decision on Twitter, declaring that Arpaio is an "American patriot" who had "kept Arizona safe." He defended the pardon by comparing it to "late-term pardons issued under the last two Democratic presidents". According to The Hill, "many Republicans in Arizona" had pushed Trump to pardon Arpaio, "arguing that he had been railroaded by the Justice Department under former President Obama." Representative Andy Biggs said Arpaio's conviction was "the culmination of a political witch hunt by the Obama administration to sideline and destroy a formidable opponent."

== Reactions to pardon ==
The pardon received mixed reviews on social media ranging from praise to condemnation. There was "strong criticism from activists, who denounced it as a slap in the face of those affected by Arpaio's racially motivated policies." Phoenix Mayor Greg Stanton considered it a slap in the face to Maricopa County whereas Arizona Governor Doug Ducey was among the politicians who praised the pardon, crediting Arpaio with helping to reduce crime over a long career. Ducey welcomed the finality the pardon gave to the whole matter.

John McCain, U.S. Senator from Arizona, criticized Arpaio for not expressing remorse for his actions, and criticized Trump saying the pardon "undermined the president's claim for the respect of rule of law." The other Senator from Arizona, Jeff Flake, said that he "would have preferred that the President honor the judicial process and let it take its course". House Speaker Paul Ryan also opposed the pardon.

== Legal and political analyses ==
In response to the pardon, The Washington Post said it was "a controversial decision, one that Trump critics labeled as an example of the president's illiberal, rule-of-law violating, authoritarian impulses." Harvard Law School professor Charles Fried, the former solicitor general for Ronald Reagan, said Trump's use of authority was specifically "to undermine the only weapon that a judge has in this kind of ultimate confrontation." Another Harvard Law School professor, Noah Feldman, said the pardon "would express presidential contempt for the Constitution". According to The New York Times, legal experts found the fact that Trump "used his constitutional power to block a federal judge's effort to enforce the Constitution" to be the "most troubling aspect of the pardon". Cornell Law School professor Josh Chafetz argued that the problem with the pardon was not so much the process (as the president's power on this issue is broad and unqualified), but rather that "Arpaio's entire claim to national recognition was based on his being a xenophobe, a racist and an officer of the machinery of government who relished wielding that machinery to degrade some of the most powerless members of our society."

Adam Liptak, attorney and Supreme Court correspondent, questioned the wisdom of the pardon but not its legitimacy: "It was the first act of outright defiance against the judiciary by a president who has not been shy about criticizing federal judges who ruled against his businesses and policies. But while the move may have been unusual, there is nothing in the text of the Constitution's pardons clause to suggest that he exceeded his authority. The president, the clause says, 'shall have power to grant reprieves and pardons for offenses against the United States, except in cases of impeachment.' The pardon power extends only to federal crimes. Otherwise, presidents are free to use it as they see fit. As the Supreme Court put it in an 1866 decision involving a former Confederate senator, Ex parte Garland, the power 'is unlimited.'"

== Subsequent proceedings ==
After the August 2017 pardon was issued, Bolton requested legal arguments from attorneys on both sides regarding how they wanted to move forward since a verdict was reached but he had not yet been technically convicted. Amicus briefs arguing that the pardon unconstitutionally infringed on the power of the federal courts were filed by the Protect Democracy Project and Roderick and Solange MacArthur Justice Center. Bolton requested a response from prosecutors with the Department of Justice, who stated in a court filing dated September 21, 2017, that Arpaio "is entitled to have the guilty verdict and all rulings in his criminal contempt of court case formally nullified by the court as a result of the pardon." They also acknowledged in their statement the absence of any legal precedent in the Arpaio case which could answer "what should happen when someone receives a pardon after a verdict is reached (in this case by a judge) but before the conviction is officially entered." Several organizations, individuals, and members of Congress had petitioned the court asking the judge "not to accept the pardon or not to dismiss the finding of guilt", several of whom considered the pardon Trump's affront to the judiciary. Kathy Brody, legal director for the ACLU of Arizona said, "From our perspective, it's very important that the findings of fact remain."

At the October 2017 hearing, Bolton held the position that "she had no choice but to validate Arpaio's Aug. 25 pardon by President Donald Trump and throw out the finding of guilt in his criminal contempt case because he had not yet been sentenced and was not afforded an opportunity to appeal the verdict." Arpaio's attorneys filed a motion to "formally dismiss Arpaio's criminal case", including removing Bolton's reasoning for the guilty verdict in her ruling. With the guilty verdict dismissed, Bolton agreed to carefully consider her decision on the other rulings.

On October 19, 2017, Bolton issued a four-page order denying Arpaio's motion to vacate all the rulings in the case. The judge wrote that Trump's pardon did not "revise the historical facts" of the case, even though the pardon may have eliminated the possibility of punishment. She wrote:

"The power to pardon is an executive prerogative of mercy, not of judicial recordkeeping." United States v. Noonan, 906 F.2d 952, 955 (3d Cir. 1990). To vacate all rulings in this case would run afoul of this important distinction. The Court found Defendant guilty of criminal contempt.

ACLU-AZ deputy legal director, Cecillia Wang, attorney for the plaintiffs, agreed with Bolton's denial of the motion stating, "The court made detailed findings after a bench trial about Joe Arpaio's criminal conduct. The court's findings and documents in the record of the case should stand and now will stand."

Subsequently, an appeal was made to the United States Court of Appeals for the Ninth Circuit to force the conviction to be vacated. With the Trump Justice Department declining to defend the verdict, the Ninth Circuit moved to appoint a disinterested special prosecutor. A motion for a full en banc review was denied, and a special prosecutor, Christopher Caldwell, was appointed on October 15, 2018. The case was heard on October 23, 2019. On February 27, 2020, the Court ruled in denial of the appeal, affirming Bolton's refusal to vacate the conviction.

== See also ==
- List of people granted executive clemency in the first Trump presidency
