= Paul Schiff Berman =

American legal scholar (born 1966)

- Born: February 12, 1966 (age 60)
- Education: Princeton University (BA); New York University School of Law (JD)
- Occupation: Lawyer
- Spouse: Laura A. Dickinson (m. 2000)

Paul Schiff Berman (born February 12, 1966) is an American lawyer and the Walter S. Cox Professor of Law at The George Washington University School of Law. He has held several other positions at the University including Vice Provost for Online Education and Academic Innovation and Dean of the School of Law.

== Education ==
Berman earned his Bachelor of Arts, summa cum laude, from Princeton University in 1988 and his Juris Doctor in 1995 from New York University School of Law where he served as Managing Editor of the New York University Law Review and received the University Graduation Prize for the graduating law student with the highest cumulative grade point average.

== Career ==
Prior to entering law, Berman was, from 1988 to 2005, Artistic Director of Spin Theater, a theater company based in New York City. He was also Administrative Director of The Wooster Group and was the founding Administrator for Richard Foreman's Ontological-Hysteric Theatre at Saint Mark's Church in the East Village.

He served as law clerk to then-Chief Judge Harry T. Edwards, of the United States Court of Appeals for the District of Columbia Circuit, and for Associate Justice Ruth Bader Ginsburg, of the United States Supreme Court.

He was a professor at the University of Connecticut School of Law, where he taught from 1997 to 2008. His scholarship focuses on the multiple effects of globalization on legal systems. Berman served as dean of the Sandra Day O'Connor College of Law of Arizona State University from 2008 to 2011.

He served as dean of The George Washington University Law School and Robert Kramer Research Professor of Law from 2011 to 2013. From 2013 to 2016, Berman served as George Washington University's Vice Provost for Online Education and Academic Innovation. He was honored for his work at a portrait unveiling ceremony at the University in 2016, at which law school staff, faculty, alumni, and students praised his deanship.

Berman, the Walter S. Cox Professor of Law at The George Washington University Law School, is one of the world's foremost theorists on the effect of globalization on the interactions among legal systems. He is the author of over sixty scholarly works, including Global Legal Pluralism: A Jurisprudence of Law Beyond Borders, published by Cambridge University Press in 2012. He is also the author of The Oxford Handbook of Global Legal Pluralism, published in 2020. He was among the first legal scholars to focus on legal issues regarding online activity, and he is co-author of one of the leading casebooks in the field.

== Personal life ==
Berman is married to Laura A. Dickinson since 2000.

== Selected publications ==
=== Articles ===
- Berman, Paul Schiff (April 10, 2002). "The Globalization of Jurisdiction". University of Pennsylvania Law Review. 151 (2): 311–529. doi:10.2307/3312952. JSTOR 3312952. SSRN 304621 – via ssrn.
- — (April 18, 2005). "From International Law to Law and Globalization". Columbia Journal of Transnational Law. 43: 485. SSRN 700668 – via ssrn.
- — (May 19, 2005). "Towards a Cosmopolitan Vision of Conflict of Laws: Redefining Governmental Interests in a Global Era". University of Pennsylvania Law Review. 153 (6): 1819–1882. doi:10.2307/4150651. JSTOR 4150651. S2CID 53585675. SSRN 725221 – via ssrn.
- — (September 3, 2005). "Review Essay: 'Seeing Beyond the Limits of International Law,' Jack L. Goldsmith and Eric a. Posner, 'the Limits of International Law'". Texas Law Review. 84: 1265–1306. SSRN 793584 – via ssrn.

=== Books and book chapters ===
- Berman, Paul Schiff, ed. (2006). The Globalization of International Law. Routledge. ISBN 9780754624127.
- — (2012). Global Legal Pluralism: A Jurisprudence of Law beyond Borders. Cambridge University Press. ISBN 978-0521769822.
- — (2020). The Oxford Handbook of Global Legal Pluralism. Oxford University Press. ISBN 9780197516744.
- Bellia, Patricia L.; Berman, Paul Schiff; Frischmann, Brett M; Post, David G. (2018). Cyberlaw: Problems of Policy and Jurisprudence in the Information Age (American Casebook Series) (5 ed.). West Academic Publishing. ISBN 978-1640208544.

== See also ==
- List of law clerks for the sixth seat of the Supreme Court of the United States
