= DVD X Copy =

- Developer: 321 Studios
- Stable release: 4.0.3.8 / February 2004
- Operating system: Windows
- License: Shareware
- Website: www.dvdxcopy.com

DVD X Copy is a DVD ripper for Microsoft Windows that enables users to duplicate DVD videos onto recordable DVDs. Most commercial DVD movies include Content Scramble System (CSS), a copy-protection technology designed to prevent DVD movies from being copied. This controversial DVD copy software program included technology that decrypts the CSS copy protection mechanism on DVD movie discs. DVD X Copy products are still being sold on the DVD X Copy website, although it was previously believed to be no longer sold or supported.

This DVD copy software program was created by 321 Studios. The DVDXCopy product line included DVD X Copy, DVD X Copy Xpress, DVD X Copy Gold and DVD X Copy Platinum. The DVD X Copy line of products were sold through major North American and International retailers and online via the official website.

== Legal battle ==
Anticipating a lawsuit by the major Hollywood motion picture studios, in April 2002, 321 Studios filed a pre-emptive complaint against eight Hollywood studios contending that the Digital Millennium Copyright Act (DMCA), a law that prohibits the circumvention of copy protection technology, violates consumer rights as provided in the Fair Use doctrine of the Copyright Act of 1976. The Fair Use doctrine provides individuals with limited rights to copy certain forms of copyrighted material. The complaint named MGM Studios, Tristar Pictures, Columbia Pictures, Sony Pictures Entertainment, Time Warner Entertainment, Disney Enterprises, Inc., Universal City Studios, The Saul Zaentz Company and Pixar as defendants.

In May 2003 seven of the Hollywood studios including MGM Studios, Tristar Pictures, Columbia Pictures, Time Warner Entertainment, Disney, Universal City Studios and The Saul Zaentz Company countersued 321 Studios by filing a series of claims alleging that the DVD X Copy products violated the DMCA.

On February 23, 2004, Judge Susan Illston of the Northern District Federal Court for California ruled that 321 Studios' products violated copyright law and ordered an injunction that prohibited the sale of DVD X Copy products in the United States within seven days of the injunction. 321 Studios proceeded to remove all products from the US retail channel and from the http://www.dvdxcopy.com website. The ruling caused 321 Studios to shut down with the company finally ceasing operations in August 2004.

== See also ==
- DVD ripper type of software with similar feature
- AnyDVD
- DVD-Cloner
