= Harold R. DeMoss Jr. =

American judge (1930–2020)

Harold Raymond DeMoss Jr.

Senior Judge of the United States Court of Appeals for the Fifth Circuit
- In office July 1, 2007 – April 16, 2015

Judge of the United States Court of Appeals for the Fifth Circuit
- In office December 2, 1991 – July 1, 2007
- Appointed by: George H. W. Bush
- Preceded by: Jerre Stockton Williams
- Succeeded by: Catharina Haynes

Personal details
- Born: Harold R. DeMoss Jr. December 30, 1930 Houston, Texas, U.S.
- Died: April 29, 2020 (aged 89) Houston, Texas, U.S.
- Education: Rice University (BA); University of Texas School of Law (LLB)

Harold Raymond DeMoss Jr. (December 30, 1930 – April 29, 2020) was a former United States circuit judge of the United States Court of Appeals for the Fifth Circuit.

== Education and career ==
DeMoss graduated from Rice University with a Bachelor of Arts degree in 1952 and the University of Texas School of Law with a Juris Doctor in 1955. After serving in the United States Army from 1955 to 1957, he joined the Houston law firm Bracewell & Patterson, where he became a partner and remained until his appointment to the bench. In 1988, he took a six-month sabbatical from the firm to work on the presidential campaign of George H. W. Bush.

== Federal judicial service ==
DeMoss was nominated by President George H. W. Bush on June 27, 1991, to a seat on the United States Court of Appeals for the Fifth Circuit vacated by Judge Jerre Stockton Williams. He was confirmed by the United States Senate on November 27, 1991, and received commission on December 2, 1991. He assumed senior status on July 1, 2007. His service terminated on April 16, 2015, due to retirement.

Legal offices
Preceded by Jerre Stockton Williams	Judge of the United States Court of Appeals for the Fifth Circuit; 1991–2007	Succeeded by Catharina Haynes
