= Emily Buss =

Lawyer and law professor

- Title: Mark and Barbara Fried Professor of Law

Academic background
- Education: Yale University

Emily Buss is an American lawyer and law professor. She is Mark and Barbara Fried Professor of Law at the University of Chicago Law School. Her research focuses on child and parental rights.

== Education ==
Buss attended Yale University for college, graduating summa cum laude in 1982, and law school, earning a JD in 1986.

== Career ==
Buss clerked for United States Supreme Court Justice Harry Blackmun. She worked at the Juvenile Law Center in Philadelphia, Pennsylvania from 1990 to 1996 when she joined the University of Chicago Law School faculty. In 2007, she was promoted to Mark and Barbara Fried Professor of Law.

Buss’s research focuses on child and parental rights, as well as the distribution of responsibility for child development among parents, the state and the child. She is the author of From Foster Care to Adulthood: The University of Chicago Law School Foster Care Project's Protocol for Reform and the co-editor, with Mavis Maclean, of The Law and Child Development (Ashgate, 2010).

== Publications ==
=== Books ===
- Buss, Emily, From Foster Care to Adulthood: The University of Chicago Law School Foster Care Project's Protocol for Reform

=== Edited collections ===
- Buss, Emily; Maclean, Mavis, eds. (2010), The Law and Child Development, Ashgate

=== Articles ===
- Buss, Emily (1995–1996), ""You're My What?"--The Problem of Children's Misperceptions of Their Lawyers' Roles", Fordham L. Rev., vol. 69, p. 1699
- Buss, Emily (1998–1999), "Confronting Developmental Barriers to the Empowerment of Child Clients", Cornell L. Rev., 84: 895
- Buss, Emily (1999–2000), "What Does Frieda Yoder Believe?", U. Pa. J. Const. L., vol. 2, p. 53
- Buss, Emily (2000), "The Adolescent's Stake in the Allocation of Educational Control between Parent and State", U. Chi. L. Rev., 67 (4): 1233–1289, doi:10.2307/1600457, JSTOR 1600457
- Buss, Emily (May 2002), ""Parental" Rights", Virginia Law Review, 88 (3): 635–683, doi:10.2307/1073980, JSTOR 1073980
- Buss, Emily (2003), "The Missed Opportunity in Gault", U. Chi. L. Rev, vol. 70, p. 39
- Buss, Emily (2004), "Allocating Developmental Control among Parent, Child and the State", U. Chi. Legal F., vol. 2004, p. 27
- Buss, Emily (2004), "Constitutional Fidelity through Children's Rights", The Supreme Court Review, 2004: 355–407, doi:10.1086/scr.2004.3536973, S2CID 142728739
- Buss, Emily (2009–2010), "What the Law Should (And Should Not) Learn from Child Development Research", Hofstra L. Rev., vol. 38, p. 13

== See also ==
- List of law clerks for the second seat of the Supreme Court of the United States
