= Susan Illston =

American judge (born 1948)

Susan Yvonne Illston
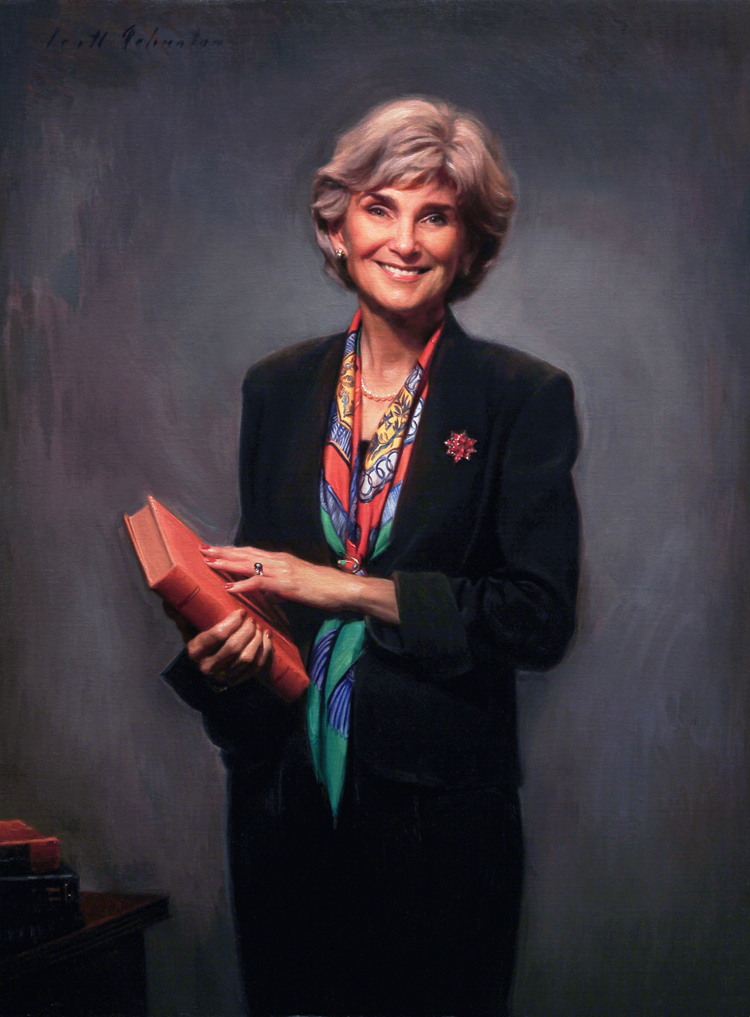
- Illston in 2014

Senior Judge of the United States District Court for the Northern District of California
- Incumbent
- Assumed office July 1, 2013

Judge of the United States District Court for the Northern District of California
- In office May 26, 1995 – July 1, 2013
- Appointed by: Bill Clinton
- Preceded by: Barbara A. Caulfield
- Succeeded by: Vince Chhabria

Personal details
- Born: 1948 (age 77–78) Tokyo, Japan
- Education: Duke University (BA); Stanford University (JD)

Susan Yvonne Illston (born 1948) is a senior United States district judge of the United States District Court for the Northern District of California. She was nominated by President Bill Clinton and confirmed by the Senate in 1995. She assumed senior status in 2013.

== Education and career ==
Illston was born in Tokyo, Japan, raised in the military & attended Fort Knox High School. She graduated from Duke University, receiving a Bachelor of Arts in 1970 & she received a Juris Doctor from Stanford Law School in 1973. Prior to her appointment, Illston worked in private practice first as an associate, then as a partner, at Cotchett, Illston & Pitre in Burlingame, California from 1973 to 1995.

== Federal judicial service ==
On the recommendations of Senators Barbara Boxer and Dianne Feinstein, Illston was nominated by President Bill Clinton on January 23, 1995 and confirmed by the Senate on May 25, 1995 by voice vote, receiving her commission the following day. She took senior status on July 1, 2013.

== Notable cases ==
=== DiLoreto v. Downey ===
Sitting by designation of the Ninth Circuit Court of Appeals, in 1999 Illston wrote the panel decision in DiLoreto v. Downey Unified School District Board of Education, 196 F.3d 958 (9th Cir. 1999), cert. denied, 529 U.S. 1067 (2000), which held that an athletic fence which a public high school made available for commercial advertising is a nonpublic forum from which religious messages could be excluded without violating the First Amendment.

=== 321 Studios v. Metro Goldwyn Mayer Studios, Inc. ===
In February 2004, Illston ruled in 321 Studios v. Metro Goldwyn Mayer Studios, Inc. that the company's software, which was intended, according to the company, to allow consumers to make backup copies of DVDs by "circumventing" so-called "copy protection" methods, was illegal under Federal law. She issued an injunction at the behest of several Hollywood studios and ordered 321 Studios to stop selling their product. However, despite finding that the software violated Federal law, she ruled that copies made by consumers (of their own legally purchased DVDs) were, in fact, legal. She wrote in her opinion, "It is the technology itself at issue, not the uses to which the copyrighted material may be put...Legal downstream use of the copyrighted material by customers is not a defense to the software manufacturer's violation of the provisions [of copyright law]."

=== US v. Arnold ===
In August 2006, Illston sentenced Patrick Arnold, a chemist who developed an undetectable performance-enhancing drug for BALCO, to three months in prison.

=== US v. Bonds ===
In March 2009, Illston presided over a perjury case involving Barry Bonds.

=== Kyriacou v. Peralta Community College Dist. ===
In April 2009, Illston ruled that two students who were threatened with suspension by their community college, the College of Alameda, could sue the school for free speech infringement.

=== Center for Biological Diversity v. Bureau of Land Management (2006 and 2021 cases) ===
In October 2009, (case 3:06-cv-04884-SI) Judge Illston ruled in favor of environmental groups, including the Center for Biological Diversity, that sued the U.S. Bureau of Land Management (BLM) over a 5,000 mile expansion of off-roading trails in California's Mojave Desert. Illston found that the BLM had violated its own regulations when it designated the routes in 2006 without adequately analyzing the impacts on air quality, soils, plant communities and sensitive species such as the endangered Mojave fringe-toed lizard. Illston called the BLM's plan "flawed because it does not contain a reasonable range of alternatives" to limit damage to sensitive habitat and pointed out that the desert and its resources are "extremely fragile, easily scarred, and slowly healed." The court also found that the BLM had failed to follow route restrictions established in the agency’s own conservation plan, resulting in the establishment of hundreds of illegal off roading routes during the past three decades. Illston ruled that the plan specifically violated the Federal Land Policy and Management Act of 1976 (FLPMA) and the National Environmental Policy Act of 1969 (NEPA).

The Bureau of Land Management was required, as a result of the lawsuit by the Center for Biological Diversity, to prepare a new inventory of routes and to reconsider the routes that would be included in the revised network. That process concluded with a Record of Decision filed by the BLM in the Federal Register on October 4, 2019. That Record of Decision expanded the West Mojave Route Network Project (WMRNP) by approximately 20% to 5997 miles.

In response, the Center for Biological Diversity filed another lawsuit (3:21-cv-07171-SI) in September 2021 opposing the expansion of the network and the resulting degradation of the environment. The new case was also heard by Judge Illston, who issued her decision on October 16, 2024. The result was similar to the result of the previous case. Judge Illston wrote in her opinion that "the Court concludes that the BLM’s 2019 OHV route network does not comply [with] the minimization criteria because the record does not affirmatively demonstrate how the BLM designated OHV routes with the objective of minimizing impacts on the desert tortoise, the Lane Mountain milk-vetch, and other resources, and because the BLM improperly relied on optional, post-designation 'mitigation' measures to satisfy its obligation to designate OHV routes that complied with the regulatory criteria."

The Center for Biological Diversity and the Bureau of Land Management began to negotiate a settlement to the lawsuit in November 2024. That effort failed, which led to granting of partial vacatur and injunctive relief on behalf of the plaintiffs issued by Judge Illston on January 23, 2026. One of the key elements of the ruling is a closure order during the remand period. On page 8 of her ruling Judge Illston wrote that

"[T]he Court grants the following injunctive relief for the duration of the remand proceedings: 1. BLM is ordered to close all OHV routes in desert tortoise and LMMV designated critical habitat and clearly mark such routes as closed with appropriate signage and fencing as needed. BLM shall keep open designated county roads and highways, as well as any and all routes needed to provide access for established easements, administrative access, emergency access, and other permitted uses (but not public OHV recreational use)."

The remand period will end on October 14, 2029 (p. 6). The remedy order issued on January 11, 2011 did not grant plaintiffs' request for closure. In that earlier order (on p. 16) Judge Illston wrote that:

"BLM's primary argument against closures is that closures are unnecessary because BLM’s regulatory measures, such as signage and monitoring of closed routes, will prevent unauthorized OHV use. Because the Court has granted plaintiffs’ request for targeted injunctive relief requiring BLM to implement the protective and monitoring measures outlined in the WEMO Plan, the Court finds that plaintiffs have not shown that further injunctive relief in the form of closures is warranted at this time."

Measures by the BLM to prevent unauthorized use, including on private property, failed by their own admission. In their 2019 grant application to the Off-Highway Motor Vehicle Recreation (OHMVR) Division of the California State Parks BLM Law Enforcement wrote that:

"Unlawful 'off route' travel, trespass/incursion and resource damage within sensitive desert habitat such as wilderness areas, Areas of Critical Environmental Concern (ACEC) and onto private lands continue to occur frequently despite efforts to stop this illegal behavior through means such as signs, barriers, kiosks and maps which are widely distributed and available to the recreating public. Rehabilitated intrusions and structural improvements meant to educate and guide OHV travelers onto lawful routes of travel continue to be disregarded and destroyed by reckless OHV operation."

(To see this document its necessary to enter the URL for the document into a browser because the Online Grants Application portal from the California State Parks does not permit links to its documents, but it does allow entry of the path to a document in a browser. That URL is olga.ohv.parks.ca.gov/egrams_ohmvr/designer/viewPDF.aspx?ShowPDF=Y&ExtUser=Y&TempID=48&Filename=Application_48_L.PDF&cat=GCA&appid=7566&fyr=2019.) In every year between 2019 and 2015 BLM similarly admitted that they were unable to control trespass and property damage, including onto private property in the area. In her 2011 remedy order Judge Illston concluded that "BLM’s regulatory measures, such as signage and monitoring of closed routes, will prevent unauthorized OHV use." After 15 years of failed efforts by the BLM to control property damage, Judge Illston concluded in her order on January 23, 2026 that the BLM needs to close routes in desert tortoise habitat during the remand period to limit ongoing damage.

=== Sony v. Hotz ===
Illston in 2011 was the presiding judge in Sony Computer Entertainment America LLC v. George Hotz, et al., in which Sony claimed that Hotz's jailbreaking of the Sony PlayStation 3 violated the Digital Millennium Copyright Act. She granted Sony permission to track as much information as possible about those who had seen a private YouTube video about the jailbreak and to read their comments, plus obtain access to IP addresses, accounts, and other details of visitors to sites run by Geohot. The access granted by Illston extended even to those who had not downloaded the jailbreak code.

=== In Re: National Security Letters ===
In a March 15, 2013, ruling Judge Illston granted petitioner's motion to set aside a National Security Letter (NSL), ruling that the NSL's nondisclosure and judicial review provisions suffer from significant Constitutional infirmities. The petitioner argued that the nondisclosure provision of statute 18 U.S.C. § 2709(c) was an unconstitutional prior restraint and content-based restriction on speech. The decision came in a lawsuit challenging a NSL on behalf of an unnamed telecommunications company represented by the Electronic Frontier Foundation (EFF). The judge stayed her decision for 90 days to give the government the opportunity to appeal.

=== Pirani v. Slack Technologies, Inc. ===
In April 2020, Illston issued an order—ultimately overturned by the US Supreme Court—denying Slack Technologies’ motion to dismiss a securities class action complaint against it following a direct listing by the company. The judge held that the plaintiff did not lack standing to pursue claims under Section 11 of the Securities Act where the purchased shares were not traceable to the allegedly misleading registration statement, in the unique situation of a direct listing in which shares registered under the Securities Act become publicly tradeable on the same day that unregistered shares become publicly tradeable, even though the plaintiff could not show that the shares the plaintiff acquired were registered. Illiston certified her ruling for interlocutory appeal, and the Ninth Circuit - with a divided panel - affirmed. Dissenting, Judge Eric D. Miller argued that Sections 11 and 12 require a plaintiff to prove that he purchased securities registered under a materially misleading registration statement, something Pirani had not done, and cited a long line of lower court decisions that interpreted Section 11 as applying only to shares purchased pursuant to a registration statement.

The United States Supreme Court ultimately reviewed the case. It noted in its unanimous June 2023 decision in Slack Technologies, LLC v. Pirani, No. 22-200, 598 U.S. ___ (2023), that lower federal courts had held since the 1960s that liability under Section 11 of the Securities Act of 1933 attaches "only when a buyer can trace the shares he has purchased to a false or misleading registration statement." It held that "because we think the better reading of the particular provision before us requires a plaintiff to plead and prove that he purchased shares traceable to the allegedly defective registration statement, we vacate the Ninth Circuit’s judgment holding otherwise."

The case was remanded to the Ninth Circuit, which held in 2025 that because the plaintiff previously conceded that he could not make the required showing that the securities that he purchased were traceable to the particular registration statement alleged to be false or misleading, all of his claims failed, and the court consequently reversed and remanded the case with instructions to dismiss the complaint in full and with prejudice.

=== Anoke v. X Holdings Corp. ===
On 20 August 2024, Illston granted a motion to unseal a list of shareholders of X Holdings Corp. (which owns Twitter since the acquisition by Elon Musk). The unsealed document was published to the court's website.

== Publications ==
- California Complex Litigation Manual (1990)
- Insurance Coverage in a Toxic Tort Case, A Guide to Toxic Torts (1987)

Legal offices
Preceded by Barbara A. Caulfield	Judge of the United States District Court for the Northern District of California; 1995–2013	Succeeded by Vince Chhabria
