= Jerre Stockton Williams =

American judge (1916–1993)

Senior Judge of the United States Court of Appeals for the Fifth Circuit
- In office July 2, 1990 – August 29, 1993

Judge of the United States Court of Appeals for the Fifth Circuit
- In office June 18, 1980 – July 2, 1990
- Appointed by: Jimmy Carter
- Preceded by: Irving Loeb Goldberg
- Succeeded by: Harold R. DeMoss Jr.

1st Chair of the Administrative Conference of the United States
- In office 1968–1970
- President: Richard Nixon
- Succeeded by: Roger C. Cramton

Personal details
- Born: Jerre Stockton Williams; August 21, 1916 Denver, Colorado
- Died: August 29, 1993 (aged 77) Austin, Texas
- Education: University of Denver (AB); Columbia Law School (JD)

Jerre Stockton Williams (August 21, 1916 – August 29, 1993) was a United States circuit judge of the United States Court of Appeals for the Fifth Circuit.

== Education and career ==
Born in Denver, Colorado, Williams received an Artium Baccalaureus degree from the University of Denver in 1938 and a Juris Doctor from Columbia Law School in 1941. He was an instructor in law at the University of Iowa College of Law in Iowa City, Iowa from 1941 to 1942. He was an assistant attorney of the Office of Price Administration in Washington, D.C. in 1942. He was in the United States Army Air Corps as a Captain from 1942 to 1946. He was an assistant professor of law at the University of Denver in 1946. He was a professor at the University of Texas at Austin in Austin, Texas from 1946 to 1967 and from 1970 to 1980. He was an associate professor of law from 1946 to 1950. He was a Professor of law from 1950 to 1967. He was the John B. Connally Chair of civil jurisprudence from 1970 to 1980. He was an associate director of the Study of Loyalty-Security Program of the Association of the Bar of New York City, New York from 1955 to 1956. He was a consultant for the Bureau of the Budget (now the Office of Management and Budget) in Washington, D.C. from 1966 to 1967. He was the Chairman of the Administrative Conference of the United States in Washington, D.C. from 1968 to 1970.

== Federal judicial service ==
On April 14, 1980, Williams was nominated by President Jimmy Carter to a seat on the United States Court of Appeals for the Fifth Circuit vacated by Judge Irving Loeb Goldberg. Williams was confirmed by the United States Senate on June 18, 1980, and received his commission the same day. He assumed senior status on July 2, 1990. Williams served in that capacity until his death on August 29, 1993, in Austin.

== Sources ==
Legal offices
Preceded by Irving Loeb Goldberg	Judge of the United States Court of Appeals for the Fifth Circuit; 1980–1990	Succeeded by Harold R. DeMoss Jr.
