= Catharina Haynes =

American judge (born 1963)

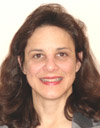

Judge of the United States Court of Appeals for the Fifth Circuit
- Incumbent
- Assumed office April 18, 2008
- Appointed by: George W. Bush
- Preceded by: Harold R. DeMoss Jr.

Personal details
- Born: Catharina Jacoba Hendrika Dubbeldam; November 9, 1963 (age 62) Melbourne, Florida, U.S.
- Party: Republican
- Spouse: Craig Haynes
- Education: Florida Institute of Technology (BS); Emory University (JD)

Catharina Jacoba Hendrika Dubbelday Haynes (Note: born with last name Dubbeldam, later changed to Dubbelday) (born November 9, 1963) is a United States circuit judge of the United States Court of Appeals for the Fifth Circuit.

== Background ==
Haynes was born in Melbourne, Florida. Her father was a Dutch immigrant from Indonesia. She graduated from Satellite High School, Satellite Beach, Florida, in 1980. She received a Bachelor of Science degree in Psychology from the Florida Institute of Technology in 1983 at the age of 19, graduating first in her class. She graduated second in her class from Emory University School of Law in 1986 with her Juris Doctor at the age of 22. While at Emory, she was an editor for the Emory Law Journal. She became a member of the State Bar of Texas in 1986.

After law school, Haynes was in private practice in Texas from 1986 to 1998 with the firms of Thompson & Knight, as an associate from 1986 to 1988 and then Baker Botts, as an associate from 1988 to 1995, and then became a partner in 1995.

In 1998, Haynes was elected as a Republican to the 191st District Court in Dallas, Texas. She was re-elected in 2002. As a state district court judge, she presided over jury and bench trials involving civil litigation. After narrowly losing re-election in 2006, she returned to Baker Botts as a partner, where she practiced complex business litigation and maintained an appellate and Supreme Court practice.

== Federal judicial service ==
On the recommendation of Senators John Cornyn and Kay Bailey Hutchison, Haynes was nominated on July 17, 2007 by President George W. Bush to fill a vacancy on the Fifth Circuit created by Judge Harold R. DeMoss Jr., who assumed senior status on July 1, 2007. Haynes received a hearing before the Senate Judiciary Committee on February 21, 2008, and was voted out of committee on April 3, 2008. She was confirmed by the United States Senate by unanimous consent on April 10, 2008, just under nine months after her nomination. She received her commission on April 18, 2008. She maintains chambers in Dallas.

== Notes ==
Legal offices
Preceded by Harold R. DeMoss Jr.	Judge of the United States Court of Appeals for the Fifth Circuit; 2008–present	Incumbent
