= Jennifer Nou =

American legal scholar

- Born: 1980 (age 45–46); Minneapolis, Minnesota, U.S.
- Education: Yale University (BA, JD); Oxford University (MPhil)
- Employer: University of Chicago Law School
- Known for: Administrative law

Jennifer Nou (born 1980) is an American legal scholar who is currently a professor of law at the University of Chicago Law School and a senior advisor in the federal Office of Information and Regulatory Affairs (OIRA). She writes and teaches in the areas of administrative law, regulatory policy and constitutional law.

== Early life ==
Jennifer was born in Minneapolis, Minnesota to parents of Korean origin, who were both naturalized in 1980.

== Education and career ==
Nou graduated from Yale University with a Bachelor of Arts summa cum laude in 2002, majoring in economics and political science. She later studied at Oxford University on a Marshall Scholarship and graduated in 2004 with a Master of Philosophy in politics with distinction. Nou was a Legal Intern for the US Attorney’s Office in the Southern District of New York Civil Division during the summer 2006. In 2008, she graduated with a Juris Doctor from Yale Law School, where she served as projects editor on the Yale Law Journal.

After graduating from law school, Nou clerked for Judge Richard A. Posner on the U.S. Court of Appeals for the Seventh Circuit and Justice Stephen Breyer on the U.S. Supreme Court. Between 2010 and 2011, she served as a policy analyst and special assistant to the administrator of (OIRA) at the time, Cass Sunstein. Nou returned to OIRA in 2022, serving as a Senior Advisor in the office, with a focus on modernizing regulatory review.

Nou joined the faculty at the University of Chicago Law School in 2012 as a public law fellow and later as an assistant professor in 2013. In 2018, she was appointed as a tenured professor of law. Her research focuses on administrative law, legislation, legal interpretation, and election law. Nou is a faculty advisor for the American Constitution Society. Since 2016, Nou has served as a member of the Administrative Conference of the United States.

== See also ==
- List of law clerks for the second seat of the Supreme Court of the United States
