= Michael Wishnie =

American legal scholar

Academic background
- Education: Yale Law School

Academic work
- Discipline: Law
- Sub-discipline: Immigration Law
- Institutions: Yale Law School

Michael Wishnie is a clinical professor of law at Yale Law School.

== Clinical work ==
Wishnie teaches two clinics at Yale Law School. The "9/11 Clinic," known formally as "Balancing Civil Liberties and National Security after September 11," represents detainees in civil rights cases. The Workers and Immigrants Advocacy Clinic (WIRAC) handles a host of immigrants' and workers' rights issues, including state and local law enforcement of civil immigration law, mandatory detention, labor trafficking, bilingual education, and access to welfare, in both the litigation and non-litigation context.

Wishnie is known in the clinical law community for his innovative work representing grassroots community groups, his use of international law, and his belief that students ought to be trained in all aspects of advocacy, including organizing constituents, lobbying, and media relations.

== Biography ==
Wishnie received his B.A. from Yale University in 1987, and his J.D. from Yale Law School in 1993. After receiving his B.A., Wishnie taught in the People's Republic of China for two years under the auspices of the Yale-China Association.

While a law student, Wishnie collaborated with other students and professor Harold Koh representing Haitian refugees in a case that reached the U.S. Supreme Court. After his first year of law school he worked as an organizer for the Chinese Staff and Workers' Association. While a third-year law student Wishnie worked for the Center for Constitutional Rights.

After law school Wishnie worked in the Brooklyn Neighborhood Office of the Legal Aid Society. He then clerked for Judge H. Lee Sarokin on the U.S. Court of Appeals for the Third Circuit, and for Supreme Court Justices Harry A. Blackmun and Stephen G. Breyer. He then received a Skadden Fellowship to work for the American Civil Liberties Union, representing New York City taxi drivers, garment, construction, restaurant, and domestic workers. Wishnie then served as co-director of the Arthur Garfield Hays Civil Liberties Program at New York University School of Law.

Wishnie is married to Cathy Edwards, arts administrator who worked as artistic director of Dance Theater Workshop in New York City. They have two children, Rachel and Ben.

== Academic works ==
State and Local Police Enforcement of Immigration Laws, 6 U. Pa. J. Const. L. 1084 (2004)

Emerging Issues for Undocumented Workers, 6 U. Pa. J. Lab. & Emp. L. 497 (2004)

Introduction: The Border Crossed Us: Current Issues in Immigrant Labor, 28 N.Y.U. Rev. L. & Soc. Change 389 (2004)

Immigrants and the Right to Petition, 78 N.Y.U. L. Rev. 667 (2003)

Immigrant Workers and the Domestic Enforcement of International Labor Rights, 4 U. Pa. J. Lab. & Emp. L. 529 (2002)

The Historical Use of Habeas Corpus and INS v. St. Cyr, 16 Geo. Immigr. L.J. 485 (2002) (with James Oldham)

Introduction: Immigration and Federalism, 58 N.Y.U. Ann. Surv. Am. L. 283 (2002)

Laboratories of Bigotry? Devolution of the Immigration Power, Equal Protection, and Federalism, 76 N.Y.U. L. Rev. 493 (2001)

== See also ==
- Cardona v. Shinseki
- List of law clerks for the second seat of the Supreme Court of the United States
