= Pratik A. Shah =

American lawyer

Pratik A. Shah is an American lawyer and current co-head of Akin Gump's Supreme Court and Appellate Practice. A graduate of Princeton University with highest honors in chemical engineering, and University of California, Berkeley, School of Law, Boalt Hall (class of 2001), Shah clerked for Judge William A. Fletcher of the U.S. Court of Appeals for the 9th Circuit and Stephen G. Breyer of the U.S. Supreme Court in the 2003 Term. Before joining Akin Gump, Shah argued 13 cases in front of the U.S. Supreme Court as an assistant to the Solicitor General, including United States v. Windsor, which made it unconstitutional to withhold federal recognition of same-sex marriages performed in states where it is legal.

== See also ==
- List of law clerks for the second seat of the Supreme Court of the United States
