= Kit Kinports =

American legal scholar

- Born: Mary Kathleen Kinports
- Education: Brown University (BA); University of Pennsylvania (JD)
- Occupation: Law professor
- Known for: Expert on feminism and criminal law

Kit Kinports is an American legal scholar who is Professor of Law and the Polisher Family Distinguished Faculty Scholar at Pennsylvania State University. She has taught there since 2006 and specializes in feminism, criminal law and constitutional law. In 2024, Kinports announced her retirement from Penn State Law after nearly two decades of service.

== Biography ==
Kinports studied at Brown University, where she received a Bachelor of Arts in 1976. She attended the University of Pennsylvania School of Law, serving as editor-in-chief of the University of Pennsylvania Law Review, and graduating with a J.D. in 1980. After law school, she clerked for Judge Abner Mikva of the United States Court of Appeals for the District of Columbia Circuit, and then for Justice Harry Blackmun of the United States Supreme Court, from 1981 to 1982. Following her clerkships, she practiced law in Washington, D.C. as an associate of Ennis, Friedman, Bersoff & Ewing.

In 2006, she joined the faculty of Penn State, having previously taught at the University of Illinois College of Law. In 2005, she explained the Battered Woman's defense in criminal law. In 2010, she commented on the nomination of Elena Kagan to the U.S. Supreme Court. In October 2018, she signed a letter opposing the confirmation of Brett Kavanaugh to the U.S. Supreme Court.

She is co-author of a popular case book, Criminal Law: Cases and Materials, now in its fourth edition. In early 2023, Kinports was invited to contribute as an author to the McCormick treatise on Evidence, hailed as a standard text among law students and scholars.

== Personal life ==
Kinports was previously married to an antitrust scholar and fellow law professor at Dickinson College of Law.

== See also ==
- List of law clerks for the second seat of the Supreme Court of the United States

== Select publications ==
=== Books ===
- Kinports, Kit; Saltzburg, Stephen A.; Diamond, John L.; Morawetz, Thomas; Little, Rory (2017). Criminal Law: Cases and Materials (4th ed.). Carolina Academic Press. ISBN 978-1-5310-0418-7.
- Kinports, Kit; Brown, Mark (2014). Constitutional Litigation Under Section 1983 (3rd ed.). Carolina Academic Press. ISBN 978-0-76989-276-4.

=== Articles ===
- Kinsport, Kit (2018). "Illegal Predicate Searches and Tainted Warrants After Heien and Strieff". Tul. L. Rev. 92: 837.
- Kinsport, Kit (2017). "What Does Edwards Ban?: Interrogating, Badgering, or Initiating Contact?". N. Ky. L. Rev. 43: 359. SSRN 2763240.
- Kinsport, Kit (2016). "Heien's Mistake of Law". Ala. L. Rev. 68: 121.
- Kinsport, Kit (2015). "The Myth of Battered Woman Syndrome". Temple Pol. & Civ. RTS. L. Rev. 24: 313.
- Kinsport, Kit (2010). "Iqbal and Supervisory Immunity". Penn St. L. Rev. 114: 1291.
- Kinsport, Kit (1988). "Defending Battered Women's Self-Defense Claims". Or. L. Rev. Rev. 67: 393.
