= Dan Coenen =

American lawyer

- Born: Dan T. Coenen; Dubuque, Iowa, U.S.
- Education: University of Wisconsin–Madison (BS); Cornell Law School
- Occupation: Lawyer

Dan T. Coenen is an American lawyer, currently the University Professor Emeritus at the University of Georgia School of Law and previously Harmon W. Caldwell Chair in Constitutional Law and the J. Alton Hosch Professor of Law.

== Biography ==
Coenen was born in Dubuque, Iowa, where he attended public schools, and educated at the University of Wisconsin, receiving a B.S. in 1974. In 1978, he graduated from Cornell Law School, where he was Editor-in-Chief of Cornell Law Review. After law school, Coenen clerked for Clement Haynsworth of the United States Court of Appeals for the Fourth Circuit, and then Justice Harry Blackmun of the United States Supreme Court in 1979-80 before entering private practice. In 1987, Coenen began teaching at University of Georgia Law School and was elevated to University Professor in 2005. In 2011, he was named associate dean for faculty development. His research concern is constitutional law.

== See also ==
- List of law clerks for the second seat of the Supreme Court of the United States

== Select publications ==
=== Books ===
- Coenen, Dan (2007). The story of The federalist: how Hamilton and Madison reconceived America. New York: Twelve Tables Press. ISBN 9780974728636.
- Coenen, Dan (2004). Constitutional Law: The Commerce Clause. New York: Foundation Press. ISBN 1587785072.

=== Articles ===
- Coenen, Dan T. (2019). "Free Speech and the Law of Evidence". Duke Law Journal. 68: 639–708.
- Coenen, Dan T. (2018). "Free Speech and Generally Applicable Laws: A New Doctrinal Synthesis". Iowa Law Review. 103: 435.
