= Stanley M. Silverberg =

American lawyer

- Born: 1919; New York City
- Died: November 13, 1953 (aged 34); New York City
- Education: Harvard Law School; City College of New York
- Occupation: Lawyer
- Years active: 1944–1953

Stanley M. Silverberg (1919 – November 13, 1953) was an American lawyer. He worked in the United States Department of Justice under Philip Perlman in the 1940s, before joining the law firm of Samuel Irving Rosenman.

Silverberg attended City College of New York, where he graduated in 1939, and later Harvard Law School, where he was an editor of the Harvard Law Review. He then clerked for Judge Learned Hand at the United States Court of Appeals for the Second Circuit, and Justice Felix Frankfurter at the United States Supreme Court (1943–44).

Silverberg died at Mount Sinai Hospital in Manhattan after a month's illness at age 34.

== See also ==
- List of law clerks for the second seat of the Supreme Court of the United States
