= Hugh Calkins =

American lawyer (1924–2014)

- Born: February 20, 1924; Newton, Massachusetts
- Died: August 4, 2014 (aged 90); Cleveland Heights, Ohio
- Education: Harvard College, Harvard Law School
- Occupations: Lawyer, Educator
- Known for: Legal and education reform
- Spouse: Ann Clark Calkins

Hugh Calkins (February 20, 1924 – August 4, 2014) was an American lawyer and educator, who served as a member of the Harvard Corporation from 1968 to 1985.

== Early life ==
Calkins was born in Newton, Massachusetts in 1924, and went to Phillips Exeter Academy before attending Harvard College. As an undergraduate, he served briefly as president of the Harvard Crimson in 1942. He graduated magna cum laude in mechanical engineering. He joined the United States Army Air Forces and was on the staff at the Guam Air Depot, which provided aircraft maintenance. He served until 1946 and became a captain.

== Career ==
After the war, Calkins returned to Harvard to attend law school, was president of the Law Review, and graduated with enough honors in 1949 to win a job as a law clerk to Learned Hand, then the chief judge of the United States Court of Appeals for the Second Circuit. He spent the following year clerking for Justice Felix Frankfurter on the Supreme Court of the United States.

=== Lawyer ===
In 1951, Calkins moved to Cleveland, where he made a name for himself and worked for the law firm Jones Day. Calkins was active in regard to national legal issues, most notably serving as deputy director of President Eisenhower's Commission on National Goals. He was elected to the Harvard Corporation in 1968, on the basis of work he had done setting long-term goals for the government. His efforts landed him on the master list of Nixon political opponents.

Calkins stepped down from the Harvard Corporation in 1985, and was succeeded by Henry Rosovsky.

=== Educator ===
After retiring from his legal career, Calkins began a second career in public education. He earned a teaching certificate at John Carroll University, spent several years teaching in inner-city Cleveland schools, founded a charter school and ran an organization called Initiatives in Urban Education. He also founded Plan for Action by Citizens for Education (PACE) and served on the Cleveland Board of Education from 1965 to 1969.

== Death ==
Calkins died on August 4, 2014, at the age of 90.

== See also ==
- List of law clerks for the second seat of the Supreme Court of the United States
