= Irving Loeb Goldberg =

American judge (1906–1995)

Senior Judge of the United States Court of Appeals for the Fifth Circuit
- In office January 31, 1980 – February 11, 1995

Judge of the United States Court of Appeals for the Fifth Circuit
- In office July 22, 1966 – January 31, 1980
- Appointed by: Lyndon B. Johnson
- Preceded by: Seat established by 80 Stat. 75
- Succeeded by: Jerre Stockton Williams

Personal details
- Born: Irving Loeb Goldberg; June 29, 1906 Port Arthur, Texas, U.S.
- Died: February 11, 1995 (aged 88) Dallas, Texas, U.S.
- Education: University of Texas at Austin (BA); Harvard University (LLB)

Irving Loeb Goldberg (June 29, 1906 – February 11, 1995) was a United States circuit judge of the United States Court of Appeals for the Fifth Circuit.

== Education and career ==
Born in Port Arthur, Texas, Goldberg received a Bachelor of Arts degree from the University of Texas at Austin in 1926 and a Bachelor of Laws from Harvard Law School in 1929. He was in private practice in Beaumont, Texas in 1929, in Houston, Texas in 1930, and in Taylor, Texas in 1931. He was an in-house counsel at The Murray Company in Dallas, Texas from 1932 to 1934, returning to private practice in Dallas from 1934 to 1942. He was a United States Naval Reserve Lieutenant during World War II from 1942 to 1946. He was thereafter again in private practice in Dallas until 1966, becoming lead name partner at Goldberg, Fonville, Gump & Strauss (now Akin Gump Strauss Hauer & Feld).

== Federal judicial service ==
On June 28, 1966, Goldberg was nominated by President Lyndon B. Johnson to a new seat on the United States Court of Appeals for the Fifth Circuit created by 80 Stat. 75. He was confirmed by the United States Senate on July 22, 1966, and received his commission the same day. He assumed senior status on January 31, 1980, and served in that capacity until his death on February 11, 1995, in Dallas. Judge Goldberg authored the case Zatarains, Inc. v. Oak Grove Smokehouse, Inc. 698 F.2d 786 (5th Cir. 1983), a leading case in trademark law.

== Sources ==
Legal offices
| Preceded by Seat established by 80 Stat. 75 | Judge of the United States Court of Appeals for the Fifth Circuit; 1966–1980 | Succeeded by Jerre Stockton Williams |
