= Clare Huntington =

American legal scholar

Clare Huntington is an American legal scholar specializing in family law, poverty law, and comparative family law. She is the Barbara Aronstein Black Professor of Law at Columbia Law School and previously held the Joseph M. McLaughlin Professorship at Fordham Law School. Huntington’s research focuses on the legal regulation of family relationships, non-marital families, children, and the use of empirical evidence in family law.

== Legal career ==
After graduating from Law School, Huntington served as a law clerk for Denise Cote on the U.S. District Court for the Southern District of New York, Merrick Garland on the U.S. Court of Appeals for the D.C. Circuit, and Supreme Court Justices Harry A. Blackmun and Stephen G. Breyer. She then worked as an attorney-advisor in the Office of Legal Counsel at the U.S. Department of Justice. Huntington began her academic career at the University of Colorado Law School in 2004, where she was the co-founder and coordinator of the Juvenile and Family Law Program.

Huntington joined Fordham Law School in 2011, teaching Family Law, Legislation and Regulation, Poverty Law, and Comparative Family Law, and served as associate dean for research. In 2017, she was awarded the Joseph M. McLaughlin Professorship. In 2023, she joined Columbia Law School as the Barbara Aronstein Black Professor of Law and received the Willis L.M. Reese Prize for Excellence in Teaching in 2025.

== Books ==
Failure to Flourish: How Law Undermines Family Relationships (2014), which discusses how divorce, child welfare, criminal justice, and transportation law can impact families and widen inequality. The book received an honorable mention for the Professional and Scholarly Excellence Award in Law and Legal Studies (2015) and has been reviewed in independent academic journals such as the Journal of Sociology & Social Welfare and Law & Policy.

Social Parenthood in Comparative Perspective (2023) (editor, with Courtney Joslin and Christiane von Bary), which collects essays on social parenthood by nine legal scholars from North America and Europe as well as essays by social scientists. The book has been reviewed in independent academic journals such as the International Journal of Law, Policy and the Family.

== Selected law journal articles ==
- Huntington, C., AI Companions and the Lessons of Family Law, Vol. 110, Minnesota Law Review (2025).
- Huntington, C. & Carbone, J. Fatherhood, Family Law, and the Crisis of Boys and Men, Columbia Law Review, Vol. 124 (2024).
- Huntington, C., Pragmatic Family Law, Harvard Law Review, Vol. 136 (2023).
- Huntington, C. & Scott, E.S. Conceptualizing Legal Childhood in the Twenty-First Century, Michigan Law Review, Vol. 118.
- Huntington, C. The Empirical Turn in Family Law, Columbia Law Review, Vol. 118 (2018).
- Huntington, C. Familial Norms and Normality, Emory Law Journal, Vol. 59 (2010).
- Huntington, C. Repairing Family Law, Duke Law Journal, Vol. 57 (2008).

== Awards and recognition ==
- Willis L.M. Reese Prize for Excellence in Teaching, Columbia Law School (2025)
- Professional and Scholarly Excellence Award, honorable mention (2015), for Failure to Flourish
- Named to the Joseph M. McLaughlin Professorship, Fordham Law School (2017)
