= Vince Chhabria =

American federal judge (born 1969)

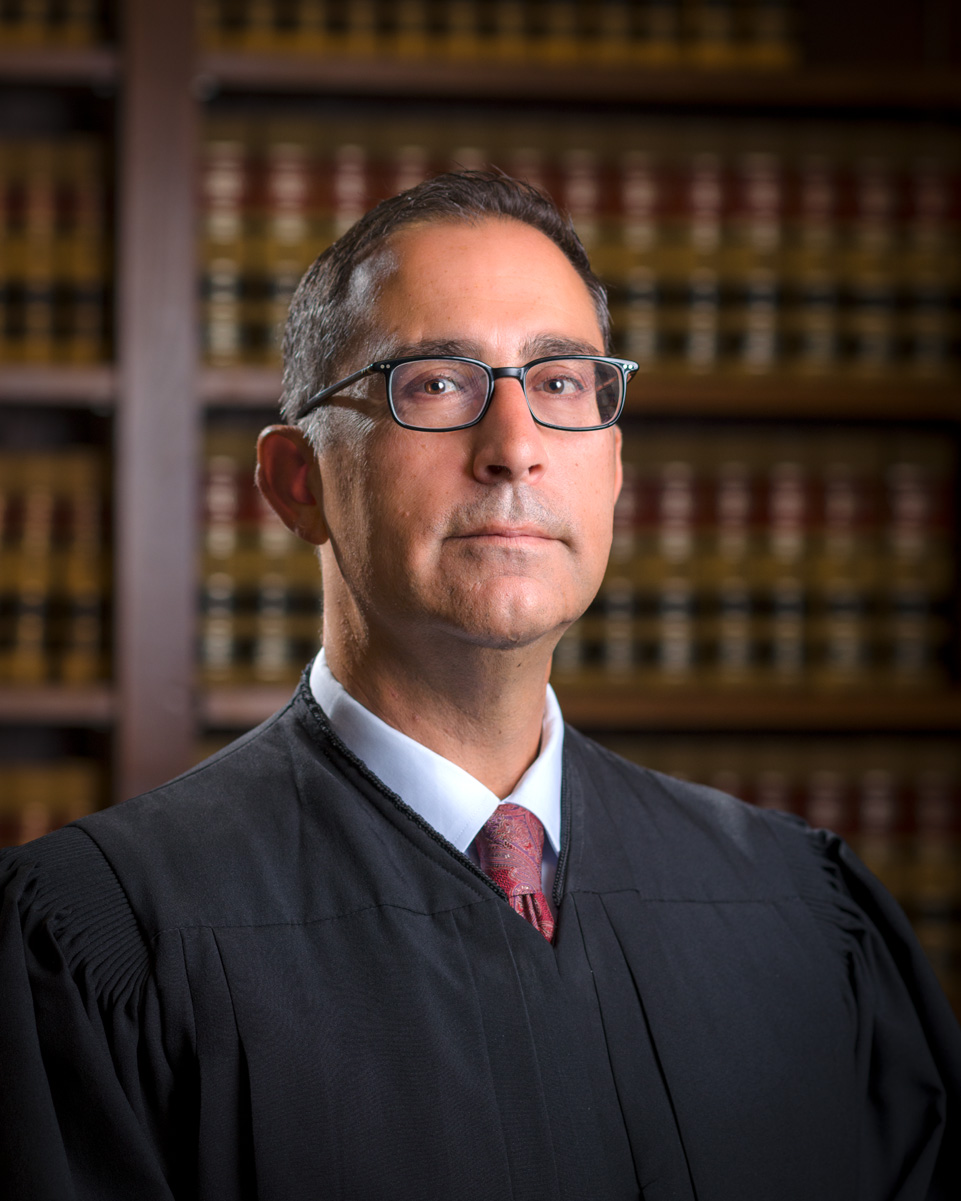
- Chhabria in 2022

Judge of the United States District Court for the Northern District of California
- Incumbent
- Assumed office March 7, 2014
- Appointed by: Barack Obama
- Preceded by: Susan Illston

Personal details
- Born: Vince Girdhari Chhabria; November 27, 1969 (age 56) San Francisco, California, U.S.
- Education: University of California, Santa Cruz (BA); University of California, Berkeley (JD)

Vince Girdhari Chhabria (born November 27, 1969) is an American lawyer and jurist who is a United States district judge of the U.S. District Court for the Northern District of California. He was appointed in 2014 by President Barack Obama. Chhabria was formerly a deputy city attorney at the San Francisco City Attorney's Office.

== Early life and education ==
Chhabria was born in 1969 in San Francisco to a Sindhi immigrant father from Mumbai, India and a French Canadian mother, born in Quebec.

Chhabria graduated from the University of California, Santa Cruz in 1991 with a Bachelor of Arts degree in politics. From 1992 to 1995, he worked as a legislative assistant and campaign staffer for U.S. Representative Lynn Woolsey. He then attended the UC Berkeley School of Law, graduating in 1998 with a Juris Doctor degree and Order of the Coif membership.

== Career ==
He served as a law clerk to Judge Charles Breyer of the United States District Court for the Northern District of California, from 1998 to 1999. He clerked for Judge James R. Browning of the United States Court of Appeals for the Ninth Circuit, from 1999 to 2000.

In 2001, he worked as an associate at the law firm of Keker & Van Nest, LLP. From 2001 to 2002, he clerked for Justice Stephen Breyer of the United States Supreme Court.

From 2002 to 2004, he worked as an associate at the law firm of Covington & Burling, LLP.

From 2005 to 2013, he served in the San Francisco City Attorney's Office, finally as deputy city attorney for government litigation and as the co-chief of appellate litigation.

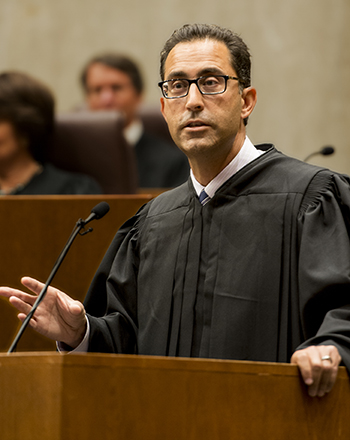
Vince Chhabria taking his seat on the bench

== Federal judicial service ==
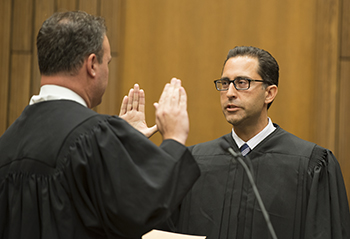
District Judge Vince Chhabria receives the oath of office from Circuit Judge Gregg Costa of the United States Court of Appeals for the Fifth Circuit (June 26, 2014)

On July 25, 2013, President Barack Obama nominated Chhabria to serve as a United States district judge of the United States District Court for the Northern District of California, to the seat vacated by Judge Susan Illston, who assumed senior status on July 1, 2013. On January 16, 2014, his nomination was reported out of committee by a 13–5 vote. On March 5, 2014, the United States Senate invoked cloture on his nomination by a 57–43 vote. His nomination was confirmed later that day by a 58–41 vote. He received his judicial commission on March 7, 2014. Chhabria was the first Indian-American judge to be appointed in California.

=== Notable rulings ===
On October 3, 2016, the U.S. Judicial Panel on Multidistrict Litigation appointed Chhabria to preside over the coordinated and consolidated pretrial proceedings for all product liability lawsuits filed against Monsanto in the federal court system, over failure to warn consumers and regulators that the glyphosate-based herbicide can cause non-Hodgkin's lymphoma.

In 2018, Chhabria was the judge in the case of IMDb.com, Inc. v. Becerra, in which the website IMDb sued parties including California Attorney General Xavier Becerra and the Screen Actors Guild, seeking to counter a California law that barred IMDb from posting the birth dates of actors. Chhabria ruled that the California law was unconstitutional under the First Amendment to the United States Constitution.

In 2022, Chhabria presided over the sentencing of Jose Inez Garcia Zarate, an illegal alien who was acquitted of the 2015 shooting death of Kate Steinle in San Francisco but pleaded guilty to being a felon in possession of a firearm and a person illegally in the country in possession of a firearm. Chhabria sentenced Zarate, who had been in Federal prison for seven years, to time served. In sentencing Zarate, Chhabria warned, “If you return to this country again and you are back in front of me, I will not spare you. Let this be your last warning: do not return to this country.”

On June 25, 2025, Chhabria issued a 40-page decision in Kadrey v. Meta Platforms, Inc., granting Meta partial summary judgment on its fair use defense against copyright infringement claims by 13 authors, including Junot Diaz, Ta-Nehisi Coates, David Henry Hwang, Laura Lippman, and Sarah Silverman, whose books Meta downloaded from shadow libraries and used to train its Llama large language models. He emphasized his ruling's limited scope, writing that "this ruling does not stand for the proposition that Meta's use of copyrighted materials to train its language models is lawful. It stands only for the proposition that these plaintiffs made the wrong arguments and failed to develop a record in support of the right one."

== See also ==
- List of Asian American jurists
- List of law clerks for the second seat of the Supreme Court of the United States

Legal offices
Preceded by Susan Illston	Judge of the United States District Court for the Northern District of California; 2014–present	Incumbent
