= Laura A. Dickinson =

American law professor

- Education: Harvard University (AB); Yale Law School (JD)
- Occupation: Law professor
- Known for: Expert on private security forces law

Laura Anne Dickinson is the Lyle T. Alverson Professor of Law at George Washington University School of Law. She is the author of the 2011 book Outsourcing War and Peace, which discusses the current trend in the United States towards privatization of the military.

== Career ==
Dickinson graduated magna cum laude from Harvard University and completed her juris doctor at Yale Law School in 1996. After graduation, she clerked for Judge Dorothy Wright Nelson of the United States Court of Appeals for the Ninth Circuit. From 2001 to 2008, Dickinson was a member of the faculty at the University of Connecticut School of Law. She moved to Arizona State University in 2008, where she served as director of the Center for Law and Global Affairs at the Sandra Day O'Connor College of Law until 2011. She was also visiting research scholar and visiting professor in the Law and Public Affairs Program at Princeton University in 2006–2007.

In 2008, Dickinson testified before the United States Senate Committee on Homeland Security and Governmental Affairs on the subject of "private security firms operating in war zones" where she noted that "The use of private security contractors and interrogators poses special risks and potentially threatens core values embodied in our legal system including respect for human dignity and limits on the use of force as well as a commitment to transparency and accountability."

Dickinson has served in government, first as senior policy advisor in the State Department's Bureau of Democracy, Human Rights, and Labor, and later as special counsel to the general counsel of the Department of Defense. She is currently a Francis Lieber Scholar at the United States Military Academy at West Point.

== Research and publications ==
She has written about for-profit and non-profit private involvement with various aspects of the US foreign aid budget, including providing emergency humanitarian relief, development assistance, as well as post-conflict reconstruction efforts. Her work also discusses the phenomenon of private entities that have started to perform tasks she describes as "core military functions".

Dickinson is author of the book Outsourcing War and Peace (2011). The book acknowledges that privatization of the military is "likely to be a fact of life for twenty-first century military activity". She notes that a process that began during William Cohen's tenure as Secretary of Defense was significantly expanded under Donald Rumsfeld and his successor Robert Gates. In a review published by The American Journal of International Law Scott Horton wrote that the book "stands alone as the first serious engagement" of the private security contractor industry at the "level of law and legal policy". Stephanie Gosnell Handel, a former Marine officer, writes that Dickinson focuses on "developing a legal, regulatory, and institutional framework to respond to the threat outsourcing poses to public values." Writing in Leiden Journal of International Law, Rain Liivoja notes that the book explains "how the formal legal rules—whether national or international—should not be seen as a panacea and how there are other mechanisms for ensuring respect for human dignity, transparency, and public participation—the public values that are the book's main concern." Law professor Elena Baylis writes that Outsourcing War and Peace is an "engaging book" that "examines a variety of means of potentially holding contractors accountable including retroactive criminal and tort remedies, as well as proactive measures such as changes to contracting terms and practices, steps to increase public participation, and changes to organizational structure within contracting companies."

== Personal life ==
In June 2000 Dickinson married Paul Schiff Berman, a professor at The George Washington University Law School. The ceremony was officiated by Justice Ruth Bader Ginsburg—Berman had previously been one of Ginsburg's law clerks. Berman and Dickinson met while Dickinson was clerking for Justice Harry A. Blackmun and Justice Stephen G. Breyer.

== Awards ==
- July 2017: U.S. Secretary of Defense Medal for Outstanding Public Service

== See also ==
- List of law clerks for the second seat of the Supreme Court of the United States
