= Spin Theater =

Spin Theater was a performance company based in New York City between 1988 and 1995. Under the Artistic Direction of Paul Schiff Berman and Deborah Lewittes, the company created, produced, and performed seven productions at The Performing Garage in SoHo, Saint Mark's Church in the East Village, and on tour. The company was awarded two American Theater Wing Special Citations for Outstanding Stage Design.

Spin Theater was originally known as The Spin Lab and was founded in 1988 by Berman, Lewittes, and Robert Bourne, Robert Brink, Michael Kohler, and Talvin Wilks, all former students at Princeton University. Subsequent Spin Theater Associate Artists included Carol Blanco, Kay Gayner, and David Lawson. Other artists working with the company included: Antonia Chiodo, Betty Anne Cohen, Sean Eden, Douglas S. Hall, Brian C. Haynsworth, Alex Humphreys, Tracy Leipold, Elisabeth S. Rodgers, Dave Shelley, Paul A. Stewart, Zang Toi, Douglas Weston, and David Zabel.

The company first created video sequences for Icehouse, written and directed by Judyie Al-Bilali and presented by the Newark Ensemble Company in the Fall of 1989. The group's first ensemble exploration was The Trial of Uncle S&M, which was developed during a residency at the National Theater Colony in Tannersville, New York, presented as a staged reading at Ensemble Studio Theater in March 1990 and performed as part of The Performing Garage Visiting Artists Series in July 1990.

In 1991 Spin Theater's principal focus was The Richard Foreman Project. The company worked with 350 pages of previously unpublished, unproduced material by the renowned American avant-garde playwright, creating the first original work using Foreman's text not directed by Foreman himself. A first production, The Richard Foreman Project: A Study, was presented at Alice's Fourth Floor Theater in March and April 1991 and then subsequently on tour. In the spring of 1992, the company created an expanded production The Richard Foreman Trilogy, which was presented at the Theater at Saint Mark's Church, where Spin Theatre was a Resident Company until 1995.

In 1991, Spin Theater created a radical reworking of John Jesurun's avant-garde masterwork White Water, as part of The Performing Garage Visiting Artists Series. In 1993–95, the company created two original company-devised pieces, Three Years She Grew and Horses, both of which were presented at the Theater at Saint Mark's Church.
