= Cecillia Wang =

American legal scholar

- Born: 1971 (age 54–55); Oregon, U.S.
- Education: University of California, Berkeley (BA); Yale University (JD)

Chinese name
- Traditional Chinese: 王德棻
Transcriptions
Standard Mandarin
- Hanyu Pinyin: Wáng Défēn
- Wade–Giles: Wang² Te²-fen¹

Cecillia D. Wang (Chinese: 王德棻; pinyin: Wáng Défēn; born 1971) is an American lawyer who is the national legal director of the American Civil Liberties Union (ACLU). Previously she directed the ACLU's Center for Democracy, working on immigrants' rights, voting rights, national security and human rights.

== Early life and education ==
Cecillia Wang was born in Oregon in 1971 to parents who immigrated from Taiwan to the United States in the late 1960s to attend graduate school. She was raised in Fremont, California. She is a U.S. citizen by birth, though her parents were not naturalized U.S. citizens at the time of her birth.

After high school, Wang graduated from the University of California, Berkeley, with a Bachelor of Arts in English and biology in 1992. She then earned her Juris Doctor from Yale Law School in 1995. As a law student at Yale, she was articles editor for The Yale Law Journal and an editor of the Yale Law & Policy Review. Wang's interest in civil rights was influenced by the Supreme Court case Yick Wo v. Hopkins, which she studied as an undergraduate at UC Berkeley.

Wang served as a law clerk to Judge William Albert Norris of the U.S. Court of Appeals for the Ninth Circuit from 1995 to 1996. She then clerked simultaneously for two U.S. Supreme Court justices—Justice Harry Blackmun (after his retirement) and Justice Stephen Breyer—from 1996 to 1997.

== Career ==
Wang served as a fellow with the ACLU from 1997 to 1998. She then joined the federal public defender's office for the Southern District of New York as a staff attorney. She later entered private practice law firm of Keker & Van Nest, LLP in San Francisco.

Wang was appointed to the federal Criminal Justice Act indigent defense panel for the Northern District of California. She then became the director of the ACLU Immigrants' Rights Project. Wang joined the national ACLU as a deputy legal director directing their Center for Democracy.

Wang was an adjunct lecturer in law at Stanford and the University of California at Berkeley teaching immigration law courses.

Wang was mentioned by the legal organization Demand Justice as a potential nominee for a federal judgeship by President Joe Biden.

=== Notable cases ===
- In 2010, Wang was part of the legal team that won a class action lawsuit against a policy and practice of racial profiling and illegal detentions by the Maricopa County Sheriff's Office. The court ruled that Arizona Sheriff Joe Arpaio's department has violated the rights of Latino drivers by racially profiling them.
- In 2011, Wang was part of the legal team in a civil rights lawsuit challenging Alabama's HB 56 anti-immigrant law.
- In 2014, Wang was part of the legal team that won a victory in a class action lawsuit challenging an Arizona constitutional amendment that prohibited bail to suspected undocumented immigrants. The court ruled the amendment violated the Due Process Clause of the Fourteenth Amendment.
- In 2017, Wang was part of the legal team that represented nine Delta Air Lines passengers that sued the Department of Homeland Security and CBP. The passenger's lawsuit claims they were forced to provide identification before de-boarding a domestic flight from San Francisco to New York.
- Nielsen v. Preap (2019)
- In 2026, Wang argued against the revocation of birthright citizenship in Trump v. Barbara, in which the Supreme Court ruled that Executive Order 14160 violated the Fourteenth Amendment.
