= 321 Studios =

321 Studios was a privately held company headquartered in St. Louis, Missouri with a sales office in Berkeley, California. The company was a provider of DVD authoring software.

In February 2004, after a three-year legal battle with several of the major Hollywood studios, the DVDXCopy products which the company sold were deemed by a California court to be in violation of the Digital Millennium Copyright Act (DMCA) in the case 321 Studios v. Metro Goldwyn Mayer Studios, Inc. and were banned from selling DVD Content Scrambling System circumvention software. The company was shut down in August 2004.
