= List of Skull and Bones members =

Skull and Bones entry from the 1948 Yale Banner

Skull and Bones, a secret society at Yale University, was founded in 1832. Until 1971, the organization published annual membership rosters, which were kept at Yale's library. In this list of notable Bonesmen, the number in parentheses represents the cohort year of Skull and Bones, as well as their graduation year. Some news organizations refer to the organization's members as a power elite.

The 2004 United States presidential election was the only time two members of Skull and Bones, George W. Bush and John F. Kerry, ran against each other for the presidency.

There are no official rosters published after 1982 and membership for later years is often speculative.

== Founding members (1832–33 academic year) ==
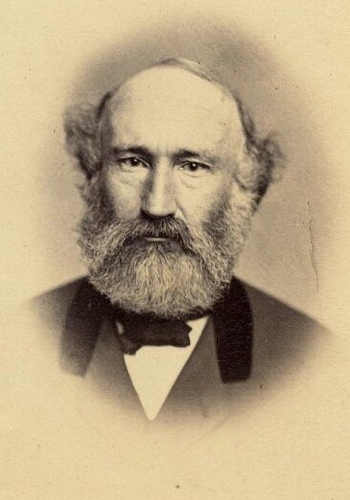
William Huntington Russell, founder of Skull and Bones and the namesake of the society's corporate body, the Russell Trust Association

- Frederick Ellsworth Mather (1833), New York State Assembly (1854–1857)
- Phineas Timothy Miller (1833), physician
- William Huntington Russell (1833), Connecticut State Legislator, Major General
- Alphonso Taft (1833), U.S. Attorney General (1876–1877), Secretary of War (1876), Ambassador to Austria-Hungary (1882) and Russia (1884–1885), father of William Howard Taft
- George Ingersoll Wood (1833), clergyman

== 19th century ==
=== 1830s ===
- Asahel Hooker Lewis (1833), newspaper editor and member of the Ohio General Assembly
- John Wallace Houston (1834), Secretary of State of Delaware (1841–1844), associate judge Delaware Superior Court (1855–1893)
- John Hubbard Tweedy (1834), delegate to the United States Congress from Wisconsin Territory (1847–1848)
- William Henry Washington (1834), Whig U.S. Congressman from North Carolina (1841–1843)
- John Edward Seeley (1835), US Representative from New York
- Thomas Anthony Thacher (1835), Professor of Latin at Yale University (1842–1886)
- Henry Champion Deming (1836), U.S. Representative from Connecticut
- William Maxwell Evarts (1837), U.S. Secretary of State, Attorney General, Senator, grandson of Roger Sherman
- Chester Smith Lyman (1837), astronomer, Yale professor of Industrial Mechanics and Physics
- Allen Ferdinand Owen (1837), US Representative from Georgia
- Benjamin Silliman Jr. (1837), Yale professor of chemistry
- Morrison Remmick Waite (1837), Chief Justice of the U.S. Supreme Court
- Joseph B. Varnum Jr. (1838), Speaker of the New York State Assembly
- Richard Dudley Hubbard (1839), Governor of Connecticut, US Representative

=== 1840s ===
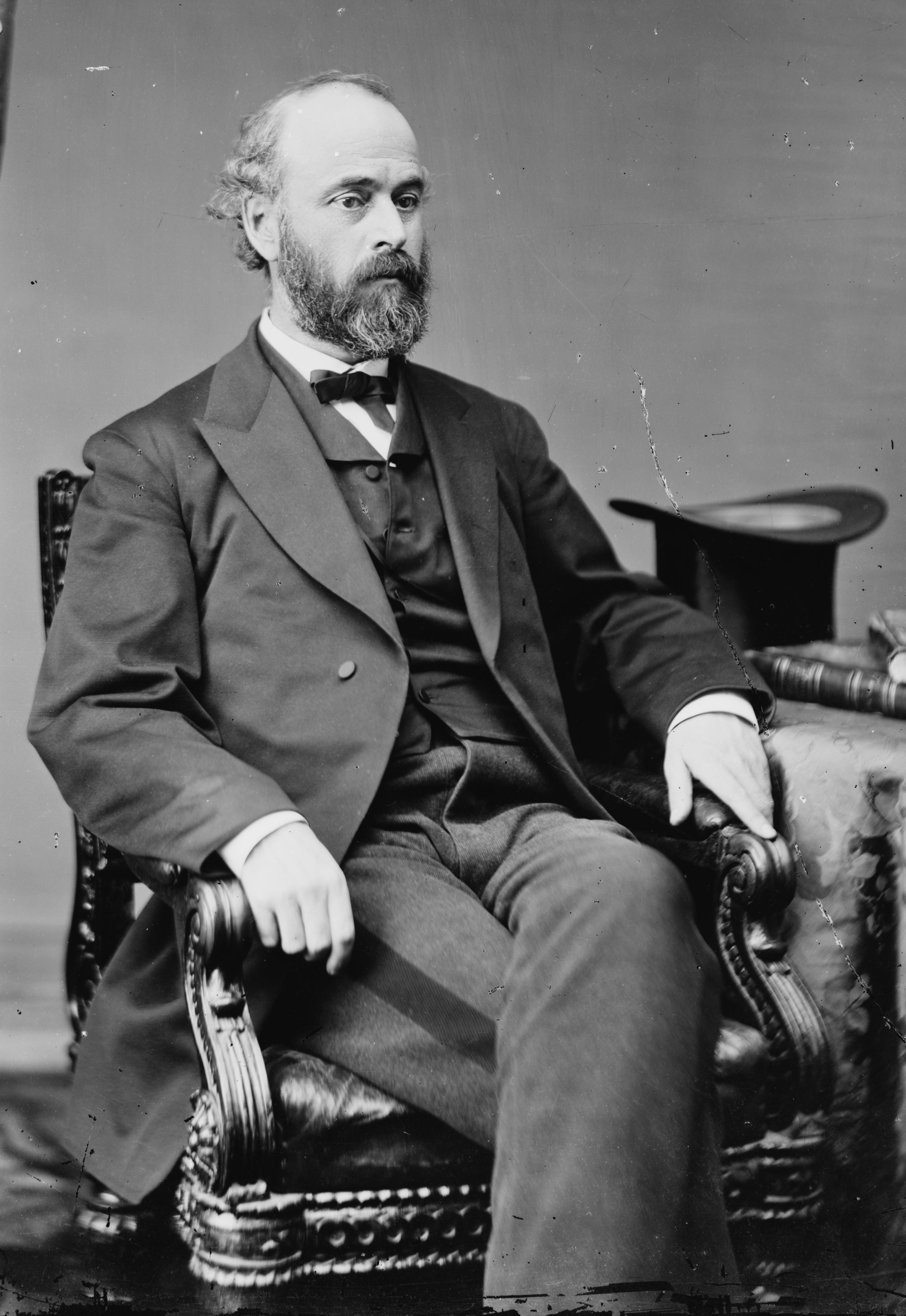
Orris S. Ferry (Bones 1844)

- James Mason Hoppin (1840), professor emeritus at Yale
- John Perkins Jr. (1840), U.S. Representative from Louisiana, and then a senator in the Confederate States Congress
- William Taylor Sullivan Barry (1841), U.S. Representative from Mississippi
- John Andrew Peters (1842), US Representative from Maine
- Benjamin Tucker Eames (1843), US Representative from Rhode Island
- Roswell Hart (1843), US Representative from New York
- Henry Stevens (1843), bibliographer
- Orris Sanford Ferry (1844), US Senator from Connecticut, US Representative, US Brigadier General
- William Barrett Washburn (1844), US Senator, Governor of Massachusetts.
- Constantine Canaris Esty (1845), US Representative from Massachusetts
- Richard Taylor (1845), Confederate General, Louisiana State Senator
- Leonard Eugene Wales (1845), US District Court judge
- Henry Baldwin Harrison (1846), Governor of Connecticut
- Stephen Wright Kellogg (1846), US Representative from Connecticut
- Rensselaer Russell Nelson (1846), US District Court judge
- John Donnell Smith (1847), botanical researcher, Captain in the Confederate Army
- Dwight Foster (1848), Massachusetts Attorney General (1861–64), and a justice of the Massachusetts Supreme Judicial Court (1866–69)
- Augustus Brandegee (1849), US Representative from Connecticut.
- Timothy Dwight V (1849), Yale President (1886–1899)
- Francis Miles Finch (1849), New York Court of Appeals judge, Cornell University professor

=== 1850s ===
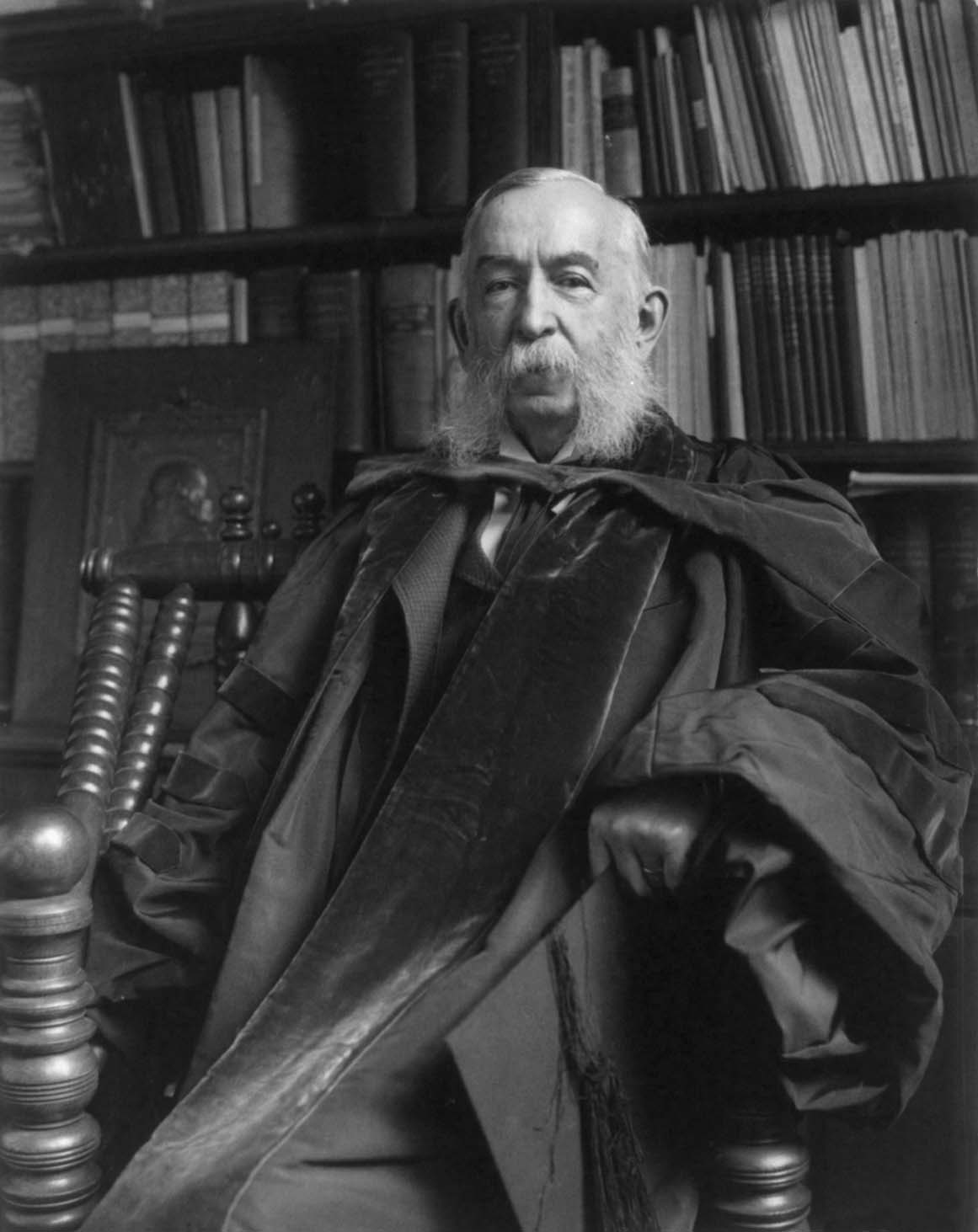
Daniel Coit Gilman (Bones 1852)

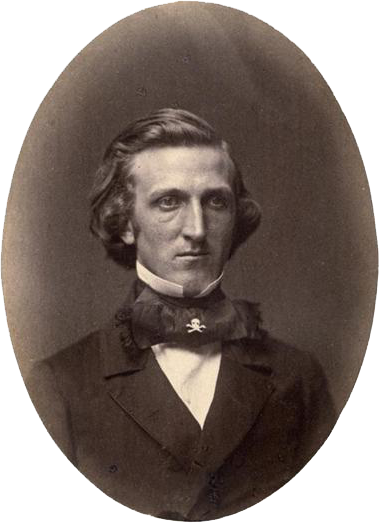
Chauncey Depew wearing a Skull and Bones bowtie

- Ellis Henry Roberts (1850), US Representative from New York
- Richard Jacobs Haldeman (1851), Democratic member of the US House of Representatives from Pennsylvania
- William Wallace Crapo (1852), US Representative from Massachusetts
- Daniel Coit Gilman (1852), president of the University of California, Johns Hopkins University, and the Carnegie Institution, founder of the Russell Trust Association
- George Griswold Sill (1852), Lieutenant Governor of Connecticut
- Andrew Dickson White (1853), cofounder and first President of Cornell University
- Carroll Cutler (1854), President of Western Reserve College, now known as Case Western Reserve University.
- Luzon Buritt Morris (1854), Governor of Connecticut
- William DeWitt Alexander (1855), educator, linguist, and surveyor of Hawaii
- Chauncey Depew (1856), Vanderbilt railroad attorney, US Senator
- Eli Whitney Blake Jr. (1857), American scientist and educator, great-nephew of Eli Whitney
- John Thomas Croxton (1857), Civil War Brigadier General, United States Ambassador to Bolivia
- Moses Coit Tyler (1857), professor of history at Cornell University
- Burton Norvell Harrison (1859), private secretary to Jefferson Davis
- Eugene Schuyler (1859), US Ambassador, author and translator

=== 1860s ===
- Lowndes Henry Davis (1860), US Representative from Missouri
- William Walter Phelps (1860), US Representative from New Jersey
- Simeon E. Baldwin (1861), Governor and Chief Justice of the State of Connecticut, son of Roger Sherman Baldwin
- Anthony Higgins (1861), US Senator
- Edward Rowland Sill (1861), poet, professor at the University of California
- Daniel Henry Chamberlain (1862), Governor of South Carolina
- Franklin MacVeagh (1862), US Secretary of the Treasury
- Henry Farnum Dimock (1863), Whitney family attorney, Director of the Yale Corporation
- William Collins Whitney (1863), US Secretary of the Navy
- Charles Fraser MacLean (1864), New York Supreme Court judge
- John William Sterling (1864), lawyer, co-founder Shearman & Sterling
- John Manning Hall (1866), lawyer, politician, and railroad executive
- George Chandler Holt (1866), US District Court Judge
- Henry Morton Dexter (1867), clergyman, editor, author
- Albert Elijah Dunning (1867), American theologian and author
- Thomas Hedge (1867), US Representative from Iowa
- George Peabody Wetmore (1867), US Senator and Governor of Rhode Island
- Chauncey Bunce Brewster (1868), Bishop of the Episcopal Diocese of Connecticut
- LeBaron Bradford Colt (1868), US Senator and Circuit Court Judge
- Wilson Shannon Bissell (1869), Postmaster General

=== 1870s ===
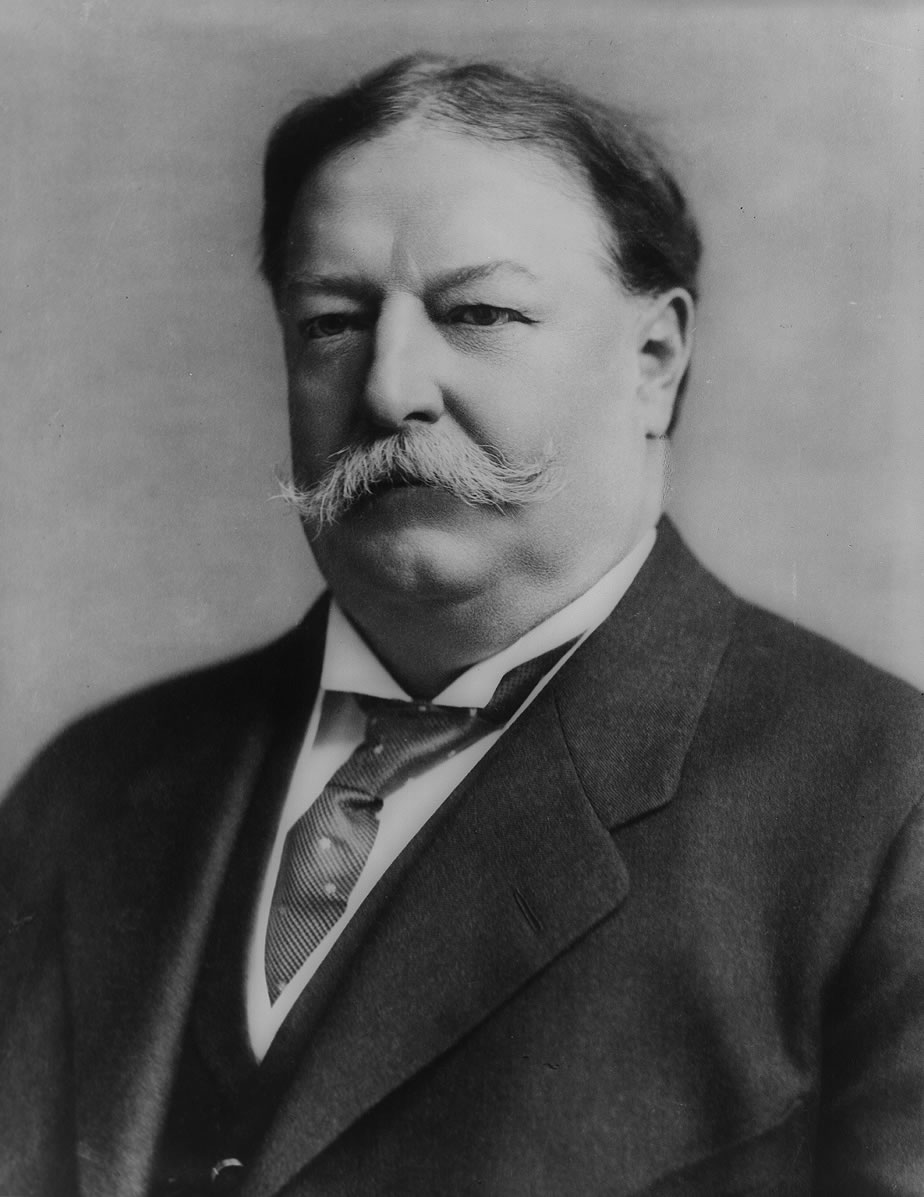
William Howard Taft (Bones 1878)

- William H. Welch (1870), Dean of Johns Hopkins University
- Frederick Collin (1871), judge, mayor of Elmira, New York
- Edwin Forrest Sweet (1871), US Representative from Michigan
- Thomas Thacher (1871), lawyer
- William Kneeland Townsend (1871), US Appeals Court judge
- George Foot Moore (1872), author, Professor of theology at Harvard University
- Theodore Salisbury Woolsey (1872), co-founder of the Yale Review, professor of international law
- Eben Alexander (1873), American scholar, educator, dean and ambassador
- Samuel Oscar Prentice (1873), Chief Justice of the Supreme Court of Connecticut
- Frank Bigelow Tarbell (1873), classicist, professor of Greek and history at Yale, Harvard, and the University of Chicago
- Edward Rudolph Johnes (1873), Attorney and Author
- Almet Francis Jenks (1875), Justice of the New York Supreme Court
- John Patton Jr. (1875), US Senator
- Edward Curtis Smith (1875), Governor of Vermont
- Walker Blaine (1876), United States Department of State official
- Charles Newell Fowler (1876), US Representative from New Jersey
- Arthur Twining Hadley (1876), Yale President 1899–1921
- Roger Sherman Baldwin Foster (1878), lawyer and author
- Tudor Storrs Jenks (1878), author
- William Howard Taft (1878), 27th President of the United States, Chief Justice of the United States, Secretary of War
- Edward Baldwin Whitney (1878), New York Supreme Court justice
- Lloyd Wheaton Bowers (1879), Solicitor General of the United States
- Oliver David Thompson (1879), lawyer, American football player and manager
- Ambrose Tighe (1879), member Minnesota House of Representatives
- Timothy Lester Woodruff (1879), Lieutenant Governor of New York

=== 1880s ===
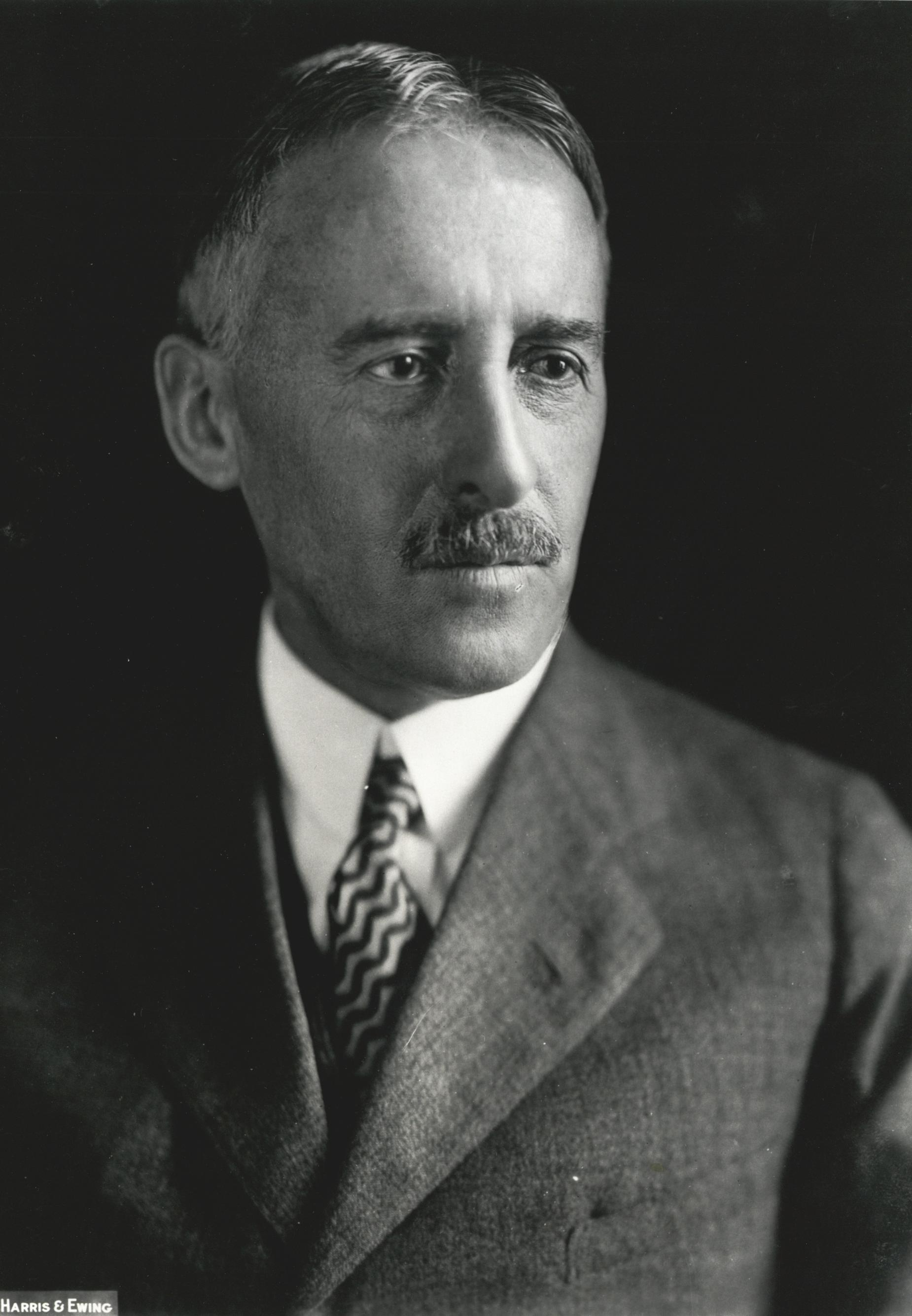
Henry L. Stimson (Bones 1888), US Secretary of War and Secretary of State

- Walter Camp (1880), father of American football and exercise proponent
- Sidney Catlin Partridge (1880) Bishop of Kyoto, Japan, Bishop of the Episcopal Diocese of West Missouri
- Henry Waters Taft (1880), lawyer, Cadwalader, Wickersham & Taft
- Edwin Edgerton Aiken (1881), missionary
- Thomas Burr Osborne (1881), chemist, co-discoverer of Vitamin A
- Benjamin Brewster (1882), Bishop of Maine and Missionary Bishop of Western Colorado
- William Phelps Eno (1882), traffic planner called the "Father of Traffic Safety"
- James Campbell (1882), son of businessman Robert Campbell, Harvard Law 1888.
- Elihu Brintnal Frost (1883), lawyer, president of several early submarine companies
- Eliakim Hastings Moore (1883), mathematician, namesake of the Moore–Penrose pseudoinverse
- Joseph Robinson Parrott (1883), president of the Florida East Coast Railway
- Horace Dutton Taft (1883), educator, founder of the Taft School
- Wilbur Franklin Booth (1884), US federal judge
- Maxwell Evarts (1884), member of the Vermont House of Representatives, attorney for E. H. Harriman
- Frank Bosworth Brandegee (1885), US Representative and Senator
- Alfred Cowles Jr. (1886), lawyer, director Chicago Tribune
- Edward Johnson Phelps (1886), president of Northern Trust Safe Deposit Company
- John Christopher Schwab (1886), Yale professor and librarian
- Clinton Larue Hare (1887), lawyer, college football coach
- George Griswold Haven Jr. (1887), businessman
- Oliver Gould Jennings (1887), financier, member of Connecticut House of Representatives
- William Kent (1887), United States Congressman for California
- Irving Fisher (1888), economist and eugenicist
- Richard Melancthon Hurd (1888), real estate executive
- Amos Alonzo Stagg (1888), college football Hall of Fame coach
- Charles Otis Gill (1888), clergyman, author, college football coach
- Henry L. Stimson (1888), Governor-General of the Philippines, US Secretary of War, US Secretary of State
- Gifford Pinchot (1889), First Chief of U.S. Forest Service
- George Washington Woodruff (1889), College Hall of Fame football coach, Acting Secretary of the Interior and Pennsylvania Attorney General

=== 1890s ===
- Thomas F. Bayard Jr. (1890), US Senator
- Fairfax Harrison (1890), president Southern Railway Company
- Percy Hamilton Stewart (1890), US Representative from New Jersey
- Frederic Collin Walcott (1891), US Senator
- Hugh Aiken Bayne (1892), lawyer Strong & Cadwalader, Adjutant General's Office and War Department during World War I
- Howell Cheney (1892), manufacturer, founded Howell Cheney Technical High School
- Benjamin Lewis Crosby Jr. (1892), law student and football coach
- Clive Day (1892), Professor of economic history at Yale
- Henry S. Graves (1892), co-founder and first Dean of Yale School of Forestry, 2nd chief of the U.S. Forest Service, founding member and 4th president of the Society of American Foresters
- James William Husted Jr. (1892), US Representative
- Pierre Jay (1892), first chairman of the Federal Reserve Bank of New York
- Thomas Lee McClung (1892), Treasurer of the United States, College Football Hall of Fame player
- Edson Fessenden Gallaudet (1893), aviation pioneer
- Thomas Cochran (1894), partner in J.P. Morgan & Company
- John Howland (1894), pediatrician at the Johns Hopkins Hospital
- Ralph Delahaye Paine (1894), journalist and author
- Harry Payne Whitney (1894), investment banker, husband of Gertrude Vanderbilt Whitney
- Frank Seiler Butterworth (1895), member Connecticut State Senate, All-American football player and coach
- Francis Burton Harrison (1895), US Representative from New York, Governor-General of the Philippines
- Frank Augustus Hinkey (1895), zinc smelting business, College Football Hall of Fame player and coach
- Jules Henri de Sibour (1896), architect
- Anson Phelps Stokes (1896), clergyman and Secretary of Yale University (1899–1921)
- Samuel Brinckerhoff Thorne (1896), mining engineer and executive, College Football Hall of Fame
- Henry Sloane Coffin (1897), president of the Union Theological Seminary
- Clarence Mann Fincke (1897), All-America football player
- Amos Richards Eno Pinchot (1897), Progressive leader
- James Wolcott Wadsworth Jr. (1898), U.S. Senator from New York
- William Payne Whitney (1898), Whitney family businessman and philanthropist
- Frederick H. Brooke (1899), architect from Washington, D.C.
- James McDevitt Magee (1899), US Representative from Pennsylvania
- Alfred Gwynne Vanderbilt (1899), member of the Vanderbilt family

== 20th century and beyond ==
=== 1900s ===
- Frederick Baldwin Adams (1900), railroad executive
- Ashley Day Leavitt (1900), Congregational minister, Harvard Congregational Church, Brookline, Massachusetts, frequent lecturer and public speaker
- Percy Rockefeller (1900), director of Brown Brothers Harriman, Standard Oil, and Remington Arms
- Charles Edward Adams (1904), director of the Federal Reserve Bank of New York
- Russell Cheney (1904), American painter and noted portrait artist.
- Thomas Day Thacher (1904), US District Court judge, Solicitor General
- John Gillespie Magee (1906), Yale Chaplain, documenter of the Rape of Nanking
- Foster Rockwell (1906), All-America football player and coach
- William McCormick Blair (1907), American financier, heir to the McCormick reaper fortune
- Hugh Smith Knox (1907), All-America football player
- Samuel Finley Brown Morse (1907), developer and conservationist, All-America football player
- Lucius Horatio Biglow (1908), All-America football player and coach
- Charles Seymour (1908), President of Yale (1937–1951), founding member of The Council on Foreign Relations
- Harold Stanley (1908), co-founder of Morgan Stanley
- Harvey Hollister Bundy (1909), Assistant Secretary of State (1931–1933)
- Allen Trafford Klots (1909), New York City lawyer and president of the New York City Bar Association, partner at Winthrop & Stimson

=== 1910s ===
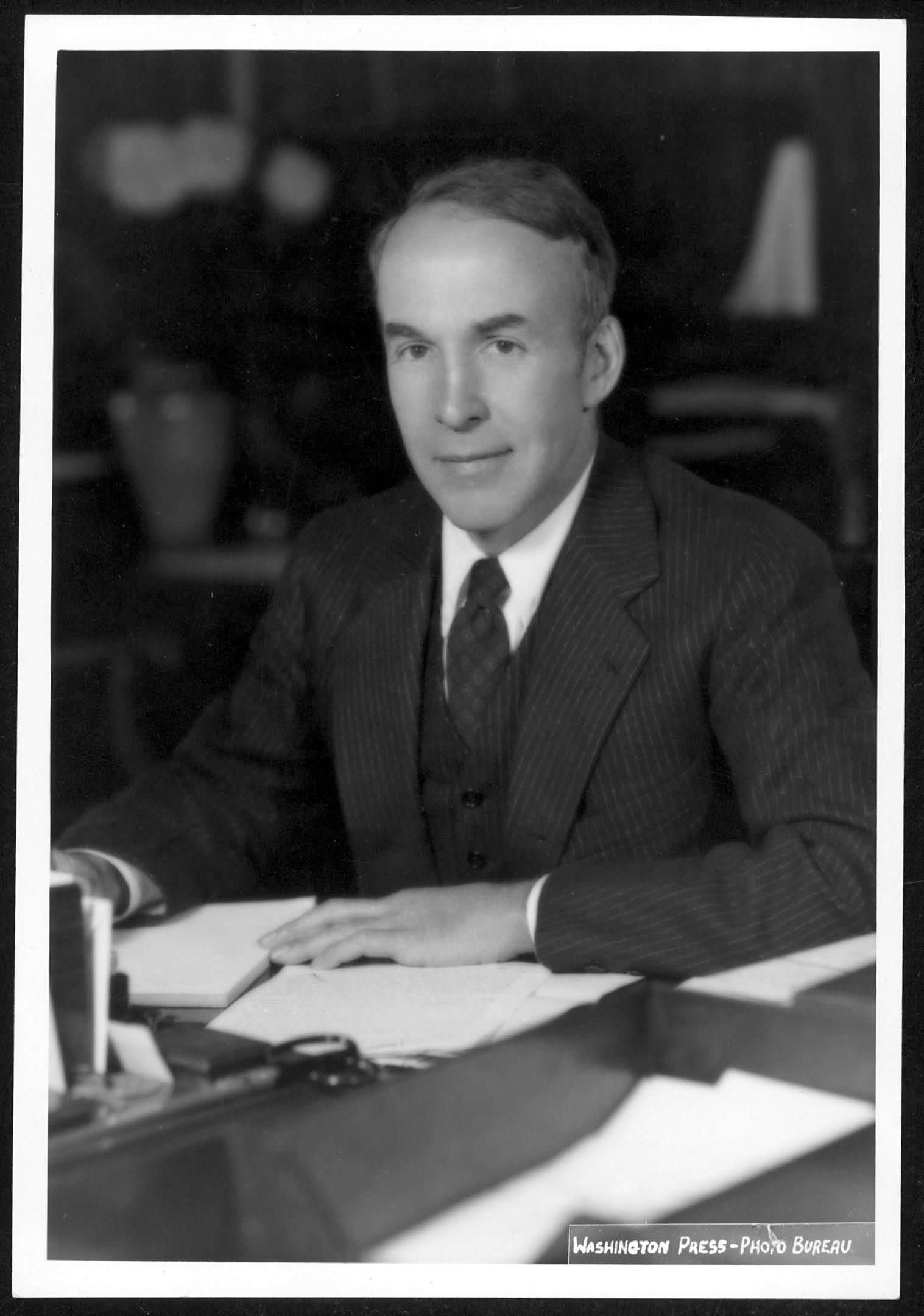
Archibald MacLeish (Bones 1915)

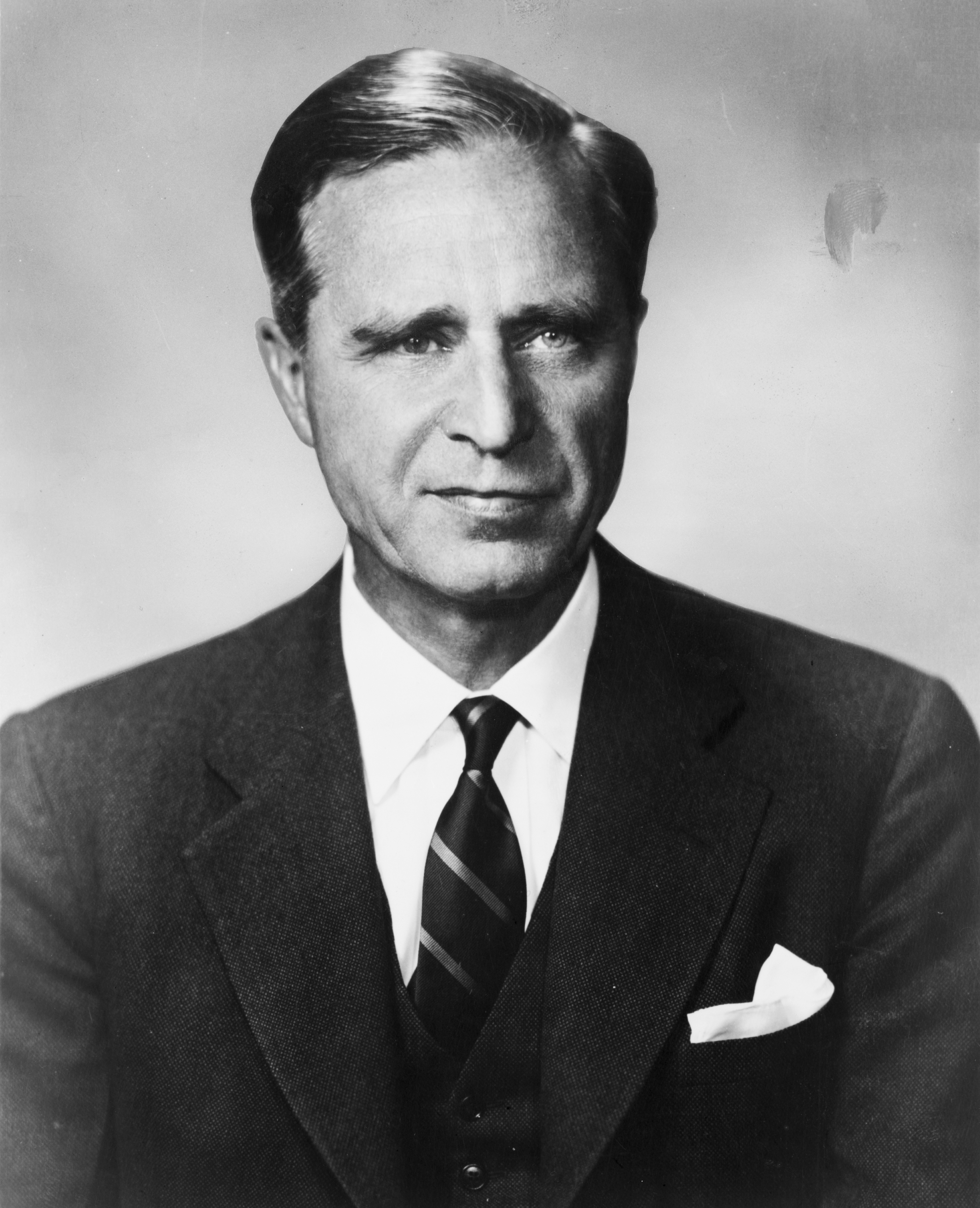
Senator Prescott Bush (Bones 1916)

- Edward Harris Coy (1910), College Football Hall of Fame player
- Albert DeSilver (1910), co-founder American Civil Liberties Union
- George Leslie Harrison (1910), President of the Federal Reserve Bank of New York
- Stephen Philbin (1910), All-American football player, lawyer
- Robert Alphonso Taft (1910), US Senator from Ohio
- Robert Abbe Gardner (1912), two-time U.S. Amateur-winning golfer
- Gerald Clery Murphy (1912), painter
- Alfred Cowles III (1913), economist, founder of the Cowles Commission
- Averell Harriman (1913), businessman, founding partner in Harriman Brothers & Company and later Brown Brothers Harriman & Co., U.S. Ambassador and Secretary of Commerce, Governor of New York, chairman and CEO of the Union Pacific Railroad, Brown Brothers & Harriman, and the Southern Pacific Railroad
- Henry Holman Ketcham (1914), College Football Hall of Fame
- Edwin Arthur Burtt (1915), philosopher
- Archibald MacLeish (1915), poet and diplomat
- Wesley Oler (1916), baseball player and track and field athlete, competed in the 1912 Summer Olympics
- Howard Phelps Putnam (1916), poet
- Donald Ogden Stewart (1916), author and screenwriter, Academy Award-winner for The Philadelphia Story
- Prescott Bush (1917), founding partner in Brown Brothers Harriman & Co., US Senator from Connecticut. His nickname was "The Japanese".
- E. Roland Harriman (1917), co-founder Harriman Brothers & Company
- Harry William LeGore (1917), All-America college football player
- H. Neil Mallon (1917), CEO of Dresser Industries
- Kenneth Farrand Simpson (1917), member of the United States House of Representatives from New York
- Howard Malcolm Baldrige (1918), US Representative from Nebraska
- F. Trubee Davison (1918), WWI aviator, Assistant US Secretary of War, New York State Representative, Director of Personnel at the CIA
- John Chipman Farrar (1918), publisher, founder of Farrar & Rinehart and Farrar, Straus and Giroux
- Artemus Lamb Gates (1918), businessman, US Assistant Secretary of the Navy for Air
- Robert A. Lovett (1918), US Secretary of Defense
- Charles J. Stewart (1918), first chairman of Manufacturers Hanover Trust Company
- Charles Phelps Taft II (1918), son of President William Howard Taft, Mayor of Cincinnati, Ohio
- John Martin Vorys (1918), US Representative from Ohio

=== 1920s ===
- Lewis Greenleaf Adams (1920), architect
- Briton Hadden (1920), co-founder of Time-Life Enterprises
- Francis Thayer Hobson (1920), chair of William Morrow
- David Sinton Ingalls (1920), WWI Navy Flying Ace, Ohio State Representative, Assistant Secretary of the Navy
- Henry Luce (1920), co-founder of Time-Life Enterprises
- Charles Harvey Bradley Jr. (1921), businessman
- Juan Terry Trippe (1921), Founder Pan American Airways
- Stanley Woodward (1922), US Foreign Service officer, State Department Chief of Protocol, US Ambassador to Canada
- John Sherman Cooper (1923), US Senator from Kentucky
- Russell Davenport (1923), editor of Fortune magazine; created Fortune 500 list
- F. O. Matthiessen (1923), historian, literary critic
- Edwin Foster Blair (1924), lawyer
- Walter Edwards Houghton (1924), historian of Victorian literature, compiler of The Wellesley Index to Victorian Periodicals, 1824–1900
- Charles Merville Spofford (1924), lawyer and NATO official
- Marvin Allen Stevens (1925), orthopedic surgeon, College Football Hall of Fame player and coach
- James Jeremiah Wadsworth (1927), diplomat, US Ambassador to the UN
- George Herbert Walker Jr. (1927), financier and co-founder of the New York Mets; uncle to President George Herbert Walker Bush
- John Rockefeller Prentice (1928), lawyer and cattle breeder
- Lanny Ross (1928), singer.
- Granger Kent Costikyan (1929), partner Brown Brothers Harriman
- George Crile Jr. (1929), surgeon

=== 1930s ===
- Charles Alderson Janeway (1930), Professor of Pediatrics at Harvard Medical School
- H. J. Heinz II (1931), heir to H. J. Heinz Company; father of H. John Heinz III
- Lewis Abbot Lapham (1931), banking and shipping executive
- John M. Walker (1931), physician, investment banker
- Frederick Baldwin Adams Jr. (1932), bibliophile, director of the Pierpont Morgan Library
- Samuel Hazard Gillespie Jr. (1932), U.S. Attorney for the Southern District of New York, senior counsel at Davis Polk & Wardwell
- Tex McCrary (1932), journalist, public relations and political strategist to President Eisenhower
- Eugene O'Neill Jr. (1932), professor of Greek literature, son of Eugene O'Neill
- Francis Judd Cooke (1933), composer
- Samuel Carnes Collier (1935), advertising, racecar driver
- Lyman Spitzer (1935), theoretical physicist and namesake of the NASA Spitzer Space Telescope
- Sonny Tufts (1935), actor
- Jonathan Brewster Bingham (1936), U.S. Representative (D-New York)
- Brendan Gill (1936), author and New Yorker contributor
- John Hersey (1936), author
- John Merrill Knapp (1936), musicologist, professor at Princeton University
- William H. Orrick Jr. (1937), United States federal judge, brother of Andrew Downey Orrick
- Potter Stewart (1937), U.S. Supreme Court Justice
- J. Richardson Dilworth (1938), Rockefeller family lawyer
- Clinton Frank (1938), advertising, College Football Hall of Fame and Heisman Trophy-winning player
- Albert Hessberg II (1938), lawyer, first Jewish member of Skull and Bones
- William P. Bundy (1939), State Department liaison for the Bay of Pigs invasion, brother of McGeorge Bundy
- William Welch Kellogg (1939), climatologist, associate director National Center for Atmospheric Research

=== 1940s ===
- McGeorge Bundy (1940), Special Assistant for National Security Affairs; National Security Advisor; Professor of History, brother of William Bundy
- Andrew Downey Orrick (1940), acting chairman of the Securities and Exchange Commission
- Barry Zorthian (1941), American diplomat, most notably press officer in Saigon for 4 1/2 years during Vietnam War
- David Acheson (1943), author, lawyer, son of Dean Acheson
- James L. Buckley (1944), U.S. Senator (R-New York 1971–1977) and brother of William F. Buckley Jr.
- John Bannister Goodenough (1944), solid-state physicist at the University of Texas at Austin and winner of the 2019 Nobel Prize in Chemistry
- Townsend Walter Hoopes II (1944), historian, Under Secretary of the Air Force (1967–69)
- William Singer Moorhead (1944), US Representative from Pennsylvania
- James Whitmore (1944), actor
- John Chafee (1947), U.S. Senator, Secretary of the Navy and Governor of Rhode Island, father of Lincoln Chafee
- Josiah Augustus Spaulding (1947), lawyer, partner Bingham Dana & Gould
- Charles S. Whitehouse (1947), CIA Agent (1947–1956), U.S. Ambassador to Laos and Thailand in the 1970s.
- Thomas William Ludlow Ashley (1948), US Representative from Ohio
- George H. W. Bush (1948), 41st President of the United States, 11th Director of Central Intelligence (CIA), son of Prescott Bush, father of George W. Bush. His Skull and Bones nickname was "Magog".
- William Sloane Coffin (1949), CIA agent (1950–1953), clergyman and peace activist
- Daniel Pomeroy Davison (1949), banker, president United States Trust Corporation
- Tony Lavelli (1949), basketball player
- David McCord Lippincott (1949), novelist and composer
- Charles Edwin Lord II (1949), banker, Vice-chairman of the Export-Import Bank of the United States

=== 1950s ===
- William F. Buckley Jr. (1950), founder of National Review, former CIA officer
- William Henry Draper III (1950), Chair of United Nations Development Programme and Export-Import Bank of the United States
- Evan G. Galbraith (1950), US Ambassador to France; managing director of Morgan Stanley
- Thomas Henry Guinzburg (1950), president Viking Press
- Raymond Price (1951), speechwriter for Presidents Nixon, Ford, and Bush.
- Fergus Reid Buckley (1952), author and public speaker
- Charles Sherman Haight Jr. (1952), Connecticut District Court judge
- Jonathan James Bush (1953), banker, son of Prescott Bush
- William H. Donaldson (1953), appointed chairman of the U.S. Securities and Exchange Commission by George W. Bush; founding dean of Yale School of Management; co-founder of Donaldson, Lufkin & Jenrette investment firm
- John Birnie Marshall (1953), Olympic medal-winning swimmer
- James Price McLane (1953), Olympic medal-winning swimmer
- George Herbert Walker III (1953), US Ambassador to Hungary
- David McCullough (1955), U.S. historian; two-time Pulitzer Prize winner
- Caldwell Esselstyn (1956), Olympic medal-winning rower, physician, author
- Jack Edwin McGregor (1956), Pennsylvania State Senator, founder Pittsburgh Penguins
- R. Inslee Clark Jr. (1957), former Director of Undergraduate Admissions for Yale College; former Headmaster of Horace Mann School
- Linden Stanley Blue (1958), aviation executive
- Robert Morey (1958), Olympic medal-winning rower
- Stephen Adams (1959), American businessman, founder Adams Outdoor
- Winston Lord (1959), Chairman of Council on Foreign Relations; Ambassador to China; Assistant U.S. Secretary of State

=== 1960s ===
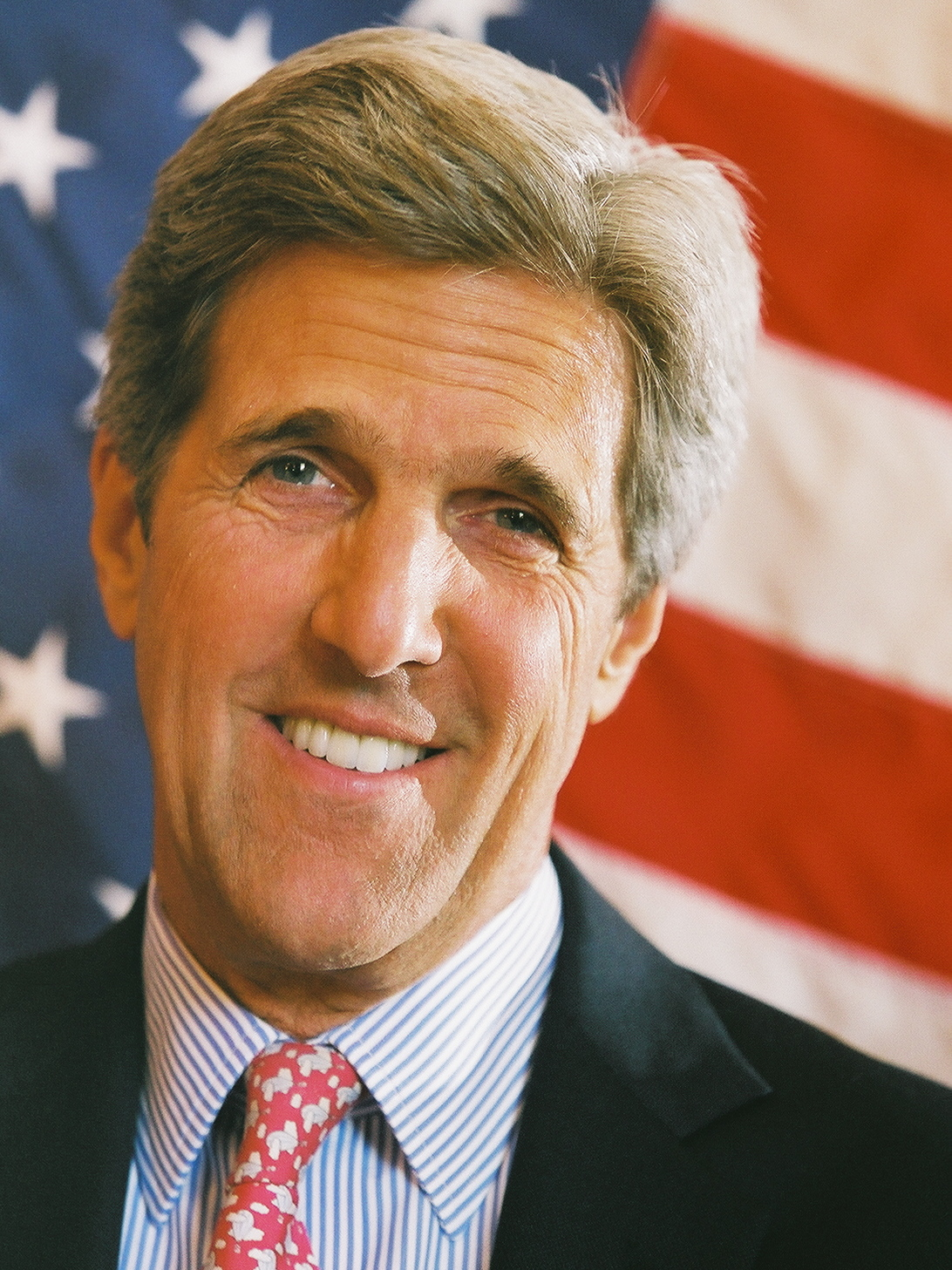
John Kerry (Bones 1966)

- Eugene Lytton Scott (1960), tennis player, founder Tennis Week
- Michael Johnson Pyle (1960), National Football League player
- William Hamilton (1962), New Yorker cartoonist
- David L. Boren (1963), Governor of Oklahoma, U.S. Senator, President of the University of Oklahoma
- Michael Gates Gill (1963), advertising executive, author
- William Dawbney Nordhaus (1963), Sterling Professor of Economics at Yale University and winner of the 2018 Nobel Prize in Economics
- Orde Musgrave Coombs (1965), author, editor, first black member of Skull and Bones
- John Shattuck (1965), US diplomat and ambassador, university administrator
- John Forbes Kerry (1966), 68th United States Secretary of State (2013–2017); U.S. Senator (D-Massachusetts; 1985–2013); Lieutenant Governor of Massachusetts (1983–1985); 2004 Democratic Party Presidential nominee;
- David Rumsey (1966), founder of the David Rumsey Map Collection and president of Cartography Associates
- Frederick Wallace Smith (1966), founder of FedEx
- David Thorne (1966), United States Ambassador to Italy
- Victor Ashe (1967), Tennessee State Senator and Representative, Mayor of Knoxville, Tennessee, US Ambassador to Poland
- Roy Leslie Austin (1968), appointed ambassador to Trinidad and Tobago by George W. Bush
- George W. Bush (1968), grandson of Prescott Bush; son of George H. W. Bush; 46th Governor of Texas; 43rd President of the United States. His nickname was either "Gog" or "Temporary".
- Rex William Cowdry (1968), Acting Director National Institute of Mental Health (1994–96)
- Robert McCallum Jr (1968), Ambassador to Australia
- Don Schollander (1968), developer; author; US Olympic Hall of Fame inductee; four-time Olympic Gold medallist swimmer
- Brian John Dowling (1969), National Football League player, inspiration for B.D. in Doonesbury
- Stephen Allen Schwarzman (1969), co-founder of The Blackstone Group
- Douglas Preston Woodlock (1969), US federal judge

=== 1970s ===
- Charles Herbert Levin (1971), actor
- George E. Lewis (1974), trombonist and composer
- Christopher Taylor Buckley (1975), author, editor, chief speechwriter for Vice President George H. W. Bush
- Robert Curtis Brown (1979), American Film, Television and Stage Actor

=== 1980s ===
- Robert William Kagan (1980), foreign policy writer
- Michael Cerveris (1983), American actor, singer, and guitarist
- Earl G. Graves Jr. (1984), president of Black Enterprise
- Edward S. Lampert (1984), founder of ESL Investments; chairman of Sears Holdings Corporation
- James Emanuel Boasberg (1985), judge, United States District Court for the District of Columbia
- Steven Mnuchin (1985), United States Treasury Secretary
- Paul Giamatti (1989), American actor and producer; son of A. Bartlett Giamatti, President of Yale 1978-86

=== 1990s to present ===
- Dana Milbank (1990), author and columnist at The Washington Post
- Austan Goolsbee (1991), staff director to and chief economist of President Barack Obama's Economic Recovery Advisory Board
- Angela Buchdahl (1994), first East-Asian American ordained Rabbi and Chief Rabbi of Central Synagogue
- Pathorn Srikaranonda (1995), composer
- Tali Farhadian Weinstein (1997), attorney, professor, and former candidate for New York County District Attorney
- Noah P. Hood (2008), justice, Michigan Supreme Court
