= Edward Phelps =

Edward Phelps may refer to:

- Edward H. Phelps (1829–1863), officer in the Union Army during the American Civil War
- Edward John Phelps (1822–1900), American lawyer and diplomat
- Edward Johnson Phelps (1863–1938), president Northern Trust Safe Deposit Company
- Ed Phelps (1879–1942), American Major League Baseball player
- Edward Phelps (mayor) (1861–1931), businessman and politician; mayor of Laurel, Maryland, 1895–1902
- Edward Elisha Phelps (1803–1880), American physician
