= Phelps Putnam =

American poet

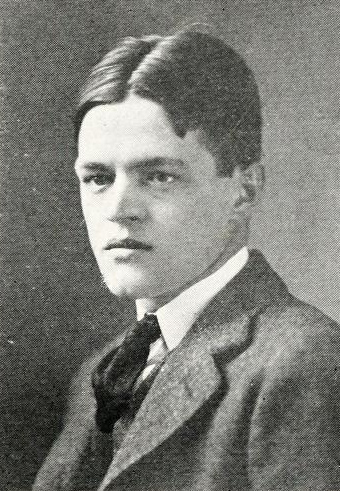
H. Phelps Putnam, Yale College class of 1916

Howard Phelps Putnam (1894 – 1948) was an American poet who published two books, Trinc and The Five Seasons.

== Biography ==
Phelps Putnam was born in Massachusetts in 1894 and attended Phillips Exeter Academy. He enrolled at Yale University where he was a member of the secret society Skull and Bones and was among the "Renaissance" generation of talented Yale-educated writers (which includes alumni such as Stephen Vincent Benét, Henry R. Luce, Archibald MacLeish, Cole Porter, and Thornton Wilder).

Following graduation Putnam traveled to Europe and worked a series of odd jobs including a brief period as an assistant editor for the Atlantic Monthly Press and writing advertising copy for an insurance company. Putnam's first book of poems, Trinc, Rabelaisian for drink, was published in 1927. Following Trinc Putnam set to work on an epic, to be titled The Earthly Comedy. In 1930 Putnam was awarded a Guggenheim Fellowship and the following year he published The Five Seasons (1931). This volume marks the beginning of Putnam's work towards producing The Earthly Comedy, however, Putnam died in 1948 before completing his epic, perhaps thwarted by his ill health (asthma and alcoholism) and the paralyzing ambition of his plans. As F.O. Matthiessen acknowledges in his essay “To the Memory of Phelps Putnam” “he sketched a poem too vast ever to be able to shoulder the weight of writing it”. Putnam wrote little in his later years, which largely consists of poetry published in various magazines and lyrics for a musical collaboration with Harl McDonald entitled Songs of Conquest: Cycle for Chorus of Mixed Voices (1937).

Putnam's love life appears to have superseded his poetic reputation. Twice married (to Ruth Peters and Una Fayerweather) Putnam had numerous affairs, including trysts with Katharine Hepburn and painter Russell Cheney. In her autobiography Me Hepburn writes of Putnam:

"I took one look at him and I was stricken with whatever it is that strickens one at once and for no reason when one looks at a member of the opposite sex. He absolutely fascinated me. I flew up onto a pink cloud [ . . . ].”

== Bibliography ==
Trinc. New York: New York: Doran, 1927.
The Five Seasons. New York: Scribner, 1931.
With Harl McDonald. Songs of Conquest: Cycle for Chorus of Mixed Voices. Philadelphia: Elkan-Vogel, Rev. ed. 1939.
