= Henry D. Abelove =

American academic and literary scholar

Henry Abelove
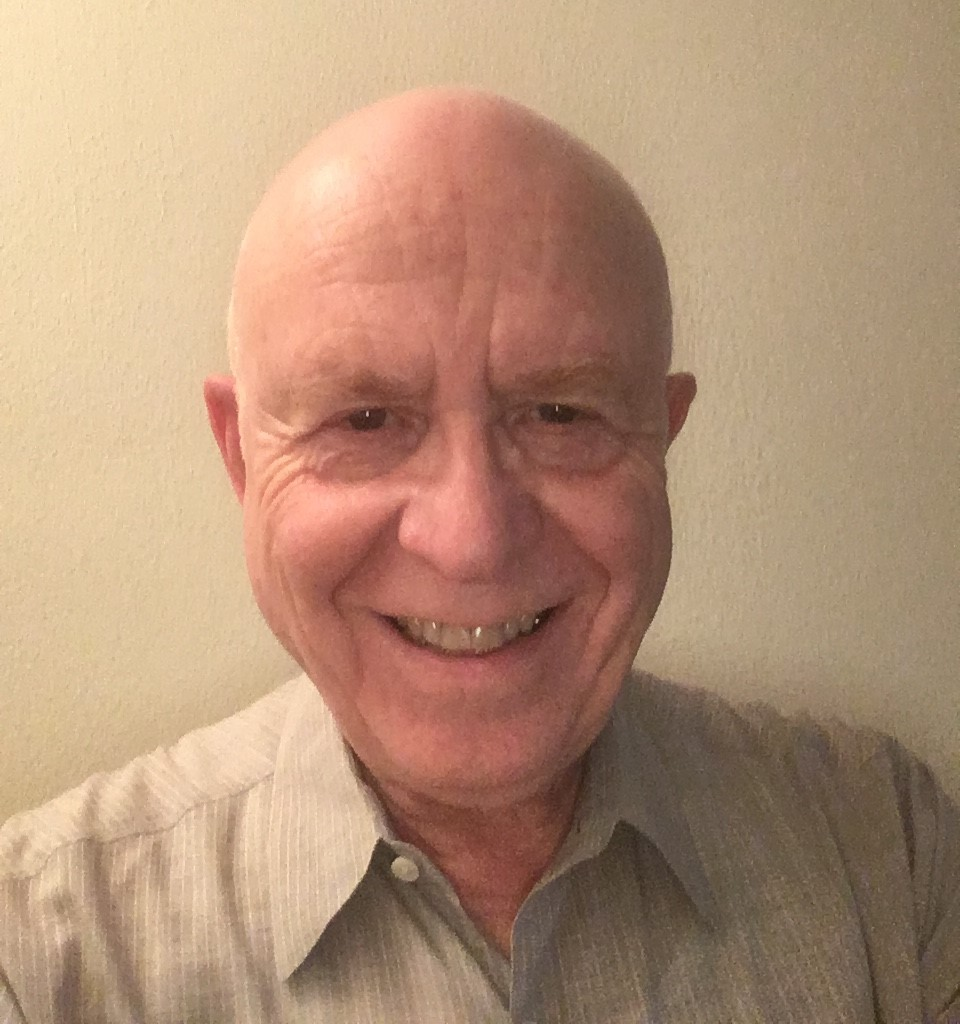
- Abelove in 2021
- Born: 1945 (age 80–81); Montgomery, Alabama, United States
- Education: Harvard University (BA); Yale University (PhD)
- Occupations: Academic, literary scholar, historian
- Employer: Wesleyan University

Henry D. Abelove (born 1945) is an American historian and literary critic. Most of his writings focus on the history of sex during the modern era, and he is widely considered to be an important figure in the development of gay and lesbian studies and queer theory. He is best known for his groundbreaking books The Evangelist of Desire: John Wesley and the Methodists (Stanford University Press, 1990) and Deep Gossip (University of Minnesota Press, 2003) along with The Lesbian and Gay Studies Reader (Routledge, 1993) (co-edited with Michele Aina Barale and David Halperin) which codified the fields of gay and lesbian studies and queer theory and provided them with their first teaching anthology.

== Early life ==
He was born in 1945 in Montgomery, Alabama, to Bernice Kasover Abelove, a homemaker, and to Leo Abelove, a grocer. When he was still a child, the family moved to Utica, New York, where he attended public schools and the religious school of Utica's Temple Beth-El. He graduated from Harvard University with an AB, magna cum laude, in history in 1966. He received a PhD in history from Yale University in 1978.

== Career ==
He spent most of his professional career on the faculty of Wesleyan University in Middletown, Connecticut. He began there in the history department, but in 1991 he switched his affiliation to the English department, where he remained until he retired in 2012. At Wesleyan he also directed the Center for the Humanities from 2000 until 2003 and again from 2004 until 2006. He regarded classroom teaching as his primary work, and he taught courses on more than a dozen topics apart from queer theory. These included Jewish history in the diaspora, Thoreau's Walden, the Enlightenment, and poetry and politics in 20th-century New York City. He won Wesleyan's Binswanger Award for Excellence in Teaching in 1995. During and after his years at Wesleyan, he occasionally took up visiting appointments. He served as visiting associate professor of history at Brown University in 1990; as distinguished visiting professor of English at the University of Alberta in 1995; as the Stanley Kelly, Jr. Visiting Professor for Distinguished Teaching at Princeton University in 2003–04; as the Fulbright Senior Specialist at the University of Antwerp in 2008; and, in 2012, following his retirement from Wesleyan University, as visiting professor of English at New York University. He also served as the inaugural F.O. Matthiessen Visiting Professor of Sex and Gender at Harvard University, the first endowed named chair in LGBT studies in the country.

During his professional career, he won a variety of grants and awards including fellowships from the Woodrow Wilson Foundation, the Danforth Foundation, the University of Utah Humanities Center, the John Simon Guggenheim Memorial Foundation, the Institute for Advanced Study, Princeton, N.J., and the Humanities Research Centre at the Australian National University. The Lesbian and Gay Studies Reader won the Lambda Literary Prize in 2004.

== Personal life ==
Abelove is gay and has long been involved in LGBT activism, and was awarded the Michael Lynch Service Prize for Activism in Queer Studies Scholarship in 2008. He lives in New York City. He has a younger sister who lives in Maryland.

== Selected works ==
=== Books ===
- Deep Gossip (University of Minnesota Press, Minneapolis, Minnesota: cloth-covers, 2003; paperback, 2005)
- The Lesbian and Gay Studies Reader, edited by Henry Abelove, Michele Aina Barale, and David Halperin (Routledge: cloth-covers and paperback, 1993)
- The Evangelist of Desire: John Wesley and the Methodists (Stanford University Press, Stanford, California: cloth-covers, 1990; paperback, 1992)
- Visions of History, edited by Henry Abelove, Elizabeth Blackmar, Peter Dimock, and Jonathan Schneer (Pantheon: cloth-covers and paperback, 1983) (University of Manchester Press, U.K., 1984; cloth-covers and paperback) excerpted and translated into German in Freibeuter, Verlag Klaus Wagenbach, #24 (Berlin, 1985)

=== Essays ===
- "'Freud, Male Homosexuality, and the Americans' Revisited: A Brief Contribution to the History of Psychoanalysis," Studies in Gender and Sexuality, vol. 17, #2, 2016'
- "How Stonewall Obscures the Real History of Gay Liberation," The Chronicle of Higher Education (June 26, 2015) (translated in Chinese by TianHui Ni, edited by Josephine Ho, Coolloud, September 21, 2018)
- "The Bar and the Board: for Eve Kosofsky Sedgwick," GLQ Vol. 17, #4, 2011
- "A Cure for Empire," Raritan (Summer 2010, Vol. XXX, no. 1)
- "Yankee Doodle Dandy," Massachusetts Review, Spring/Summer 2008, vol. 49, no. 1 and 2
- "John Wesley's Plagiarism of Samuel Johnson and Its Contemporary Reception," Huntington Library Quarterly 59, #1 (dated as for 1996; published in 1997)
- "The Queering of Lesbian/Gay History," Radical History Review #62 (Spring 1995)
- "The Politics of the 'Gay Plague': AIDS as a United States Ideology," in Michael Ryan and Avery Gordon, eds., Body Politics (Westview Press, Boulder, Colorado 1994)
- "From Thoreau to Queer Politics," Yale Journal of Criticism, VI, #2 (1993)
- "Some Speculations on the History of Sexual Intercourse During the Long Eighteenth Century in England," Genders, VI (November, 1989) [reprinted, with some revision, in Andrew Parker et al., eds., Nationalisms and Sexualities (Routledge: 1991)]; [reprinted in Judith Farquhar and Margaret Lock, eds. Beyond the Body Proper: Reading the Anthropology of Material Life (Duke University Press, 2007)]
- "The Sexual Politics of Early Wesleyan Methodism," Disciplines of Faith: Religion, Patriarchy, and Politics, eds., by James Obelkevich, Lyndal Roper, and Raphael Samuel (Routledge, Kegan Paul, London and New York: 1987)
- "Freud, Male Homosexuality, and the Americans," Dissent (Winter, 1985–1986) [reprinted in Henry Abelove, Michele Aina Barale, and David Halperin, eds., The Lesbian and Gay Studies Reader, Routledge, 1993] [trans. Into Italian by Maria Plastino as "Freud, l'homosessualita maschile, e gli americani," Rivista adi Psicoterapia e Sciencza Umane, Milan, Italy, IV (1985)] [trans. Into Hebrew by Yair Kedar and Alon Harel in Tat-Tarbut, l, Tel-Aviv, Israel, Summer, 1995] [translated into Spanish by Elbio Raul Degracia as "Freud, la homosexualidad masculina y los Americanos," in Grafias de Eros, July 2000, Buenos Aires, Argentina]
- "Reading the People," Berkshire Review, XIX (1984)
- "E.P. Thompson, The Poverty of Theory," History and Theory, XXI, 1 (February, 1982)
- "The Basis of Wesley's Influence: Deference," Wesleyan Library Notes (No. 16, 1982)
- "George Berkeley's Attitude to John Wesley: The Evidence of a Lost Letter," Harvard Theological Review, LXX, 1–2 (January–April, 1977)
- "Jonathan Edwards's Letter of Invitation to George Whitefield," William and Mary Quarterly, XXIV, 3 (July, 1972)
