= Harvard Gender and Sexuality Caucus =

American LGBT non-profit organization

- Abbreviation: HGSC
- Formation: 1984; 42 years ago
- Type: Nonprofit
- Location: Cambridge, Massachusetts, United States
- Affiliations: Harvard University; Radcliffe College
- Website: Official website
- Formerly called: Harvard Gay and Lesbian Caucus (1984-2013)

The Harvard Gender and Sexuality Caucus (HGSC) is an American non-profit organization of lesbian, gay, bisexual and transgender (LGBT) Harvard University and Radcliffe College alumni/ae, faculty, staff and students. Before 2013 the name of the organization was the Harvard Gay and Lesbian Caucus (HGLC). In 2009 members and supporters of the HGSC funded an LGBT studies endowed professorship at Harvard, believed to be the first of its kind in the United States.

== History ==
Formed in 1984 to pressure Harvard University to include sexual orientation in its non-discrimination policy, the HGLC's influence resulted in the President and Fellows of Harvard College's 1985 creation of a new University-wide anti-discrimination policy that included discrimination on the basis of sexual orientation. After lobbying from the HGLC, in 1993 Harvard began to offer benefits to the same-sex partners of its employees.

The HGLC notes its current purposes to include advocating "a non-discriminatory and diverse academic, living and working environment at Harvard" and maintaining and expanding a network of LGBT alumni/ae. The organization also awards an annual HGLC Public Service Fellowship, and honors Harvard affiliates for contributions to the LGBT community.

In June 2009, Harvard announced that it would establish an endowed chair in LGBT studies called the F. O. Matthiessen Visiting Professorship of Gender and Sexuality, funded by a $1.5 million donation from the members and supporters of the Harvard Gay & Lesbian Caucus. Believing the post to be "the first professorship of its kind in the country," Harvard President Drew Gilpin Faust called it “an important milestone.”
