= Phineas Timothy Miller =

American physician

Phineas Timothy Miller (May 3, 1810 – February 21, 1850) was an American medical doctor and a founding member of Yale's Skull and Bones Society.

== Early life ==
Phineas Timothy Miller, son of Samuel and Mary (Gilbert) Miller, of Middletown, Connecticut, was born on 3 May 1810. e in 135, And along with notable classmates such as Alphonso Taft, he helped to found Skull and Bones in 1832.

In 1841 he was made the Director of the New Haven Hospital.

He continued to practice his profession as a physician until 1849, with the exception of a short time spent operating an apothecary in New York City.

In January, 1849, he sailed from this city in the schooner Montague with a company bound for California. While in the mining region he was seized with chronic dysentery, and after being much enfeebled he embarked for home on the ship Clarissa Perkins. He died on shipboard, on February 21, 1850, in his 40th year, and was buried at sea.

== Family ==
He married, in Rocky Hill parish, in Wethersfield, Connecticut, on August 31, 1836, Elvira, daughter of Henry and Anna (Butler) Whitmore, who survived him. Their children were three daughters and a son. The son and one daughter died in infancy.
