= E. E. Aiken =

American minister

Edwin Edgerton Aiken
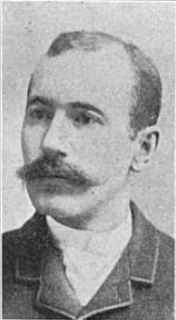
- Edwin Edgerton Aiken
- Born: March 1, 1859; Newington, Connecticut, US
- Died: January 5, 1951 (aged 91)
- Occupation: Author
- Spouses: Maud Lockwood (m. 1892; died 1899) Rose Ethel Merrill (m. 1902)

Edwin Edgerton Aiken (March 1, 1859 – January 5, 1951) was an American Congregationalist minister and author who spent over four decades as a missionary and educator in China.

Born in Newington, Connecticut, he graduated from Yale University in 1881, where he was Phi Beta Kappa and a member of Skull and Bones. The following year he published The Secret Society System. While not naming Skull and Bones, he objected to the exclusiveness of societies and fraternities. He wrote: "Real friendship is not the result of formal compacts and societies; the spiritual bond is the true one, covenants of friendship are unnecessary, compacts are made for different ends."

He earned his Bachelor of Divinity from Yale Divinity School in 1884. In 1885 he began his missionary work in China with the American Board of Commissioners for Foreign Missions, serving in Beiping (1885–90), Tianjin (1892–99), Baoding (1902–11), and Yichang (1917–21, 26–27). From 1912 to 1917 he was on the committee that revised the Mandarin-language translation of the Bible. When finally published, the Mandarin Union Version superseded earlier versions and became the translation of choice for Chinese Christians into the 21st century. He was also editor of the Peking Union Church Bulletin from 1928 to 1943, was a member of the Peking Oriental Society and held a number of teaching posts.

Aiken and his wife left China in 1943 during the Second Sino-Japanese War. After a four-month internment by the Japanese, they were evacuated on the MS Gripsholm.

He was married twice, first in 1892 to Maud Lockwood, who died of scarlet fever in Tianjin in 1899, and second in 1902 to Rose Ethel Merrill. With his first wife he had two sons, Reverend Edwin Edgerton Aiken Jr. and George Lockwood Aiken, and a daughter, Margery, and with his second wife a daughter, Lura Susan Aiken, wife of Erhart Friedrich Petersen.
