= Edward Elisha Phelps =

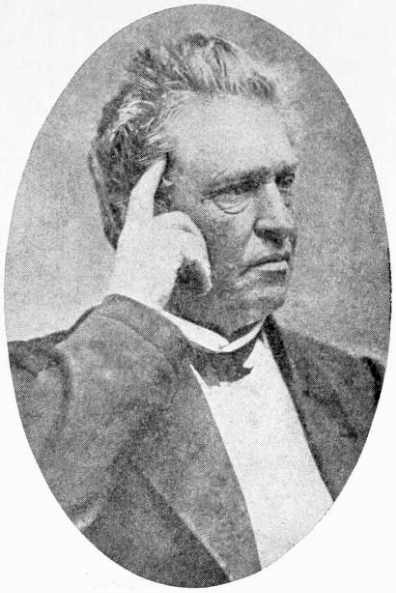
- Born: April 24, 1803; Peacham, Vermont, US
- Died: November 26, 1880 (aged 77); Windsor, Vermont, US
- Education: Yale School of Medicine
- Occupation: Physician
- Spouse: Phoebe Foxcroft Lyon (m. 1830)

Edward Elisha Phelps (April 24, 1803 – November 26, 1880) was an American medical doctor.

== Early life and education ==
Edward Elisha Phelps was born in Peacham, Vermont on April 24, 1803. His father, Dr. Elisha Phelps, removed to Windsor soon after his birth.

He was a student for two years in medicine with Nathan Smith, then a resident of New Haven, Connecticut, but early in life settled in Cornish, New Hampshire, and at Hanover. He graduated in medicine at Yale, in the class of 1825.

== Health and personal life ==
Impaired health led him to go South for a time, during which he used his mathematical knowledge acquired at Norwich, assisting in the survey of the Dismal Swamp Canal, also following up on his studies in natural science, particularly in botany. In 1828, he commenced his professional life in Windsor, when on September 4, 1830, he married Phoebe Foxcroft Lyon, of Boston, Massachusetts. Both her and their daughter outlived him.

== Professional career ==
In 1835 he was elected to the Professorship of Anatomy and Surgery in the medical school connected with the Vermont University, at Burlington, Vermount. This chair he held for two years. He received from the Vermont University the honorary degree of A. M. in 1839. In 1841 he was appointed Lecturer on Materia Medica, Medical Botany and Medical Jurisprudence, in Dartmouth Medical College. In 1842 he was chosen Professor of Materia Medica and Therapeutics. In 1849 he was transferred to the chair of Theory and Practice of Medicine and Pathanatomy, then vacated by Prof. Joseph Roby. He retired from the work of teaching in the College and became Professor Emeritus of Theory and Practice of Medicine in 1871. After 1871 he occupied somewhat in constructing and filling the Museum of Pathological Anatomy, the money for which purpose was furnished by the gift his friend Edwin W. Stoughton, as an evidence of his appreciation of the doctor's services to himself, and of his professional eminence, and that he might aid others to attempt to reach like eminence.

== Military service ==
On the breaking out of the American Civil War, his services were early sought by his native State, in securing proper persons to act as medical officers for the volunteer regiments sent out by the State. He was a member of the State Board of Examiners of Surgeons during the war.

In the fall of 1861 he went to Washington, and presented himself for examination and appointment as Surgeon in the United States Army. He received an appointment, and served on the staff of the Commander of the First Brigade of Vermont Volunteers during the winter of 1861-1862, and nearly or quite through the Peninsular Campaign in the spring and summer of 1862.

Impaired health compelled his return to Vermont, where he was appointed to the medical charge (Brigadier Surgeon) of the Camp and the Military Hospital at Brattleboro. This hospital was built up under his own most careful and persistent attention, and it became one of the most perfectly arranged economically conducted hospitals in the country.

The large percent of recoveries in it, due to the skill with which he administered it, combined with its healthful situation, gave it and him great and well deserved credit. Near the close o the war he was transferred to a hospital in Kentucky, from which he returned to his home and his practice in Windsor, when his country no longer needed his services.

== Character ==
In his prime, Dr. Phelps was a man of physical and mental vigor. During his lectures at Hanover he would often ride from Windsor to Hanover in the morning, deliver his lecture, and return by a wide circuit for consultation, and attend to a large practice at home before retiring at night, and he would continue thus for weeks. He was a keen observer and a careful reasoner.

He was esteemed in his professional work, by his patrons, for his skill and scientific attainment rather than for his use of the manners and arts which are calculated to please the fancy and prejudice. For these things he cared less than nothing. His professional and scientific study was most untiring and long continued.

== Accomplishments ==
He accomplished a great deal in the way of work with the microscope – an amount which many not half as much occupied by professional work would think it impossible to do. He occupied many hours of the last days of his life, when confined to his room and his bed, in perfecting his microscopic preparations.

He read works in the German language before the demand for German works, as to call for their translation and publication in English, and quoted them acceptable in his lectures that he was named by the students "Old Rokitansky." (Baron Carl von Rokitansky). He was for many years esteemed as the most thoroughly learned man in his profession, in this portion of New England.

== Last years ==
Edward Elisha Phelps, M.D. LL.D., died at his residence in Windsor, Vermont, on Friday, November 26, 1880. He left little behind in terms of writing, save for a few papers on the subject of Temperance prepared for the Vermont Journal.

== Sources ==
- William Biddle Atkinson, The Physicians and Surgeons of the United States
- "Phelps, Edward Elisha". Vermont in the Civil War. Archived from the original on May 7, 2016.
- "Phelps, Edward Elisha, 1803-1880". Dartmouth Library Archives & Manuscripts.

This article incorporates text from The Vermont Journal, a publication from 1880, now in the public domain in the United States.
