= Frederick Ellsworth Mather =

American politician

Frederick Ellsworth Mather (May 23, 1809 – November 9, 1900) was an American military officer, lawyer and philanthropist

== Early life ==
The son of Ellsworth and Laura (Wolcott) Mather, he was born in Windsor, Connecticut. He was a lineal descendant of the nonconformist, Rev. Richard Mather, who came from England to Boston, Massachusetts, in 1635, and on his father's side he was the grandson of the sister of Chief Justice Oliver Ellsworth.

His father died when he was five years of age, and he was reared as a farmer's boy by his grandfather, Colonel Oliver Mather. At the age of eleven years he rescued a man and boy from drowning in a freshet.

== Education ==
After the death of his grandfather in 1829, he spent a few months in the office of Judge Miller, of Ellington, Connecticut, but desiring a college training he soon commenced a preparatory course, and was admitted to Yale in the second term of Sophomore year. He was a founding member of the Skull and Bones Society.

== Career ==
After graduation he resumed the study of law in the office of Judge Parsons and of Governor William W. Ellsworth of Hartford, Connecticut, and then entered the Yale Law School. Toward the close of 1835 he became law clerk in a New York office, and after his admission as Counselor at Law in 1838 he immediately began practice by himself. After thirty-five years of successful practice he partially withdrew from business in 1872.

In 1837 he entered the 264th Regiment, 64th Brigade, New York State Infantry, of which he was commissioned successively First Lieutenant, Captain, Lieutenant Colonel, and in 1842 General.

In 1845 he was a Democratic member of the New York State Assembly, from 1854 to 1857 a member of the Common Council of New York City, and for a number of years inspector and later trustee of the public schools.

For many years he devoted much attention to the conduct of public charities, and was an officer of the Prison Association, the Association for Improving the Condition of the Poor, the Sanitary Association, the Rose Beneficent Association, and others. But he was most deeply interested in medical charities. From 1851 to the close of 1889 he was President of the Demilt Dispensary, of which he was the originator. The results of a tour of inspection of hospitals and dispensaries abroad were embodied in the 25th Annual Report of this institution. He was one of the founders of the Roosevelt Hospital, and served many years as a trustee. He aided in starting the Northeastern and Northwestern Dispensaries.

== Later life ==
He was a member of the American Geographical Society, of the Wisconsin Historical Society, and an officer of several important business enterprises.

He was one of the originators of the New York Yale Alumni Association, and assisted in the organization of the Yale Law School Alumni Association, and of the Association of the Bar of the City of New York.

In 1882 he retired from his law practice entirely, and made a long visit abroad.

== Family ==
He married, in Hartford, Conn., on May 3, 1837, Ellen Pomeroy Goodrich, who died in 1871, by whom he had two sons and six daughters. He afterward married Charlotte Foster of Cumberland County, England, who died in 1884.

== Death ==
General Mather died of paralysis at his home in New York City, in his 92nd year. He had been unable to leave his house for six years, but had retained full possession of his faculties and a keen interest in current events until the last week.
