= Russell Cheney =

American painter

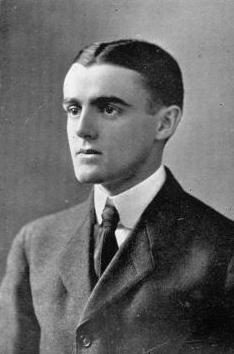
- Cheney in 1904
- Born: October 16, 1881; Manchester, Connecticut, US
- Died: July 12, 1945 (aged 63); Kittery, Maine, US
- Resting place: East Cemetery, Manchester, Connecticut, US
- Education: Yale University; Académie Julian; Art Students League of New York
- Known for: Painting

Russell Cheney (October 16, 1881 – July 12, 1945) was an American Impressionist, Post-Impressionist and New England regionalist painter.

== Early life and education ==
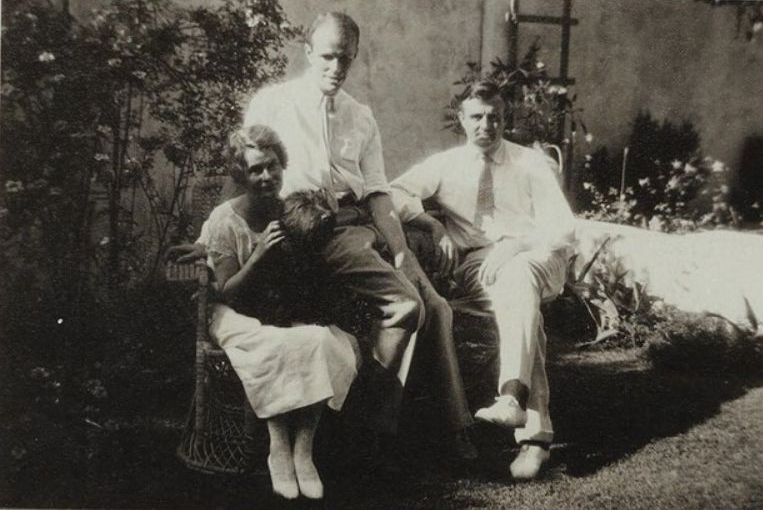
Helen Bayne Knapp, F. O. Matthiessen and Cheney at his garden, 1925

The youngest of eleven children, Cheney was born in Manchester, Connecticut, to Knight Dexter Cheney and Ednah Dow Cheney. He graduated from Yale University in 1904, where he was a member of the Skull and Bones secret society. Cheney studied at the Art Students League with Kenyon Cox and George Bridgman until 1907. He continued his art education in Paris under Jean Paul Laurens at the Académie Julian. After his father's death in 1908, he returned to America and continued with Cox and William Merritt Chase at the Art Students League. In 1909, Cheney was elected president of the League (the same year he exhibited at the Salon des Artistes Francais); he resigned a year later but continued to take classes there, studying with Chase as a private pupil. Cheney spent the summers between 1911 and 1914 painting in York and nearby Ogunquit, Maine. In 1912, he studied there with Charles Woodbury.

== Career ==
In 1909, Cheney exhibited his portrait of Professor Candle at the Salon des Artistes Francais. His first American exhibition was shown at the Fourth Annual Exhibition of the Connecticut Academy of Fine Arts in 1914. His first New York exhibition was in the Babcock Galleries in 1922, and a catalogue of his paintings was published the same year. His work was also exhibited at the Boston Museum of Fine Arts and the San Francisco Museum of Art

Cheney illustrated F. O. Matthiessen's book Sarah Orne Jewett (1929), a work on the life and work of writer of the same name.

Cheney was a member of the Connecticut Association of Fine Arts, Colorado Springs Art Society, and the San Francisco Art Society.

== Personal life ==
Cheney's health was poor and he spent two years in a Colorado tuberculosis sanatorium and subsequently spent winters in warm climes. He was the longtime partner and lover of author F. O. Matthiessen, who was also a Yale graduate and became a member of Skull & Bones in 1923. Russell was supported by his family and later when the family business was dissolved he was supported by Matthiessen. Matthiessen was twenty years Russell's junior. Russell's death was due to mesenteric thrombosis. He was buried in East Cemetery in Manchester, Connecticut. He was survived by Matthiessen and two sisters, Ednah Cheney Underhill of Santa Barbara, California, and Mrs. Halstead Dorey of Boerne, Texas.
