= F. O. Matthiessen =

American academic (1902–1950)

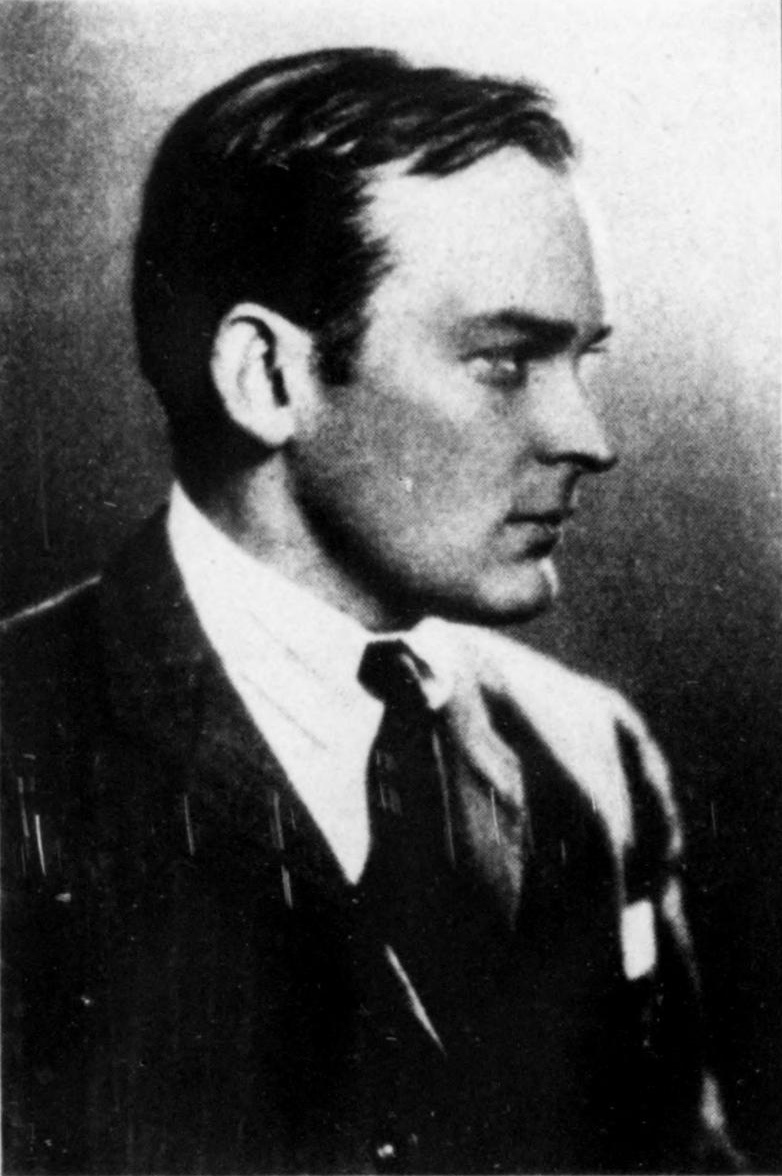
- Born: Francis Otto Matthiessen; February 19, 1902; Pasadena, California, US
- Died: April 1, 1950 (aged 48); Boston, Massachusetts, US
- Resting place: Springfield Cemetery, Springfield, Massachusetts
- Education: Yale, Oxford and Harvard
- Occupations: Historian, literary critic, educator
- Known for: American Renaissance
- Partner: Russell Cheney
- Awards: DeForest and Alpheus Henry Snow Prizes, Rhodes Scholarship

Francis Otto Matthiessen (February 19, 1902 – April 1, 1950) was an American educator, scholar, and literary critic, influential in the fields of American literature and American studies. His best known work, American Renaissance: Art and Expression in the Age of Emerson and Whitman, celebrated the achievements of several 19th-century American authors and had a profound impact on a generation of scholars. It also established American Renaissance as the common term to refer to American literature of the mid-19th century. Matthiessen was known for his support of liberal causes and progressive politics. His contributions to the Harvard University community have been memorialized in several ways, including an endowed visiting professorship.

== Early life and education ==
Francis Otto Matthiessen was born in Pasadena, California on February 19, 1902. He was the fourth of four children born to Frederick William Matthiessen (1868–1948) and Lucy Orne Pratt (1866). His grandfather, Frederick William Matthiessen, was an industrial leader in zinc production and a successful manufacturer of clocks and machine tools; and also served as mayor of LaSalle, Illinois for 10 years. Francis's three older siblings were Frederick William (born 1894), George Dwight (born 1897), and Lucy Orne (born 1898).

In Pasadena, Francis attended the Polytechnic School. After his parents separated, he relocated with his mother to his paternal grandparents' home in LaSalle. He completed his secondary education at Hackley School, in Tarrytown, New York.

In 1923, he graduated from Yale University, where he was managing editor of the Yale Daily News, editor of the Yale Literary Magazine, and a member of Skull and Bones. As the recipient of the university's DeForest Prize, he entitled his oration, "Servants of the Devil," in which he denounced Yale's administration as an "autocracy, ruled by a Corporation out of touch with college life and allied with big business." In his final year as a Yale undergraduate, he received the Alpheus Henry Snow Prize, awarded to the senior "who, through the combination of intellectual achievement, character, and personality, shall be adjudged by the faculty to have done the most for Yale by inspiring in classmates an admiration and love for the best traditions of high scholarship."

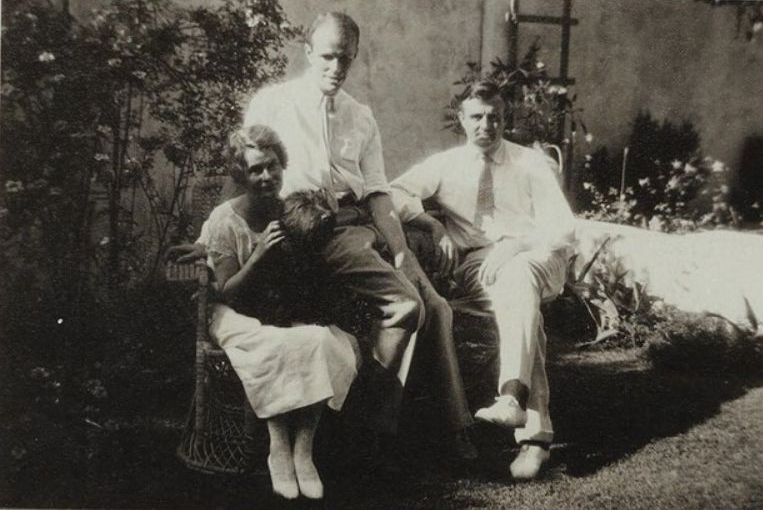
Helen Bayne Knapp, Matthiessen, and Russell Cheney: photo taken in Cheney's garden, 1925

As a Rhodes Scholar, he studied at Oxford University, earning a B.Litt. in 1925. Afterward, he quickly completed an M.A. in 1926 and Ph.D. in 1927 at Harvard University. He then taught at Yale for two years before beginning a distinguished teaching career at Harvard.

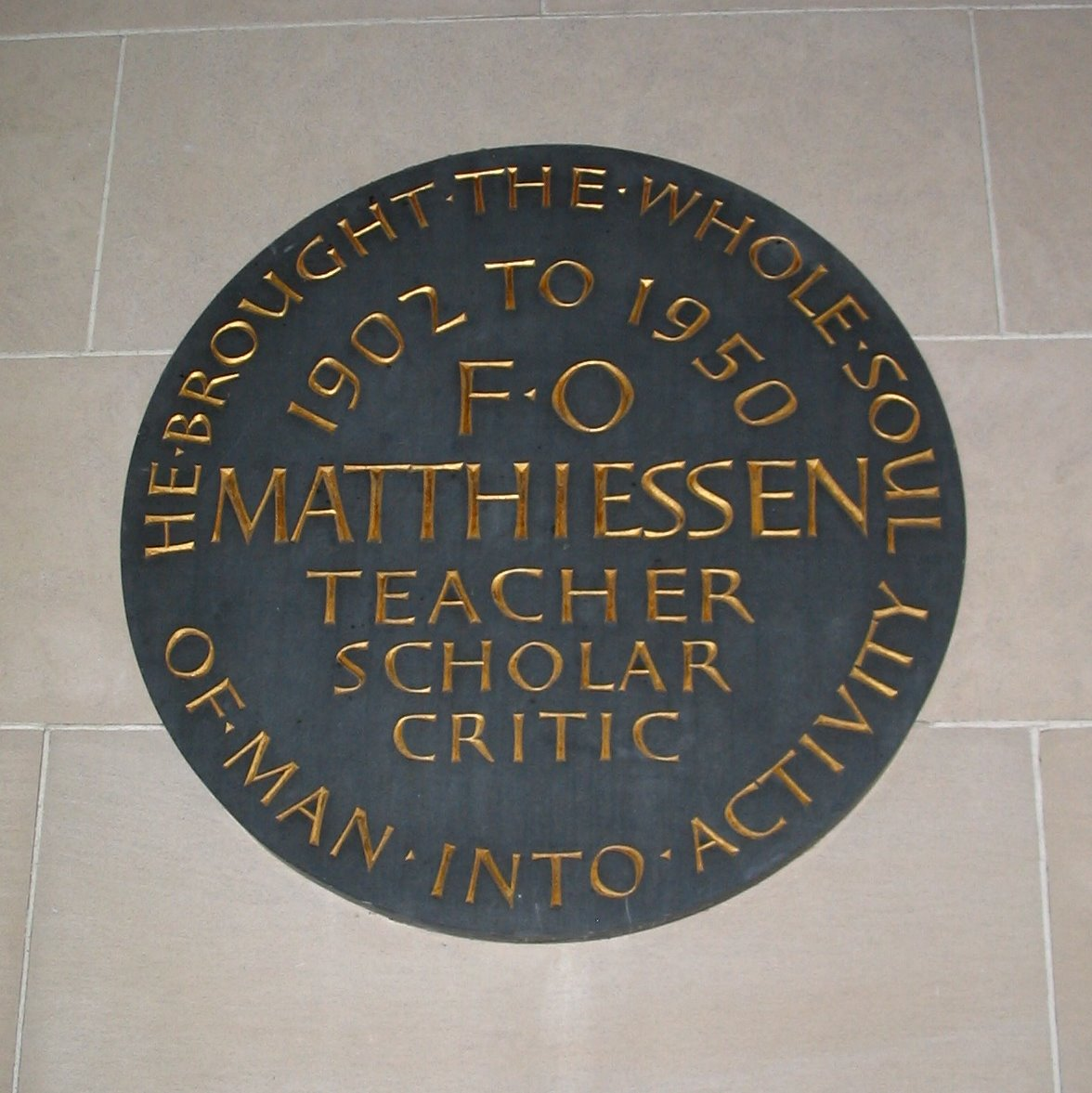
F. O. Matthiessen tablet at Eliot House, Harvard University, Cambridge, Massachusetts, US

== Scholarly work ==
Matthiessen was an American studies scholar and literary critic at Harvard University and chaired its undergraduate program in history and literature. He wrote and edited landmark works of scholarship on T. S. Eliot, Ralph Waldo Emerson, the James family (Alice James, Henry James, Henry James Sr., and William James), Sarah Orne Jewett, Sinclair Lewis, Herman Melville, Henry David Thoreau, and Walt Whitman. His best-known book, American Renaissance: Art and Expression in the Age of Emerson and Whitman (1941), discusses the flowering of literary culture in the middle of the American 19th century, with Emerson, Thoreau, Melville, Whitman and Nathaniel Hawthorne. Its focus was the period roughly from 1850 to 1855, in which all these writers, except Emerson, published what would, by Matthiessen's time, be considered their masterpieces: Melville's Moby-Dick, multiple editions of Whitman's Leaves of Grass, Hawthorne's The Scarlet Letter and The House of the Seven Gables, and Thoreau's Walden. The mid-19th century in American literature is commonly called the American Renaissance because of the influence of this work on later literary history and criticism. In 2003 the New York Times said that the book "virtually created the field of American literature." Originally Matthiessen planned to include Edgar Allan Poe in the book, but found that Poe did not fit in the scheme of the book. He wrote the chapter on Poe for the Literary History of the United States (LHUS, 1948), but "some of the editors missed the usual Matthiessen touch of brilliance and subtlety." Kermit Vanderbilt suggests that because Matthiessen was "not able to pull together the related strands" between Poe and the writers of American Renaissance, the chapter is "markedly old-fashioned." Matthiessen edited The Oxford Book of American Verse, published in 1950, an anthology of American poetry of major importance which contributed significantly to the propagation of American modernist poetry in the 1950s and 1960s.

Matthiessen was one of earliest scholars associated with the Salzburg Global Seminar. In July 1947, he gave the inaugural lecture, stating:

Our age has had no escape from an awareness of history. Much of that history has been hard and full of suffering. But now we have the luxury of an historical awareness of another sort, of an occasion not of anxiety but of promise. We may speak without exaggeration of this occasion as historic, since we have come here to enact anew the chief function of culture and humanism, to bring man again into communication with man.

Along with John Crowe Ransom and Lionel Trilling, in 1948, Matthiessen was one of the founders of the Kenyon School of English.

== Politics ==
Matthiessen's politics were left-wing and socialist. Already financially secure, he donated an inheritance he received in the late 1940s to his friend, Marxist economist Paul Sweezy. Sweezy used the money, totaling almost $15,000, to found a new journal, which became the Monthly Review. On the Harvard campus, Matthiessen was a visible and active supporter of progressive causes. In May 1940, he was elected president of the Harvard Teachers Union, an affiliate of the American Federation of Labor. The Harvard Crimson reported his inaugural address, in which Matthiessen quoted the campus union's constitution: "In affiliating with the organized labor movement, we express our desire to contribute to and receive support from this powerful progressive force; to reduce the segregation of teachers from the rest of the workers ...and increase thereby the sense of common purpose among them; and in particular to cooperate in this field in the advancement of education and resistance to all reaction."

Matthiessen seconded the nomination of the Progressive Party presidential candidate, Henry Wallace, at the party's convention in Philadelphia in 1948. Reflective of the emerging McCarthyism surveillance of left-wing university academics, he was mentioned as an activist in Boston area so-called "Communist front groups" by Herbert Philbrick.

== Personal life ==
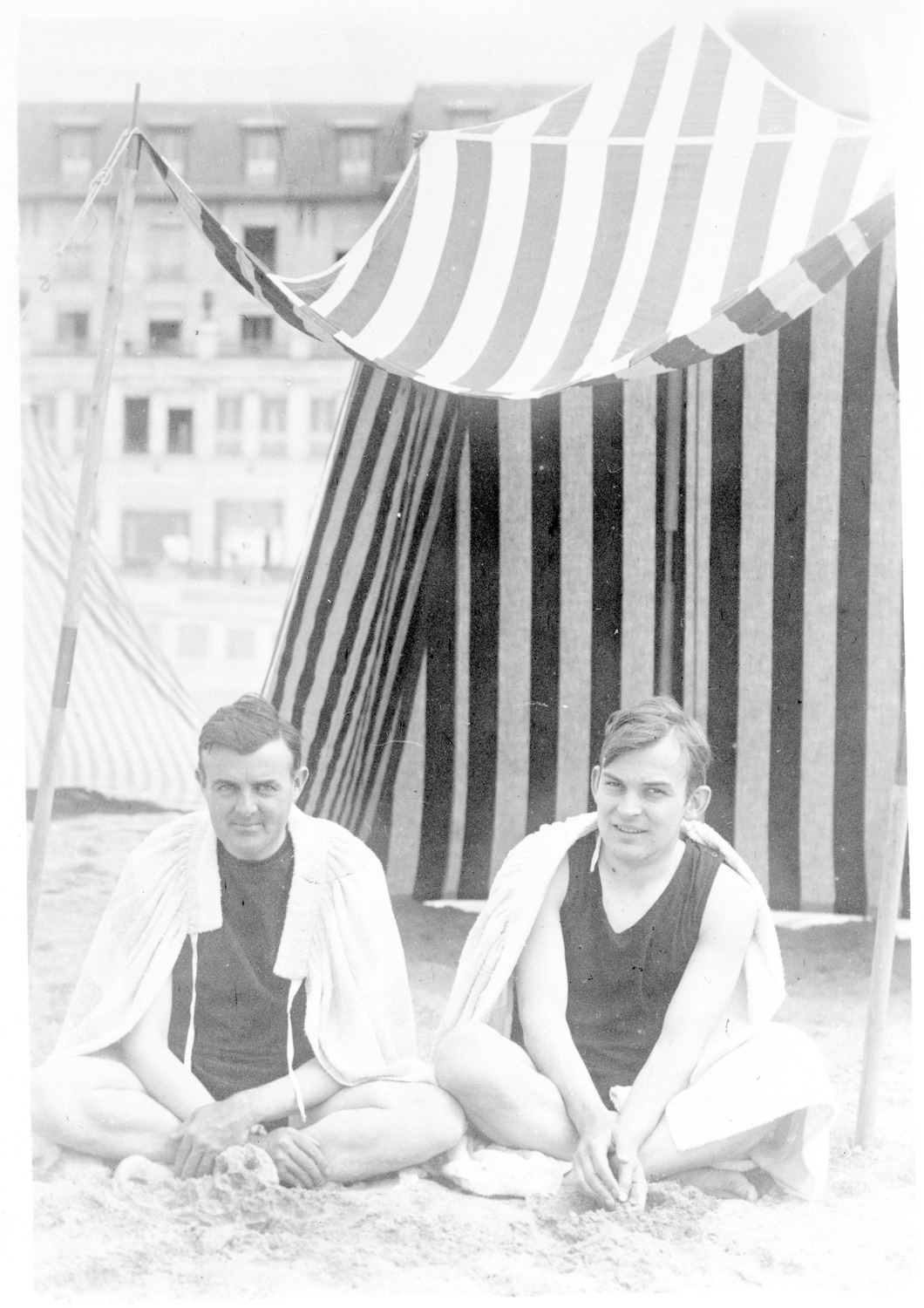
Matthiessen (right) with Russell Cheney, Normandy, summer 1925

Matthiessen was known to his friends as "Matty." As a gay man in the 1930s and 1940s, he chose to remain in the closet throughout his professional career, if not in his personal life, although traces of homoerotic concern are apparent in his writings. In 2009, a statement from Harvard University said that Matthiessen "stands out as an unusual example of a gay man who lived his sexuality as an 'open secret' in the mid-20th century."

He had a two-decade-long romantic relationship with the painter Russell Cheney, 20 years his senior. Like Matthiessen, the painter came from a family prominent in business, the Cheneys being among America's leading silk producers. In a 1925 letter to Cheney, Matthiessen wrote about trusting friends with the knowledge of their relationship, rather than the world at large; in planning to spend his life with Cheney, Matthiessen went as far as asking his cohort in the Yale secret society Skull and Bones to approve of their partnership. With Cheney having encouraged Matthiessen's interest in Whitman, it has been argued that American Renaissance was "the ultimate expression of Matthiessen's love for Cheney and a secret celebration of the gay artist." Throughout his teaching career at Harvard, Matthiessen maintained a residence in either Cambridge or Boston, but the couple often retreated to their shared cottage in Kittery, Maine. Russell Cheney died in July 1945.

A compilation of letters between Matthiessen and Cheney was published in 1978 under the title Rat & the Devil: journal letters of F. O. Matthiessen and Russell Cheney. The title alludes to the pseudonyms by which the two refer to one another: Matthiessen is "Devil" and Cheney is "Rat." In 1992 the collection was adapted as a stage play, titled Devil & Rat in Love, written and directed by Michael Bonacci. The play was also a tribute to Bonacci's partner, who had died the previous year.

== Death ==
Matthiessen committed suicide in 1950 by jumping from a 12th-floor window of the Hotel Manger in Boston. He had been hospitalized once for a nervous breakdown in 1938–39. He was also deeply affected by Russell Cheney's death from a heart attack, in 1945. Matthiessen spent the evening before his own death at the home of his friend and colleague, Kenneth Murdock (scholar), Harvard's Higginson Professor of English Literature.

In a note left in the hotel room, Matthiessen wrote, "I am depressed over world conditions. I am a Christian and a Socialist. I am against any order which interferes with that objective." Commentators have speculated on the impact of the escalating Red Scare on his state of mind. He was being targeted by anti-communist forces that would soon be exploited by Senator Joseph McCarthy, and inquiries by the House Un-American Activities Committee into his politics may have been a contributing factor in his suicide. In an article subsection titled "Dupes and Fellow Travelers Dress Up Communist Fronts" in the April 4, 1949 edition of Life magazine, he had been pictured among fifty prominent academics, scientists, clergy and writers, who also included Albert Einstein, Arthur Miller, Lillian Hellman, Langston Hughes, Norman Mailer and fellow Harvard professors Kirtley Mather, Corliss Lamont, and Ralph Barton Perry. In 1958, Eric Jacobsen wrote that Matthiessen's death had been "hastened by forces whose activities earned for themselves the sobriquet un-American., which they sought so assiduously to fasten on others." But, in 1978, Harry Levin was more skeptical, saying only that "spokesmen for the Communist Party, to which he had never belonged, loudly signalized his suicide as a political gesture."

Matthiessen was buried at Springfield Cemetery in Springfield, Massachusetts.

== Legacy ==
Matthiessen's contribution to the critical celebration of 19th-century American literature is considered formative and enduring. Along with several other scholars, he is regarded as a contributor to the creation of American studies as a recognized academic discipline. His personal story, academic contributions, political activism, and early death had a lasting impact on a circle of scholars and writers. Their sense of loss and struggle to understand his suicide can be found in two novels with central figures inspired by Matthiessen, May Sarton's Faithful are the Wounds (1955) and Mark Merlis's American Studies (1994).

His stature and legacy as a member of the Harvard community has been memorialized in several ways by the university. He was the first Senior Tutor at Eliot House, one of Harvard College's undergraduate residential houses. More than 70 years after his death, Matthiessen's suite at Eliot House remains preserved as the F. O. Matthiessen Room, housing personal manuscripts and 1,700 volumes of his library available for scholarly research by permission. Eliot House also hosts an annual Matthiessen Dinner with a guest speaker.

In 2009, Harvard established an endowed chair in LGBT studies called the F. O. Matthiessen Visiting Professorship of Gender and Sexuality. Harvard President Drew Faust called it "an important milestone" and "the first professorship of its kind in the country." It is funded by a $1.5 million gift from the members and supporters of the Harvard Gender and Sexuality Caucus.

Holders of the chair have included:

- 2013: Henry D. Abelove
- 2014: Gayle Rubin
- 2016: Robert Reid-Pharr
- 2018: Omise'eke Natasha Tinsley
- 2020: Mel Y. Chen
- 2023: C. Riley Snorton

== Principal publications ==
Based primarily on the Library of Congress catalog.

- Sarah Orne Jewett, Houghton Mifflin (1929)
- Translation: An Elizabethan Art, Harvard University Press (1931)
- The Achievement of T. S. Eliot: An Essay on the Nature of Poetry, Houghton Mifflin / Oxford University Press (1935)
- American Renaissance: Art and Expression in the Age of Emerson and Whitman, Oxford University Press (1941)
- Herman Melville: Selected Poems, edited, New Directions (1944)
- Henry James: The Major Phase, Oxford University Press (1944)
- The James Family: A Group Biography, Alfred A. Knopf (1947)
- Russell Cheney, 1881–1945: A Record of His Work, Oxford University Press (1947)
- The Notebooks of Henry James, edited with Kenneth B. Murdock, Oxford University Press (1947)
- From the Heart of Europe, Oxford University Press (1948)
- "To the Memory of Phelps Putnam", Kenyon Review (Winter 1949)

Posthumous

- "The Education of a Socialist", Monthly Review, Vol 2, No 6 (October 1950)
- "Of Crime and Punishment", Monthly Review, Vol 2, No 6 (October 1950)
- The Oxford Book of American Verse, edited, Oxford University Press (1950)
- Theodore Dreiser, William Sloane (1951)
- Responsibilities of the Critic, Oxford University Press (1952)
