= Edward Johnson Phelps =

Edward Johnson Phelps (18 April 1863, Andover, Massachusetts - 9 August 1938, New Monterey, California) family had been settled in Massachusetts from the earliest times and are alleged to be of noble descent. Edward's father, the Rev. Austin Phelps was a graduated of the University of Pennsylvania and studied for a year at the Yale Divinity School. Austin was professor of sacred rhetoric at the Andover Theological Seminary for over thirty years.

Edward Phelps attended Yale College, where he graduated in 1886. During that time he took an interest in sports, being a member of the Freshman Football Team and was also Chairman of the Yale Literary Magazine. He was a member of Eta Phi, Delta Kappa Epsilon, Chi Delta Theta, the Political Science Club and Skull and Bones. Due to his ability as a public speaker, Phelps was entered into the De Forest Medal Contest in his senior year. He was beaten by Evans Woollen, who like Phelps spoke on "The American Tory in the Revolution" After his senior year, Phelps enrolled at the Yale Graduate School and received an MA in 1888. During the years 1887 and 1888, he also engaged in the insurance business in Chicago.

With an MA to his name, Phelps entered the offices of the New Haven Morning News as a reporter and was later promoted to the position of telegraph editor. The following year, he was appointed reporter and chief editor of the Hartford Courant. Phelps was not to stay in Connecticut for long, for in 1890 he made his way to Chicago, where he engaged in editorial and financial work at the Chicago Herald. He left the Chicago Herald in 1895, to pursue a career, using the financial skills he had picked up. He was picked up by the Northern Trust Safe Deposit Company of Chicago, where he was secretary, treasurer and general manager until 1923. From 1923 to his retirement in 1929, he was a director and President of the company. Phelps became well known in safe deposit circles, being made President of the Illinois Safe Deposit Association and Chairman of the National Safe Deposit Advisory Council. From 1895 to 1897, Phelps was secretary of Chicago's First Civil Service Commission.

Phelps was heavily involved in the affairs of Yale throughout his life. He was secretary and treasurer of the Yale Scholarship Trust of Chicago, in 1905; President of the Yale Club of Chicago, from 1910 to 1911; represented the Yale Club of Chicago on the Alumni Board, from 1910 to 1916; and was a director of the Yale Publishing Association. He also took an interest in a high school in Winnetka, Illinois.
