= University of California College of the Law, San Francisco people =

This page lists notable alumni, students, and faculty of the University of California College of the Law, San Francisco, a public law school in San Francisco, California.

== Alumni ==
Notable alumni include:

- Dick Ackerman (1967) – California State Senate Republican Leader
- Jeff Adachi (1985) – Public Defender of San Francisco
- Jeffrey Amestoy (1972) – 40th Chief Justice of the Vermont Supreme Court
- Cynthia Bashant (1986) – judge of the United States District Court for the Southern District of California
- Marvin Baxter (1966) – Associate Justice of the California Supreme Court
- Joseph T. Bockrath – Professor of Law at LSU Law Center
- Lloyd Braun (1983) – former media executive with Yahoo!, former chairman of the American Broadcasting Company Entertainment group
- Willie Brown (1958) – 58th Speaker of the California State Assembly and 41st mayor of San Francisco
- Melvin Brunetti (1964) – Senior Circuit Judge of the U.S. Court of Appeals for the Ninth Circuit
- Richard Bryan (1963) – former U.S. Senator and 25th Governor of Nevada
- Peter Buxtun (1971) – epidemiologist and whistleblower responsible for ending the Tuskegee Syphilis Study
- Oliver Jesse Carter (1935) – judge of the United States District Court for the Northern District of California
- Ed Case (1981) – U.S. congressman from Hawaii's 2nd Congressional District
- Suzanne Case (1983) – chairperson, Hawai'i Department of Land and Natural Resources, former Executive Director of The Nature Conservancy in Hawai'i
- Stephen H. Cassidy (1989) – mayor of San Leandro, California
- Rachelle Chong (1984) – first Asian American Federal Communications Commission Commissioner (President Clinton appointee), first Asian American Commissioner of the California Public Utilities Commission (Governor Schwarzenegger appointee), former General Counsel for Broadband Office and Sidecar
- James M. Cole (1979) – 35th United States Deputy Attorney General
- Carol Corrigan (1975) – Associate Justice of the California Supreme Court
- Robert Everett Coyle (1956) – judge of the United States District Court for the Eastern District of California
- Charles F. Creighton – Attorney General of the Hawaiian Kingdom
- Bill Dannemeyer (1952) – U.S. Congressman from California's 39th Congressional District (Orange County)
- Christopher Darden (1980) – prosecutor in O. J. Simpson murder case
- Edward Davila (1979) – judge of the United States District Court for the Northern District of California
- Mabel Craft Deering
- Sanford Diller (1927) – real estate developer
- Sean Elsbernd (2000) – member, San Francisco Board of Supervisors, 2004–2013
- Clair Engle (1933) – U.S. senator from California
- Sean Faircloth (1986) – Maine House Majority Whip, executive director of Secular Coalition for America
- Edward Silsby Farrington – judge of the United States District Court for the District of Nevada
- Katherine Feinstein (1984) – former judge of San Francisco County Superior Court and President of the San Francisco Fire Commission
- Clara Shortridge Foltz (1881) – first practicing female lawyer in the United States
- Earl Ben Gilliam (1957) – judge of the United States District Court for the Southern District of California
- Abby Ginzberg (1975) – documentary filmmaker
- Louis Earl Goodman (1915) – judge of the United States District Court for the Northern District of California
- Philip Kan Gotanda (1978) – playwright
- Karla Gray (1976) – 14th Chief Justice of the Montana Supreme Court
- Amanda Grove (1990) – former Court TV anchor
- Ancer L. Haggerty (1973) – judge of the United States District Court for the District of Oregon
- Terence Hallinan (1964) – 26th San Francisco District Attorney
- Kamala Harris (1990) – 49th vice president of the United States
- Robert Hertzberg (1979) – 64th Speaker of the California State Assembly and California state senator
- Dennis Holahan (1973) – actor and entertainment lawyer, partner of Lewis Brisbois Bisgaard & Smith
- William Robert Holcomb (1950) – longest-serving mayor of San Bernardino, California
- Michael Huttner (1995) – progressive activist and founder of ProgressNow
- Vicki Iovine (1980) – Playboy Playmate, author
- Gregg Jarrett (1980) – anchor, Fox News Channel
- Sherwood "Shakey" Johnson – founder of Shakey's Pizza
- Michael John Kennedy – criminal defense and civil rights lawyer and activist
- Robert Krimmer – former actor, now attorney
- Christine la Barraque – first blind woman admitted to the bar in California
- Howard Lachtman – literary critic, Los Angeles Times, San Francisco Examiner
- Otto Lee (1994) – mayor of Sunnyvale, California
- Ronald B. Leighton (1976) – judge of the United States District Court for the Western District of Washington
- Emma Ping Lum (1947) – first Chinese American female lawyer to practice in the United States
- Eugene F. Lynch (1958) – judge of the United States District Court for the Northern District of California
- Frank D.G. Madison (1892) – name partner of Pillsbury Madison and Sutro, now Pillsbury Winthrop Shaw Pittman LLP
- Wiley Manuel (1953) – Associate Justice of the California Supreme Court and first African American California Supreme Court Justice
- Lia Matera (1981) – mystery writer
- Robert Matsui (1966) – U.S. congressman from California's 5th Congressional District (Sacramento)
- Frank McGlynn Sr. (1894) – stage and film actor
- Rodney Melville – California judge, notable for presiding over the People v. Jackson case
- Thomas Mesereau (1979) – criminal defense attorney with celebrity client list, including Michael Jackson and Robert Blake
- Linda G. Mills (1983) – 17th president of New York University
- Alexander Morrison (1881) – founder of Morrison & Foerster
- George Moscone (1957) – mayor of San Francisco, assassinated in 1978
- Ray Mueller (2001) – District 3 Supervisor, San Mateo County Board of Supervisors – mayor, councilmember of Menlo Park, CA
- Paula A. Nakayama (1979) – Associate Justice of the Hawaii Supreme Court
- Troy L. Nunley (1990) – judge of the United States District Court for the Eastern District of California
- Lawrence Joseph O'Neill (1979) – judge of the United States District Court for the Eastern District of California
- Andrew Downey Orrick (1947) – former acting chairman of the U.S. Securities and Exchange Commission and son of William Horsley Orrick, Sr. of Orrick, Herrington & Sutcliffe
- Charles (Chip) Pashayan (1968) – U.S. congressman from 1979 to 1991 for California's 17th Congressional District
- Christine Pelosi (1993) – Democratic Party political strategist from California
- Richard W. Pollack – Associate Justice of the Hawaii Supreme Court
- Mario R. Ramil (1975) – Associate Justice of the Hawaii Supreme Court
- Ann Ravel (1974) – professor at the University of California, Berkeley School of Law and former Chair of the Federal Election Commission
- John Skylstead Rhoades Sr. (1951) – judge of the United States District Court for the Southern District of California
- Robert Rigsby (1986) – Associate Justice of the D.C. Superior Court, former Attorney General for the District of Columbia, former Assistant U.S. Attorney for the Eastern District of Virginia, U.S. Army colonel, Bronze Star recipient, former JAG and military judge
- George R. Roberts (1969) – co-founder of Kohlberg Kravis & Roberts Company
- Veronica S. Rossman (1997) – judge of the United States Court of Appeals for the Tenth Circuit
- Louis Sachar (1980) – young-adult mystery-comedy author
- Rob Saka – member, Seattle City Council
- James David Santini (1962) – U.S. Congressman from Nevada
- Robert Howard Schnacke (1938) – judge of the United States District Court for the Northern District of California
- Kevin Shelley (1980) – 28th California Secretary of State
- Douglas W. Shorenstein – real estate developer and former chairman of the board of directors of the Federal Reserve Bank of San Francisco
- James Francis Smith – Associate Justice of the Supreme Court of the Philippines; Governor-General of the Philippines
- Guillermo Söhnlein (1995) – co-founder of OceanGate
- Jackie Speier (1976) – U.S. Congresswoman
- Todd Spitzer (1989) – California State Assemblyman, Orange County District Attorney
- J. Christopher Stevens (1989) – former U.S. Ambassador to Libya
- Alfred Sutro (1894) – name partner of Pillsbury Madison and Sutro, now Pillsbury Winthrop Shaw Pittman LLP
- Nancy Tellem (1979) – entertainment and digital media president of Microsoft and former CBS entertainment president
- Richard Thalheimer (1974) – founder and CEO of The Sharper Image
- Anne Traum (1996) – judge of the United States District Court for the District of Nevada
- Tom Umberg (1980) – California state senator
- Ann Veneman (1976) – 27th U.S. Secretary of Agriculture, Executive Director of UNICEF
- Philip Charles Wilkins (1939) – judge of the United States District Court for the Eastern District of California

== Faculty ==
Current

- Marsha Berzon
- Veena Dubal
- Robin Feldman
- Joseph Grodin
- Ugo Mattei
- Roger Park
- Naomi Roht-Arriaza

Former

- John Harmon Charles Bonté
- Miguel de Capriles
- Geoffrey Hazard
- Jaime King
- Eumi K. Lee
- Naomi Roht-Arriaza
- Calvin R. Massey

Sixty-Five Club

Some of the members of the UC Hastings Sixty-Five Club include:

- Arthur Goldberg – former U.S. Supreme Court Justice
- William Prosser – torts
- Rudolf Schlesinger – international & comparative law
- Julius Stone – jurisprudence & international law
- Roger Traynor – former California Supreme Court Justice
