= William B. Shubb =

American judge (born 1938)

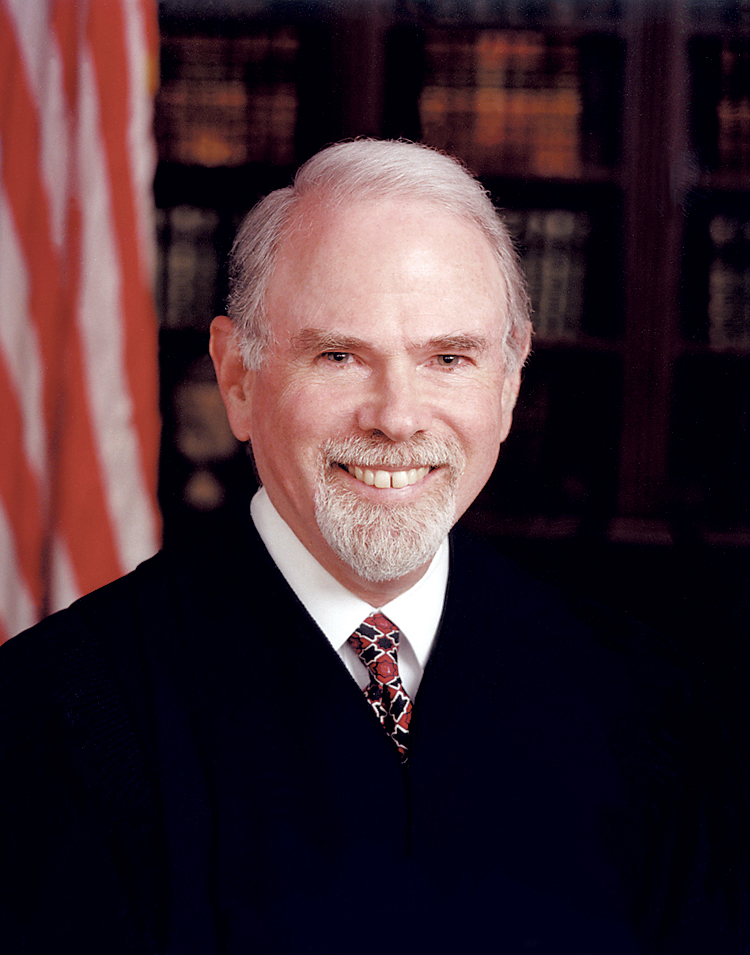

Senior Judge of the United States District Court for the Eastern District of California
- Incumbent
- Assumed office November 1, 2004

Chief Judge of the United States District Court for the Eastern District of California
- In office 1996–2003
- Preceded by: Robert Everett Coyle
- Succeeded by: David F. Levi

Judge of the United States District Court for the Eastern District of California
- In office October 1, 1990 – November 1, 2004
- Appointed by: George H. W. Bush
- Preceded by: Raul Anthony Ramirez
- Succeeded by: Seat abolished

Personal details
- Born: May 28, 1938 (age 87) Oakland, California, U.S.
- Education: University of California, Berkeley (AB, JD)

William B. Shubb (born May 28, 1938) is a senior United States district judge of the United States District Court for the Eastern District of California.

== Early life and education ==
Shubb was born in Oakland, California. He received a Bachelor of Arts degree from the University of California, Berkeley in 1960 and a Juris Doctor from the University of California, Berkeley, Boalt Hall School of Law in 1963.

== Career ==
Shubb was a law clerk for Judge Sherrill Halbert of the United States District Court for the Eastern District of California from 1963 to 1965. He served as an assistant United States attorney of the Eastern District of California from 1965 to 1971. He was the chief assistant United States attorney of Eastern District of California from 1971 to 1974. From 1974 to 1980 and 1981 to 1990, he was in private practice in Sacramento, California. Shubb was the United States attorney for the Eastern District of California from 1980 to 1981.

=== Federal judicial service ===
On August 3, 1990, Shubb was nominated by President George H. W. Bush to a seat on the United States District Court for the Eastern District of California vacated by Judge Raul Anthony Ramirez. Shubb was confirmed by the United States Senate on September 28, 1990, and received his commission on October 1, 1990. He served as Chief Judge from 1996 to 2003, assuming senior status on November 1, 2004.

== Sources ==
Legal offices
Preceded by Raul Anthony Ramirez	Judge of the United States District Court for the Eastern District of California; 1990–2004	Succeeded by Seat abolished
Preceded by Robert Everett Coyle	Chief Judge of the United States District Court for the Eastern District of California; 1996–2003	Succeeded by David F. Levi
