= United States v. Schweder et al. =

Federal criminal case in the Eastern District of California

United States v. Schweder et al. was a federal criminal case in the Eastern District of California (Case No. 2:11-CR-00449-KJM). It is notable for being the first case in decades in which a federal judge examined the constitutionality of marijuana’s classification as a Schedule I controlled substance.

== Case details ==
The case began with the discovery of a large cannabis cultivation site in Trinity County, California. On October 3, 2011, law enforcement officers arrested Brian Schweder at a rural property linked to the operation. Three days later, on October 6, the U.S. Attorney filed criminal charges, which developed into a conspiracy case involving 16 defendants.

The defendants in the case included Bryan R. Schweder, who was identified as the lead defendant, along with Brian Pickard, Juan Madrigal Olivera, and Manuel Madrigal Olivera. Others named were Fred W. Holmes III, Efren Rodriguez, Paul Cruce Rockwell, Homero Lopez-Barron, Victorino Betancourt-Meraz, Oseas Cardenas-Tolentino, Fernando Reyes-Mojica, Juan Cisneros-Vargas, Leonardo Tapia, Filiberto Espinoza-Tapia, and Osiel Valencia-Alvarez.

The defendants faced several federal charges, including conspiracy to manufacture at least 100 marijuana plants under 21 U.S.C. §§ 846 and 841(a)(1), as well as conspiracy to manufacture at least 1,000 marijuana plants. They were also charged with being felons in possession of a firearm under 18 U.S.C. § 922(g)(1), along with additional drug trafficking and conspiracy offenses.

Authorities reported that the operation included more than 1,000 plants in the Shasta-Trinity National Forest, along with plants at Pickard and Schweder’s properties. Of the 16 people originally charged, seven reached settlements early in the case, leaving nine to stand trial.

== Constitutional challenge ==
The case was notable for a constitutional challenge brought by defense attorneys Zenia Gilg and Heather Burke of the NORML Legal Committee. They sought dismissal of the indictment, arguing that marijuana’s Schedule I classification violated their clients’ rights under the Fifth and Tenth Amendments.

The defense presented several constitutional theories:

Equal protection challenge: The defense argued that the Controlled Substances Act violated equal protection, claiming it was enacted with discriminatory intent and had a disparate impact on Hispanic defendants. They presented statistics showing that between 2009 and 2013, 57.2% to 65.5% of federal marijuana convictions involved Hispanic defendants, who made up about 16–17% of the U.S. population.

Equal sovereignty challenge: The defense also argued that uneven enforcement of federal marijuana laws among states violated the principle of equal sovereignty.

Fundamental rights challenge: The defense maintained that the statute infringed on fundamental liberty rights and should be subject to strict scrutiny.

== Evidentiary hearing ==
In October 2014, Judge Kimberly J. Mueller of the U.S. District Court held an evidentiary hearing on the classification of marijuana as a Schedule I substance under the Controlled Substances Act. It was the first time in several decades that a federal district court judge considered reviewing marijuana’s scheduling.

The five-day hearing featured testimony from multiple experts: Dr. Philip A. Denney (former president of the Society of Cannabis Clinicians), Dr. Greg Carter (specialist in neurodegenerative diseases), Dr. Carl Hart (Columbia University neuroscientist), Dr. James Nolan (sociology professor with law enforcement background), Jennie Stormes (nurse whose son had Dravet syndrome), and Sgt. Ryan Begin (Iraq combat veteran with PTSD).

== Ruling ==
On April 17, 2015, Judge Mueller issued a written decision denying the motion to dismiss. In a brief hearing, she noted that the Controlled Substances Act had been in place for 45 years and that circumstances had changed since its passage. She ruled that marijuana’s Schedule I classification met the requirements of the rational basis test, and stated that any change to the statute was the responsibility of Congress rather than the courts. She further explained that it was not the role of the judiciary to overturn federal law or to make public policy.
