= Judge Ramirez =

Judge Ramirez may refer to:

- Irma Carrillo Ramirez (born 1964), magistrate judge of the United States District Court for the Northern District of Texas
- Raul Anthony Ramirez (born 1944), judge of the United States District Court for the Eastern District of California
- Sergio García Ramírez (born 1938), Mexican jurist and judge of the Inter-American Court of Human Rights
