= Judge O'Neill =

Judge O'Neill may refer to:

- Lawrence Joseph O'Neill (born 1952), judge of the United States District Court for the Eastern District of California
- Thomas Newman O'Neill Jr. (1928–2018), judge of the United States District Court for the Eastern District of Pennsylvania
