= Boston College Law Review =

- Discipline: Legal studies
- Language: English
- Edited by: Haley Cole & Sara Womble (EICs)

Publication details
- Former name(s): Boston College Industrial & Commercial Law Review
- History: 1959–present
- Publisher: Boston College Law School (United States)
- Frequency: 8/year (plus an on-line only supplement)

Standard abbreviations
- Bluebook: B.C. L. Rev.
- ISO 4: Boston Coll. Law Rev.

Indexing
- ISSN: 0161-6587
- LCCN: 78643575
- OCLC no.: 806486089

Links
- Journal homepage

The Boston College Law Review is an academic journal of legal scholarship and a student organization at Boston College Law School. It was established in 1959. Until 1977, it was known as the Boston College Industrial & Commercial Law Review. Among student-edited general-interest law reviews, it is currently ranked 21st in the Washington and Lee School of Law Law Journal Rankings.

The journal publishes eight issues each year (plus an online-only issue, known as the E. Supp., that provides commentary on recent en banc and other significant federal circuit court decisions). Each print issue typically includes four or five articles concerning legal issues of national interest written by outside authors, as well as several student-written notes. The journal has published articles on such wide-ranging topics as the legal issues involved in managing the lives of ex-offenders, the compensation of fund managers in the mutual fund industry, and the contributions of interdisciplinary evidence scholarship. The journal also hosts symposia from time to time and publishes the resulting scholarship.

The journal is staffed by approximately 50 second- and 50 third-year law students. Staff positions are filled by students who either attain the top five grades in each first-year section, who score highest in the first-year writing competition, or a combination of these two criteria. All second-year law students serve as staff writers while third-years serve as editors.

The editorial staff of third-years is made up of a nineteen-member Executive Board, with the remainder of editors serving as either Senior Editors or Articles Editors. Senior Editors are responsible for training staff writers on the BCLR style. Articles Editors undertake substantive edits of articles submitted by outside authors for publication under the direction of the Executive Board.

The Executive Board is made up of two Editors-in-Chief, five Managing Editors, four Executive Articles Editors, four Executive Notes Editors, and four Executive Comments Editors. The Editors-in-Chief oversee the publication of the entire journal. The Managing Editors are responsible for the technical accuracy of all content that goes to publication. The Executive Articles Editors, Executive Notes Editors, and Executive Comments Editors are responsible for the selection and editing of the articles, notes, and comments respectively.

== Notable articles ==
- Snyder, Brad, & Barrett, John Q. (2012). "Rehnquist's Missing Letter: A Former Law Clerk's 1955 Thoughts on Justice Jackson and Brown" (PDF). Boston College Law Review. 53: 631. Archived from the original (PDF) on October 16, 2015.
- Amar, Vikram David (2011). "The NCAA as Regulator, Litigant, and State Actor". Boston College Law Review. 52: 415.
- Spencer, A. Benjamin (2008). "Plausibility Pleading". Boston College Law Review. 49: 431.
- Minow, Martha (2007). "Should Religious Groups Be Exempt from Civil Rights Laws?". Boston College Law Review. 48: 781.
- Park, Roger C.; Saks, Michael J. (2006). "Evidence Scholarship Reconsidered: Results of the Interdisciplinary Turn" (PDF). Boston College Law Review. 47: 949.
