= Damrell =

Damrell is a surname. Notable people with the surname include:

- Frank C. Damrell Jr. (born 1938), United States federal judge in the Eastern District of California
- John S. Damrell, president of the International Association of Fire Chiefs
- William S. Damrell, member of the United States House of Representatives from Massachusetts
