= Calvin Massey =

Calvin Massey may refer to:

- Cal Massey (1928–1972), American jazz trumpeter and composer
- Calvin R. Massey (1951–2015), American legal scholar
