= Dale A. Drozd =

American judge (born 1955)

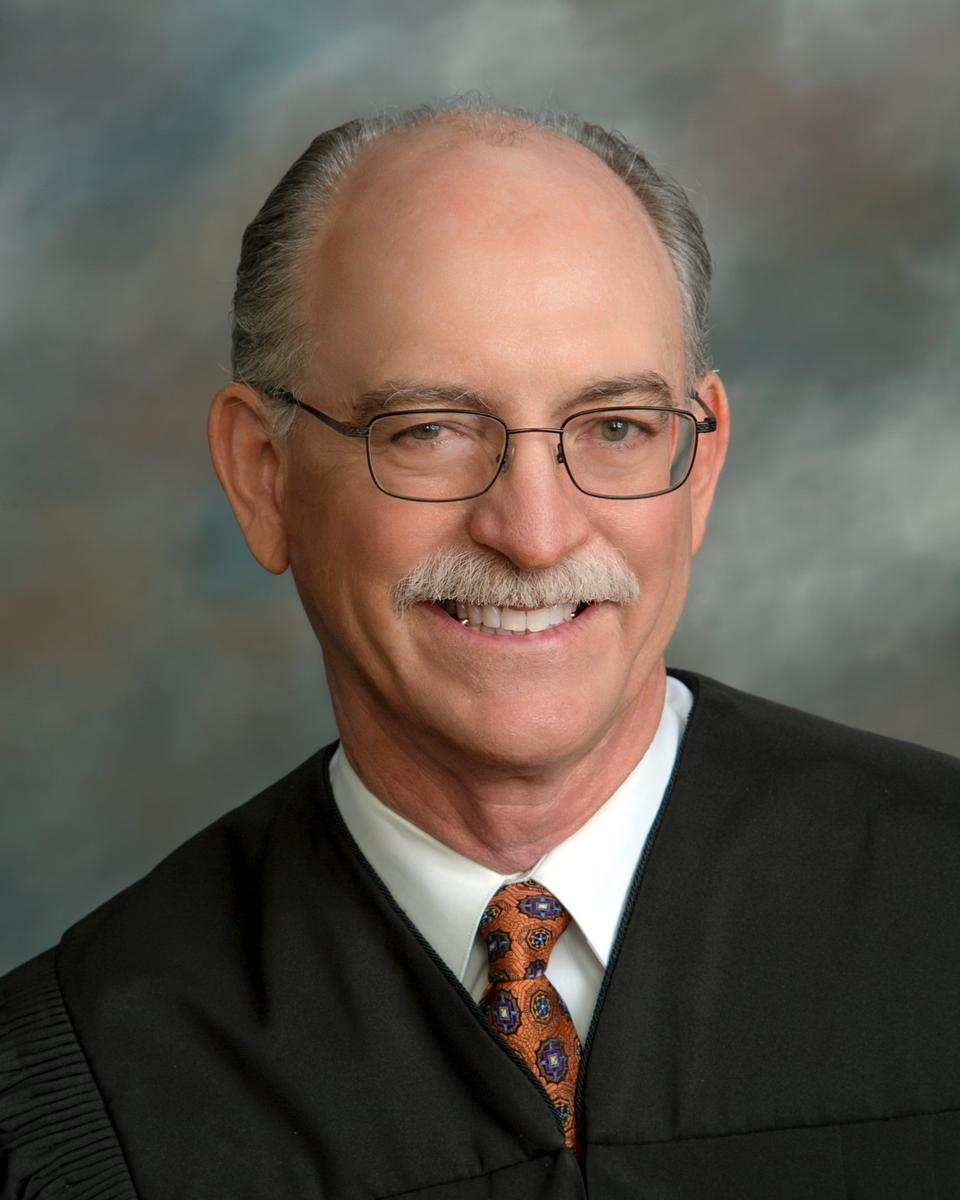

Judge of the United States District Court for the Eastern District of California
- Incumbent
- Assumed office November 2, 2015
- Appointed by: Barack Obama
- Preceded by: Anthony W. Ishii

Chief Magistrate Judge of the United States District Court for the Eastern District of California
- In office January 1, 2011 – November 1, 2015

Magistrate Judge of the United States District Court for the Eastern District of California
- In office July 15, 1997 – November 1, 2015

Personal details
- Born: Dale Alan Drozd; 1955 (age 70–71) Los Angeles County, California, U.S.
- Education: San Diego State University (BA); University of California, Los Angeles (JD)

Dale Alan Drozd (born 1955) is a United States district judge of the United States District Court for the Eastern District of California and former Chief United States magistrate judge of the same court.

== Early life and education ==
Drozd was born in 1955, in Los Angeles County, California. He is a 1973 graduate of Servite High School, in Anaheim. He attended the University of Southern California from 1973 to 1975, graduated from San Diego State University with a Bachelor of Arts degree in 1977, and he received a Juris Doctor in 1980 from the University of California, Los Angeles, School of Law.

== Career ==
After graduation Drozd served as a law clerk to Judge Lawrence K. Karlton of the United States District Judge Eastern District of California from 1980 to 1982 and was in private practice of law for 15 years in San Francisco and Sacramento.

=== Federal judicial service ===
The judges of the United States District Court of the Eastern District of California appointed Drozd to be a United States magistrate judge in 1997 and he was appointed as chief United States magistrate judge of the same court in 2010. He served as chief judge from January 1, 2011, until his appointment as district judge.

On November 12, 2014, President Barack Obama nominated Drozd to serve as a judge on the United States District Court for the Eastern District of California, to the seat vacated by Anthony W. Ishii, who assumed senior status on October 31, 2012. On December 16, 2014, his nomination was returned to the president due to the sine die adjournment of the 113th Congress.

On January 7, 2015, President Obama renominated him to the same position. He received a hearing before the United States Senate Judiciary Committee on May 6, 2015. On June 4, 2015, his nomination was reported out of committee by voice vote with Senator Vitter recorded as voting no. On October 5, 2015, the United States Senate confirmed him by a 69–21 vote. He received his judicial commission on November 2, 2015.

Legal offices
Preceded by Anthony W. Ishii	Judge of the United States District Court for the Eastern District of California; 2015–present	Incumbent
