= John Mendez =

American judge (born 1955)

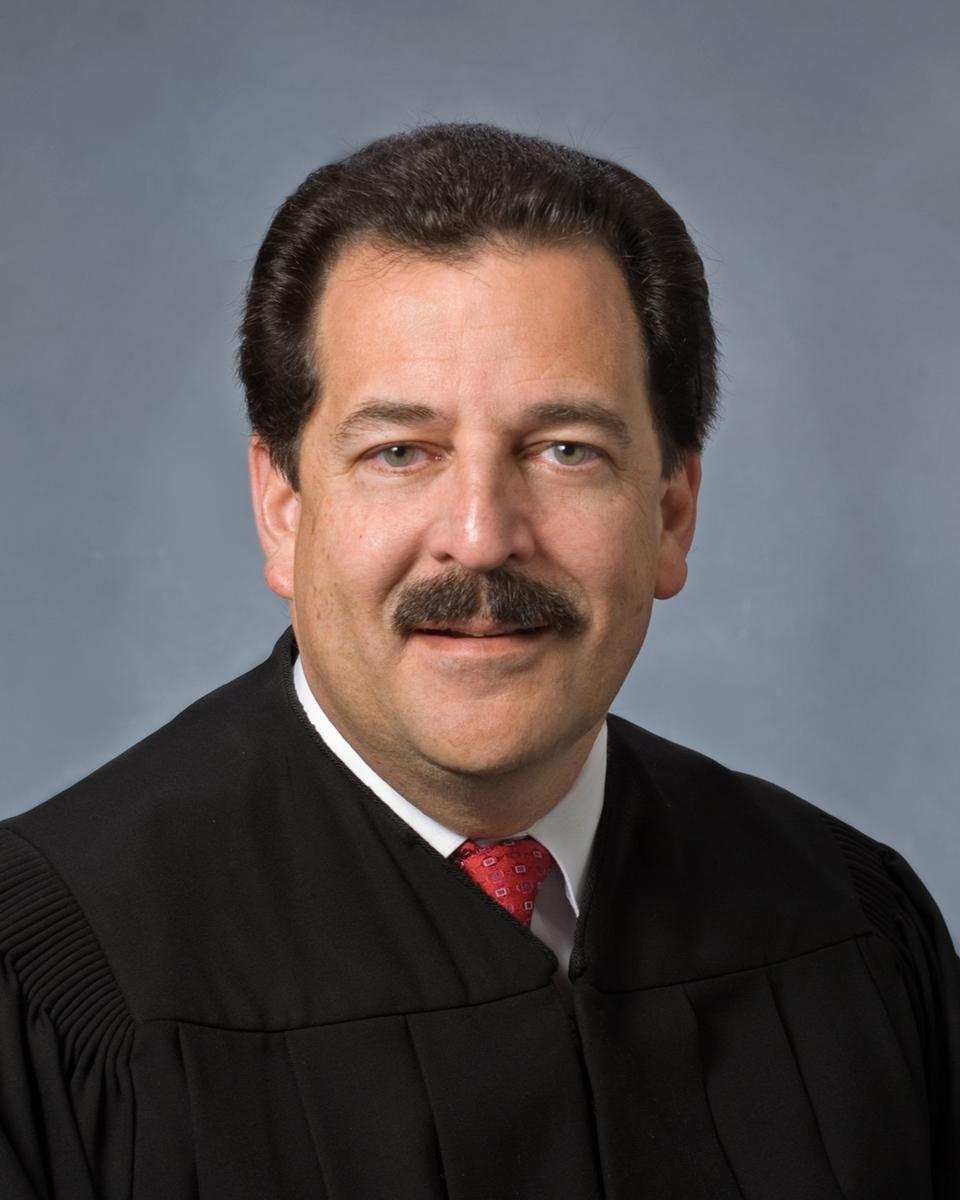

Senior Judge of the United States District Court for the Eastern District of California
- Incumbent
- Assumed office April 17, 2022

Judge of the United States District Court for the Eastern District of California
- In office April 17, 2008 – April 17, 2022
- Appointed by: George W. Bush
- Preceded by: David F. Levi
- Succeeded by: Daniel Calabretta

Judge of the Sacramento County Superior Court
- In office 2001–2008

Personal details
- Born: John Anthony Mendez; September 4, 1955 (age 70) Oakland, California, U.S.
- Education: Stanford University (BA); Harvard University (JD)

John Anthony Mendez (born September 4, 1955) is a senior United States district judge of the United States District Court for the Eastern District of California.

== Early life and education ==
Mendez was born in Oakland, California in 1955 and raised in San Leandro, California. He received a Bachelor of Arts degree from Stanford University in 1977. He then obtained a Juris Doctor from Harvard Law School in 1980, where he was a member of the Board of Student Advisers. An avid baseball fan, Mendez was once under consideration for the job of Major League Baseball commissioner.

== Career ==
Mendez worked in private practice in California from 1980 to 1984 and from 1986 to 1992. Between 1984 and 1986, he served as an Assistant United States Attorney for the Northern District of California. From 1992 to 1993, he was the United States Attorney for the Northern District of California. In 1993, Mendez again returned to private practice. Mendez served as a judge on the Sacramento County Superior Court for the State of California between 2001 and 2008.

== Federal judicial service ==
He was nominated by President George W. Bush on September 6, 2007, to a seat vacated by David F. Levi. He was confirmed by the United States Senate on April 10, 2008, and received his commission on April 17, 2008. He assumed senior status on April 17, 2022.

== See also ==
- List of Hispanic and Latino American jurists

Legal offices
Preceded by David F. Levi	Judge of the United States District Court for the Eastern District of California; 2008–2022	Succeeded by Daniel Calabretta
