= Campbell E. Beaumont =

American judge

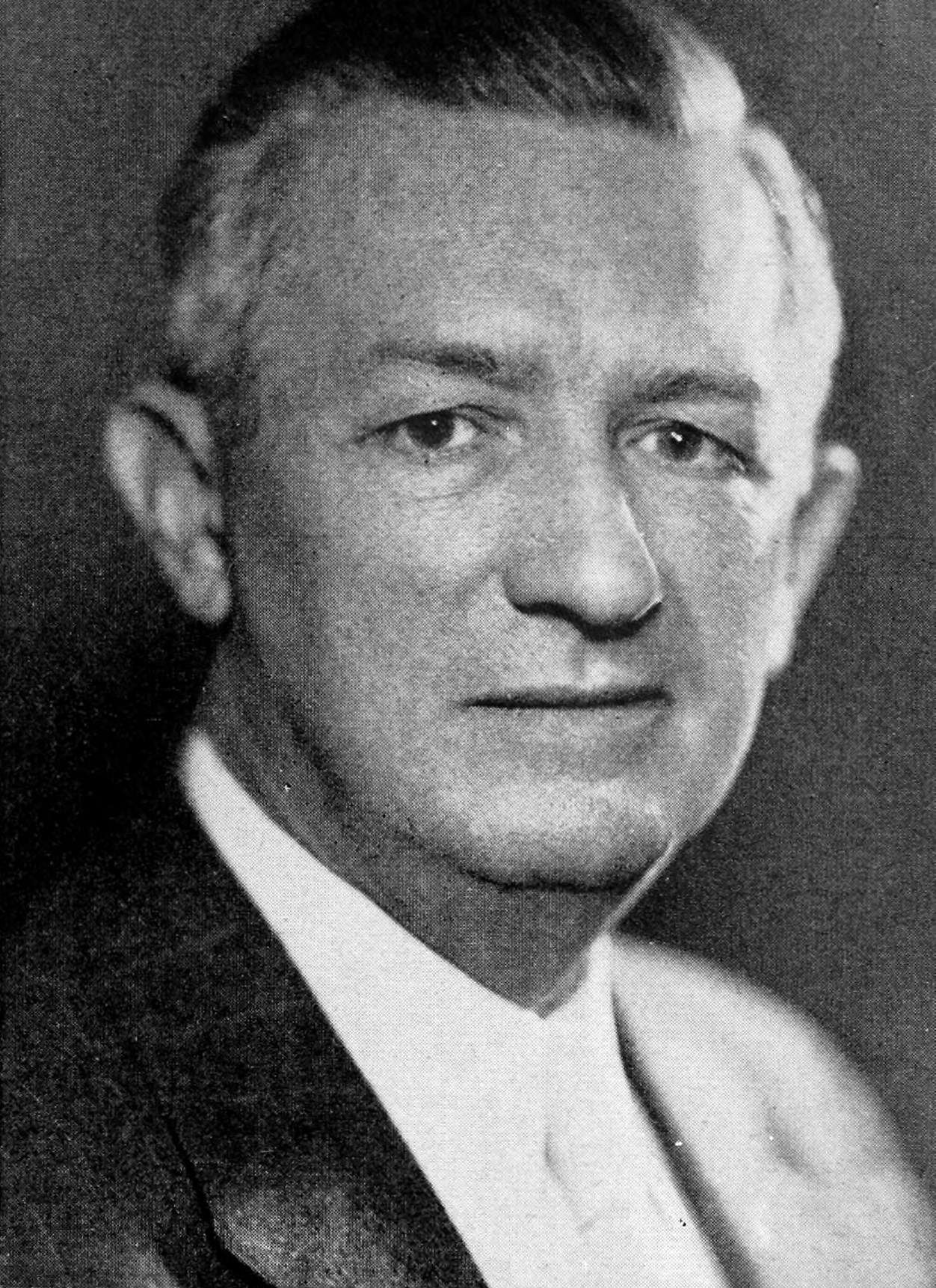
- Beaumont c. 1940

Judge of the United States District Court for the Southern District of California
- In office August 5, 1939 – November 19, 1954
- Appointed by: Franklin D. Roosevelt
- Preceded by: Seat established by 52 Stat. 584
- Succeeded by: Gilbert H. Jertberg

Personal details
- Born: Campbell Eben Beaumont; August 27, 1883 Mayfield, Kentucky, U.S.
- Died: November 19, 1954 (aged 71)
- Education: Cumberland School of Law (LL.B.)

Campbell Eben Beaumont (August 27, 1883 – November 19, 1954) was a United States district judge of the United States District Court for the Southern District of California.

== Education and career ==
Born in Mayfield, Kentucky, Beaumont was in the Kentucky National Guard from 1904 to 1906, and received a Bachelor of Laws from the Cumberland School of Law (then part of Cumberland University, now part of Samford University) in 1910. He was in private practice from 1912 to 1914, when he became a deputy district attorney of Fresno County, California, serving from 1914 to 1917. He was an assistant district attorney of Fresno County in 1917, and was the district attorney of that county from 1918 to 1921. He was a judge of the California Superior Court from 1921 to 1939.

== Federal judicial service ==
On July 27, 1939, Beaumont was nominated by President Franklin D. Roosevelt to a new seat on the United States District Court for the Southern District of California created by 52 Stat. 584. He was confirmed by the United States Senate on August 1, 1939, and received his commission on August 5, 1939. Beaumont served in that capacity until his death on November 19, 1954.

== Sources ==
Legal offices
Preceded by Seat established by 52 Stat. 584	Judge of the United States District Court for the Southern District of California; 1939–1954	Succeeded by Gilbert H. Jertberg
