= Morrison C. England Jr. =

American judge (born 1954)

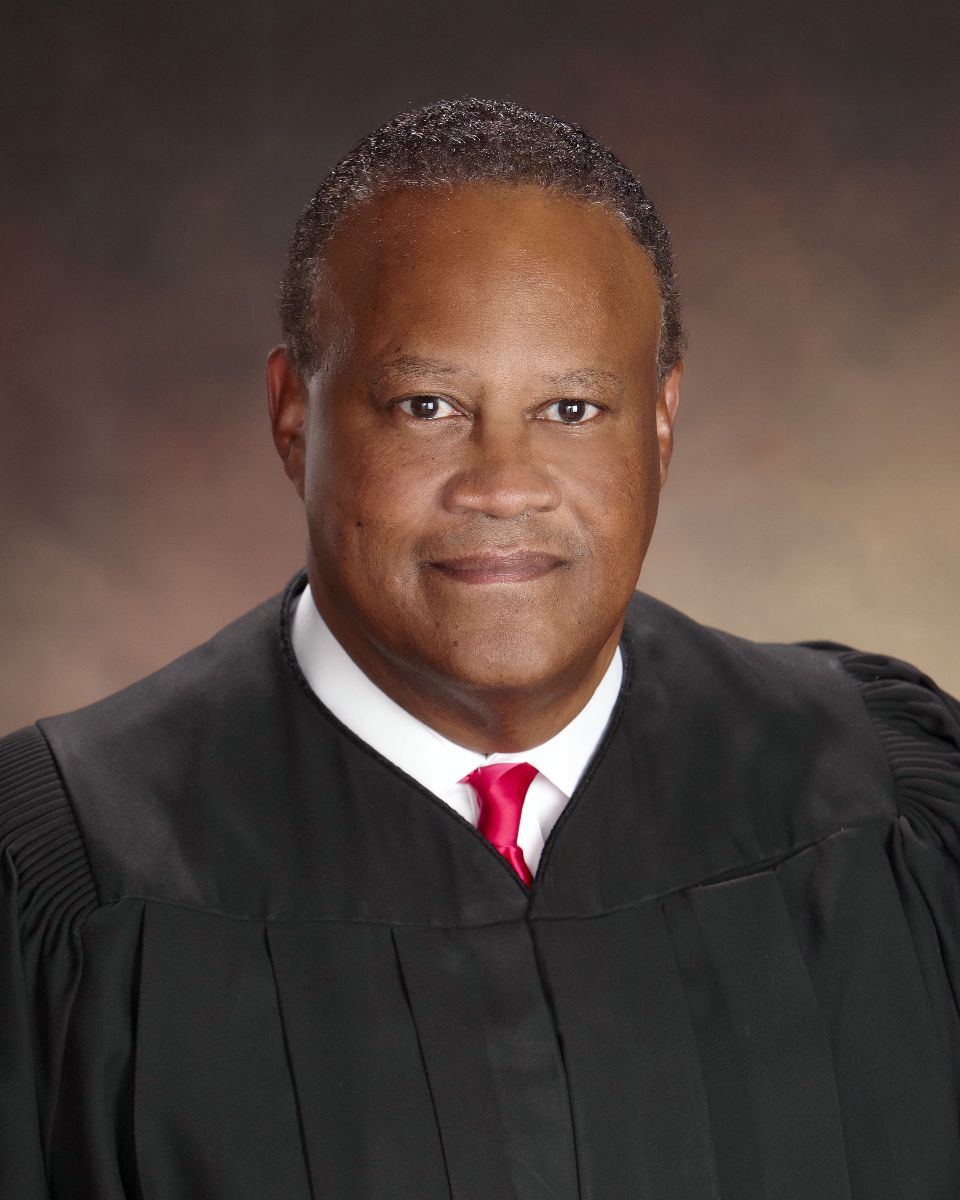

Senior Judge of the United States District Court for the Eastern District of California
- In office December 17, 2019 – October 4, 2024

Chief Judge of the United States District Court for the Eastern District of California
- In office May 1, 2012 – April 30, 2016
- Preceded by: Anthony W. Ishii
- Succeeded by: Lawrence Joseph O'Neill

Judge of the United States District Court for the Eastern District of California
- In office August 2, 2002 – December 17, 2019
- Appointed by: George W. Bush
- Preceded by: Lawrence K. Karlton
- Succeeded by: Ana de Alba

Judge of the Sacramento County Superior Court
- In office August 7, 1996 – August 2, 2002
- Appointed by: Pete Wilson
- Constituency: Municipal (1996–1997); County (1997–2002)

Personal details
- Born: Morrison Cohen England Jr. December 17, 1954 (age 71) St. Louis, Missouri, U.S.
- Spouse: Laura Moreno
- Children: 3
- Education: University of the Pacific (BA, JD)

Military service
- Branch/service: United States Army Reserve
- Years of service: 1988–2002
- Rank: Major
- Unit: J.A.G. Corps
- Awards: Meritorious Service Medal

Morrison Cohen England Jr. (born December 17, 1954) is a former United States district judge of the United States District Court for the Eastern District of California.

== Early life and education ==
Born in St. Louis, Missouri, England received a Bachelor of Arts degree from the University of the Pacific in 1977 and a Juris Doctor from University of the Pacific, McGeorge School of Law in 1983. He served in the United States Army Reserve from 1988 to 2002.

== Career ==
In 1973 he was an electronic data processing clerk for the California Department of Motor Vehicles. In 1976 he was a free agent with the New York Jets. From 1976 to 1982 he was an assistant football coach at California State University, Fullerton and California State University, Sacramento. From 1978 to 1980 he was an assistant resident manager and law clerk at FPI Management Inc in Sacramento. From 1980 to 1981 he was an on-call counselor with the Sacramento County Juvenile Court. From 1981 to 1983 he was a law clerk at the law firm of Quattrin & Clemons. England was in private practice in California from 1983 to 1988. From 1988 to 2002, he served with the United States Army Reserve, JAG Corps. From 1988 to 1996, he was a partner with the law firm of Quattrin, Johnson, Campora & England. Between 1996 and 1997, England was a judge on the Municipal Court of California in the County of Sacramento. He served as a judge on the Sacramento Superior Court for the State of California between 1996 and 2002.

=== Federal judicial service ===
On March 21, 2002, England was nominated by President George W. Bush to serve as a United States district judge of the United States District Court for the Eastern District of California, to a seat vacated by Judge Lawrence K. Karlton. He was confirmed by the United States Senate on August 1, 2002, and received his commission on August 2, 2002. He served as Chief Judge from May 1, 2012, to April 30, 2016. He assumed senior status on December 17, 2019, his 65th birthday. England retired from active service on October 4, 2024.

== Notable ruling ==
On September 19, 2019, England issued a preliminary injunction against a California law which would require candidates for president to disclose their tax returns in order to be listed on the ballot.

== Awards and recognition ==
2013: Martin Luther King Jr. Peace and Justice Award from the University of the Pacific.

== See also ==
- List of African-American federal judges
- List of African-American jurists

== Sources ==
- 107-2 Hearings: Confirmation Hearings on Federal Appointments, S. Hrg. 107-584, Part 4, May 9, May 23, June 13, June 27, and July 23, 2002, *

Legal offices
Preceded by Lawrence K. Karlton	Judge of the United States District Court for the Eastern District of California; 2002–2019	Succeeded by Ana de Alba
Preceded by Anthony W. Ishii	Chief Judge of the United States District Court for the Eastern District of California; 2012–2016	Succeeded by Lawrence Joseph O'Neill
