= Thomas Jamison MacBride =

American judge (1914–2000)

Judge of the United States Foreign Intelligence Surveillance Court
- In office May 19, 1979 – May 18, 1980
- Appointed by: Warren Burger
- Preceded by: new seat
- Succeeded by: William Clark O'Kelley

Senior Judge of the United States District Court for the Eastern District of California
- In office March 25, 1979 – January 6, 2000

Chief Judge of the United States District Court for the Eastern District of California
- In office 1967–1979
- Preceded by: Myron Donovan Crocker
- Succeeded by: Philip Charles Wilkins

Judge of the United States District Court for the Eastern District of California
- In office September 18, 1966 – March 25, 1979
- Appointed by: operation of law
- Preceded by: Seat established by 80 Stat. 75
- Succeeded by: Lawrence K. Karlton

Judge of the United States District Court for the Northern District of California
- In office September 22, 1961 – September 18, 1966
- Appointed by: John F. Kennedy
- Preceded by: Seat established by 75 Stat. 80
- Succeeded by: Seat abolished

Member of the California State Assembly from the 8th district
- In office January 7, 1957 - January 2, 1961
- Preceded by: Gordon A. Fleury
- Succeeded by: William Adolphus “Jimmy” Hicks

Personal details
- Born: Thomas Jamison MacBride; March 25, 1914 Sacramento, California, U.S.
- Died: January 6, 2000 (aged 85) Sacramento, California, U.S.
- Party: Democratic
- Education: University of California, Berkeley (AB, JD)

Military service
- Allegiance: United States
- Branch/service: United States Navy
- Years of service: 1942–1946
- Battles/wars: World War II

Thomas Jamison MacBride (March 25, 1914 – January 6, 2000) was a United States district judge of the United States District Court for the Northern District of California and the United States District Court for the Eastern District of California.

== Education and career ==
He was born in Sacramento, California and attended Sacramento High School. He received an Artium Baccalaureus degree from the University of California, Berkeley in 1936 and a Juris Doctor from the UC Berkeley School of Law in 1940. He was a law clerk for the Office of the Deputy State Attorney General of California from 1940 to 1942. He was in the United States Naval Reserve during World War II, from 1942 to 1946. While in the Navy, he served as a Combat Intelligence Officer with the Seventh Fleet Headquarters of General Douglas MacArthur in Brisbane, Australia. He was in private practice in Sacramento from 1946 to 1961.

== California Legislature ==
MacBridge also served as a State Assembly member for the 8th district from January 7, 1957 - January 2, 1961.

== Federal judicial service ==
MacBride was nominated by President John F. Kennedy on September 14, 1961, to the United States District Court for the Northern District of California, to a new seat authorized by 75 Stat. 80. He was confirmed by the United States Senate on September 21, 1961, and received his commission on September 22, 1961. He was reassigned by operation of law to the United States District Court for the Eastern District of California on September 18, 1966, to a new seat authorized by 80 Stat. 75. He served as Chief Judge from 1967 to 1979. He was a member of the Judicial Conference of the United States from 1975 to 1978. He was a Judge of the United States Foreign Intelligence Surveillance Court from 1979 to 1980. He was a Judge of the Temporary Emergency Court of Appeals from 1982 to 1987. He assumed senior status on March 25, 1979. His service terminated on January 6, 2000, due to his death in Sacramento.

== Sources ==
Legal offices
Preceded by Seat established by 75 Stat. 80	Judge of the United States District Court for the Northern District of California; 1961–1966	Succeeded by Seat abolished
Preceded by Seat established by 80 Stat. 75	Judge of the United States District Court for the Eastern District of California; 1966–1979	Succeeded by Lawrence K. Karlton
Preceded by Myron Donovan Crocker	Chief Judge of the United States District Court for the Eastern District of California; 1967–1979	Succeeded by Philip Charles Wilkins
New seat	Judge of the United States Foreign Intelligence Surveillance Court; 1979–1980	Succeeded by William Clark O'Kelley
