= Myron Donovan Crocker =

American judge

Senior Judge of the United States District Court for the Eastern District of California
- In office January 1, 1981 – February 2, 2010

Chief Judge of the United States District Court for the Eastern District of California
- In office 1966–1967
- Preceded by: Office established
- Succeeded by: Thomas Jamison MacBride

Judge of the United States District Court for the Eastern District of California
- In office September 18, 1966 – January 1, 1981
- Appointed by: operation of law
- Preceded by: Seat established by 80 Stat. 75
- Succeeded by: Robert Everett Coyle

Judge of the United States District Court for the Southern District of California
- In office September 21, 1959 – September 18, 1966
- Appointed by: Dwight D. Eisenhower
- Preceded by: Gilbert H. Jertberg
- Succeeded by: Seat abolished

Personal details
- Born: Myron Donovan Crocker; September 4, 1915 Pasadena, California, U.S.
- Died: February 2, 2010 (aged 94) Chowchilla, California, U.S.
- Education: Fresno State College (A.B.); UC Berkeley School of Law (LL.B.)

Myron Donovan Crocker (September 4, 1915 – February 2, 2010) was a United States district judge of the United States District Court for the Southern District of California and the United States District Court for the Eastern District of California.

== Education and career ==
Born in Pasadena, California, Crocker received an Artium Baccalaureus degree from Fresno State College (now California State University, Fresno) in 1937 and a Bachelor of Laws from the UC Berkeley School of Law in 1940. He was a special agent with the Federal Bureau of Investigation from 1940 to 1946. He entered private practice in Chowchilla, California in 1946, and was an assistant district attorney of Madera County, California from 1946 to 1951. He was then a Judge of the Chowchilla Justice Court from 1952 to 1958, and on the Superior Court of Madera County from 1958 to 1959.

== Federal judicial service ==
Crocker was nominated by President Dwight D. Eisenhower on February 16, 1959, to a seat on the United States District Court for the Southern District of California vacated by Judge Gilbert H. Jertberg. He was confirmed by the United States Senate on September 14, 1959, and received his commission on September 21, 1959. Crocker was reassigned by operation of law on September 18, 1966, to the United States District Court for the Eastern District of California, to a new seat authorized by 80 Stat. 75. He served as Chief Judge from 1966 to 1967. He assumed senior status on January 1, 1981. His service terminated on February 2, 2010, due to his death in Chowchilla. He was the last surviving appointee from the Eisenhower administration remaining on the federal bench.

== See also ==
- List of United States federal judges by longevity of service

== Sources ==
Legal offices
Preceded by Gilbert H. Jertberg	Judge of the United States District Court for the Southern District of California; 1959–1966	Succeeded by Seat abolished
Preceded by Seat established by 80 Stat. 75	Judge of the United States District Court for the Eastern District of California; 1966–1981	Succeeded by Robert Everett Coyle
Preceded by Office established	Chief Judge of the United States District Court for the Eastern District of California; 1966–1967	Succeeded by Thomas Jamison MacBride
