= Courts of California =

Courts of California include:

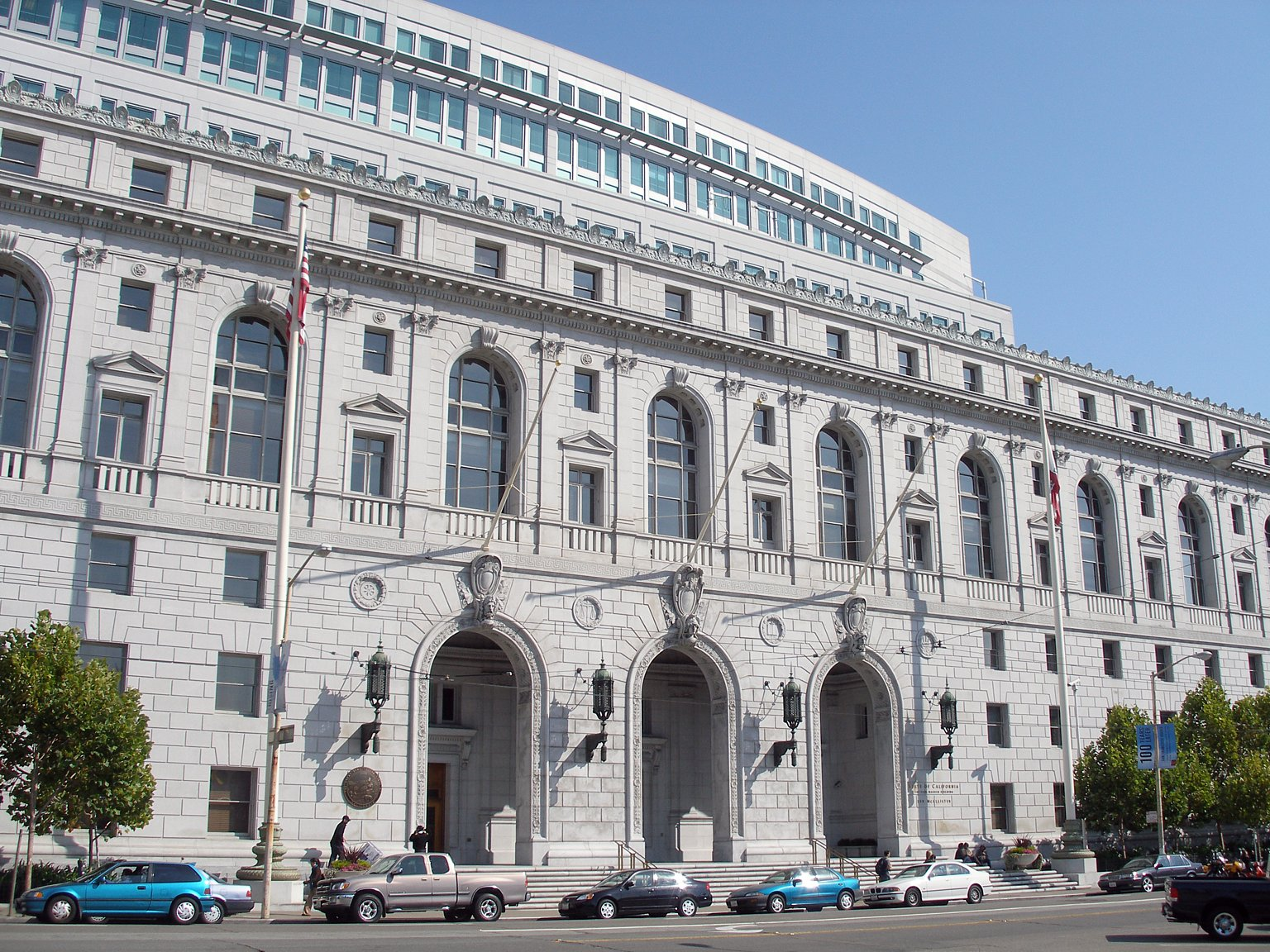
Headquarters of the Supreme Court of California, in San Francisco.

State courts of record of California

- Supreme Court of California
  - California Courts of Appeal (6 appellate districts)
    - Superior Courts of California (58 courts, one for each county)

State quasi-administrative courts of California

- State Bar Court of California; an administrative court within the judicial branch, subordinate to the California Supreme Court

Federal courts located in California

- United States Court of Appeals for the Ninth Circuit (headquartered in San Francisco, having jurisdiction over the United States District Courts of Alaska, Arizona, California, Guam, Hawaii, Idaho, Montana, Nevada, the Northern Mariana Islands, Oregon, and Washington)
  - United States District Court for the Central District of California
  - United States District Court for the Eastern District of California
  - United States District Court for the Northern District of California
  - United States District Court for the Southern District of California

Former federal courts of California

- United States District Court for the District of California (extinct, subdivided)

== See also ==
- Judiciary of California
