= United States District Court for the Eastern District of California =

U.S. federal district court in California

- (E.D. Cal.)
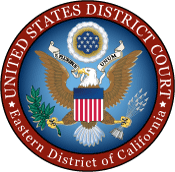

- The district's jurisdiction by county with the two non-federal land divisions shown. Sacramento Division (north) Fresno Division (south)
- Location: Robert T. Matsui U.S. Courthouse (Sacramento) More locations: Robert E. Coyle U.S. Courthouse (Fresno); Redding; Bakersfield; Yosemite
- Appeals to: Ninth Circuit
- Established: September 18, 1966
- Judges: 6
- Chief Judge: Troy Nunley

Officers of the court
- U.S. Attorney: Eric Grant
- U.S. Marshal: Lasha Boyden (acting)
- www.caed.uscourts.gov

The United States District Court for the Eastern District of California (in case citations, E.D. Cal.) is a federal court in the Ninth Circuit (except for patent claims and claims against the U.S. government under the Tucker Act, which are appealed to the Federal Circuit).

The District was created on March 18, 1966, with the division of the Northern and Southern districts, leading to the creation of the Central and Eastern districts.

The United States Attorney's Office for the Eastern District of California represents the United States in civil and criminal litigation in the court. As of December 4, 2025 the United States attorney is Eric Grant.

== Organization of the court ==
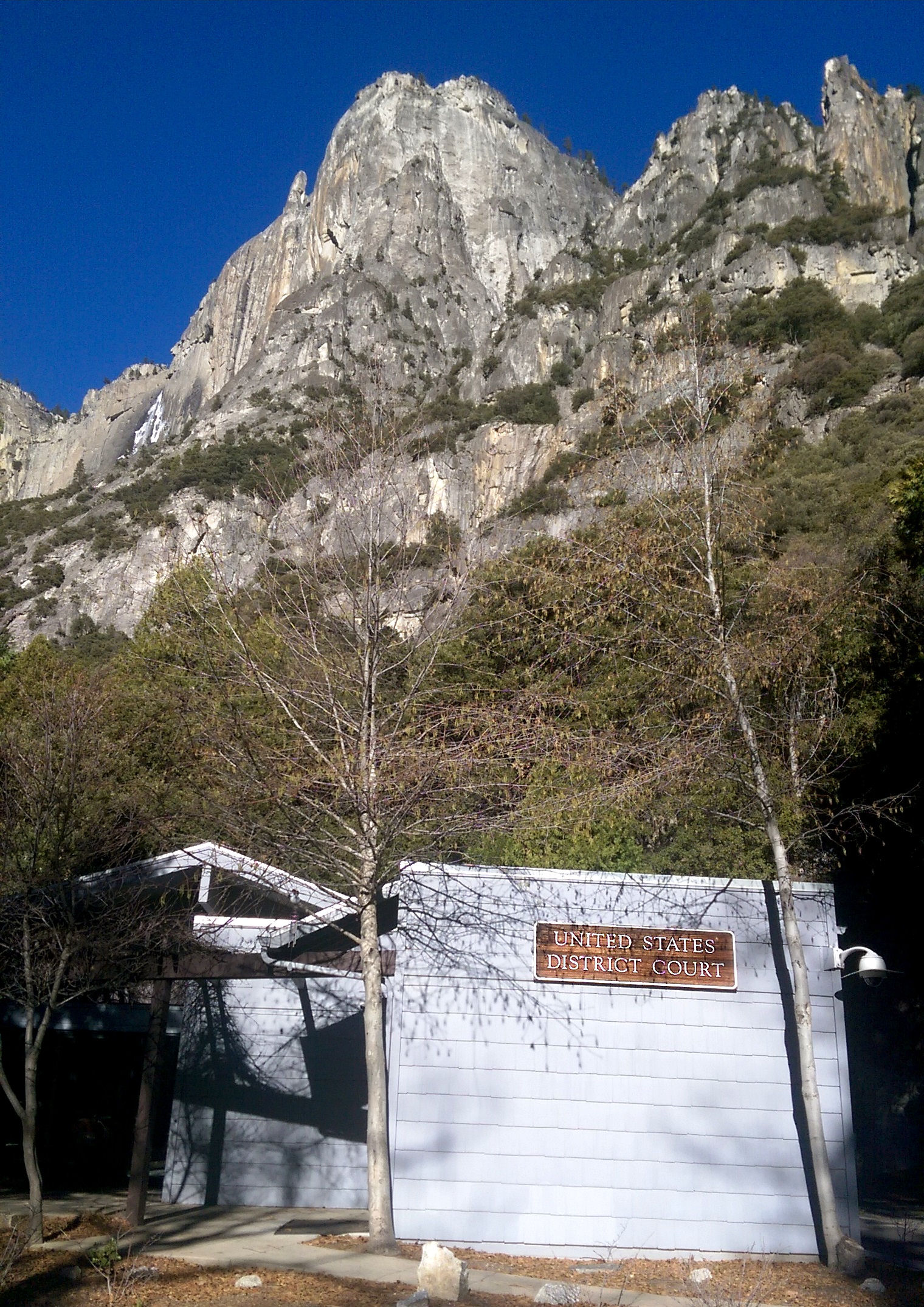
Yosemite Office of the United States District Court for the Eastern District of California located in Yosemite National Park

The United States District Court for the Eastern District of California is one of four federal judicial districts in California. Court for the District is held at the Robert E. Coyle U.S. Courthouse in Fresno and Robert T. Matsui U.S. Courthouse in Sacramento.

- Fresno Division comprises the following counties: Calaveras, Fresno, Inyo, Kern, Kings, Madera, Mariposa, Merced, Stanislaus, Tulare, and Tuolumne.
- Sacramento Division comprises the following counties: Alpine, Amador, Butte, Colusa, El Dorado, Glenn, Lassen, Modoc, Mono, Nevada, Placer, Plumas, Sacramento, San Joaquin, Shasta, Sierra, Siskiyou, Solano, Sutter, Tehama, Trinity, Yolo, and Yuba.
- Bakersfield Office hears misdemeanor and petty criminal offenses on federal lands and National Parks in Inyo and Kern counties. Court is held at Bakersfield, Edwards Air Force Base, and Ridgecrest.
- Redding Office hears misdemeanor and petty criminal offenses on federal lands and National Parks in Northern California. Court is held at Sierra Army Depot, Redding, and Susanville.
- Yosemite Office hears misdemeanor and petty criminal offenses in Yosemite National Park. On April 15, 1919, the California State Legislature has ceded the states criminal jurisdiction to the federal government in Yosemite, Kings Canyon, and Sequoia National Parks. The perennially large crowds of tourists at these parks and the absence of state law criminal jurisdiction in these parks create a unique situation justifying the presence of a courthouse inside the park itself. (Note: Almost all crimes in the United States are prosecuted by the state at the state level)

== Current judges ==
As of January 4, 2026:

#	Title	Judge	Duty station	Born	Term of service			Appointed by
#	Title	Judge	Duty station	Born	Active	Chief	Senior	Appointed by
21	Chief Judge	Troy Nunley	Sacramento	1964	2013–present	2024–present	—	Obama
22	District Judge	Dale A. Drozd	Sacramento	1955	2015–present	—	—	Obama
23	District Judge	Jennifer L. Thurston	Fresno	1967	2021–present	—	—	Biden
25	District Judge	Daniel Calabretta	Sacramento	1978	2023–present	—	—	Biden
26	District Judge	Kirk E. Sherriff	Fresno	1968	2024–present	—	—	Biden
27	District Judge	Dena M. Coggins	Sacramento	1979	2024–present	—	—	Biden
11	Senior Judge	William B. Shubb	Sacramento	1938	1990–2004	1996–2003	2004–present	G.H.W. Bush
14	Senior Judge	Garland E. Burrell Jr.	inactive	1947	1992–2012	2007–2008	2012–present	G.H.W. Bush
15	Senior Judge	Anthony W. Ishii	inactive	1946	1997–2012	2008–2012	2012–present	Clinton
18	Senior Judge	Lawrence Joseph O'Neill	inactive	1952	2007–2020	2016–2019	2020–present	G.W. Bush
19	Senior Judge	John Mendez	Sacramento	1955	2008–2022	—	2022–present	G.W. Bush

== Former judges ==
#	Judge	Born–died	Active service	Chief Judge	Senior status	Appointed by	Reason for termination
1	Myron Donovan Crocker	1915–2010	1966–1981 (Note: Reassigned from the Southern District of California.)	1966–1967	1981–2010	Eisenhower/Operation of law	death
2	Sherrill Halbert	1901–1991	1966–1969	—	1969–1991	Eisenhower/Operation of law	death
3	Thomas Jamison MacBride	1914–2000	1966–1979 (Note: Reassigned from the Northern District of California.)	1967–1979	1979–2000	Kennedy/Operation of law	death
4	Philip Charles Wilkins	1913–1998	1969–1983	1979–1983	1983–1998	Nixon	death
5	Lawrence K. Karlton	1935–2015	1979–2000	1983–1990	2000–2015	Carter	death
6	Milton Lewis Schwartz	1920–2005	1979–1990	—	1990–2005	Carter	death
7	Edward Dean Price	1919–1997	1979–1989	—	1989–1997	Carter	death
8	Raul Anthony Ramirez	1944–present	1980–1989	—	—	Carter	resignation
9	Robert Everett Coyle	1930–2012	1982–1996	1990–1996	1996–2012	Reagan	death
10	Edward J. Garcia	1928–2023	1984–1996	—	1996–2023	Reagan	death
12	David F. Levi	1951–present	1990–2007	2003–2007	—	G.H.W. Bush	resignation
13	Oliver Winston Wanger	1940–present	1991–2006	—	2006–2011	G.H.W. Bush	retirement
16	Frank C. Damrell Jr.	1938–present	1997–2008	—	2008–2011	Clinton	retirement
17	Morrison C. England Jr.	1954–present	2002–2019	2012–2016	2019–2024	G.W. Bush	retirement
20	Kimberly J. Mueller	1957–present	2010–2024	2020–2024	2024–2026	Obama	retirement
24	Ana de Alba	1979–present	2022–2023	—	—	Biden	elevation

== Chief judges ==
Chief judges have administrative responsibilities with respect to their district court. Unlike the Supreme Court, where one justice is specifically nominated to be chief, the office of chief judge rotates among the district court judges. To be chief, a judge must have been in active service on the court for at least one year, be under the age of 65, and have not previously served as chief judge.

A vacancy is filled by the judge highest in seniority among the group of qualified judges. The chief judge serves for a term of seven years, or until age 70, whichever occurs first. The age restrictions are waived if no members of the court would otherwise be qualified for the position.

When the office was created in 1948, the chief judge was the longest-serving judge who had not elected to retire, on what has since 1958 been known as senior status, or declined to serve as chief judge. After August 6, 1959, judges could not become or remain chief after turning 70 years old. The current rules have been in operation since October 1, 1982.

== Succession of seats ==
Seat 1
Seat reassigned from Southern District on September 18, 1966 by 80 Stat. 75
Crocker	1966–1981
Coyle	1982–1996
Ishii	1997–2012
Drozd	2015–present

Seat 2
Seat reassigned from Northern District on September 18, 1966 by 80 Stat. 75
Halbert	1966–1969
Wilkins	1969–1983
Garcia	1984–1996
Damrell, Jr.	1997–2008
Mueller	2010–2024
Coggins	2024–present

Seat 3
Seat reassigned from Northern District on September 18, 1966 by 80 Stat. 75
MacBride	1966–1979
Karlton	1979–2000
England, Jr.	2002–2019
de Alba	2022–2023
Sherriff	2024–present

Seat 4
Seat established on October 20, 1978 by 92 Stat. 1629
Schwartz	1979–1990
Wanger	1991–2006
O'Neill	2007–2020
Thurston	2021–present

Seat 5
Seat established on October 20, 1978 by 92 Stat. 1629
Price	1979–1989
Levi	1990–2007
Mendez	2008–2022
Calabretta	2023–present

Seat 6
Seat established on October 20, 1978 by 92 Stat. 1629
Ramirez	1980–1989
Shubb	1990–2004
Seat abolished on November 1, 2004 (temporary judgeship expired)

Seat 7
Seat established on December 1, 1990 by 104 Stat. 5089 (temporary)
Seat became permanent upon the abolition of Seat 6 on November 1, 2004
Burrell, Jr.	1992–2012
Nunley	2013–present

== Request for expansion ==
The six sitting judges and three senior judges have submitted a draft letter to the members of the Senate and House of Representatives from the Eastern District in which they argue that population growth in the district has necessitated an increase in the number of district judges.

== US attorney ==
- John P. Hyland 1966–1970
- Duane D. Keyes 1970–1977
- Herman Sillas, Jr. 1977–1980
- William B. Shubb 1980–1981
- Francis M. Goldsberry II 1981
- Donald B. Ayer 1981–1986
- Peter A. Nowinski 1986–1987
- David F. Levi 1987–1990
- Richard Jenkins 1990–1991
- George L. O'Connell 1991–93
- Robert M. Twiss 1993
- Charles J. Stevens 1993–1997
- Paul Seave 1997–2001
- McGregor W. Scott 2003–2009
- Lawrence G Brown 2009
- Benjamin B. Wagner 2009–2016
- Phillip Talbert 2016–2017
- McGregor W. Scott 2017–2021
- Phillip Talbert 2021–2025
- Michele Beckwith 2025-July 15, 2025 (acting)
- Eric Grant 2025–present

== See also ==
- Courts of California
- List of current United States district judges
- List of United States federal courthouses in California
