= Daniel Calabretta =

American judge (born 1978)

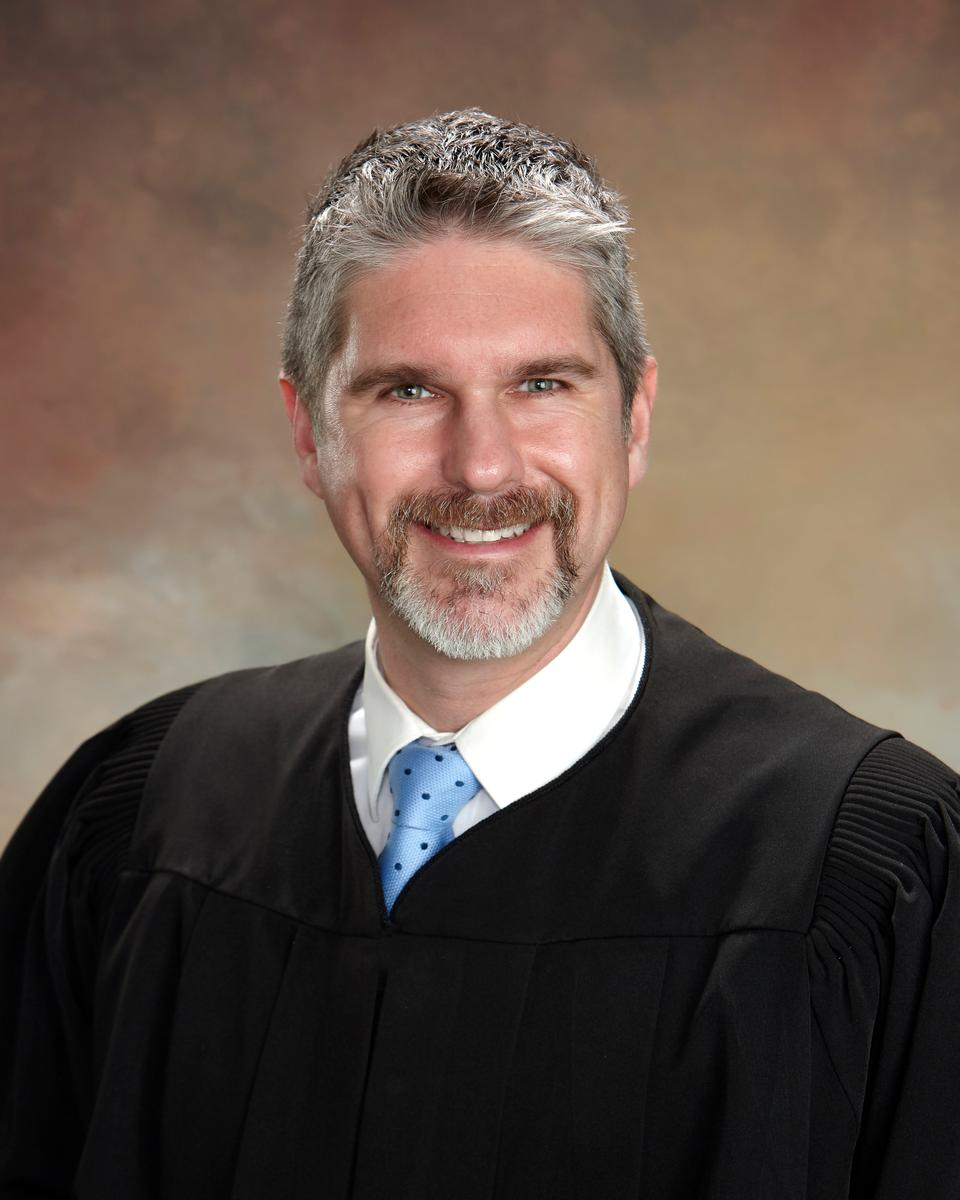

Judge of the United States District Court for the Eastern District of California
- Incumbent
- Assumed office February 21, 2023
- Appointed by: Joe Biden
- Preceded by: John Mendez

Judge of the Sacramento County Superior Court
- In office 2019 – February 21, 2023
- Appointed by: Jerry Brown
- Preceded by: Cheryl Meegan
- Succeeded by: Richard Miadich

Personal details
- Born: Daniel Joe Powell; 1978 (age 47–48) Union City, Tennessee, U.S.
- Party: Democratic
- Spouse: Jonathan Calabretta (m. 2014)
- Education: Princeton University (BA); University of Chicago (JD)

Daniel Joe Calabretta (né Powell, born 1978) is a United States district judge of the United States District Court for the Eastern District of California.

== Early life and education ==
Calabretta was born in Union City, Tennessee, to Kathleen G. Van Ness. He was adopted by Charles L. Silber. He received a Bachelor of Arts from Princeton University in 2000 and a J.D. degree from the University of Chicago Law School in 2003.

== Legal and academic career ==
Calabretta served as a law clerk for Judge William A. Fletcher of the United States Court of Appeals for the Ninth Circuit from 2003 to 2004 and Associate Justice John Paul Stevens of the United States Supreme Court from 2004 to 2005. From 2005 to 2008, he was an associate at Munger, Tolles and Olson. From 2008 to 2013, he served as a deputy attorney general in the California Department of Justice. From 2013 to 2018, he served as deputy legal affairs secretary in the Office of Governor Jerry Brown. Calabretta taught a "Direct Democracy in California" course at UC Davis School of Law in 2021 and 2022 and at Lincoln Law School of Sacramento in 2022.

== Judicial career ==
=== State court service ===
In 2018, California Governor Jerry Brown appointed Calabretta to serve as a judge of the Sacramento County Superior Court.

=== Federal judicial service ===
On July 29, 2022, President Joe Biden announced his intent to nominate Calabretta to serve as a United States district judge of the United States District Court for the Eastern District of California. On August 1, 2022, his nomination was sent to the Senate. President Biden nominated Calabretta to the seat vacated by Judge John Mendez, who assumed senior status on April 27, 2022. On October 12, 2022, a hearing on his nomination was held before the Senate Judiciary Committee. On December 1, 2022, his nomination was reported out of committee by a 12–10 vote. On January 3, 2023, his nomination was returned to the President under Rule XXXI, Paragraph 6 of the United States Senate; he was renominated later the same day. On February 2, 2023, his nomination was reported out of committee by an 11–9 vote. On February 15, 2023, the Senate invoked cloture on his nomination by a 52–46 vote. On February 16, 2023, his nomination was confirmed by a 51–45 vote. He received his judicial commission on February 21, 2023. He is the first openly gay judge to serve on the Eastern District of California.

==== Notable rulings ====
On July 31, 2024, Calbretta dismissed a lawsuit by the Republican National Committee against Google, which alleged that Gmail improperly and intentionally routed fundraising emails to Gmail users' spam folders, ruling Google violated no legislative policy or harmed its users.

== Personal life ==
Powell married Jonathan McClean Calabretta on December 13, 2014, in Sacramento, California.

== See also ==
- List of LGBT jurists in the United States
- List of law clerks for the fourth seat of the Supreme Court of the United States

Legal offices
Preceded by John Mendez	Judge of the United States District Court for the Eastern District of California; 2023–present	Incumbent
