= Anthony W. Ishii =

American judge (born 1946)

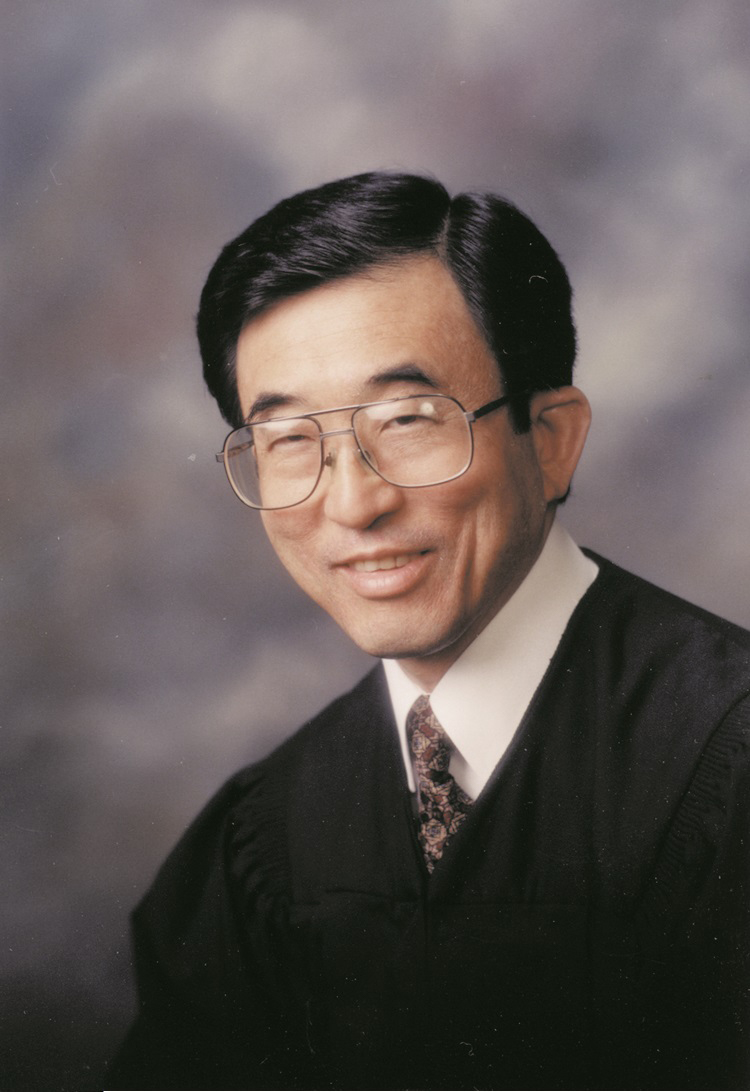

Senior Judge of the United States District Court for the Eastern District of California
- Incumbent
- Assumed office October 31, 2012

Chief Judge of the United States District Court for the Eastern District of California
- In office 2008–2012
- Preceded by: Garland Ellis Burrell Jr.
- Succeeded by: Morrison C. England Jr.

Judge of the United States District Court for the Eastern District of California
- In office October 14, 1997 – October 31, 2012
- Appointed by: Bill Clinton
- Preceded by: Robert Everett Coyle
- Succeeded by: Dale A. Drozd

Personal details
- Born: Anthony Wayne Ishii; 1946 (age 79–80) Santa Ana, California, U.S.
- Education: Reedley College (AS); University of the Pacific (PharmD); University of California, Berkeley (JD)

Anthony Wayne Ishii (born 1946) is a senior United States district judge of the United States District Court for the Eastern District of California.

== Early life and education ==
Born in Santa Ana, California, Ishii received an Associate of Science degree from Reedley Junior College in 1966, a Doctor of Pharmacy from the University of the Pacific School of Pharmacy in 1970, and a Juris Doctor from the University of California, Berkeley, Boalt Hall School of Law in 1973.

== Career ==
He was a deputy in the City Attorney's Office of Sacramento, California in 1975, and a deputy public defender, Public Defender's Office, County of Fresno, California in 1979. He was in private practice in Fresno, California, from 1979 to 1983. He was a Justice Court judge, Parlier-Selma Judicial District, County of Fresno, California, from 1983 to 1993, and a Municipal Court judge, Central Valley Municipal Court, County of Fresno, California from 1994 to 1997.

== Federal judicial service ==
On February 12, 1997, Ishii was nominated by President Bill Clinton to a seat on the United States District Court for the Eastern District of California vacated by Robert E. Coyle. Ishii was confirmed by the United States Senate on October 9, 1997, and received his commission on October 14, 1997, becoming the first Asian Pacific American judge on the United States District Court for the Eastern District of California. He served as chief judge from 2008 to 2012. He took senior status on October 31, 2012.

== Awards and recognition ==
In 2013, Ishii received the President's Award from the Asian/Pacific Bar Association of Sacramento.

== See also ==
- List of Asian American jurists

== Sources ==
Legal offices
Preceded by Robert Everett Coyle	Judge of the United States District Court for the Eastern District of California; 1997–2012	Succeeded by Dale A. Drozd
Preceded by Garland Ellis Burrell Jr.	Chief Judge of the United States District Court for the Eastern District of California; 2008–2012	Succeeded by Morrison C. England Jr.
