= Dena M. Coggins =

American judge (born 1979)

Dena Michaela Coggins
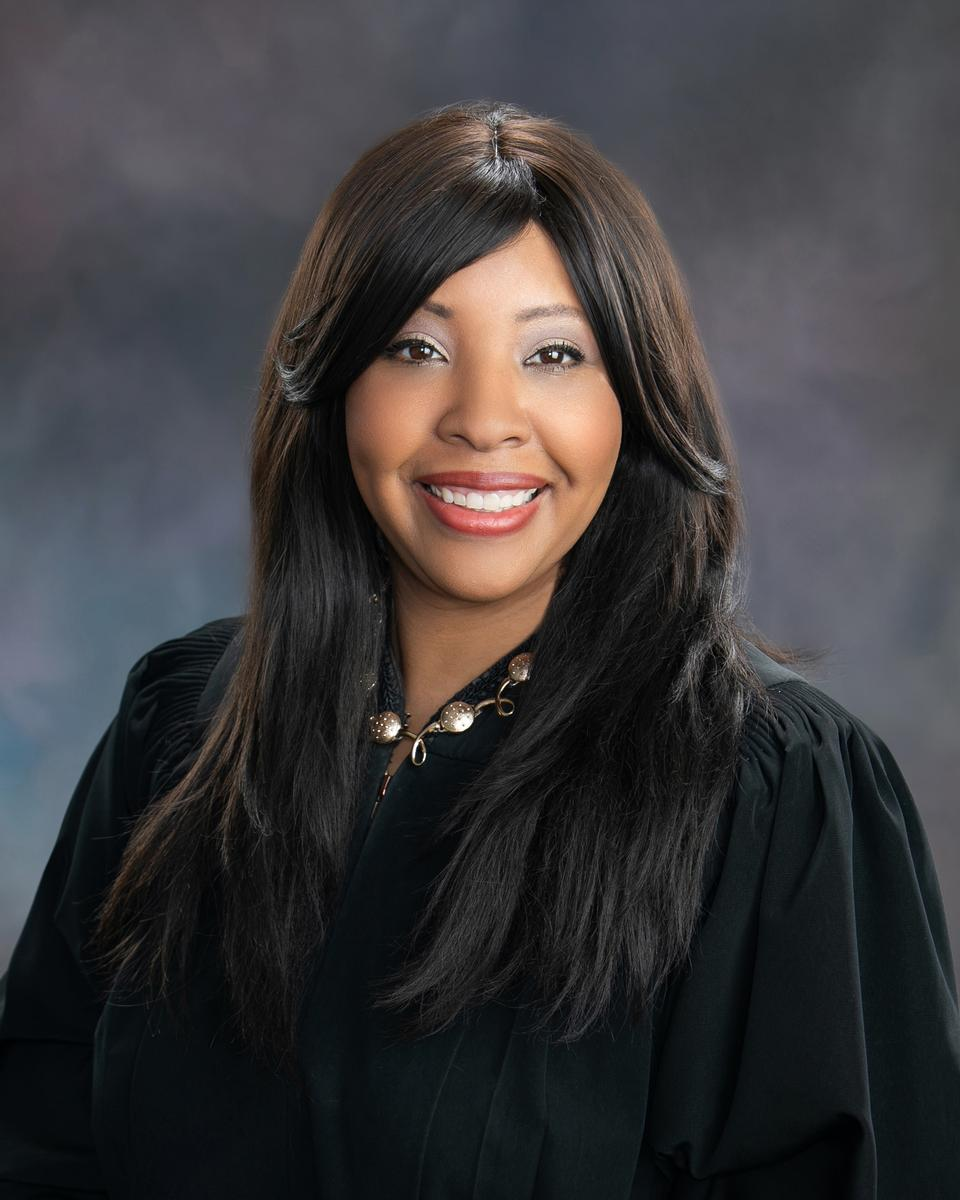

Judge of the United States District Court for the Eastern District of California
- Incumbent
- Assumed office September 18, 2024
- Appointed by: Joe Biden
- Preceded by: Kimberly J. Mueller

Judge of the Sacramento County Superior Court
- In office April 23, 2021 – September 18, 2024
- Appointed by: Gavin Newsom
- Preceded by: David W. Abbott
- Succeeded by: Martin Tejeda

Personal details
- Born: Dena Michaela Hackett; 1979 (age 46–47) Sacramento, California, U.S.
- Party: Democratic
- Education: California State University, Sacramento (BS); University of the Pacific (JD)

Dena Michaela Coggins (née Hackett; born 1979) is an American lawyer who has served as a United States district judge of the United States District Court for the Eastern District of California since 2024. She previously served as a judge of the Sacramento County Superior Court from 2021 to 2024.

== Education ==
Coggins received a Bachelor of Science from California State University, Sacramento in 2003 and a Juris Doctor from the McGeorge School of Law in 2006.

== Career ==
From 2007 to 2012, she was an associate at Morrison & Foerster and also an associate at Downey Brand L.L.P. from 2012 to 2013. From 2013 to 2015 she served as a deputy legal affairs secretary for the Governor of California. Coggins was previously an administrative law judge with California's Office of Administrative Hearings, in the special education division from 2015 to 2017 and the general jurisdiction division from 2018 to 2021. From 2021 to 2024, she served as a judge of the Sacramento County Superior Court and as presiding judge of the Juvenile Court from 2023 to 2024.

=== Federal judicial service ===
On February 7, 2024, President Joe Biden announced his intent to nominate Coggins to serve as a United States district judge of the United States District Court for the Eastern District of California. On February 8, 2024, her nomination was sent to the Senate. President Biden nominated Coggins to the seat being vacated by Judge Kimberly J. Mueller, who subsequently assumed senior status on September 17, 2024. On March 6, 2024, a hearing on her nomination was held before the Senate Judiciary Committee. During her confirmation hearing, she was questioned by Senator John Kennedy about her work as a deputy legal affairs secretary to former Governor Jerry Brown. On April 11, 2024, her nomination was reported out of committee by a 12–9 vote. On May 22, 2024, the United States Senate invoked cloture on her nomination by a 50–44 vote. Later that day, her nomination was confirmed by a 50–44 vote. She received her judicial commission on September 18, 2024. She is the first Black woman to ever serve on the Eastern District of California.

== See also ==
- List of African American federal judges
- List of African American jurists
- List of Asian American jurists

Legal offices
Preceded by Kimberly J. Mueller	Judge of the United States District Court for the Eastern District of California; 2024–present	Incumbent
