= Edward J. Garcia =

American judge (1928–2023)

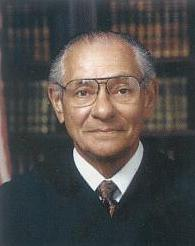

Senior Judge of the United States District Court for the Eastern District of California
- In office November 24, 1996 – April 29, 2023

Judge of the United States District Court for the Eastern District of California
- In office March 14, 1984 – November 24, 1996
- Appointed by: Ronald Reagan
- Preceded by: Philip Charles Wilkins
- Succeeded by: Frank C. Damrell Jr.

Judge of the Sacramento Municipal Court
- In office March 10, 1972 – March 1984

Personal details
- Born: Edward John Garcia; November 24, 1928 Sacramento, California, U.S.
- Died: April 29, 2023 (aged 94)
- Spouse: Dorothy Gernhardt
- Education: Sacramento City College (A.A.); McGeorge School of Law (LL.B.)

Military service
- Branch/service: United States Air Force
- Years of service: 1946–1949

Edward John Garcia (November 24, 1928 – April 29, 2023) was a United States district judge of the United States District Court for the Eastern District of California.

== Education and career ==
Garcia was born on November 24, 1928, in Sacramento, California. Garcia was in the United States Army Air Forces in the aftermath of World War II, from 1946 to 1949. He received an Associate of Arts degree from Sacramento City College in 1951 and a Bachelor of Laws from McGeorge School of Law at the University of the Pacific in 1958. He was a deputy district attorney of Sacramento County, California from 1959 to 1972, serving as a supervisor in that office from 1964 to 1969, and chief of that office from 1969 to 1972. He was a judge on the Sacramento Municipal Court, California from 1972 to 1984.

== Federal judicial service ==
On February 16, 1984, Garcia was nominated by President Ronald Reagan to a seat on the United States District Court for the Eastern District of California vacated by Judge Philip Charles Wilkins. Garcia was confirmed by the United States Senate on March 13, 1984, and received his commission on March 14, 1984. He assumed senior status on November 24, 1996. He retired into inactive senior status on November 30, 2012.

== See also ==
- List of Hispanic and Latino American jurists

== Sources ==
Legal offices
Preceded by Philip Charles Wilkins	Judge of the United States District Court for the Eastern District of California; 1984–1996	Succeeded by Frank C. Damrell Jr.
