= Garland E. Burrell Jr. =

American judge (born 1947)

Garland Ellis Burrell Jr.
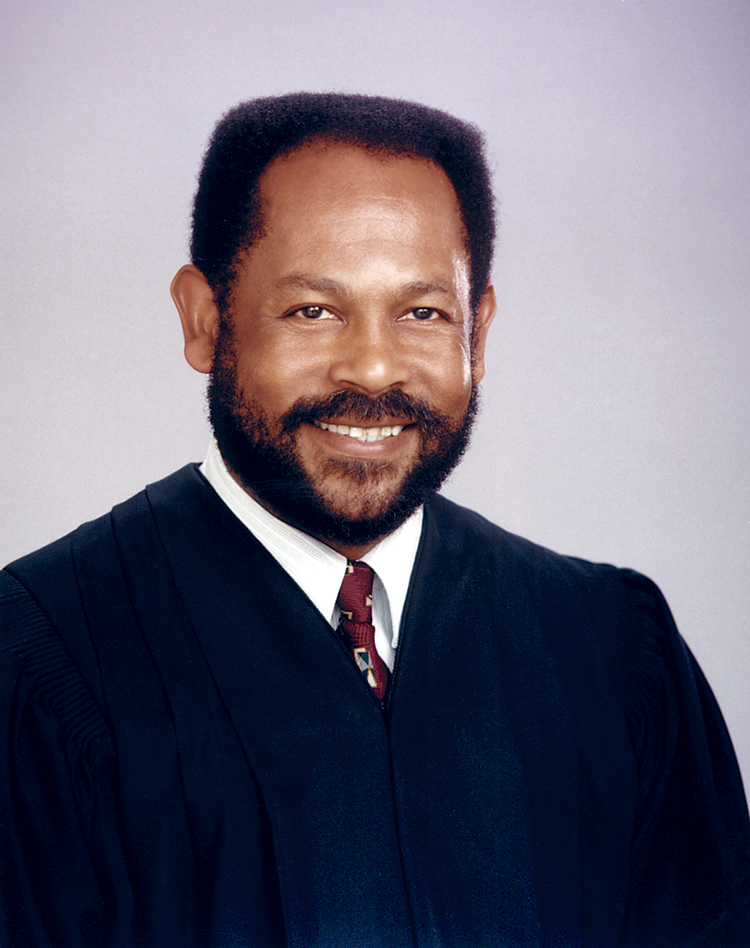

Senior Judge of the United States District Court for the Eastern District of California
- Incumbent
- Assumed office July 4, 2012

Chief Judge of the United States District Court for the Eastern District of California
- In office 2007–2008
- Preceded by: David F. Levi
- Succeeded by: Anthony W. Ishii

Judge of the United States District Court for the Eastern District of California
- In office March 2, 1992 – July 4, 2012
- Appointed by: George H. W. Bush
- Preceded by: Seat established by 104 Stat. 5089
- Succeeded by: Troy L. Nunley

Personal details
- Born: Garland Ellis Burrell Jr. July 4, 1947 (age 78) Los Angeles, California, U.S.
- Spouse: Karen S. Kerchner
- Education: California State University, Los Angeles (BA); California Western School of Law (JD); Washington University in St. Louis (MSW)

Military service
- Allegiance: United States
- Branch/service: United States Marine Corps
- Years of service: 1966–1968
- Rank: Corporal
- Battles/wars: Vietnam War

Garland Ellis Burrell Jr. (born July 4, 1947) is an inactive senior United States district judge of the United States District Court for the Eastern District of California.

== Biography ==
Born in Los Angeles, California, Burrell was in the United States Marine Corps during the Vietnam War, from 1966 to 1968. He received a Bachelor of Arts degree from California State University, Los Angeles, in 1972, a Master of Social Work from the George Warren Brown School of Social Work at Washington University in St. Louis in 1976, and a Juris Doctor from California Western School of Law in San Diego in 1976.

In 1972, he was the manager of a liquor store based in Los Angeles, California. From 1974 to 1976 he served as a law clerk for three different organizations and law firms before becoming a legal intern with the San Diego District Attorney's Office in 1976.

He was a deputy district attorney of Sacramento, California from 1976 to 1978, and then a deputy city attorney for that city from 1978 to 1979. He was a deputy chief of the Civil Division of the United States Attorney's Office for the Eastern District of California from 1979 to 1985. He was a business litigator, Stockman Law Corporation from 1985 to 1986. He was a senior deputy attorney of Sacramento from 1986 to 1990, and then returned to the United States Attorney's Office as chief of the Civil Division until 1992.

=== Federal judicial service ===
On August 1, 1991, Burrell was nominated by President George H. W. Bush to a new seat on the United States District Court for the Eastern District of California created by 104 Stat. 5089. He was confirmed by the United States Senate on February 27, 1992, and received his commission on March 2, 1992. He served as chief judge of the district from 2007 to 2008.

Burrell assumed senior status effective July 4, 2012. He assumed inactive senior status on December 31, 2019.

== See also ==
- List of African-American federal judges
- List of African-American jurists

== Sources ==
Legal offices
Preceded by Seat established by 104 Stat. 5089	Judge of the United States District Court for the Eastern District of California; 1992–2012	Succeeded by Troy L. Nunley
Preceded by David F. Levi	Chief Judge of the United States District Court for the Eastern District of California; 2007–2008	Succeeded by Anthony W. Ishii
