= Milton Lewis Schwartz =

American judge

Senior Judge of the United States District Court for the Eastern District of California
- In office January 20, 1990 – October 3, 2005

Judge of the United States District Court for the Eastern District of California
- In office November 27, 1979 – January 20, 1990
- Appointed by: Jimmy Carter
- Preceded by: Seat established by 92 Stat. 1629
- Succeeded by: Oliver Winston Wanger

Personal details
- Born: Milton Lewis Schwartz; January 20, 1920 Oakland, California
- Died: October 3, 2005 (aged 85) Sacramento, California
- Education: University of California, Berkeley (AB); UC Berkeley School of Law (JD)

Milton Lewis Schwartz (January 20, 1920 – October 3, 2005) was a United States district judge of the United States District Court for the Eastern District of California.

== Education and career ==
Born in Oakland, California, Schwartz received an Artium Baccalaureus degree from the University of California, Berkeley in 1941 and was a Major in the United States Army from 1942 to 1945. He received a Juris Doctor from the UC Berkeley School of Law in 1948 and was a law clerk to Judge Rolfe L. Thompson of the California Court of Appeal from 1948 to 1949. He was a deputy district attorney of Sacramento County, California from 1949 to 1951, and was then in private practice in Sacramento, California from 1951 to 1979.

== Federal judicial service ==
On September 28, 1979, Schwartz was nominated by President Jimmy Carter to a new seat on the United States District Court for the Eastern District of California created by 92 Stat. 1629. He was confirmed by the United States Senate on November 26, 1979, and received his commission on November 27, 1979. He assumed senior status on January 20, 1990, serving in that capacity until his death on October 3, 2005, in Sacramento.

== Sources ==
Legal offices
Preceded by Seat established by 92 Stat. 1629	Judge of the United States District Court for the Eastern District of California; 1979–1990	Succeeded by Oliver Winston Wanger
