= Gilbert H. Jertberg =

American judge (1897–1973)

Senior Judge of the United States Court of Appeals for the Ninth Circuit
- In office September 30, 1967 – June 8, 1973

Judge of the United States Court of Appeals for the Ninth Circuit
- In office August 21, 1958 – September 30, 1967
- Appointed by: Dwight D. Eisenhower
- Preceded by: Dal Millington Lemmon
- Succeeded by: James Marshall Carter

Judge of the United States District Court for the Southern District of California
- In office March 16, 1955 – September 1, 1958
- Appointed by: Dwight D. Eisenhower
- Preceded by: Campbell E. Beaumont
- Succeeded by: Myron Donovan Crocker

Personal details
- Born: Gilbert H. Jertberg; February 1, 1897 Springfield, Missouri, U.S.
- Died: June 8, 1973 (aged 76) Fresno, California, U.S.
- Education: Stanford University (BA, JD)

Gilbert H. Jertberg (February 1, 1897 – June 8, 1973) was a United States circuit judge of the United States Court of Appeals for the Ninth Circuit and previously was a United States district judge of the United States District Court for the Southern District of California.

== Education and career ==
Born in Springfield, Missouri, Jertberg was a lieutenant in the United States Army during World War I, from 1917 to 1918. He received an Artium Baccalaureus degree from Stanford University in 1920 and a Juris Doctor from Stanford Law School in 1922. He was a deputy district attorney of Fresno County, California from 1923 to 1924. He was in private practice in Fresno, California from 1924 to 1955.

== Education and career ==
Jertberg was nominated by President Dwight D. Eisenhower on January 21, 1955, to a seat on the United States District Court for the Southern District of California vacated by Judge Campbell E. Beaumont. He was confirmed by the United States Senate on March 14, 1955, and received his commission on March 16, 1955. His service terminated on September 1, 1958, due to his elevation to the Ninth Circuit.

Jertberg was nominated by President Eisenhower on August 16, 1958, to a seat on the United States Court of Appeals for the Ninth Circuit vacated by Judge Dal Millington Lemmon. He was confirmed by the Senate on August 19, 1958, and received commission on August 21, 1958. He assumed senior status on September 30, 1967. His service terminated on June 8, 1973, due to his death in Fresno.

== Sources ==
Legal offices
Preceded by Campbell E. Beaumont	Judge of the United States District Court for the Southern District of California; 1955–1958	Succeeded by Myron Donovan Crocker
Preceded by Dal Millington Lemmon	Judge of the United States Court of Appeals for the Ninth Circuit; 1958–1967	Succeeded by James Marshall Carter
