= Jennifer L. Thurston =

American judge (born 1967)

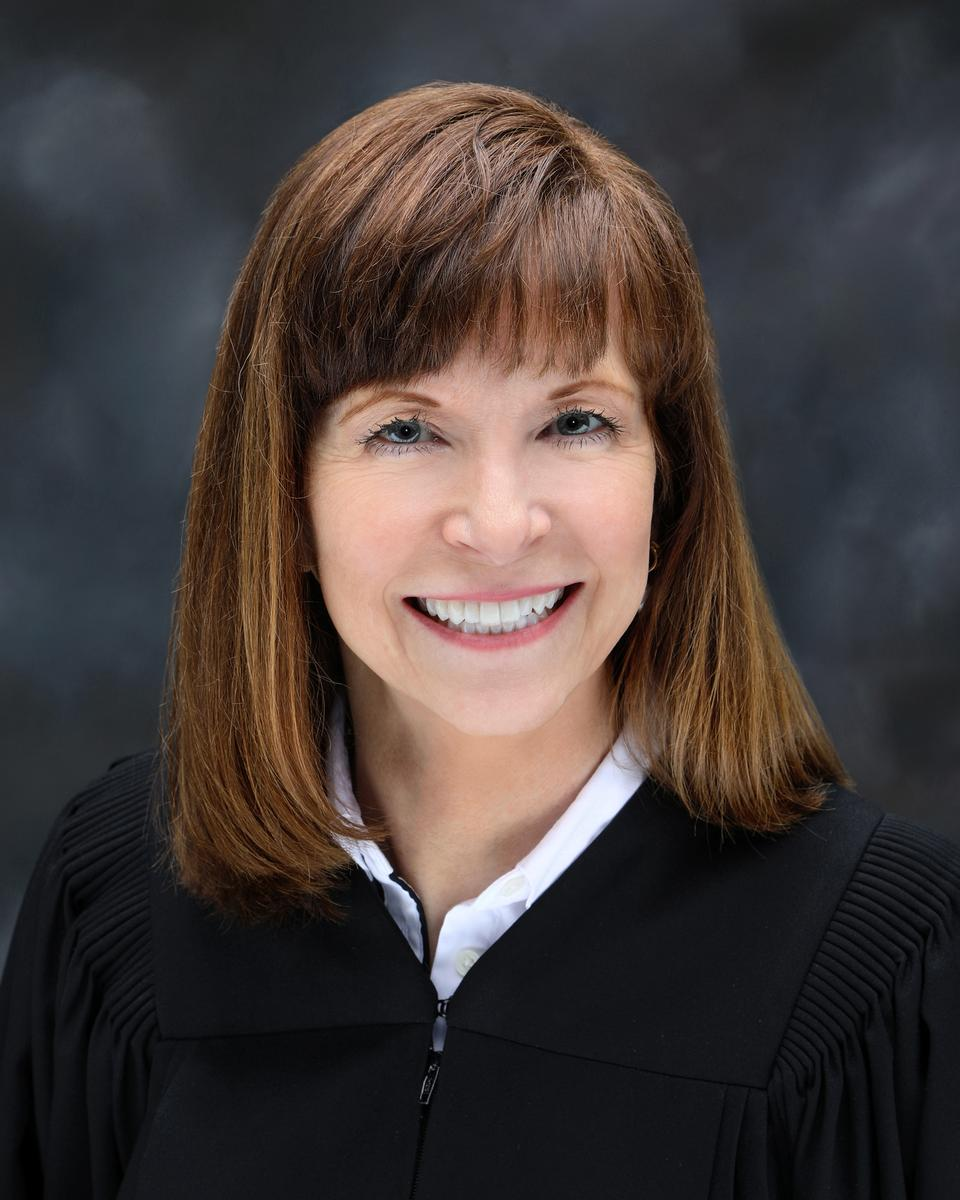

Judge of the United States District Court for the Eastern District of California
- Incumbent
- Assumed office December 27, 2021
- Appointed by: Joe Biden
- Preceded by: Lawrence Joseph O'Neill

Chief Magistrate Judge of the United States District Court for the Eastern District of California
- In office October 2020 – December 27, 2021

Magistrate Judge of the United States District Court for the Eastern District of California
- In office December 31, 2009 – December 27, 2021

Personal details
- Born: Jennifer Leigh Calderwood; 1967 (age 58–59) Bakersfield, California, U.S.
- Education: California State University, Bakersfield (BS); California Pacific University (JD); Duke University (LLM)

Jennifer Leigh Thurston (née Calderwood; born 1967) is an American lawyer who serves as a United States district judge of the United States District Court for the Eastern District of California. She previously served as the chief United States magistrate judge of the same court.

== Early life and education ==
Thurston was born in 1967 in Bakersfield, California. She received a Bachelor of Science from California State University, Bakersfield in 1989 and a Juris Doctor from the California Pacific School of Law in 1997 and her Master of Laws from Duke University in 2018.

== Career ==
From 1997 to 2009, she served as deputy county counsel for the office of county counsel in Bakersfield.

=== Federal judicial service ===
Thurston served as a U.S. magistrate judge of the Eastern District of California from December 31, 2009, to December 27, 2021. She was chief U.S. magistrate judge for the district from October 2020 to December 2021.

On September 8, 2021, President Joe Biden announced his intent to nominate Thurston to serve as a United States district judge of the United States District Court for the Eastern District of California. On September 20, 2021, her nomination was sent to the Senate. President Biden nominated Thurston to the seat vacated by Judge Lawrence Joseph O'Neill, who assumed senior status on February 2, 2020. On October 20, 2021, a hearing on her nomination was held before the Senate Judiciary Committee. On December 2, 2021, her nomination was reported out of committee by a 13–9 vote. On December 17, 2021, the United States Senate invoked cloture on her nomination by a 46–24 vote. That same day, her nomination was confirmed by a 46–24 vote. She received her judicial commission on December 27, 2021.

Legal offices
Preceded by Lawrence Joseph O'Neill	Judge of the United States District Court for the Eastern District of California; 2021–present	Incumbent
