= Oliver Winston Wanger =

American judge (born 1940)

Senior Judge of the United States District Court for the Eastern District of California
- In office May 31, 2006 – October 1, 2011

Judge of the United States District Court for the Eastern District of California
- In office March 25, 1991 – May 31, 2006
- Appointed by: George H. W. Bush
- Preceded by: Milton Lewis Schwartz
- Succeeded by: Lawrence Joseph O'Neill

Personal details
- Born: Oliver Winston Wanger; November 27, 1940 (age 85) Los Angeles, California
- Education: University of Southern California (BS); UC Berkeley School of Law (LLB)

Oliver Winston Wanger (born November 27, 1940) is a former United States district judge of the United States District Court for the Eastern District of California.

== Education and early career ==
Born in Los Angeles, California, Wanger received a Bachelor of Science degree from the University of Southern California in 1963. From 1960 to 1967 he was a United States Marine Corps Reserve Sergeant. Wanger completed a Bachelor of Laws from the University of California, Berkeley, School of Law in 1966. He served as a deputy district attorney of Fresno County from 1967 to 1969, and an adjunct professor at Humphreys College Laurence Drivon School of Law from 1968 to 1969.

== San Joaquin College of Law ==
In 1969, Wanger joined Fresno County Municipal Court Judge Dan Eymann and attorney John Loomis to found San Joaquin College of Law (SJCL) in Fresno, California. Wanger served as an adjunct professor at SJCL from 1970 to 1991 and served as Dean from 1980 to 1983.

== Legal career ==
Wanger was City Attorney for Mendota, California from 1975 to 1980. He was a Judge Pro Tem, Superior Court of California, County of Fresno in 1988. He was a Pro tem settlement conference judge, Superior Court of California, County of Fresno in 1989.

He was a United States District Judge of the United States District Court for the Eastern District of California. Wanger was nominated by President George H. W. Bush on January 8, 1991, to a seat vacated by Judge Milton Lewis Schwartz. He was confirmed by the United States Senate on March 21, 1991, and received his commission on March 25, 1991. He assumed senior status on May 31, 2006.

Sitting in Fresno, Judge Wanger became known as the chief arbiter of California's water wars. The highly technical scientific disputes Wanger was forced to resolve would require him to rely on his own appointed expert witnesses and often to issue rulings that were hundreds of pages long. During the bitterly contested delta smelt case, Judge Wanger drew national attention when he lengthily ridiculed a testifying government scientist for being a "zealot". In September 2011 he announced that he would retire on September 30, 2011. When stepping off the bench Judge Wanger observed that his time of service had left him with few friends.

Legal offices
Preceded by Milton Lewis Schwartz	Judge of the United States District Court for the Eastern District of California; 1991–2006	Succeeded by Lawrence Joseph O'Neill
