= Troy Nunley =

American federal judge (born 1964)

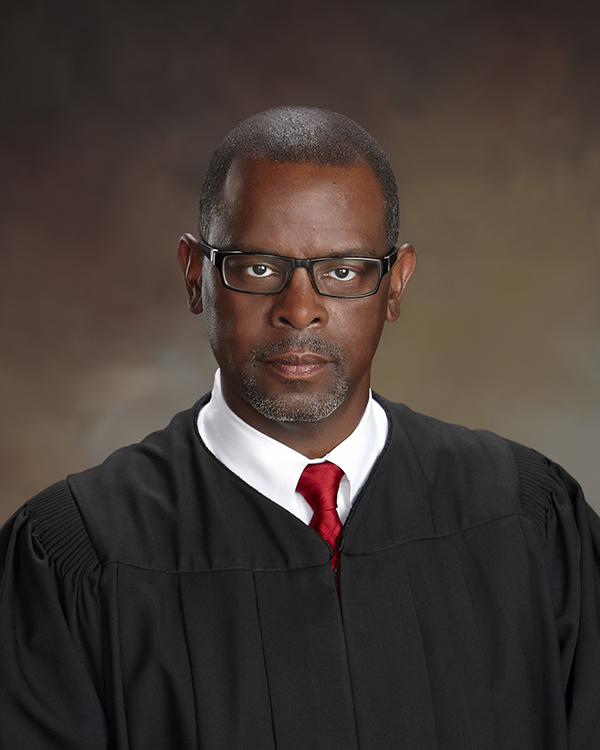

Chief Judge of the United States District Court for the Eastern District of California
- Incumbent
- Assumed office September 17, 2024
- Preceded by: Kimberly J. Mueller

Judge of the United States District Court for the Eastern District of California
- Incumbent
- Assumed office March 26, 2013
- Appointed by: Barack Obama
- Preceded by: Garland E. Burrell Jr.

Personal details
- Born: Troy Lynne Nunley; 1964 (age 61–62) San Francisco, California, U.S.
- Education: Saint Mary's College of California (BA); University of California, Hastings (JD)

Troy Lynne Nunley (born 1964) is an American lawyer and jurist serving as the chief judge of the United States District Court for the Eastern District of California.

== Early life and education ==
Born in 1964 in San Francisco, California, Nunley received his Bachelor of Arts degree in 1986 from St. Mary's College of California. He received his Juris Doctor in 1990 from the University of California, Hastings College of the Law (now University of California College of the Law, San Francisco).

== Career ==
Nunley served as a deputy district attorney in Alameda County from 1991 to 1994 and in Sacramento County from 1996 to 1999. He served in private practice as a sole practitioner from 1994 to 1996. He served as a deputy attorney general in the California Attorney General's office from 1999 to 2002. From 2002 to 2013, he served as a judge on the Sacramento County Superior Court. Nunley has served as a professor of Business Organizations at Lincoln Law School since 2006.

=== Federal judicial service ===
On June 25, 2012, President Barack Obama nominated Nunley to be a United States district judge of the United States District Court for the Eastern District of California, to the seat vacated by Judge Garland E. Burrell Jr. who assumed senior status on July 4, 2012. On September 19, 2012, the Senate Judiciary Committee held a hearing on his nomination and reported his nomination to the floor on December 6, 2012, by voice vote. On January 2, 2013, his nomination was returned to the President, due to the sine die adjournment of the Senate. On January 3, 2013, he was renominated to the same office. His nomination was reported by the Senate Judiciary Committee on February 14, 2013, by voice vote. He was confirmed by voice vote on the legislative day of March 22, 2013. He received his commission on March 26, 2013. He became the chief judge on September 17, 2024.

== See also ==
- List of African-American federal judges
- List of African-American jurists

Legal offices
Preceded by Garland E. Burrell Jr.	Judge of the United States District Court for the Eastern District of California; 2013–present	Incumbent
Preceded by Kimberly J. Mueller	Chief Judge of the United States District Court for the Eastern District of California; 2024–present	Incumbent
