= Lawrence K. Karlton =

American judge (1935–2015)

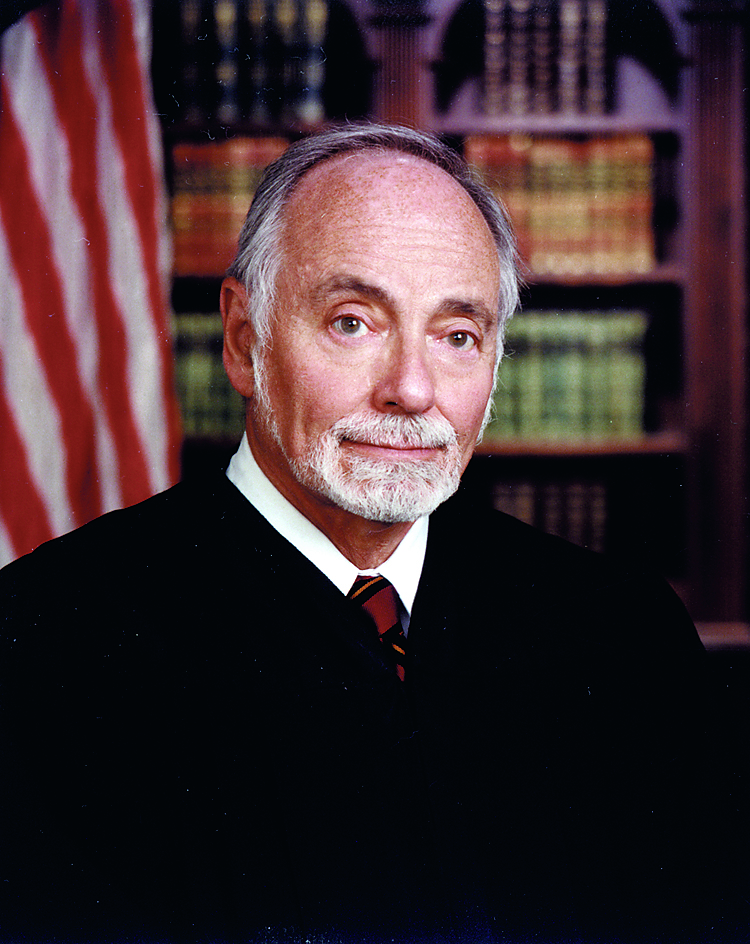

Senior Judge of the United States District Court for the Eastern District of California
- In office May 28, 2000 – July 11, 2015

Chief Judge of the United States District Court for the Eastern District of California
- In office 1983–1990
- Preceded by: Philip Charles Wilkins
- Succeeded by: Robert Everett Coyle

Judge of the United States District Court for the Eastern District of California
- In office July 24, 1979 – May 28, 2000
- Appointed by: Jimmy Carter
- Preceded by: Thomas Jamison MacBride
- Succeeded by: Morrison C. England Jr.

Personal details
- Born: Lawrence K. Karlton; May 28, 1935 Brooklyn, New York, U.S.
- Died: July 11, 2015 (aged 80) Sacramento, California, U.S.
- Education: Columbia Law School (JD)

Lawrence K. Karlton (May 28, 1935 – July 11, 2015) was a United States district judge of the United States District Court for the Eastern District of California in Sacramento, California.

== Education and career ==
Born in Brooklyn, New York in 1935, Karlton received a Juris Doctor from Columbia Law School in 1958, at the age of 23. He was in the United States Army from 1958 to 1960 as a private (E-2), and was a Civilian legal officer at the Sacramento Army Depot from 1960 to 1962. He was in private practice in Sacramento, California from 1962 to 1976, and also litigated civil liberties cases as a volunteer lawyer for the American Civil Liberties Union. He was appointed by California Governor Jerry Brown as a judge of the Superior Court of California, where he served from 1976 to 1979.

== Federal judicial service ==
On June 5, 1979, President Jimmy Carter nominated Karlton to a seat vacated by Judge Thomas Jamison MacBride on the United States District Court for the Eastern District of California. He was confirmed by the United States Senate on July 23, 1979, and received his commission on July 24, 1979. He served as Chief Judge from 1983 to 1990, and as Chief Judge Emeritus until assuming senior status on May 28, 2000, serving in that status until his death.

== Notable cases ==
Karlton, along with Judges Stephen Reinhardt and Thelton Henderson, was a member of a special three-judge panel overseeing overcrowding in the California prison system. On April 5, 2013, Judge Karlton ruled in a 68-page decision against Governor Brown that, "this court finds that ongoing constitutional violations remain in this action and the prospective relief ordered by this court remains necessary to remedy those violations."

On June 20, 2013, Judge Karlton, along with Reinhardt and Henderson, ordered Governor Brown to expand inmates "good-time credits" which would permit inmates to finish their prison sentences prematurely. They demanded that action be taken immediately, and that any laws that might prevent the early release of the inmates be ignored.

== Retirement and death ==
During his criminal calendar on February 25, 2014, Judge Karlton announced that he would stop hearing cases at the end of August 2014. He died on July 11, 2015, in Sacramento.

== See also ==
- List of Jewish American jurists

== Sources ==
Legal offices
Preceded by Thomas Jamison MacBride	Judge of the United States District Court for the Eastern District of California; 1979–2000	Succeeded by Morrison C. England Jr.
Preceded by Philip Charles Wilkins	Chief Judge of the United States District Court for the Eastern District of California; 1983–1990	Succeeded by Robert Everett Coyle
