= Robert E. Coyle United States Courthouse =

Courthouse in Fresno, California

Robert E. Coyle Federal Building and United States Courthouse
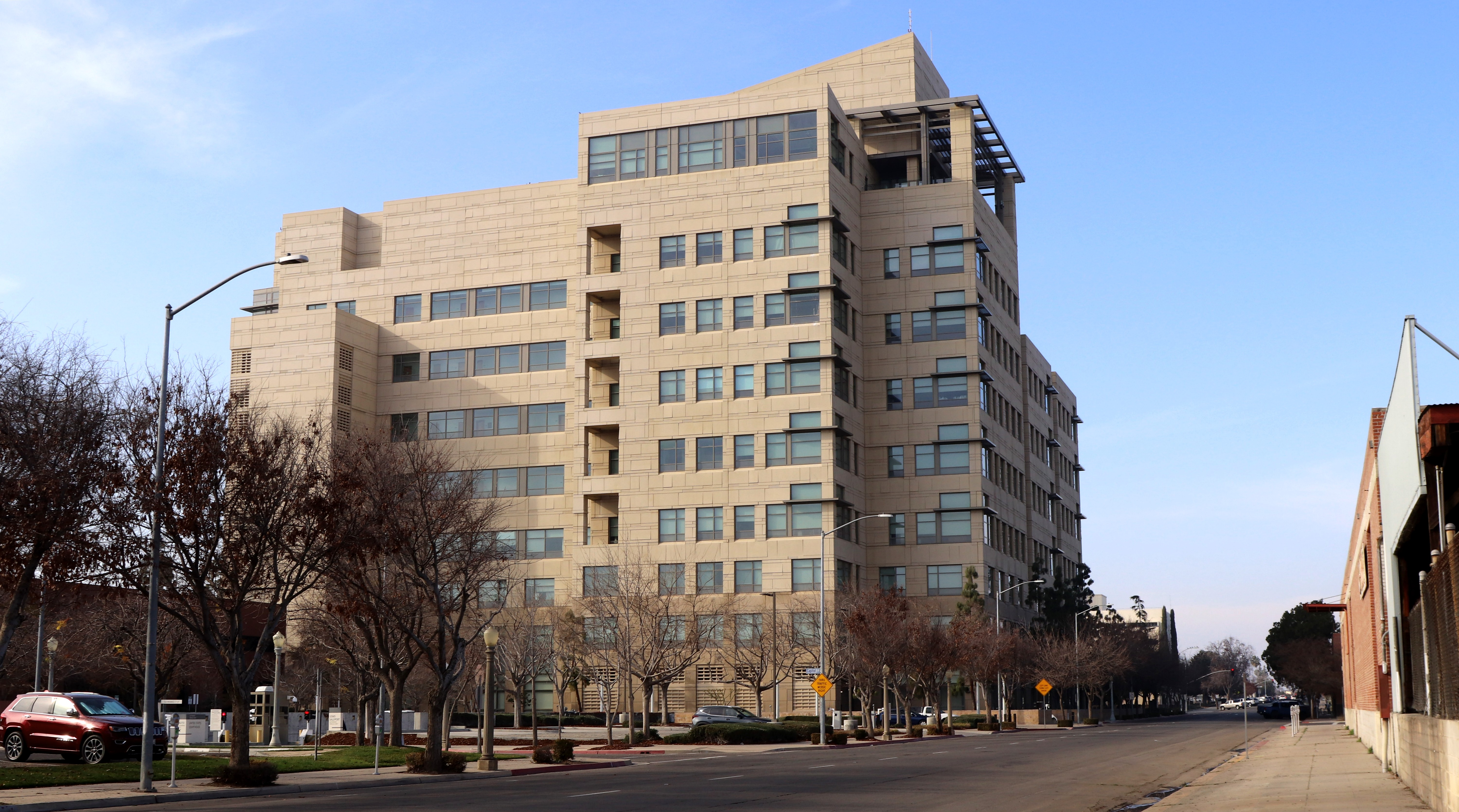
- Interactive map of the Robert E. Coyle Federal Building and United States Courthouse area
- Alternative names: Fresno United States Courthouse

General information
- Type: Courthouse
- Architectural style: Brutalist
- Location: 2500 Tulare Street; Fresno, California
- Coordinates: 36.7377°N 119.7838°W
- Construction started: 2002
- Completed: October 2005
- Cost: US$127 million
- Owner: United States federal government (General Services Administration)

Height
- Roof: 226 ft (69 m)

Technical details
- Floor count: 9
- Floor area: 496,000 sq ft (46,100 m^{2})

Design and construction
- Architects: Moore Ruble Yudell Architects and Planners (design); Gruen and Associates (executive); Pamela Burton & Company (landscape)
- Main contractor: Clark Pacific
- Awards and prizes: American Architecture Award

The Robert E. Coyle Federal Building and United States Courthouse is a 9-story, 226-foot-tall (69 m) high-rise completed in 2005 in downtown Fresno, California. The building is named after U.S. District Judge Robert Everett Coyle (1930–2012), and it is one of the tallest buildings in Downtown Fresno and Central California.
