= Philip Charles Wilkins =

American judge (1913–1998)

Senior Judge of the United States District Court for the Eastern District of California
- In office January 27, 1983 – July 8, 1998

Chief Judge of the United States District Court for the Eastern District of California
- In office 1979–1983
- Preceded by: Thomas Jamison MacBride
- Succeeded by: Lawrence K. Karlton

Judge of the United States District Court for the Eastern District of California
- In office December 18, 1969 – January 27, 1983
- Appointed by: Richard Nixon
- Preceded by: Sherrill Halbert
- Succeeded by: Edward J. Garcia

Personal details
- Born: Philip Charles Wilkins; January 27, 1913 Sacramento, California, U.S.
- Died: July 8, 1998 (aged 85) Sacramento, California, U.S.
- Education: University of California, Hastings; College of the Law (LL.B.)

Philip Charles Wilkins (January 27, 1913 – July 8, 1998) was a United States district judge of the United States District Court for the Eastern District of California.

== Education and career ==
Born in Sacramento, California, Wilkins received a Bachelor of Laws from the University of California, Hastings College of the Law in 1939. He was in private practice in Sacramento from 1940 to 1942. He was a United States Naval Reserve Lieutenant during World War II, from 1942 to 1945. He was in private practice in Sacramento from 1946 to 1969.

== Federal judicial service ==
Wilkins was nominated by President Richard Nixon on October 23, 1969, to a seat on the United States District Court for the Eastern District of California vacated by Judge Sherrill Halbert. He was confirmed by the United States Senate on December 17, 1969, and received his commission on December 18, 1969. He served as Chief Judge from 1979 to 1983. He assumed senior status on January 27, 1983. Wilkins served in that capacity until his death on July 8, 1998, in Sacramento.

== Sources ==
Legal offices
Preceded by Sherrill Halbert	Judge of the United States District Court for the Eastern District of California; 1969–1983	Succeeded by Edward J. Garcia
Preceded by Thomas Jamison MacBride	Chief Judge of the United States District Court for the Eastern District of California; 1979–1983	Succeeded by Lawrence K. Karlton
