= Raul Anthony Ramirez =

American judge

Judge of the United States District Court for the Eastern District of California
- In office May 23, 1980 – December 31, 1989
- Appointed by: Jimmy Carter
- Preceded by: Seat established by 92 Stat. 1629
- Succeeded by: William B. Shubb

Judge of the Sacramento Municipal Court
- In office 1977–1980

Personal details
- Born: Raul Anthony Ramirez; March 8, 1944 (age 82) Los Angeles, California
- Spouse: Sharon A. B. Balonek
- Children: 1
- Education: Glendale Junior College (AA); Los Angeles State College (BA); University of the Pacific (JD)

Raul Anthony Ramirez (born March 8, 1944) is a former United States district judge of the United States District Court for the Eastern District of California and is currently an attorney in private practice serving as an arbitrator and mediator.

== Education and career ==
Born in Los Angeles, California, Ramirez received an Associate of Arts degree from Glendale Junior College in 1965, a Bachelor of Arts degree from Los Angeles State College (now California State University, Los Angeles) in 1967 and a Juris Doctor from the McGeorge School of Law at the University of the Pacific in 1970. He was a law clerk for Judge William Gallagher of the Sacramento County Superior Court in California, from 1970 to 1971. He was in private practice in Sacramento, California from 1971 to 1977, and was then a judge of the Sacramento Municipal Court from 1977 to 1980.

== Federal judicial service ==
On December 14, 1979, Ramirez was nominated by President Jimmy Carter to a new seat on the United States District Court for the Eastern District of California created by 92 Stat. 1629. He was confirmed by the United States Senate on May 21, 1980, and received his commission on May 23, 1980. Ramirez served in that capacity until his resignation on December 31, 1989. Ramirez cited low morale among the Judges caused by overwork and low pay in his decision to resign.

== Post judicial service ==
Since his resignation from the federal bench, Ramirez has engaged in the private practice of law as an arbitrator and mediator. From 1990 to 1996, he served as a Senior Litigation Partner with the law firm of Orrick, Herrington & Sutcliffe, concentrating in alternative dispute resolution. In 1996, he established his own firm Ramirez Arbitration & Mediation Services, where he serves as an arbitrator and mediator. He remains active as of June 2018.

== See also ==
- List of Hispanic and Latino American jurists

== Sources ==
- Selection and confirmation of federal judges hearing before the Committee on the Judiciary, United States Senate, Ninety-sixth Congress, first session .... pt.6 (1979)

Legal offices
Preceded by Seat established by 92 Stat. 1629	Judge of the United States District Court for the Eastern District of California; 1980–1989	Succeeded by William B. Shubb
