= Frank C. Damrell Jr. =

American judge (born 1938)

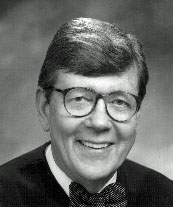

Senior Judge of the United States District Court for the Eastern District of California
- In office December 31, 2008 – December 1, 2011

Judge of the United States District Court for the Eastern District of California
- In office November 12, 1997 – December 31, 2008
- Appointed by: Bill Clinton
- Preceded by: Edward J. Garcia
- Succeeded by: Kimberly J. Mueller

Personal details
- Born: July 6, 1938 (age 87) Modesto, California, U.S.
- Education: University of California, Berkeley (BA); Yale University (LLB)

Frank Cadmus Damrell Jr. (born July 6, 1938) is a former United States district judge of the United States District Court for the Eastern District of California. He is also a Trustee of the University of California, Merced. In CAPEEM v. Noonan, he extended the right of educational entities to use the n-word with immunity from challenges under the Equal Protection Clause to school textbooks adopted by the State Board of Education, a right that had been granted to the Board of Education for use in literary works due to the ruling in Monteiro v. Tempe Union.

== Early life and education ==
Born in Modesto, California, Damrell received a Bachelor of Arts degree from the University of California, Berkeley in 1961 and a Bachelor of Laws from Yale Law School in 1964.

== Career ==
Damrell was a deputy in the Office of the State Attorney General of California from 1964 to 1966. He was a deputy district attorney of Office of the District Attorney, California from 1966 to 1968. He was in private practice in Modesto from 1968 to 1997.

== Federal judicial service ==
Damrell is a former United States District Judge of the United States District Court for the Eastern District of California. Damrell was nominated by President Bill Clinton on July 24, 1997, to a seat vacated by Edward J. Garcia. He was confirmed by the United States Senate on November 9, 1997, and received his commission on November 12, 1997. When he was appointed to the court, his connections to the Gallo family generated controversy. He assumed senior status on December 31, 2008. He retired on December 1, 2011.

== Sources ==
Legal offices
Preceded by Edward J. Garcia	Judge of the United States District Court for the Eastern District of California; 1997–2008	Succeeded by Kimberly J. Mueller
