= Sherrill Halbert =

American judge

Senior Judge of the United States District Court for the Eastern District of California
- In office September 30, 1969 – May 31, 1991

Judge of the United States District Court for the Eastern District of California
- In office September 18, 1966 – September 30, 1969
- Appointed by: operation of law
- Preceded by: Seat established by 80 Stat. 75
- Succeeded by: Philip Charles Wilkins

Judge of the United States District Court for the Northern District of California
- In office August 26, 1954 – September 18, 1966
- Appointed by: Dwight D. Eisenhower
- Preceded by: Dal Millington Lemmon
- Succeeded by: Seat abolished

Personal details
- Born: Sherrill Halbert; October 17, 1901 Terra Bella, California, U.S.
- Died: May 31, 1991 (aged 89) San Rafael, California, U.S.
- Education: University of California, Berkeley (A.B.); UC Berkeley School of Law (J.D.)

Ernest Sherrill Halbert (October 17, 1901 – May 31, 1991) was a United States district judge of the United States District Court for the Northern District of California and the United States District Court for the Eastern District of California.

== Education and career ==
Born in Terra Bella, California, Halbert received an Artium Baccalaureus degree from the University of California, Berkeley in 1924 and a Juris Doctor from the UC Berkeley School of Law in 1927. He was in private practice in Porterville, California from 1927 to 1941, also serving as chief deputy district attorney of Tulare County, California from 1927 to 1936. He was a deputy state attorney general of California in 1942, returning to private practice in San Francisco, California from 1942 to 1944, and in Modesto, California from 1944 to 1949. He was a chief deputy district attorney of Stanislaus County, California from 1944 to 1949, and district attorney of that county in 1949, until he became a Judge of the Superior Court of California, from 1949 to 1954.

== Federal judicial service ==
On August 19, 1954, Halbert was nominated by President Dwight D. Eisenhower to a seat on the United States District Court for the Northern District of California vacated by Judge Dal Millington Lemmon. Halbert was confirmed by the United States Senate on August 20, 1954, and received his commission on August 26, 1954. On September 18, 1966, he was reassigned by operation of law to the United States District Court for the Eastern District of California, to a new seat authorized by 80 Stat. 75. He assumed senior status on September 30, 1969, serving in that capacity until his death on May 31, 1991, in San Rafael, California.

== Sources ==
Legal offices
Preceded by Dal Millington Lemmon	Judge of the United States District Court for the Northern District of California; 1954–1966	Succeeded by Seat abolished
Preceded by Seat established by 80 Stat. 75	Judge of the United States District Court for the Eastern District of California; 1966–1969	Succeeded by Philip Charles Wilkins
