= Kimberly J. Mueller =

American judge (born 1957)

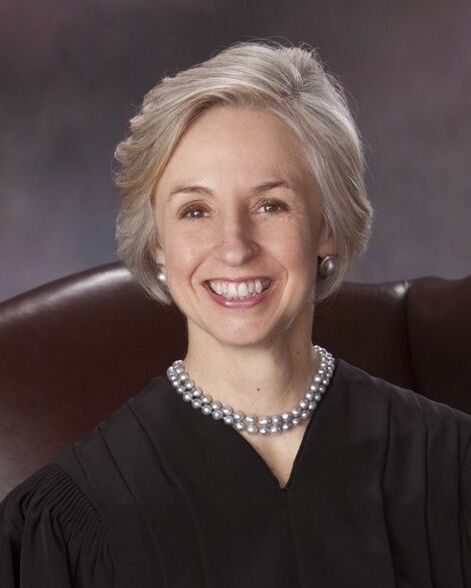

Senior Judge of the United States District Court for the Eastern District of California
- In office September 17, 2024 – January 4, 2026

Chief Judge of the United States District Court for the Eastern District of California
- In office January 1, 2020 – September 17, 2024
- Preceded by: Lawrence Joseph O'Neill
- Succeeded by: Troy L. Nunley

Judge of the United States District Court for the Eastern District of California
- In office December 21, 2010 – September 17, 2024
- Appointed by: Barack Obama
- Preceded by: Frank C. Damrell Jr.
- Succeeded by: Dena M. Coggins

Magistrate Judge of the United States District Court for the Eastern District of California
- In office 2003–2010

Member of the Sacramento City Council from the 6th district
- In office 1987–1992
- Preceded by: William Smallman
- Succeeded by: Darrell Steinberg

Personal details
- Born: September 17, 1957 (age 69) Newton, Kansas, U.S.
- Education: Pomona College (BA); Stanford University (JD)

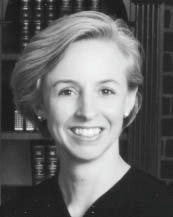
Magistrate portrait

Kimberly Jo Mueller (born September 17, 1957) is an American jurist who is a retired United States district judge of the United States District Court for the Eastern District of California. She was the first female district judge to serve in the Eastern District.

== Education ==
Mueller obtained a Bachelor of Arts degree from Pomona College in 1981, and a Juris Doctor from Stanford University in 1995.

== Career ==
=== Political career ===
Mueller served as an extern for California State Assemblyman Lloyd Connelly. After moving to Sacramento's Tahoe Park neighborhood, Mueller was elected to the Sacramento City Council, where she served from 1987 through 1992.

While on the council, Mueller was selected to serve as Vice-Mayor and chair of the city's budget committee. She also led a successful effort with then-Mayor Anne Rudin to introduce campaign finance reform to the city's politics.

=== Legal career ===
Mueller left her position on the Sacramento City Council in 1992 to attend Stanford Law School. After graduation, she worked for five years at the Sacramento office of Orrick, Herrington and Sutcliffe, and later opened her own private practice.

In 2003, Mueller was appointed as a United States Magistrate Judge of the Sacramento division of United States District Court for the Eastern District of California, becoming just the second woman to hold this position since the Eastern District was established in 1966.

Mueller was formerly an adjunct professor at the University of the Pacific McGeorge School of Law in Sacramento and UC Davis School of Law.

In January 2026, Mueller joined the faculty of Duke Law School as a professor of the practice and director of the Bolch Judicial Institute.

=== Federal judicial service ===
On March 10, 2010, President Barack Obama nominated Mueller to serve as United States district judge of the United States District Court for the Eastern District of California. Her nomination was unanimously confirmed by the United States Senate on December 16, 2010. Mueller received her commission on December 21, 2010. She became chief judge of the Eastern District of California on January 1, 2020. She assumed senior status on September 17, 2024, retiring on January 4, 2026.

=== Notable cases ===
On February 25, 2015, Mueller upheld California's Unsafe Handgun Act (also known as the handgun roster) as constitutional. The Ninth Circuit affirmed the opinion on August 3, 2018.

On April 17, 2015, Mueller held that criminal defendants charged with marijuana-related crimes had standing to bring a constitutional challenge to marijuana's Schedule I status, but ultimately rejected Defendants' constitutional arguments.

On December 21, 2015, Mueller rejected a First Amendment challenge, filed by crisis pregnancy centers, to California's law requiring them to provide notice to clients regarding the availability of abortions and contraception. The Ninth Circuit affirmed the decision, but the Supreme Court reversed it.

On December 29, 2022, Mueller upheld as constitutional California's ban on openly carrying handguns. The Ninth Circuit reversed the decision on June 29, 2023 saying Mueller "applied the incorrect legal standard" to the case, remanding back to District Court.

Mueller presided over the decades-long case Coleman v. Newsom, a class action challenging the conditions in California's prisons that resulted in a mandated reduction in the prison population and new requirements for medical care, mental health care, and suicide prevention in prisons. She also sat on the three-judge panel that adjudicates certain issues in Coleman and the related case, Brown v. Plata.

Mueller also issued some of the earliest decisions interpreting the First Step Act in the context of requests for compassionate release due to the risk of COVID-19 filed by incarcerated individuals with comorbidities.

== Post-Judicial Career ==
Following her retirement from the federal judiciary on January 4, 2026, Mueller joined the faculty of Duke Law School as the David F. Levi Professor of the Practice of Law and Judicial Studies and director of the Bolch Judicial Institute, succeeding Paul W. Grimm.

== See also ==
- List of first women lawyers and judges in California

Political offices
Preceded by William Smallman	Member of the Sacramento City Council for the 6th District; 1987–1992	Succeeded by Darrell Steinberg
Legal offices
Preceded by Frank C. Damrell Jr.	Judge of the United States District Court for the Eastern District of California; 2010–2024	Succeeded by Dena M. Coggins
Preceded by Lawrence Joseph O'Neill	Chief Judge of the United States District Court for the Eastern District of California; 2020–2024	Succeeded by Troy L. Nunley
