= Naomi Roht-Arriaza =

American lawyer

Naomi Roht-Arriaza is an American lawyer, currently a distinguished professor at University of California, Hastings.
