= Robert Everett Coyle =

American judge (1930–2012)

Senior Judge of the United States District Court for the Eastern District of California
- In office May 13, 1996 – May 7, 2012

Chief Judge of the United States District Court for the Eastern District of California
- In office 1990–1996
- Preceded by: Lawrence K. Karlton
- Succeeded by: William B. Shubb

Judge of the United States District Court for the Eastern District of California
- In office April 1, 1982 – May 13, 1996
- Appointed by: Ronald Reagan
- Preceded by: Myron Donovan Crocker
- Succeeded by: Anthony W. Ishii

Personal details
- Born: Robert Everett Coyle; May 6, 1930 Fresno, California, U.S.
- Died: May 7, 2012 (aged 82) Fresno, California, U.S.
- Education: Fresno State College (A.B.); University of California, Hastings; College of the Law (J.D.)

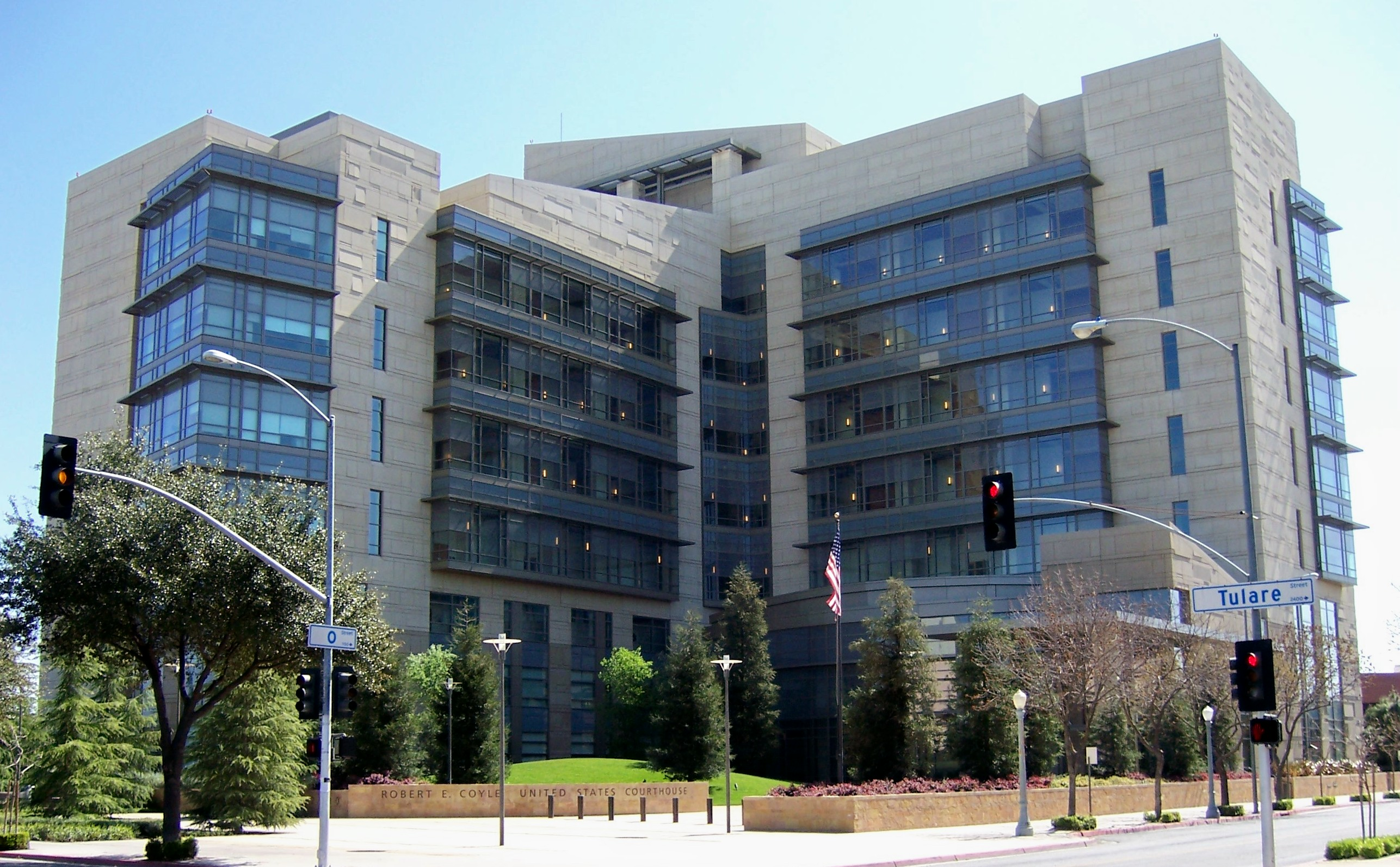
The Robert E. Coyle United States Courthouse is the new building housing the Eastern District of California, Fresno Division, Federal Courts.

Robert Everett Coyle (May 6, 1930 – May 7, 2012) was a United States district judge of the United States District Court for the Eastern District of California.

== Education and career ==
Coyle was born in Fresno, California and received an Artium Baccalaureus degree from Fresno State College (now California State University, Fresno) in 1953 and a Juris Doctor from the University of California, Hastings College of the Law in 1956. He was a Deputy district attorney of Fresno County, California from 1956 to 1958. He was in private practice in Fresno from 1958 to 1982.

== Federal judicial service ==
On March 11, 1982, Coyle was nominated by President Ronald Reagan to a seat on the United States District Court for the Eastern District of California vacated by Judge Myron Donovan Crocker. Coyle was confirmed by the United States Senate on March 31, 1982, and received his commission on April 1, 1982. He served as Chief Judge from 1990 to 1996, assuming senior status on May 13, 1996. He served in that status until his death on May 7, 2012, in Fresno.

== Sources ==
- John Ellis (8 May 2012). "Retired Federal Judge Robert Coyle Dies at 82". The Fresno Bee. Archived from the original on 11 May 2012.

Legal offices
Preceded by Myron Donovan Crocker	Judge of the United States District Court for the Eastern District of California; 1982–1996	Succeeded by Anthony W. Ishii
Preceded by Lawrence K. Karlton	Chief Judge of the United States District Court for the Eastern District of California; 1990–1996	Succeeded by William B. Shubb
