= Lawrence Joseph O'Neill =

American judge (born 1952)

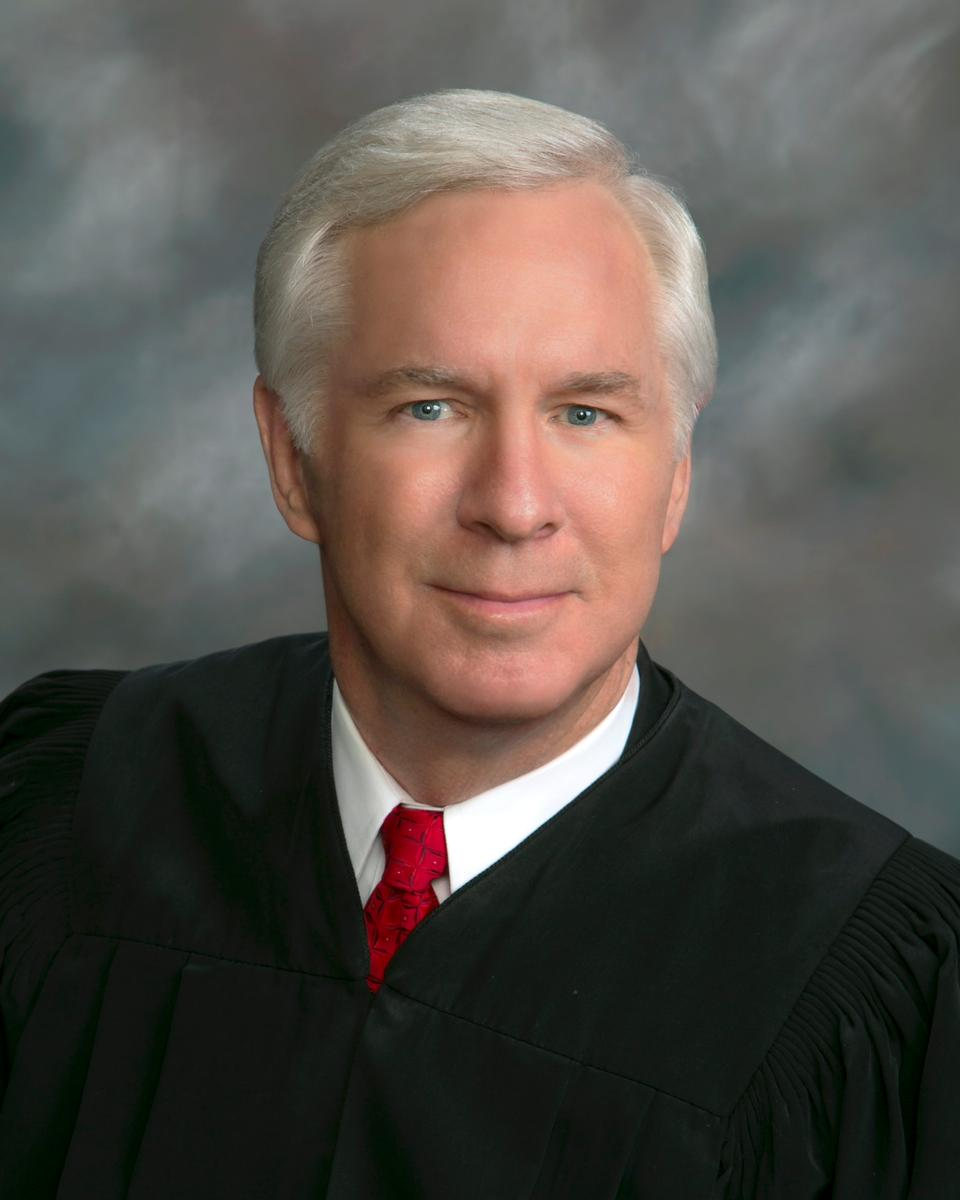

Senior Judge of the United States District Court for the Eastern District of California
- Incumbent
- Assumed office February 2, 2020

Chief Judge of the United States District Court for the Eastern District of California
- In office May 1, 2016 – December 31, 2019
- Preceded by: Morrison C. England Jr.
- Succeeded by: Kimberly J. Mueller

Judge of the United States District Court for the Eastern District of California
- In office February 2, 2007 – February 2, 2020
- Appointed by: George W. Bush
- Preceded by: Oliver Winston Wanger
- Succeeded by: Jennifer L. Thurston

Magistrate Judge of the United States District Court for the Eastern District of California
- In office 1999–2007

Personal details
- Born: Lawrence Joseph O'Neill; September 5, 1952 (age 73) Oakland, California, U.S.
- Education: University of California, Berkeley (BA); Golden Gate University (MPA); University of California College of the Law, San Francisco (JD)

Lawrence Joseph O'Neill (born September 5, 1952) is an inactive senior United States district judge of the United States District Court for the Eastern District of California.

== Early life and education ==
Born in Oakland, California, O'Neill served as a police officer for the City of San Leandro, California from 1973 to 1976. He received a Bachelor of Arts degree from the University of California at Berkeley in 1973, a Master of Public Administration degree from Golden Gate University in 1976, and a Juris Doctor from the University of California, Hastings College of the Law in 1979.

== Career ==
O'Neill was a law clerk to Judge Robert F. Kane, First Appellate Court, California Court of Appeal in 1979. He was in private practice in Fresno from 1979 to 1990. Between 1986 and 1992, he was an adjunct professor at San Joaquin College of Law in Clovis. He was a judge on the Fresno County Superior Court for the State of California from 1990 to 1999. From 1999 to 2007, O'Neill served as a United States magistrate judge of the United States District Court for the Eastern District of California.

== Federal judicial service ==
On January 9, 2007, O'Neill was nominated by President George W. Bush to a seat on the United States District Court for the Eastern District of California vacated by Oliver Winston Wanger. O'Neill was confirmed by the United States Senate on February 1, 2007, and received his commission on February 2, 2007. He served as Chief Judge from May 1, 2016, to December 31, 2019. He assumed inactive senior status on February 2, 2020.

== Sources ==
Legal offices
Preceded by Oliver Winston Wanger	Judge of the United States District Court for the Eastern District of California; 2007–2020	Succeeded by Jennifer L. Thurston
Preceded by Morrison C. England Jr.	Chief Judge of the United States District Court for the Eastern District of California; 2016–2019	Succeeded by Kimberly J. Mueller
