= Calvin R. Massey =

American legal scholar

- Born: 1951
- Died: 2015 (aged 63–64)
- Education: Pomona College; Columbia Law School
- Occupation: Professor of Law

Calvin R. Massey (1951–2015) was an American legal scholar known for his influential work in constitutional law and property law. He taught at UC Hastings College of the Law and the University of New Hampshire School of Law.

== Early life and education ==
Massey earned his Bachelor of Arts from Pomona College. He received his J.D. from Columbia Law School, where he served as Editor-in-Chief of the Columbia Law Review. After law school, he clerked for Judge James R. Browning of the United States Court of Appeals for the Ninth Circuit. He also practiced law at the firm of Morrison & Foerster in San Francisco.

== Academic career ==
Massey joined the faculty of UC Hastings in 1987. He taught courses including constitutional law, property law, and law and religion. He was known for his conceptual clarity and deep engagement with students. Later in his career, Massey became the Daniel Webster Distinguished Professor at the University of New Hampshire School of Law.

His scholarly work focused on structural constitutional principles, federalism, and individual rights. Massey authored the casebook American Constitutional Law: Powers and Liberties, which was widely adopted in law schools.

In September 2010, Massey conducted a public interview with U.S. Supreme Court Justice Antonin Scalia for University of California Television, discussing originalism, constitutional interpretation, and the role of the judiciary.

== Selected publications ==
Massey’s work includes:

- American Constitutional Law: Powers and Liberties (Aspen Publishers)
- “Federalism and the Rehnquist Court,” Hastings Constitutional Law Quarterly
- “The New Formalism: Requiem for Tiered Scrutiny?” University of Pennsylvania Journal of Constitutional Law

An annotated bibliography of his published scholarship appeared in a 2017 tribute in the Hastings Law Journal.

== Legacy ==
Massey was widely regarded by colleagues and students as a gifted educator and rigorous thinker. The Hastings Law Journal honored his life and scholarship by publishing a tribute and annotated bibliography following his death. His casebook and writings remain influential in legal education.
