= Roger Park =

Roger C. Park (1942-2026) was most recently a professor at UC Hastings College of the Law in San Francisco, California. He specialized in evidence. He received his B.A. cum laude from Harvard University, spent two years in military service, including Vietnam, then received his J.D. magna cum laude in 1969 from Harvard Law School, where he was Case Editor of the Harvard Law Review. After law school, he served as law clerk for Judge Bailey Aldrich of the U.S. Court of Appeals for the First Circuit and then practiced law for three years with a small civil rights firm in Boston. In 1973, he started teaching law at the University of Minnesota, where he became the Fredrikson & Byron Professor of Law. In 1995, he accepted a position at UC Hastings College of Law, where he became the Hervey Distinguished Professor of Law.

He is co-author of the textbook Evidence: Cases and Materials (12th Ed. Foundation Press 2013), and numerous publications on evidence, including: "A Subject Matter Approach to Hearsay Reform," 86 Mich. L. Rev. 51 (1987), "Character at the Crossroads," 49 Hastings L.J. 717 (1998), and "Grand Perspectives on Evidence Law" (Va. L. J. 2001). On January 6, 2018, he received the Wigmore Award for lifetime achievement from the Evidence Section of the American Association of Law Schools.
