= Lum (surname) =

- Language: Middle English, Chinese (Cantonese and Hakka)

Other names
- Variant forms: English: Lumb; Chinese: Lin, Lan, Lam

Lum is a surname.

== Origins ==
As a Chinese surname, Lum may be an ad hoc spelling, based on the pronunciation in different varieties of Chinese, of the following surnames. Those surnames are listed below by their romanisation in Hanyu Pinyin, which reflects the standard Mandarin pronunciation:

- Lín (林), spelled Lum based on its Cantonese pronunciation (Jyutping: Lam4; Cantonese Yale: Làhm)
- Lán (藍), spelled Lum based on its Hakka pronunciation

The English surname Lum is a variant spelling of Lumb, which originated either as a toponymic surname referring to Lumb in Lancashire, or from the Middle English word lum ("pool").

== Statistics ==
Statistics compiled by Patrick Hanks on the basis of the 2011 United Kingdom census and the Census of Ireland 2011 found 190 people with the surname Lum on the island of Great Britain and one on the island of Ireland. In the 1881 United Kingdom census there were 76 bearers of the surname, primarily at West Yorkshire. The 2010 United States census found 8,060 people with the surname Lum, making it the 4,406th-most-common surname in the country. This was roughly the same number of people as in the 2000 census (8,044 people; 4,042nd-most-common). In the 2010 census, roughly 17% of the bearers of the surname identified as non-Hispanic white, while the number identifying as Asian decreased from 68% in the 2000 census to 62% in the 2010 census.

== People ==
=== Arts and entertainment ===
- Bertha Lum (1869–1954), American artist
- Wayne Lum (1943–2006), Canadian sculptor of Chinese descent
- Wing Tek Lum (林永得; born 1945), American poet
- Mary Lum (artist) (born 1951), American artist
- Agnes Lum (born 1956), American bikini model of Chinese and Hawaiian descent
- Ken Lum (林荫庭; born 1956), Canadian professor of fine arts
- Awkwafina (Nora Lum 林家珍; born 1988), American actress and comedian
- Debbie Lum (fl. 1991–present), American documentary filmmaker of Chinese descent
- Zachary Alakaʻi Lum (born 1992), American musician from Hawaii
- Peter Lum (fl. 2007–present), Malaysian fashion stylist

=== Sport ===
- Lum Pao-Hua (林寶華; 1906–1965), Australian-born tennis player who later represented China
- Mike Lum (born 1945), American baseball player
- Sabrina Lum (林鳳珠; born 1971), swimmer who represented Chinese Taipei at the 1988 Summer Olympics
- Kristina Lum (born 1976), American synchronized swimmer
- Erin Lum (born 1977), American judo athlete from Guam
- Jared Lum (林恩許; born 1992), Australian footballer based in Hong Kong
- Leah Lum (born 1996), Canadian ice hockey forward
- Nicholas Lum (born 2005), Australian table tennis player

=== Other ===
- Mary Lum (1758–1815), wife of American banker Stephen Girard
- Dyer Lum (1839–1893), American anarchist and labor activist
- C. E. Lum (1852–1941), American politician
- Walter U. Lum (林華耀; 1882–1961), American newspaper editor and civil rights activist
- Emma Ping Lum (1910–1989), first American woman lawyer of Chinese descent, daughter of Walter U. Lum
- Olivia Lum (林爱莲; born 1962), Singaporean water treatment systems businesswoman
