= List of United Kingdom locations: Lu-Ly =

The United Kingdom

This is part of the list of United Kingdom locations: a gazetteer of place names in the United Kingdom showing each place's locality and geographical coordinates.

== Lu ==
Location	Locality	Coordinates (links to map & photo sources)	OS grid reference
Lubberland	Shropshire	52.39°N 02.55°W	SO6277
Lubenham	Leicestershire	52.47°N 00.97°W	SP7087
Lubinvullin	Highland	58.54°N 04.45°W	NC5764
Lucas End	Hertfordshire	51.71°N 00.09°W	TL3203
Lucas Green	Lancashire	53.67°N 02.63°W	SD5820
Lucas Green	Surrey	51.32°N 00.65°W	SU9459
Luccombe	Somerset	51.18°N 03.56°W	SS9144
Luccombe Village	Isle of Wight	50.60°N 01.18°W	SZ5879
Lucker	Northumberland	55.56°N 01.76°W	NU1530
Luckett	Cornwall	50.53°N 04.28°W	SX3873
Lucking Street	Essex	51.97°N 00.63°E	TL8134
Luckington	Wiltshire	51.54°N 02.24°W	ST8383
Lucklawhill	Fife	56.37°N 02.94°W	NO4221
Luckwell Bridge	Somerset	51.13°N 03.57°W	SS9038
Lucton	Herefordshire	52.27°N 02.83°W	SO4364
Ludborough	Lincolnshire	53.43°N 00.05°W	TF2995
Ludbrook	Devon	50.37°N 03.89°W	SX6554
Ludchurch	Pembrokeshire	51.75°N 04.69°W	SN1410
Luddenden	Calderdale	53.73°N 01.94°W	SE0426
Luddenden Foot	Calderdale	53.71°N 01.94°W	SE0424
Ludderburn	Cumbria	54.31°N 02.92°W	SD4091
Luddesdown	Kent	51.36°N 00.39°E	TQ6766
Luddington	North Lincolnshire	53.63°N 00.76°W	SE8216
Luddington	Warwickshire	52.16°N 01.76°W	SP1652
Luddington-in-the-Brook	Northamptonshire	52.43°N 00.38°W	TL1083
Ludford	Lincolnshire	53.38°N 00.21°W	TF1989
Ludford	Shropshire	52.35°N 02.72°W	SO5173
Ludgershall	Buckinghamshire	51.84°N 01.04°W	SP6617
Ludgershall	Wiltshire	51.24°N 01.62°W	SU2650
Ludgvan	Cornwall	50.14°N 05.50°W	SW5033
Ludham	Norfolk	52.70°N 01.52°E	TG3818
Ludlow	Shropshire	52.36°N 02.72°W	SO5174
Ludney	Lincolnshire	53.43°N 00.09°E	TF3995
Ludney	Somerset	50.90°N 02.88°W	ST3812
Ludstock	Gloucestershire	52.01°N 02.46°W	SO6835
Ludstone	Shropshire	52.54°N 02.29°W	SO8094
Ludwell	Wiltshire	50.99°N 02.12°W	ST9122
Ludworth	Durham	54.76°N 01.44°W	NZ3641
Luffenhall	Hertfordshire	51.93°N 00.12°W	TL2928
Luffincott	Devon	50.72°N 04.36°W	SX3394
Lufton	Somerset	50.94°N 02.69°W	ST5116
Lugar	East Ayrshire	55.46°N 04.24°W	NS5821
Lugate	Scottish Borders	55.67°N 02.89°W	NT4443
Luggate Burn	East Lothian	55.95°N 02.65°W	NT5974
Lugg Green	Herefordshire	52.25°N 02.82°W	SO4462
Luggiebank	North Lanarkshire	55.92°N 03.98°W	NS7672
Lugsdale	Cheshire	53.36°N 02.72°W	SJ5285
Lugton	East Ayrshire	55.73°N 04.53°W	NS4152
Lugwardine	Herefordshire	52.06°N 02.67°W	SO5441
Luib	Highland	57.26°N 06.04°W	NG5627
Luib	Stirling	56.41°N 04.44°W	NN4927
Luing	Argyll and Bute	56.23°N 05.63°W	NM746103
Luinga Mhor	Highland	56.90°N 05.92°W	NM612856
Luirsay Dubh	Western Isles	57.34°N 07.20°W	NF868402
Lulham	Herefordshire	52.06°N 02.87°W	SO4041
Lullington	Derbyshire	52.71°N 01.63°W	SK2513
Lullington	Somerset	51.25°N 02.31°W	ST7851
Lulsgate Bottom	North Somerset	51.38°N 02.71°W	ST5065
Lulsley	Worcestershire	52.19°N 02.38°W	SO7455
Lulworth Camp	Dorset	50.62°N 02.24°W	SY8381
Lumb	Kirklees	53.61°N 01.77°W	SE1513
Lumb (Rawtenstall)	Lancashire	53.71°N 02.25°W	SD8324
Lumb (Edenfield)	Lancashire	53.66°N 02.33°W	SD7819
Lumb Foot	Bradford	53.82°N 01.98°W	SE0137
Lumburn	Devon	50.53°N 04.18°W	SX4573
Lumbutts	Calderdale	53.70°N 02.07°W	SD9523
Lumby	North Yorkshire	53.76°N 01.27°W	SE4830
Lumley	Hampshire	50.84°N 00.93°W	SU7506
Lumley Thicks	Durham	54.84°N 01.53°W	NZ3050
Lumloch	City of Glasgow	55.89°N 04.19°W	NS6369
Lumphanan	Aberdeenshire	57.12°N 02.69°W	NJ5804
Lumphinnans	Fife	56.11°N 03.33°W	NT1792
Lumsden	Aberdeenshire	57.27°N 02.88°W	NJ4721
Lunan	Angus	56.65°N 02.52°W	NO6851
Lunanhead	Angus	56.65°N 02.86°W	NO4752
Luncarty	Perth and Kinross	56.44°N 03.47°W	NO0929
Lund	East Riding of Yorkshire	53.91°N 00.52°W	SE9748
Lund	North Yorkshire	53.78°N 01.01°W	SE6532
Lundie	Angus	56.51°N 03.15°W	NO2936
Lunds	North Yorkshire	54.35°N 02.32°W	SD7994
Lundwood	Barnsley	53.55°N 01.44°W	SE3707
Lundy	Devon	51.16°N 04.66°W	SS136445
Lundy Green	Norfolk	52.48°N 01.29°E	TM2492
Lunga	Argyll and Bute	56.21°N 05.70°W	NM706086
Lunna	Shetland Islands	60.40°N 01.13°W	HU4869
Lunna Holm	Shetland Islands	60.45°N 01.04°W	HU528746
Lunnasting	Shetland Islands	60.36°N 01.13°W	HU4865
Lunning	Shetland Islands	60.38°N 01.09°W	HU5067
Lunnister	Shetland Islands	60.42°N 01.38°W	HU3471
Lunnon	Swansea	51.58°N 04.10°W	SS5489
Lunsford	Kent	51.30°N 00.42°E	TQ6959
Lunsford's Cross	East Sussex	50.86°N 00.44°E	TQ7210
Lunt	Sefton	53.50°N 02.99°W	SD3401
Lunts Heath	Cheshire	53.38°N 02.73°W	SJ5188
Lupin	Staffordshire	52.74°N 01.79°W	SK1416
Luppitt	Devon	50.84°N 03.19°W	ST1606
Lupridge	Devon	50.36°N 03.81°W	SX7153
Lupset	Wakefield	53.66°N 01.53°W	SE3119
Lupton	Cumbria	54.22°N 02.69°W	SD5581
Lurgashall	West Sussex	51.03°N 00.67°W	SU9327
Lurley	Devon	50.91°N 03.53°W	SS9214
Lusby	Lincolnshire	53.18°N 00.01°W	TF3367
Lushcott	Shropshire	52.55°N 02.66°W	SO5595
Luson	Devon	50.33°N 03.96°W	SX6050
Luss	Argyll and Bute	56.09°N 04.65°W	NS3592
Lussa Point	Argyll and Bute	56.01°N 05.78°W	NR642867
Lusta	Highland	57.51°N 06.57°W	NG2656
Lustleigh	Devon	50.61°N 03.72°W	SX7881
Lustleigh Cleave	Devon	50.61°N 03.75°W	SX7681
Luston	Herefordshire	52.26°N 02.76°W	SO4863
Lusty	Somerset	51.10°N 02.45°W	ST6834
Luthermuir	Aberdeenshire	56.80°N 02.57°W	NO6568
Luthrie	Fife	56.35°N 03.08°W	NO3319
Lutley	Dudley	52.44°N 02.08°W	SO9483
Luton (East Devon)	Devon	50.81°N 03.30°W	ST0802
Luton (Teignbridge)	Devon	50.57°N 03.55°W	SX9076
Luton	Kent	51.36°N 00.52°E	TQ7666
Luton	Luton	51.87°N 00.41°W	TL0921
Lutsford	Devon	50.94°N 04.49°W	SS2519
Lutterworth	Leicestershire	52.45°N 01.20°W	SP5484
Lutton (South Brent)	Devon	50.43°N 03.84°W	SX6961
Lutton (Cornwood)	Devon	50.41°N 03.98°W	SX5959
Lutton	Lincolnshire	52.80°N 00.12°E	TF4325
Lutton	Northamptonshire	52.46°N 00.36°W	TL1187
Lutton Gowts	Lincolnshire	52.79°N 00.11°E	TF4324
Luxborough	Somerset	51.13°N 03.47°W	SS9738
Luxley	Gloucestershire	51.88°N 02.46°W	SO6821
Luxted	Bromley	51.32°N 00.05°E	TQ4360
Luxton	Devon	50.89°N 03.12°W	ST2111
Luxulyan	Cornwall	50.38°N 04.74°W	SX0558
Luzley	Tameside	53.50°N 02.06°W	SD9601
Luzley Brook	Oldham	53.55°N 02.12°W	SD9207

== Ly ==
Location	Locality	Coordinates (links to map & photo sources)	OS grid reference
Lyatts	Somerset	50.89°N 02.68°W	ST5211
Lybster	Highland	58.29°N 03.29°W	ND2435
Lydbury North	Shropshire	52.46°N 02.95°W	SO3586
Lydcott	Devon	51.10°N 03.87°W	SS6936
Lydd	Kent	50.94°N 00.90°E	TR0420
Lydden (Dover)	Kent	51.15°N 01.23°E	TR2645
Lydden (Thanet)	Kent	51.35°N 01.37°E	TR3567
Lyddington	Rutland	52.56°N 00.71°W	SP8797
Lydd-on-Sea	Kent	50.94°N 00.95°E	TR0820
Lyde	Shropshire	52.60°N 03.02°W	SJ3101
Lydeard St Lawrence	Somerset	51.08°N 03.25°W	ST1232
Lyde Cross	Herefordshire	52.08°N 02.71°W	SO5143
Lyde Green	Hampshire	51.30°N 00.99°W	SU7057
Lyde Green	South Gloucestershire	51.50°N 02.47°W	ST6778
Lydford	Devon	50.63°N 04.10°W	SX5184
Lydford Fair Place	Somerset	51.08°N 02.61°W	ST5732
Lydford-on-Fosse	Somerset	51.06°N 02.62°W	ST5630
Lydgate	Calderdale	53.72°N 02.12°W	SD9225
Lydgate	Oldham	53.53°N 02.04°W	SD9704
Lydham	Shropshire	52.50°N 02.98°W	SO3390
Lydiard Green	Wiltshire	51.56°N 01.88°W	SU0885
Lydiard Millicent	Wiltshire	51.56°N 01.87°W	SU0985
Lydiard Plain	Wiltshire	51.57°N 01.92°W	SU0586
Lydiard Tregoze	Wiltshire	51.55°N 01.85°W	SU1084
Lydiate	Sefton	53.52°N 02.95°W	SD3704
Lydiate Ash	Worcestershire	52.37°N 02.04°W	SO9775
Lydlinch	Dorset	50.91°N 02.37°W	ST7413
Lydmarsh	Somerset	50.86°N 02.92°W	ST3508
Lydney	Gloucestershire	51.72°N 02.53°W	SO6303
Lydstep	Pembrokeshire	51.64°N 04.77°W	SS0898
Lye	Dudley	52.45°N 02.11°W	SO9284
Lye Cross	North Somerset	51.35°N 02.73°W	ST4962
Lye Green	Buckinghamshire	51.71°N 00.59°W	SP9703
Lye Green	East Sussex	51.08°N 00.15°E	TQ5134
Lye Green	Warwickshire	52.28°N 01.72°W	SP1965
Lye Green	Wiltshire	51.32°N 02.27°W	ST8159
Lye Head	Worcestershire	52.35°N 02.36°W	SO7573
Lye Hole	North Somerset	51.35°N 02.71°W	ST5062
Lyewood Common	East Sussex	51.11°N 00.14°E	TQ5037
Lyford	Oxfordshire	51.64°N 01.43°W	SU3994
Lymbridge Green	Kent	51.14°N 01.02°E	TR1243
Lyme Green	Cheshire	53.22°N 02.13°W	SJ9170
Lyme Regis	Dorset	50.72°N 02.93°W	SY3492
Lymiecleuch	Scottish Borders	55.30°N 02.97°W	NT3802
Lyminge	Kent	51.12°N 01.08°E	TR1641
Lymington	Hampshire	50.75°N 01.54°W	SZ3295
Lyminster	West Sussex	50.82°N 00.55°W	TQ0204
Lymm	Cheshire	53.37°N 02.48°W	SJ6887
Lymore	Hampshire	50.72°N 01.59°W	SZ2992
Lympne	Kent	51.07°N 01.02°E	TR1235
Lympsham	Somerset	51.28°N 02.96°W	ST3354
Lympstone	Devon	50.64°N 03.43°W	SX9984
Lynbridge	Devon	51.21°N 03.83°W	SS7248
Lynch	Hampshire	51.23°N 01.28°W	SU5049
Lynch	Somerset	51.21°N 03.57°W	SS9047
Lynchat	Highland	57.08°N 04.01°W	NH7801
Lynchgate	Shropshire	52.45°N 02.92°W	SO3785
Lynch Hill	Berkshire	51.52°N 00.64°W	SU9482
Lynch Hill	Hampshire	51.22°N 01.34°W	SU4648
Lyndhurst	Hampshire	50.87°N 01.58°W	SU2908
Lyndon	Rutland	52.62°N 00.67°W	SK9004
Lyndon Green	Birmingham	52.46°N 01.79°W	SP1485
Lyne	Scottish Borders	55.65°N 03.27°W	NT2041
Lyneal	Shropshire	52.89°N 02.83°W	SJ4433
Lyneal Mill	Shropshire	52.88°N 02.81°W	SJ4532
Lyneal Wood	Shropshire	52.87°N 02.81°W	SJ4531
Lyne Down	Herefordshire	51.97°N 02.52°W	SO6431
Lyneham	Oxfordshire	51.87°N 01.60°W	SP2720
Lyneham	Wiltshire	51.50°N 01.97°W	SU0278
Lynemouth	Northumberland	55.21°N 01.54°W	NZ2991
Lyne of Gorthleck	Highland	57.24°N 04.43°W	NH5320
Lyne of Skene	Aberdeenshire	57.18°N 02.39°W	NJ7610
Lyness	Orkney Islands	58.82°N 03.21°W	ND3094
Lyne Station	Scottish Borders	55.63°N 03.25°W	NT2139
Lynford	Norfolk	52.48°N 00.66°E	TL8191
Lyng	Norfolk	52.71°N 01.04°E	TG0617
Lyng	Somerset	51.04°N 02.97°W	ST3228
Lyngate (Worstead)	Norfolk	52.78°N 01.40°E	TG3026
Lyngate (North Walsham)	Norfolk	52.82°N 01.36°E	TG2731
Lyngford	Somerset	51.01°N 03.09°W	ST2325
Lynmouth	Devon	51.22°N 03.83°W	SS7249
Lynn	Shropshire	52.73°N 02.32°W	SJ7815
Lynn	Staffordshire	52.63°N 01.88°W	SK0804
Lynnwood	Scottish Borders	55.40°N 02.80°W	NT4913
Lynsore Bottom	Kent	51.19°N 01.09°E	TR1649
Lynsted	Kent	51.30°N 00.78°E	TQ9460
Lynstone	Cornwall	50.81°N 04.55°W	SS2005
Lynton	Devon	51.22°N 03.84°W	SS7149
Lynwilg	Highland	57.16°N 03.87°W	NH8710
Lynworth	Gloucestershire	51.90°N 02.05°W	SO9623
Lyons	Sunderland	54.80°N 01.44°W	NZ3646
Lyon's Gate	Dorset	50.84°N 02.48°W	ST6605
Lyon's Green	Norfolk	52.66°N 00.82°E	TF9111
Lyonshall	Herefordshire	52.18°N 02.98°W	SO3355
Lyons Hall	Essex	51.80°N 00.50°E	TL7315
Lypiatt	Gloucestershire	51.77°N 02.10°W	SO9308
Lytchett Matravers	Dorset	50.75°N 02.08°W	SY9495
Lytchett Minster	Dorset	50.72°N 02.07°W	SY9592
Lytham	Lancashire	53.73°N 02.98°W	SD3527
Lytham St Anne's	Lancashire	53.73°N 03.01°W	SD3327
Lythbank	Shropshire	52.65°N 02.79°W	SJ4607
Lythe	North Yorkshire	54.51°N 00.69°W	NZ8413
Lythes	Orkney Islands	58.78°N 02.95°W	ND4589
