= List of first women lawyers and judges in California =

This is a list of the first women lawyer(s) and judge(s) in California. It includes the year in which the women were admitted to practice law (in parentheses). Also included are women who achieved other distinctions such becoming the first in their state to graduate from law school or become a political figure.

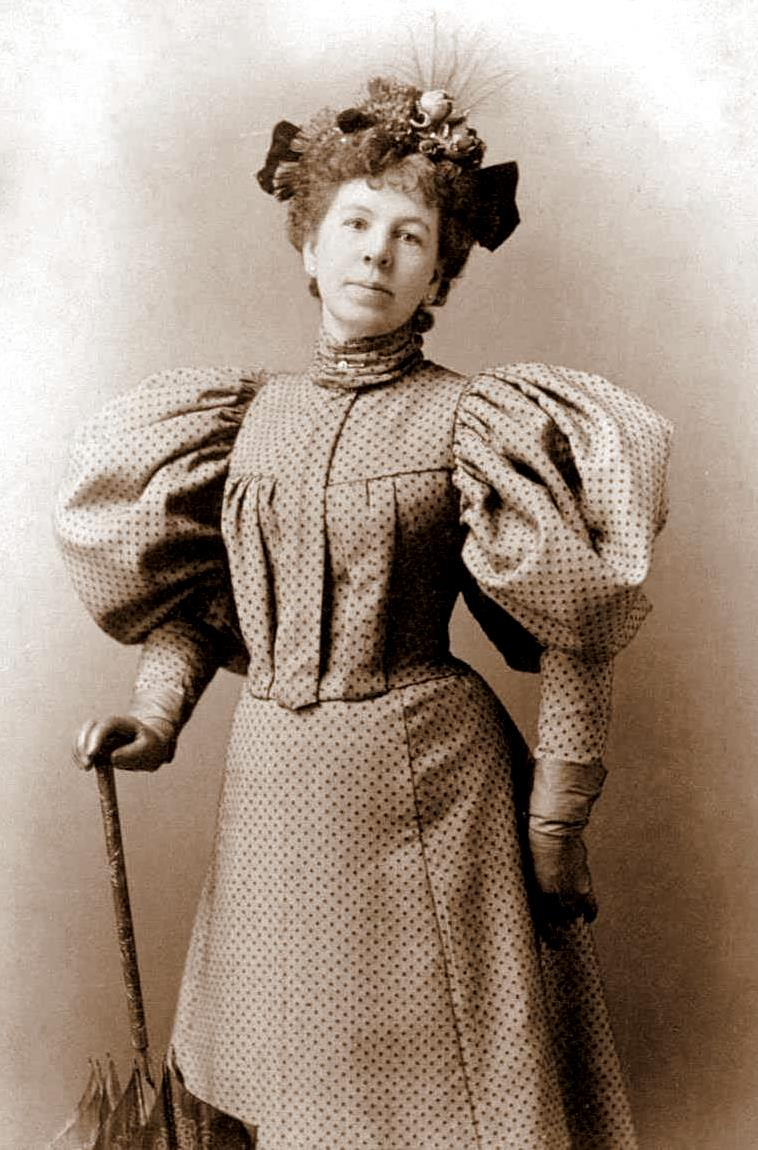
Clara Shortridge Foltz: First female lawyer in California (1878)

== Firsts in state history ==
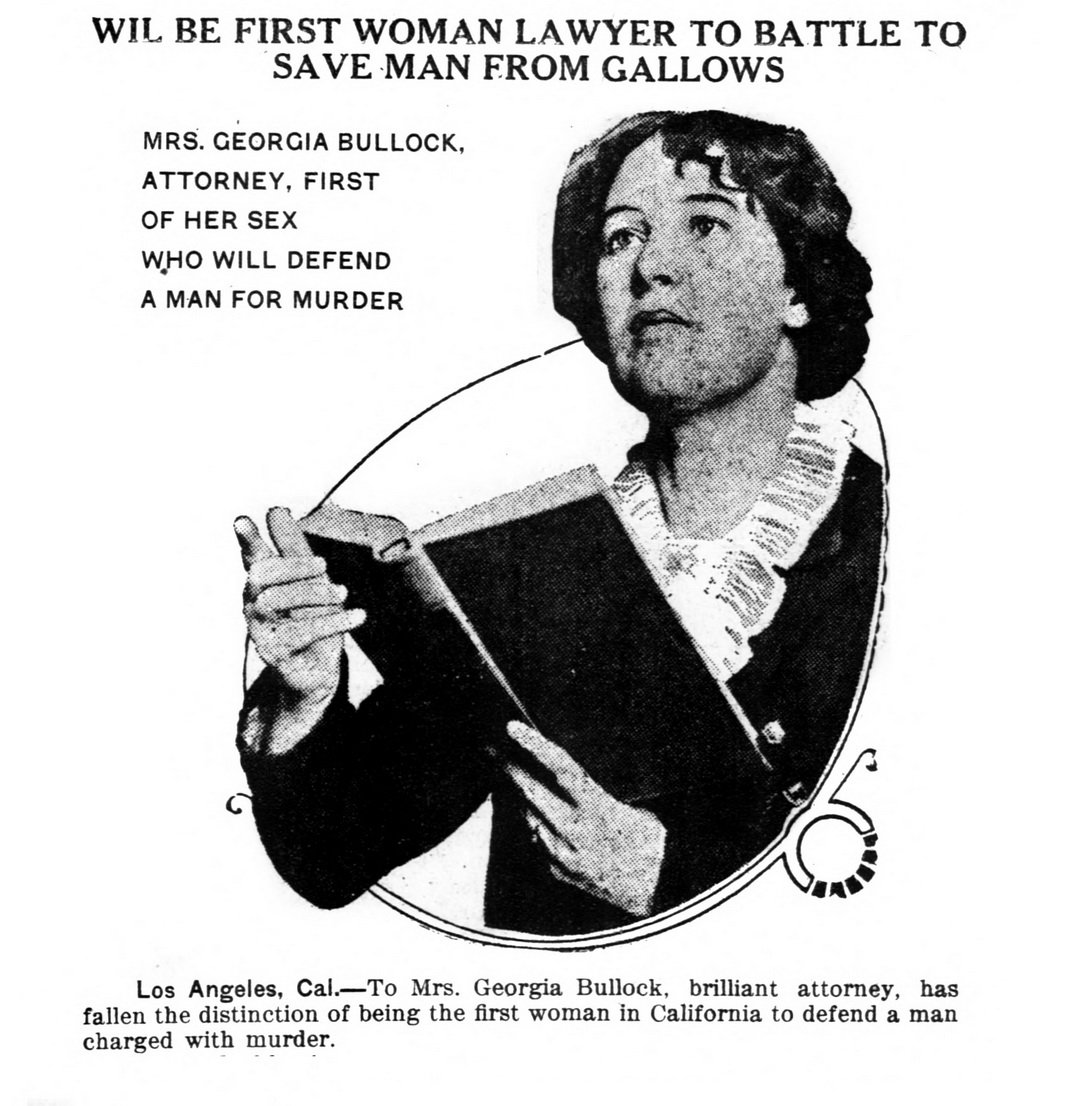
Georgia Bullock: First female judge in California (1924)

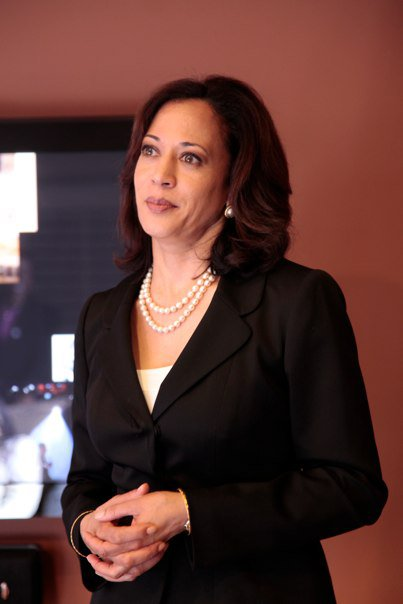
Kamala Harris: First female Attorney General of California (2011)

=== Law School ===
- Mary McHenry Keith: First female law graduate in California (1882)

=== Lawyers ===
- Clara Shortridge Foltz (1878): First female lawyer (and notary public) in California
- Mary Josephine Young: First female lawyer admitted to practice before the Supreme Court of California (1879)
- Christine la Barraque (c. 1906): First blind female lawyer in California
- Stella Ajamian Edwarde (1922): First Armenian American female lawyer in California
- Annie Coker (1929): First African American female lawyer in California
- Chiyoko Sakamoto (Takahashi) (1938): First Japanese American female lawyer in California
- Emma Ping Lum (c. 1946): First Chinese American female lawyer in California
- Mary Virginia Orozco (1962): First Latino American female lawyer in California
- Eleanor Nisperos (1972): First Filipino American female lawyer in California
- Abby Abinanti (1974): First Native American (Yurok) female lawyer in California
- Sofia L. Nietes (1975): First Filipino American female educated in the Philippines to be admitted to the California State Bar
- Norma Samra (1986): First Indian American female lawyer in California
- Mia Yamamoto: First openly transgender (woman) defense lawyer in California (2005)
- Farah Abdulrahman Al-Muftah (2011): First Qatari female admitted to the California State Bar
- Vanessa Pumar (2015): First undocumented female lawyer in California
- Leila Alamri-Kassim (2017): First Yemeni American female lawyer in California

=== State judges ===
- Lillie M. Laird, Clara Jess and Edna Jesse Keeran: First female Justices of the Peace respectively in California (1912–1913)
- Georgia Bullock (1913): First female judge in California (1924)
- Annette Abbott Adams (1912): First female to serve as an appellate court judge in California (upon her appointment as a Presiding Justice of the Court of Appeal of the Third Appellate District in 1942)
- Mildred Lillie (1938): First female to serve as Associate Justice of any California appellate court (Second District-1958). Later was elevated to Presiding Justice of the Second District Court of Appeal (1982)
- Vaino Spencer (1952): First African American female judge in California (1961)
- Ann H. Rutherford (1967): First female to serve as a judge in a rural county in California (Butte; 1976)
- Margaret J. Morris (1953): First female to serve as an Associate Justice (1976) and Presiding Justice of the Fourth District Court of Appeal in California (1982)
- Rose Bird (1966): First female to serve on the California Supreme Court (1977) and serve as its Chief Justice (1977)
- Frances Munoz (1972): First Latino American female judge in California (1978)
- Abby Soven: First openly lesbian judge in California (1978)
- Joan Dempsey Klein (1955): First female presiding justice of the Second District Court of Appeal (1978)
- Patricia A. Yim Cowett (1972): First Chinese American female judge in California (1979)
- Arleigh M. Woods (1953): First African American female to serve on the Court of Appeals in California (1980)
- Betty Barry-Deal (1955): First female to serve on the First District Court of Appeal in California (1980)
- Lillian Sing (1975): First Chinese American female judge in California (1981)
- Pauline Hanson (1946): First female to serve on the Fifth District Court of Appeal in California (1985)
- Sheila Prell Sonenshine: First Jewish American female to serve as a Judge of a California Court of Appeal (1985)
- Lillian Y. Lim (1977): First Filipino American female judge in California (1986)
- Patricia D. Benke (1974): First female to serve on the Fourth District Court of Appeal (1987)
- Joyce L. Kennard: First disabled and Asian American (female) to serve on the California Court of Appeal (1988) and California Supreme Court (1994)
- Shala Sabet (1985): First Iranian American female judge in California (1993)
- Ramona Perez (1972): First Latino American female to serve on the California Court of Appeal (1993)
- Kathleen Akao (1982): First Asian American female elected as a judge in California (1994)
- Janice Rogers Brown (1977): First African American female to serve on the Third District Court of Appeal in California (1994)
- Abby Abinanti (1974): First Native American (Yurok) female judge in California
- Janice Rogers Brown (1977): First African American female to serve on the California Supreme Court (1996)
- Rosemary Pfeiffer (1977): First openly LGBT (female) to serve as a Presiding Judge in California (2000)
- Eileen Moore: First female veteran to serve as a Judge of the California Court of Appeal (2000)
- Tammy Chung Ryu (1987): First Korean American female judge in California (2002)
- Barbara Kronlund: First South Asian American female judge in California (2005)
- Le Jacqueline Duong: First Vietnamese American female judge in California (2007)
- Carol Codrington (1987): First African American female to serve on the Fourth District Court of Appeal in California (2010)
- Cheri Pham: First Vietnamese American (female) elected as a judge in California (2010)
- Kathleen O'Leary (1975): First female to serve as the Presiding Justice of the Fourth District Court of Appeal (2011)
- Victoria Kolakowski (1991): First openly LGBT judge elected in California (2011)
- Tani Cantil-Sakauye (1984): First Asian-Filipino American female to serve as the Chief Justice of the California Supreme Court (2011)
- Therese M. Stewart (1982): First openly LGBT female to serve on the California Court of Appeal (2014)
- Carin T. Fujisaki (1985): First Asian-Pacific Islander female to serve on the First District Court of Appeal in California (2018)
- Marsha G. Slough (1987): First openly LGBT female to serve on the Fourth District Court of Appeal (2015)
- Neetu Badhan Smith: First female Sikh judge in California (2017)
- Dorothy Kim (2000): First Korean American (female) to serve on the Second District Court of Appeal in California (2018)
- Jana Seng: First Cambodian American (female) judge in California (2018)
- Amy Ashvanian: First Armenian-born (female) judge in California (2018)
- Teri L. Jackson (1981): First African American female to serve on the First District Court of Appeal in California (2020)
- Truc T. Do (1997): First Asian American (female of Vietnamese descent) to serve on the Fourth District Court of Appeal in California (2020)
- Andi Mudryk: First openly LGBT judge appointed in California (2022)
- Laurie Earl: First openly LGBT female to serve on the Third District Court of Appeal in California (2022)
- Patricia Guerrero: First Latino American female to serve on the California Supreme Court (2022) and its Chief Justice (2023)
- Pahoua C. Lor (2009): First Hmong American female appointed to serve as judge in California (2022)
- Kelli Evans: First openly (African American) lesbian to serve on the California Supreme Court (2022)
- Cheri Pham: First Vietnamese American (female) to serve as an Assistant Presiding Judge in California (2023)
- Shama H. Mesiwala (1998): First South Asian American and Muslim (female) to serve as a Judge of a California Court of Appeal (2023)
- Malalai Farooqi: First Afghan American (female) judge in California (2026)

=== Federal judges ===
- Shirley Hufstedler (1950): First female to serve on the U.S. Court of Appeals for the Ninth Circuit (1968)
- Mariana Pfaelzer (1957): First female to serve on the U.S. District Court for the Central District of California (1978)
- Saundra Brown Armstrong (1977): First African American female to serve on the United States District Court for the Northern District of California (1991)
- Marilyn Hall Patel (1963): First female to serve on the U.S. District Court for the Northern District of California (1980) and its Chief Judge (1997)
- Kim McLane Wardlaw (1979): First Hispanic American female to serve on the U.S. Court of Appeals for the Ninth Circuit (1998)
- Consuelo B. Marshall (1962): First female (and African American female) to serve as the Chief Judge of the U.S. District Court for the Central District of California (2001)
- Audrey B. Collins (1977): First African American female judge to serve as Chief Judge of the U.S. District Court for the Central District of California (2009)
- Dolly M. Gee (1984): First Chinese American female to serve on the U.S. District Court for the Central District of California (2010)
- Donna Ryu: First openly LGBT female to serve on the United States District Court for the Northern District of California (2010). She is also the first Korean American (female) judge on the court.
- Jacqueline Nguyen (1991): First Vietnamese American female to serve on the U.S. District Court for the Central District of California
- Yvonne Gonzalez Rogers (1991): First Latino American female justice to serve on the U.S. District Court for the Northern District of California (2011)
- Lucy H. Koh (1993): First Korean American female to serve on the U.S. District Court for the Northern District of California (2010)
- Kimberly J. Mueller (1995): First female to serve on the U.S. District Court for the Eastern District of California (2010)
- Phyllis J. Hamilton (1976): First African American female judge to serve as the Chief Judge of the U.S. District Court for the Northern District of California (2014)
- Jinsook Ohta: First Asian American female (who is of Korean descent) to serve on the U.S. District Court for the Southern District of California (2021)
- Sunshine Sykes (2002): First Native American (Navajo) [female] to serve on the United States District Court for the Central District of California (2022)
- Holly A. Thomas (2004): First African American female to serve on the U.S. Court of Appeals for the Ninth Circuit (2022)
- Ana de Alba: First Latino American female to serve as the Judge of the United States District Court for the Eastern District of California (2022)
- Roopali Desai: First South Asian (female) to serve as a Judge of the United States Court of Appeals for the Ninth Circuit (upon taking oath; confirmed 2022)
- Rita F. Lin: First Chinese American female to serve as a Judge of the United States District Court for the Northern District of California (2023)
- Kenly Kiya Kato: First Japanese American female to serve as a Judge of the United States District Court for the Central District of California (2023)

=== Attorney General ===
- Elizabeth Palmer: First female to temporarily serve as the Attorney General of California (1976)
- Kamala Harris (1989): First (African American and Indian American) female to serve as the Attorney General of California (2011–2017)

=== Deputy Attorneys General ===
- Miriam Wolff and Pauli Murray (1945): First females to serve as the Deputy Attorney General of California respectively in 1945 and 1946. Murray was also the first African American female.

=== Assistant Attorney General ===
- Doris H. Maier (1935): First female Assistant Attorney General of California (1961)
- Andrea Sheridan Ordin: First female to serve as the Chief Assistant Attorney General of California (1983)

=== United States Attorney ===
- Annette Abbott Adams (1912): First female to serve as a U.S. for the Northern District of California (1918–1920)
- Andrea Ordin (1966): First female appointed as the U.S. Attorney for the Central District of California (1977)
- Debra Wong Yang (1986): First Asian American female appointed as the U.S. Attorney for the Central District of California (2002–2006)
- Carol Lam: First Asian American female appointed as the U.S. Attorney for the Southern District of California (2002)

=== Federal Public Defender ===
- Anne Hwang: First Asian American (female) to serve as the Chief Deputy Federal Public Defender for the Central District of California (c. 2016)

=== District Attorney ===
- June Schnacke: First female to serve as a District Attorney in California (1947)
- Gale Cuneo: First female elected as a District Attorney in California (1979)
- Kamala Harris (1989): First African American and Indian American female to become a District Attorney in California (2004–2010)

=== Deputy District Attorney ===
- Clara Shortridge Foltz (1878): First female Deputy District Attorney in California (1910)
- Marion L. Obera (1962): First African American female to serve as a Deputy District Attorney in California (1963)

=== City Attorney ===
- Elizabeth "Babe" King Robinson: First female to become a City Attorney in California (1952)
- Jayne Williams (1974): First African American female to become a City Attorney in California (1986)

=== Political Office ===
- Roberta Achtenberg (1975): First openly LGBT female (a lawyer) appointment to a federal position was confirmed by the U.S. Senate (upon being appointed as the Assistant Secretary of the Fair Housing and Equal Opportunity Office in the U.S. Department of Housing and Urban Development in 1993)
- Sheila Kuehl (1979): First openly LGBT female member of the California legislature (1994)
- Kamala Harris (1989): First female lawyer (and first African American and Indian American female) to serve as a U.S. Senator from California (2017

=== Associations ===
- Joanne M. Garvey (1962): First female to serve on the State Bar of California Board of Governors (1971–1974)
- Patricia Hofstetter: First female to serve as President of the California Judges Association (1976)
- Candace D. Cooper: First African American female to serve as President of the California Judges Association (1988)
- Margaret Mary Morrow (1974): First female to serve as President of the State Bar of California (1993)
- Karen S. Nobumoto (c. 1989): First female of color (African/Asian American descent) to serve as the President of the State Bar of California (2001)
- Holly Fujie (1978): First Asian American (female) to serve as the President of the State Bar of California (2008–2009)

== Firsts in local history ==
=== Northern California ===
- Lillian Sing (1975): First Chinese American female judge in Northern California (1981)

==== Alameda County ====
- Emma Marcuse: First female to graduate from the UC Berkeley School of Law (1906)
- Marguerite Ogden: First female lawyer in Alameda County, California (c. 1913)
- Eloise Cushing (1918): First female lawyer in Oakland, California. She served as the County Librarian for Alameda County Law Library (1910–1957) and ran for a judicial position in 1930.
- Cecil Mosbacher (1934): First female judge in Alameda County, California (1951)
- Jacqueline Taber (1947): First female to serve on the Oakland-Piedmont Municipal Court (1965) [Alameda County, California]
- Judith Ford (1974): First African American female judge in Alameda County, California (1983)
- Phyllis J. Hamilton (1976): First African American (female) to serve as a Commissioner of the Alameda County Superior Court (1985)
- Jayne Williams (1974): First African American female to become the City Attorney in Alameda County, California (1986)
- Peggy Hora (1978): First female judge in Southern Alameda County, California (c. 1983)
- Cecilia Castellanos (1978): First Latino American female judge in Alameda County, California (1997)
- Brenda Harbin-Forte (1979): First African American female appointed as the Presiding Judge of the Alameda County Juvenile Court (2000–2003). She also served as the first African American female President of the Alameda County Bar Association.
- Trina Thompson Stanley (1987): First African American female elected judge in Alameda County, California (2002)
- Jo-Lynne Q. Lee (1978): First Chinese American female to serve on the Alameda County Superior Court (2002)
- Diane Bellas (1981): First female Public Defender of Alameda County, California
- Nancy E. O'Malley (1983): First female to serve as the District Attorney for Alameda County, California (2009)
- Kimberly E. Colwell (1987): First openly LGBT female judge in Alameda County, California (2012)
- Margaret Fujioka (1985): First Japanese American female judge in Alameda County, California (2017)
- Eumi K. Lee (2000): First Korean American female judge in Alameda County, California (2018). She is the first Korean American to serve on the bench.
- Elena Condes: First Latino American lesbian to serve as a judge in Alameda County, California (2021)
- Pamela Y. Price: First African American female to serve as the District Attorney for Alameda County, California (2022)
- Barbara J. Parker: First African American (female) to serve as the Oakland City Attorney, Alameda County, California (2011)

==== Alpine County ====
- Terese Drabec (1983) and Karen Dustman (1983): First females to serve consecutively as the District Attorney for Alpine County, California (2010–2015; 2015–2017). Per available online sources, Colleen E. Hemingway (1992)—who served from 1996 to 1998—may have been the first female District Attorney for Alpine County.

==== Amador County ====
- Gale Cuneo: First female elected as the District Attorney of Amador County, California (1979)
- Susan Harlan (1980): First female judge in Amador County, California (c. 1993)

==== Butte County ====
- Mary King (1915): First female lawyer in Butte County, California
- Ann H. Rutherford (1967): First female judge in Butte County, California (1976)
- Corie J. Caraway: First Asian American (female) judge in Butte County, California (2020)
- Alta Duncan (1916): First female lawyer in Oroville, Butte County, California

==== Calaveras County ====
- Betsy Fitzgerald Rahn (1937): First female lawyer to practice law in Calaveras and San Luis Obispo Counties, California
- Mora Murphy (1981): First female lawyer in Calaveras County, California
- Barbara Yook (1996): First female District Attorney for Calaveras County, California (2010)
- Traci L. Witry (2000): First female judge in Calaveras County, California (2018)

==== Colusa County ====
- Edna Jesse Keeran and Nellis Burtis: First female Justices of the Peace in Colusa County, California (1913 and 1918 respectively)
- Marguerite Ogden: First female lawyer to practice before the Colusa County court (1915)
- Elizabeth “Betsy” Ufkes Olivera (1985): First female judge in Colusa County, California (2010)

==== Contra Costa County ====
- Juliet Lowenthal (1934): First female lawyer in Richmond, Contra Costa County, California
- Lois Bargmann: First female to serve as the Deputy District Attorney of Contra Costa County, California (1955)
- Betsy Fitzgerald Rahn (1937): First female Judge of the Walnut Creek Municipal Court (Contra Costa County, California; 1960s)
- E. Patricia Herron (1965): First female Judge of the Superior Court of Contra Costa County, California (1977)
- Bessie Dreibelbis (1962): First female Judge of the Richmond Municipal Court (Contra Costa County, California; 1970s)
- Ellen James (1970): First female Judge of the Mt. Diablo Judicial District (Contra Costa County, California; 1976)
- Patricia McKinley (1975): First African American female judge in Contra Costa County, California (1982)
- Suzanne Chapot: First female to serve as President of the Contra Costa County Bar Association (1985)
- Barbara Zuñiga (1976): First Hispanic American female judge in Contra Costa County, California (1985)
- Irene Takahashi (1977): First Asian American (female) judge in Contra Costa County, California (1989)
- Sharon Anderson: First female County Counsel in Contra Costa County, California (2009)
- Diana Becton (1986): First female (and African American female) to serve as the District Attorney for Contra Costa County, California (2017)
- Joni Hiramoto (1987): First Asian American (female) Judge of the Superior Court of Contra Costa County, California (1998)

==== Del Norte County ====
- Alyce Moseley: First female municipal court judge for Crescent City, California (1950) [Del Norte County, California]
- Chris Doehle (1991): First female superior court judge in Del Norte County, California (2016)

==== El Dorado County ====
- Jean S. Klotz (1972): First female (lawyer) from El Dorado County to graduate from the McGeorge School of Law in Sacramento, California (1972)
- Suzanne Kingsbury (1982): First female judge (1996) and Presiding Judge (2001) in El Dorado County, California
- Dylan Sullivan: First openly LGBT (female) judge in El Dorado County, California (2014)
- Lisette Suder: First female to serve as the Assistant District Attorney of El Dorado County, California (2022)

==== Glenn County ====
- Margaret Flynn (1937): First female lawyer in Glenn County, California (1939)
- Alicia Ekland (2007): First female to serve on the Superior Court of Glenn County, California (2018)

==== Humboldt County ====
- Elizabeth J. Morrison (1925): First female lawyer in Humboldt County, California
- Marilyn B. Miles (1980):First (Native American) female judge in Humboldt County, California (1998)
- Maggie Fleming (1986): First female District Attorney for Humboldt County, California (2015)

==== Inyo County ====
- Peggy Noland (1962): First female to serve as the President of the Inyo County Bar Association in California (1972)
- Susanne Rizo (2000): First female to serve on Inyo County Superior Court after election (2021)
- Dana Crom: First female District Attorney of Inyo County, California (2025)

==== Lake County ====
- Betty Irwin (1975): First female judge in Lake County, California (1982)
- Susan Krones (1984): First female District Attorney for Lake County, California (2018)
- Shanda Harry (2000): First female elected as a Judge of the Lake County Superior Court, California (2018)

==== Lassen County ====
- Gladys Spencer Burroughs (1898): First female judge in Lassen County, California (1936)
- Paula A. Tennant (1955): First female to serve as the District Attorney for Lassen County, California (c. 1959)
- Michele Verderosa (1996): First female (who later became a judge) to open a law practice in Susanville (2000) [Lassen County, California]

==== Marin County ====
- Genevieve Martinelli (1915): First female prosecutor in Marin County, California (1919)
- Beverly Savitt (1967) and Lynn O'Malley Taylor (1972): First female judges in Marin County, California (1983)
- Paula Kamena (1982): First female District Attorney for Marin County, California (1999)
- Ann Diamond (1937): First female lawyer to serve as President of the Marin County Bar Association (1975)
- Dorothy Chou Proudfoot: First Asian American (female) to serve as the President of the Marin County Bar Association (2017)

==== Mendocino County ====
- Laura Scudder (1918): First female lawyer in Ukiah, California [Mendocino County, California]
- Vivian Lee Rackauckas: First female to serve as the Deputy District Attorney (1977) and District Attorney of Mendocino County, California (1983)
- Cindee F. Mayfield (1984): First female judge in Mendocino County, California (1998)

==== Modoc County ====
- Annette Abbott Adams (1912): One of the first females (who later became a lawyer and a judge) to serve as a school principal in California [upon becoming the Principal of Modoc County High School in 1907]
- Ruth Sorenson: First female lawyer in Modoc County, California. In 1975, she became the first female Deputy District Attorney of Modoc County, California.

==== Mono County ====
- In 2018, Therese M. Hankel, Esq. (1994) launched a campaign to become the first female judge in Mono County, California. She lost the election.

==== Napa County ====
- Elizabeth "Babe" King Robinson: First female lawyer in Napa, California (1929). In 1952, she became the first female City Attorney of Napa. [Napa County, California]
- Terry Davis: First (female) Public Defender of Napa County, California (c. 1987)
- Francisca P. Tisher (1980): First female judge in Napa County, California (1995)
- Elia Ortiz (1999): First Latino American female judge in Napa County, California (2013)
- Monique Langhorne Wilson (2000): First African American female judge in Napa County, California (2019). She was also the first African American (female) Deputy District Attorney in Napa County.
- Allison Haley (2002): First female District Attorney for Napa County, California (2017)

==== Nevada County ====
- June McGlashan: First female lawyer to appear before a Nevada County court (1904)
- Karen Gunderson: First female judge in Nevada County, California (1974)

==== Placer County ====
- June McGlashan: First female lawyer to appear before a Placer County court (1907)
- Lillie M. Laird: First female Justice of the Peace in Placer County, California (1912)
- Gussie Wright Stewart (1915): First female lawyer in Placer County, California. In 1940, she became the first female President of the Placer Bar Association.
- Frances Pearl Rains: First female Justice Court Judge in Foresthill, California [Placer County, California]

==== Plumas County ====
- Sally E. Long: First female Justice of the Peace in Plumas County, California (1935)
- Janet Hilde (1985): First female judge in Plumas County, California (2006)

==== Sacramento County ====
- Valla E. Parkinson (1914): First female lawyer in Sacramento County, California
- Margaret Flynn (1937): First female judge in Sacramento County, California (1964)
- Virginia S. Mueller (1947): First female Deputy District Attorney for Sacramento County, California (1959–1966)
- Frances Newell Carr (1948): First female to serve on the Superior Court of Sacramento, California (1975)
- Alice A. Lytle (1974): First African American female judge in Sacramento County, California (1983)
- Judith Campos: First female to serve as President of the Sacramento County Bar Association (1984)
- Jan Scully (1978): First female District Attorney for Sacramento County, California (1994–2014)
- Windie O. Scott: First minority female to serve as President of the Sacramento County Bar Association (1997)
- Emily E. Vasquez (1977): First Latino American female to serve on the Superior Court of Sacramento, California (2001)
- Shama H. Mesiwala (1998): First South Asian American (female) judge in Sacramento County, California (2017)
- Andi Mudryk: First openly LGBT woman to serve on the Sacramento County Superior Court, California (2022)
- Bunmi O. Awoniyi: First African American (female) to serve as the Presiding Judge of the Sacramento County Superior Court (2023)

==== San Bernardino County ====
- Shahla S. Sabet: First Iranian American judge appointed to the Superior Court of California in the state, serving in San Bernardino County Superior Court (1993)

==== San Francisco (City and County) ====
- Clara Shortridge Foltz (1878): First female lawyer in San Francisco County, California
- Jean de Greayer: First female prosecutor in San Francisco, California (upon her appointment as an assistant prosecutor in 1916)
- Mary Wetmore (1918) and Theresa Meikle (1919): First female judges respectively in San Francisco County, California (1930). Wetmore died one week after assuming office and was followed by Meikle.
- Tabytha Anderson (1933): First African American female lawyer in San Francisco County, California
- Miriam Wolff (1940): First female (a lawyer and judge) to serve as the Director of the Port of San Francisco, California (1970)
- Molly Minudri (1951): First female Deputy Public Defender for San Francisco County, California
- Estella Dooley (1958): First African American female lawyer to work for the San Francisco Public Defender's Office (c. 1970s)
- Joanne M. Garvey (1962): First female to serve as the President of the Bar Association of San Francisco (1981)
- Mary C. Morgan (1972): First openly LGBT female judge in San Francisco County, California (1981)
- Lillian Sing (1975): First Chinese American female judge in San Francisco County, California (1981)
- Teri L. Jackson (1981): First African American female to serve on the San Francisco County Superior Court (2002)
- Therese Stewart (1982): First openly LGBT female to serve as the President of the Bar Association of San Francisco (1999)
- Teresa Caffese: First female to serve as the Chief Attorney for the San Francisco Public Defender's Office (2003)
- Suzanne Bolanos (1989): First Latina American female judge in San Francisco County, California (2003)
- Kamala Harris (1989): First female District Attorney in San Francisco County (2004–2011)
- Kimiko Burton (1990): First female Public Defender for San Francisco County, California (2001)
- Manjari Chawla (2001): First Indian American (female) to serve on the State Bar Court [located in San Francisco] (2018)
- Vedica Puri (1995): First South Asian American (female) judge in San Francisco County, California (2019)
- Brooke Jenkins: First Latino American female to serve as the District Attorney of San Francisco (2022)

==== San Joaquin County ====
- Laura de Force Gordon: First female lawyer in San Joaquin County, California
- Priscilla Hope Haynes (1952): First female judge in San Joaquin County, California (1956). In 1952, she became the first female Deputy District Attorney for San Joaquin County.
- Ann Chargin: First female attorney to work for the Public Defender’s Office of San Joaquin County, California (1964)
- Emily E. Vasquez (1977): First Latino American female lawyer in San Joaquin County, California
- Consuelo María Callahan (1975): First Hispanic American female judge in San Joaquin County, California (1992). She would later become a circuit court judge.
- Robin Appel: First female to serve as a court commissioner for San Joaquin County, California (1995)
- Lauren Thomasson (1989): First African American female judge in San Joaquin County, California (2005)
- Tori Verber Salazar: First female District Attorney for San Joaquin County, California (2015)
- Emma Souza (1980): First female lawyer in Tracy, California [San Joaquin County, California]

==== San Mateo County ====
- Clara Jess and Josephine Lamb: First female Justices of the Peace in San Mateo County, California (1913 and 1924 respectively)
- Elinor Falvey (1927): First female lawyer and Deputy District Attorney (1939) in San Mateo County, California. In 1950, she became the first female President of the San Mateo County Bar Association.
- Margaret Kemp (1972): First female judge in San Mateo County, California (1978)
- Rosemary Pfeiffer (1977): First openly LGBT (female) judge in San Mateo County, California (1991). She was also the first openly LGBT female to serve as the Presiding Judge (2000).
- Nancy Ligon de Ita (1981): First Hispanic American (female) to serve as the President of the San Mateo County Bar Association (c. 2009)
- Elizabeth Lee (1983): First Asian-Pacific American female judge in San Mateo County, California (2005)
- Amarra A. Lee (2006): First African American female to serve on the San Mateo County Superior Court, California (2018)
- Renee Reyna: First Filipino American (female) judge in San Mateo County, California (2019)

==== Santa Clara County ====
- Clara Shortridge Foltz (1878): First female lawyer in Santa Clara County, California
- Isabel Charles: First female Justice of the Peace in Santa Clara County, California (1917)
- Miriam E. Wolff (1940): First female appointed as a municipal court judge in Santa Clara County, California (1975)
- Marilyn Pestarino Zecher (1957): First female judge in Santa Clara County, California
- Rose Bird (1966): First female Deputy Public Defender for Santa Clara County, California (1967–1974)
- Virginia Mae Days (1934): First Latino American female to serve as a Judge of the Santa Clara County Municipal Court (1981–1984). She was also the first Latino American female to serve as a Judge of the Superior Court of Santa Clara County (1984–2004).
- Marilyn Morgan: First female to serve as President of the Santa Clara County Bar Association (1985)
- LaDoris Cordell (1975): First African American (female) to serve on the Santa Clara County Superior Court (1988)
- Rolanda Pierre Dixon: First African American (female) to serve as an Assistant District Attorney for Santa Clara County, California
- Ann Ravel (1974): First female named as the Santa Clara County Counsel (1998)
- Erica Yew: First Asian American female to serve on the Superior Court of Santa Clara County, California (2001)
- Julie Emede: First openly LGBT female to serve as the President of the Santa Clara County Bar Association
- Dolores Carr (1980): First female District Attorney for Santa Clara County, California (2006)
- Mary Greenwood (1981): First female Public Defender for Santa Clara County, California (2005)
- Risë Jones Pichon (1976): First African American female (and minority overall) to serve as the Presiding Judge of the Superior Court of Santa Clara County, California (2015)
- Nahal Iravani-Sani (1993): First Iranian American female judge in Santa Clara County, California (2017)
- Audra Ibarra (1995): First Filipino American (female) judge in Santa Clara County, California (2018)
- Elvira Robinson (1976): First Latino American female to serve as the Deputy District Attorney in Santa Clara County, California
- Golnesa Monazamfar: First Iranian American (female) President of the Santa Clara County Bar Association (2025)

==== Santa Cruz County ====
- Lucy Underwood McCann (1894): First female lawyer in Santa Cruz County, California
- June Schnacke: First female to serve as a District Attorney for Santa Cruz County, California (1947)
- Heather Morse (1981): First female judge in Santa Cruz County, California
- Sara Clarenbach (1974): First female to serve as President of the Santa Cruz County Bar Association (1982)
- Kathleen Akao (1982): First Asian American female elected as a judge in Santa Cruz County, California (1994)
- Nancy de la Peña: First Latino American female and openly lesbian judge in Santa Cruz County, California (2020)
- Heather Rogers: First female Public Defender for Santa Cruz County, California
- Leila Sayer: First Iranian American (female) judge in Santa Cruz County, California (2023)

==== Shasta County ====
- Ethel C. Blair: First female Justice of the Peace in Shasta County, California (1918)
- Ferol E. Thorpe (1938): First female lawyer in Redding, Shasta County, California
- Elnora (E.) Beth Livezey (1971): First lawyer (and female) to serve as a Commissioner for Shasta County Superior Court, California (1989)
- Stephanie Bridgett (2001): First female Assistant District Attorney (2015) and District Attorney (2017) for Shasta County, California
- Diane Ortiz: First Latino American female to serve as a Deputy District Attorney in Shasta and Yolo Counties, California

==== Sierra County ====
- Yvette Durant (1997): First female judge in Sierra County, California (2016)

==== Siskiyou County ====
- Ruth Markon: First female Justice of the Peace in Siskiyou County, California (1947)
- Jane L. (Skanderup) Edwards (1953): First female to serve as the District Attorney for Siskiyou County, California (1971–1974)
- Karen L. Dixon: First female elected as a judge in Siskiyou County, California (2009)

==== Solano County ====
- Marian Randall (née Leachman) (1940): First female lawyer in Solano County, California
- Ruth Yatsie and Georgia H. Crowley: First female judicial officers respectively in Solano County, California. Yatsie was appointed a police judge in 1940 and Crowley a Justice of the Peace in 1943.
- Jean E. Simpson (née Morris) (1950): First female lawyer (who was a lieutenant) to be assigned to Travis Air Force Base in Fairfield, California (1951) [Solano County, California]
- Rosalie M. Woods: First female prosecutor in Solano County (upon joining the Solano County District Attorney's Office)
- Mary Ann Winters: First female to serve as the President of the Solano County Bar Association (1973)
- Krisida W. Jones (1974): First African American (female) to serve as a Deputy City Attorney for Vallejo (1982)
- Barbara James (1973): First female commissioner in Solano County, California (1989)
- Lorraine Voss (1978): First (female) director of the then newly created Conflict Defender’s Office of Solano County (1990)
- Ramona Garrett (1980): First African American (female) judge in Solano County, California (upon her appointment as a municipal court judge in 1992). In 1986, she became the first African American (female) to serve as the Chief Deputy District Attorney of Solano County.
- Cynda Unger (1983): First female elected as a Judge of the Solano County Superior Court (2000)
- Donna Stashyn (1991): First female judicial officer at the Vallejo branch of the Solano County Superior Court (upon becoming a commissioner in 2005)
- Lesli Caldwell (1979): First female Public Defender of Solano County (2010)
- Claudia Quintana (1995): First Latino American female to become the City Attorney for Vallejo, California [Solano County, California]
- Krishna Abrams (1993): First female District Attorney of Solano County (2014)
- Dora M. Rios (1999): First Latino American female Judge of the Solano County Superior Court (2017)
- Bernadette Curry (1998): First female to serve as the County Counsel for Solano County (2019)
- Marlo Nisperos (2005): First Filipino American (female) appointed as a Judge of the Solano County Superior Court (2024)
- Kelly Trujillo (2018): First Latino American female to serve as the President of the Solano County Bar Association

==== Sonoma County ====
- Luda Fulkerson Barham and Frances McG Martin (1895): First female lawyers in Sonoma County, California
- Ellen Fleming: First female Justice of the Peace in Sonoma County, California (c. 1942)
- Gayle Guynup (1976): First female judge in Sonoma County, California (1983)
- Cerena Wong: First minority female (who is of Asian descent) judge in Sonoma County, California (1985)
- Elaine Malisch Rushing: First female to serve on the Superior Court of Sonoma County (1992)
- Virginia Marcoida (1977): First Latino American female to serve on the Sonoma County Superior Court (2008)
- Jill Ravitch (1987): First female District Attorney for Sonoma County, California (2011)
- Kathleen Pozzi (1987): First female Public Defender for Sonoma County, California (2013)
- Barbara Phelan (1987): First openly LGBT female to serve on the Sonoma County Superior Court (2018)
- Deanna Beeler (1976): First female lawyer in Healdsburg, Sonoma County, California

==== Sutter County ====
- Susan Green (1995): First female judge in Sutter County, California (2009)
- Amanda Hopper (2004): First female District Attorney for Sutter County, California (2014)

==== Tehama County ====
- Leanore Randall (1927): First female lawyer in Tehama County, California
- Christine McGuire: First female prosecutor in Tehama County, California (c. 1980s)
- Lisa Muto (1989): First female lawyer to run as a judicial candidate in Tehama County, California (2010)
- Laura S. Woods (1995): First female judge in Tehama County, California (2017)

==== Trinity County ====
- Elizabeth "Liz" Johnson (1992): First female judge in Trinity County, California (2013)
- Megan Marshall and Donna Daly: First females to serve as the District Attorney for Trinity County on an interim and permanent basis respectively (2018)

==== Yolo County ====
- Martha A. Adams: First female lawyer to practice before Yolo County Superior Court (1917)
- Gloria Megino Ochoa (1976): First Filipino American female to graduate from the UC Davis School of Law [Yolo County, California]
- Donna Petre (1976): First female judge in Yolo County, California (c. 1987)
- Sonia Cortés (1997): First Latino American female to serve as a judge (2015) and Presiding Judge-elect (2027) in Yolo County, California
- Tracie Olson (1997): First female Public Defender of Yolo County, California (2009)
- Diane Ortiz: First Latino American female to serve as a Deputy District Attorney in Shasta and Yolo Counties, California

==== Yuba County ====
- Kathleen O'Connor (1973): First female judge in Yuba County, California (2002)

=== Central California ===
==== Fresno County ====
- Mary Barton: First female Justice of the Peace in Fresno County, California (1921)
- Myrtle M. Burgess (1950): First female lawyer in Fresno County, California
- Annette LaRue: First female judge in Fresno County, California (1976)
- Pauline Hanson (1946): First female to serve on the Fresno County Superior Court (1979)
- Judith Leslie Soley (1971): First female to serve as the President of the Fresno County Bar Association (1986)
- Hilary A. Chittick (1979): First female to serve as the Presiding Judge of the Fresno County Superior Court (2007)
- Susan B. Andersen (1987): First female (an attorney) to serve in a countywide position (1990)
- Jane Cardoza (1981): First Hispanic American female elected to serve on the Fresno County Superior Court (1996)
- Glenda Allen-Hill (1983): First African American female judge in Fresno County, California (2008)
- Elizabeth Diaz (1990): First female Public Defender for Fresno County, California (2014)
- Elizabeth Egan (1995): First female District Attorney for Fresno County, California (2003)
- Pahoua C. Lor (2009): First Asian American female (of Hmong descent) judge in Fresno County, California (2022)

==== Kings County ====
- Glenda Doan: First female to serve as a prosecutor and judge in Kings County, California. She was also the first female President of the Kings County Bar Association.
- Colleen Carlson (1999): First female to lead the Office of County Counsel in Kings County, California (2010)
- Tonya Lee (2000): First female to serve as the Deputy District Attorney in Kings County, California (2013)

==== Madera County ====
- Marcia Putney: First female judge in Madera County, California (1945)
- Sally Moreno (1995): First female District Attorney for Madera County, California (2018)

==== Mariposa County ====
- Barbara K. Shea: First female Justice of the Peace in Mariposa County, California (1918)
- Anita Starchman Bryant: First female to serve as a Judge of the Superior Court of Mariposa County (2022)

==== Merced County ====
- Enid Childs (1918): First female lawyer to practice before the court in Merced County, California (1919)
- Flossie Lobo: First female to be elected judge in Merced County, California (c. 1950)
- Angil Morris-Jones (1978): First African American female judge in Merced County, California (1997)
- Betty L. Dawson: First female to serve as the Presiding Judge of Merced County Superior Court (2002)
- Nicole Silveira: First female to serve as the Supervising Deputy District Attorney for Merced County, California (2016)
- Kimberly Reitz Helms Lewis (1997): First female elected District Attorney for Merced County, California (2018)
- Monika Saini Donabed: First Indian American and South Asian female judge in Merced County, California (2025)

==== Monterey County ====
- Elizabeth “Petie” Haggood Helfrich (1959) and Patricia Lane (1959): First female lawyers in Monterey County, California (respectively in Salinas and Carmel). Around 1987, Helfrich became the first female to serve as President of the Monterey County Bar Association.
- Wendy Clark Duffy (1977): First female judge in Monterey County, California (1989)
- Marla O. Anderson (1986): First African American female to become a Judge of the Monterey County Superior Court (1995)
- Lydia Villarreal: First Latino American female judge in Monterey County, California (2001)
- Jeannine Pacioni (1990): First female to serve as the District Attorney for Monterey County, California (2019)
- Susan Chapman (1986): Monterey County Public Defender, County of Monterey and the first woman to hold this position (2017)

==== San Benito County ====
- Grace House and Lorena Johnson: First female Justices of the Peace in San Benito County, California (1921 and c. 1947 respectively)
- Jean Flanagan: First female lawyer in San Benito County, California (upon opening her own law practice in Hollister in 1975)
- Candace Hooper: First female to serve as the District Attorney for San Benito County, California (2006)

==== Stanislaus County ====
- Sarah E. Forbes: First female Justice of the Peace in Stanislaus County, California (1912)
- Esto Bates Broughton (1916): First female lawyer in Stanislaus County, California
- Ann Veneman (1976): First female to serve as the Deputy Public Defender in Stanislaus County, California (1978)
- Susan D. Siefken: First female to serve as the President of the Stanislaus County Bar Association (1989)
- Birgit Fladager (1986): First elected female District Attorney of Stanislaus County, California (2006)
- Dawna Frenchie Reeves (1995): First African American (female) judge in Stanislaus County, California (2008)
- Maria Elena Ramos Ratliff: First Hispanic American female to serve as a Judge of the Stanislaus County Superior Court (2023)

==== Tulare County ====
- Katherine Bingham: First female Justice of the Peace in Tulare County, California (1914)
- Anna White Garlund (1944): First female lawyer in Tulare County, California. She later became the first female President of the Tulare County Bar Association.
- Lita Blatner: First female lawyer to work for the County Counsel of Tulare County (c. 1972)
- Melinda M. Reed (1979) and Elisabeth B. Krant-Latronico (1980): Per available sources, the first females to serve respectively as municipal court judges in Tulare County, California (1993–1995). They would both later become superior court judges in 1998.
- Lisa Bertolino (1988): First female Public Defender for Tulare County, California (2014)

==== Tuolumne County ====
- Eleanor Provost (1976): First female to serve as the Deputy District Attorney for Tuolumne County, California (1977–1982). She later became a judge.
- Cherie Spitze (1994): First female President of the Tuolumne County Bar Association (2015)

=== Southern California ===
- Betty Tom Chu (1961): First Chinese American female lawyer in Southern California
- Denise de Bellefeuille (1981): First female judge on the South Coast in California (c. 1993)

==== Imperial County ====
- Alice Jones: First female lawyer to address a jury before the Imperial County court (1935)
- Annie M. Gutierrez (1972): First female (and Latino American female) judge in Imperial County, California (2002)
- Diane Altamirano (1977): First female to serve as the Presiding Judge for the Superior Court of Imperial County, California (2018)
- Katherine Kmiec Turner (2007): First female County Counsel for Imperial County, California (2015)

==== Kern County ====
- K.S. Miller: First female Justice of the Peace in Kern County, California (1918)
- Ellen Miller (1936): First female judge in Kern County, California (1957). She is reputed to be the first female lawyer in Bakersfield, California. [Kern County, California]
- Sueellen Anderson: First female to serve as President of the Kern County Bar Association (c. 1992)
- Andrea Kohler: First female to serve as the Assistant District Attorney for Kern County, California
- Lisa Green (1983): First female to serve as the District Attorney for Kern County, California (2010)
- Raymonda Burnham (1996): First female public defender and criminal defense lawyer to be appointed a Judge of the Kern County Superior Court (2008)
- Gloria J. Cannon (1996): First African American female judge in Kern County, California (2017)
- Pam Singh (2004): First female Public Defender for Kern County, California (2017)
- Cynthia Zimmer: First female elected as the District Attorney for Kern County, California (2018)
- Judith K. Dulcich (1990) and Colette M. Humphrey (1984): First females to serve simultaneously as the Presiding Judge and Assistant Presiding Judge respectively for Kern County Superior Court (2019)
- Wendy L. Avila: First Latino American female judge in Kern County, California (2021)
- Alekxia Torres-Stallings (2014): First Latino American female to serve as the President of the Kern County Bar Association (2021). Torres-Stalling and her father David A. Torres are the first father and daughter to have served as county bar president.
- Navraj Rai: First Sikh (female) judge pro tem in Kern County, California (2026)
- Ruth E. Cooper (1964): First female lawyer in Ridgecrest, California

==== Los Angeles County ====
- Clara Shortridge Foltz (1878): First female Deputy District Attorney for Los Angeles County, California (1910)
- Elizabeth Kenney (1897): First female lawyer in Los Angeles, California [Los Angeles County, California]
- Orfa Jean Shontz (1913): First female referee of the Juvenile Court of Los Angeles County, California (1915–1920)
- Georgia Bullock (1913): First female judge in Los Angeles County, California (1931)
- May Darlington Lahey (1914): First female (who was Australian) to serve as the Presiding Judge of the Los Angeles Municipal Court (c. 1943)
- Mabel Walker Willebrandt (1917): First female Public Defender of Los Angeles County, California (c. 1920s)
- Vaino Spencer (1952): First African American female judge in Los Angeles County, California (1961)
- Marion L. Obera (1962): First African American female to serve as a Deputy District Attorney in California (1963)
- Consuelo B. Marshall (1962): First female (and African American female) to work in the City Attorney's Office for Los Angeles (1962)
- Patricia Phillips (1968): First female to serve as the President of the Los Angeles County Bar Association, California (1984)
- Ramona Perez (1972): First Latino American female judge in Los Angeles County, California (1985)
- Maxine F. Thomas (1972): First African American female appointed as a Presiding Judge of Los Angeles Municipal Court (1987)
- Miriam Krinsky: First (female) lawyer from the public sector to serve as the President of the Los Angeles County Bar Association, California (2002)
- Jacqueline Nguyen (1991): First Vietnamese American female judge in Los Angeles County, California (2002)
- Lee S. Edmon: First female to serve as the Assistant Presiding Judge (2009–2010) and Presiding Judge (2011–2012) of Los Angeles County Superior Court
- Rupa Goswami (1998): First South Asian American female judge in Los Angeles County, California (2013)
- Carol L. Newman (1979): First openly LGBT female to serve as the San Fernando Valley Bar Association, Los Angeles County, California (2015)
- Jackie Lacey (1982): First female (and African American female) District Attorney for Los Angeles County, California (2012)
- Amy Ashvanian: First Armenian-born (female) judge in Los Angeles County, California (2018)
- Maria Rohaidy (1989): First Hispanic American (female) to serve as the President of the Long Beach Bar Association, Los Angeles County, California (2009)
- Linda L. Sun: [500] First Chinese American female to be elected as the Los Angeles County Superior Court Judge (2020)
- Hydee Feldstein Soto: First (Latino American) female to serve as the Los Angeles City Attorney (2021)
- Holly Hancock: First African American (female) public defender elected as a Judge of the Los Angeles County Superior Court (2022)
- Oda Faulconer (1925): First female lawyer in San Fernando, Los Angeles County, California
- Elsie M. Farris (1927): First female lawyer in Long Beach, Los Angeles County, California
- Gloria Reed (1968): First female lawyer in Eagle Rock, Los Angeles County, California

==== Orange County ====
- Clara Cushman (1922): First female lawyer in Orange County, California
- Celia Young Baker (1948): First female judge in Orange County, California (1948)
- Betty Lou Lamoreaux (1957): First female to serve on the Superior Court of Orange County, California (1976)
- Alicemarie Stotler (1967): First female to serve as a Deputy District Attorney in Orange County, California
- Frances Munoz (1972): First Latino American (female) lawyer hired by the Public Defender's Office in Orange County, California
- Heidi Mueller (1975): First female lawyer to practice criminal defense full-time in Orange County, California (1977)
- Jennifer King: First female to serve as President of the Orange County Bar Association (1990)
- Karen Robinson (1989): First African American female judge in Orange County, California (2003)
- Cristina L. Talley (1982): First Latino American female to become the City Attorney for Anaheim, California [Orange County, California] (2009)
- Sheila Hanson (1989): First Iranian American (female) judge in Orange County, California (2006)
- Lei Lei Wang Ekvall (1992): First Asian American female to serve as the President of the Orange County Bar Association (2010)
- Elia Naqvi: First Muslim American (female) judge in Orange County, California (2024)
- Sonia Rubio Carvalho: First Hispanic American female to serve as the City Attorney of Santa Ana, Orange County, California (2012)

==== Riverside County ====
- Mary McFarland Hall (1934): Reputed to be the first female lawyer in Riverside County, California
- May Stobbs: First female judicial officer in Riverside County, California (1949)
- Sue Steding: First female to serve as the Assistant District Attorney (1987) and Chief Assistant District Attorney (2007) of Riverside County, California. She was considered the first female prosecutor in the desert region of Indio and Palm Springs in 1976.
- Janice McIntyre (1975): First female judge in Riverside County, California (1981)
- Janet Wall Williams: First female to serve as President of the Riverside County Bar Association (1985)
- Irma Poole Asberry (1979): First African American female judge in Riverside County, California (2007)
- Raquel A. Marquez-Britsch (1991): First Latino American female judge in Riverside County, California (2011) and San Bernardino County, California
- Susanne Cho (1993): First Korean American female judge in Riverside County, California (2014)
- Sunshine Sykes (2002): First Native American (Navajo) female judge in Riverside County, California (2013)

==== San Bernardino County ====
- Eliza K. Murphy: First female Justice of the Peace in San Bernardino County, California (1926)
- Grace Storey Merlo: First female Deputy Public Defender for San Bernardino County, California (c. 1957)
- Margaret J. Morris (1953): First female judge in San Bernardino County, California (1963)
- Katrina West (1990); First African American (female) to serve on the San Bernardino County Superior Court (2001)
- Raquel A. Marquez-Britsch (1991): First Latino American female judge in Riverside County, California (2011) and San Bernardino County, California
- Doreen Boxer (1993): First female Public Defender for San Bernardino County, California (2006–2010)
- Lily L. Sinfield (1998): First Asian-Pacific Islander female judge in San Bernardino County, California (2012)
- Phyllis Morris: First African American (female) Public Defender for San Bernardino County, California (2012)
- Candice Garcia-Rodrigo: First Latino American female elected judge in San Bernardino County, California (2021)
- Malalai Farooqi: First Afghan American (female) judge in San Bernardino County, California (2026)
- Marianne D. Isaeff: First female lawyer in Redlands, San Bernardino County, California

==== San Diego County ====
- Clara Shortridge Foltz (1878): First female lawyer in San Diego County, California
- Miriam E. Rains: First female Justice of the Peace in San Diego County, California (c. 1915)
- Madge Bradley (1933): First female judge in San Diego County, California (1953)
- Patricia A. Yim Cowett (1972): First Chinese American female judge in San Diego County, California (1979)
- Elizabeth Riggs (1974): First African American female judge in San Diego County, California (1979)
- Randa Trapp: First African American (female) judge to serve in the Civil Division and as its Supervising Judge
- Melinda Lasatar (1973): First female to serve as the President of the San Diego County Bar Association (1985)
- Lillian Lim: First Filipino American female judge in San Diego County, California (1986)
- Irma Elsa Gonzalez: First Latino American female judge in San Diego County, California (1991)
- Bonnie Dumanis (1977): First Jewish and openly LGBT female District Attorney of San Diego [San Diego County, California] (2003)
- Tamila Ebrahimi Ipema: First Iranian American (female) judge in San Diego County, California (2009)
- Mara Elliott (1994): First Latina American female lawyer elected as City Attorney for San Diego, California (2016)
- Truc T. Do (1997): First Vietnamese American (female) judge in San Diego County, California (2018)
- Marcella "Marcy" McLaughlin (1999): First Latina American female to serve as the President of the San Diego County Bar Association (c. 2013)
- Marguerite Falkenborg (1955): First female lawyer in Chula Vista, San Diego County, California
- Anna VonSeggern Engle: First female lawyer in Escondido, San Diego County, California
- Mary Gell: First female to serve as a municipal court judge for the South Bay Judicial District, San Diego County, California (1975)

==== San Luis Obispo County ====
- Minnie Penn: First female Justice of the Peace in San Luis Obispo County, California (1916)
- Betsy Fitzgerald Rahn (1937): First female lawyer to practice law in Calaveras and San Luis Obispo Counties, California
- Teresa Estrada-Mullaney (1979): First female (and Latino American female) Deputy District Attorney and judge in San Luis Obispo County, California (1981 and 1992, respectively)
- Patricia Ashbaugh: First female Public Defender for San Luis Obispo County, California

==== Santa Barbara County ====
- Alice Merenbach: First female prosecutor in the Child Support Division of Santa Barbara County, California (1966)
- Deborah Talmage (1976): First female commissioner in Santa Barbara County, California (1983)
- Barbara J. Beck (1974): First female judge in Santa Barbara County, California (1985)
- Christie Stanley (1978): First female to serve as the District Attorney for Santa Barbara County, California (2006)
- Von T. Nguyen Deroian (2006): First Asian-Pacific Islander (female) judge in Santa Barbara County, California (2018). In 2006, she became the first Asian American (female) Deputy District Attorney of Santa Barbara County.
- Denise Hippach: First African American (female) judge in Santa Barbara County, California (2022)
- Kay Kuns: First female lawyer from Santa Ynez Valley to become a Judge of the Superior Court of Santa Barbara (2009)
- Patricia L. Kelly: First female to serve as the Presiding Judge of the Superior Court of Santa Barbara County, California (2017–2018)
- Elizabeth Diaz: First Hispanic American (female) to serve as the President of the Santa Barbara County Bar Association (2020). In 2024, she became the first Mexican American female to serve as a Court Commissioner of Santa Barbara Superior Court.

==== Ventura County ====
- Mary Belle Spencer: First female lawyer to lead a murder defense in Ventura County, California (1924)
- Alice Titus Magill (1908): First female lawyer in Ventura County, California (1938)
- Margaret Keller: First female to serve as President of the Ventura County Bar Association (1965)
- Melinda Johnson (1972): First female judge (1982) and Presiding Judge (1993) in Ventura County, California
- Michele M. Castillo (2002): First Latino American/Filipino American female judge in Ventura County, California (2016)
- Claudia Bautista: First [Latino American] female to serve as the Public Defender for Ventura County, California (2020)

== See also ==
- List of first women lawyers and judges in the United States
- Timeline of women lawyers in the United States
- Women in law

== Other topics of interest ==
- List of first minority male lawyers and judges in the United States
- List of first minority male lawyers and judges in California
