= Abinanti =

Abinanti is a surname. Notable people with the surname include:

- Abby Abinanti (born 1947), American lawyer
- Thomas J. Abinanti (born 1946), American politician and lawyer

== See also ==
- Abitanti
