= Lumb =

Lumb may refer to

== Places ==
- Lumb, Edenfield, a village in Rossendale district, Lancashire, England; see List of United Kingdom locations: Lu-Ly
- Lumb, Rawtenstall, a village in Rossendale district, Lancashire, England
- Lumb, West Yorkshire, a village near Huddersfield, England; see List of United Kingdom locations: Lu-Ly

== People ==
- Edward Lumb (fl. 1872–1886), first class cricketer
- Jane Lumb (1942–2008), British fashion model and actress
- Jean B. Lumb, CM (1919–2002), Canadian activist
- Margot Lumb (1912–1998, English professional squash player
- Michael Lumb (footballer) (born 1988), Danish footballer
- Michael Lumb (cricketer) (born 1980), English cricketer
- Richard Lumb (born 1950), Yorkshire cricketer
- Kieran Lumb, Canadian middle- and long-distance runner
