= Annette Abbott Adams =

American lawyer and judge (1877–1956)

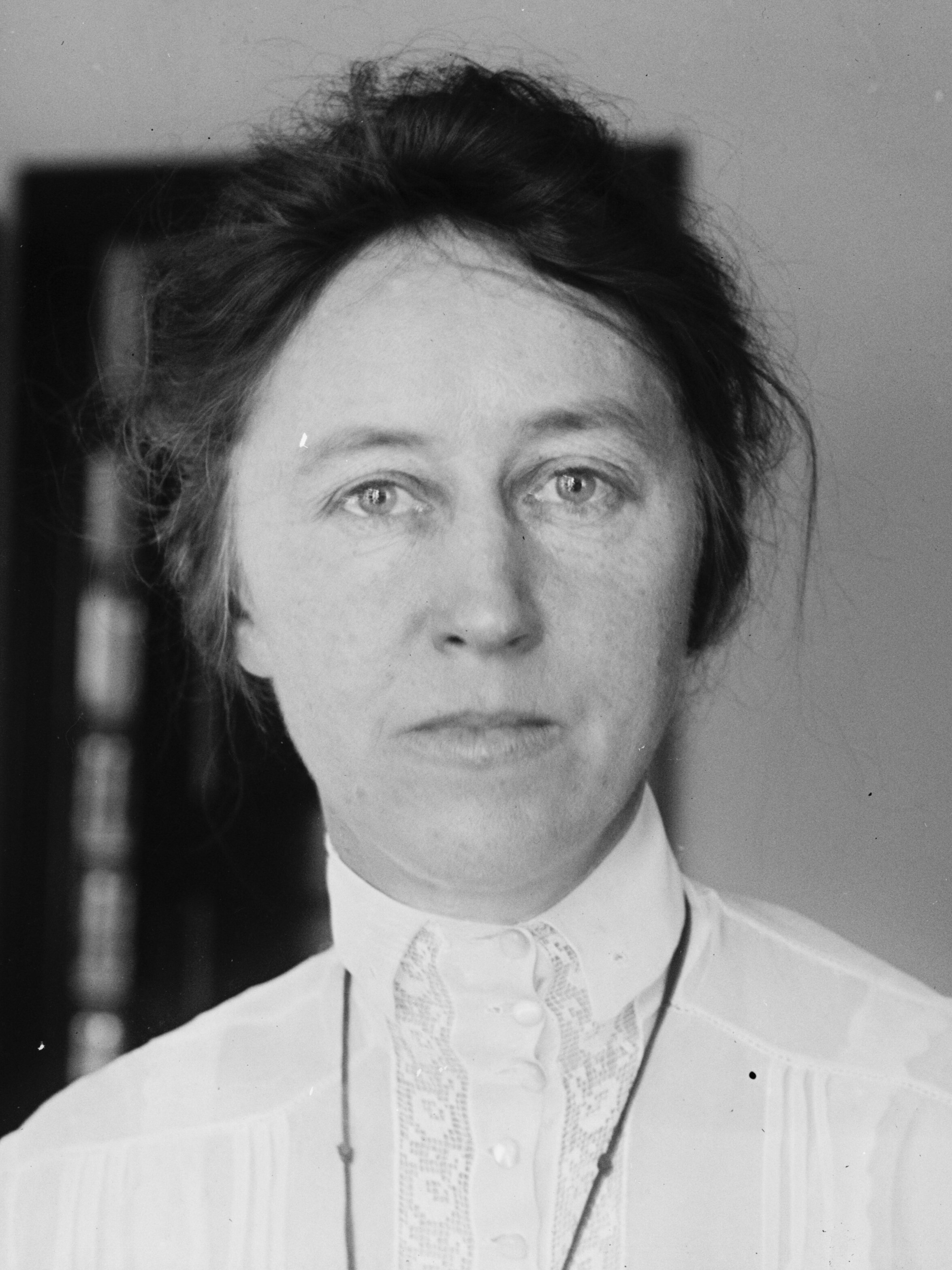
- Adams in 1920

Presiding Justice of the California Court of Appeal, Third District
- In office March 30, 1942 – November 30, 1952
- Appointed by: Culbert Olson

United States Assistant Attorney General
- In office May 29, 1920 – August 1, 1921
- President: Woodrow Wilson
- Preceded by: William L. Frierson
- Succeeded by: Mabel Walker Willebrandt

Assistant United States Attorney for the Northern District of California
- In office September 28, 1914 – May 29, 1920
- President: Woodrow Wilson

Personal details
- Born: Annette Grace Abbott; March 12, 1877 Prattville, California, U.S.
- Died: October 26, 1956 (aged 79) Sacramento, California, U.S.
- Spouse: Martin Houston Adams (m. 1906)
- Parent(s): Hiram Brown Abbott; Annette Frances Stubbs
- Education: Chico State Normal School; University of California, Berkeley
- Occupation: Lawyer; Judge
- Known for: First female United States Assistant Attorney General
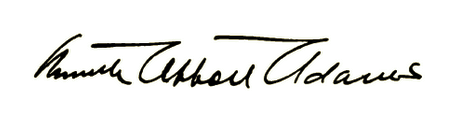
- Signature

Annette Abbott Adams (March 12, 1877 – October 26, 1956) was an American lawyer and judge. She was the first woman to be the Assistant Attorney General in the United States.

== Early life and education ==
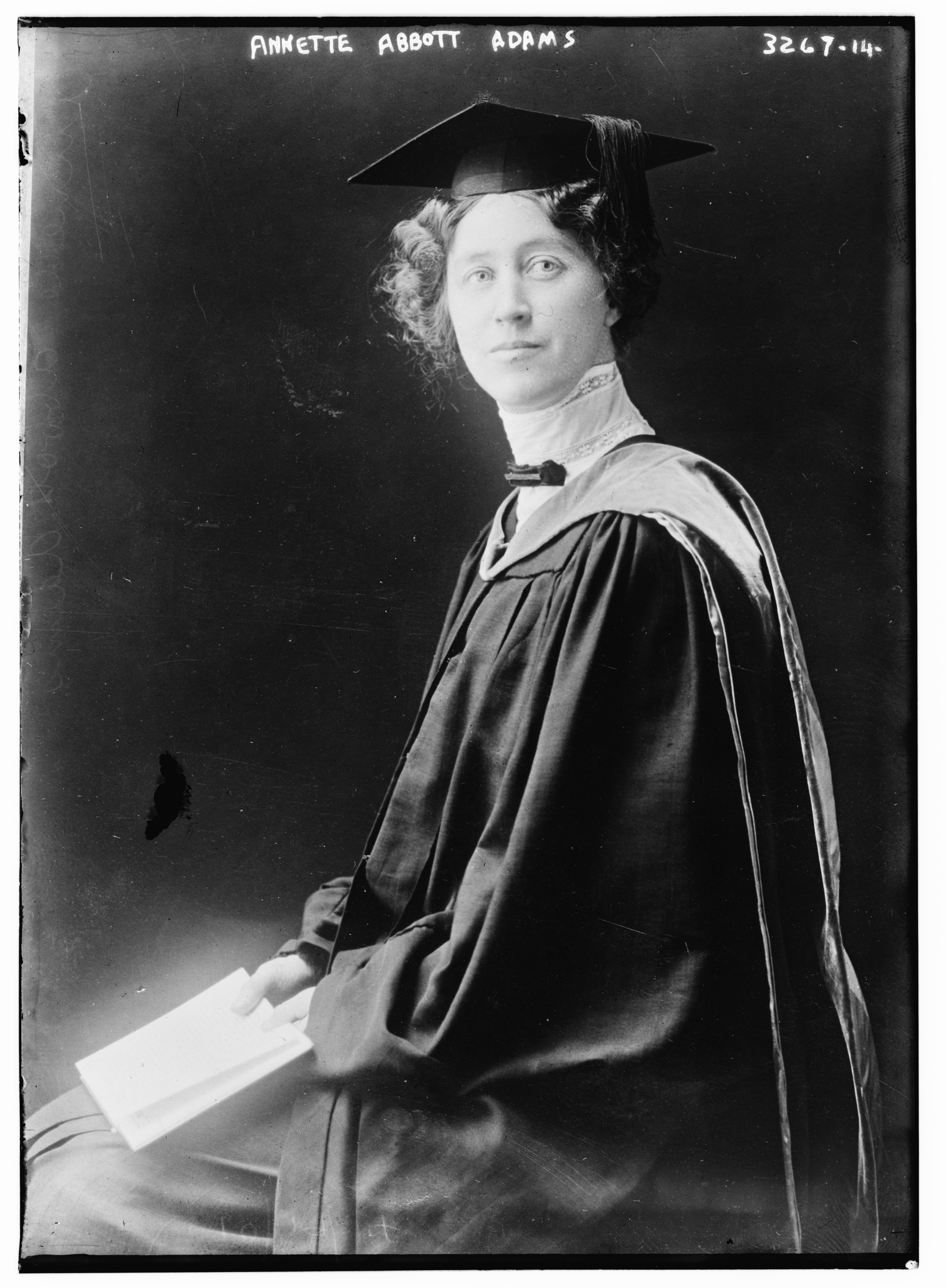
Adams in her graduation robes c. 1912

Born Annette Grace Abbott in Prattville, California, to storekeeper Hiram Brown Abbott and teacher Annette Frances Stubbs, Adams was educated at Chico State Normal School and the University of California, Berkeley, where she obtained her undergraduate degree in 1904, and her law degree in 1912. She was a member of Delta Delta Delta.

== Career ==
Before beginning her legal career, she taught grammar school and was one of the first female school principals in California, at Modoc County High School in Alturas.

In 1912, she was admitted to the State Bar of California. She campaigned for Woodrow Wilson in California, and was rewarded after his election with an appointment as an Assistant United States Attorney in the Northern District of California, 1914–1919. In 1918–1920, she was the assistant United States Attorney in the same district. In 1920, she was appointed as the first female Assistant Attorney General of the United States, an office which she resigned in 1921.

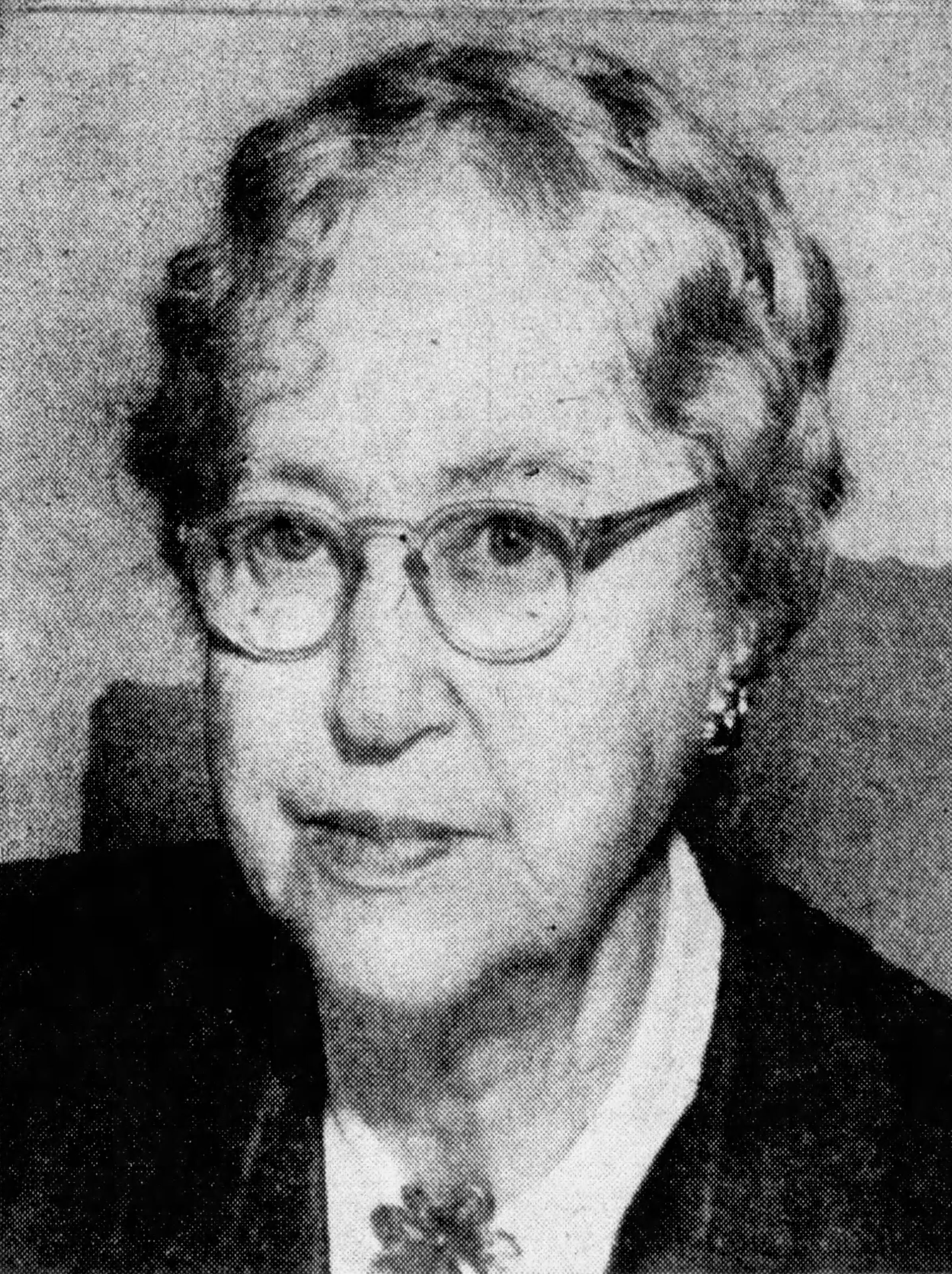
Adams c. 1950

Adams ran unsuccessfully for a seat on the San Francisco Board of Supervisors in 1923. She had a successful private law practice until 1935, when she was appointed Assistant Special Counsel of U.S. Oil litigation. In 1942, California Governor Culbert Olson appointed her as Presiding Justice of the California Court of Appeal for the Third District in Sacramento. That court was, at the time, one of four intermediate appellate courts in California—intermediate, that is, between the trial courts located in every county, and the California Supreme Court. As the Presiding Justice for the Third District, Justice Adams was thus one of the four highest-ranking judges in the state after the Justices of the Supreme Court. She won election to a twelve-year term on the court of appeal later in 1942, but retired in 1952 for health reasons. In her time on the court, she wrote over 350 opinions. In 1950, she served by special assignment on one case in the California Supreme Court, becoming the first woman to sit on that court (Gardner v. Jonathon Club (1950) 35 Cal.2d 343).

Adams died in Sacramento on October 26, 1956.

== Personal life ==
On August 13, 1906, Annette Abbott married Martin Houston "Mart" Adams, with the service performed by Judge J.D. Goodwin of Plumas County. Mr. Adams was two years younger than Mrs. Adams. Friends say they married primarily because Annette wanted a "Mrs." in front of her name. Although they lived apart, they never divorced.

== See also ==
- List of first women lawyers and judges in California

== Sources ==
- American National Biography, vol. I, pp. 66–67.
- Annette Abbott Adams (March 12, 1877 – October 26, 1956)
- "Girl" Lawyer Makes Good: The Story of Annette Abbott Adams by Joey Dean Horton
- Annette Abbott Adams: California's First Lady of Law by Louise E. Steiner (1972)
- Harris, Gloria G.; Cohen, Hannah S. (2012). "7. Lawyers – Annette Abbott Adams: First Woman Assistant Attorney General". Women Trailblazers of California: Pioneers to the Present. Charleston, SC: The History Press. pp. 108–121 [110–11]. ISBN 978-1609496753.
