= Vaino Spencer =

American judge

Presiding Justice of the California Court of Appeal, Second District, Division One
- In office August 19, 1980 – August 31, 2007
- Appointed by: Governor Jerry Brown

Personal details
- Born: July 22, 1920 Los Angeles, California, U.S.
- Died: October 25, 2016 (aged 96) Los Angeles, California, U.S.
- Spouse: Lorenzo V. Spencer
- Education: Polytechnic High School
- Alma mater: Los Angeles City College; Southwestern Law School
- Profession: Lawyer, judge
- Known for: First African-American woman appointed to a judgeship in California

Vaino Hassan Spencer (July 22, 1920 – October 25, 2016) was an American judge, the first African-American woman appointed to a judgeship in California. She co-founded the Black Women Lawyers Association in 1975, and the National Association of Women Judges in 1979.

== Early life and education ==
Vaino Hassan was born in 1920, in Los Angeles. As a teenager, she appeared as a dancer in a Laurel and Hardy movie, Bonnie Scotland (1935), along with her father, Abdul Hassan.

She graduated from Polytechnic High School in 1938, attended Los Angeles City College as an undergraduate, and earned a law degree from Southwestern Law School in 1952. She was the third African-American woman admitted to the California bar. Before her law degree, she held a real estate license, and worked in that business.

== Career ==
Vaino Hassan Spencer practiced as a lawyer in Los Angeles. In 1961 she was appointed as a municipal court judge in Los Angeles, the first black woman in California appointed to a judgeship. In 1976, she became a Los Angeles County Superior Court Judge, and in 1980 she was named a Presiding Judge of the California Court of Appeal, Second Appellate District, Division One. She retired in 2007 as "one of the longest-serving judges in California history."

== Personal life and legacy ==
Vaino Hassan married real estate agent Lorenzo V. Spencer. They divorced in 1967.

The National Association of Women Judges annually presents the Justice Vaino Spencer Leadership Award for outstanding leadership.

Spencer died on October 25, 2016, at her home in Los Angeles.

== See also ==
- List of African-American jurists
- List of first women lawyers and judges in California
