= Christine la Barraque =

French-born American soprano and advocate

Christine Blanche la Barraque (July 16, 1868 or 1873 — February 10, 1961) was a French-born American soprano and advocate for blind education and employment; she was also the first blind woman to be admitted to the practice of law in California.

== Early life and education ==
La Barraque was born in France, and moved to California with her parents as a girl. Blind from before age 2, she was educated at the California School for the Deaf and Blind in Berkeley, and completed an undergraduate degree at the University of California in 1896, before pursuing legal training, graduating fifth in her class the Hastings School of Law. After becoming the first blind woman admitted to the bar in California, she studied music in Boston and in Italy for two years. While she was in Italy, she toured some Italian schools for the blind to write about them for The New Outlook.

== Career ==
La Barraque found success performing on the vaudeville circuit as the mysterious "Lady of the Green Veil," and as a concert singer. She also taught voice. "There is no compensation for blindness, don't let anyone tell you so," la Barraque corrected an interviewer in 1919. "But music is the source of great happiness and enjoyment to me, as it is for you." Helen Keller and Anne Sullivan Macy attended a performance by la Barraque in 1907.

As an advocate for blind people, Christine la Barraque testified before a 1906 committee of the Massachusetts legislature, and attended an international convention of blind educators in Rome. That same year, she performed at the New York State Association for Promoting the Interests of the Blind, at an event headlined by Mark Twain. In 1907, spoke at the meeting of the American Association of Workers for the Blind in Boston. She also spoke at a meeting of the General Federation of Women's Clubs in 1908, about employment possibilities for blind women. She was elected president of the San Francisco Workers for the Blind in 1927.

== Personal life ==
In 1931, la Barraque was injured in a sidewalk fall. She died in 1961, age 92.

== See also ==
- List of first women lawyers and judges in California
- List of first women lawyers and judges in the United States
