= Huddersfield & District Cricket Association =

Defunct Cricket league in Northern England

The Huddersfield & District Cricket Association was a cricket organisation in Huddersfield, West Yorkshire, England.

It was established as an association of cricket clubs in the Huddersfield, Colne Valley and Holme Valley areas after an advert was placed in the Huddersfield Weekly Examiner in July 1886. It started not as a league but rather as an administrative structure.

== Association of local clubs ==
Huddersfield's cricket leagues were established in the framework of the association. The Huddersfield & District Cricket League was formed in 1891 within the association. The Huddersfield Central Cricket League established in 1913 from the Alliance League formed 1893 from the association. The association was constituted as a league in 1905.

== Lumb Cup ==
The Lumb Cup, donated by Huddersfield born Yorkshire CCC cricketer Edward Lumb in 1887, was a knockout competition for the association clubs 1st XI teams. For over 80 years from 1913, the town of Huddersfield and the district surrounding had three different cricket leagues.

== End of association ==
The association's last season was in 1996. After the league disbanded, some of the teams joined the Central League.

== Huddersfield Association teams in 1986 ==
- Augustians
- Barker Sports
- Birkby FMA
- Birkby Old Boys
- Caribbean Youth
- Edgerton
- Huddersfield International
- Huddersfield Taxes
- Lockwood FMA
- Paddock
- Police
- Polytechnic
- Rastrick New Road
- Salendine Nook Old Boys
- Storthes Hall
