= Annie Coker =

African-American lawyer

Annie Coker (née Stephens) was California's first African-American female lawyer. Coker entering government service for the State of California in 1939, she was responsible for compiling all of the state codes, indexing all bills pending before the California legislature and rendering legal opinions.

== Early life ==
Born under the name of Annie Virginia Stephens on April 7, 1903, to William Morris (d. 1932) and Pauline Logan Stephens (d. 1929) in Oakland, California. Her family ran Stephens’ Restaurant, an Oakland establishment off 14th Street near Lake Merritt and one of the first Black-owned businesses in the area. While attending high School, Coker submit the winning nickname, Jewel City, for the Panama–Pacific International Exposition.

== Education ==
She received her Bachelor of Science degree from University of California, Berkeley. As an undergraduate Coker with the help of Ida Louise Jackson, help establish a chapter of Alpha Kappa Alpha, Berkeley's first Black sorority. Under strong encouragement from her father, Coker enrolled in UC Berkeley School of Law. Coker was one of the two female students at her time of enrollment. She also has the distinction of being the first black woman to graduate from Berkeley School of Law. She graduated in 1929 and was admitted to the State Bar of California.

Coker practiced law for a time in Alexandria, Virginia. By 1939, she returned to California, taking a position at the California Office of Legislative Counsel in Sacramento. She worked there for 25 years until her retirement in 1966.

Coker was married twice. At the Age of 83, Coker died on February 17, 1986, in Sacramento.

== See also ==
- List of first women lawyers and judges in California
