= Chinese American Citizens Alliance =

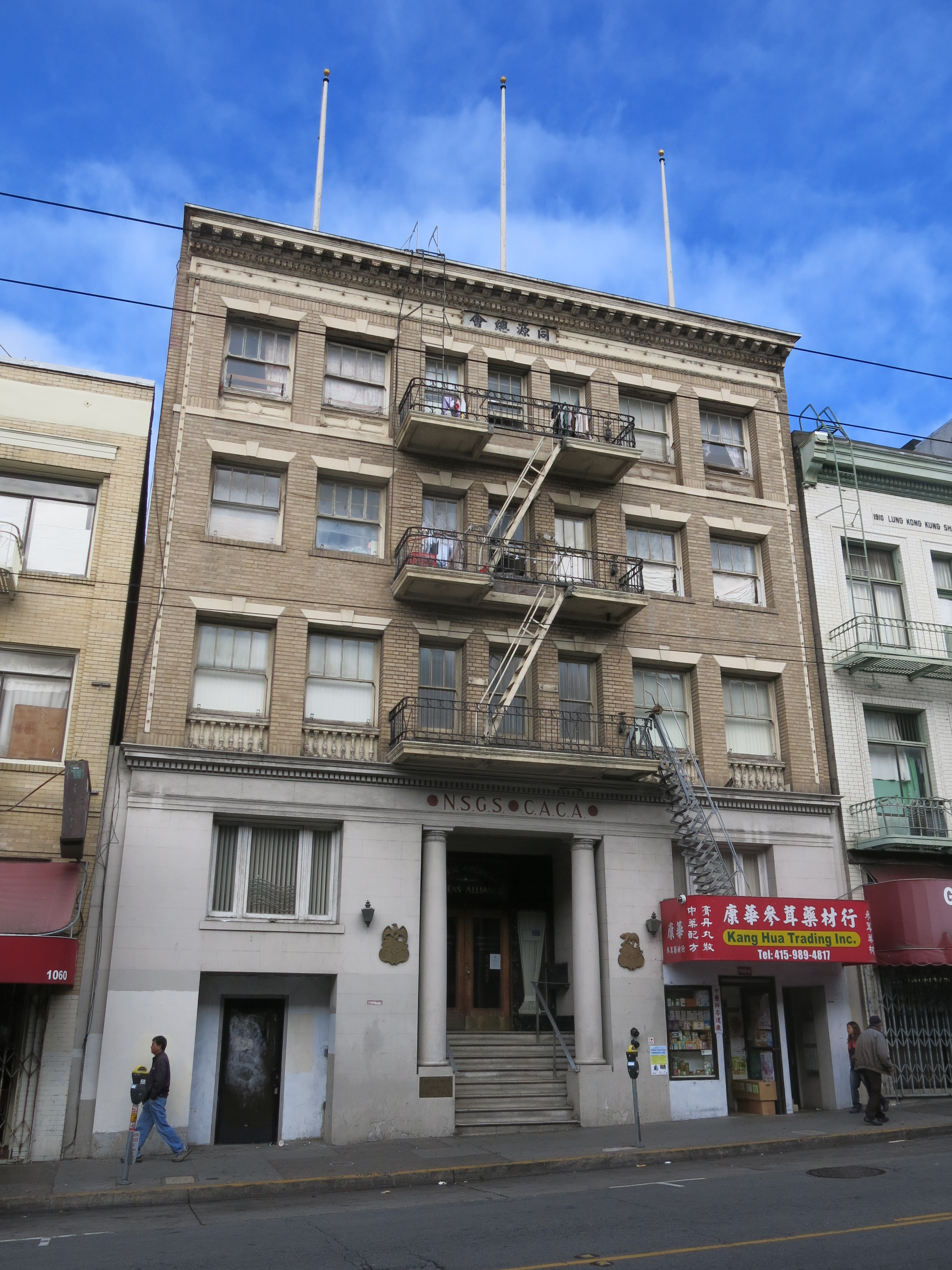
- National headquarters in Chinatown, San Francisco
- Abbreviation: C.A.C.A.
- Formation: 1895; 131 years ago
- Type: Non-profit, Non-partisan
- Headquarters: 1044 Stockton St. San Francisco, CA
- Region served: United States
- Website: www.cacanational.org
- Remarks: The nation's oldest Asian American civil rights organization

Chinese American Citizens Alliance (C.A.C.A.) is a Chinese American fraternal, benevolent non-profit organization founded in 1895 in San Francisco, California to secure equal rights for Americans of Chinese ancestry and to better the welfare of their communities. C.A.C.A. is the United States' oldest Asian American civil rights organization.

== Organization ==
C.A.C.A. was originally named the Native Sons of the Golden State (similar to the Native Sons of the Golden West) and changed to its present name in 1915 to reflect its national presence. By that time, three lodges within California in Los Angeles (1914), San Francisco (1915), and Oakland (1917) were chartered as local lodges. In the early 1920s, the building housing the national headquarters at 1044 Stockton Street in San Francisco was completed. As interest for local lodges grew beyond the Golden State, the organization's name was changed to accommodate a national alliance, the Chinese American Citizens Alliance.

As of 2026, there are twenty local lodges around the United States, including Albuquerque, Boston, Houston, Las Vegas, Los Angeles, Greenville, Oakland, Orange County, Peninsula (Santa Clara), Phoenix, Portland, Salinas, San Antonio, Greater San Gabriel Valley, San Francisco, Sacramento, Chicago, Seattle, Washington, D.C., and Greater New York.

The Board Officers are the governing body of the Alliance with its officers elected during each biennial convention. Local lodges each have their own lodge officers and associates. In addition, each local lodge annually chooses a National Representative to serve in a liaison capacity between their own lodge and the Board Officers.

== Mission and values ==
The Purposes and Objectives of the Chinese American Citizens Alliance are to empower Chinese Americans by:

- pursuing the highest ethics, morals, and values, practicing and defending American citizenship and American patriotism,
- bettering the economic and political opportunities in our communities,
- preserving their historical and cultural traditions, and
- assuring the education of their youth and community.

The Principles each Member must abide by are:

- "A Member shall be a person of highest character and shall uphold the principles of charity, justice, fidelity, fellowship, and mutual help of other Members, shall support the pursuit of knowledge, and must suppress self-interest to foster an organization united in cause for the good of community and our Alliance."

== History ==
C.A.C.A has had over a century of civil rights advocacy and local community development. The Chinese Times, founded in 1924 by Walter U. Lum, became the official and national newspaper of the Alliance for over 60 years and, at one point, grew to the largest circulated Chinese language newspaper in the country. Many community projects, such as the City College of San Francisco Chinatown/North Beach campus, San Francisco Chinatown Playground, and a San Francisco Chinatown police substation, have been due to the efforts and influence of Alliance members.

In recent times, C.A.C.A. continues to promote immigrant literacy programs, support the preservation of historical sites and landmarks, and approach local and state governments to ensure Asian American topics are adequately covered in school curriculums. In 2012, through the collective effort of many Asian Americans including members of the C.A.C.A., worked with the 112th Congress to secure the passage of two resolutions (H Res. 683 and S. Res. 201), expressing regret for the passage of Chinese Exclusion Laws. For H Res. 683, the House of Representatives passed the resolution by unanimous consent expressing regret over the Chinese Exclusion Act of 1882.

C.A.C.A. has had a history of youth outreach programs. The Chinese American Citizens Alliance LA Lodge Youth Council (YC) was formed in August 2001 and is supported by the Chinese American Citizens Alliance, Los Angeles Chapter. It was created in response to the growing number of students seeking college entry counseling. The main goals of the Youth Council are to assist students with the college admission process, provide opportunities for them to perform community service and for youth leadership development. Membership currently consists of high school students, college students, and recent college graduates residing in the San Fernando Valley, Chinatown, Foothill (Arcadia and Temple City), West and East San Gabriel Valley.

== Notable events ==
- 1895 – Chinese Americans in San Francisco establish the Native Sons of the Golden State in response to racism and prejudice that limited their employment, education, housing, insurance and banking opportunities. Full citizenship and informed civic engagement are key tenets.
- 1912 − The cities of San Francisco, Los Angeles, and Oakland establish lodges.
- 1915 − A new national charter is adopted to form the Chinese American Citizens Alliance under a Grand Lodge based in San Francisco.
- 1921 – C.A.C.A builds a National Headquarters in San Francisco.
- 1924 – C.A.C.A publishes Chinese Times as its official newspaper. It is the first Chinese language newspaper to be owned, edited, and published by American citizens. For 60 years, it was the principal source of national news and commentary for Chinese American communities.
- 1943 − Congress repeals Chinese exclusion provisions to permit Chinese to immigrate (albeit limited to 105 worldwide per year) and become American citizens.
- 1946 – With C.A.C.A. backing, Congress removes immigration restrictions that prevented Chinese from benefiting from the 1945 War Brides Act as non-quota wives and children of American citizens.
- 1965 – Hart-Cellar Act removes race and national origins as basis for immigration. It comes on the heels of the Civil Rights Act of 1964 and the Voting Rights Act of 1965 to atone for past discrimination.
- 2000 – With C.A.C.A. support, California voters passed a state bond measure that set aside $15 million specifically for restoration of the Angel Island Immigration Station.
- 2008 – C.A.C.A. wins House recognition of the contributions of Asian American/Pacific Islander soldiers who fought in the American Civil War.
- 2012 – C.A.C.A., with five national Asian American organizations, obtains Senate and House unanimous resolutions condemning the Chinese exclusion laws first enacted in 1882.
- 2014 – The U.S. Department of Labor, with C.A.C.A. assistance, inducts Chinese transcontinental railroad workers into its Wall of Honor.
- 2018 – C.A.C.A. establishes recognition for Chinese American World War II Veterans with a Congressional Gold Medal.
- 2022 – Chinese American Citizens Alliance Albuquerque Lodge records available for research
