= Birgit Fladager =

Current District Attorney of Stanislaus County, California, US

Stanislaus County District Attorney
- In office July 11, 2006 – January 3, 2023
- Preceded by: Jim Brazelton
- Succeeded by: Jeff Laugero

Personal details
- Education: McGeorge School of Law
- Website: Official website

Birgit Fladager is the former District Attorney of Stanislaus County, California. She was elected in June, 2006 and re-elected in 2010 and 2014. In each of those years, she got more than 50% of the vote in the primary election. She did not achieve this in 2018 and so ran against Deputy District Attorney John R. Mayne in the general election. She won that election and continued to be in office as of 2020.

She retired January 3 of 2023. She was succeeded by Jeff Laugero, who ran unopposed in 2022.

== Career ==
Birgit Fladager is the first elected female district attorney of Stanislaus County, California. One of Fladager's earliest national appearances was on an episode of Forensic Files about the murder of a teenage girl by her stepfather Douglas Mouser. Fladager was the deputy district attorney on the Douglas Mouser case and helped convict him.

Fladager made national headlines as one of the attorneys on prosecution team for Scott Peterson, who was convicted in 2004 for murdering his pregnant wife, Laci Peterson. Fladager was later in the news again for not retrying corruption charges against the Modesto mayor Carmen Sabatino (in 2006) and saying she would retry George Souliotes for murder in 2013, before settling the case for involuntary manslaughter.

Fladager was found to have not committed retaliation against former prosecutor Douglas Maner (Fladager's former employee). During depositions in that case, Fladager admitted reducing a prosecutor's suspension for driving under the influence from 45 days to 10 days and said the public was unlikely to ever find out about the change in discipline. In 2018, there was controversy about an admission that Fladager made when saying that she did not want senior attorneys to tell rookie attorneys that the defendants they were prosecuting were innocent, even when true.

== Frank Carson case ==
Prominent Modesto attorney Frank Carson and many others were arrested in August 2015 for the murder of Korey Kaufman, believed to be a petty thief who stole from Carson.

Carson ran against Fladager for District Attorney in 2014. A preliminary hearing went 18 months, breaking the record for preliminary hearing length. The record was formerly held by the McMartin Preschool case.

Carson was subsequently acquitted and Fladager stands accused of prosecutorial misconduct related to the matter.

On April 15, 2025, Stanislaus County agreed to settle the malicious prosecution lawsuit for $22.5 million, "one of the largest payouts of its kind in the history of the California courts."

== Electoral history ==
=== Stanislaus County, California District Attorney ===
In 2018, Fladager was challenged by Mayne, Patrick Kolasinski, and Stephen O'Connor in the District Attorney race.

== See also ==
- List of first women lawyers and judges in California
