= California Women Lawyers =

U.S. statewide bar association

- California Women Lawyers
- Abbreviation: CWL
- Formation: 1974
- Type: Statewide bar association
- Purpose: Advancement of women
- Headquarters: Sacramento, CA
- Key people: Jessica Lynn Rowe, Aaron, Riechert, Carpol & Riffle, APC, Amee Mikacich, Hinshaw
- Website: www.cwl.org

California Women Lawyers (CWL) is the statewide bar association for women in the U.S. state of California. Headquartered in Sacramento, CWL was founded in 1974 to seek the professional advancement of women lawyers, to promote gender equity in the legal profession and the judiciary, and to advance women's rights generally.

== Programs ==
"So You Want to Be a Judge?" aims to demystify the judicial application process and to encourage women in California to seek judicial appointment. Panelists have included the judicial appointments advisor of the Governor of California, members of the Commission on Judicial Nominees Evaluation (JNE), and sitting judges and justices from throughout the state. Panelists teach lawyers how to build the strongest résumé and gather support for appointment or election.

"Elect to Run" is a program to educate and encourage women to run for public office, meet other women who have run for office, as well as those who support or train women to run, and to get the information you need to decide whether you want to run. Keynote speakers have included Senator Toni Atkins, Senator Kevin de Leon, Oakland Mayor Libby Schaaf and State Controller Betty Yee.

Both "So You Want to be a Judge?" and "Elect to Run" have been recognized as Outstanding Member Programs by the National Conference of Women Bar Associations.

== Legislative advocacy ==
CWL promotes state and national policy initiatives meant to improve women's lives. CWL has voiced support for the Violence Against Women Act, bills that protect women's reproductive rights, and a resolution urging California corporations to include more women on their boards of directors.

CWL's legislative priorities have included work in the following areas: 1) reproductive justice (choice, maternity care, access and privacy), 2) violence against women and children (human trafficking, domestic violence, gun violence and sex crimes), 3) human rights and equality, 4) court funding and access to justice, and 5) economics.

CWL has advocated for many bills on its legislative agenda, such as:

- AB 1517, which sought to expedite the processing of DNA rape kits. CWL drafted a letter in support of this bill, and wrote directly to the Federal Bureau of Investigation (FBI) urging it to increase the speed in which DNA is tested and uploaded into the FBI's Combined DNA Index System (CODIS).
- SB 477, which protected documented foreign workers from abuse and human trafficking by banning labor contractors from charging recruitment fees and requiring full disclosure of employment conditions. CWL drafted a letter in support of this bill.
- SB 899, which protects newborn's health and safety while prohibiting the state from inserting itself into the private reproductive and medical decisions of families just because of income level. CWL drafted a letter in support of this bill.
- SB 939, which would streamline the prosecution of human trafficking charges and help victims avoid the trauma of testifying in multiple jurisdictions against their traffickers. CWL drafted a letter in support of this bill.
- In addition to these bills, CWL supported Planned Parenthood and sent letters of support for each bill on their legislative agenda. (AB 1755, AB 1841, AB 1805, and AB 1759).
- CWL supported military spouses by sending a letter to California Chief Justice Tani Cantil-Sakauye in support of the Military Spouse JD Network's drafted model rule urging that military spouses be treated similarly to corporate counsel, allowing them to practice law on a limited basis in states to which they are relocated due to their spouse's service.
- CWL, along with the County Welfare Directors Association of California (CWDACA), joined the Commercially Sexually Exploited Children Coalition (CSEC) and sent letters in support of, and testified on behalf of, an increase to the CWDACA's budget to provide training and programming for CSEC. SB 855, which included the increase, was signed into law; it establishes the CSEC program and clarifies the jurisdiction of CSEC under the child welfare system.
- At the federal level, CWL was one of the first 50 organizations in the country to sign on in support of the Protect Women's Health From Corporate Interference Act of 2014, also known as the "Not My Boss’s Business Bill".
- 2014 legislative work was especially focused on the use of social media. CWL worked with several national grassroots social media campaigns using tweet "storms" and national "town halls" to address the public.

== Amicus advocacy ==
CWL files as a friend of the court in cases which advance women's rights, gender equality and equality generally. CWL writes or joins amicus briefs on these core issues in the Supreme Court of the United States, the Ninth Circuit Court of Appeals, the California Supreme Court and the California courts of appeal. Recently CWL has been amici in briefs supporting same sex marriages, equal treatment of female and male student athletes, and the Affordable Care Act’s requirement of full insurance coverage of contraceptives approved by the Food and Drug Administration (FDA):

- Obergefell v. Hodges, Tanco v. Haslam, DeBoer v. Snyder and Bourke v. Beshear – In 2015, CWL joined the National Women's Law Center (NWLC) in an amicus brief in the United States Supreme Court in support of same sex marriages in Ohio, Tennessee, Michigan and Kentucky, and throughout the country.
- Ollier v. Sweetwater – In 2014, CWL joined the NWLC in an amicus brief in the Ninth Circuit. Ollier involved several questions of importance in the continuing effort to ensure that women and girls are treated equally in athletics. Female student-athletes brought a class action against a California high school district, alleging unlawful sex discrimination for failing to provide equal athletic participation opportunities and equal treatment/benefits in violation of Title IX. The Ninth Circuit affirmed the district court judgment granting declaratory and injunctive relief on September 19, 2014.
- Sebelius v. Hobby Lobby and Conestoga Wood Specialties Corp. v. Sebelius – CWL joined the NWLC in an amicus brief in the United States Supreme Court in support of the Affordable Care Act's requirement of full insurance coverage of FDA approved contraceptives. However, on June 30, 2014, the Court ruled that requiring closely held corporations to provide health-insurance coverage for methods of contraception that violate the sincerely held religious beliefs of the companies' owners violates the Religious Freedom Restoration Act of 1993.

== Judicial evaluations and nominations ==
Each year, candidates seeking judicial nomination request that CWL research and rate their qualifications for judicial appointment. CWL's confidential ratings are shared directly with the California governor's office.

CWL promotes a judiciary that includes people of diverse backgrounds and varied life experiences. CWL shared one of the first diversity awards given to bar associations for consistent efforts to include more women in the legal profession and on the bench.

== Annual conference ==
CWL's annual conference is a full day of educational programming tailored to address issues affecting women in law and society. Recent keynote speakers include Nancy Pelosi, Kamala Harris, Patricia Gillette, Catherine Lacavera, The Hon. Joan Dempsey Klein and professor and author Joan C. Williams.

== Annual dinner and silent auction ==
Prior to 2017, the CWL Annual Dinner was held on the first night of the California State Bar annual meeting, attended by lawyers and jurists from throughout the state. In 2017, The State Bar of California ceased holding its Annual Meeting, and as a result CWL partnered with the California Judges Association. The dinner depends, in large measure, on the sponsorships of law firms, legal departments, associations, and other professionals. At this dinner, the CWL Foundation hosts a silent auction to raise money for the foundation's work.

== CWL Foundation ==
The CWL Foundation is a 501(c)(3) organization, which serves to educate lawyers and the general public about the status of women in the legal profession and the legal issues affecting women. The foundation promotes these goals in multiple ways, including:

- Facilitating academic stipends for women, as they study for the California bar exam or work their way through law school.
- Generating and distributing educational materials about equal access and opportunities for women in law and society. The Foundation's 2010 project, "Lessons from Our Mothers," chronicles the California history of women in the legal profession and CWL's role in that history.
- Co-sponsoring the San Francisco Color of Justice Program, which won the 2012 Public Service Award from the National Conference of Women's Bar Associations. The program's other sponsors were the San Francisco County Superior Court, the National Association of Women Judges, CWL affiliate Queen's Bench Bar Association, and Balboa High School. In the continuing program, inner-city minority and underprivileged students take part in panel discussions by judges and lawyers, a mock argument, and small-group discussions.

== Leadership ==
A current list of the board of governors can be found on the CWL website.

== In-house counsel network ==
The CWL In-House Counsel Network (“IHCN”) was created by 2012-2013 CWL President Eliza Rodrigues so that CWL and in-house counsel from across the state, and from across industries, could partner on an agenda that included advancing women in law and business, gender pay equity, diversity in corporate legal and executive departments, leadership training, and educational, networking and community service opportunities.

Membership in the IHCN is limited to in-house lawyers providing legal services or serving in corporate executive positions solely for the company which employs them. “In-House Counsel” includes corporate counsel of public, private, large and small companies, non-profits, and educational institutions. The founding members of the network include Catherine Lacavera, director of litigation for Google; Sally Narey, general counsel for Fireman's Fund Insurance Company; Michelle Banks, general counsel of Gap; Natalie Panossian, senior counsel for Ricoh Printing Systems America, and Lynne Carrithers, managing counsel for Occidental Petroleum.

Other founding members include: Olga Balderama, general counsel for Ruiz Foods; Suzan “Sam” Miller, vice president of legal and corporate affairs as well as deputy general counsel for Intel; Dawn Smith, general counsel for VMware; Catherine McEvilly, vice president and general counsel for Honda North America; Laura Stein, general counsel for The Clorox Company; Erika Rottenberg, general counsel for LinkedIn, Eliza Rodrigues, associate general counsel for Sedgwick, and Debra Zumwalt, general counsel for Stanford University.

== Founders ==
The Founding Mothers of CWL included:

- Carol Agate
- Edna R. S. Alvarez
- Dagny Winkler Andreassen
- Blanche C. Bersch
- Justice Rose E. Bird
- Betty Bryant
- Jeanette Christy
- Judith E. Ciani
- Arlene Colman-Schwimmer
- Hon. Patricia Yim Cowett
- Georgia Franklin-Shutan
- Joanne M. Garvey
- Sue Hone
- Hon. Barbara Barnhouse Johnson
- Carolyn Kammler
- Melodie M. Kleiman
- Justice Joan Dempsey Klein
- Janice E. Koll
- Hon. Lucy Kelly McCabe
- Judith G. McKelvey
- Olga A. Miller
- Ruth Miller Rymer
- Marjory Winston Parker
- Barbara Price
- Hon. Roberta Ralph, Ret.
- Drucilla Stender Ramey
- Hon. Louise H. Renne
- Renee Rubin
- Beverly Savitt
- Lynn Schenk
- Candis Scott
- Carol Ruth Silver
- Mary-Louise Smith
- Fay Stender
- Karen Pedersen Stevens
- Diane Wayne
- Elizabeth Yahn Williams
- Norma Zarky

== Past presidents ==
- Ana Storey, 2021-2022
- Naomi Dewey, 2020-2021
- Jessica Rowe, 2019-2020
- Amee Mikacich, 2018-2019
- Hon. Renee N.G. Stackhouse, 2017-2018
- Chris Goodman, 2016-2017
- Kelly Robbins, 2015-2016
- Hon. Wendy Behan, 2014-2015
- Neda Mansoorian, 2013-2014
- Eliza M. Rodrigues, 2012-2013
- Patricia Sturdevant, 2011-2012
- Nancy E. O’Malley, 2009-2011
- Jean M. Pledger, 2008-2009
- Karen M. Goodman, 2007-2008
- Angela J. Davis, 2006-2007
- Pearl Gondrella Mann, 2005-2006
- Hon. Marguerite D. Downing, 2004-2005
- Candace M. Carroll, 2003-2004
- Andrea S. Carlise, 2002-2003
- Belynda Reck, 2001-2002
- Carol C. Copsey, 2000-2001
- Nancy Hoffmeier Zamora, 1999-2000
- Gillian M. Ross, 1998-1999
- Grace E. Emery, (Dec.), 1997-1998
- Vivian L. Kral, 1996-1997
- E. Jean Gary, 1995-1996
- Dawn M. Schock, 1994-1995
- Lisa E. Brandon, 1993-1994
- Hon. Angela Bradstreet, 1993-1993
- Anne D. McGowan, 1991-1992
- Doris Coleman, (Dec.), 1989-1990, 1990-1991
- Hon. Marjorie Laird Carter, 1988-1989
- Janice Kamenir-Reznik, 1987-1988
- Pauline Weaver, 1986-1987
- Patricia A. Shiu, 1985-1986
- Pamela J. Jester, 1984-1985
- Hon. Meredith C. Taylor (Ret.), 1983-1984
- Christine Curtis, 1982-1983
- Susan R. Stockel, 1981-1982
- Eileen Cochran (Dec.)
- Marjorie M. Holmes, 1980-1981
- Hon. Barbara T. Gamer (Ret.), 1979-1980
- Hon. Isabel Cohen (Ret.), 1979
- Melodie M. Kleiman, 1978-1979
- Louise Renne, 1977-1978
- Hon. Barbara J. Johnson, 1976-1977
- Judith McKelvey, 1975-1976
- Hon. Joan Dempsey Klein, Provisional President
- Hon. Roberta Ralph (Ret.)
- Co-Chair, Organizing Committee, 1974
- Joanne M. Garvey (Dec.)
- Co-Chair Organizing Committee, 1974
