= Mary Virginia Orozco =

American lawyer (1928–2019)

Mary Virginia Orozco was California’s first Latina female lawyer. She was also the first Latina to graduate from Loyola Law School.

She was born on September 24, 1928, in Whittier, California. Her parents were adamant that their children received a proper education. As an example, since Orozco’s parents were not property owners, they asked their landlord to obtain library cards for their children from the Whittier Public Library.

Orozco completed her undergraduate studies in psychology and sociology at the California State University, Los Angeles before attending Loyola Law School. Orozco worked full-time to support her immediate family while attending.

She was admitted to the State Bar of California in 1962 as the state’s first Latina lawyer. With the Spanish-speaking community as her major focus, Orozco set out to establish a legal practice that specialized in family, civil and criminal law. She eventually established the law firm Orozco & Orozco with her twin brother Hector. Orozco faced both racial and sex discrimination while practicing in the California courtrooms. In 1962, Orozco was a founder of the Mexican American Bar Association (MABA) in Los Angeles, and was a founding member for the Latina Lawyers Bar Association. She retired from practicing law in 1987.

Orozco died on June 5, 2019.

== See also ==
- List of first women lawyers and judges in California
