= Emma Ping Lum =

American lawyer

- Born: August 10, 1910
- Died: 1989 (aged 78–79)
- Education: San Francisco State University; Columbia University
- Occupation: Lawyer

Emma Ping Lum (1910-1989) was the first Chinese American female lawyer in the United States and California.

== Early life ==
Lum was born on August 10, 1910, to Walter U. Lum and Gum Young Lee. She was one of seven children. Her father Walter was a prominent figure in Chinatown, San Francisco. He founded the newspaper Chinese Times in 1924, and launched various political efforts to abolish the Expatriation Act of 1907 and the Chinese Exclusion Act.

== Education ==
Lum earned her A.B. from San Francisco State College in 1934 and an M.A. from Columbia University in 1943. Lum was fluent in various Chinese dialects, and applied those skills while working in San Francisco's Office of Censorship, earning a certificate of merit for her service, during World War II.

In 1947, Lum graduated from UC Hastings College of the Law and became a member of the State Bar of California. In 1952, she was the first Chinese American female to practice before the United States Supreme Court. By 1966, she had long established her legal practice at 745 Grant Avenue in San Francisco. Her affiliations included the California State Bar Association, San Francisco Bar Association, the Queen’s Bench, and the Kappa Beta Phi legal sorority.

== Death ==
Lum died in May 1989.

== See also ==
- List of first women lawyers and judges in the United States
- List of first women lawyers and judges in California
