= Zachary Alakaʻi Lum =

Hawaiian musician and composer

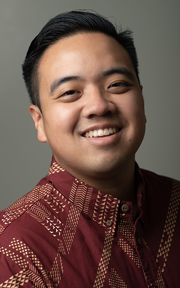
Zachary Lum headshot for Kāhuli Leo Leʻa Board of Directors

Zachary Alakaʻi Lum (born February 17, 1992) is a Native Hawaiian musician, composer, hula dancer, scholar, activist, educator, and philanthropist.

== Early life ==
Lum was born at Castle Medical Center on the island of Oʻahu and was raised in Haʻikū, Heʻeia, Koʻolaupoko, Oʻahu.

== Education ==
Lum is a 2010 graduate of Kamehameha Schools Kapālama Campus. It was there that his interest in music grew, specifically in Hawaiian Music. During his time in high school, he was a member of the band, the concert glee club, and led his class as student director for the annual Kamehameha Schools Song Contest during each of his four years there. Upon graduating, he furthered his musical education at the University of Hawaiʻi at Mānoa, where he earned BAs in Music with a focus on Piano Performance and ʻŌlelo Hawaiʻi, respectively. He would also go on to receive his MA in Ethnomusicology from the University of Hawaiʻi at Mānoa.

Lum is a longtime student of Kumu Hula Robert Uluwehionāpuaikawēkiuokalani Cazimero and dances hula for Cazimero's Hālau Nā Kamalei O Līlīlehua. Lum was formally admitted into the hālau in 2017.

Currently, Lum is pursuing a Doctorate Degree at the University of Hawaiʻi at Mānoa in the Indigenous Politics Program.

== Professional career ==
From 2014-2020, Lum served as the Director of Choral Music at Kamehameha Schools Kapālama Campus. He currently serves as Executive Director of the non-profit organization, Kāhuli Leo Leʻa.

As a musician, Lum has won various awards and accolades as a member of the Hawaiian music group Keauhou. He is a four-time winner of the highly-coveted Haku Mele (Composer's) Award, awarded by the Hawaiʻi Academy of Recording Arts at its annual Nā Hōkū Hanohano Awards celebration.

As of March 2021, Lum has worked as a producer, composer, musical arranger, and musician on many musical albums focused on promoting the values of Aloha ʻĀina, such as Kūhaʻo Maunakea, Lei Nāhonoapiʻilani: Songs of West Maui, Lei Nāhonoapiʻilani: Nā Mele Hou, Huliāmahi Volume One, and Kāwili.
