= Lumley Thicks =

Village in County Durham, England

Coordinates: 54.848°N 1.532°W

Lumley Thicks is a small village in County Durham, in England. It is situated between Chester-le-Street and Houghton-le-Spring, north of Great Lumley.
