= Joanne Garvey =

American lawyer

- Born: Joanne M. Garvey; Oakland, California, U.S.
- Education: University of California at Berkeley, UC Berkeley School of Law
- Occupation: Attorney
- Writing career
- Notable awards: State Bar of California Taxation Section Joanne M. Garvey Award; American Bar Association Commission on Women's 2003 Margaret Brent Women Lawyers of Achievement Award

Joanne M. Garvey (1935–2014) was an American attorney and a nationally recognized expert in field of taxation. She was the first woman to serve on the California State Bar Board of Governors from 1971 to 1974, and was one of the founders of the California Women Lawyers organization in 1974.

Garvey was also the first female president of the San Francisco Barristers, and in 1981 became the first female president of the Bar Association of San Francisco since the Association's founding in 1872. In addition, she served in a number of leadership positions with different sections and committees of the American Bar Association, and as a member of its Board of Governors and House of Delegates. Moreover, Garvey helped form the State Bar of California's Taxation Section, from which she also received the Section's lifetime achievement award in 1994—the Joanne M. Garvey Award—which was named for her.

In 2003, Garvey received the American Bar Association Commission on Women's 2003 Margaret Brent Women Lawyers of Achievement Award. After Garvey's death in 2014, Charles Rettig—prior to becoming Commissioner of the Internal Revenue Service—stated that: "From every perspective, Joanne Garvey was a legend… She was among the most highly respected lawyers in the United States (tax or otherwise)".

== Education ==
Garvey grew up in Oakland, California. She attended Holy Names High School, where she was a member of the basketball team. Garvey received her undergraduate degree with honors from the University of California at Berkeley, obtained a master's degree in history from the University of California at Berkeley, and received her juris doctor from UC Berkeley School of Law, where she was one of only five women in her graduating class.

== Professional life ==
Garvey began her career as an attorney in Santa Barbara, in 1962, and then practiced at the law firm Jordan, Keeler and Seligman in San Francisco, California, for 25 years. She later joined the San Francisco-based law firm Heller Ehrman in 1988, and then moved to Sheppard, Mullin, Richter & Hampton after the Heller Ehrman firm dissolved in 2008.
