= Edward Lumb =

English cricketer

Edward Lumb (12 September 1852 – 5 April 1891) was an English first-class cricketer, who played in fourteen matches for Yorkshire County Cricket Club between 1872 and 1886. He also appeared for North of England (1877), Gentlemen of the North (1877) and an England Eleven (1878) in first-class games.

Born in Huddersfield, Yorkshire, England, when he was aged 15 he played for the Yorkshire Colts and also Lascelles Hall C.C., and at the age of 20 he captained the Dalton C.C. side. He was the donor of the Lumb Cup, played annually in the Huddersfield district from 1887, and he became president of the Huddersfield League.

A right-handed batsman, he scored 356 runs at 15.47, with a best of 70 not out against Middlesex, his other scores of over fifty was another unbeaten innings of 60 against Surrey. Lumb took seven catches in the field but he did not bowl.

Lumb died of pleurisy in April 1891 in Westminster, London, aged 38.
