= Peter Lum =

Malaysian television personality

Peter Lum is a Malaysian fashion stylist. His work can be seen on One in a Million (a Malaysian singing competition TV series), 8TV's Quickie and Music Unlimited, and So You Think You Can Dance. Lum put together the cover of MIFA (Malaysia International Fashion Alliance) Style KL.

Peter Lum had the role of the Mentor on the debut season of Project Runway Malaysia on 8TV in 2007.

His profile and interviews appeared in the September–October 2007 issue of Men's Folio (along with his co-host of Project Runway Malaysia, Bernie Chan) and the October 2007 issue of Oxygen magazines.

He styles the hosts on 8TV Quickies and the fashion and beauty pages in Air Asia's Travel 3Sixty in-flight magazine.

He is continuing his work in the Media Relations for both international brands and homegrown brands, and conducting fashion styling and retail grooming for workshops for international retailers and their staff.
