= Lucas Green, Lancashire =

Coordinates: 53.679°N 2.633°W

Lucas Green
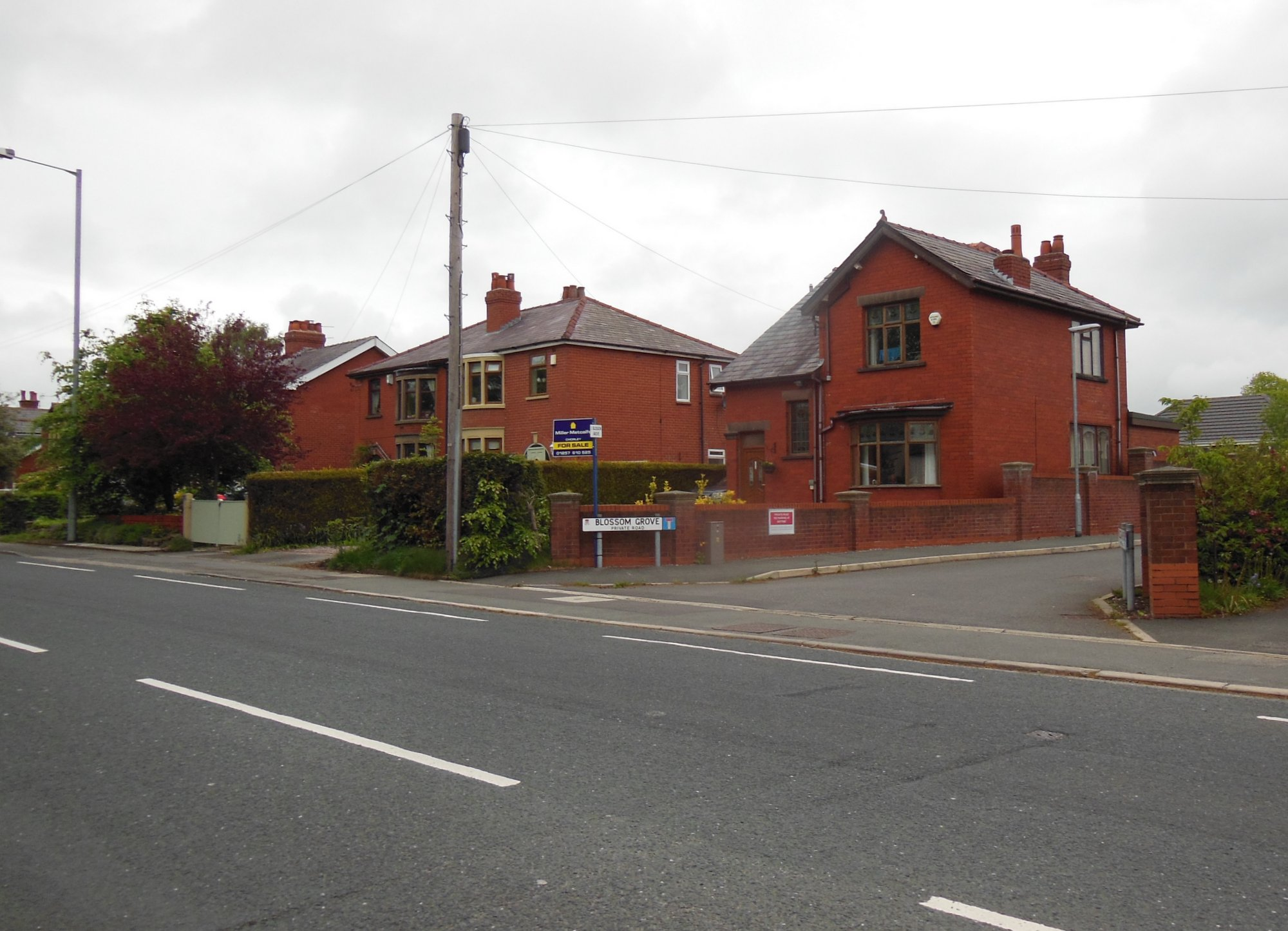
- Houses on the A6 Preston Road

- Shown within Chorley Borough Location within Lancashire
- OS grid reference: SD581204
- Civil parish: Whittle-le-Woods
- District: Chorley
- Shire county: Lancashire
- Region: North West
- Country: England
- Sovereign state: United Kingdom
- Post town: CHORLEY
- Postcode district: PR6
- Dialling code: 01257
- Police: Lancashire
- Fire: Lancashire
- Ambulance: North West
- UK Parliament: Chorley

Lucas Green is a village in Lancashire, England.
