= Abby Abinanti =

American lawyer (born 1947)

Abby Abinanti (born 1947 in San Francisco, California) is California's first Native American female lawyer.

== Early life and education ==
Abinanti grew up on the Yurok Indian Reservation. She studied journalism at Humboldt State University and later enrolled at the University of New Mexico School of Law. She developed an interest in Indian law and later specialised in family court proceedings and juvenile dependency, influenced in part by the Indian Child Welfare Act (1978).

== Career ==
She was admitted to the State Bar of California in 1974.

During her legal career, Abinanti developed a tribal programme to assist members with the expungement process. In the 1990s, she served as a commissioner in the Unified Family Court for the San Francisco Superior Court until retiring in 2011. From 2014 to 2015, she served as a part-time commissioner in the court's dependency division.

Abinanti has served as a judge of the Yurok Tribal Court since 1997 and has been its Chief Judge since 2007.

== See also ==
- List of first women lawyers and judges in California
- List of Native American jurists
