= Luxley =

Village in Gloucestershire, England

Coordinates: 51.89295°N 2.45915°W

Luxley is a hamlet in the southwest Midlands of England, straddling the parishes of Aston Ingham (Herefordshire) and Longhope (Gloucestershire) near May Hill. It is 12 km (7.5 mi) southeast of Ross-on-Wye and 18 km (11 mi) west of Gloucester.

In the historical records for Longhope, it is noted that "the cottage at Luxley, in the north, was part of a copyhold farmstead in the 19th century".

The name has a number of variations. Victorian maps show Luxtre while current place names include Luxtree Farm and Upper Laxtree.
