= Alice Athenia Lytle =

American judge

Alice Athenia Lytle (1939-2018) was an American judge and the first African American woman to serve on California's Superior Court. Lytle graduated from New York's Hunter College with a Bachelor's degree in Physiology and Public Health in 1961 and became a medical technician specializing in pediatric cardiology working first in New York and then in San Francisco. After the assassination of Dr. Martin Luther King, Jr. in 1968, Lytle rededicated her career to social justice and studied law at UC San Francisco's Hastings College, earning a degree in 1973.

Lytle was known for her dedication to family, children, and social justice - themes which connected her work in pediatric cardiology, law, and policy.

== Early life ==
Lytle was born in Newark, New Jersey and raised in Harlem, New York as the eighth of ten children to Lacey and Margaret Lytle.

== Career ==
=== Law School, Teaching, and the Brown Administration in California ===
After leaving behind a successful career as a medical technician, Lytle dedicated herself to becoming a Civil Rights Lawyer and while attending law school she served as president of the Black Law Students Association. While a law student, Lytle advanced Civil Rights through work with both the Alameda County Public Defender's Office and the Legal Defense Fund of the National Association for the Advancement of Colored People (N.A.A.C.P.). After law school, Lytle first taught law at the New College of California School of Law in San Francisco, before serving as Chief Deputy of Legal Affairs in California Governor Jerry Brown's first term in 1975. Lytle worked in Brown's administration throughout the second half of the 1970s and the early 1980s, rising to a cabinet appointment as Secretary of the State and Consumers Services Agency in 1979. Lytle was the first African American woman to hold the post.

=== Sacramento Municipal Court and Superior Court ===
Gov. Brown appointed Lytle to the Sacramento Municipal Court in 1983 and she was the first African American woman to serve on the court. While serving on the Sacramento Municipal Court, Lytle collaborated with Judge Rudolph R. "Barry" Loncke to establish La Casita, a waiting room for children whose family were before the court at the Gordon D. Schaber Courthouse. She also created a mentoring program for juvenile wards called the SacraMentor Program and advocated for and created early childhood development programs for teenage mothers, such as the Healthy Teen Mothers Project and the Birthing Project. Lytle went on to head the municipal court from 1988-1989 and to serve as the presiding judge over the Juvenile Court for Sacramento Municipal Court from 1995-1996. She was known as a humane and compassionate jurist who would exhaust other options before sentencing time in Juvenile Detention, a position that led to her being criticized as "soft on crime" in the late 1990s—though Lytle herself dismissed this criticism as "election year politics". After a statewide ballot amendment led to the consolidation of the Municipal and Superior Courts of Sacramento in 1998, Gov. Brown appointed Lytle to the Sacramento County Superior Court making her, once again, the first African American woman to serve on the court and served as the only African American woman on the court until shortly before her retirement in 2002.

=== Racial and Identity Profiling Advisory Board ===
In 2016, Lytle came out of retirement to serve on the Attorney General's Racial and Identity Profiling Advisory Board, once again appointed to the position by Governor Jerry Brown. The Advisory Board was created after California bill AB 953 was approved and signed into law in 2015. The bill mandated statewide local reporting of racial and identity demographics for all stops performed by police and officers of the peace and reporting of any and all citizen complaints alleging racial or identity profiling. The Advisory Board was tasked with analyzing and reporting on the collected data and making policy suggestions aimed at eliminating racial and identity profiling, increasing diversity, and increasing racial and identity sensitivity in California law enforcement.
