= Walter U. Lum =

American activist and newspaper editor

Walter Uriah Lum (Chinese: 林華耀, 1882–1961) was a Chinese American leader, newspaper editor, educator and an advocate for Chinese American civil rights.

== Early life ==
Lum was born in San Francisco to Lum Guey Yue and Yan Lan, and was the fourth child and only son.

In the 1860s, upon receiving stories from his brother Guey Yee about the successful mining ventures in California, Guey Yue, Yan Lan, and Choy Fung (Walter U. Lum's older sister) emigrated to the United States from Xinhui in the Siyi area of Guangdong in China. However, rather than mining, the Lum brothers catered to Chinese and Euro-American miners by opening up a grocery store in the Sacramento River area. In 1879, the entire family relocated to San Francisco so the Lum brothers could open another grocery store. By the time Lum was born in 1882, the family had established their roots in the city.

When it came time for Lum's formal education, his parents wanted to prevent him from being teased in the American school system due to his Chinese-style clothing and background. Thus, Lum received his education from private tutors; thereby becoming fluent in both Chinese and English.

== Career ==
In 1904, Lum, Joseph Lum (no relation) and Ng Gunn reorganized the Native Sons of the Golden State (renamed the Chinese American Citizens Alliance, CACA, in 1915) to support Chinese American rights and oppose the Chinese Exclusion Act of 1882, including a boycott in China of American goods. Lum was Grand President of the organization and its governing body the Grand Lodge on different occasions for a total of about twelve years.

Around 1912 he joined the staff of Young China, the newspaper of the Chinese Nationalist Party in the US for a few years. He worked at various times as a reporter, translator and editor.

He briefly served as vice president and managing director of the Chinese-owned China Mail Steamship Line. When financial difficulties increased, Lum received death threats from one of the “fighting tongs” and had to hire bodyguards. Eventually, he resigned.

Many members of CACA had, like Lum, received their formal education in English. However, in order for CACA to fully reach out to both immigrant and American-born Chinese, in 1924 Lum founded the Chinese Times newspaper, written in Chinese, and referred by some as the first Chinese language newspaper in the United States. By 1929, Chinese Times had the highest circulation among the Chinese newspapers in San Francisco. For thirty-five years, Lum served as the editor, managing editor, vice president, and president of the Chinese Times Publishing Company.

== Personal life ==
In 1899, Lum married Gum Young Lee (1885–1936). They had seven children, including daughter Emma Ping Lum (born August 10, 1910), who later became an outstanding lawyer. Lum's eldest daughter, Mabel Lum Lew, created an upstanding restaurant called "Mabel's Cafe" that was run with the help of the Lum family for 25 years.

== Advocacy ==
One of his early political efforts focused upon repealing the Expatriation Act of 1907, which stated "that any American woman who marries a foreigner shall take the nationality of her husband." This effort failed; the policy in question was later partially repealed by the Cable Act, but still applied if the husband was ineligible for citizenship due to Asian descent.

Lum wanted to block the bill that supported the racial ideas of the Chinese Exclusion Act (Caminette Bill). Caminette Bill made it so that if a father of a Chinese American was not a Native American, he would not have the power to vote and as a result, the offspring of that father will also be denied the power. Lum also advocated for Chinese women and wives to give them more liberties while also trying to repeal the Chinese Exclusion Act.

Lum funded study courses for Chinese Americans that taught 3000 to 4000 characters. The method of teaching in this school was similar to the western way of teaching.

In 1941 Lum started an experimental school that ran two hours a day, five days week and taught about fifty mostly American-born children of members divided into two classes. Lum was the principal and one of the instructors. He seized the opportunity to implement some of his ideas on teaching Chinese to the American-born. The classes used both were in the more easily understood vernacular style and were chosen with an emphasis on teaching vocabulary commonly used in contemporary society. These teaching methods generated some favorable results.

In 1943, the school became a casualty of World War II. Enrollment dropped to twelve. By mid 1943, the school closed.

== Legacy ==
Walter U. Lum Place is a street in San Francisco's Chinatown named in Lum's honor. In addition, the Chinese American Citizens Alliance named the National Walter U. Lum Scholarship after him.

== See also ==
- List of first women lawyers and judges in California

== Sources ==
- civilrightssuite.org
- Remaking Chinese America: immigration, family, and community, 1940–1965
- Claiming America: constructing Chinese American identities during the exclusion era
