= The Confession Tapes =

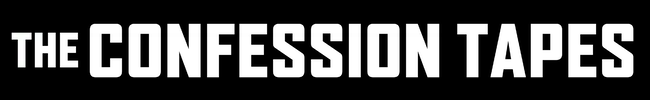
- Genre: True crime; Television documentary
- Created by: Kelly Loudenberg
- Directed by: Kelly Loudenberg
- No. of seasons: 2
- No. of episodes: 11

Production
- Executive producers: Sarah Whalen; Steve Robillard; Jeff Bumgarner
- Running time: 40-54 mins.
- Production companies: Netflix (season 1); A24 (season 2)

Original release
- Network: Netflix
- Release: September 8, 2017 – June 21, 2019

The Confession Tapes is a true crime television documentary series that presents several cases of possible false confessions leading to murder convictions of the featured people. In each case, the documentary presents alternate views of how the crime could have taken place and features experts on false confessions, criminal law, miscarriages of justice and psychology. The series, produced and distributed by Netflix, became available to all Netflix subscribers on September 8, 2017. Critics praised the series, likening it to other Netflix true crime documentaries, such as The Keepers and Making a Murderer.

== Episodes ==
=== Series overview ===
Season	Episodes	Originally released
1	7	September 8, 2017
2	4	June 21, 2019

=== Season 1 (2017) ===
No. overall	No. in season	Title	Directed by	Written by	Original release date
1	1	"True East Part 1"	Kelly Loudenberg	Kelly Loudenberg	September 8, 2017
After the 1994 murder of both of his parents and his sister, Atif Rafay, along with friend Sebastian Burns, become suspects. Although the murders happened in the United States, Rafay and Burns, Canadian citizens, returned to Canada after local police found insufficient evidence to keep them. Back in Canada, in coordination with the US Federal Bureau of Investigation, the Royal Canadian Mounted Police use the controversial Mr. Big investigative technique to extract confessions from the suspected killers.
2	2	"True East Part 2"	Kelly Loudenberg	Kelly Loudenberg	September 8, 2017
The trial of Atif Rafay and Sebastian Burns begins in Seattle, Washington. The court refuses to allow the defense to present evidence that the murders may have been conducted by the religious extremist group Jamaat ul-Fuqra, and both are thereafter found guilty and sentenced to life in prison. Both continue to maintain their innocence.
3	3	"A Public Apology"	Kelly Loudenberg	Kelly Loudenberg	September 8, 2017
In 1997, Teresa Haught is murdered, and then the nightclub the crime took place in is burned down. The police immediately finger Wesley Myers for the crime, and after hours of interrogation, extract three confessions from him: one in writing, one on tape, and one in front of a television reporter. Myers denies his guilt at trial and claims his confession was false, but is still found guilty. In 2012, a retrial is ordered after a judge determines Myers' constitutional rights were violated, but fearing another jury trial, Myers pleads guilty to voluntary manslaughter, and is sentenced to time served, thus being freed. Myers continues to maintain his innocence.
4	4	"Trial By Fire"	Kelly Loudenberg	Kelly Loudenberg	September 8, 2017
In 2002 a fire started by a gas can burns down a house in the small town of Zeeland, Michigan, killing 14-year-old Robin Boes of smoke inhalation. Investigators extract a confession from the teen's mother, Karen Boes, and she goes on to be convicted of first-degree murder and is sentenced to life in prison without the possibility of parole. Despite this, she maintains her innocence, and continues to claim her confession was false.
5	5	"8th and H"	Kelly Loudenberg	Kelly Loudenberg	September 8, 2017
Catherine Fuller, 49, is brutally raped, robbed and murdered in Washington D.C. in 1984. Investigating detectives immediately suspect gang violence, and connect the murder to the 8th and H Street Crew, which participants in the documentary claim never existed. Casting a wide net, seventeen people are arrested for the crime, and the State's main witness, Clifton Yarborough, names all of them in being present during the attack. Police ignore inconsistencies in Yarborough's story, and also the fact that Yarborough himself has a low IQ and suffers from a learning disability. All seventeen men stand trial at once, which causes a chaotic and divided defense; the defense lawyers turn the men against each other, saying in court that while it's possible some of the accused did it, the alibis of many of the men are solid. The jury finds eight of the accused guilty after months of deliberation - and appeals bring the case all the way to the Supreme Court of the United States. Although the court rejected the appeal in Turner v. United States, the accused still maintain their innocence.
6	6	"The Labor Day Murders"	Kelly Loudenberg	Kelly Loudenberg	September 8, 2017
On Labor Day in the year 2000, John Lavelle Lynn and Robert Arthur VanAllen, an owner and an employee of an auto salvage yard respectively, are murdered. Out of hundreds of potential witnesses, police eventually question Buddy Woodall, the nephew of one of the slain men. Woodall, represented by attorney Chris Adams confesses, not to the murder, but to helping another man, David Wimberly, carry out the murder. The men are tried separately, and Woodall is convicted; but, due to lack of evidence, the case against Wimberly is dropped by the prosecutor. In 2014, the Supreme Court of Georgia upholds Woodall's conviction, despite alleged problems with the trial and conduct of the police. Buddy Woodall continues to maintain his innocence.
7	7	"Down River"	Kelly Loudenberg	Kelly Loudenberg	September 8, 2017
While on a family outing, Lawrence DeLisle's Ford LTD station wagon is driven off the edge of a pier in Downriver, Michigan with himself, his wife, and all four of his children inside. When the car hits the water, the windshield shatters, allowing DeLisle and his wife to get free. Rescue workers attempt to save the four children, but all four never regain consciousness. DeLisle originally claims that his leg cramped, causing him to lose control of the vehicle, but later confesses during an interrogation his attorney would later liken to hypnosis. While the court rules the confession inadmissible, it is still made available to the media. In the ensuing trial by media, newspapers and television stations comment on the tape without directly reproducing it, which would be against the court order. Despite the confession never being read in court, the jury finds DeLisle guilty for four murders and one attempted murder of his wife on August 1, 1990. Despite exhausting all of his appeals, DeLisle continues to maintain his innocence, blaming the car instead.

=== Season 2 (2019) ===
No. overall	No. in season	Title	Directed by	Written by	Original release date
8	1	"Gaslight"	Kelly Loudenberg	Kelly Loudenberg	June 21, 2019
Without a lawyer to advise him, weary truck driver Kenneth Osburn confesses to murdering 17-year-old Casey Crowder following an exhausting interrogation.
9	2	"Joyride"	Kelly Loudenberg	Kelly Loudenberg	June 21, 2019
The double murder of Wayne and Sharmon Stock in Nebraska sparks a hunt for those responsible and a bizarre series of interviews that raise more questions than they answer.
10	3	"Deep Down"	Kelly Loudenberg	Kelly Loudenberg	June 21, 2019
In a long interview with police, Angelika Graswald admits to being "OK with" her fiancé drowning during a kayaking expedition. Cops and media pounce.
11	4	"Marching Orders"	Kelly Loudenberg	Kelly Loudenberg	June 21, 2019
After Hamid Hayat admits to attending a terrorist camp, lawyers and his family question whether the taped confession reveals a very different truth.

== Reception ==
Reception to the series was mostly positive. The Daily Beast called it "harrowing", saying it "further solidifies" Netflix as the "leading purveyor of non-fiction true-crime TV." JOE described the series as "addictive". One of the women featured, Karen Boes, told WCRZ that she was hopeful the documentary would help exonerate her. Scientific American praised the series, saying that it proves that "we need to change the way police do interrogations."
