= Ronald Theodore Reuther =

American zookeeper (1929–2007)

- Born: 25 December 1929; Miami, Florida, United States
- Died: 4 October 2007 (aged 77)
- Occupations: Zoo director, naturalist, aviation enthusiast
- Known for: Allowing Francine "Penny" Patterson to begin work with Koko the Gorilla and founding the Oakland Aviation Museum.

Ronald Theodore Reuther (1929–2007) was a committed naturalist who spent decades managing and improving several major zoos, and was an aviation enthusiast. Armed with a Bachelor of Science in wildlife conservation, Reuther held curator and director positions for the Micke Grove Zoo, the Cleveland Zoo, the Indianapolis Zoo, the San Francisco Zoo, and the Philadelphia Zoo. As director of the San Francisco Zoo, Reuther was instrumental in the creation of a project to teach the gorilla Koko sign language. As a member of the Association of Zoos and Aquariums, Reuther helped to advance the transformation of zoos into research centers, and to promote the conservation and care of wildlife. As an aviation enthusiast, Reuther founded the Western Aerospace Museum and pursued the study of his personal interest in the disappearance of pilot Amelia Earhart.

== Early life ==
Reuther was born in Miami, Florida, on December 25, 1929. As a young boy, he developed an early love of animals and a fascination with flight. He raised racing pigeons, ducks and chickens in his backyard, and would spend time at the beach with his brother and sister watching the birds at the shore. "The birds flying on the beach was a big part of his flying idea." said his wife, Gerry Elkus.

After the start of World War II, Reuther's family moved to the Bay Area where he later attended San Francisco's Lowell High School. During this period he became active in naturalist concerns. During the summer of 1945, Reuther worked on a game bird farm in Napa, California. He also helped establish the Western Bird Banding Association, and worked to help stop the indiscriminate shooting of California sea lions by the U.S. Coast Guard at Point Reyes. Ron would also spend a great deal of time at the San Francisco Zoo visiting his uncle Carey Baldwin, who was its director for 23 years.

After graduating from high school, Reuther attended the University of California-Berkeley to study Wildlife Conservation. During this period, Ron continued to work on advancing the study of wildlife by establishing the Point Reyes Bird Observatory. He also worked with the U.S. Public Health Service, as a Field Biologist, studying the epidemiology of encephalitis. As a field biologist, he spent time in California and Japan studying the natural history of birds.

Reuther received his bachelor's degree in Wildlife Conservation in 1951. He went on to do some graduate work studying Zoology at the University of Arizona, and Paleontology at the University of California-Berkeley.

During Reuther's graduate work, he served in the Reserve Officers Training Corps for the U.S. Air Force. In 1954 he officially joined the Air Force and became a pilot. For the next two years, Reuther flew B-26 Bombers and C-119 "flying boxcars" during tours of duty in Europe and North Africa.

Reuther remained active in the Air Force Reserve for most of his life, until he retired as a lieutenant colonel in 1981. Reuther received the Meritorious Service Medal.

== Zoological career ==
In 1957, Ronald Reuther moved back to California and became the first director of the fledgling Micke Grove Zoo in Lodi, California. His philosophy that zoos were meant to educate the public on the importance of animal conservation was quite new at the time. Part of his approach was the insistence that zoos charge admission in order to generate money to do the work.

After a year at Micke Grove Zoo, Reuther moved to Ohio to take the position of general curator for the Cleveland Zoo. While there, Reuther authored The Official Guide Book - Cleveland Zoological Park. From 1962 to 1964 he was the director of the Indianapolis Zoo, moved back to Cleveland to become its zoo's assistant director from 1964 to 1966, then moved back to California to become the director of the San Francisco Zoo.

While director of the San Francisco Zoo, from 1966 to 1973, Reuther transformed the zoo from an amusement center, to a center of education and research. When he arrived at the zoo, he was faced with a meager budget, and a volunteer veterinarian. "First of all, there just be facilities and staff—then you go on from there, to match what other zoos already are accomplishing" Reuther said in 1968. By 1973, he had increased the zoo's budget by 50 percent and hired a full-time veterinarian and full-time zoologists.

In 1972, Reuther saved the life of a baby gorilla, born at the zoo, by taking her home and nursing, the pneumonia-stricken ape back to health. The following year, Reuther allowed the baby gorilla named Hanabi-Ko, better known as Koko, to become the centerpiece of a project by Stanford University graduate student Francine Patterson, who famously went on to teach Koko to communicate through sign language. "Ron was the one who was crucial to allow the project to start, and the rest is history," said Lorraine Slater, executive director of the "Gorilla Foundation of Woodside" and http://www.koko.org. "I think he understood apes in a way few people did at the time. He was very dedicated in caring for them."

Reuther remained at the San Francisco Zoo until 1973 when he became president and executive director of the Philadelphia Zoo. Reuther then retired in 1978.

During his years as a zoo manager, Ronald Reuther was a member of the Association of Zoos and Aquariums. Reuther served on the board of directors from 1965 to 1971, served on many committees, and was editor of the AZA newsletter. From 1968 to 1970 Reuther was president of the AZA. Two publications were created during his tenure: Zoological Park Fundamentals, and Zookeeper Training: A suggested Guide for Instructors.

== Aviation ==
After retirement, Ronald Reuther returned to his love of airplanes. He lectured on aviation operations and management for Golden Gate University, and on aeronautics at Sierra Academy of Aeronautics, a school for professional pilots. Reuther co-authored two books with William Larkins: San Francisco Bay Area Aviation, and Oakland Aviation. "He had a great interest in aviation history, as well as flying, and a special interest in the aviation history of the Bay Area and Northern California," said Larkins.

In 1981, Reuther founded the Western Aerospace Museum, now known as the Oakland Aviation Museum. As founder, president, and executive director, Reuther was instrumental in the creation of the 100,000-square-foot (9,300 m^{2}) museum, which includes exhibits on the history of Oakland International Airport, women in aviation, and notable flyers like the Tuskegee Airmen. In the museum's collection is the "flying boat" used in the film Raiders of the Lost Ark.

Reuther was particularly knowledgeable about flight pioneer Amelia Earhart. He was fascinated by the circumstances of Earhart's disappearance and was an active member of the worldwide Amelia Earhart Society. Reuther organized four of the society's conferences in the Bay Area, and lectured about the subject at educational institutions. In 2002, Reuther organized a gathering in Oakland, California, and led a tour of places Earhart had visited before her final flight in 1937.

Reuther was also a member of the Northern California Chapter of the Explorers Club, and served as its president from 1989 to 1995.

Reuther died on October 4, 2007, of colon cancer.
