= Bay Alarm =

California-based security company

- Founded: 1946
- Headquarters: Concord, California
- Key people: Tim Westphal (CEO)
- Services: Fire alarms, burglar alarms, video surveillance, access control
- Website: www.bayalarm.com

Bay Alarm is a private American security company based in Concord, CA. Founded by Marjorie and Everett Westphal in 1946, the company is currently owned and operated by their grandson Tim Westphal. Bay Alarm provides commercial security and fire alarm systems, video surveillance, and security guard services across California, Arizona, and Washington.

Bay Alarm Medical, a separate company owned by different members of the Westphal family, provides medical alert systems for seniors.

== History ==
In 1946, Marjorie and Everett Westphal founded Bay Alarm as a small burglar alarm company in the California Bay Area. The company was initially operated out of the Westphal's Oakland home. In 1956, the company opened its first central office on East 14th Street in Oakland. Sons Roger and Bruce Westphal later took over company operations.

During the late 1960s, Bay Alarm developed and manufactured alarm system equipment under the label Alarm Equipment Co, or ALECO. Bruce Westphal patented an additional alarm loop circuit system in 1971.

In 1982, Bay Alarm joined 29 other alarm companies in filing an antitrust suit against AT&T. The suit maintained that AT&T forced alarm companies to use products made by AT&T's subsidiary company Bell Labs when cheaper equipment was available. The suit also claimed that AT&T filed excessive tariffs and raised rates on special lines used for alarm signals. The alarm companies sought a combined $200 million in damages.

In September 2001, Bay Alarm was contracted to design and implement a security system for the Micke Grove Zoo following the kidnapping of two endangered cotton-topped tamarins.

In April 2016, Bay Alarm moved its headquarters from Pacheco, CA to its current location in Concord, CA. The 60,000-square-ft-building was formerly home to the Heald Business College.

In 2020, Bay Alarm employees raised $50,000 for the Make-A-Wish foundation.

On June 6, 2024, the city of San Diego renewed a contract with Bay Alarm to continue providing security system monitoring services at various locations in downtown San Diego.

== Acquisitions ==
According to its website, Bay Alarm has acquired over 40 alarm companies in the last 50 years. Many of these acquisitions have been of family-owned companies including Low Voltage Systems, SDA Security, and Bond Alarm.

== Operations ==
Bay Alarm provides security services to 150,000 businesses and residents across 16 locations in California, Arizona, and Washington. In addition to home protection, the company offers fire alarm and security solutions for commercial businesses, construction sites, warehouses, schools, and government facilities. Bay Alarm installs and monitors burglar alarms, fire alarms, video security and access control systems.
