= Micke Grove Zoo =

Small zoo in Lodi, California

- Interactive map of Micke Grove Zoo
- 38°04′45″N 121°16′19″W
- Date opened: 1957
- Location: Lodi, California, United States
- Land area: 5 acres (2.0 ha)
- Website: www.mgzoo.com

Micke Grove Zoo is a small 5-acre (2.0 ha) zoo that opened in 1957 in Lodi, California. It is located within Micke Grove Regional Park, which includes a Japanese Garden, the San Joaquin County Historical Society and Museum, an amusement park, and picnic shelters and Frisbee golf.

== History ==
In 1938, the Micke family donated the 258-acre (104 ha) oak tree park to the county of San Joaquin. The zoo opened in 1957 and Ronald Theodore Reuther was its first curator. The zoo, like other aspects of the park complex, was dedicated to Micke's wife who died in 1952.

Most of the early zoo was built by William C. Hoegerman. Micke added 24 cages to the zoo in 1958 to house two African lions, a Bengal tiger, three Malayan sun bears, four California bears, four chimpanzees, a baboon, a mandrill, as well as peacocks and other birds. The new cages included radiant heating for the chimpanzees and bathing pools for the bears. Hoegerman also installed a large aviary with sixteen cages and generous flight space.

By 1981, the American Association of Zoological Parks and Aquariums had cancelled the zoo's accreditation because of its outdated, cramped facilities. The county Board of Supervisors considered means to raise the money for improvements, including charging admission and seeking contributions from the public.

In 1985, 400,000 visitors toured the zoo. In 1986, the zoo renovated its Monkey Island and added a family of ruffed lemurs to its collection. A more naturalistic habitat for the lemurs began construction in 1989. The zoo was again remodeled in 1997 with a conservation perspective, as the Micke Grove Zoo was a participant in the Species Survival Plan. However, the zoo lost its accreditation in April 2006 due to aging exhibits and cramped veterinarian space.

The zoo was shut down for a short time in 2016 due to a strike by Service Employee International Union 1021. In 2018, the zoo again lost its accreditation.

In 2019, a civil grand jury found that San Joaquin County had relied too heavily on trust funds to support the zoo's budget and recommended that it work with the Zoological Society to reach a revised operating agreement, pursue additional funding sources for improvements, and seek "affordable accreditation". The Zoological Society sued the county in 2020 when its members were locked out of the zoo. The previous operating agreement between the society and the county had been terminated while the parties were working on a revised agreement.

In February, 2021, the zoo reopened after being closed for the COVID-19 pandemic.

Currently, it is home to native animals and exotic species, some of which are endangered, and was at one point the smallest zoo accredited by the Association of Zoos and Aquariums.

== Animals ==
Included in the current collection are a variety of non-releasable raptors, tortoises, and a variety of lemurs,. Many endangered primates and birds can also be found at the zoo, including parrots and tortoises from Madagascar. As of 2014, a snow leopard has been added. Expansion originally planned in 2010 was to include Oriental small-clawed otters and an expanded snow leopard habitat, however construction was halted midway and it has been postponed until additional funding can be found.

Micke Grove Zoo participates an international Species Survival Plan (SSP Program) to help ensure the survival of wildlife that are endangered or critically endangered in the wild. Micke Grove Zoo has made significant contributions to the SSP Program through captive breeding of Golden Lion Tamarin, Chilean Pudu, and Waldrapp Ibis.

== Education ==
Educational programs are funded with support of the Micke Grove Zoological Society. Important school based programs include six weeks of private zoo camp offered for San Joaquin County students, five weeks of public zoo camp; Animal Discovery Tours, and off-site Zoo Mobile programs. Their most popular programs and events include Zoo After Dark, Zoo Tots, Toys for Critters, and HalloWILD.
