= List of United States Supreme Court cases, volume 248 =

Supreme Court of the United States
- Interactive map of Supreme Court of the United States
- 38°53′26″N 77°00′16″W
- Established: March 4, 1789; 236 years ago
- Location: Washington, D.C.
- Coordinates: 38°53′26″N 77°00′16″W
- Composition method: Presidential nomination with Senate confirmation
- Authorised by: Constitution of the United States, Art. III, § 1
- Judge term length: life tenure, subject to impeachment and removal
- Number of positions: 9 (by statute)
- Website: supremecourt.gov

This is a list of cases reported in volume 248 of United States Reports, decided by the Supreme Court of the United States in 1918 and 1919.

== Justices of the Supreme Court at the time of volume 248 U.S. ==
The Supreme Court is established by Article III, Section 1 of the Constitution of the United States, which says: "The judicial Power of the United States, shall be vested in one supreme Court . . .". The size of the Court is not specified; the Constitution leaves it to Congress to set the number of justices. Under the Judiciary Act of 1789 Congress originally fixed the number of justices at six (one chief justice and five associate justices). Since 1789 Congress has varied the size of the Court from six to seven, nine, ten, and back to nine justices (always including one chief justice).

When the cases in volume 248 were decided the Court comprised the following nine members:

Portrait	Justice	Office	Home State	Succeeded	Date confirmed by the Senate (Vote)	Tenure on Supreme Court
	Edward Douglass White	Chief Justice	Louisiana	Melville Fuller	December 12, 1910 (Acclamation)	December 19, 1910 – May 19, 1921 (Died)
	Joseph McKenna	Associate Justice	California	Stephen Johnson Field	January 21, 1898 (Acclamation)	January 26, 1898 – January 5, 1925 (Retired)
	Oliver Wendell Holmes Jr.	Associate Justice	Massachusetts	Horace Gray	December 4, 1902 (Acclamation)	December 8, 1902 – January 12, 1932 (Retired)
	William R. Day	Associate Justice	Ohio	George Shiras Jr.	February 23, 1903 (Acclamation)	March 2, 1903 – November 13, 1922 (Retired)
	Willis Van Devanter	Associate Justice	Wyoming	Edward Douglass White (as Associate Justice)	December 15, 1910 (Acclamation)	January 3, 1911 – June 2, 1937 (Retired)
	Mahlon Pitney	Associate Justice	New Jersey	John Marshall Harlan	March 13, 1912 (50–26)	March 18, 1912 – December 31, 1922 (Resigned)
	James Clark McReynolds	Associate Justice	Tennessee	Horace Harmon Lurton	August 29, 1914 (44–6)	October 12, 1914 – January 31, 1941 (Retired)
	Louis Brandeis	Associate Justice	Massachusetts	Joseph Rucker Lamar	June 1, 1916 (47–22)	June 5, 1916 – February 13, 1939 (Retired)
	John Hessin Clarke	Associate Justice	Ohio	Charles Evans Hughes	July 24, 1916 (Acclamation)	October 9, 1916 – September 18, 1922 (Retired)

== Citation style ==
Under the Judiciary Act of 1789 the federal court structure at the time comprised District Courts, which had general trial jurisdiction; Circuit Courts, which had mixed trial and appellate (from the US District Courts) jurisdiction; and the United States Supreme Court, which had appellate jurisdiction over the federal District and Circuit courts—and for certain issues over state courts. The Supreme Court also had limited original jurisdiction (i.e., in which cases could be filed directly with the Supreme Court without first having been heard by a lower federal or state court). There were one or more federal District Courts and/or Circuit Courts in each state, territory, or other geographical region.

The Judiciary Act of 1891 created the United States Courts of Appeals and reassigned the jurisdiction of most routine appeals from the district and circuit courts to these appellate courts. The Act created nine new courts that were originally known as the "United States Circuit Courts of Appeals." The new courts had jurisdiction over most appeals of lower court decisions. The Supreme Court could review either legal issues that a court of appeals certified or decisions of court of appeals by writ of certiorari. On January 1, 1912, the effective date of the Judicial Code of 1911, the old Circuit Courts were abolished, with their remaining trial court jurisdiction transferred to the U.S. District Courts.

Bluebook citation style is used for case names, citations, and jurisdictions.

- "# Cir." = United States Court of Appeals
  - e.g., "3d Cir." = United States Court of Appeals for the Third Circuit
- "D." = United States District Court for the District of . . .
  - e.g.,"D. Mass." = United States District Court for the District of Massachusetts
- "E." = Eastern; "M." = Middle; "N." = Northern; "S." = Southern; "W." = Western
  - e.g.,"M.D. Ala." = United States District Court for the Middle District of Alabama
- "Ct. Cl." = United States Court of Claims
- The abbreviation of a state's name alone indicates the highest appellate court in that state's judiciary at the time.
  - e.g.,"Pa." = Supreme Court of Pennsylvania
  - e.g.,"Me." = Supreme Judicial Court of Maine

== List of cases in volume 248 U.S. ==
Case Name	Page and year	Opinion of the Court	Concurring opinion(s)	Dissenting opinion(s)	Lower Court	Disposition of case
Pittsburgh Melting Company v. Totten	1 (1918)	Day	none	none	3d Cir.	affirmed
Watts, Watts and Company, Ltd. v. v. Unione Austriaca di Navigazione	9 (1918)	Brandeis	none	none	2d Cir.	reversed
King v. Putnam Investment Company	23 (1918)	White	none	none	Kan.	dismissed
Lay v. Lay	24 (1918)	White	none	none	Miss.	affirmed
Georgia v. Cincinnati Southern Railway Company	26 (1918)	Holmes	none	none	original	dismissed
Detroit and Mackinac Railway Company v. Fletcher Paper Company	30 (1918)	Holmes	none	none	Mich.	affirmed
Palmer v. Ohio	32 (1918)	Clarke	none	none	Ohio	dismissed
Orr v. Allen	35 (1918)	White	none	none	S.D. Ohio	affirmed
E.W. Bliss Company v. United States	37 (1918)	McKenna	none	none	2d Cir.	affirmed
Van Dyke v. Eastern Railroad Company	49 (1918)	McKenna	none	none	Ariz.	affirmed
Buckeye Powder Company v. E.I. DuPont de Nemours Powder Company	55 (1918)	Holmes	none	none	3d Cir.	affirmed
Watters v. Michigan	65 (1918)	Holmes	none	none	Mich.	affirmed
Union Pacific Railroad Company v. Public Service Commission of Missouri	67 (1918)	Holmes	none	none	Mo.	reversed
Gulf Oil Corporation v. Lewellyn	71 (1918)	Holmes	none	none	3d Cir.	reversed
Sterrett v. Second National Bank of Cincinnati	73 (1918)	Day	none	none	6th Cir.	affirmed
Alaska Pacific Fisheries v. United States	78 (1918)	VanDevanter	none	none	9th Cir.	affirmed
United Drug Company v. Theodore Rectanus Company	90 (1918)	Pitney	none	none	6th Cir.	affirmed
Ruddy v. Rossi	104 (1918)	McReynolds	Holmes	none	Idaho	reversed
Payne v. Kansas ex rel. Brewster	112 (1918)	McReynolds	none	none	Kan.	affirmed
Nicoulin v. O'Brien	113 (1918)	McReynolds	none	none	Ky.	affirmed
Iowa v. Slimmer	115 (1918)	Brandeis	none	none	original	motion to file denied
Tempel v. United States	121 (1918)	Brandeis	none	none	N.D. Ill.	reversed
United States v. Spearin	132 (1918)	Brandeis	none	none	Ct. Cl.	affirmed
Luckenbach v. W.J. McCahan Sugar Refining Company	139 (1918)	Brandeis	none	none	2d Cir.	affirmed
MacMath v. United States	151 (1918)	Brandeis	none	none	Ct. Cl.	affirmed
Petrie v. Nampa and Meridian Irrigation District	154 (1918)	Clarke	none	none	Idaho	dismissed
Pure Oil Company v. Minnesota	158 (1918)	Clarke	none	none	Minn.	affirmed
Wells Fargo and Company v. Nevada	165 (1918)	VanDevanter	none	none	Nev.	affirmed
Campbell v. Wadsworth	169 (1918)	Clarke	none	none	Okla.	reversed
Cleveland-Cliffs Iron Company v. Arctic Iron Company	178 (1918)	White	none	Clarke	6th Cir.	dismissed
Dillon v. Strathearn Steamship Company	182 (1918)	Day	none	none	5th Cir.	dismissed
Sandberg v. McDonald	185 (1918)	Day	none	McKenna	5th Cir.	affirmed
Neilson v. Rhine Shipping Company	205 (1918)	Day	none	McKenna	2d Cir.	affirmed
International News Service v. Associated Press	215 (1918)	Pitney	none	none	2d Cir.	affirmed
Farson Son and Company v. Bird	268 (1919)	White	none	none	Ala.	dismissed
Andrews v. Virginian Railway Company	272 (1919)	White	none	none	Va. Cir. Ct.	dismissed
Missouri Pacific Railroad Company v. Kansas	276 (1919)	White	none	none	Kan.	affirmed
Weigle v. Curtice Brothers Company	285 (1919)	Holmes	none	none	W.D. Wis.	reversed
Flexner v. Farson	289 (1919)	Holmes	none	none	Ill.	affirmed
Englewood v. Denver and South Platte Railway Company	294 (1919)	Holmes	none	none	Colo.	dismissed
Hebe Company v. Shaw	297 (1919)	Holmes	none	Day	S.D. Ohio	affirmed
Union Fish Company v. Erickson	308 (1919)	Day	none	none	9th Cir.	affirmed
Fisher v. Rule	314 (1919)	VanDevanter	none	none	8th Cir.	affirmed
Danciger v. Cooley	319 (1919)	VanDevanter	none	none	Kan.	affirmed
Leary v. City of Jersey City	328 (1919)	Pitney	none	none	3d Cir.	affirmed
Guerini Stone Company v. P.J. Carlin Construction Company	334 (1919)	Pitney	none	none	1st Cir.	reversed
United States v. Comyns	349 (1919)	Pitney	none	none	W.D. Wash.	reversed
Turner v. United States	354 (1919)	Brandeis	none	none	Ct. Cl.	affirmed
Chicago, Rock Island and Pacific Railroad Company v. Maucher	359 (1919)	Brandeis	none	none	Neb.	dismissed
Missouri, Kansas & Texas Railway Company v. Sealy	363 (1919)	Brandeis	none	none	Kan.	dismissed
Merchants Exchange of St. Louis v. Missouri ex rel. Barker	365 (1919)	Brandeis	none	none	Mo.	affirmed
Erie Railroad Company v. Hamilton	369 (1919)	Clarke	none	none	N.Y. Sup. Ct.	dismissed
Union Dry Goods Company v. Georgia Public Service Corporation	372 (1919)	Clarke	none	none	Ga.	affirmed
Allanwilde Transport Corporation v. Vacuum Oil Company	377 (1919)	McKenna	none	none	3d Cir.	certification
International Paper Company v. The Gracie D. Chambers	387 (1919)	McKenna	none	none	2d Cir.	affirmed
Standard Varnish Works v. Steamship "Bris	392 (1919)	McKenna	none	none	2d Cir.	certification
Fink v. Muskogee County	399 (1919)	McKenna	none	none	Okla.	affirmed
Cochnower v. United States	405 (1919)	McKenna	none	none	Ct. Cl.	reversed
Fullinwider v. Southern Pacific Railroad Company	409 (1919)	McKenna	none	none	9th Cir.	affirmed
Cordova v. Grant	413 (1919)	Holmes	none	none	W.D. Tex.	dismissed
United States v. Hill	420 (1919)	Day	none	McReynolds	S.D.W. Va.	reversed
Detroit United Railway Company v. City of Detroit	429 (1919)	Day	none	Clarke	E.D. Mich.	reversed
Southern Pacific Railroad Company v. Stewart	446 (1919)	McReynolds	none	none	9th Cir.	reversed
Cohn v. Malone	450 (1919)	McReynolds	none	none	5th Cir.	affirmed
Cavanaugh v. Looney	453 (1919)	McReynolds	none	none	N.D. Tex.	affirmed
Coon v. Kennedy	457 (1919)	McReynolds	none	none	N.J.	dismissed
J. Homer Fritch, Inc. v. United States	458 (1919)	White	none	none	9th Cir.	reversed
La Tourette v. McMaster	465 (1919)	McKenna	none	none	S.C.	affirmed
Postal Telegraph Cable Company v. Tonopah and Tidewater Railroad Company	471 (1919)	Holmes	none	none	multiple	affirmed
Bank of California, N.A. v. Richardson	476 (1919)	White	none	Pitney	Cal.	reversed
Bank of California, N.A. v. Roberts	497 (1919)	per curiam	none	none	Cal.	reversed
Pierce Oil Corporation v. City of Hope	498 (1919)	Holmes	none	none	Ark.	affirmed
Mount Saint Mary's Cemetery Association v. Mullins	501 (1919)	Day	none	none	Mo.	affirmed
United States v. New Orleans Pacific Railway Company	507 (1919)	VanDevanter	none	none	5th Cir.	multiple
Oelwerke Teutonia v. Erlanger	521 (1919)	Holmes	none	none	Phil.	affirmed
Central of Georgia Railway Company v. Wright	525 (1919)	Holmes	none	none	Ga.	reversed
