= McGregor W. Scott =

American lawyer (born 1962)

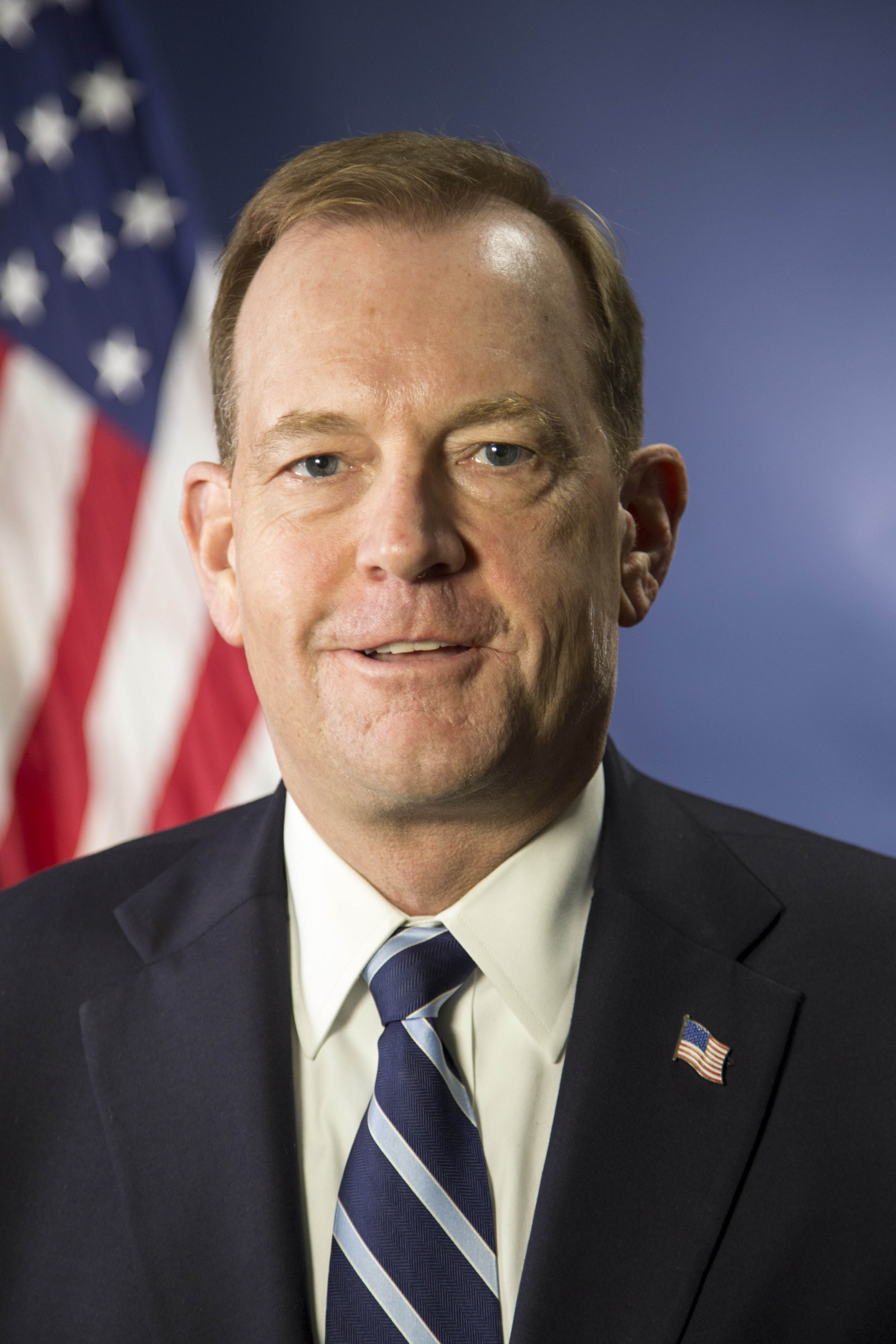

Fraud Special Counsel for the Cal OES and EDD
- Incumbent
- Assumed office July 20, 2021
- Appointed by: Gavin Newsom
- Preceded by: Position established

United States Attorney for the Eastern District of California
- In office December 29, 2017 – February 28, 2021
- President: Donald Trump; Joe Biden
- Preceded by: Phillip Talbert
- Succeeded by: Phillip Talbert
- In office 2003–2009
- President: George W. Bush
- Preceded by: Paul L. Seave
- Succeeded by: Benjamin B. Wagner

District Attorney of Shasta County
- In office 1997–2003
- Preceded by: Dennis J. Sheehy
- Succeeded by: Gerald C. Benito

Personal details
- Born: McGregor William Scott; 1962 (age 63–64) Mountain View, California, U.S.
- Party: Republican
- Spouse: Jennifer
- Children: 3
- Education: Santa Clara University (BA); University of California, Hastings College of the Law (JD)

McGregor William "Greg" Scott (born 1962) is an American lawyer and partner at the King & Spalding law firm. He served as the United States attorney for the Eastern District of California from 2017 to 2021. He was sworn in as a court-appointed U.S. attorney on December 29, 2017, after previously serving in the position from 2003 to 2009 during the George W. Bush administration. Prior to assuming his current role, Scott was a partner in the Sacramento office of Orrick, Herrington & Sutcliffe, where his practice focused on white collar criminal defense and corporate investigations. In 2008, he retired from the United States Army Reserve as a lieutenant colonel after 23 years of service.

== Education and early career ==
Scott received a Bachelor of Arts from Santa Clara University and a Juris Doctor from the University of California, Hastings College of the Law. He served as deputy district attorney in Contra Costa County from 1989 to 1997 and the elected Shasta County District Attorney from 1997 to 2003. As district attorney for Shasta County, Scott oversaw the prosecution of brothers Benjamin Matthew Williams and James Tyler Williams, who murdered a gay couple in Redding and set fire to three synagogues and an abortion clinic.

== Career ==
=== Orrick, Herrington & Sutcliffe ===
In a trade secrets misappropriation case, Scott won a $52.9 million jury verdict against Patriot Rail Company on behalf of his client, Sierra Railroad. He worked pro bono for Jaycee Lee Dugard, who was kidnapped in 1991 and rescued from her captor in 2009.

=== U.S. attorney ===
In November 2017, Scott was appointed by President Donald Trump to a four-year term as U.S. attorney for the Eastern District of California. He was confirmed by a voice vote by the United States Senate on March 7, 2018. During his previous tenure, Scott's office prosecuted a number of mortgage fraud cases during the 2008 financial crisis, won a $102 million settlement with Union Pacific Railroad over allegations that railroad workers sparked a large wildfire, and prosecuted Hamid and Umer Hayat for allegedly providing material support for terrorism and lying about it to the Federal Bureau of Investigation. At the time of the $102 million settlement with Union Pacific Railroad, it was the largest civil settlement in the district's history. He subsequently encouraged the United States Department of Justice to create a program to pursue damages against companies that start fires that damage federal forests. Scott also served on an advisory committee that offered counsel to United States Attorneys General John Ashcroft and Alberto Gonzales.

The editorial board of The Sacramento Bee endorsed Scott's most recent nomination to become U.S. attorney, writing "Trump could not have found a more qualified chief federal prosecutor for the sprawling district."

On February 8, 2021, he along with 55 other Trump-era United States attorneys were asked to resign. On February 10, 2021, Scott announced his resignation, effective February 28.

=== King & Spalding ===
In June 2021, Scott joined international law firm King & Spalding as a partner working out of the Sacramento and San Francisco offices.

=== Fraud special counsel ===
On July 20, 2021, California Governor Gavin Newsom, the Employment Development Department (EDD) and the Governor's Office of Emergency Services Fraud Task Force appointed Scott as "fraud special counsel" to investigate unemployment fraud against the EDD during the COVID-19 pandemic.
