= Benjamin B. Wagner =

American lawyer

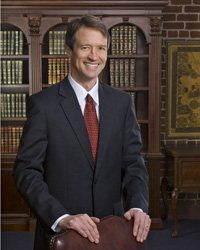

United States Attorney for the Eastern District of California
- In office November 6, 2009 – April 30, 2016
- President: Barack Obama
- Preceded by: Lawrence G. Brown
- Succeeded by: Phillip Talbert (acting)

Personal details
- Children: 3
- Education: Dartmouth College; New York University School of Law
- Profession: Attorney

Benjamin B. Wagner is an American attorney who served as the United States Attorney for the Eastern District of California from 2009 to 2016. He was appointed in 2009 by President Barack Obama, replacing interim U.S. Attorney Lawrence G. Brown. As one of 93 U.S. Attorneys nationwide, he represented the United States in all civil and criminal cases within his district.

Wagner attended Dartmouth College and New York University School of Law, graduating in 1982 and 1986, respectively. At NYU, he served as managing editor of the New York University Journal of International Law and Politics. He began his legal career as an associate at Cahill, Gordon & Reindel in New York City in 1987. In 1992, he left to join the Office of the United States Attorney for the Eastern District of California. Over the course of his career as a federal prosecutor, he has served as Chief of the Special Prosecutions Unit, Hate Crimes Coordinator, and Anti-Terrorism Coordinator. From 2005 to 2006, he served as the Justice Department Resident Legal Adviser in Jakarta, Indonesia. He has conducted eighteen jury trials.

He has since worked for Gibson Dunn Law Offices and serves on the Board of Trustees of Menlo College.

Political offices
Preceded by Lawrence G. Brown	United States Attorney for the Eastern District of California; 2009–2016	Succeeded by Phillip Talbert
