= Missouri Pacific Railway Co. v. Kansas =

- Supreme Court of the United States

Decided January 7, 1919
- Full case name: Missouri Pacific Railway Co. v. Kansas
- Citations: 248 U.S. 276 (more)

Holding
- Congress's power to override a presidential veto requires only two-thirds of a quorum in each house to support it, not two-thirds of all the members of each house.

Court membership
- Chief Justice Edward D. White Associate Justices Joseph McKenna · Oliver W. Holmes Jr. William R. Day · Willis Van Devanter; Mahlon Pitney · James C. McReynolds; Louis Brandeis · John H. Clarke

Case opinion
- Majority: White, joined by unanimous

Laws applied
- Presentment Clause

Missouri Pacific Railway Co. v. Kansas, 248 U.S. 276 (1919), was a United States Supreme Court case in which the court held that congress's power to override a presidential veto requires only two-thirds of a quorum in each house to support it, not two-thirds of all the members of each house.
