= New York University Journal of International Law and Politics =

- Discipline: Law
- Language: English
- Edited by: Heather McAdams

Publication details
- History: 1968–present
- Publisher: New York University School of Law (United States)
- Frequency: Quarterly

Standard abbreviations
- Bluebook: N.Y.U. J. Int'l L. & Pol.
- ISO 4: N. Y. Univ. J. Int. Law Politics

Indexing
- ISSN: 0028-7873 (print); 1930-6237 (web)
- LCCN: 70003415
- OCLC no.: 2251321

Links
- Journal homepage

The New York University Journal of International Law and Politics is a student-edited international law review at New York University School of Law. The journal publishes articles, essays, notes, and commentary that cover a wide range of topics in international and comparative law.

== History ==
The New York University Journal of International Law and Politics was established in 1968 with the aid of a Ford Foundation grant. It features articles on international legal topics, as well as notes, case comments, and book annotations written by journal members.

From 1985 to 1986, the Managing Editor of the Journal was Benjamin B. Wagner, current United States Attorney for the Eastern District of California.

== Content ==
The journal publishes four issues per year on diverse topics in both public and private international law. Recent issues have included articles on international human rights law, privatization in Eastern Europe and Latin America, international aspects of intellectual property law, the future of nationalism, and asset securitization in Japan. Recent contributors include: Sandra Day O'Connor, Mohammed Bedjaoui, Stephen M. Schwebel, Jagdish Bhagwati, Shimon Peres, Kofi Annan, and three Justices from the Constitutional Court of South Africa: Arthur Chaskalson, Richard Goldstone, and Albie Sachs.

The journal is the creator and publisher of the Guide to Foreign and International Citation. This international citation manual provides information on the appropriate citation of foreign, multinational, and international sources, including the publications of organizations such as the United Nations and the World Trade Organization.

== Events ==
Since 1982, the New York University Journal of International Law and Politics hosts an annual symposium on an important topic of international law. Recent topics have included climate change, financing development, governance, nuclear power, and other issues.
