= Hamid and Umer Hayat =

Hamid Hayat (born September 10, 1982) is a United States citizen of Pakistani descent from Lodi, California. His father, Umer Hayat (born 1957 or 1958), immigrated to the United States from Pakistan and is a naturalized U.S. citizen. Together, they were the subjects of the first terrorism trial in the state of California. Both were alleged to be part of, or associated with, a terrorist sleeper cell.

Of the five men accused of membership in the purported terrorist cell, three were deported without charges. A jury was unable to reach a decision on whether Umer Hayat had lied about his son's purported participation in a terrorist training camp during a visit to Pakistan; he pleaded guilty to a customs violation. Hamid Hayat was convicted in 2006 and served 14 years of a 24-year prison sentence before his conviction was overturned in July 2019 by the same judge, after exonerating witness testimony was presented in court. The judge faulted the defense he had received at his original trial. In February 2020, the government moved to dismiss all charges against him.

== Background ==
Umer Hayat came to the United States at the age of 18 in 1976 from Behboodi, a village in Pakistan, and settled in Lodi, California, where he became a naturalized citizen and after working as a fruit picker bought an ice cream truck. Hamid Hayat is the eldest of four children born in California to Hamid and his wife Oma, the daughter of Qari Saeed-ur-Rehman, an Islamic scholar with a madrassah in Rawalpindi; in 1991, when he was 9, his father sent him to Pakistan to live with his grandparents, but in 2000, after contracting meningitis, he returned to Lodi. In April 2003, he returned to Pakistan with his parents; Umer Hayat planned to build a house in Behboodi and Oma Hayat had medical treatment in Rawalpindi. He had an arranged marriage in Behboodi in 2004 and flew back to the United States in May 2005 with his parents and two sisters, intending to arrange a visa for his wife so that she could join him in Lodi.

Hamid Hayat was a poor, unmotivated student who became known as a fabulist during his first residence in Pakistan. In summer 2002, at the mosque his family attended in Lodi, he was befriended by Naseem Khan, a Pakistani-born FBI informant; Hamid Hayat expressed approval of the killing of Daniel Pearl by Pakistani terrorists, saying "That was a good job they did. Now they can't send one Jewish person to Pakistan", showed Khan a scrapbook of newspaper clippings about Pakistani politics and Islamic fundamentalism, and falsely told him that his grandfather's madrassa had terrorist connections, that he knew about a terrorist training camp in Mansehra District, and that he planned to attend such a camp himself when his family returned to Pakistan. He also told an undercover FBI agent that his uncle was king of Pakistan. Khan called Hamid Hayat while he was in Pakistan and upbraided him for not following through with his pledge to attend a terrorist training camp; Hayat later said that he had told Khan that he had lied about intending to do so.

== Terrorism charges and trials ==
When the Hayats returned to the United States in May 2005, the second leg of their flight was diverted to Tokyo, where they were removed from the aircraft and an FBI agent questioned Hamid Hayat about possible terrorist associations; they were allowed to continue to California. On June 3, FBI agents came to the family house in Lodi and questioned Hamid, who was working at a warehouse packing cherries, as well as his father. Both men presented themselves the following day at the FBI office in Sacramento, where Hamid was questioned for 16 hours without a lawyer. He eventually stopped denying and confessed to having attended a terrorist training camp near Balakot, later described by James Wedick, a former FBI agent who assisted his defense in his retrial, as the "sorriest confession" he had ever seen, coaxed with leading questions. Recording did not start until Hamid began to confess. (In response to an interview with Wedick aired on the PBS program Frontline in 2006, the FBI responded that the portions of the interview critiqued by Wedick had been mostly conducted after the confession, in an effort to gain a better understanding of any terrorism threats and to fill in the intelligence picture.) The FBI later said that they had not investigated Hamid's activities in Pakistan because they did not have resources there; Wedick also said that there were joint FBI-Pakistani investigations of terrorism under way at the time. After being told his son had confessed, Umer Hayat also confessed, but described the training camp in a way that was difficult to reconcile with Hamid's statements.

In a news conference on June 8, 2005, U.S. Attorney McGregor Scott, in charge of the Lodi investigation, spoke of an Al-Qaeda cell operating in Lodi that had been planning attacks on civilian targets such as grocery stores. In addition to Umer and Hamid Hayat, three others were originally accused of being part of the purported terrorist cell, but were deported without charges, including the Lodi mosque's two imams, who were Pakistanis in the United States on religious worker visas.

Umer and Hamid Hayat were tried in federal court in Sacramento before separate juries; the trial began in February 2006.

In an indictment filed on January 26, 2006, Hamid Hayat was charged with providing material support to terrorists and with making false statements to FBI agents. The prosecution alleged that he had spent much of his recent two years in Pakistan at an al-Qaeda training camp and had returned to the United States intending to attack civilian targets there. U.S. District Judge Garland E. Burrell Jr. refused permission for Wedick to appear as an expert witness. One piece of evidence presented during the trial was a ta'wiz, a protective amulet that Hamid Hayat said he had been given in Pakistan; the prayer inside, which he said he had not read, was translated as reading "Oh Allah, we place you at their throats, and we seek refuge in you from their evils." and interpreted by an expert witness, Khaleel Mohammed of San Diego State University, as indicating a jihadist "in the act of being a warrior". On April 25, 2006, a jury voted to convict Hamid Hayat on one count of providing material support or resources to terrorists and three counts of making false statements to the FBI in matters related to international or domestic terrorism. On September 10, 2007, his 25th birthday, he was sentenced to 24 years in prison. He was confined in a Communications Management Unit in Terre Haute, Indiana, which had been nicknamed "Little Gitmo".

Umer Hayat was charged with two counts of making false statements to the FBI. His trial ended in a hung jury. He was released to home detention pending retrial on May 1, 2006, and subsequently pled guilty to a customs violation in exchange for release with time served. Prosecutors had made much of how Umer Hayat had more money than they considered normal for an ice cream truck driver; in granting him bail, the judge said he "appear[ed] to have access to a significant amount of cash from an unexplained source."

== Petitions for a fresh trial of Hamid Hayat ==
After Hamid Hayat's conviction, Wedick spoke to a juror who had appeared reluctant to affirm the guilty verdict; the juror told Wedick that the jury foreman had pressured her and made "racial" remarks, apparently against Muslims, and a noose-tying gesture; two other jurors also said the foreman had made racial slurs, but he denied it. The foreman contacted an excused alternative juror during deliberations. Johnny Griffin, who had defended Umer Hayat, was a former prosecutor; Hamid Hayat's attorney, Wazhma Mojaddidi, spoke the Hayats' native languages, Urdu and Pashto, but had never previously defended a criminal case. Neither attorney had applied for a security clearance in order to view some of the government's evidence, to the surprise of the prosecution. Dennis Riordan, an attorney who had worked on cases tainted by jury misconduct, offered to work pro bono on behalf of Hayat and filed a motion for a retrial, alleging misconduct during the trial including by the jury foreman and that the judge's disallowing of testimony by Wedick and of a question about whether Hamid had told Khan he was lying about his intention to attend a terrorist training camp had prevented Hayat from receiving a fair trial. Burrell rejected the petition, writing in his opinion on May 17, 2007 that the foreman's action was not prejudicial, there was evidence that the jury "thoroughly and thoughtfully deliberated regarding Hayat's guilt or innocence", and the testimony was not necessary.

Together with his colleagues Don Horgan and Ted Sampsell-Jones and an Iranian American law school student, Layli Shirani, Riordan appealed Hayat's conviction to the Ninth U.S. Circuit Court of Appeals in San Francisco. A panel of three judges heard oral arguments in 2009 and denied the appeal in 2013; one of the three, A. Wallace Tashima, dissented, comparing the prayer to the Christian hymn "Onward Christian Soldiers". Hayat's wife's parents insisted on a divorce.

A petition for habeas corpus was filed on Hayat's behalf in 2014, by Riordan, Horgan, Sampsell-Jones, Shirani, and Martha Boersch, a former federal prosecutor, alleging that Mojaddidi's failure to call alibi witnesses who would have testified to Hayat's activities in Pakistan, or to present expert testimony on ta'wiz and on false confessions, together with the government's failure to recognize Hayat's innocence, including not examining the purported location of the training camp, meant the trial verdict should be vacated. Prosecutors offered Hamid Hayat a plea bargain to a lesser terrorism charge, with the possibility of release on a time served basis, which he rejected. The case was assigned to a magistrate judge in Redding; after that judge's retirement in 2016, it was reassigned to Judge Deborah Barnes of the Eastern District, who in 2017 granted an evidentiary hearing. At the hearing in January 2018, witnesses testifying on behalf of Hayat included four in Islamabad, the first use of video-link testimony in the district. Barnes' findings, released in January 2019, concluded that Mojaddidi's errors had violated Hayat's right to a fair trial and that the district court should vacate the verdict of his guilt. Barnes also faulted the agreement between Mojaddidi and Griffin under which Griffin dictated the defense strategy as a conflict of interest since Griffin was representing Umer Hayat. She rejected the argument that the government had withheld evidence that there was no camp near Balakot as based "purely on speculation".

== Reversal of verdict and release of Hamid Hayat ==
On July 30, 2019, the same district judge, Garland E. Burrell Jr., vacated Hamid Hayat's convictions and sentence on grounds of inadequate representation by Mojaddidi in not mounting an alibi defense. On August 9, he was released from FCI Phoenix, the Arizona prison where he had been transferred in 2011.

On February 14, 2020, the U.S. Government moved to dismiss all charges against Hayat.

The Hayats had sold their house in Lodi to pay legal bills and moved to Stockton. As of 2022, Hamid Hayat was living there and working at an Amazon warehouse. Umer Hayat had to retire after the stress of the year he spent in prison, and customer rejection because of the accusation of supporting terrorism.

== Analysis ==
The Lodi prosecutions are an example of the reaction to the 9/11 attacks, when the FBI, seeking to identify terrorists before they could act, investigated and accused many Muslims, particularly young men like Hamid Hayat. In a statement after the dismissal of charges, Basim Elkarra, executive director of the Sacramento Valley office of the Council on American-Islamic Relations, called Hayat's conviction an "egregious injustice" and said that "An entire community was left traumatized due to prosecution taking advantage of anti-Muslim, post-9/11 hysteria". The Hamid Hayat case has been cited as an example of anticipatory prosecution and a pre-crime conviction; in A. Wallace Tashima's dissent on Hayat's appeal, he characterized the government's case as "largely based on dire, but vague, predictions that [Hayat] might commit unspecified crimes in the future." It has also been discussed as an example of entrapment by an informant, with Khan having "push[ed]" Hayat for four years.

== In media ==
The allegations of a terrorist cell in Lodi were the subject of "The Enemy Within", a Season 24 episode of the PBS series Frontline, broadcast in 2006.

In 2019, Hamid Hayat's story was featured in Season 2 of Netflix's documentary series The Confession Tapes in an episode entitled "Marching Orders".
