= Severin doctrine =

The Severin doctrine, established in the 1943 case Severin v. United States, 99 Ct. Cl. 435, is a legal principle in United States federal contract law. It stipulates that a prime contractor cannot sue the federal government to recover damages incurred by a subcontractor unless the prime contractor is liable to the subcontractor for those damages.

== Background ==
In Severin v. United States, the Court of Claims held that for a prime contractor to pursue a “pass-through” claim on behalf of a subcontractor against the government, there must be a direct liability from the prime contractor to the subcontractor for the claimed damages. If the prime contractor has been absolved of liability to the subcontractor through contractual provisions or releases, the government cannot be held responsible for the subcontractor’s damages.

== Application ==
The Severin doctrine is particularly relevant in federal procurement and construction contracts involving multiple tiers of contractors. For a prime contractor to successfully present a subcontractor’s pass-through claim against the government, it must demonstrate either that it has reimbursed the subcontractor for the damages or that it remains liable for such reimbursement. Absent this liability, the claim is barred under the Severin doctrine.

== Limitations and interpretations ==
Courts have generally applied the Severin doctrine narrowly, requiring an “iron-bound release” or a contract provision that completely immunizes the prime contractor from liability to the subcontractor to preclude a pass-through claim. The burden of proof rests on the government to establish that the prime contractor is not liable to the subcontractor.

In practice, the doctrine’s applicability depends on the specific terms of the contracts and any releases executed between the prime contractor and subcontractor. For instance, broad language in subcontractor progress payment releases can potentially bar pass-through claims if they do not expressly reserve the subcontractor’s claims.

== See also ==
- United States v. Spearin
