= Micke Grove Regional Park =

Coordinates: 38°04′55″N 121°16′20″W

Micke Grove Regional Park is a 132-acre public park located in Lodi, California. Founded by the Micke family, the park was donated to San Joaquin County in 1938. Park features include the Micke Grove Zoo, the San Joaquin County Historical Society and Museum, and several gardens.

== History ==
William George Micke (1874–1961) and his wife Julia bought 464 acres of land south of Lodi and north of Stockton in 1920. Amidst their vineyards of tokay grapes was a 65-acre grove of oak trees. The idea of Micke Grove Park began in the late 1920s, when Micke offered the grove of oak trees to the local American Legion for their annual picnic, charging $1 a year for 10 years on the condition that the organization's members clear the brush and improve the grounds. Legionnaires gradually added an open-air dance floor and concession stands to the grove.

In the 1930s, workers employed by the Civil Works Administration and Works Progress Administration (New Deal programs to provide jobs during the Great Depression in the United States) built cement curbs and gutters, picnic benches, a baseball diamond, a cottage, comfort stations, a wading pool, lawns, horseshoe courts, softball courts, tennis courts, bocce ball courts, volleyball courts, and installed fencing.

Micke deeded the 65-acre grove to San Joaquin County on February 23, 1938. He would later increase his donation to include 145 additional acres. In 1953, Micke financed and constructed a swimming pool at the park, dedicated to his wife who died in 1952. The swimming pool replaced the original wading pool. The swimming pool was then replaced by a water feature in 2006.

In 1955, Micke added the Julia Harrison Micke Memorial women's lodge and auditorium, which he built in a T-shape to avoid removing any of the oak trees. Micke deeded the new structure to the county several weeks after its dedication. The zoo, which was also dedicated to Julia Micke, opened in 1957.

After Micke's death, the park was expanded to include the San Joaquin County Historical Society and Museum, as well as the Japanese and camellia gardens.

== Features ==
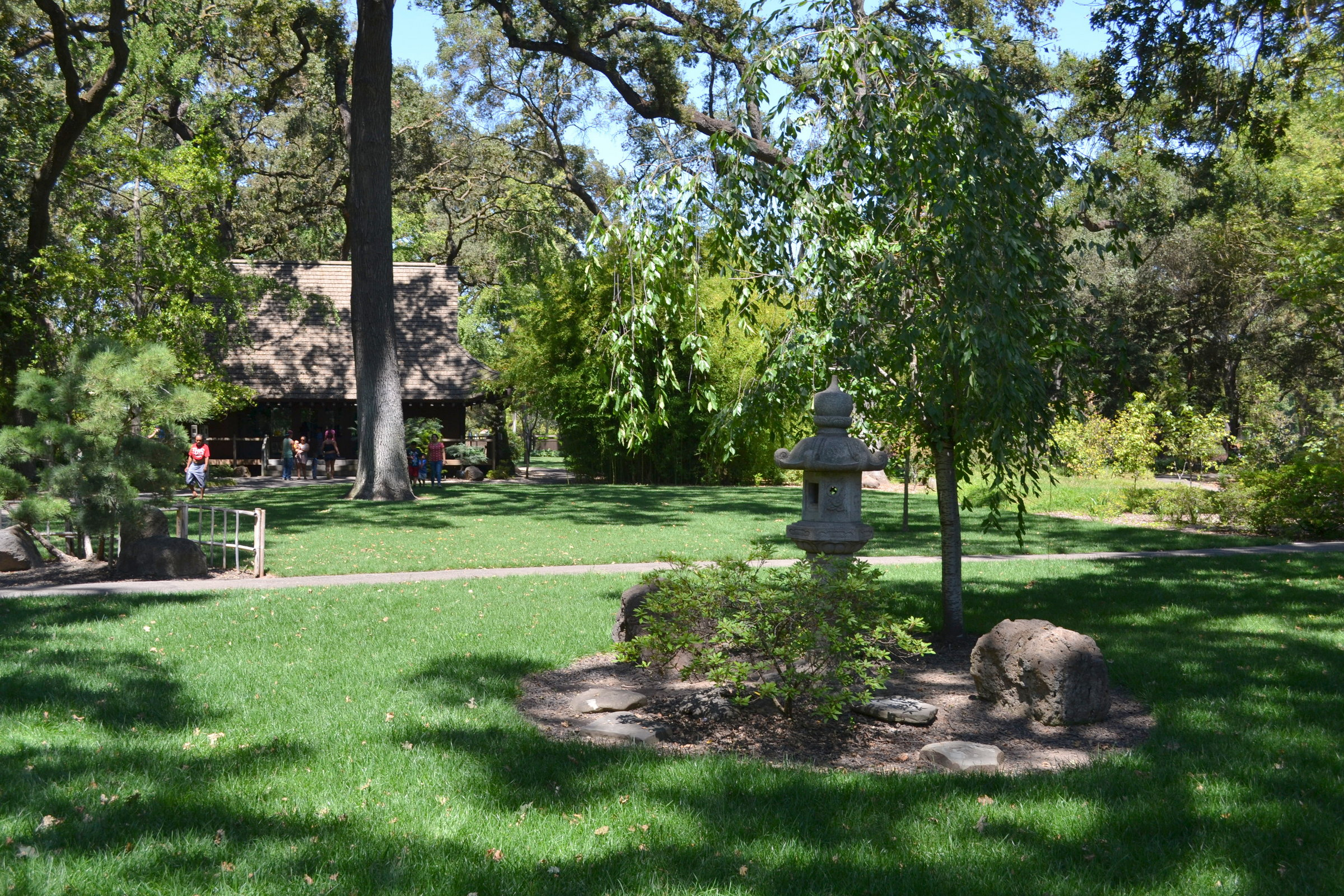
Japanese Garden

Micke Grove Zoo hosts native animals and exotic, species, some of which are endangered. The zoo participates in the Species Survival Plan and offers local educational programs.

In 1966, the San Joaquin County Historical Society and Museum was established at Micke Grove. The 40,000 square feet (3,700 m^{2}) museum contains multiple collections and exhibits, including the county archives, and operates living history programs. The construction of an 1800s historical village began in July 2025.

The Japanese-American Citizens' League developed the three-acre Japanese garden at Micke Grove. It was created in 1959 and designed by the landscape architect Nagao Sakurai. It was opened in 1965. The garden includes fish ponds with stepping stones and koi fish, and a five-story pagoda lantern donated to the park by Lodi's sister city, Kofu, Japan. The 200 koi fish were donated by the Japanese Agricultural Department.

The Lodi Garden Club contributed a rose garden in 1961. By 1964, the garden contained 227 roses. The club later added a three-tiered rock garden to the display. The Joaquin Camellia Society planted a camellia garden east of the Japanese Garden in 1965. The garden was dedicated to K. O. Hester, who donated many of the camellia plants, in 1966.

The addition of a public golf course at Micke Grove was one of the provisions in Micke's will, however initial public hearings were controversial, with zoo proponents concerned that a golf course would interfere with plans to expand the zoo. The county Board of Supervisors approved a contract for construction of the golf course in 1988, funded by the Micke Grove Trust. Micke Grove Golf Links was designed by Garrett Gill and George Williams. In 1991, the new 18-hole course hosted the 16th annual San Joaquin County Invitational Golf Tournament.

A monument to San Joaquin County veterans was added to the park in 2014, consisting of a bronze statue of a soldier, flagpole, memorial wall, and picnic area. The veterans memorial was donated by local vineyard owner John Kautz.

In 2023, $1.3 million was approved to build a miniature golf course to replace the amusement park which closed during the COVID-19 pandemic, and $3.2 million was approved for a future Pioneer Village project by the San Joaquin County Historical Society. Pioneer Village is scheduled to open on July 25, 2026.

== Funding ==
County officials estimated that Micke had donated more than $1million to the county over his lifetime. After Micke's death, the county received $1.4 million from his estate to develop and maintain the park. (Note: The amount left to the county in Micke's will is variously reported as $1.4million, almost $2million, and $2million. Relatives challenged the will, and their challenge was settled out of court for $15,000.) Over the years, the county purchased additional land surrounding the acres donated by Micke.

A 2017 investigative report found that attendance at Micke Grove Park and Zoo had increased between 2013 and 2017, but that revenue from parking fees and zoo admission had dropped by nearly 25%, which the report attributed to annual membership passes. In 2019, a civil grand jury found that San Joaquin County had relied too heavily on trust funds to support the park's budget, noting that over the previous decade, the county's budget had increased by 39% while reducing funding for parks by 16%.
