= United States v. Spearin =

- Supreme Court of the United States

Argued November 14–15, 1918 Decided December 9, 1918
- Full case name: United States v. Spearin; Spearin v. United States
- Citations: 248 U.S. 132 (more) 39 S. Ct. 59; 63 L. Ed. 166; 1918 U.S. LEXIS 1700; 42 Cont. Cas. Fed. (CCH) ¶ 77,225

Court membership
- Chief Justice Edward D. White Associate Justices Joseph McKenna · Oliver W. Holmes Jr. William R. Day · Willis Van Devanter; Mahlon Pitney · James C. McReynolds; Louis Brandeis · John H. Clarke

Case opinion
- Majority: Brandeis, joined by unanimous
- McReynolds took no part in the consideration or decision of the case.

United States v. Spearin, 248 U.S. 132 (1918), also referred to as the Spearin doctrine, is a 1918 United States Supreme Court decision. It remains one of the landmark construction law cases. The owner impliedly warrants the information, plans and specifications which an owner provides to a general contractor. The contractor will not be liable to the owner for loss or damage which results solely from insufficiencies or defects in such information, plans and specifications.

The Supreme Court wrote: "Where one agrees to do, for a fixed sum, a thing possible to be performed, he will not be excused or become entitled to additional compensation, because unforeseen difficulties are encountered. Thus one who undertakes to erect a structure upon a particular site, assumes ordinarily the risk of subsidence of the soil. But if the contractor is bound to build according to plans and specifications prepared by the owner, the contractor will not be responsible for the consequences of defects in the plans and specifications. This responsibility of the owner is not overcome by the usual clauses requiring builders to visit the site, to check the plans, and to inform themselves of the requirements of the work...the contractor should be relieved, if he was misled by erroneous statements in the specifications."

== Implied warranty ==
Related to the Spearin doctrine is the "implied warranty of adequacy", that the government is responsible to provide accurate plans and specifications to its contractors rather than the presumption of superior knowledge.

== See also ==
- Severin doctrine
- List of United States Supreme Court cases, volume 248
