= San Joaquin County Historical Society and Museum =

Regional historical museum

Coordinates: 38°4′57″N 121°16′12″W

San Joaquin County Historical Society & Museum
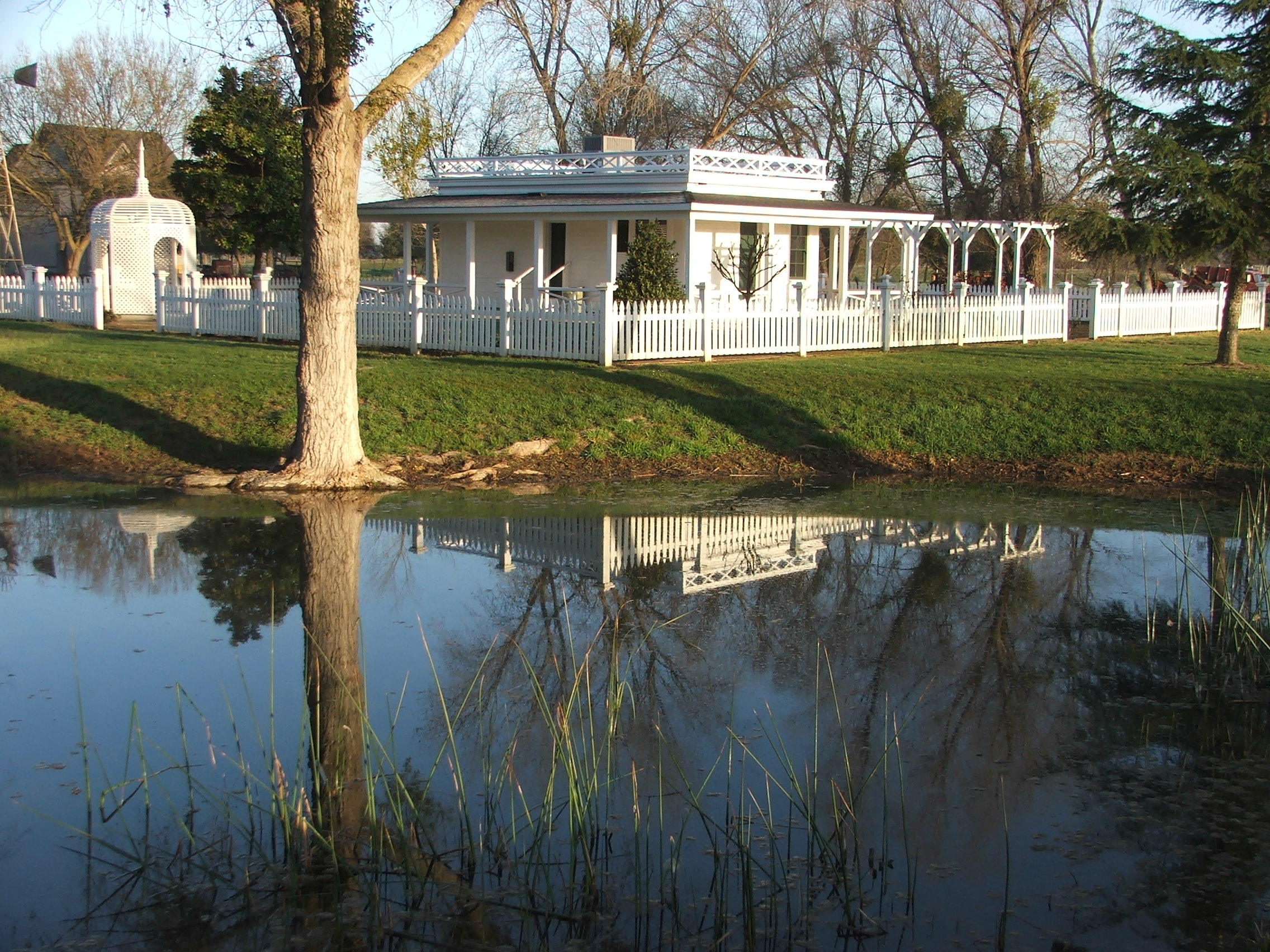
- Cottage built by Charles M. Weber, founder of Stockton, California
- Formation: 1954 (Historical Society) / 1966 (Museum)
- Type: Museum, Nonprofit
- Headquarters: 11793 N. Micke Grove Road, Lodi, CA 95240
- Region served: San Joaquin County, California
- Website: https://www.sanjoaquinhistory.org

Location within California

The San Joaquin County Historical Society and Museum is located at Micke Grove Regional Park, between Lodi, California and Stockton, California. It was established in 1966 by San Joaquin County and the San Joaquin County Historical Society.

The museum has over 40,000 square feet (3,700 m^{2}) of exhibit and work space. Their collections have grown from a few hundred items from the estate of William G. and Julia Harrison Micke to over 75,000 artifacts and over 500,000 documents and photos representative of the development of San Joaquin County. The museum was accredited by the American Alliance of Museums in 1973.

== Exhibits ==
- The Helen Weber Kennedy Gallery: a comprehensive exhibit showcasing the history of Carl David Maria Weber, founder of Stockton and his family.
- The Native American Gallery: an exhibit showcasing the economic and social cultures of local Yokuts and Miwok tribes in the San Joaquin Valley.
- The Floyd Locher Tool Collection: the largest tool collection in the United States west of the Mississippi River.
- The Sunshine Trail: an outdoor ecological history exhibit that takes visitors through the diverse ecosystems of the Sierra Nevada, foothills, and San Joaquin Valley.
- Innovations in Agriculture: showcasing San Joaquin County's contributions to global agricultural technology.
- Historic Structures: across the museum complex visitors can view the Calaveras Schoolhouse from 1884, the Charles Weber cottage, and the Victorian style of the Julia Weber House.
- Tractors and Earth Moving Equipment: the museum hosts three large exhibits dedicated to tractors, scrapers, and bulldozers invented and manufactured in San Joaquin County, including machinery from the Holt Manufacturing Company, R. G. LeTourneau, and Samson Iron Works.

== Education ==
The Museum operates a Docent Program, where adults take a one-year course in local history and education. Upon graduation, docents are expected to work as volunteer educators for various museum programs.

== Living history ==
The museum docents operate several living history programs for elementary school students throughout San Joaquin County. These programs help students learn about everyday life in the 19th and early 20th centuries, and provide context to the state history content that they learn in school.

The three primary living history programs are Valley Days, where students learn 19th century skills such as gold panning, blacksmithing, and corn grinding, Pioneer School, where students take a day of class in the Calaveras School House using the official California State Curriculum of 1884, and Farm to Fork, where students simulate the farming industry.

In 2023, $3.2 million was approved for a future Pioneer Village project by the San Joaquin County Historical Society.

== Tours and trunks ==
The museum docents give tours to visitors. The docents also operate the celebrated Grandmother's/Grandfather's Trunk program, where docents visit schools in pioneer clothing with trunks full of artifacts, which through interpretive explanation can help students learn about 19th century life.

== Archive ==
The museum also hosts the archives of San Joaquin County, with over 500,000 documents and photos available to the public for research. The archive includes:

- The Weber family collections and the personal records and business dealings of the Weber family.
- The Tillie Lewis collection, including the personal scrapbooks and papers of Tillie Lewis.
- Reclamation collections, with historical documentation on water rights, mosquito abatement, and legal reclamation in the Sacramento-San Joaquin Delta.
- Yearbooks from High Schools throughout San Joaquin County, including Stockton, Lodi, Tokay, Ripon, Tracy, Lincoln, St. Mary's, and Edison High School.
- Local genealogical records, including the First Families of San Joaquin collection, formerly the Pioneer Registry of San Joaquin County.
- The municipal records of San Joaquin County, including the official minute books of the San Joaquin County Board of Supervisors, assessment and plat books, local infrastructure records, marriage and death records, the Great Registry of Voters for San Joaquin County, and Sanborn maps for Stockton, Lodi, and Clements, California.
- Agricultural Technology Manuals.
- Chinese-language business records from the Chinese community in Stockton.
- Over 150 independent collections concerning manufacturing, logistics, and agricultural businesses in San Joaquin County.
