= Murder of Catherine Fuller =

1984 crime in Washington, D.C., United States

- Location: Washington, D.C., U.S.
- Date: October 1, 1984; 42 years ago
- Attack type: Robbery, sexual assault, murder
- Victims: Catherine Fuller, aged 49
- Accused: Timothy Catlett, Russell Overton, Levy Rouse, Kelvin Smith, Charles Turner, Chris Turner, Clifton Yarborough

The murder of Catherine Fuller was a violent sexual assault and murder which occurred in Washington, D.C. in 1984.

The case led to a heavily-reported trial in which seven co-defendants (Chris Turner, Charles Turner, Kelvin Smith, Levy Rouse, Clifton Yarborough, Timothy Catlett and Russell Overton) were tried and convicted of the crime. After allegations that the prosecution had suppressed evidence of another suspect, an appeal was heard by the United States Supreme Court in Turner v. United States. The court upheld the conviction.

== Background ==
Catherine Fuller was born in the Georgetown area of Washington D.C. in 1936 and lived with her aunt after her mother was struck by lightning. During her childhood, her older cousin took care of Catherine while her aunt worked. Catherine married David Fuller after they met at a party in 1955. They got married in 1969 and Catherine began working in the food service department of Sibley Hospital while David worked as a plumber for the General Services Administration. Catherine had three children from a previous marriage and Catherine and David later had three of their own children. After the birth of her youngest son Catherine quit her job and became a housewife in their home on K Street.

== Attack ==
On October 1, 1984, Fuller was taking a shortcut to a local liquor store called Family Liquors between 4:30 and 6:00pm. During her walk, she was sexually assaulted, beaten, and ultimately killed in a vacant garage at the back of the 800 block of H Street NE, according to the police. She was kicked, beaten, a metal pipe was inserted into her rectum, and she suffered a torn liver and punctured ribs. She was also robbed of her rings and $50. Her body was found by a street vendor in an alley full of litter, having been beaten to death with a blunt instrument. She became what The Guardian considers "the most savage and senseless killing in district history."

== Arrests ==
There were two lead detectives to the case: Patrick McGinnis and Ruben Sanchez-Serrano. Neither of the detectives worked in the neighborhood of the crime. They quickly created a theory of the crime based on an anonymous phone tip. The theory was that members of the 8th and H gang were responsible for the attack. After intense interrogation, 19 year old Calvin Alston said he saw the attack and implicated 13 other men. The detectives received two more confessions and in the summer of 1985, 17 people were in custody all from the 8th and H Street Crew. In late 1985, eight of the 17 were found guilty of the murder and sentenced to life in prison. Throughout the trial, all of the men claimed they were innocent.

=== Christopher Turner ===
One of the main men arrested for murder was Christopher Turner. He had just turned 17 and was a graduate of Coolidge High School with plans to go into the Air Force. He had claimed that he was home with his friend Kelvin Smith; however, due to the murder being weeks prior, the men could not remember what they were doing that day. He was offered a deal to plead guilty to a minor offense, testify for the government, and get a two- to six-year sentence. Turner refused, stating he would never take a deal for something he had not done.

=== Trial ===
During the trial, the government had no physical evidence to link the defendants to the crime. The prosecution's case was made through their story and the confessions of the two teenagers, whose stories were contradictory. The alibi witnesses do not remember much of that day, which had been a year prior. After five weeks and nine days of trial, the eight men were convicted of first-degree murder.

== Appeal ==
In 2012, Judge Fredrick Weisberg from Superior Court of the District of Columbia denied the motion for a new trial. The District of Columbia Court of Appeals had the same results. They later took the case to the Supreme Court of the United States. The attorneys attempted to prove that holding onto evidence was a violation of due process; they could only do so by proving that the government knowingly withheld evidence that would benefit their clients.

=== Supreme Court decision ===
The Supreme Court ruled 6 to 2 that the men convicted for the murder of Catherine Fuller should not receive a new trial in the case named Turner v. United States in 2017. They stated that the evidence is too little, weak, or distant to undermine the theory of a gang attack.

== Legacy ==
The case contributed to the view that crime had become rampant in Washington D.C and shaped the views of Washingtonians.

The case was the subject of an episode of the Netflix true crime documentary series, The Confession Tapes, which suggests that the confessions were falsified, and that the murder may have actually been committed by a convicted serial rapist and thief, James McMillan, who lived in and had been spotted in the area of the murder earlier that day.

== See also ==
- False confession
- Innocence Project

== Links ==
- "A Murder, 7 Convictions And Many Questions : NPR". npr.org.
- "D.C. MAN FOUND GUILTY OF MURDERING CAPITOL HILL WOMAN". The Washington Post.
- "Jury Hears Differing Sides Of NE Slaying". The Washington Post.
- "The Catherine Fuller case: When witnesses recant". The Washington Post.
- "Her Bills are Paid" Husband Says" The Washington Post. Retrieved 2024-04-15
- "The Murder that Won't Die" Slate. Retrieved 2024-04-15
