= Phillip Talbert =

American lawyer

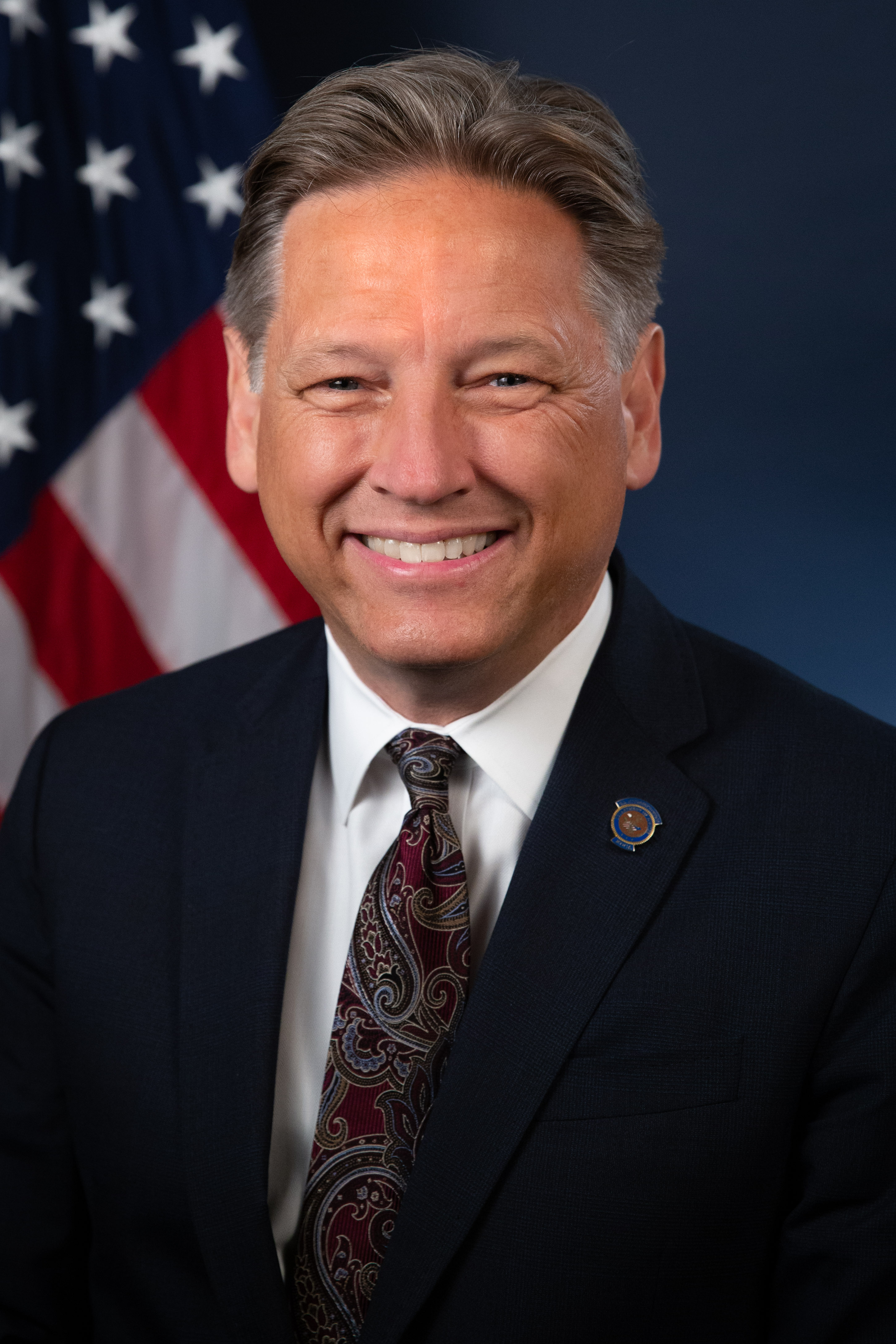

United States Attorney for the Eastern District of California
- In office July 7, 2022 – January 11, 2025; Acting: March 1, 2021 – July 7, 2022
- President: Joe Biden
- Preceded by: McGregor W. Scott
- Succeeded by: Michelle M. Beckwith (acting)
- In office 2016–2017
- President: Barack Obama

Personal details
- Born: Phillip Allen Talbert; June 27, 1962 (age 64)
- Education: Harvard University (AB); University of Sydney (MEc); University of California, Los Angeles (JD)

Phillip Allen Talbert is an American lawyer who served as the United States attorney for the Eastern District of California from 2021 to 2025.

== Education ==
Talbert earned a Bachelor of Arts from Harvard University in 1984, a Master of Economics from the University of Sydney in 1987, and a Juris Doctor from the UCLA School of Law in 1989.

== Career ==
In 1989 and 1990, Talbert served as a law clerk for Judge David R. Thompson of the United States Court of Appeals for the Ninth Circuit. From 1990 to 1993, he served as a trial attorney in the United States Department of Justice Criminal Division. From 1993 to 1996, he was an associate at the Seattle office of Stoel Rives. From 1996 to 2002, he served as counsel in the Office of Professional Responsibility. He joined the U.S. Attorney's office for Eastern California in 2002, starting in the Narcotics and Violent Crime Unit, where he prosecuted drug trafficking cases, then served as the Chief of Appeals and Training where he supervised the office's appellate practice and trained incoming Criminal Division Assistant U.S. Attorneys. Then he served as the First Assistant from 2011 through April 2016. He served as Acting United States Attorney for the Eastern District of California from 2016 to 2017, and again beginning March 1, 2021. On April 22, 2022, he was nominated to serve in the role permanently. On April 25, 2022, his nomination was sent to the Senate. On June 16, 2022, his nomination was reported out of committee by voice vote. His nomination was confirmed by the United States Senate via voice vote on June 23, 2022, and he was sworn in on July 7, 2022. He resigned from office on January 11, 2025.
