= Turner v. United States =

- Supreme Court of the United States

Argued March 29, 2017 Decided June 22, 2017
- Full case name: Turner v. United States
- Docket no.: 15-1503
- Citations: 582 U.S. 313 (more)
- Argument: Oral argument
- Opinion announcement: Opinion announcement

Case history
- Prior: Turner v. United States, 116 A.3d 894 (D.C. 2015)

Holding
- Evidence withheld by the prosecution is only Brady material if there is a reasonable probability that the result of the proceeding would have been different, considering the context of the entire record. If the evidence is too little, too weak, or too distant from the main evidentiary points, there is no violation.

Court membership
- Chief Justice John Roberts Associate Justices Anthony Kennedy · Clarence Thomas; Ruth Bader Ginsburg · Stephen Breyer; Samuel Alito · Sonia Sotomayor; Elena Kagan · Neil Gorsuch

Case opinions
- Majority: Breyer, joined by Roberts, Kennedy, Thomas, Alito, Sotomayor
- Dissent: Kagan, joined by Ginsburg
- Gorsuch took no part in the consideration or decision of the case.

Turner v. United States was a United States Supreme Court case in which the court held that evidence withheld by the prosecution is only Brady material if there is a reasonable probability that the result of the proceeding would have been different, considering the context of the entire record. If the evidence is too little, too weak, or too distant from the main evidentiary points, there is no violation.

The case considered the convictions in the 1984 case involving the sexual assault and murder of Catherine Fuller in Washington, D.C. and whether the court was misled by the prosecution because of a failure to disclose evidence. The court was questioned whether the undisclosed evidence requires the defendant's convictions to be overturned.

== Background ==
Catherine Fuller was a 49-year old mother of six living in Washington, D.C. On October 1, 1984, she suffered several internal injuries resulting from a brutal "gang assault." The conviction was largely based on eyewitness testimony and confessions some of which were later retracted or called into question. Eight people were convicted, including Christopher Turner.

Almost two decades after the trial, the defense uncovered evidence that had not been disclosed by the prosecution at the time of the trial. The evidence suggested Fuller may have been attacked by one person rather than by a large group of men. They suggested a man named James McMillan may have been responsible because he had committed a similar assault in the same neighborhood on the same day Fuller was murdered. Further evidence raised serious questions about the credibility of the prosecution's key witness in regards to their potential motives.

== Supreme Court decision ==
The Supreme Court held that the withheld evidence was not relevant enough to have made a difference. In a 6–2 decision, the court upheld the convictions. They argued that the withheld evidence, though it lacked physical evidence, was material to their defense and was not material under Brady v. Maryland because there was no "reasonable probability" that the verdict would've been any different.

The dissenting justice disagreed and argued that if the evidence was shown, it would have allowed the defense to present an alternative narrative that could have persuaded at least one of the jurors.
