= Tillie Lewis =

American captain of industry

Tillie Ehrlich-Weisberg Lewis
- Born: Myrtle Ehrlich; July 13, 1901
- Died: April 30, 1977 (aged 75)
- Organization: Flotill Foods Corporation
- Known for: food packing

Tillie Ehrlich-Weisberg Lewis (born Myrtle Ehrlich; July 13, 1901 – April 30, 1977), was a highly successful entrepreneur and leader in the mid 20th century food packing industry. She was an early promoter of the Italian San Marzano tomato to the Stockton, California area and established tomato and multiple agricultural products canning in both the San Joaquin and Stanislaus Counties. Her company became the fifth largest canning business in the United States by 1950. She changed hiring practices during the 1930s Great Depression by inviting people of all races, gender, and faith into her workforce. Tillie brought the first diet and diet products approved by the American Medical Association into grocery stores and high-end hotel menus, the Tasti-Diet.

== Biography ==
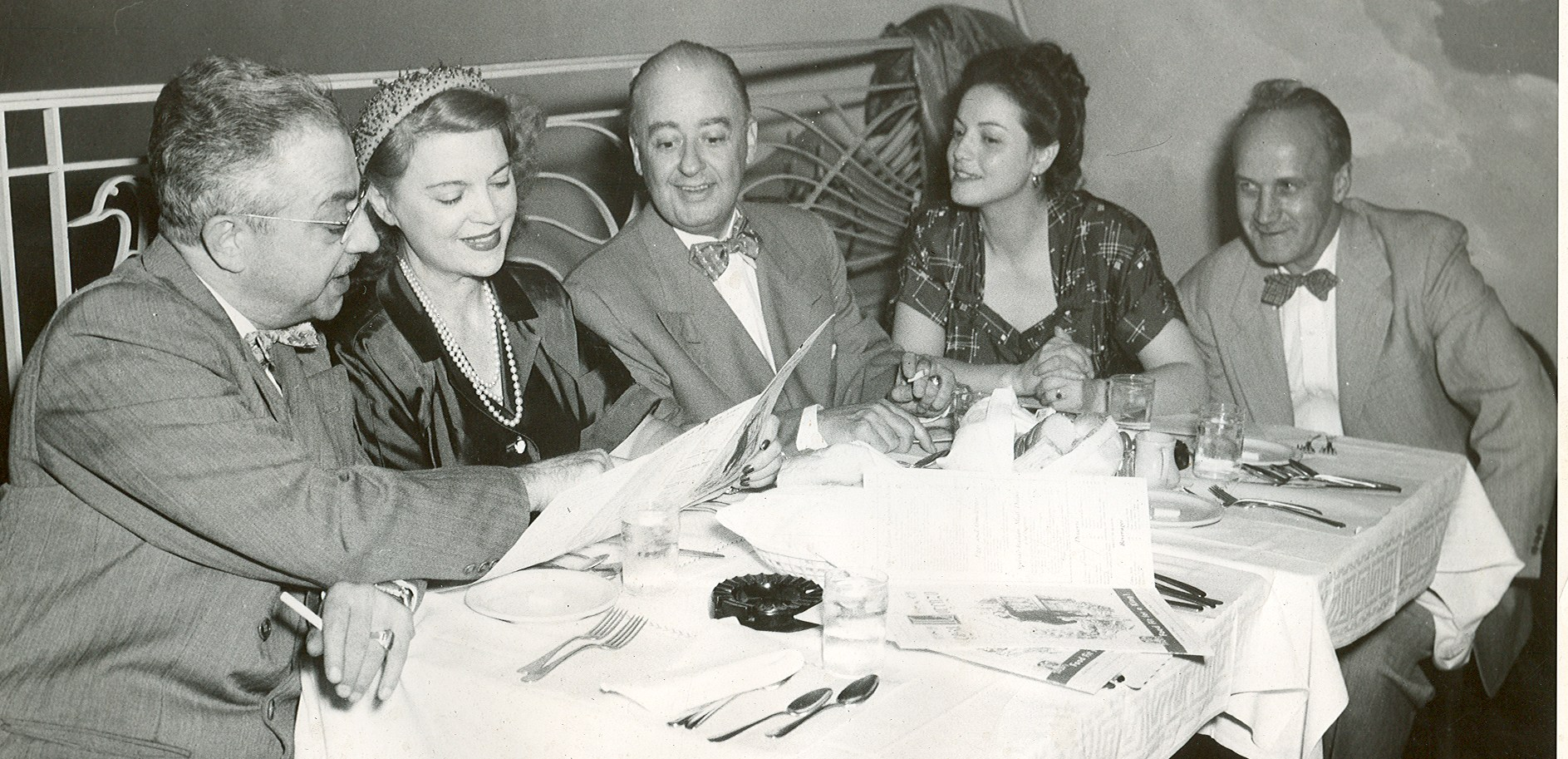
Lewis (second from left), mid-1950s

Born to Austrian Jewish immigrants, Tillie grew up in Brooklyn, New York and stated she worked in the garment district at the age of 14.

Tillie stated she married Louis Weisberg in 1916. Weisberg was a partner in Mosalina Products/Hochheiser & Weisberg, a wholesale grocery business that imported pomodoro tomatoes from Italy along with many other delicacies. After her marriage ended, Tillie travelled to Italy where she worked in a tomato cannery in Naples. The federal government had recently raised the tariff on imported tomato products by 50% and Florindo del Gaizo, the part-owner of the cannery, who was worried about losing his American customers, became her primary investor, providing her with tomato seeds, some canning equipment, and money. Returning to the U.S., Tillie settled on Stockton, California to grow the tomatoes. After persuading farmers in the area to experiment raising the tomatoes, she convinced Pacific Can Company to build a plant at Stockton with an option for her to buy it. By 1940, she had made San Joaquin County the top tomato-producing county in the United States.

Tillie and del Gaizo formed the Flotill Foods Corporation. When del Gaszio died in 1937, Tillie borrowed money and became the sole owner of Flotill Foods. Over the next decade, she began canning spinach and asparagus and built more canning plants. Flotill also canned fruits, baby food and juices. During World War II, Flotill was the largest supplier of Army C-Rations in the nation. In consideration of their experience as a World War II producer, Flotill was selected again during the Korean War and became one of the largest ration assemblers for the military.

When the agricultural industry faced labor shortages due to World War II, Tilly sponsored workers from Mexico through the bracero program to assist Stockton farmers.

Tillie met Meyer Lewis, an American Federation of Labor organizer, in 1940 when he helped her negotiate a contract with her employees. In 1941, Tillie signed what she called "the first full union contract in the history of agricultural labor in the United States", keeping her company strike free while other companies dealt with labor struggles. Tillie married Lewis seven years later.

In 1952, Tillie launched Tasti-Diet Foods, a line of artificially sweetened foods. By 1953, a dietetic menu based entirely on Tasti-Diet products was available at the Vanderbilt Hotel in New York City. Since the beginning of Flotill, Tillie was a prominent figure in the company's marketing as a manager who could relate to the concerns of female consumers. With the launch of Tasti-Diet Foods, Tillie became the center of the advertising campaigns, constructing a story of a woman who had struggled with weight and developed a solution for a problem she shared with other women. An idealized version of Tillie's success was told in articles in Time, Parade: The Sunday Picture Magazine, Everywoman's Woman, and Reader's Digest.

In 1951, Tillie named "businesswoman of the year" by the Associated Press. She changed the name of her company to Tillie Lewis Foods and began selling shares on the American Stock Exchange in 1961. Tillie Lewis Foods merged with Ogden Foods (now part of Pet, Inc.) of New York City in 1966, and Tillie was elected the first woman director of Ogden Foods. By 1971, Tillie Lewis Foods had sales of over $90 million per year.

Tillie Lewis Foods was the lead defendant in what became an industrywide employment discrimination case, Alaniz v. Tillie Lewis Foods et al. (later renamed Alaniz v. California Processors, Inc. (CPI)). The case was based on employment practices in which fulltime employees (typically native-born, white, and male) and seasonal employees (mostly immigrant and female) had different and disparate employment benefits and salaries. Although conditions at Tillie Lewis Foods were standard for the time and the industry, the lawsuit was an unwelcome challenge to her reputation.

Her husband, Meyer Lewis, died in 1976. Tillie Lewis died in 1977 after suffering a cerebral hemorrhage.

A theater at San Joaquin Delta College is named for Tillie Lewis, as is Tillie Lewis Drive in Stockton. In 2020, she was one of eight women featured in "The Only One in the Room" display at the Smithsonian National Museum of American History.
