= Lodi, California =

City in California, United States

- City
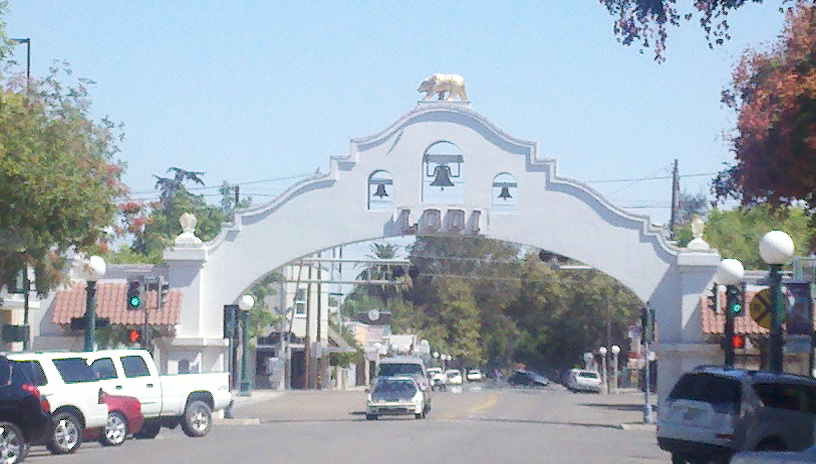
- Lodi Arch

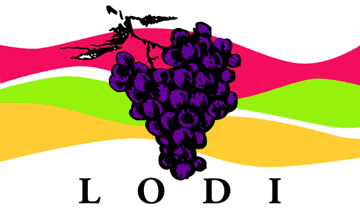
- Flag
- Motto(s): "Livable, Lovable, Lodi"
- Interactive map of Lodi, California
- Location in the United States
- Coordinates: 38°7′44″N 121°16′51″W
- Country: United States
- State: California
- County: San Joaquin
- Incorporated: December 6, 1906

Government
  - Type: Council-Mayor
  - Mayor: Ramon Yepez
  - State Senate: Jerry McNerney (D)
  - Assembly: Heath Flora (R)
  - U. S. Congress: Josh Harder (D)

Area
  - Total: 13.86 sq mi (35.91 km^{2})
  - Land: 13.64 sq mi (35.33 km^{2})
  - Water: 0.22 sq mi (0.58 km^{2}) 1.62%
- Elevation: 49 ft (15 m)

Population (2020)
  - Total: 66,348
  - Estimate (2025): 69,100
  - Density: 4,900/sq mi (1,880/km^{2})
- Time zone: UTC−8 (PST)
  - Summer (DST): UTC−7 (PDT)
- ZIP Codes: 95240–95242
- Area code: 209, 350
- FIPS code: 06-42202
- GNIS feature IDs: 277608, 2410854
- Website: www.lodi.gov

Lodi (/ˈloʊdaɪ/ LOH-dye) is a city in San Joaquin County, California, United States, in the center portion of California's Central Valley. The population was 66,348 at the 2020 census.

== History ==
When a group of local families decided to establish a school in 1859, they settled on a site near present-day Cherokee Lane and Turner Road. In 1869, the Central Pacific Railroad was in the process of creating a new route, and settlers Ezekiel Lawrence, Reuben Wardrobe, A. C. Ayers, and John Magley offered a townsite of 160 acres (0.65 km^{2}) to the railroad as an incentive to build a station there. The railroad received a "railroad reserve" of 12 acres (49,000 m^{2}) in the middle of town, and surveyors began laying out streets in the area between Washington to Church and Locust to Walnut. Settlers flocked from nearby Woodbridge, Liberty City, and Galt including town founders John M. Burt and Dan Crist.

Initially called Mokelumne and Mokelumne Station after the nearby Mokelumne River, confusion with other nearby towns prompted a name change, which was officially endorsed in Sacramento by an assembly bill. Several stories have been offered about the origins of the town's name change. One refers to a locally stabled trotting horse that had set a four-mile (6 km) record, but as the horse reached the peak of its fame in 1869, it is unlikely that its notoriety would still have been evident in 1873. Alternatively, Lodi is a city in northern Italy where Napoleon defeated the Austrians in 1796 and won his first military victory. More than likely, some of the earliest settler families were from one of the places that was once called Lodi, Illinois, and chose to use the same name as their hometown.

In 1906, the city was officially incorporated by voters, passing by a margin of 2 to 1. The fire department was established in 1911, and the city purchased the Bay City Gas and Water Works in 1919. Additional public buildings constructed during this period include the Lodi Opera House in 1905, a Carnegie library in 1909, and a hospital in 1915.

== Demographics ==
Historical population
Census	Pop.	Note	%±
1880	606		—
1890	1,013		67.2%
1910	2,697		—
1920	4,850		79.8%
1930	6,788		40.0%
1940	11,079		63.2%
1950	13,798		24.5%
1960	22,229		61.1%
1970	28,691		29.1%
1980	35,221		22.8%
1990	51,874		47.3%
2000	56,999		9.9%
2010	62,134		9.0%
2020	66,348		6.8%
2025 (est.)	69,100	▲	4.1%
U.S. Decennial Census

=== 2020 census ===
As of the 2020 census, Lodi had a population of 66,348. The median age was 36.6 years. 25.0% of residents were under the age of 18 and 17.1% of residents were 65 years of age or older. For every 100 females there were 94.6 males, and for every 100 females age 18 and over there were 91.1 males age 18 and over.

99.8% of residents lived in urban areas, while 0.2% lived in rural areas.

There were 23,816 households in Lodi, of which 35.1% had children under the age of 18 living in them. Of all households, 47.5% were married-couple households, 17.3% were households with a male householder and no spouse or partner present, and 28.0% were households with a female householder and no spouse or partner present. About 25.1% of all households were made up of individuals and 12.8% had someone living alone who was 65 years of age or older.

There were 24,766 housing units, of which 3.8% were vacant. The homeowner vacancy rate was 1.1% and the rental vacancy rate was 3.7%.

Racial composition as of the 2020 census
Race	Number	Percentage
White	34,387	51.8%
Black or African American	872	1.3%
American Indian and Alaska Native	827	1.2%
Asian	6,354	9.6%
Native Hawaiian and Other Pacific Islander	146	0.2%
Some other race	14,690	22.1%
Two or more races	9,072	13.7%
Hispanic or Latino (of any race)	25,949	39.1%

=== 2010 census ===
As of the 2010 census, Lodi had a population of 62,134. The population density was 4,494.5 inhabitants per square mile (1,735.3/km^{2}). The racial makeup of Lodi was 62.1% White, 1.8% African American, 0.5% Native American, 9.7% Asian, 0.4% Pacific Islander, and 17.2% from two or more races. Hispanic or Latino of any race were 22,613 persons 37.8%.

There were 22,097 households, out of which 8,462 (38.3%) had children under the age of 18 living in them, 10,952 (49.6%) were opposite-sex married couples living together, 2,917 (13.2%) had a female householder with no husband present, 1,389 (6.3%) had a male householder with no wife present. There were 1,530 (6.9%) unmarried opposite-sex partnerships, and 105 (0.5%) same-sex married couples or partnerships. 5,547 households (25.1%) were made up of individuals, and 2,567 (11.6%) had someone living alone who was 65 years of age or older. The average household size was 2.78. There were 15,258 families (69.1% of all households); the average family size was 3.35.

The population was spread out, with 17,282 people (27.8%) under the age of 18, 5,863 people (9.4%) aged 18 to 24, 15,931 people (25.6%) aged 25 to 44, 14,681 people (23.6%) aged 45 to 64, and 8,377 people (13.5%) who were 65 years of age or older. The median age was 34.3 years. For every 100 females, there were 95.5 males. For every 100 females age 18 and over, there were 92.1 males.

There were 23,792 housing units at an average density of 1,721.0 units per square mile (664.5 units/km^{2}), of which 12,091 (54.7%) were owner-occupied, and 10,006 (45.3%) were occupied by renters. The homeowner vacancy rate was 2.3%; the rental vacancy rate was 8.2%. 32,153 people (51.7% of the population) lived in owner-occupied housing units and 29,304 people (47.2%) lived in rental housing units. The Census reported that 61,457 people (98.9% of the population) lived in households, 187 (0.3%) lived in non-institutionalized group quarters, and 490 (0.8%) were institutionalized.

There were approximately 4,336 adults who hadn't passed ninth grade, 5,175 with some high school education, 8,910 who had completed a high school education only, 8,367 with some college, 2,777 with an associate degree; People with a bachelor's degree numbered 3,797; those with a graduate degree, 1,685. Seventy-nine percent of the population had a high school diploma or higher.

== Geography ==
Lodi is flat terrain at an elevation of approximately 50 feet (15 m) above mean sea level datum. Historically, land in the area has been used for grazing as well as for grain production.

There has long been a movement in the area to preserve a "greenbelt" as a buffer zone between Lodi and Stockton in order to keep the two cities separate.

According to the United States Census Bureau, the city covers an area of 13.9 square miles (36 km^{2}), 98.38% of it land, and 1.62% of it water.

=== Climate ===
Lodi has cool, wet winters, often characterized by dense ground fog, and hot, dry summers with a considerably higher degree of diurnal temperature variation than in winter. According to the Köppen climate classification system, Lodi has a hot-summer Mediterranean climate (Köppen Csa). Due to the city's proximity to the Sacramento-San Joaquin Delta, summer temperatures usually dip into the fifties at night. Fog and low overcast sometimes drifts in from San Francisco Bay during the summer and it can be breezy at times, especially at night.

Average January temperatures are a maximum of 55 °F (13 °C) and a minimum of 37 °F (3 °C). Average July temperatures are a maximum of 91 °F (33 °C) and a minimum of 57 °F (14 °C). There are an average of 65.3 days with highs of 90 °F (32 °C) or higher and an average of 30.5 days with lows of 32 °F (0 °C) or lower. The record high temperature was 111 °F (44 °C) on June 15, 1961. The record low temperature was 11 °F (−12 °C) on January 11, 1949.

Annual precipitation averages 18 in (46 cm), falling on an average of 59 days. The wettest year was 1983 with 35.4 in (90 cm) and the driest year was 1976 with 7.18 in (18.2 cm). The most rainfall in one month was 15.01 in (38.1 cm) in January 1911. The most rainfall in 24 hours was 3.76 in (9.6 cm) on December 11, 1906. Snow is very rare in Lodi, but 1.5 in (3.8 cm) fell on January 12, 1930. January is the wettest month.

Climate data for Lodi, California (averages 1980–2010, records 1893–present)
Month	Jan	Feb	Mar	Apr	May	Jun	Jul	Aug	Sep	Oct	Nov	Dec	Year
Record high °F (°C)	72 (22)	82 (28)	87 (31)	96 (36)	104 (40)	111 (44)	110 (43)	109 (43)	108 (42)	101 (38)	87 (31)	76 (24)	111 (44)
Mean maximum °F (°C)	65 (18)	71 (22)	78 (26)	89 (32)	94 (34)	100 (38)	102 (39)	101 (38)	98 (37)	91 (33)	76 (24)	66 (19)	104 (40)
Mean daily maximum °F (°C)	55.2 (12.9)	62.2 (16.8)	67.9 (19.9)	74.1 (23.4)	81.4 (27.4)	87.6 (30.9)	91.8 (33.2)	90.8 (32.7)	87.7 (30.9)	78.4 (25.8)	64.5 (18.1)	55.3 (12.9)	74.8 (23.8)
Mean daily minimum °F (°C)	38.5 (3.6)	40.8 (4.9)	43.4 (6.3)	46.0 (7.8)	51.1 (10.6)	55.3 (12.9)	57.6 (14.2)	56.8 (13.8)	54.6 (12.6)	49.0 (9.4)	42.2 (5.7)	37.7 (3.2)	47.8 (8.8)
Mean minimum °F (°C)	28 (−2)	29 (−2)	33 (1)	37 (3)	41 (5)	47 (8)	50 (10)	49 (9)	46 (8)	39 (4)	30 (−1)	26 (−3)	25 (−4)
Record low °F (°C)	11 (−12)	18 (−8)	22 (−6)	28 (−2)	32 (0)	37 (3)	40 (4)	40 (4)	34 (1)	29 (−2)	22 (−6)	13 (−11)	11 (−12)
Average rainfall inches (mm)	3.48 (88)	3.31 (84)	2.87 (73)	1.36 (35)	0.67 (17)	0.14 (3.6)	0.00 (0.00)	0.03 (0.76)	0.31 (7.9)	1.15 (29)	2.36 (60)	3.34 (85)	19.02 (483)
Average rainy days	10	9	9	6	3	1	0	0	1	3	7	9	59
Source: Western Regional Climate Center

== Economy ==
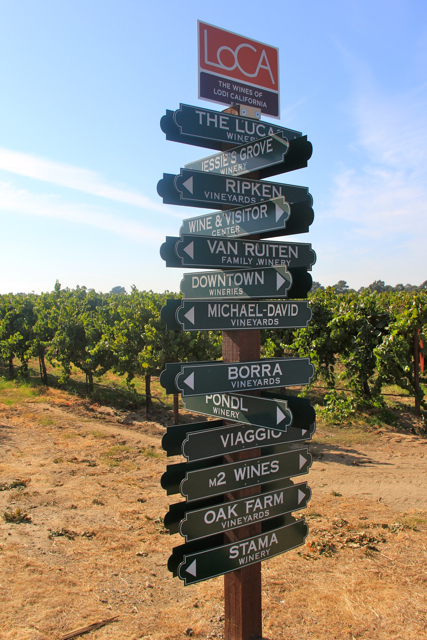
Signs point the way to various vineyards in Lodi, California

Early industries in Lodi included a sawmill, flour mill, vineyards, orchards, and cattle ranching.

The Lodi Land and Lumber Company sawmill was built on the south bank of the Mokelumne River in 1877, and relied on logs floated down from the Sierra during the rainy season. The mill was powered by a steam engine and had a capacity of 40,000 board feet (94 m^{3}) per day.

The early 20th century saw the establishment of several large manufacturers and general service providers with national distribution capabilities, such as Supermold, the Pinkerton Foundry, Lodi Truck Service, the Lodi Iron Works, Pacific Coast Producers, Holz Rubber Company, Valley Industries, General Mills, and Goehring Meat Company. Lodi is the birthplace of A&W Root Beer and A&W Restaurants, established in 1919, which subsequently became one of the first franchised fast food restaurants.

According to the city's 2021 comprehensive annual financial report, the top employers in the city were:

Rank	Employer	No. of Employees
1	Lodi Unified School District	1,389
2	Pacific Coast Producers	1,298
3	Adventist Health Lodi Memorial	1,204
4	Blue Shield of California	1,042
5	Walmart	439
6	City of Lodi	415
7	Rich Products	276
8	Costco	265
9	Frank C. Alegre Trucking	210
10	Farmers & Merchants Bank of Central California	191

== Arts and culture ==
=== A&W Root Beer ===
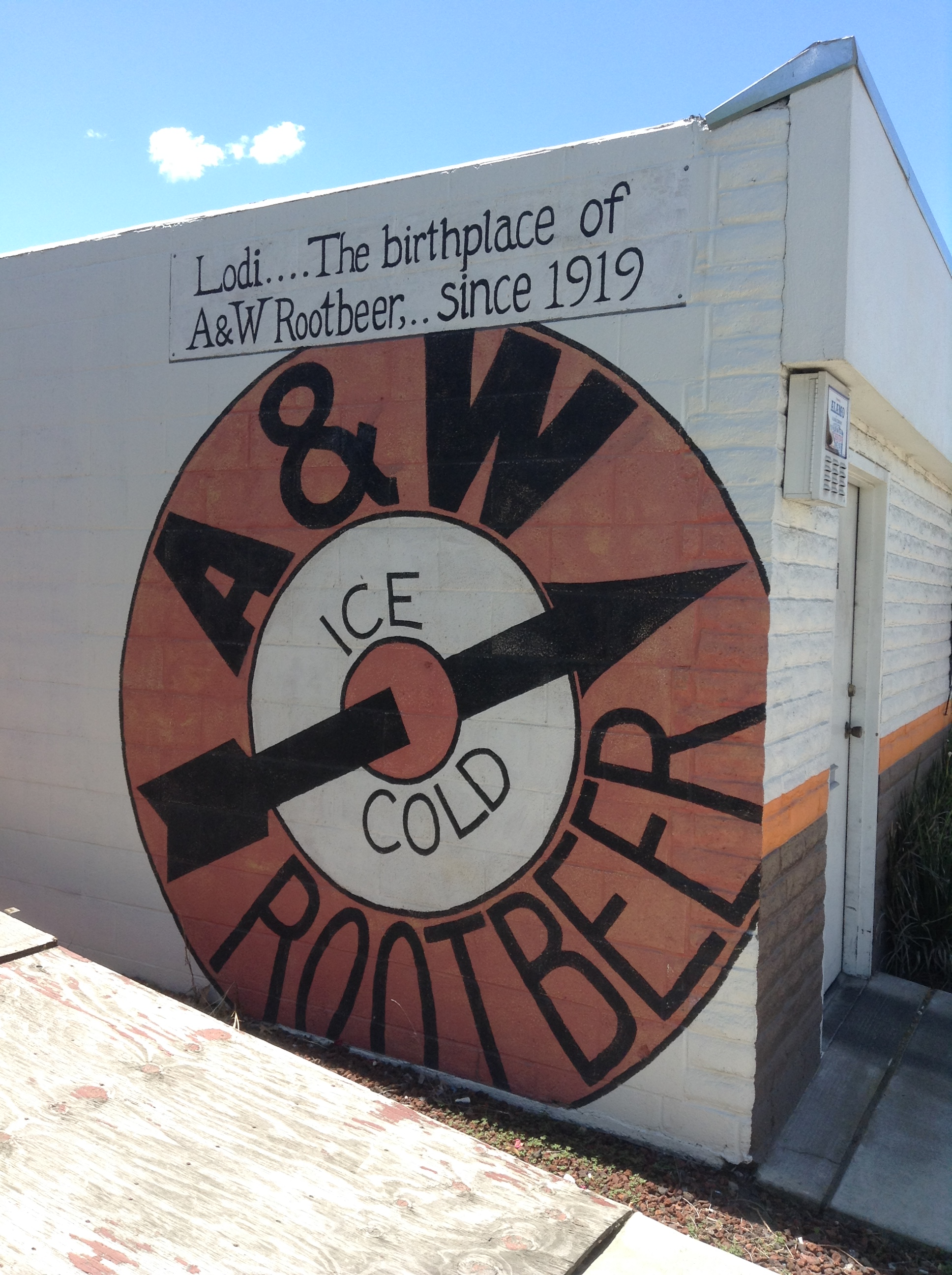
Lodi the birthplace of A&W Root Beer since 1919

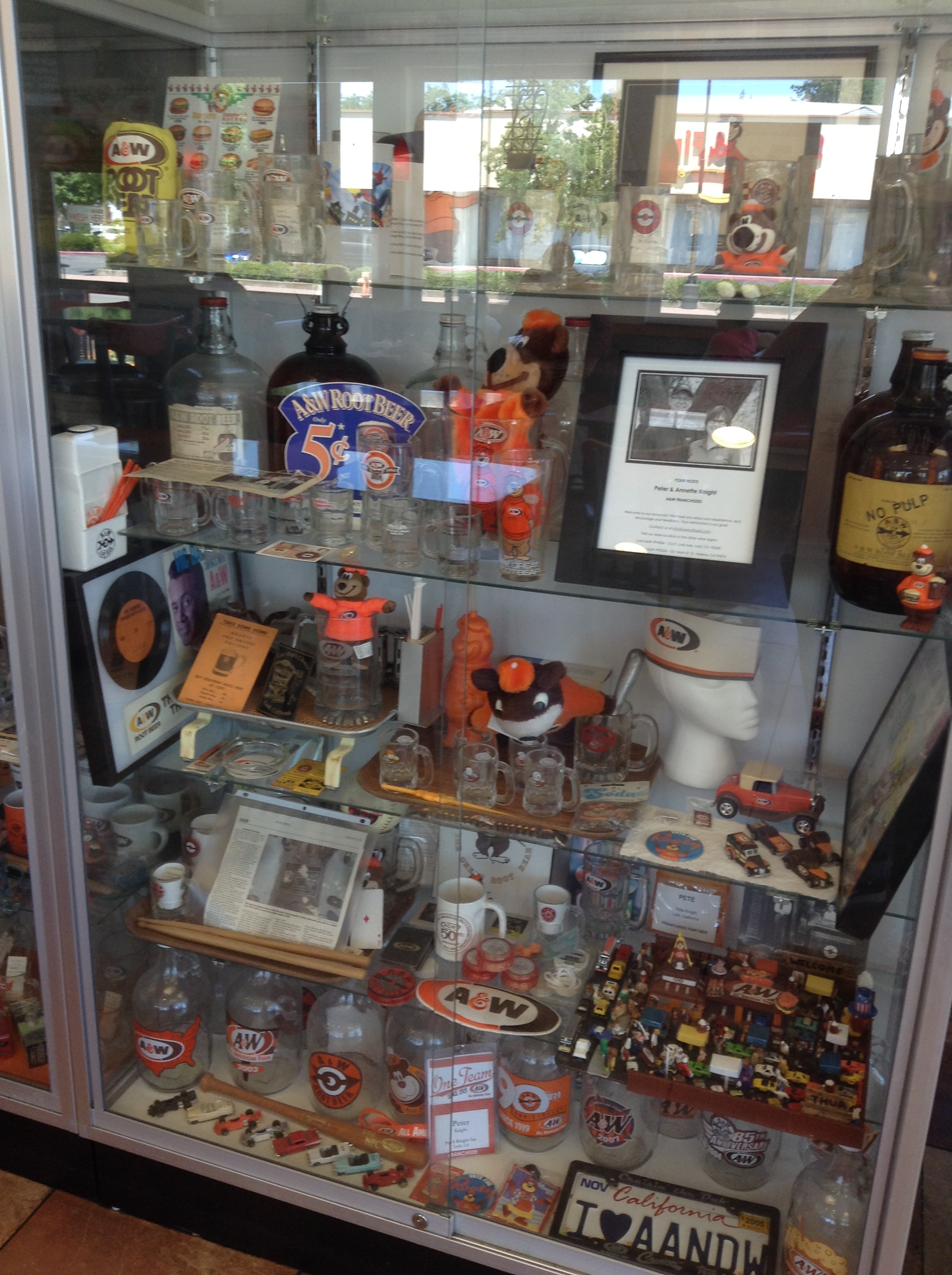
Collectables at the A&W restaurant in Lodi, California

Lodi is the birthplace of A&W Root Beer, the first batch of which was made in 1919 on a hot dog cart during a parade. The spot where Roy W. Allen sold his root beer is now marked with a plaque. It is now sold in cans and bottles throughout the US, as well as in a chain of American restaurants. Lodi's A&W restaurant features a vast collection of A&W novelties.

=== Farmers market ===
The Farmers Market is held every Thursday evening from May 18 through September 1 (as of 2016) on School Street in Downtown Lodi. It is hosted and run by the Lodi Chamber of Commerce. It offers a large collection of fresh produce as well as baked goods, crafts, food vendors, and live entertainment.

=== Grapes and wine ===
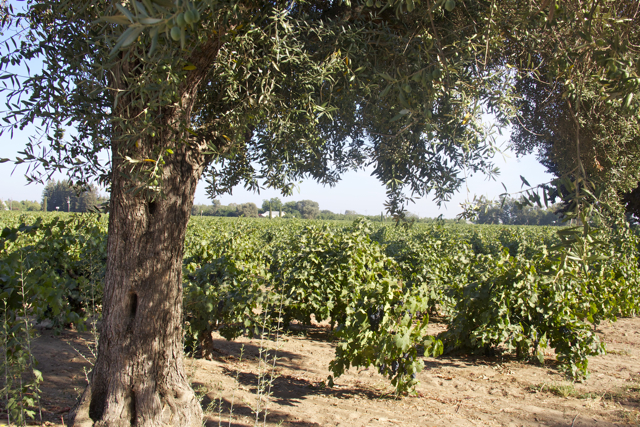
Vineyard in Lodi, California.

Lodi and its surroundings are well known for the cultivation of grapes and production of wine. There are many vineyards in Lodi with century-old grapevines, some going into California wines like Bedrock and Turley. Starting in the early 20th century, and right up to the early 1980s, Lodi promoted itself as the "Tokay Capital of the World" due to the abundance of the Flame Tokay variety in the area. Nowadays there are over 100 different grape varieties planted in the Lodi AVA in over 113,000 acres (46,000 ha) of vineyards. The town is surrounded by grapevines and the police cars have grape bunches painted on the sides of them. Winegrape culture pervades the town, with many business, street, and school names relating to the industry.

The "Flame Tokay" grape was introduced from Algeria in 1857 and was a central feature of the vineyards that gradually rose to prominence because of the sandy loam soil and the location directly east of the Suisun Pass. Local Marvin Nies used old flame tokay vines located on property farmed by Malcolm Lea to create, in conjunction with U.C. Davis plant breeding specialists, the seedless Tokay. Malcolm Lea, a co-founder of Guild Winery and East-Side Winery, sold substantial quantities of crushed grapes to Inglenook and other older Napa wineries, as well as truckloads of crushed grapes to San Francisco restaurants that made their own "house" wines. For a brief period during the late 19th century, the vines were usurped in favor of watermelons and wheat, but price cuts and labeling problems encouraged farmers to plant more vines.

In 1991, Lodi winegrape growers decided to self-impose a tax on their grapes to fund the Lodi Winegrape Commission. In 1992, the commission launched an integrated pest management program, known as Lodi Rules. In 2014, the commission was awarded a Governor's Environmental and Economic Leadership Award for the Lodi Rules program. In 2015, Lodi was named Wine Region of the Year by Wine Enthusiast magazine. The Wine Bloggers Conference of 2016 brought over 300 wine bloggers to the area, where attendees filled the Internet with compliments about the small-town hospitality of Lodi's approachable, authentic winegrowing community.

Every September the Lodi Grape Festival is held and includes rides, food, and wine tasting. The Wine & Food Festival (formerly known as the Spring Wine Show, held in late March/early April, so as not to coincide with Easter every year) also showcases the area's 50-plus wineries. Beginning in 2016 there will also be a Beer Fest showcasing IPA and other types of beer along with food and music.

Conceived in 2005 by the Lodi Winegrape Commission, the Zinfest wine event is held at Lodi Lake and features Zinfandel wines. Usually held on the third weekend of May, this event includes a Friday-night dinner called "Vintner's Grille". As of 2020, Zinfest was renamed to RowXRow, but the 2020 festival was canceled due to the COVID-19 pandemic.

=== Museums ===
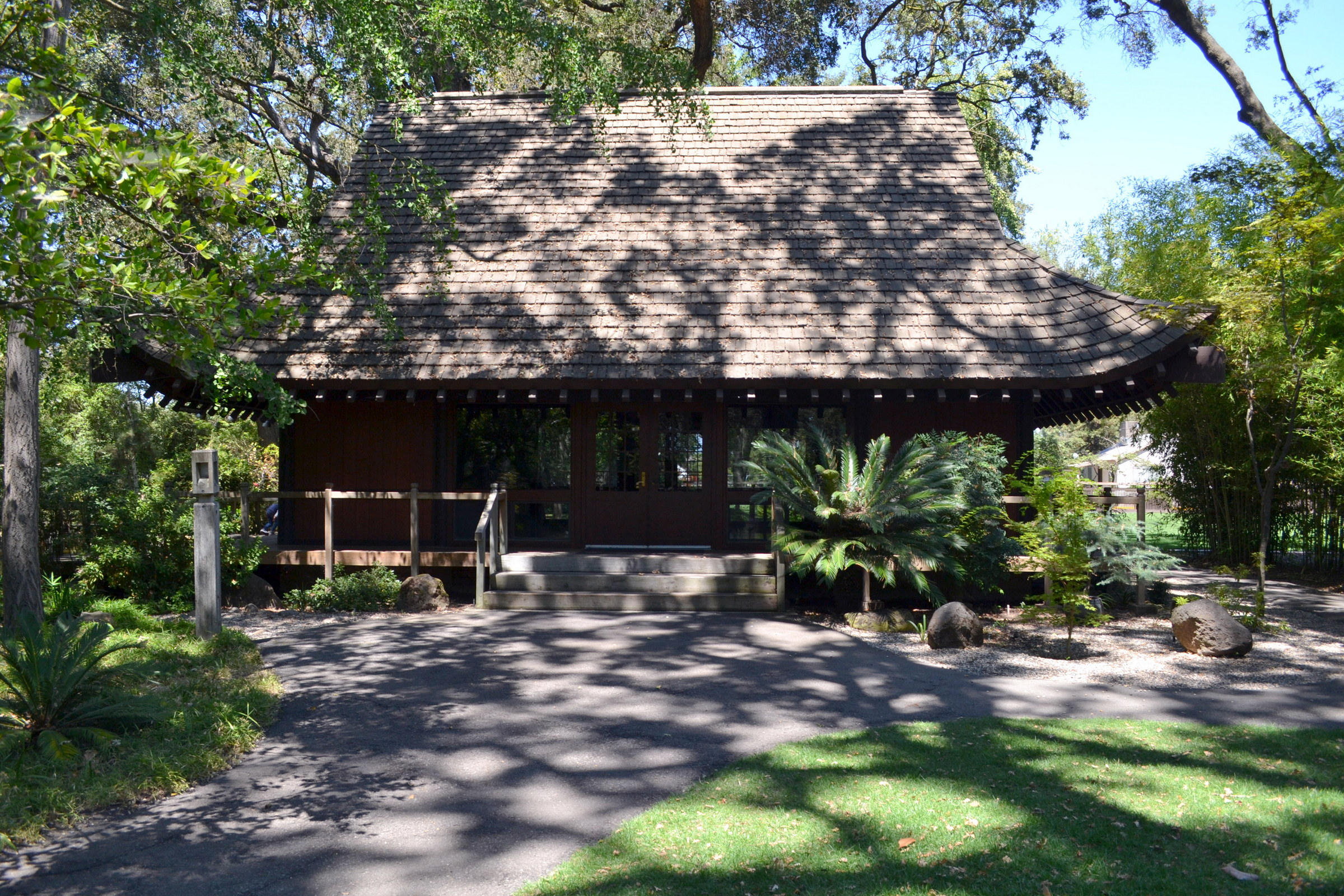
Japanese Garden in Micke Grove Regional Park

The Hill House Museum, a restored Queen Anne Victorian built around 1901 for an early, skilled jeweler/watchmaking Lodian, George Hill, contains historical exhibits relating to the history of the town, including the house's original furniture.

The San Joaquin County Historical Society and Museum, the largest museum complex in the county, is just south of Lodi, at the Micke Grove Regional Park, and traces the history of the area through many exhibits and interactive displays.

World of Wonders, a downtown science museum, features interactive science exhibits, classrooms, and a retail store. The museum first opened on January 4, 2009.

=== Theater ===
Changing Faces Theater Company is a non-profit, student-run organization that is supported by the Lodi Arts Commission. An annual two-week production occurs each summer and is cast with mostly local children ranging from age six up to college students and, sometimes, a few adults. The production is normally staged at Jessie's Grove Winery, where a number of additional activities are typically held at the same time.

Lodi Musical Theater Company is also prominent in the Lodi theater community, staging shows at Hutchins Street Square such as West Side Story and Joseph and the Amazing Technicolor Dreamcoat.

From the 1970s to the late 1990s, Lodi was also home to the "Tokay Players," a group of local actors, directors, set builders etc. who had no professional experience, but put on dozens of productions over the period.

== Transportation ==
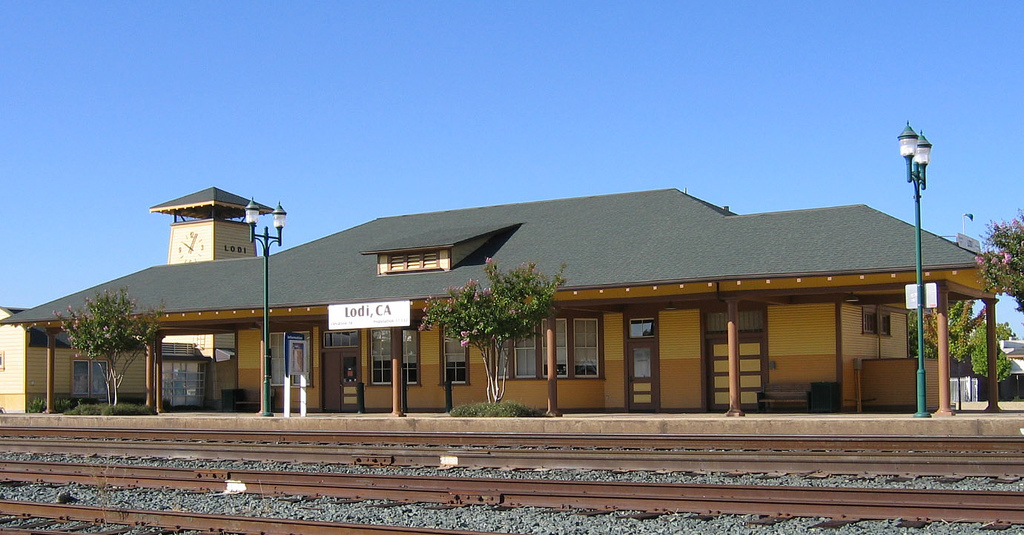
Lodi Amtrak station

The City of Lodi operates the Lodi GrapeLine local bus service.

Lodi Transit Station is served by Amtrak Gold Runner train service on the Sacramento line. It became a regular stop in 2002. The station is also served by Greyhound Lines, San Joaquin Regional Transit District, and South County Transit. The Amtrak Thruway 3 bus line provides additional daily connections from the Lodi Transit Station to/from Sacramento and Stockton.

== Media ==
- Lodi Monthly Magazine
- Lodi News-Sentinel

== Emergency services ==
Law enforcement services in Lodi are provided by the Lodi Police Department. Fire department services are provided by the Lodi Fire Department. Emergency medical services are provided by American Medical Response, who have been operating in both Lodi and Stockton since 1992.

== In popular culture ==
A Creedence Clearwater Revival song, "Lodi", was named for Lodi, California, although the songwriter John Fogerty admits he had never actually visited the city and simply thought it was "the coolest sounding name".

The opening scene from the film, Cool Hand Luke, in which Paul Newman was cutting parking meters, was shot in Lodi.

Lodi was featured by Huell Howser in Road Trip Episode 144.

Lodi is also often mentioned in the FX show, Sons of Anarchy. The show takes place in the fictional town of "Charming", which is said to neighbor Lodi.

== Sister cities ==
Lodi has two sister cities, as designated by Sister Cities International:

- Kofu, Japan (April 11, 1961)
- Lodi, Italy

== Notable people ==
- A Skylit Drive, post-hardcore band
- Jason Bartlett, Major League Baseball player
- Greg Bishop, former National Football League player
- Olympe Bradna, French actress and dancer, lived and died in Lodi
- Sara Carter of the Carter Family retired to Lodi with her second husband, Coy Bayes.
- Bill Cartwright, former National Basketball Association player
- William Chaney, educator
- David Cooper, Major League Baseball player
- Duke "The Dumpster" Droese, former WWF professional wrestler
- Nathan Diaz, UFC mixed martial artist
- Nick Diaz, UFC mixed martial artist
- Sione Fua, NFL player
- Hamid Hayat, agricultural worker tried and convicted for, and then exonerated of terrorism-related activity
- Brandi Hitt, journalist
- Alyson Huber, former Member of the State Assembly
- Patrick Ianni, Major League Soccer player
- Tayt Ianni, former Major League Soccer player
- Bridget Marquardt, model and television personality
- Reagan Maui'a, National Football League player
- Justin Medeiros, professional CrossFit athlete
- Robert Mondavi, vintner and winery owner
- Bill Munson, former National Football League player
- Barbara Oakley, expert in the field of learning practices
- Brad Wellman, former infielder for the San Francisco Giants
- Destiny Rogers, R&B singer
- Bob Sternfels, managing director of McKinsey & Company
- Jae Suh Park, actress

== See also ==
- California wine
