= Michael E. Levi =

American experimental physicist

- Born: Chicago, Illinois
- Education: Harvard College (BA, 1977); Harvard University (PhD, 1984)
- Known for: Director, Dark Energy Spectroscopic Instrument (DESI); BaBar detector construction Baryon acoustic oscillations measurements
- Spouse: Natalie Roe
- Children: 2
- Relatives: Edward H. Levi (father); John G. Levi (brother); David F. Levi (brother)
- Awards: Fellow, American Association for the Advancement of Science (2023); Fellow, American Physical Society (2000)
- Scientific career
- Fields: Particle physics Observational cosmology Dark energy
- Workplaces: Lawrence Berkeley National Laboratory; SLAC National Accelerator Laboratory; CERN
- Thesis: Measurement of Electroweak Parameters in Leptonic Processes (1984)
- Doctoral advisor: Roy F. Schwitters
- Website: desi.lbl.gov

Michael Edward Levi is an American experimental physicist and senior scientist at Lawrence Berkeley National Laboratory (LBNL), and a Senior Space Fellow at the University of California, Berkeley Space Sciences Laboratory. He has led the Dark Energy Spectroscopic Instrument (DESI) since the project's formation in 2012, initially as project director during construction and later as director of the operating experiment.

Levi has worked on a succession of major experiments in particle physics and observational cosmology, including Mark II at SLAC, UA1 at CERN, the Superconducting Super Collider (SSC), and BaBar, before turning to dark energy experiments in the late 1990s.

Levi was elected a Fellow of the American Physical Society in 2000 and a Fellow of the American Association for the Advancement of Science in 2023.

== Education ==
Levi received his PhD in physics from Harvard University in 1984 under the supervision of Roy F. Schwitters, with a dissertation on experimental high-energy physics.

== Career ==
=== Early career ===
While an undergraduate, Levi worked on detector development at the Naval Research Laboratory under Herbert Friedman, and on the DUMAND project under Larry Sulak. For his doctoral work he joined the Mark II collaboration at SLAC, first while the detector was installed at SPEAR and then at the PEP ring, writing a thesis on weak neutral currents in e^{+}e^{-} interactions.

=== Particle physics ===
After completing his PhD, Levi was a scientific associate on the UA1 experiment at CERN in Geneva, Switzerland, working under Carlo Rubbia. He later worked at SLAC under Burton Richter on the Mark II experiment at the SLC, where he built the energy spectrometers used for the experiment's 1989 measurements of the Z boson resonance parameters, including a precise determination of the mass.

In the 1990s, Levi worked first on the conceptual design for the Solenoidal Detector Collaboration (SDC) experiment at the SSC, and later on the construction of the BaBar detector at SLAC's PEP-II B-factory, where he developed the charged-track trigger and drift chamber readout electronics. BaBar reported the first observation of CP violation outside the kaon system in 2001.

=== Instrumentation and transition to cosmology ===
Beginning in the late 1990s, Levi contributed to the development of silicon detector technologies at LBNL, including thick, fully depleted CCDs developed by Stephen Holland and collaborators that were later widely adopted in astronomical instruments, including the Dark Energy Survey. Following the 1998 discovery of the accelerating expansion of the universe, Levi became involved in proposed space- and ground-based dark energy missions, including the SuperNova/Acceleration Probe (SNAP) concept co-led by Levi and Saul Perlmutter. SNAP was eventually folded into the Joint Dark Energy Mission (JDEM), on which Levi served as project scientist for the DOE and Neil Gehrels as lead project scientist for NASA. A variant concept, JDEM-Omega, was presented to the 2010 astronomy and astrophysics decadal survey. After the decadal survey recommended a wide-field infrared survey telescope (WFIRST) and ground-based dark energy spectroscopy as priorities, Levi shifted his focus to ground-based spectroscopic surveys while also contributing to the near-infrared instrumentation for the European Euclid mission.

=== Dark Energy Spectroscopic Instrument (DESI) ===
Levi co-led (with David Schlegel) the development of the BigBOSS concept, a proposed multi-object spectrograph for dark energy studies. In December 2012, Levi was appointed project director and tasked with merging the BigBOSS and DESpec proposals into a single experiment, DESI. The combined design and scientific goals were set out in a 2013 white paper. DESI was endorsed as a priority by the 2014 Particle Physics Project Prioritization Panel (P5) report Building for Discovery. As project director, Levi oversaw the construction, commissioning, and operations of the instrument on the Mayall 4-meter Telescope at Kitt Peak National Observatory.

== Awards and honors ==
Levi was elected a Fellow of the American Physical Society in 2000 and a Fellow of the American Association for the Advancement of Science in 2023. In 2020, the DESI construction project received the U.S. Department of Energy Secretary's Project Management Excellence Award for delivering the project on budget and schedule under Levi's direction.

== Public engagement ==
Levi has been active with the Chabot Space and Science Center since 2012, when he was appointed chair of the Joint Powers Authority board that oversees the museum.

== Personal life ==
Levi is married to physicist Natalie Roe, with whom he has two children. He is a son of Kate Sulzberger Levi and Edward H. Levi, who served as president of the University of Chicago and U.S. Attorney General. His brothers are David F. Levi, former chief U.S. district judge and former dean of Duke University School of Law, and John G. Levi, an attorney at Sidley Austin and chairman of the board of the Legal Services Corporation.
