= Legal education in Alaska =

Legal education in Alaska refers to the history of efforts to educate Alaskans in the laws of the state, including the education of those representing themselves before the courts, paralegals and the continuing legal education of Alaskan lawyers after their admission to the Alaska Bar Association. Since becoming the 49th state of the United States on January 3, 1959 Alaska has not had a public, American Bar Association-accredited law school. A 1975 study by former Alaska Attorney General (1970–1973) John E. Havelock concluded that the state did not require a law school. Without a state law school, Alaska did not receive a 2001 distribution of the complete legal papers of Abraham Lincoln and the Alaska Law Review has been published outside Alaska.

As of 2015, Alaska was the only state without a law school, but Seattle University School of Law has opened a satellite campus at Alaska Pacific University, where law students from any ABA accredited school can study Alaska-specific courses during summers or for part or all of their third (and final) year of law school. Also, although it still requires students to leave the state, as of 2021, University of Alaska Anchorage undergraduates can qualify for direct admission to Case Western Reserve University School of Law and Willamette University College of Law on an accelerated schedule.

== History ==
=== 1970s–2000s ===
The District (previously Department) of Alaska became an organized incorporated territory of the United States on August 24, 1912, and was admitted to the union as the 49th state on January 3, 1959. In 1971 the Los Angeles-based UCLA School of Law began publishing the Alaska Law Review, a semiannual publication devoted to legal issues pertinent to Alaskans. Funded by the Alaska Bar Association, the Alaska Law Review is provided to every Alaskan attorney in return for their ABA dues.

In 1975 former Alaska Attorney General (1970–1973) John E. Havelock published "Legal Education for a Frontier Society: A Survey of Alaskan Needs and Opportunities in Education, Research and the Delivery of Legal Services", the first comprehensive study on meeting the need for legal services in Alaska. Published on behalf of the University of Alaska Regents and the Alaska Legislative Council, it found that there were barely enough qualified Alaskans to support a law school. A 2013 summary of the 1975 study noted:

The study concludes that there is no need to increase the supply of lawyers in Alaska by establishment of a law school and that many objectives which might be reached by a law school can also be reached by building on existing arrangements and models and development of other options for legal practice in Alaska such as paralegal training, particularly in rural areas of the state.

In 1983, Duke University School of Law took over the publication of the Alaska Law Review from UCLA. The following year, residents of Kenai founded the unaccredited Alaska Common Law School. The school offered a two-year program enabling students to represent themselves before Alaskan courts, with graduates receiving pre-law certificates. In June 1989, the University of Alaska Anchorage established a paralegal certificate program. In 1994 the University of Alaska Anchorage and Alaska Academy of Trial Lawyers sponsored a weekly Community Law School course at Central Junior High School in Anchorage, with local attorneys teaching property, personal injury, employment and criminal law and providing legal information about insurance contracts. In 1998, the accredited William S. Boyd School of Law at the University of Nevada, Las Vegas left Alaska as the only U.S. state without a law school.

The following year, the parents of Seattle University president Stephen Sundborg (and former 26-year residents of Alaska) George and Mary Sundborg donated $1 million to the Seattle University School of Law Alaska Fund, a scholarship for Alaskan law students. Addressing the donation, to a school 2,000 miles (3,200 kilometres) southeast of Alaska, the president noted that Alaska was the only state without a law school: "As an Alaskan myself, I seek as president of Seattle University to develop this educational service to Alaska in many ways. It was because of this commitment and in order to begin this broader initiative that I asked my own parents for the initial gift to the Alaska Fund." The elder Sundborg (one of the 55 signers of the Alaska State Constitution, a copy of which was displayed at Seattle University at the time of the donation) was an editor of newspapers in Juneau and Fairbanks, general manager of the Alaska Development Board and assistant to Governor and United States Senator Ernest Gruening. That year, Seattle University devoted a school-library room to Alaskan law "to better serve the legal community in Alaska" and bid (unsuccessfully) to publish the Alaska Law Review.

=== 2000s ===
In February 2003 Havelock proposed Anchorage as a permanent home for the World Economic Forum, since the city was known as the "Air Crossroads of the World." Noting that Alaska is the only state without a law school, he proposed a law school with "an international flair" to strengthen the research capability of an Anchorage-based forum and felt that the combination of a World Economic Forum home and an international law school would attract related non-governmental organizations to settle in Anchorage. In May 2003, Alaskan attorney and real-estate broker Kirk Wickersham registered the name "Alaska Law School, Inc." with the Alaska Department of Commerce, Community and Economic Development. In June of that year, Wickersham delivered a speech entitled "Development of a Law School in Alaska" to the monthly Harvard and Yale Clubs of Alaska meeting in Anchorage. Later that month, the Supreme Court of the United States noted the absence of a public, American Bar Association (ABA)-accredited law school in Alaska in Grutter v. Bollinger. In February 2004, the Institute of Social and Economic Research at the University of Alaska Anchorage issued a study finding little economic justification for a law school. In April 2004, the Maryland Daily Record noted that continuing legal education was not mandatory for Alaska attorneys. In April 2007, Alaskan attorney and University of Alaska Anchorage instructor Terry C. Aglietti registered the name "Alaska School of Law, Limited" with the Alaska Department of Commerce, Community and Economic Development.

At the end of 2007 the Anchorage Daily News published Wickersham's "Alaska Would Benefit From Homegrown Lawyers, Judges", calling for Alaska to begin educating its own attorneys. He noted that Alaska had the highest number of lawyers and the smallest number law students per capita of the small Western states (Alaska, Montana, North Dakota, South Dakota and Wyoming), attributing the latter to the cost of out-of-state tuition and opposition from student spouses (who did not want to leave Alaska). Wickersham was also concerned that, in addition to leaving their home state, Alaskan law students had to "learn the laws of some other state" before learning local laws (such as the Alaska Constitution, the Alaska Native Claims Settlement Act and the Alaska National Interest Lands Conservation Act) after returning to Alaska. About two weeks later, the newspaper published a commentary by Havelock which also called for the formation of an Alaskan law school. In contrast to his 1975 view that there "were then just barely enough qualified Alaskans to generate a student body," he noted that by 2008 Alaska's population had doubled. The state had stabilized, with a strong economy and "a well established" place in international trade, and Havelock felt that the time had come for Alaska to develop its "intellectual resources" rather than losing them to other states in a brain drain. In March 2008, about a year after forming Alaska School of Law Limited, Aglietti dissolved the limited liability company and formed the Anchorage-based, nonprofit Alaska School of Law with Aglietti, Offret & Woofteri law-firm members Christopher M. Cromer and Ronald A. Offret.

=== 2010s ===
In December 2010 Alaskan state representative Scott Kawasaki proposed legislation creating the state's first law and medical schools, with the law school in Anchorage. Kawasaki cited high legal costs, his desire for the state to be a model for tribal and environmental law and not losing Alaskan law talent to the lower 48 states as reasons for the legislation. In reply, the University of Alaska System noted that "adding graduate programs would require an analysis of student demand and the work force needed to staff" a law school. On January 7, 2011 Kawasaki introduced Alaska House Bill (HB) 38, "University Institutes Of Law And Medicine" at the University of Alaska, to the 2011 legislative session. A day after the bill was introduced, it was opposed by legislators "who question the cost and the need for Alaska to have the schools." A commentator replied that due to the absence of an Alaskan law school, the Alaska Law Review had been published by the UCLA and Duke University Schools of Law. The Juneau Empire opposed an Alaska law school in a January 16 editorial, saying that "the idea of creating Alaska's own JD factory should be quickly dismissed." Asserting that Alaska has had little trouble attracting lawyers and the U.S. has too many attorneys (rather than Alaska having too few), the newspaper proposed:

The seed money required to launch a law school could go to better use to endow scholarships for bright Alaskans to go outside for a fully funded legal education, in the same vein as the WWAMI program for Alaska's medical students. It could also be used to better fund district attorney's offices, Legal Aid, victims' compensation and public defenders programs."

The House referred the bill to the Education and Finance Committees on January 18, 2011.

In 2013, Alaska remained the only state without a law school, and Alaskans were required to spend three years outside their home state to earn a Juris Doctor degree. In February of that year, Kawasaki and state senator Beth Kerttula reintroduced (and cosponsored) legislation creating the state's first law and medical schools. The law-school portion of the text introduced in the 28th Legislature (2013–2014) read:

Sec. 14.40.083. Establishment of Institute of Law. The University of Alaska may establish an Institute of Law at the University of Alaska Anchorage to provide a program of education and research in law and related fields. When established, the Institute of Law shall provide for the issuance of the degree of juris doctor according to generally accepted national accreditation standards. The powers, duties, and functions of the Board of Regents pertaining to the University of Alaska extend to the Institute of Law in the same manner as to other departments or institutes of the university.

In June 2014, Seattle University School of Law announced that it would work with Alaska Pacific University (APU) to develop an American Bar Association-accredited law program at the APU, allowing Seattle University School of Law students from Alaska to study law at APU during summers and their third (and final) year of law school. The project had the support of the Alaska Court System and former Chief Justice Dana Fabe. The program received American Bar Association approval in late 2014 and began accepting applications for the Fall 2015 semester.

In 2021, in lieu of establishing its own law school, the University of Alaska Anchorage entered into agreements with Case Western Reserve University School of Law and Willamette University College of Law to provide UAA undergraduates with a direct admissions pipeline to those schools, reducing the typical 7 year legal education path (4 year Bachelor's + 3 year JD) to a 6 year 3+3 program.

== See also ==
- Education in Alaska
