= David Voluck =

American judge, attorney, and author

- Born: Philadelphia, Pennsylvania, U.S.
- Education: University of Pennsylvania; Lewis & Clark Law School
- Occupations: Judge and author

David Avraham Voluck is an American judge, attorney, and author known for his specialization in federal Indian law and his long-standing service as a tribal court judge in Alaska. He is recognized for his work in developing tribal justice systems, particularly within the Tlingit and Haida communities, and for co-authoring the definitive legal treatise Alaska Natives and American Laws. He has credited the Native tribes with helping him become a more observant Jew.

== Early life and education ==
Voluck was born and raised in Philadelphia, Pennsylvania. He attended the University of Pennsylvania, where he earned a bachelor's degree with a focus on the sociology of religion. He later moved to the Pacific Northwest to attend the Lewis & Clark Law School, receiving his Juris Doctor in 1995 with a certificate in environmental and natural resources law. During his time there, he was inducted into the Cornelius Honor Society.

== Career ==
=== Legal practice and early appointments ===
Following law school graduation, Voluck moved to Sitka, Alaska, in 1996 to begin his career working for the Sitka Tribe of Alaska. He first served as the land and trust resources attorney before being promoted to the director of the Tribe's Law and Trust Resources Department. In 1998, he joined the firm of Landye, Bennette, and Blumstein, LLP in Anchorage, specializing in Federal Indian law and traveling to rural villages to represent both municipal and tribal governments.

=== Judicial career and legal philosophy ===
Voluck's judicial career began in 2008 when he was appointed chief judge of the Sitka Tribal Court (Sitka Tribe of Alaska), where he primarily serves members of the Tlingit and Haida nations. His approach to justice focuses heavily on non-adversarial, restorative, and traditional legal practices. He is known for presiding over a Tribal Healing to Wellness Court, a long-term therapeutic program for individuals dealing with substance abuse problems, emphasizing rehabilitation, community solutions, sanctions, and incentives rather than punitive sentencing. Voluck is notable as the state's only non-Native tribal judge. His subsequent judicial appointments include:

- magistrate/judge for the Central Council of Tlingit and Haida Indian Tribes of Alaska (appointed 2010).
- judge pro tem for the Aleut Community of St. Paul Island Tribal Government (appointed 2012).
- judge for the Chickaloon Village Traditional Council and the Kodiak archipelago intertribal court.

Voluck is also a faculty member for the National Judicial College's National Tribal Judicial Center and the National Tribal Trial College, where he lectures on tribal law, tribal courts, and native culture.

=== Authorship and recognition ===
Voluck is the co-author, alongside David S. Case, of the legal treatise Alaska Natives and American Laws. The book, which discusses the history and unique legal relationship of Alaskan Natives with the federal government, is considered a significant work in the field and has been revised through multiple editions (including the second and third editions). In 2014, Voluck was honored with the Alaska Bar Association's Judge Nora Guinn Award. The award recognized his "extraordinary and sustained efforts to assist Alaska's rural residents, especially its Native population, in overcoming language and cultural barriers to obtaining justice." He was the first tribal judge to receive this award.

== Personal life and religious views ==
Voluck is an Orthodox Jew, affiliated with the Chabad-Lubavitch movement. His work with Alaskan Natives is cited as having deepened his interest in his own religious heritage, leading him to take a two-year sabbatical from legal practice to study Talmudic and Jewish legal studies at the Rabbinical College of America in Morristown, New Jersey. The Tlingit people of Sitka bestowed upon him a tribal name, Aan S'aati, which translates to "Caretaker for the Land". Voluck has noted similarities between traditional Alaskan Native spiritual values and Judaism, particularly concerning the reverence for the Creator as a unifying force present in all creation and the importance of ecological stewardship. The tribal court even has an "aboriginal Seder plate", taking elements from both cultures to make the room more comfortable.

== Bibliography ==
- Case, David S., and David Avraham Voluck. Alaska Natives and American Laws. 2nd ed. (2002) and 3rd ed. (2012). University of Alaska Press.
