= Paul Carrington =

Paul Carrington may refer to:

- Paul Carrington (judge) (1733–1818), 18th century US political official and jurist from Virginia
- Paul Carrington (American football) (born 1982), American football player
- Paul Carrington (professor) (1931–2021), American law professor
