= Edward H. Levi =

71st United States Attorney General (1911–2000)

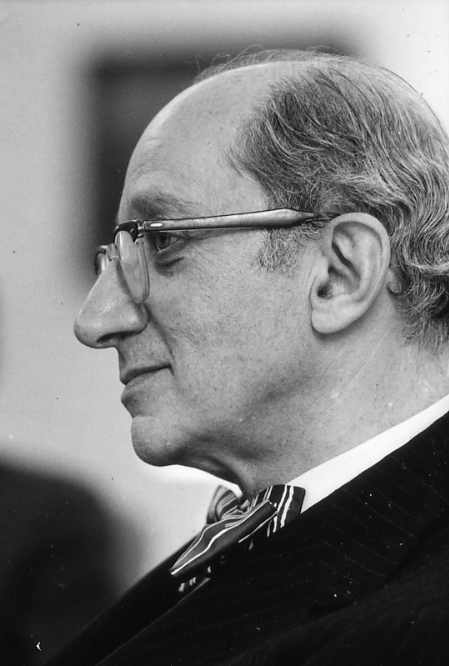

71st United States Attorney General
- In office February 7, 1975 – January 20, 1977
- President: Gerald Ford
- Deputy: Laurence Silberman; Harold R. Tyler Jr.
- Preceded by: William B. Saxbe
- Succeeded by: Griffin Bell

7th President of the University of Chicago
- In office November 14, 1968 – February 5, 1975
- Preceded by: George Beadle
- Succeeded by: John T. Wilson

Personal details
- Born: Edward Hirsch Levi; June 26, 1911 Chicago, Illinois, U.S.
- Died: March 7, 2000 (aged 88) Chicago, Illinois, U.S.
- Party: Republican
- Spouse: Kate Levi
- Children: 3, including John, David, Michael
- Education: University of Chicago (AB, JD); Yale University (JSD)

Edward Hirsch Levi (June 26, 1911 – March 7, 2000) was an American legal scholar and academic. He served as the 5th dean of the University of Chicago Law School from 1950 to 1962, as the 8th president of the University of Chicago from 1968 to 1975, and then as United States Attorney General from 1975 to 1977 under President Gerald Ford.

Levi is regularly cited as the "model of a modern attorney general", the "greatest lawyer of his time", and is credited with restoring order after Watergate. He is considered, along with Yale's Whitney Griswold, the greatest of postwar American university presidents.

A native of Chicago, Levi graduated from the University of Chicago and Yale University. He served as a special assistant to the U.S. Attorney General during World War II before returning to the University of Chicago Law School, where he was later named dean. After leaving government service in the Ford administration, Levi returned to teaching in Chicago.

== Early life and education ==
Levi was born in Chicago, the son of Elsa B. (née Hirsch) and Gerson B. Levi, a rabbi from Scotland. His maternal grandfather was Reform rabbi Emil Gustav Hirsch, son of the German philosopher and rabbi Samuel Hirsch. He received his A.B. Phi Beta Kappa from the undergraduate college of the University of Chicago in 1932, and later his J.D. at the University of Chicago Law School in 1935. The following year he was named an assistant professor of law at the Law School and was admitted to the Illinois bar. He earned a J.S.D. from Yale Law School, where he was also a Sterling Fellow in 1938. Levi was an early member of the National Lawyers Guild.

== Education and political career ==
During World War II he served as a special assistant to the Attorney General of the United States. In 1945, he returned to the University of Chicago Law School and was named dean of the law school in 1950. In 1950, he also worked as chief counsel for the Subcommittee on Monopoly Power of the U.S. House Committee on the Judiciary. He resigned as law school dean and became provost of the university in 1962. That same year, he was elected to the American Academy of Arts and Sciences.

He was a member of the White House Central Group on Domestic Affairs in 1964, the White House Task Force on Education from 1966 to 1967 and the President's Task Force on Priorities in Higher Education from 1969 to 1970.

He became the University of Chicago's president in 1968, serving until 1975, when President Gerald R. Ford appointed him 71st Attorney General of the United States. Levi was the first Jewish Attorney General of the United States. During his presidency of the University of Chicago he refused to call the Chicago City Police to evict students occupying the university administrative building.

During his term as Attorney General, he issued a set of guidelines (in 1976) to limit the activities of the FBI. These guidelines required the FBI to show evidence of a crime before using secret police techniques like wiretaps or entering someone's home without warning. These guidelines were replaced by new ones issued in 1983 by Ronald Reagan's Attorney General, William French Smith. He urged President Ford to appoint Judge Arlin Adams, Robert Bork, who was his former student and Solicitor General, or fellow Chicagoan John Paul Stevens to the United States Supreme Court, and Ford followed his advice appointing John Paul Stevens. Serving under him, in various high staff positions, were such people as Rudolph Giuliani, Robert Bork, Antonin Scalia, Rex E. Lee, and Arthur Raymond Randolph. Levi later testified in support of Bork at his confirmation hearing.

Levi filed a lawsuit preventing the formation of the Westheimer Independent School District, a proposed school district in Texas that was to break away from the Houston Independent School District, on the grounds of the U.S. Voting Rights Act as his last official action before leaving his post as Attorney General.

== Later career ==
After his term as Attorney General, he returned to teaching at the University of Chicago's Law School and College. He was a visiting professor at Stanford University Law School from 1977 to 1978. He was the author of An Introduction to Legal Reasoning, which was first published in 1949 and his speeches were collected in Point of View: Talks on Education. He was also a trustee of the University of Chicago and the MacArthur Foundation, and was a chairman and a member of the Council on Legal Education for Professional Responsibility. He was a member of the American Philosophical Society.

== Personal life ==
Levi married Kate Sulzberger (formerly Hecht) in 1946. They had three sons, John Gerson, David Frank, and Michael Edward: John is a prominent attorney in Sidley Austin's Chicago office and served as chair of the board of directors of the Legal Services Corporation; David is a former U.S. Attorney and federal judge in the Eastern District of California and 14th dean of Duke Law School; Michael is a scientist in both particle physics and cosmology at the Lawrence Berkeley National Laboratory.

Levi died from complications of Alzheimer's disease in Chicago on March 7, 2000, aged 88.

== Legacy ==
=== Edward H. Levi Award ===
In 2005, the Justice Department commemorated the 30th anniversary of his appointment as Attorney General with a ceremony and creation of the Edward H. Levi Award for Outstanding Professionalism and Exemplary Integrity.

The Award was established to pay tribute to the memory and achievements of Mr. Levi, whose career as an attorney, law professor and dean, and public servant exemplified these qualities in the best traditions of the Department. Friends and former colleagues, including former Secretary of Defense Donald H. Rumsfeld; U.S. Supreme Court Associate Justices John Paul Stevens and Antonin Scalia; former Attorney General Nicholas Katzenbach; and former U.S. Court of Appeals Judge and Solicitor General Robert H. Bork, gathered to honor Mr. Levi.

=== Levi Hall ===
The University of Chicago's primary administration building, holding the offices of the President and Provost, was renamed the Edward H. Levi Hall in 2013. A portrait of Levi hangs in the lobby of the building.

== See also ==
- List of Jewish American jurists
- List of Jewish United States Cabinet members

Academic offices
| Preceded by George W. Beadle | President of the University of Chicago; 1968–1975 | Succeeded by John T. Wilson |
Legal offices
| Preceded by William B. Saxbe | U.S. Attorney General; Served under: Gerald Ford; 1975–1977 | Succeeded by Griffin B. Bell |
