= John Levi =

John Levi is the name of several people including:

- John Levi (American football) (1898–1946), Arapaho Indian who played for the Haskell Indians
- John G. Levi, chairperson of the United States Legal Services Corporation
- John Levi (rabbi) (born 1934), first Australian-born rabbi
