= Kerry Abrams =

American law professor and academic administrator

Dean of the Duke University School of Law
- Incumbent
- Assumed office July 1, 2018
- Preceded by: David F. Levi

Personal details
- Born: 1971 (age 53–54)
- Spouse: Brandon Garrett
- Education: Swarthmore College (BA); Stanford University (JD)

Karen L. "Kerry" Abrams (born 1971) is an American law professor and academic administrator. She currently serves as the James B. Duke and Benjamin N. Duke Dean of the Duke University School of Law.

== Early life and education ==
Abrams grew up in Edmonds, Washington, with a schoolteacher mother and engineer father. She attended Swarthmore College, graduating with a B.A. in English with highest honors in 1993. Prior to attending Stanford Law School, she worked as an assistant at St. Martin's Press, a church organist, a secretary, and a department store clerk. During law school, she served as president of the Moot Court Board and the co-chair of Women of Stanford Law. She also worked as a research assistant for Professor Janet Halley. Abrams earned a J.D. at Stanford in 1998, in a graduating class that included other future law school deans Gillian Lester (Columbia) and Kimberly Yuracko (formerly dean at Northwestern).

== Legal and academic career ==
Following law school, Abrams served as a law clerk for Judge Stanwood R. Duval Jr. of the U.S. District Court for the Eastern District of Louisiana. She practiced as a commercial litigator for several years at the New York City law firm of Patterson, Belknap, Webb & Tyler LLP. Her law practice experience included pro bono work in a lawsuit against the Leben Home for Adults in Queens, New York, for providing unnecessary surgeries to mentally ill residents of the home. The case received national attention and eventually settled for $7 million.

Abrams served as acting assistant professor of lawyering at New York University School of Law from 2002 to 2005. She then joined the faculty of the University of Virginia Law School in 2005, working as a professor and later as the University's Vice Provost for Faculty Affairs. Abrams became the fifteenth Dean of Duke Law School in July 2018.

Abrams's scholarship focuses on the areas of immigration law and citizenship, family law, and gender and law. U.S. Supreme Court Associate Justice Sonia Sotomayor cited a 2013 article by Abrams in her dissenting opinion in Mutual Pharmaceutical Co. v. Bartlett.

== Selected works ==
- "Family, Gender, and Leadership in the Legal Profession," in Women & Law 1-17 (2020) (joint publication of the top sixteen law reviews)
- "Gender Journals and Gender Equality: Reflections on Twenty-five Years of the Duke Journal of Gender Law and Policy," 27 Duke Gender Journal of Law and Policy iii-vii (2020)
- "The Rights of Marriage: Obergefell, Din, and the Future of Constitutional Family Law," 103 Cornell Law Review 501-564 (2018)
- "No More Blood," in Debating Transformations of National Citizenship 121-125 (Rainer Bauböck, ed., 2018)
- "Family Reunification and the Security State," 42 Constitutional Commentary 247-280 (2017)
- "Immigration’s Family Values" (with R. Kent Piacenti), 100 Virginia Law Review 629-709 (2014)
- "Plenary Power Preemption," 99 Virginia Law Review 601-640 (2013)
- "What Makes the Family Special?" 80 University of Chicago Law Review 7-28 (2013)
- "Marriage Fraud," 100 California Law Review 1-67 (2012)
- "The Hidden Dimension of Nineteenth-Century Immigration Law," 62 Vanderbilt Law Review 1353-1418 (2009)
- "Immigration Law and the Regulation of Marriage," 91 Minnesota Law Review 1625-1709 (2007)
- "Polygamy, Prostitution, and the Federalization of Immigration Law," 105 Columbia Law Review 641-716 (2005)

== Personal life ==
Abrams is married to Brandon L. Garrett, L. Neil Williams, Jr. Professor of Law at Duke Law. They have two children.
