= Alaska Law Review =

American academic law journal

- Discipline: American law, General law
- Language: English

Publication details
- Former names: Alaska Law Journal; UCLA Alaska Law Review
- History: 1971–present
- Publisher: Duke Law School
- Frequency: Biannually

Standard abbreviations
- Bluebook: Alaska L. Rev.
- ISO 4: Alsk. Law Rev.

Indexing
- ISSN: 0883-0568 (print); 1930-6598 (web)

Links
- Journal homepage

The Alaska Law Review is an academic law journal that is devoted to legal issues relating to the State of Alaska. First published in 1971, since 1984 it has been published by students at Duke Law School in Durham, North Carolina every June and December. The journal is not published in Alaska, because no law school operates within the state. The Alaska Law Review is funded by the Alaska Bar Association and a copy of the Alaska Law Review is provided to every Alaskan attorney as part of the dues to the Alaska Bar Association.

== History ==
In 1971, the Los Angeles, California law school UCLA School of Law began publishing the Alaska Law Review as the Alaska Law Journal (from 1963 to 1971), then as UCLA Alaska Law Review (from 1971 to 1983), taking its current name in 1984. The review is published every June and December. In 1983, the Alaska Bar Association selected Duke University School of Law in Durham, North Carolina to take over publication of the Alaska Law Review. The Alaska Law Review is funded by the Alaska Bar Association and a copy of the Alaska Law Review is provide to every Alaskan attorney as part of the dues to the Alaska Bar Association. Because the Alaska Bar Association distributes a copy of the Alaska Law Review to every one of its members, numbering approximately 3000 lawyers in 2008, the Alaska Law Review is "one of the most widely circulated law journals" in America.
