= Edward Dean Price =

American judge

Senior Judge of the United States District Court for the Eastern District of California
- In office December 31, 1989 – November 3, 1997

Judge of the United States District Court for the Eastern District of California
- In office December 20, 1979 – December 31, 1989
- Appointed by: Jimmy Carter
- Preceded by: Seat established by 92 Stat. 1629
- Succeeded by: David F. Levi

Personal details
- Born: Edward Dean Price; February 12, 1919 Sanger, California, U.S.
- Died: November 3, 1997 (aged 78)
- Education: University of California, Berkeley (AB); UC Berkeley School of Law (LLB)

Edward Dean Price (February 12, 1919 – November 3, 1997) was a United States district judge of the United States District Court for the Eastern District of California.

== Education and career ==
Born in Sanger, California, Price received an Artium Baccalaureus degree from the University of California, Berkeley in 1947 and a Bachelor of Laws from the UC Berkeley School of Law in 1949. He was in the United States Army during World War II, from 1942 to 1946. He was in private practice in Modesto, California from 1949 to 1979.

== Federal judicial service ==
Price was nominated by President Jimmy Carter on November 1, 1979, to the United States District Court for the Eastern District of California, to a new seat created by 92 Stat. 1629. He was confirmed by the United States Senate on December 19, 1979, and received his commission on December 20, 1979. He assumed senior status on December 31, 1989. Price served in that capacity until his death on November 3, 1997.

== Death ==
Price died on November 3, 1997 in Modesto, Stanislaus County and was buried in Lakewood Memorial Park.

== Sources ==
Legal offices
Preceded by Seat established by 92 Stat. 1629	Judge of the United States District Court for the Eastern District of California; 1979–1989	Succeeded by David F. Levi
