= Natalie Roe =

Experimental particle physicist

- Born: Natalie Ann Roe
- Education: Harvard University; Stanford University
- Awards: APS Fellow; AAAS Fellow
- Scientific career
- Fields: Experimental Particle Physics; Cosmology
- Workplaces: LBNL; Fermilab; SLAC; CERN
- Academic advisors: Carlo Rubbia

Natalie Ann Roe is an experimental particle physicist and observational cosmologist, and the Associate Laboratory Director for the Physical Sciences Area at Lawrence Berkeley National Laboratory (LBNL) since 2020. Previously, she was the Physics Division Director for eight years. She has been a Fellow of the American Physical Society (APS) and the American Association for the Advancement of Science (AAAS).

== Education ==
Roe earned her undergraduate degree in physics from Harvard University in 1981, and her doctoral degree from Stanford University in 1989. She joined the Lawrence Berkeley National Laboratory as a postdoc in 1989, where she is currently the Associate Laboratory Director for the Physical Sciences Area.

== Research career and collaborations ==
Roe particle physics research career has included the analysis of subatomic particle properties in accelerator-based experiments at SLAC and Fermi National Accelerator laboratories, and her cosmology research has involved surveys using telescopes based in Arizona, New Mexico, and Chile to study the mystery of dark energy including the Baryon Oscillation Spectroscopic Survey (BOSS), the Dark Energy Survey (DES) and the Dark Energy Spectroscopic Instrument (DESI).

She started her career in high energy physics with Professor Carlo Rubbia during her undergrad, which leads her to get a job at CERN for a year on the UA1 experiment. This experience at CERN plays a big impact on her ultimate career path in particle physics. During her PhD, she searched for Anomalous Single Photon at SLAC.

She started as a postdoc at Lawrence Berkeley National Laboratory in 1989 on the D0 experiment at Fermilab. She has a strong interest in instrumentation and has built the electromagnetic calorimeter on the D0 and analyised the production and decay of W and Z bosons at the Fermilab Tevatron, led the design and construction of the Silicon Vertex Tracker for the BaBar experiment at SLAC from 1993 to 2005, and was the Instrument Scientist for the BOSS experiment designed to study the mystery of dark energy. As group leader for the LBNL MicroSystems Laboratory for almost 10 years, she was responsible for the fabrication of the science CCDs for both DES and BOSS.

She has served on many community panels including High Energy Physics Advisory Panel (HEPAP), the National Science Foundation Physics Division Committee of Visitors, the FNAL Physics Advisory Committee (PAC), and the Neutrino Science Advisory Group, and she is a past Chair of the American Physical Society (APS) Division of Particles and Fields. She has also been a member of the International Committee on Future Accelerators (ICFA) from 2007 to 2009 and the DESY Scientific Council, and served on the CERN Scientific Policy Committee and several other national and international councils.

Natalie is also a founding member of the Berkeley Lab Women Scientists and Engineers Council and is co-leading a laboratory-wide initiative to improve diversity and inclusion at the Lab.

== Honors and awards ==
Roe has been awarded as American Physical Society Fellow in 2001 for her leadership in the design and construction of the BaBar silicon vertex detector, and her studies of BB mixing, oscillations, and CP violation in B meson decays. In honor of her contributions to science and technology, she has been awarded as the Fellow of the American Association for the Advancement of Science in 2020.
