= David F. Levi =

American judge (born 1951)

David Levi
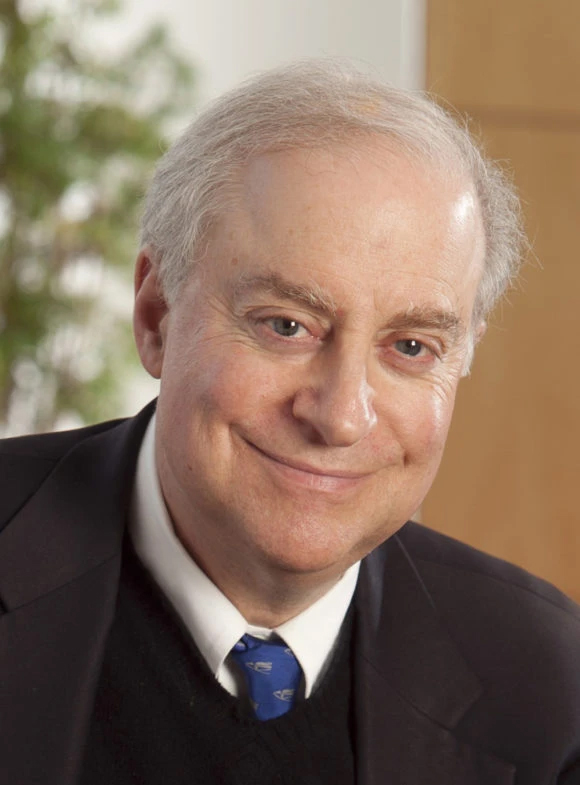
- Levi in 2022

14th Dean of the Duke University School of Law
- In office July 1, 2007 – July 1, 2018
- Preceded by: Katharine Bartlett
- Succeeded by: Kerry Abrams

Chief Judge of the United States District Court for the Eastern District of California
- In office 2003–2007
- Preceded by: William B. Shubb
- Succeeded by: Garland Ellis Burrell Jr.

Judge of the United States District Court for the Eastern District of California
- In office October 1, 1990 – June 30, 2007
- Appointed by: George H. W. Bush
- Preceded by: Edward Dean Price
- Succeeded by: John Mendez

United States Attorney for the Eastern District of California
- In office 1986–1990
- President: Ronald Reagan
- Preceded by: Donald B. Ayer
- Succeeded by: George O'Connell

Personal details
- Born: David Frank Levi; August 29, 1951 (age 74) Chicago, Illinois, U.S.
- Spouse: Nancy Ranney Levi
- Children: 2
- Parent: Edward H. Levi (father)
- Relatives: John G. Levi (brother)
- Education: Harvard University (BA, MA); Stanford University (JD)

David Frank Levi (born August 29, 1951) is an American jurist and former dean of the Duke University School of Law. From 1990 to 2007, he was a United States district judge of the United States District Court for the Eastern District of California, serving as Chief Judge from 2003 to 2007. He had been mentioned as a possible nominee to the Supreme Court.

== Early life and education ==
Levi was born in Chicago, Illinois. His father was Edward H. Levi, a former president of the University of Chicago and United States Attorney General under President Gerald R. Ford. His great-grandfather was A.G. Becker. He received a Bachelor of Arts degree from Harvard University in history and literature magna cum laude in 1972 and then entered the graduate program in history at Harvard where he eventually specialized in English legal history, receiving a Master of Arts. He received his Juris Doctor in 1980 from the Stanford Law School, where he graduated Order of the Coif and was president of the Stanford Law Review.

== Career ==
From 1980 to 1981, Levi served as clerk for Judge Ben C. Duniway of the United States Court of Appeals for the Ninth Circuit and from 1981 to 1982 as clerk for Supreme Court Justice Lewis F. Powell Jr. In 1983, he joined the United States Attorney's Office for the Eastern District of California as a prosecutor. In 1986 he was appointed by President Ronald Reagan as the United States Attorney for the Eastern District of California. Levi directed a major corruption investigation involving several California legislators and was also a member of the Attorney General's Advisory Committee and Chair of the Public Corruption Committee of United States Attorneys.

== Federal judicial service ==
Levi was nominated by President George H. W. Bush on August 3, 1990, to a seat on the United States District Court for the Eastern District of California vacated by Judge Edward Dean Price. He was confirmed by the United States Senate on September 28, 1990, and received commission on October 1, 1990. He served as Chief Judge from 2003 to 2007. His service terminated on June 30, 2007, due to resignation.

In 1994 Levi was appointed by Chief Justice William Rehnquist to the Advisory Committee on the Federal Rules of Civil Procedure. He was appointed Chair of the Civil Rules Committee in 2000. In October 2003 he was appointed Chair of the Standing Committee on the Rules of Practice and Procedure, which sits at the top of the federal judiciary's rulemaking process; in 2010 he was reappointed by Chief Justice John Roberts to serve as a member of that committee.

== Other service ==
He was the first president and a founder of the Milton L. Schwartz American Inn of Court, now the Schwartz-Levi American Inn of Court, at the King Hall School of Law, University of California at Davis, and has served as Chair of the Ninth Circuit's Task Force on Race, Religious and Ethnic Fairness and as the President of the Ninth Circuit District Judges Association.

In 2005, Levi was elected to the Council of the American Law Institute (ALI) and currently is serving as its president. A member of the ALI since 1991, Judge Levi was an Adviser to its Federal Judicial Code Revision Project and an Adviser to the institute's new Principles of the Law of Aggregate Litigation. He was elected a fellow of the American Academy of Arts and Sciences in 2007.

When Levi stepped down as dean of Duke Law School on June 30, 2018, he became the inaugural director of the school's Carl and Susan Bolch Judicial Institute founded that year with the mission of "advancing the importance of rule-of-law principles and a fair and independent judiciary and raising public awareness during lapses or failures in the rule of law." Levi retired from the Institute on June 30, 2022, and was named the director emeritus of the Bolch Judicial Institute and the James B. Duke and Benjamin N. Duke Dean Emeritus of Law of Duke University. In 2026, he was awarded the Bolch Prize for the Rule of Law by the Bolch Judicial Institute in recognition of his judicial and academic service.

He is co-author of Federal Trial Objections (James 2002). He is on the Rehnquist Center's National Board of Advisers.

== Personal ==
Levi married Nancy Ryerson Ranney in 1973. He and his wife have two sons, Joseph Ranney Levi and William Ranney "Will" Levi. Like his father, Will Levi is also an attorney and former Supreme Court clerk. He worked for Justice Samuel Alito during October Term 2011 and served as chief of staff to Attorney General Bill Barr.

== See also ==
- List of Jewish American jurists
- List of law clerks for the first seat of the Supreme Court of the United States

Legal offices
Preceded by Edward Dean Price	Judge of the United States District Court for the Eastern District of California; 1990–2007	Succeeded by John Mendez
Preceded by William B. Shubb	Chief Judge of the United States District Court for the Eastern District of California; 2003–2007	Succeeded by Garland Ellis Burrell Jr.
