= Nora Guinn =

American judge

- Born: Nora Venes; November 11, 1920; Akiak, Territory of Alaska, United States
- Died: July 6, 2005 (aged 84); Alaska, United States
- Occupation: Judge
- Known for: First woman and first Alaska Native to be a District Court Judge in Alaska

Nora Guinn (November 11, 1920 – July 6, 2005) was an American judge. In 2009, she was inducted into the Alaska Women's Hall of Fame. She was the first woman and first Alaska Native to be a District Court Judge in Alaska.

== Early life and education ==
Nora Venes was born in 1920 in Akiak, Alaska. Her parents were named Joe and Anna Venes. She went to school at Eklutna as a child. She moved to Portland, Oregon to attend high school. In 1939, she married Charlie Guinn. They moved back to Alaska. They married in Bethel, Alaska and lived and worked in Tununak. They worked for the Bureau of Indian Affairs, teaching. They moved back to Bethel in 1945 to raise their 10 children.

== Career ==
Guinn became United States Commissioner before Alaska became a state. After Alaska became a state, she became the first magistrate of Bethel in 1959. She became District Court Judge for the state, in 1967, despite not being a lawyer. This made her the first woman, and first Alaska Native, to serve as a District Court Judge. She became involved in educating law enforcement and the judicial community about the needs and rights of Alaska Natives. She worked closely with Sadie Brower Neakok. In court, Guinn would speak to defendants in English, and also in Yupik as necessary. She retired in 1976. In 1978, she was given an honorary doctorate by the University of Alaska Anchorage.

== Later life and legacy ==
Bella Hammond gave Guinn the First Lady's Volunteer Award in 1979. She was named Alaska Native Woman of the Year Award in 1983. The following year she was named Calista Citizen of the Year. Charlie Guinn died in 1993. Nora Guinn died in 2005. In 2009, she was inducted into the Alaska Women's Hall of Fame. The Alaska Bar Association named an award after Guinn. In 2007, the city of Bethel named the Bethel Courthouse after Guinn.
