= List of city nicknames in Alaska =

Aliases of Alaskan towns and cities

This partial list of city nicknames in Alaska compiles the aliases, sobriquets and slogans that cities and towns in Alaska are known by (or have been known by historically), officially and unofficially, to municipal governments, local people, outsiders or their tourism boards or chambers of commerce.

City nicknames can help establish a civic identity, help outsiders recognize a community, attract people to a community because of its nickname, promote civic pride, and build community unity.

Nicknames and slogans that successfully create a new community "ideology or myth" are also believed to have economic value. This value is difficult to measure, but there are anecdotal reports of cities that have achieved substantial economic benefits by "branding" themselves with new slogans.

Some unofficial nicknames are positive, while others are derisive. The unofficial nicknames listed here have been in use for a long time or have gained wide currency.

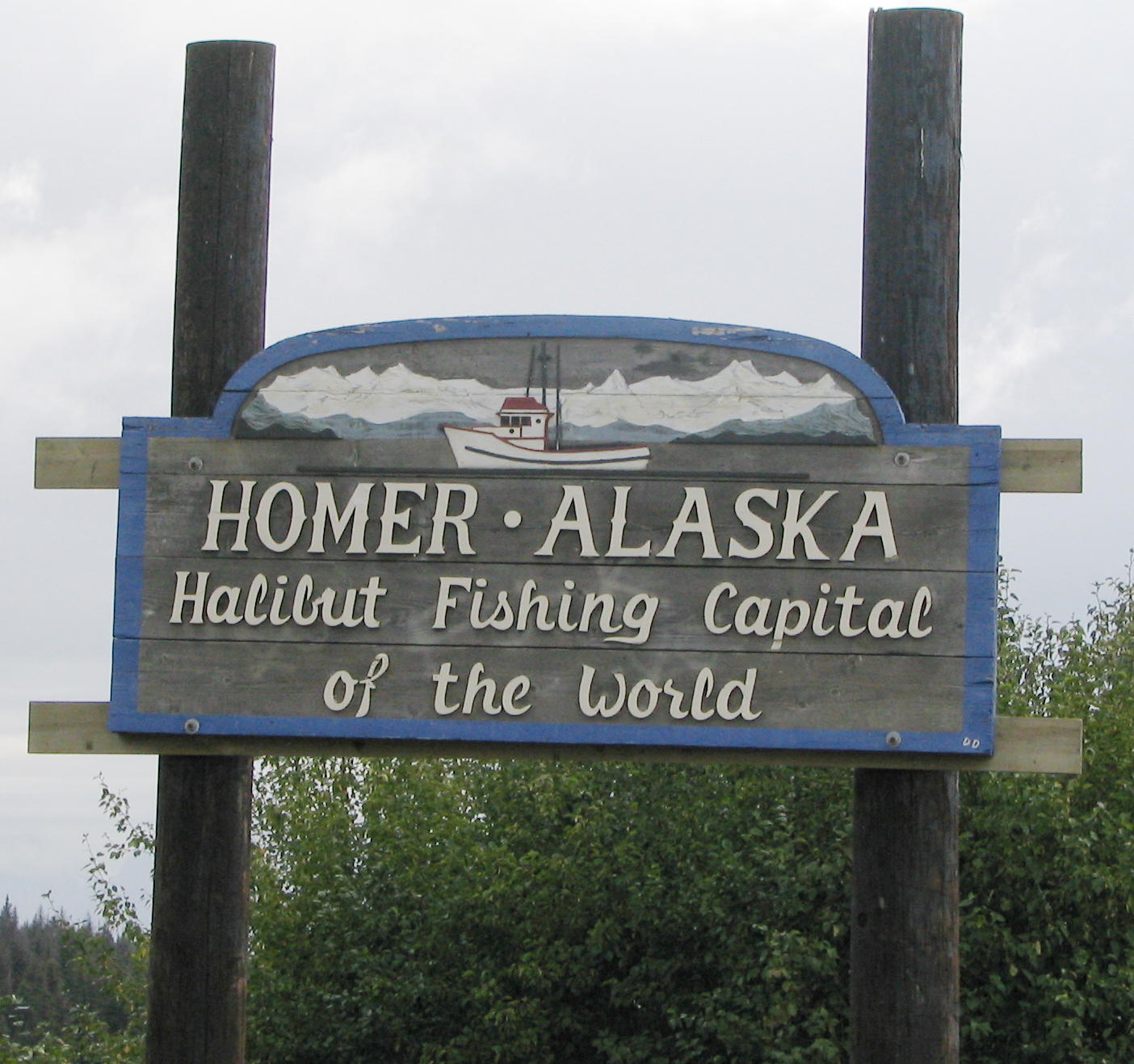
Homer's welcome sign proclaims its nickname.

- Anchorage
  - Air Crossroads of the World
  - Anchortown
  - The City of Lights and Flowers (or City of Lights)
  - Hanging Basket Capital of the World
  - Los Anchorage
  - Rage City (in reference to roller derby and punk culture)
  - Stanky Anky
- Cordova
  - Clam Town
- Fairbanks – The Golden Heart City
  - Scarebanks
  - Squarebanks
- Haines – Eagle Capital of America
- Homer
  - Halibut Capital of the World; Halibut Fishing Capital of the World
  - Cosmic Hamlet by the Sea
- Kenai – The Village With a Past, the City With a Future
- Ketchikan – King Salmon Capital of the World
- Knik – Dog-Mushing Center of the World
- Kodiak – King Crab Capital
- Sitka
  - First City of Alaska
  - The Natural Place to Visit
  - The Rock

== See also ==
- List of city nicknames in the United States
- List of places in Alaska
