= John G. Levi =

American government official (born 1948)

John Levi

Chair of the Legal Services Corporation
- Incumbent
- Assumed office April 7, 2010
- President: Barack Obama; Donald Trump; Joe Biden
- Preceded by: Frank Strickland

Personal details
- Born: October 9, 1948 (age 77) Chicago, Illinois, U.S.
- Party: Democratic
- Spouse: Jill Levi
- Children: 3
- Relatives: Edward H. Levi (father); David F. Levi (brother)
- Education: University of Rochester (BA); Harvard University (JD)

John Gerson Levi is an American attorney. He is senior counsel in Sidley Austin's Chicago office. He currently serves as board chair of the Legal Services Corporation and a member of the American Academy of Arts and Sciences. He was nominated to serve on the board by President Barack Obama on August 6, 2009, and his nomination was confirmed by the U.S. Senate on March 19, 2010. He was elected chairman of the LSC Board by his fellow board members on April 7, 2010.

Levi played a pivotal role in Obama's early career. Barack met his future wife Michelle Obama at the Chicago law firm Sidley Austin, where Levi is a partner. Newton N. Minow describes his and Levi's role in bringing the two together: "My daughter Martha called to say that one of her best students, Barack Obama, wanted to spend the summer as a law firm associate in Chicago," said Minow, referring to his daughter, law professor Martha Minow. "I called our partner John Levi, who heads our recruiting for the firm, and suggested this; John laughed and told me that he had already heard about Barack and had already hired him."

Levi was born in Chicago, Illinois, to Kate (née Sulzberger) and Edward H. Levi. His father was president of the University of Chicago from 1968 to 1975 and United States Attorney General under President Gerald R. Ford. He received an undergraduate degree from the University of Rochester with honors in 1969. He received his J.D. degree in 1972, and his LL.M. in 1973, from Harvard Law School. He is married to Jill Felsenthal and they have three children, Benjamin, Daniel, and Sarah. Ben Levi is co-founder of legal technology startup Ontra (formerly InCloudCounsel) and is married to Millie Tadewaldt, founder and CEO of branded merch startup Brilliant. He has two brothers, David F. Levi, a former U.S. attorney and federal district judge and 14th dean of Duke Law School, and Michael Levi, a scientist in both particle physics and cosmology at the Lawrence Berkeley National Laboratory. His cousin Daniel Meltzer served as Principal Deputy White House Counsel in the Obama administration.

Political offices
Preceded by Frank Strickland	Chairperson of the Legal Services Corporation; 2010–present	Incumbent
