= International Criminal Court Student Network =

The International Criminal Court Student Network (ICCSN) is an international student association that brings together young people interested in the International Criminal Court and in international criminal justice. The association aims at enhancing awareness about the Court’s activity and at increasing knowledge of issues of international criminal law. The ICCSN is currently a member of the Coalition for the International Criminal Court.

== History ==
The ICCSN was created in 2006 by students at the London School of Economics, UK and now includes members from six universities in London and the University of Cambridge, the University of Warwick, the University of Utrecht in The Netherlands, and, as of 2011, the University of Oxford. Law students at Duke University established the first U.S. Chapter. Students at Central Michigan University set up the first chapter at a university without a law school. The first chapter in Canada was opened at McGill University in the Autumn of 2012. In 2014, the first Australian chapter was founded by law students at the University of Western Sydney.

== Activities ==
Apart from campaigning, the network has hosted numerous speaker events, sent members on a trip to the Hague to visit and learn about the mechanisms of the ICC, and organised the first ever international criminal law meeting in the United Kingdom. The association was also represented as a member of the coalition for the ICC at the Seventh Session of the Assembly of State Parties in November 2008.

The association operates through the work of an Executive Committee, which includes a Director, a Chair, a Secretary, a Treasurer, a Public Relations Officer and an Outreach Officer, directly elected from the members of the association.
