= Alaska Bar Association =

Bar Association

- Formation: 1955
- Type: Non-Profit Mandatory Bar Association
- Headquarters: Anchorage, Alaska
- Location: United States
- Members: 4,000+
- President: Rebecca Patterson
- Website: alaskabar.org

The Alaska Bar Association (ABA) is a mandatory bar association responsible for the Alaska Supreme Court and for the admission and discipline process of attorneys for the state of Alaska.

== Governance ==
The association is governed by a Board of Governors with nine attorneys elected by Bar members and three public members appointed by the governor of Alaska. The Bar offers Continuing Legal Education and other member and public services. Membership numbers more than 4,000. The association is also responsible for administering the bar examination for the State. The Bar offers several membership categories, including active in-state, active out-of-state, inactive, senior and retired.

== History ==
The Association was founded in November 1896 in Juneau. Admission was dependent on a vote by the board of directors and payment of a fee of $1.

The association did not address matters involving attorney misconduct. The most severe punishment was expulsion from the club. The only action that would invoke suspension or expulsion was non-adherence to the minimum fee schedule. Potential cases of lawyer misconduct were referred to the U.S. Attorney's office for investigation, then to the grand jury for indictment and finally to the territorial court for adjudication.

United States v. Stringer instituted the Association. The case demonstrated how little power lawyers had in the territorial legal system and that cases and professional conduct were judged by the same jurist. This was a source of concern over judicial bias and overreach.

In 1955, the territorial legislature introduced The Alaska Integrated Bar Act of 1955, creating the Alaska Bar Association, a territory-wide organization that would govern the profession.

The first bar president, M.E. Monagle, was elected in 1955.

In October 1972, the Board of Governors established the Alaska Bar Foundation as a 501(c)(3) corporation. The Foundation strives to foster and maintain the honor and integrity of the legal profession. It is governed by seven trustees. It administers the Interest on Lawyers Trust Accounts (IOLTA) program, in accordance with rules established by the Alaskan Supreme Court. By joining IOLTA, attorneys’ unsegregated trust accounts generate interest income, which is sent to the Foundation to be used for grants to programs that provide civil legal services to low-income Alaskans.

== Structure ==
The Board of Governors consists of 12 members, nine attorneys and three citizens.

The nine attorneys are elected by their peers. Serving three-year staggered terms, two attorneys represent the First Judicial District, which includes Juneau and southeast Alaska; four are from the Third Judicial District, which includes Anchorage, the Matanuska-Susitna Valley, and the Kenai Peninsula; two members serve the Second and Fourth Judicial Districts, which includes Fairbanks and northwest Alaska; and one member is elected at-large.

The three citizen members are appointed by the governor and are subject to legislative confirmation. They serve staggered three-year terms.

Vacancies are appointed by the board until the next election. The board meets 5-6 times a year at dates and places designated by the president. Special meetings may be called by the president or three board members.

Typically in May, the board elects a president, vice president, secretary, and treasurer. The association employs an executive director.

== Finance ==
The Association is a non-profit funded by license fees paid by the state's lawyers. It generates additional revenue through on-line and live Continuing Legal Education courses, referrals and investments.

== Services ==
=== Lawyers ===
The Association implements the rules for admitting attorneys to the practice of law through biannual bar exams and annual re-licensing. The Bar Counsel investigates and prosecutes claims of attorney misconduct, as specified in the Alaska Bar Rules and Alaska Rules of Professional Responsibility. Disciplinary orders are ultimately imposed by the Alaska Supreme Court. Member services include:

- Continuing Legal Education on legal topics and ethical matters. Alaska lawyers are required to complete at least three hours of ethics training per year and are encouraged to obtain at least nine hours of other CLE.
- Bar Counsel provides informal advice to lawyers with questions about ethics. Ethics Opinions are available online.
- Telephonic Lawyer Referral Service. All lawyers are active Bar members in good standing.
- Lawyers' Assistance Committee that promotes the legal profession and protects the public by providing education, respectful confidential assistance and referrals for members of the Bar, their families, colleagues, and clients affected by a member's mental health and substance abuse issues.
- The SOLACE Program assists anyone within the Alaska legal community (lawyers, law office personnel, judges or courthouse employees) who suffers a catastrophic loss due to an unexpected event, illness or injury, through voluntary contributions and networking.
- 31 voluntary associations (Sections) of attorneys who are interested in a single topic, such as Alaska Native Law and Arctic Law. The Sections have regular meetings and often host their own CLE presentations.
- The Alaska Bar Rag is a quarterly print and on-line newsletter. It offers irreverent and topical content representing the Alaskan legal community.
- The Alaska Bar Convention is an annual 2.5-day event hosted in Anchorage, Juneau and Fairbanks. The convention features CLE courses, luncheons with award ceremonies, a banquet, and the inauguration of the new Bar president.

=== Public ===
The Alaska Bar Association provides services to the public, including:

- Forms and instructions for filing complaints against lawyers
- An online database for searching for public discipline records
- A guided procedure and process for resolving attorney/client fee disputes
- A Lawyers' Fund for Client Protection to reimburse clients who have been financially harmed by their attorney's professional misconduct.
- Guides and information on topics such as Seniors & the Law; the Alaska Youth Law Guide; Pro Bono Legal Service Providers; Unbundled Legal Services; Domestic Violence Protective Orders; Client's Rights and Responsibilities
- Alaska Free Legal Answers, an online service for low-income Alaskans; self-Help services; and a guide to legal resource websites.
- A free telephonic Lawyer Referral Service organized by topic, such as real estate, adoption, etc. Members of the public can receive contact information for lawyers practicing in specific areas. Lawyers who enroll in the Lawyer Referral Service agree to charge no more than $125 for the first half-hour of consultation.
- An annual free clinic on Martin Luther King Jr. Day enrolls volunteer lawyers from across the state to provide legal advice on issues including landlord/tenant disputes, family law matters, wills and estates, and public benefits issues.

== Nora Guinn Award ==
The Alaska Bar Association gives the Judge Nora Guinn Award, named after Alaska's first female and Alaska Native judge, to those who "made an extraordinary or sustained effort to assist Alaska’s Bush residents, especially its Native population, overcome language and cultural barriers to obtaining justice through the legal system". Honorees include David Avraham Voluck.

== See also ==
- Legal education in Alaska
