= Paul Carrington (professor) =

American lawyer and academic (1931–2021)

- Born: Paul DeWitt Carrington; June 12, 1931; Dallas, Texas
- Died: August 24, 2021 (aged 90); Mitchellville, Maryland
- Spouse: Bessie Meek (m. 1955–2016)
- Children: Clark Carrington; Mary Carrington; William Carrington; Emily Carrington

Academic background
- Education: University of Texas; Harvard Law School

Academic work
- Discipline: Law
- Sub-discipline: Civil procedure
- Institutions: Duke University School of Law

Paul DeWitt Carrington (June 12, 1931 – August 24, 2021) was an American lawyer and academic who served as dean of Duke University School of Law from 1978 to 1988, where he was also the Harry R. Chadwick Sr. Professor of Law. Before joining the faculty of Duke in 1978, Carrington served on the faculty of the University of Wyoming, Indiana University, Ohio State University, and the University of Michigan. From 1985 to 1992, he also served as Reporter for the Advisory Committee on Civil Rules of the Judicial Conference of the United States. He was elected to the American Law Institute in 1966 and to the American Academy of Arts & Sciences in 2000.
