= Duke University School of Law =

Private law school in Durham, North Carolina, US

Coordinates: 36.0013°N 78.9447°W

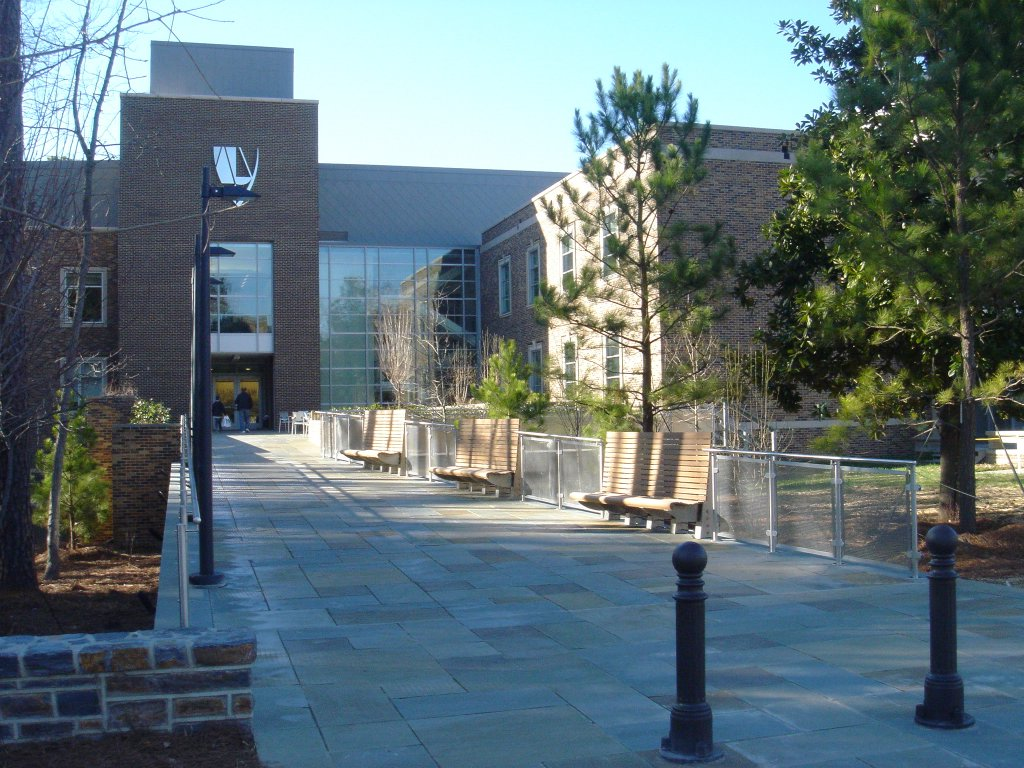
- Parent school: Duke University
- Established: 1868; 158 years ago
- School type: Private law school
- Parent endowment: $8.5 billion
- Dean: Kerry Abrams
- Location: Durham, North Carolina, U.S.
- USNWR ranking: 7th (tie) (2026)
- Bar pass rate: 98% (2019)
- Website: law.duke.edu
- ABA profile: Standard 509 Report

The Duke University School of Law is the law school of Duke University, a private university in Durham, North Carolina.

The school is a constituent academic unit that began in 1868 as the Trinity College School of Law. In 1924, following the renaming of Trinity College to Duke University, the school was renamed Duke University School of Law.

== History ==
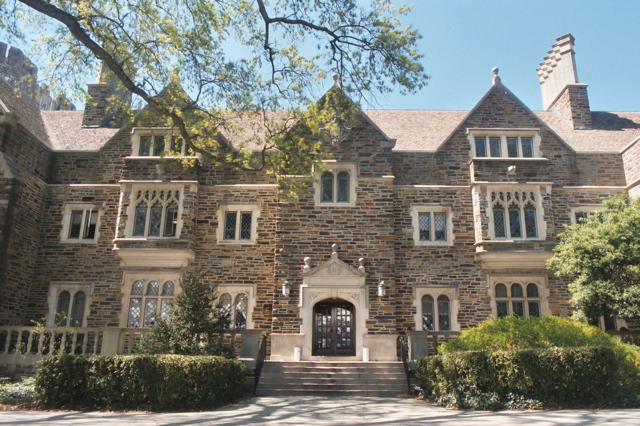
Built in 1929, the Languages Building (as it is currently known) was the home of Duke Law from 1930 to 1962

The date of founding is generally considered to be 1868 or 1924.

However, in 1855 Trinity College, the precursor to Duke University, began offering lectures on, but not degrees in, Constitutional and International Law. During this time, Trinity was located in Randolph County, North Carolina.

In 1865, Trinity's Law Department was officially founded, while 1868 marked the official chartering of the School of Law. After a ten-year hiatus from 1894 to 1904, James B. Duke and Benjamin Newton Duke provided the endowment to reopen the school, with Samuel Fox Mordecai as its senior professor (by this time, Trinity College had relocated to Durham, North Carolina). When Trinity College became part of the newly created Duke University upon the establishment of the Duke Endowment in 1924, the School of Law continued as the Duke University School of Law. In 1930, the law school moved from the Carr Building on Duke's East Campus to a new location on the main quad of West Campus. During the three years preceding this move, the size of the law library tripled. Among other well-known alumni, Richard Nixon, the 37th president of the United States, graduated from the school in 1937. In 1963, the school moved to its present location on Science Drive in West Campus.

Law students at Duke University established the first U.S. Chapter of the International Criminal Court Student Network (ICCSN) in 2009.

== Admissions ==
For the class entering in the fall of 2023, 244 students enrolled out of 6,205 applicants. The 25th and 75th LSAT percentiles for the 2023 entering class were 168 and 172, respectively, with a median of 170 (top three percent of test takers worldwide). The 25th and 75th undergraduate GPA percentiles were 3.78 and 3.96, respectively, with a median of 3.87. The school has approximately 750 JD students and 100 students in the LLM and SJD programs.

== Rankings ==
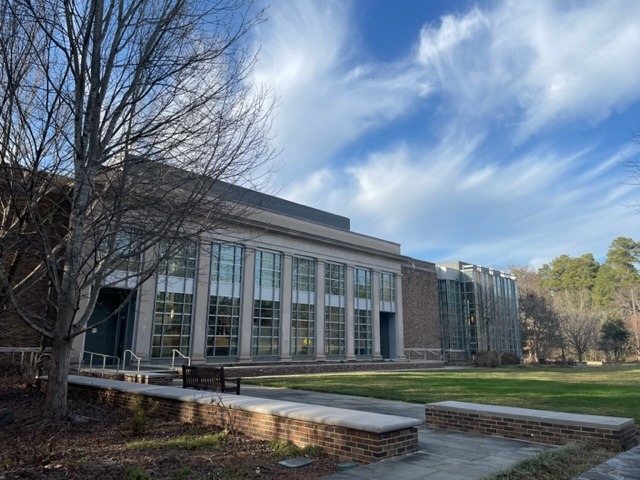
Duke University School of Law (February 2023)

Duke Law School is ranked seventh, tied with New York University School of Law, in the 2026 U.S. News' Best Law Schools ranking. It is currently ranked number one in the Above the Law Rankings. The Law School is consistently ranked within the top 14 law schools in the country, and is a member of the T14 law schools; it has never been ranked lower than 12th by U.S. News, or lower than 7th by Above the Law. Duke Law is one of three T14 law schools to have graduated a president of the United States (Richard Nixon). Duke Law was ranked by Forbes as having graduated lawyers with the 2nd highest median mid-career salary amount. In 2017, The Times Higher Education World University Rankings listed Duke Law as the number one ranked law school in the world.

Other rankings include:

- 1st Best Law School according to Above the Law (2025, 2023, 2022, and 2020; 3rd in 2021 and 2024)
- 1st Best Professors according to the Princeton Review (2015 and 2016; 2nd in 2018–2020, 2023, 2025)
- 1st Best Quality of Life according to the Princeton Review (2014, 2nd in 2015 and 2017, 7th in 2023)
- 1st Best Career Prospects according to Princeton Review (2020; 5th in 2023)
- 2nd Best Classroom Experience according to Princeton Review (2015, 2017, 2023; 3rd in 2018 and 2019; 4th in 2020 and 2025)
- 3rd Best Law School (overall) according to the Best Law Schools ranking published by the National Jurist in 2013.
- 5th Best Law School by Vault (2017)
- 7th Best in the world in the subject of law according to the Academic Ranking of World Universities in 2022

== Facilities ==
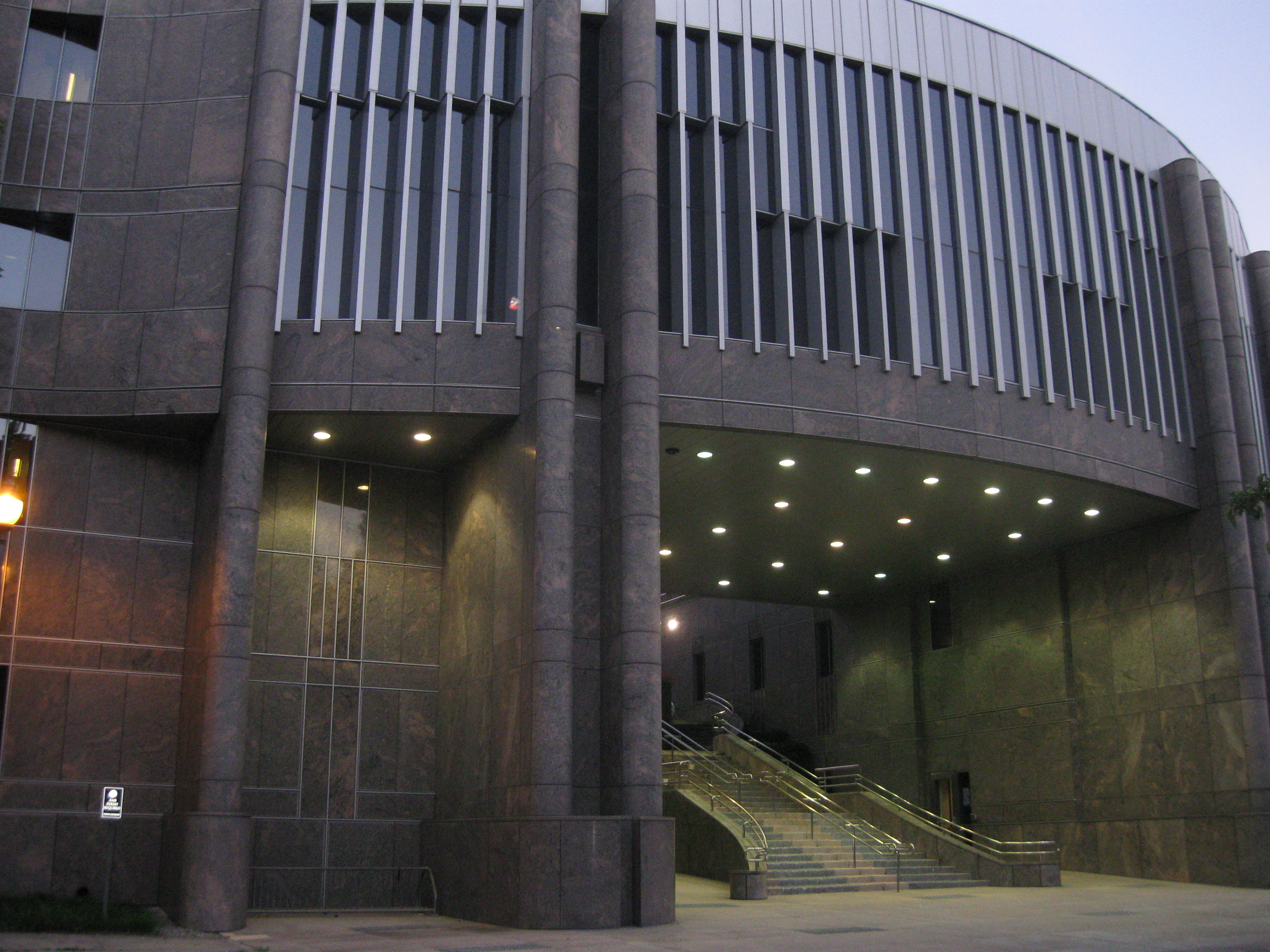
The rear entrance to the Law School's present location, on Science Drive

The Trinity College School of Law was located in the Carr Building prior to the renaming of Trinity to Duke University in 1924. The Duke University Law School was originally housed in what is now the Languages Building, built in 1929 on Duke's West Campus quad.

The law school is presently located at the corner of Science Drive and Towerview Road and was constructed in the mid-1960s.

The first addition to the law school was completed in 1994, and a dark polished granite façade was added to the rear exterior of the building, enclosing the interior courtyard.

In 2004, Duke Law School broke ground on a building construction project officially completed in fall 2008. The renovation and addition offers larger and more technologically advanced classrooms, expanded community areas and eating facilities, known as the Star Commons, improved library facilities, and more study options for students.

== Center for the Study of the Public Domain ==
Center for the Study of the Public Domain is a university center, aiming to redress the balance of academic study of intellectual property. In their analysis, academic focus has been too great on the incentives created by these rights, rather than the contribution to creativity from information which is not subject to them and also opposing the fair use, as they're focusing on Copyright Act of 1909 rather than Copyright Act of 1976

== Law journals ==
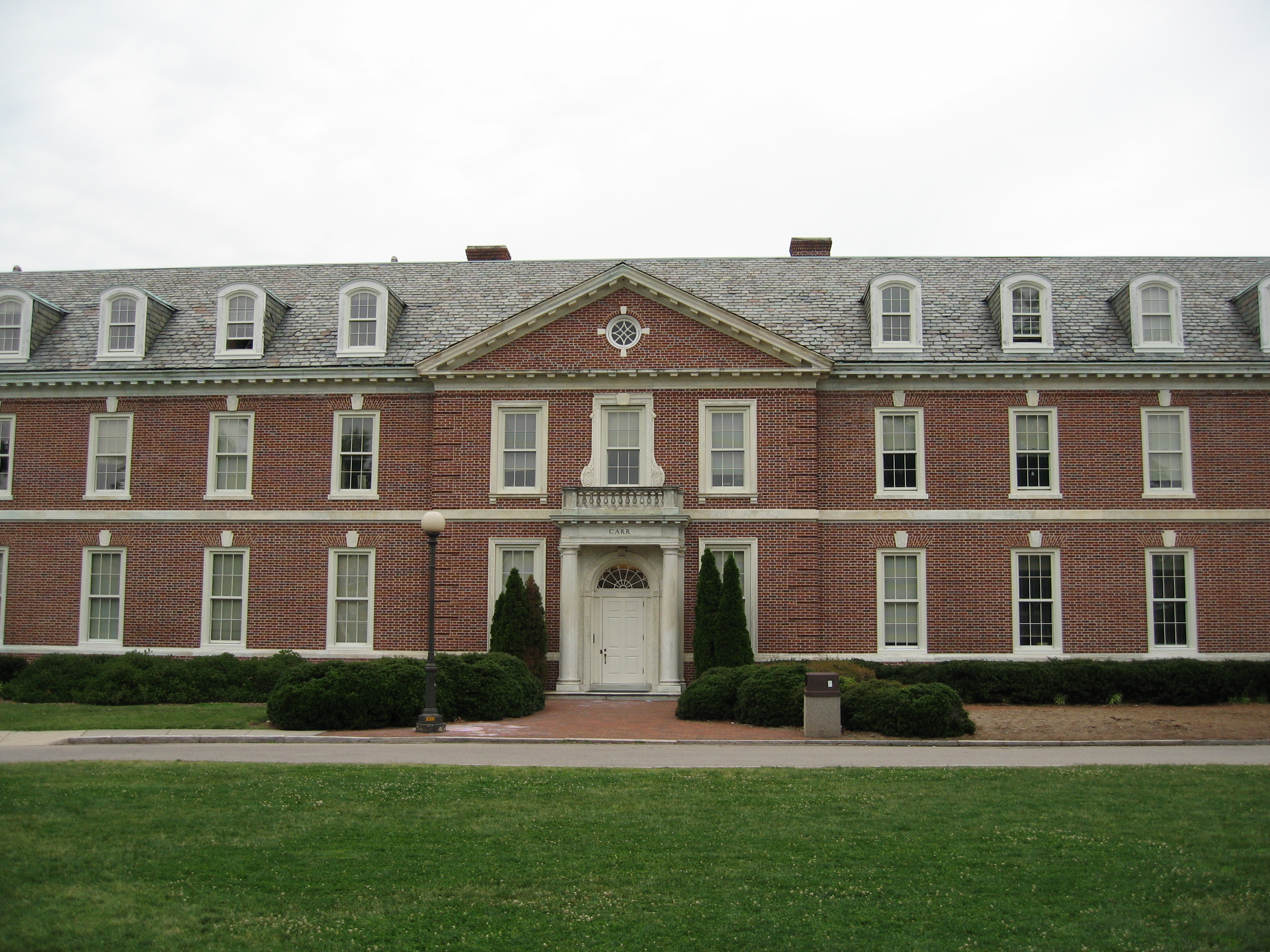
The Trinity College School of Law was located in the Carr Building prior to the renaming of Trinity to Duke University in 1924

Duke Law School publishes eight academic journals or law reviews, which are, in order of their founding:

- Law and Contemporary Problems
- Duke Law Journal
- Alaska Law Review
- Duke Journal of Comparative & International Law
- Duke Environmental Law & Policy Forum
- Duke Journal of Gender Law & Policy (discontinued)
- Duke Law & Technology Review
- Duke Journal of Constitutional Law & Public Policy

Law and Contemporary Problems is a quarterly, interdisciplinary, faculty-edited publication of the law school. Unlike traditional law reviews, L&CP uses a symposium format, generally publishing one symposium per issue on a topic of contemporary concern. L&CP hosts an annual conference at the law school featuring the authors of one of the year’s four symposia. Established in 1933, it is the oldest journal published at the law school.

The Duke Law Journal was the first student-edited publication at Duke Law and publishes articles from leading scholars on topics of general legal interest.

Duke publishes the Alaska Law Review in a special agreement with the Alaska Bar Association, as the state of Alaska has no law school. The members of this journal regularly travel to Alaska to meet with local judges, policymakers, and experts. Historically, student editors have traveled to Anchorage to meet Alaska Supreme Court justices and native justice leaders during fall break, and the state capital Juneau to engage with state legislators and community members during spring break.

The Duke Journal of Gender Law & Policy (DJGLP) is the preeminent journal for its subject matter in the world. As of Volume 27 during the 2019-2020 academic year, DJGLP has been discontinued and no longer publishes new issues or articles.

The Duke Law & Technology Review has been published since 2001 and is devoted to examining the evolving intersection of law and technology. Along with the Duke Environmental Law & Policy Forum, it is one of Duke Law's two non-exclusive journals, meaning that students can choose to join either of both of the non-exclusive journals alongside any of the other exclusive journals.

The Duke Journal of Constitutional Law & Public Policy was founded by members of the Class of 2006. Professors Erwin Chemerinsky and Christopher H. Schroeder served as the ConLaw journal's inaugural faculty advisors. Mikkelsen was the first editor-in-chief; the current editor-in-chief is Andrew Touma. The journal intends to fill a gap in law journal scholarship with a publication that could "cover constitutional developments and litigation, and their intersection with public policy". To ensure that the journal would remain timely, it established a partnership with the Duke Program in Public Law to produce "Supreme Court Commentaries" summarizing and explaining the impact recent cases could have on current issues. The journal publishes continually online and annually in print. It has sponsored speaker series and conferences that explore various issues in constitutional law and public policy.

The law school provides free online access to all of its academic journals, including the complete text of each journal issue dating back to January 1996 in a fully searchable HTML format and in Adobe Acrobat format (PDF). New issues are posted on the web simultaneously with print publication.

In 2005, the law school was featured in the June 6 unveiling of the Open Access Law Program, an initiative of Creative Commons, for its work in pioneering open access to legal scholarship.

== Joint-degree programs ==
The school offers joint-degree programs with the Duke University Graduate School, the Duke Divinity School, Fuqua School of Business, the Medical School, the Nicholas School of the Environment and Earth Sciences, the Pratt School of Engineering, and the Sanford School of Public Policy; and a JD/LLM dual degree program in International and Comparative Law. Approximately 25 percent of students are enrolled in joint-degree programs.

== Employment ==
According to Duke's 2017 ABA-required disclosures, 93.8 percent of the class of 2017 obtained full-time, long-term, JD-required employment nine months after graduation and not funded by the school – the highest number for any law school in the country. According to the NLJ, Duke ranks third among all law schools in the percentage of 2017 graduates working in federal clerkships or jobs at firms of 100 or more lawyers, a category NLJ terms "elite jobs". Duke also ranks fourth in federal clerkships.

Law School Transparency gave Duke Law the highest "Employment Score" in the country at 93.8 percent and lowest "Under-Employment Score" of 0.4 percent in 2017.

== Notable faculty ==
Notable faculty include a sitting Supreme Court justice, a former United States senator, 14 former Supreme Court clerks, a former federal judge and a former judge advocate general.

- Samuel Alito, Associate Justice of the Supreme Court of the United States (visiting professor)
- James Boyle, William Neal Reynolds Professor of Law (Intellectual Property and Legal Theory)
- James Earl Coleman, John S. Bradway Professor of Law (criminal law) and director of the Center for Criminal Justice and Professional Responsibility
- Chelsea Cook, member of the Durham City Council
- James C. Dever III, United States district judge of the United States District Court for the Eastern District of North Carolina
- Charles J. Dunlap Jr., professor of the practice of law, executive director, Duke Center on Law, Ethics and National Security, major general of the United States Air Force
- Thavolia Glymph, John Hope Franklin Visiting Professor of American Legal History
- Jack Knight, Frederic Cleaveland Professor of Law and Political Science
- David F. Levi, Dean, former chief judge of the United States District Court for the Eastern District of California (1994–2007), former law clerk to Supreme Court Justice Lewis Powell
- H. Jefferson Powell, professor of law, former principal deputy solicitor general of the United States
- Arti K. Rai, Elvin R. Latty Professor of Law, former Administrator of the Office of External Affairs at the U.S. Patent and Trademark Office (2009–2010)
- Sarah Bloom Raskin, Rubenstein Fellow, former United States Deputy Secretary of the Treasury (2014–2017), former governor of the Federal Reserve (2010–2014)
- Christopher H. Schroeder, Charles S. Murphy Professor of Law (administrative law), assistant attorney general for the Office of Legal Policy (OLP), former acting assistant attorney general for the Office of Legal Policy, Chief Counsel to the U.S. Senate Judiciary Committee
- Scott Silliman, professor of the practice of law (national security law, military law, and the law of armed conflict)
- Michael Tigar, professor of the practice of law (criminal law), former law clerk to Supreme Court Justice William Brennan,
- Jonathan B. Wiener, William R. and Thomas L. Perkins Professor of Law (Risk Analysis and Regulation)
- Jedediah Purdy, Raphael Lemkin Distinguished Professor of Law.

=== Former faculty ===
- William Van Alstyne, former William R. & Thomas S. Perkins Chair of Law (Constitutional Law), 1974–2004 (deceased)
- Erwin Chemerinsky, former Alston & Bird Professor of Law (Constitutional Law), current dean of the UC Berkeley School of Law
- Brainerd Currie, conflict of laws pioneer (deceased)
- Richard A. Danner, Archibald C. and Frances Fulk Rufty Research Professor of Law (former law librarian at University of Wisconsin–Madison) (deceased)
- Walter E. Dellinger III, Douglas Blount Maggs Professor of Law, former acting solicitor general of the United States (1996–1997), former law clerk to Supreme Court Justice Hugo Black (deceased)
- Robinson O. Everett, professor of criminal law and former chief judge of the United States Court of Military Appeals (deceased) (also professor at Wake Forest University)
- Joseph Tyree Sneed III, former dean (1971–1973); federal judge (1973–1987) (deceased)

=== Deans of Duke Law School ===
- 1850–1882, Braxton Craven
- 1891–1894, A.C. Avery
- 1904–1927, Samuel Fox Mordecai
- 1927–1930, W. Bryan Bolich (acting)
- 1930–1934, Justin Miller
- 1934–1947, H. Claude Horack
- 1947–1949, Harold Sheperd
- 1949–1950, Charles L.B. Lowndes
- 1950–1956, Joseph A. McClain Jr.
- 1956–1957, Dale F. Stansbury (acting)
- 1957–1966, Elvin Latty
- 1966–1968, F. Hodge O'Neal
- 1968–1970, A. Kenneth Pye
- 1971–1973, Joseph Tyree Sneed III
- 1973–1976, A. Kenneth Pye
- 1976–1977, Walter Dellinger (acting)
- 1978–1988, Paul Carrington
- 1988–1999, Pamela Gann
- 1999, Clark C. Havighurst (interim)
- 2000–2007, Katharine T. Barlett
- 2007–2018, David F. Levi
- 2018 – present, Kerry Abrams
